= Sarbhana =

Coordinates: 34.0000°N 73.0000°E

- Union council
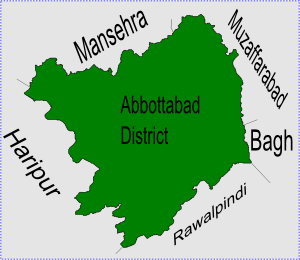
- Sarbhana is located in Abbottabad District
- Interactive map of Sarbhana
- Country: Pakistan
- Province: Khyber-Pakhtunkhwa
- District: Abbottabad
- Tehsil: Abbottabad

Government
  - Nazim: Haji Javed Khan
  - Naib Nazim: Gulzeb Khan

Sarbhana is one of the 51 union councils of Abbottabad District in Khyber-Pakhtunkhwa province of Pakistan.

== Location ==
Sarbhana is located in the west of the district, it is bounded by the following Union Councils, to the north by Kakul, Kuthwal and Beerangali, to the east by Phalkot, to the south by Namli Maira, Bagnotar and Bagh, and to the west by Dhamtour (Sungli Narrian village).

== Subdivisions ==
The Union Council is subdivided into the following areas: Aziz Bang, Dessal, Khan, Sadra, Dharia, Sarbhana, Seergah, Mohar Khurd and Narian, Sungli.
