= Pattan Kalan =

Town in Pakistan

Coordinates: 34.0000°N 73.0000°E

- Union council
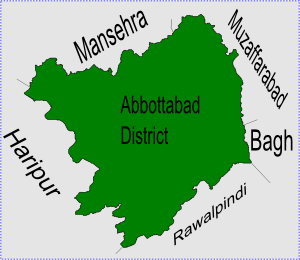
- Pattan Kalan is located in the Abbottabad District
- Interactive map of Pattan Kalan
- Country: Pakistan
- Province: Khyber-Pakhtunkhwa
- District: Abbottabad
- Tehsil: Abbottabad

Population (2017 Census of Pakistan)
  - Total: 14,584

Pattan Kalan is a residential town and one of the 51 union councils of the Abbottabad District, in the Khyber-Pakhtunkhwa province of Pakistan. It lies within an area that was affected by the 2005 earthquake, after which a total of 27 small camps were set up in the area.

== Location ==
Patan Kalan is located at 34°15'11N 73°26'28E on the eastern side of the Abbottabad District, where it forms part of the Khyber-Pakhtunkhwa's border with the Muzaffarabad District of Kashmir. It also borders the following union councils within the Abbottabad District:

- North: Kukmang and Boi
- West: Thandiani & Kuthwal
- South: Beerangali and Nambal

The village is located approximately 40 km from Abbottabad on the Abbottabad-Muzaffarabad road, approximately 7,000 feet above sea level.

== Geography ==
Patan kalan is a mountainous area located in the Abbottabad District, and is the largest village in the Galyat/ Bakote region. Much of the hilly countryside is covered in trees, including evergreens like pine, walnut, oak, and maple.

The highest peak of the Abbottabad District the popular tourist destination Thandiani, is located near Pattan Kalan, at 34°13'60N 73°22'0E.

The local wildlife includes leopards, monkeys, pheasants, flying squirrels, and pine marten (although the latter two are rare).

== Population ==
The majority of the people of are Muslims. Most people in the village belong to one of three tribes: Qureshi ( Damaal), Gujjar, and Abbasi. The predominant dialect of the region is Hindko.

== Economy ==
Farming is the main occupation of the people in this region. The farming is still done in the traditional manner (using oxen) in the more remote locations and by machinery in the villages. The major rabi crops grown in Pattan Kalan are potatoes and maize. The only Kharif crop grown in the area is wheat, to which a very small area of the village is dedicated. There are two main purposes of this crop: to feed cattle and for the grain. Other vegetables grown in Pattan Kalan include turnips, radishes, peas, pumpkins, beans, and mustard. Fruits like pears, apples, black grapes, grapes, figs, peaches, damson plums, mulberries, wild figs, lemons, apricots, and cherries are grown in Pattan Kalan.

Wood is the primary source of fuel and home construction. Gas cylinders are also used as fuel but only in very small quantities.

== Climate ==
Winters in Pattan Kalan are extreme and last from October to April. During the summer months the temperature rises to a maximum of 25–30 degrees, with the hottest months being May and June. The monsoon season lasts from mid-July to mid-August.
