= Dahamtore Union Council =

Dhamtore دھمتوڑ
- Union council
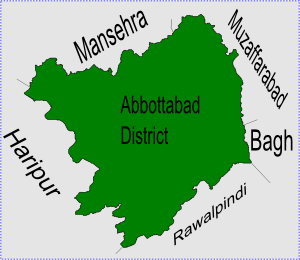
- Location of Dahamtore union council (highlighted in green) within Abbottabad district

- Location within Pakistan
- Coordinates: 34°08′0″N 73°16′0″E
- Country: Pakistan
- Province: Khyber-Pakhtunkhwa
- District: Abbottabad
- District: Abbottabad

Government
  - Nazim: Aurangzeb Khan
  - Naib Nazim: Ch Sajid Mehmood

Population (2017)
  - Total: 15,427

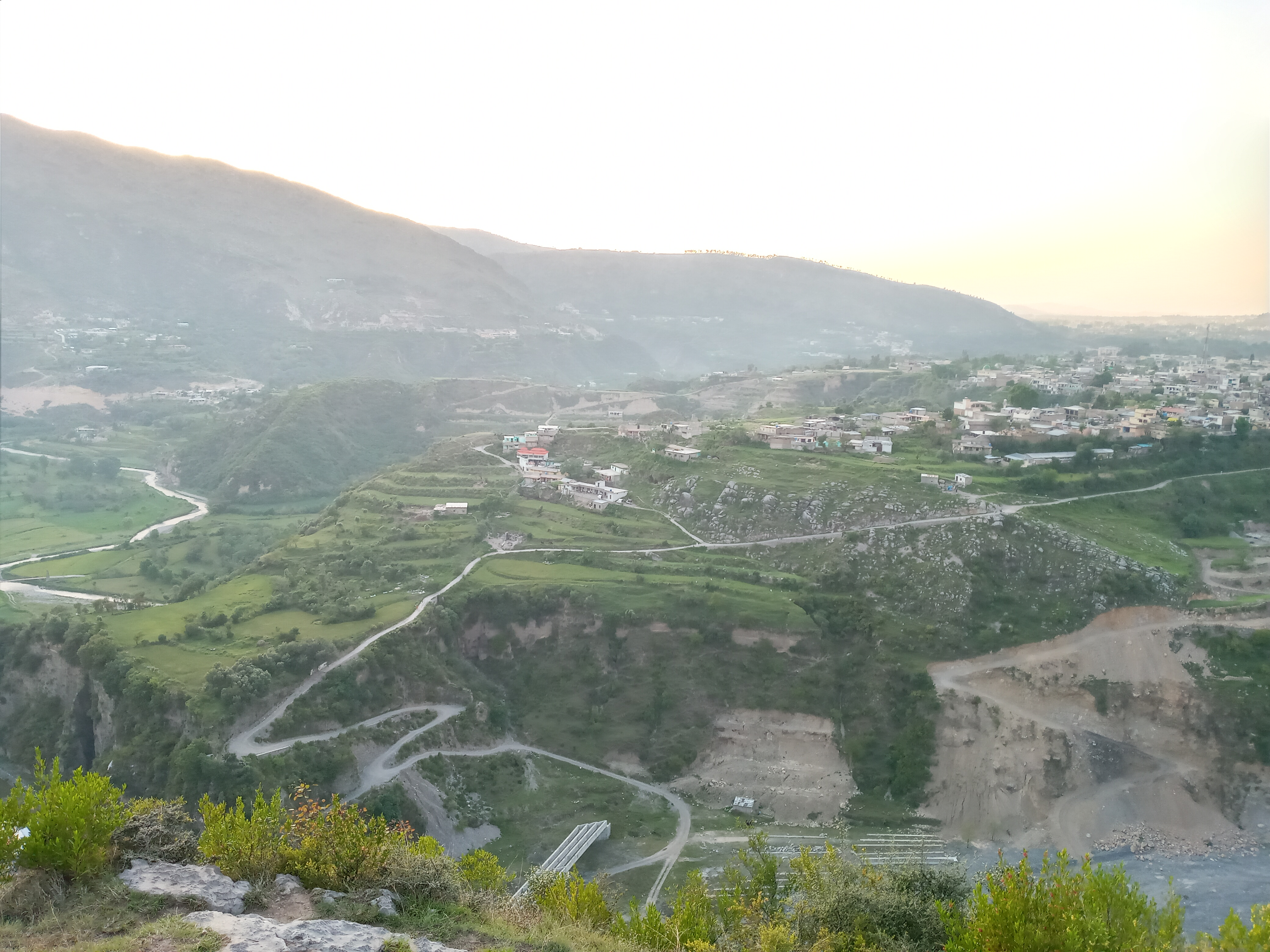
Dhamtore

Dhamtore (Hindko, Urdu: دھمتوڑ) is a union council of Abbottabad District in the Khyber Pakhtunkhwa province of Pakistan. The village of Dhamtour is the main settlement in the Union Council.

The main language of the area is Hindko which is the traditional mother tongue of Hazara Division and although the majority people of this area belong from Jadoon Pashtoon tribe some villages have Gojri as their mother tongue. The Union Council is the gateway to places such as Murree, Nathia Gali, Dunga Gali, Bara Gali, Ayubia National Park, Miranjani, Mushkpuri and the most famous picnic spot of Abbottabad, Harnoi.

== Subdivisions ==
The Union Council of Dhamtour is divided into the areas of Banda Bazdar, Bandi Shoalian, Dhamtour, Guldhok, Jaswal, Nagakki, Banda Said and Ukhreela.

== Location ==
Dhamtour has an average elevation of 1110 metres (3645). It is situated to the west of Abbottabad city and borders Sheikh-ul-Bandi to the north and Nagri Bala to the south.

== History ==
Dhamtour is an ancient city and there were markets here before British rule. Dhamtore was the main market and business center for the surrounding areas.

During the Second Sikh War, James Abbott marched his men through Dahamtore en route to the Dor Valley in a failed attempt to prevent Chatar Singh from heading northwards from Haripur to Mansehra.

In his journal on 28 May 1848 Abbott notes that the "disputes concerning landed property in Dumtour are so virulent that I am obliged to send an especial Commissioner to settle them I would adjourn thither myself but for its distance from the dak line, a matter just now of some consequence.
