= Abbottabad Central =

Coordinates: 34.1500°N 73.2167°E

- Union Council
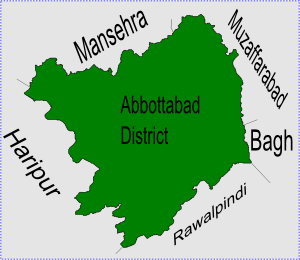
- Abbottabad Central
- Interactive map of Abbottabad Central
- Country: Pakistan
- Province: Khyber Pakhtunkhwa
- District: Abbottabad
- Tehsil: Abbottabad

Population
  - Total: 107,654
- Website: www.amazonesouq.com

Abbottabad Central (سنترال) is one of the 51 union councils of Abbottabad District in the Khyber Pakhtunkhwa province of Pakistan. Located in Abbottabad city, the capital of the district, it borders the following union councils: Malikpura Urban to the north and west, by Salhad to the south and by Dhamtour to the east.

This area comprises the main Old Town of Abbottabad, established originally during British colonial rule, in 1853, and its immediate suburbs.

Some of the main interesting places falling within this area include:

- The Old British Cantonment, along with the Frontier Force Regiment center, the Baloch Regiment center, the Army Medical Corps (Pakistan) headquarters and other military installations.
- The famous old St. Luke's Church, Abbottabad (established 1864) and the historic Old Christian Cemetery, Abbottabad.
- The Panj Peer Shrine, or 'Shrine of the Five Saints', associated with Sufis of the Chishti Order
- The Ladies' Garden Park
- The old Saddar/Cantonment Bazaar
