= Dagri Naka =

Dagri Naka is a mountainous area in Galiyat region Khyber Pakhtunkhwa, Pakistan located between the trek of Thandiani and Nathiagali at 2720 meters or 8924 feet above sea level. Dagri (also called Dugri) means "The home of leopards" in the local language.

== Trekking ==
There are two treks to approach Dugri from the hill station Nathiagali. A long trek leads to Dugri rest house via Namlimera near Miranjani. A comparatively short trek towards Miranjani hilltop passes Dugri through the pine forest. It takes 9 to 10 hours trek from Nathiagali to Dugri. From Dugri, there is a 10 km trail that leads to Meranjani. From Dugri, another 13 km trail leads to Beerangali and from there it is a 10 km trek to Thandiani.

== Environment ==
The region is covered with pine trees, and has one of the most dense pine forests in the Galiyat region. Dugri is surrounded by subtropical evergreen forest.

== 2005 earthquake ==
Dugri was badly affected by the 2005 Kashmir earthquake. The Dugri rest house's main building was damaged due to it. A wooden hut, which is also a part of the dugri rest house, was not damaged during the earthquake, and is still in use.
