= Nawansher Urban =

Coordinates: 34.0000°N 73.0000°E

Nawansher
- Union council
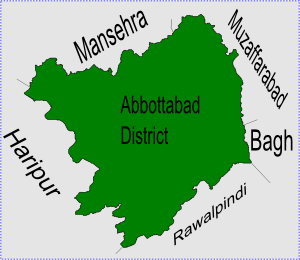
- Nawansher Urban
- Interactive map of Nawansher
- Country: Pakistan
- Province: Khyber-Pakhtunkhwa
- District: Abbottabad
- Tehsil: Abbottabad

Government
  - Nazim: Wajhat khan, Asif Khan
  - Naib Nazim: Abbas Ali, Khalid khan

Population
  - Total: Above 1 lac

Nawansher Urban is one of the 51 union councils of Abbottabad District in Khyber-Pakhtunkhwa province of Pakistan. It contains two neighbourhood councils and is located in the north of the district. It is one of the oldest settlements in Abbottabad district.

== Sibdivisions ==
It is further subdivided into some mohallahs. Some of them are as listed below. Mohallah Mohammad Zai, Nia Mohallah, Mohallah Shoaib Zai, Mohallah Imran Zai, Mohallah Khalil Zai, Mohallah Moosa Zai, Mohallah Qilla. Mohallah Dhodehal, Orush colony, Ehtesham colony jogan, Ilyasi

== Tribal ==
Jadoon is biggest tribe in area although sardars awans and other small tribe also live there.
