= Chamhatti =

- Village
- Interactive map of Chamhatti
- Coordinates: 34.226°N 73.035°E
- Country: Pakistan
- Province: Khyber Pakhtunkhwa
- District: Abbottabad
- Tehsil: Lower Tanawal
- Founder: Khan Tanoli

Chamhatti (Urdu, چمہٹی) is a village located in Sherwan which is a Union Council of Lower Tanawal Tehsil in the Abbottabad District of Khyber Pakhtunkhwa province of Pakistan. It is located at 34°13'34N 73°2'6E and has an average elevation of 849 metres (2788 feet). and lies in the North West of Abbottabad District where it forms part of the border with Mansehra District. Chamhatti is located at a distance of about 25 Kilometres from Mansehra City and a distance of about 50 Kilometres from Abbottabad. It was an independent union council until 2002 but later on it was merged with Union Council Sherwan.

== Demography ==
The Tanoli are the main tribe of Chamhatti village and surrounding areas, other tribes include the Awan, Syed and Gujjer.

== Neighbouring villages ==
The following are neighbouring villages of Chamhatti:

- Ahmad Abad
- Beri
- Chakar Bayaan Kalan
- Chakar Bayaan Khurd
- Dera Sharif
- Juhna
- Kameela
- Kangar Bala
- Kangar Pain
- Khalabat
- Kharpir
- Nakka
- Namshehra
- Nechaan
- Thathi Ahmad Khan

== Education ==
Chamhatti and its every neighbouring village have at least one primary school. There are three middle schools for girls in Chamhatti, Thathi Ahmad Khan and in Kangar Bala. And two middle schools for boys in Thathi Ahmad Khan and in Kangar Pain. There is also a high school for boys in Chamhatti village. Some famous teachers of Government High School Chamhatti are:

Aslam Khan, Munawwar Sultan, Dilbahadur, Nisar Sulemani, Muhammad Tariq, Maqbool ur Rehman, Jehanzeb Khan, Qari Sultan, Abdul Mustafa, Zulfiqar Ali, Abdul Majeed, and Imtiaz Ahmad etc.
