= Nawan Shehr =

Pakistani town

- Town
- Location within Khyber Pakhtunkhwa Location within Pakistan
- Coordinates: 34°9′51″N 73°15′50″E
- Country: Pakistan
- Province: Khyber Pakhtunkhwa
- Division: Hazara
- District: Abbottabad
- Tehsil: Abbottabad
- Elevation: 1,216 m (3,990 ft)

Population (2023)
  - Total: 40,711

Nawan Shehr (Urdu: نواں شہر) is a town in Abbottabad District, Khyber Pakthunkhwa, Pakistan. The town is renowned for the historic Ilyasi Masjid, the largest and oldest mosque in the district of Abbottabad. Behind the mosque lies a small hill with walking trails, adding to the town's scenic charm. During the summer, Nawan Shehr attracts visitors from across the country due to its pleasant climate. It is also home to educational institutions of the Board of Intermediate and Secondary Education. Nawan Shehr has its own old bazaar which is famous for its Chapli Kebab. The primary language spoken is Hindko, with Gojri also spoken in some areas. Nawan Shehr is located on the route to Abbottabad City and the tourist destinations of Thandiani and Nathia Gali along Murree Road, at an elevation of 1,216 meters (3,990 feet).

== History ==
On the 3rd of June 1847 James Abbott, who would later become First Deputy Commissioner of Hazara, noted in his journal: "Marched to Nowa Shihr, 17 miles, a town of huts in a singularly beautiful and fertile valley, of considerable elevation. The wheat is still standing, although some of the ram crops are in ear. This would form a most desirable residence but for the fever with which it is visited during the rains and the swampiness of the soil at that season, I sought in vain for a quarter of an acre of ground near the town free from cultivation as a site for a shed to shelter me during the rains. I have ordered the erection of one, however, upon ground to be rented during occupation. The fever here seems to be less universal than in Pukli and Hurkishengurh". Abbott would later go onto found the town of Abbottabad as the capital of Hazara District

The town, referred to as Nawashahir, was mentioned by British geologist Charles Stewart Middlemiss when he was doing a survey of the area as part of his geological fieldwork in Hazara for the colonial era Geological Survey of India.

In January 2018 a state funeral was held for Retired Air Marshal Asghar Khan was held in Nawan Shehr, Khan had been the first native commander of the Pakistan Airforce succeeding sir Arthur McDonald in 1957. Khan given full military honours with Pakistan air force jets flying over.

== Ex Nazim Lambardar Muhammad Iqabal Khan jadoon ==
For the past 50 years, Muhammad Iqbal Khan has been actively dedicated to serving his town Nawanshehr as a social worker. Khan has raised his voice on numerous platforms for the rights of his city and its people. In the past, when an attempt was made to acquire land on both sides of Murree Road for the Abbottabad Township, Iqbal Khan, alongside the city's elders, stood in the way by demanding a "develop and return" condition; today, this very area has transformed into a massive residential population. Iqbal Khan also served the city for a long period in an active capacity as a councillor.

The previous provincial government intended to eliminate the current Nawan Shehr Stadium and convert it into a housing colony, but here too, Iqbal Khan, with the cooperation of the city's elders, foiled this conspiracy and preserved the stadium for healthy recreational activities. When the local governments dissolved, a foreign scheme, the K.F.W Germany Water and Sanitation Scheme, was approved. The elders of the city formed a reform committee and entrusted its presidency to Muhammad Iqbal Khan. In his capacity as president, he brought this scheme to completion and provided water to every single household in Nawan Shehr with a budget of approximately 60 to 70 million rupees (6-7 crore). Furthermore, as the Town Nazim, he secured a grant of 90 million (9 crore) from the federation and an additional miscellaneous grant of over 25 million (2.5 crore) to lay down a network of developmental projects in the city, which included the provision of Sui gas, electricity, and the repair of roads and streets. The commencement of arts classes at the Government Science College Nawan Shehr is entirely due to the efforts of Iqbal Khan. For the past seven years, Iqbal Khan has been fulfilling his duties as the Patron-in-Chief of the Sadabahar Arts Council. Even today, Iqbal Khan remains actively engaged in serving his city, refining the fields of knowledge and literature, and introducing national and regional culture at the country-wide level. For future Iqbal Khan has approved the following funds for betterment of Nawanshehr Construction of the funeral prayer site (Janazgah) and the boundary wall of the cemetery near Ghari Pannah Chowk, Nawanshehr.Construction and paving of the road, and from Ghari Pind to Upper Ghari Pannah, Nawanshehr.Paving of the street opposite Mian Wazir Sahib Ziarat, Ghari Pannah, Nawanshehr, and other areas which include Ouresh Colony, Kohsar Town, and Basti Lal Khan."

== Geology ==
Nawan Shehr, situated at an elevation of approximately 3,954 feet, lies near the southwestern edge of a geologically complex region extending from Mirpur through Kakol to Mandrochh Kalan. The area is notable for its intricate stratigraphy and tectonic features.

- The Infra-Trias formation near Nawashahir is spread out as a flat platform.
- It receives a gentle synclinal fold of Trias limestone above it, indicating a relatively stable depositional environment compared to the more contorted sections near Kakool.

A straight and steady fault near Nawan Shehr introduces the Nummulitic formation, a significant geological unit typically associated with Eocene-aged marine deposits. Nawan Shehr is part of a larger geological rim encircling an alluvial bay from Mirpur to Mandrochh Kalan. The terrain transitions from steep, faulted ridges near Kakool to more subdued, gently folded platforms near Nawan Shehr. The area's structural complexity includes isoclinal folds, synclines, and fault-induced juxtaposition of formations.

== Health ==
The town has one Basic Health Unit (BHU) that is easily accessibly to the public however due to public scepticism about health advice, the Ilyasi Mosque in Nawan Shehr (which has enough capacity to hold 35,000 people) was used by government as an educational setting for the public to learn about vaccinations.

== Tourist attractions ==
Nawanshehr features some of its own tourist attractions, such as:

- Ilyasi Masjid (mosque)
- Bungalows (Locally known as Havelis) of Babu Sher Das.

In Nawanshehr there is a famous mosque that was built over a stream of water that flows from the mountain. The mosque stills stands to this day and still has water flowing underneath it. It is called Ilyasi Masjid. In front of it is a little pond-like area in which people can ride paddle-driven boats. The place is also famous for the 'Pakora' stalls.

- Naray a natural spring which is used as a public bath.
- Cricket Stadium

== Demographics ==
=== Population ===
Historical population
Year	Pop.	±% p.a.
1951	5,668	—
1961	8,507	+4.14%
1972	13,644	+4.39%
1981	14,504	+0.68%
1998	19,871	+1.87%
2017	35,737	+3.14%
2023	40,711	+2.20%

As of the 2023 census, Nawan Shehr had a population of 40,711.

=== Religion ===
Religious groups in Nawan Shehr City (1881−1941) (Note: 1881-1941: Data for the entirety of the town of Nawan Shehr, which included Nawan Shehr Municipality and Nawan Shehr Notified Area.)
Religious group	1881		1901		1911		1921		1931		1941	
Religious group	Pop.	%	Pop.	%	Pop.	%	Pop.	%	Pop.	%	Pop.	%
Islam	3,251	75.48%	2,939	71.44%	3,404	73.03%	3,794	74.51%	3,884	75.71%	5,075	79.12%
Hinduism (Note: 1931-1941: Including Ad-Dharmis)	1,056	24.52%	995	24.19%	1,069	22.93%	1,052	20.66%	883	17.21%	1,030	16.06%
Sikhism	0	0%	180	4.38%	188	4.03%	246	4.83%	363	7.08%	309	4.82%
Jainism	0	0%	0	0%	0	0%	0	0%	0	0%	—N/a	—N/a
Christianity	—N/a	—N/a	0	0%	0	0%	0	0%	0	0%	0	0%
Zoroastrianism	—N/a	—N/a	0	0%	0	0%	0	0%	0	0%	0	0%
Judaism	—N/a	—N/a	0	0%	0	0%	0	0%	0	0%	0	0%
Buddhism	—N/a	—N/a	0	0%	0	0%	0	0%	0	0%	—N/a	—N/a
Others	0	0%	0	0%	0	0%	0	0%	0	0%	0	0%
Total population	4,307	100%	4,114	100%	4,661	100%	5,092	100%	5,130	100%	6,414	100%

== Notable people ==
- Muhamad Iqbal KhanLambardar,ex Nazim and District Member
- Dr Moazzam KhanCardiologist and Social Worker
- Late Lambardar Abdullah Khan Imranzai
