= Kukmang Union Council =

Town in Pakistan

Kukmang
- Union council
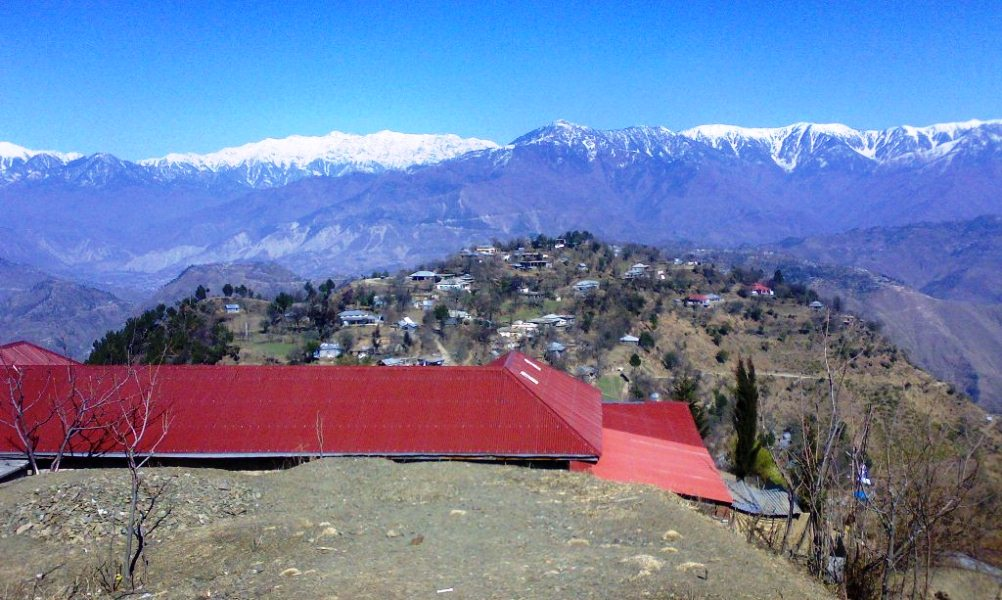
- Beautiful view of Pir Panjal Mountain range from Kukmang
- Interactive map of Kukmang
- Coordinates: 34°16′20″N 73°25′30″E
- Country: Pakistan
- Province: Khyber-Pakhtunkhwa
- District: Abbottabad
- Tehsil: Abbottabad

Government
  - Tehsil Member: Muhammad Hanif

Population (2017 Census of Pakistan)
  - Total: 12,117

Kukmang is a residential town and one of the 51 union councils of Abbottabad District in Khyber-Pakhtunkhwa province of Pakistan. Most of the families living in Kukmang belong to Abbasi (Sararra, Dhund) and Qureshi clans. According to the 2023 census the total population was 10,251 of which 5,102 were males and 5,149 were females, overall literacy was 75.3% which was 88.2% for males and 62.5% for females. 10,230 inhabitants were recorded as being Muslim in the census with 21 listed as others. Kukmong, like Abbottabad District in general, is vulnerable to landslides, earthquake and heavy rain, 1,921 homes were identified as needing reconstruction after the 2005 earthquake. In 2022 it was announced that Kukmang was one of several Union Councils in the district to benefit from road projects to improve infrastructure.

== Location ==
Kukmang is located at 34°16'20N 73°25'30E and has an average elevation of 1208 metres (3966 feet). It is situated in the North East of the district, it borders Boi to the North. River Kunhar to its North East, Pattan Kalan lies to the south-southeast, and Rankot to the north-west and Thandiani to its South West. To the east, beyond the Kunhar River, lies the fabulous snow-covered Pir Panjal mountain range of Kashmir.

== Elections ==
In the 2015 elections Upper Kukmang, Central Kukmang and Kukmang each returned returned 9 candidates:

Kukmang

Name of returned candidate	Role	Seat category	Address
Abdul Hameed	Nazim	General Seat	Deweli Bandi Abbottabad
Muhammad Javed	Naib Nazim	General Seat	Kothiala Abbottabad
Aurangzeb	Councillor	General Seat	Kukmar Kukmang Abbottabad
Muhammad Iqbal	Councillor	General Seat	Kukmar Kukmang Abbottabad
Muhammad Siraj Abbasi	Councillor	General Seat	Kukmar Kukmang Abbottabad
Muhammad Ramzan	Councillor	General Seat	Naryat Kukmang Abbottabad
Shahnaz Begum	Councillor	Women	Kukmar Kukmang Abbottabad
Zohra Bibi	Councillor	Women	Taryat Kukmang Abbottabad
Dildar Khan	Councillor	Peasants/Workers	Devli Bandi Kukmang Abbottabad
Muhammad Shahzad	Councillor	Youth	Kukmar Abbottabad

Upper Kukmang: Upper Kukmang:

Name of returned candidate	Role	Seat category	Address
Muhammad Iftikhar	Nazim	General Seat	Kukmang Abbottabad
Muhammad Azeem	Naib Nazim	General Seat	Talkandi Abbottabad
Muhammad Habib	Councillor	General Seats	Talkandi Abbottabad
Muhammad Siddique	Councillor	General Seat	Talkandi Abbottabad
Mujeeb Ur Rehman	Councillor	General Seats	Talkandi Abbottabad
Hussan Bano	Councillor	Women	Kuklmang Abbottabad
Iram Bibi	Councillor	Women	Talkandi Abbottabad
Muhammad Javed	Councillor	Peasants/Workers	Talkandi Abbottabad
Mehtab Ahmed	Councillor	Youth	Talkandi Abbottabad

Central Kukmang:

Name of returned candidate	Role	Seat category	Address
Muhammad Sabir Khan	Nazim	General Seat	Kukmang Abbottabad
Ali Ur Rehman	Naib Nazim	General Seat	Gandiala Kukmang
Muhammad Raees	Councillor	General Seats	Kukmang Abbottabad
Muhammad Irshad	Councillor	General Seat	Doga Kukmang
Muhammad Zubair	Councillor	General Seat	Kukmang Atd
Ghazala Bibi	Councillor	Women	Doga Kukmang Abbottabad
Nusrat Parveen	Councillor	Women	Kukmang Atd
Gulzar Ahmed	Councillor	Peasants/Workers	Kukmang Atd
Waqar Younis	Councillor	Youth	Pathar Gali Abbottabad

== Weather ==
Kukmang features different climates due to its high altitude at one end e.g. from Haryala to Kukmar and low altitude at other end e.g. from Devli / Bandi to Palhair. The villages which are on higher altitude have cold and snowy winters, relatively cool summer with drastically escalated rain, in relation with lower altitudes, and frequent fog. The temperature can rise as high as 35 °C during the mid-summer in lower altitudes and drop below 0 °C during the winter months.

In January 2021 a charity handed out blankets to the needy.
