= Bag-Notar =

- Village
- Location within Khyber Pakhtunkhwa Location within Pakistan
- Coordinates: 34°7′38″N 73°20′34″E
- Country: Pakistan
- Province: Khyber Pakhtunkhwa
- District: Abbottabad
- Tehsil: Abbottabad
- Union Council: Bagnotar

Population (2017)
  - Total: 4,158

Bag-Notar is a village in Bagnotar Union Council, Abbottabad Tehsil, Abbottabad District, Khyber Pakhtunkhwa, Pakistan. According to the 2017 Census of Pakistan, the population of Bag-Notar is 4,158.
