= Nambal =

Nambal may refer to the following populated places in Pakistan:

- Nambal, Punjab, near Rawalpindi
- Nambal, Khyber Pakhtunkhwa, in Abbottabad District
