= Kehal Urban =

Coordinates: 34°12′30″N 73°29′00″E

- Union council
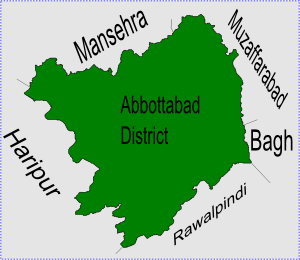
- Kehal Urban
- Interactive map of Kehal Urban
- Country: Pakistan
- Province: Khyber-Pakhtunkhwa
- District: Abbottabad
- Tehsil: Abbottabad

Government
  - Zilla Nazim: Sardar Sherbahadur
  - Tehsil Nazim: Adil Abbasi
  - Kisaan Councillor: Sardar Iftikhar Ahmed
  - Youth Councillor: Adnan Wajid
  - Lady Councillor I: Dai Hukamjan
  - Lady Councillor II: Rozeena Bashir

Kehal Urban is one of the 51 union councils of Abbottabad District in Khyber-Pakhtunkhwa province of Pakistan. It is located in the west of the district.
