= Rach Behn Union Council =

Rach Behn
- Union Council
- Country: Pakistan
- Province: Khyber Pakhtunkhwa
- District: Abbottabad
- Tehsil: Abbottabad

Population (2017)
  - Total: 4,720

Rach Behn is a union council of Abbottabad District in Khyber-Pakhtunkhwa province of Pakistan. According to the 2017 Census of Pakistan, the population was 4,720, and according to the 2023 census the population was 5,432 of which 2,759 were males and 2,673 female.

== Subdivisions ==
Demographic and Area Data from 2023 Census
Village	Total Population	Males	Females	Area (acres)
Banda Jaghian	519	265	254	173
Chatrhi	663	323	340	292
Rach Behn	2,382	1,210	1,172	824
Sohlan Bala	1,173	594	579	712
Sohlan Tarli	326	183	143	133
Thathi Faqir Sahib	369	184	185	525
