= Bagnotar =

Administrative subdivision or Union Council in Abbottabad District, Pakistan

Bagnotar باجنوتار
- Union Council
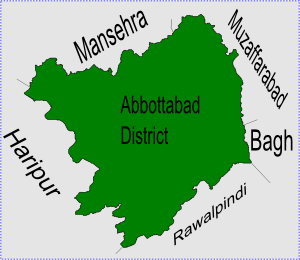
- Interactive map of Bagnotar
- Coordinates: 34°7′0″N 73°20′0″E
- Country: Pakistan
- Province: Khyber Pakhtunkhwa
- District: Abbottabad
- Tehsil: Abbottabad

Government
  - Member District Council: Sardar Saeed Anwer, Dist Nazim.
  - Member Tehsil Council: Sardar Shuja Ahmed

Population (2017 Census of Pakistan)
  - Total: 981,590 (population of Abbottabad Tehsil)

Bagnotar is a union council of Abbottabad District in Khyber-Pakhtunkhwa province of Pakistan. Bagnator is situated on the Abbottabad-Nathi Gali Road some 18 kilometers away from Abbottabad. According to the 2023 census the total population was 16,638 of which 8,448 were male and 8,190 female. The area is popular with domestic tourists who are keen to see snowfall and enjoy other activities.

== Location ==
The Union Council of Bagnotar is situated in the central part of Abbottabad District and is part of Abbottabad Tehsil, it lies to south east of the city of Abbottabad;– the capital city of the district. The area is included in the Lower Galliyat Belt. The main tribes of Bagnotar are the Sardars (karlal) and Jadoons. However, other small groups like Awan, Pathan, Raja, Chohan (Nai), Abbasi and some Kashmiris are also settled in the area. Bagnotar is bounded by the following union councils, to the north by Sarbhana, and Beerangali, to the east Nagri Bala & Nathiagali, and to the south by Namli Maira and Phalkot, and to the west by Bagh.

Bagnotar town has an elevation of 1882 metres, and is located approximately 16 km from Abbottabad on Abbottabad-Murree Road. A lush green pine valley stretched on 810 square kilometres. The major landscape as well as the settlement of Bagnotar is located along the Barrian-Nathigali-Abbottabad Road (Abbottabad Murree Road), the 11 kilometres of which passes through the land of Bagnotar.

== Subdivisions ==
Union Council Bagnotar has three subdivisions known as the "village councils", these are:

- Bag-Notar
- Bandi Mera
- Chhan

== Politics ==
In 2010, there was a popular movement for the creation of Hazara Province - local people in Bagnotar seemed supportive of this aim by the political group Tehreek-e-Hazara.

== 2005 earthquake ==
On 8 October 2005, various parts of Abbottabad District were affected by the Pakistan earthquake. Unlike neighbouring Kashmir, the loss in human life was relatively low in this area, with 511 dead and 622 injured. Although the impact on infrastructure was still severe.
