= Kakol Union Council =

Kakol
- Union Council
- Country: Pakistan
- Province: Khyber Pakhtunkhwa
- District: Abbottabad
- Tehsil: Abbottabad

Population (2017)
  - Total: 14,924

Kakol is one of the 51 union councils of Abbottabad District in Khyber-Pakhtunkhwa province of Pakistan. According to the 2017 Census of Pakistan, the population is 14,924.

== Subdivisions ==
- Balolia
- Kakol
- Mandroch Kalan
- Mandroch Khurd
