= Mor Kalan =

Coordinates: 34°14′N 73°13′E

- Country: Pakistan
- Province: Khyber Pakhtunkhwa
- District: Abbottabad
- Tehsil: Abbottabad
- Union Council: Bal Dheri

Population (2017)
  - Total: 3,454

Mor Kalan is an area of Bal Dheri Union Council, Abbottabad Tehsil, Abbottabad District, Khyber Pakhtunkhwa, Pakistan. According to the 2017 Census of Pakistan, the population is 3,454.
