= Sial Kot Union Council =

Sial Kot
- Union Council
- Country: Pakistan
- Province: Khyber Pakhtunkhwa
- District: Abbottabad
- Tehsil: Abbottabad

Population (2017)
  - Total: 14,141

Sial Kot is one of the 51 union councils of Abbottabad District in Khyber-Pakhtunkhwa province of Pakistan. According to the 2017 Census of Pakistan, the population is 14,141.

== Subdivisions ==
- Bandi Sararha
- Banota
- Chamiali
- Khokhriala
- Larri
- Sial Kot
