= Pawa Union Council =

Town in Pakistan

Pawa
- Union council
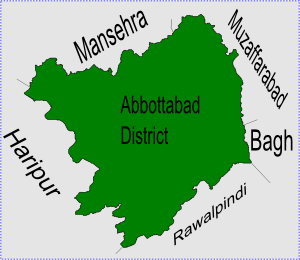
- Pawa is located in Abbottabad District
- Interactive map of Pawa
- Coordinates: 34°12′0″N 73°10′0″E
- Country: Pakistan
- Province: Khyber Pakhtunkhwa
- District: Abbottabad
- Tehsil: Abbottabad

Population (2017)
  - Total: 11,555

Pawa is a residential town and one of the 51 union councils of Abbottabad District in the Khyber Pakhtunkhwa province of Pakistan. According to the 2023 census it had a population of 11,908 of which 5,941 were males and 5,967 females.

== Location ==
The union council of Pawa is situated in the North West of the district (and to the north west of Abbottabad city) towards Mansehra District. Neighbouring union councils are Kothiala to the south and [UC Jhangi] to the East. Pawa town has an average elevation of 1350 metres (4432 feet).
