= Chhan, Abbottabad =

Chhan
- Village
- Country: Pakistan
- Province: Khyber Pakhtunkhwa
- District: Abbottabad
- Tehsil: Abbottabad
- Union Council: Bagnotar

Population (2017)
  - Total: 2,234

Chhan (or Chahan) is a village in Bagnotar Union Council, Abbottabad Tehsil, Abbottabad District, Khyber Pakhtunkhwa, Pakistan. According to the 2017 Census of Pakistan, the population of Chhan is 2,234, with a total of 357 households.
