= Chatri Union Council =

Chatri
- Union Council
- Country: Pakistan
- Province: Khyber Pakhtunkhwa
- District: Abbottabad
- Tehsil: Abbottabad

Population (2017)
  - Total: 13,833

Chatri is one of the 51 union councils of Abbottabad District in Khyber-Pakhtunkhwa province of Pakistan. According to the 2017 Census of Pakistan, the population is 13,833.

== Subdivisions ==
- Bandi Mansoor
- Chatri
- Gali Banian
- Kathwal
- Mera Rehmat Khan
- Mohar Kalan
