= Bandi Mera =

- Village
- Country: Pakistan
- Province: Khyber Pakhtunkhwa
- District: Abbottabad
- Tehsil: Abbottabad
- Union Council: Bagnotar

Population (2017)
  - Total: 7,470

Bandi Mera is a village in Bagnotar Union Council, Abbottabad Tehsil, Abbottabad District, Khyber Pakhtunkhwa, Pakistan. Chamm Rajput, Thathi Chathernath are popular areas of bandi mera with beautiful sceneries, traditionally built houses and warm welcoming people. According to the 2017 Census of Pakistan, the population of Bandi Mera is 7,470.
