= Lakhala Union Council =

Lakhala
- Union Council
- Country: Pakistan
- Province: Khyber Pakhtunkhwa
- District: Abbottabad
- Tehsil: Abbottabad

Population (2017)
  - Total: 5,237

Lakhala is a union council of Abbottabad District in Khyber-Pakhtunkhwa province of Pakistan. According to the 2017 Census of Pakistan, the population is 5,237.

== Subdivisions ==
- Gandah
- Kangrora
- Khanda Khoh
- Lakhala
- Pind
