= Seri Sher Shah =

Coordinates: 34°11′N 73°00′E

- Union Council
- Location within Khyber Pakhtunkhwa Location within Pakistan
- Country: Pakistan
- Province: Khyber Pakhtunkhwa
- District: Abbottabad
- Tehsil: Abbottabad

Population (2017)
  - Total: 4,433

Seri Sher Shah is a patwar circle within the Pind Kargoo Khan Union Council, Abbottabad District in Khyber-Pakhtunkhwa province of Pakistan. According to the 2017 Census of Pakistan, the population is 4,433.

== Subdivisions ==
- Bandi Nikra
- Bareela
- Bashah Kalan
- Bashah Khurd
- Chahar
- Chatha
- Dandhara
- Kangar Bala
- Pohar
- Rata
- Seri Sher Shah
