= Mojohan =

Coordinates: 34°12′30″N 73°29′0″E

- Union council
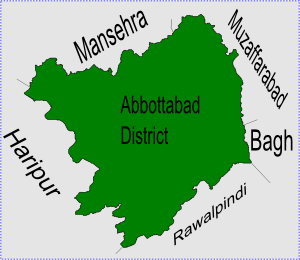
- Mojohan
- Interactive map of Mojohan
- Country: Pakistan
- Province: Khyber-Pakhtunkhwa
- District: Abbottabad

Government
  - Nazim: Muhammad Ashraf Khan
  - Naib Nazim: Muhammad Ramzan (Kala Khan)

Mojohan is one of the 51 union councils of Abbottabad District in Khyber-Pakhtunkhwa province of Pakistan. It is located in the west of the district.
