= Haveliani Urban =

Coordinates: 34.0000°N 73.0000°E

Havelian Urban
- Union council
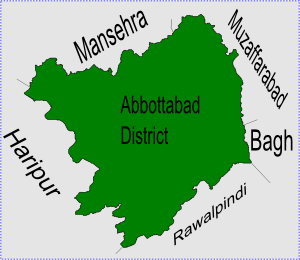
- Haveliani Urban
- Interactive map of Havelian Urban
- Country: Pakistan
- Province: Khyber-Pakhtunkhwa
- District: Abbottabad
- Tehsil: Havelian

Government
  - Nazim: Babu Javed Iqbal
  - Naib Nazim: Amjad Tanoli

Population
  - Total: 20,566

Havelian Urban is one of the 51 union councils of Abbottabad District in Khyber-Pakhtunkhwa province of Pakistan. It is located in the west of the district.
