= Sambli Dheri Union Council =

Sambli Dheri
- Union Council
- Country: Pakistan
- Province: Khyber Pakhtunkhwa
- District: Abbottabad
- Tehsil: Abbottabad

Population (2017)
  - Total: 8,549

Sambli Dheri is one of the 51 union councils of Abbottabad District in Khyber-Pakhtunkhwa province of Pakistan. According to the 2017 Census of Pakistan, the population is 8,549.

== Subdivisions ==
- Bandi Hamza
- Bandi Pahar
- Chak
- Gali Mohri
- Phogran
- Sambli Dheri
