= Bal Dheri =

- Country: Pakistan
- Province: Khyber Pakhtunkhwa
- District: Abbottabad
- Tehsil: Abbottabad
- Union Council: Bal Dheri

Population (2017)
  - Total: 10,619

Bal Dheri is the chief village of Bal Dheri Union Council, Abbottabad Tehsil, Abbottabad District, Khyber Pakhtunkhwa, Pakistan. According to the 2017 Census of Pakistan, the population is 10,619.
