= Bandi Dhundan Union Council =

Bandi Dhundan
- Union Council
- Country: Pakistan
- Province: Khyber Pakhtunkhwa
- District: Abbottabad
- Tehsil: Abbottabad

Population (2017)
  - Total: 27,764

Bandi Dhundan is one of the 51 union councils of Abbottabad District in Khyber-Pakhtunkhwa province of Pakistan. According to the 2017 Census of Pakistan, the population is 27,764. Marjan- sub cast of Awan tribe Dominate this area.

== Subdivisions ==
- Banda Pir Khan
- Bandi Dhundan
