= Kothiala Union Council =

Kothiala Abbottabad
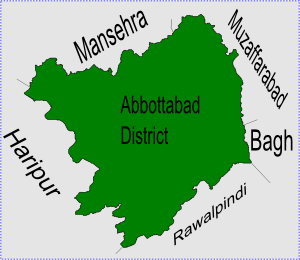
- Kothiala is located in District Abbottabad
- Interactive map of Kothiala Abbottabad
- Coordinates: 34.1734672°N 73.127462°E
- Country: Pakistan
- Province: Khyber-Pakhtunkhwa
- District: Abbottabad
- Tehsil: Abbottabad

Population (2017)
  - Total: 15,031
- Website: www.Kuthiala.tk

Kothiala is one of the Union councils of Tehsil Sherwan district Abbottabad in Khyber-Pakhtunkhwa province of Pakistan. There area a lot of kathas (streams) flowing through the valley so it is called Kuthiala.

== Subdivisions ==
- Gheley
- Gup
- Joghan Mar
- Kothiala
- Mukhdabi
- Nallah
- Paswal
- Salyut
- Sobra
- Tahli
- Todoo
- Salyot

== Tribes ==
The main tribes inhabiting are:

- Tanoli
- Awan
- Rajputs
- Gujar
- Syed

== Important sites ==
- Mazar Gazi Badshah Gali Syedian.
- Mazar Shah Mian Chakully.
- Cave of Baba Shah Mian Chakully.
- Stone lion Sketch Soben Gali.
- Balyana Top Above 6500 feet Height.
- Toorn a stream near hall syedian

== Facilities ==
Basic Facilities are available in Kuthiala i.e.

- Electricity
- Road
- High Schools
- Telephone
- Mobile Network
- Hospital
- Water Supply Scheme
- 24 Hours Transport
- bank (HBL)
- post office

== Hospitals ==
There is BHU in Kuthiala where an MBBS Doctor performer duty at the daytime. 24 hour private doctor available in Naka gali.

== Education ==
In Kuthiala Education facilities are available i.e.

- Gov Boys High School
- Gov Girls High School
- Fatima Jinnah public School
- Sir syed public School

== Language & culture ==
In Kuthialia, Hindko, Urdu language is spoken.
