= Bagan Union Council =

Bagan
- Union Council
- Country: Pakistan
- Province: Khyber Pakhtunkhwa
- District: Abbottabad
- Tehsil: Abbottabad

Population (2017 Census of Pakistan)
  - Total: 11,512

Bagan is a union council of Abbottabad District in Khyber-Pakhtunkhwa province of Pakistan. According to the 2017 Census of Pakistan, the population was 11,512, in 2023 it had risen to 11,888 of which 6,036 were males and 5,852 female.
