= Kuthwal =

- Union council
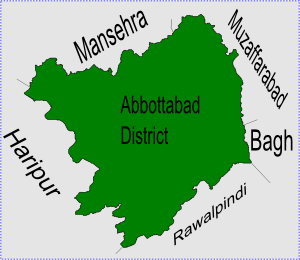
- Kathwal is located in Abbottabad District
- Interactive map of Kuthwal
- Coordinates: 34°11′40″N 73°18′50″E
- Country: Pakistan
- Province: Khyber-Pakhtunkhwa
- District: Abbottabad
- Tehsil: Abbottabad

Government
  - Nazim: Muhammad Irshad
  - Naib Nazim: Chan Zeb Mughal

Kuthwal is one of the 51 union councils of Abbottabad District in the Khyber-Pakhtunkhwa province of Pakistan. It is located to the north west of Abbottabad city (the district capital).

== Villages ==
The main villages of this Union Council (UC) are Kuthwal (Well known mohallah: School Wali Gali), Bandi Mansoor (Major mohallahs: Patotay, Chandroll), Gali Banian, Chattri Balla, Danna Sharif, Maira Rehmat Khan, Mohar Kalan and Chattri Khurd. This union council is gateway to Thandiani pass. The road route passing form the area diverges to three major routes at the end, each leading to Thandiani, Kukmang to Boi and Pattan to Muzaffarabad (Azad Jammu & Kashmir). The first village en route is Gali Banian which actually consists of two villages, Gali and Banian. The main tribe is Awans with good number of Abbasi, Mughals, Syeds and Good Number of Turks(Raja). Two link roads lead from Gali, one goes to Banian and other to Danna Sharif. The village Gali is known for having the first Jamia mosque of the area, having separate madrassa for boys. Mohar Kalan Is Famous for Turk Tribe.
