= Salhad Union Council =

Salhad
- Union council
- Location of Salhad Union Council (highlighted in red) within Abbottabad District, the names of neighbouring districts to Abbottabad are also shown
- Country: Pakistan
- Province: Khyber Pakhtunkhwa
- District: Abbottabad
- Tehsil: Abbottabad Tehsil

Government
  - Nazim: Zahid Gul
  - Naib Nazim: Asif Khan

Population (2017)
  - Total: 36,018

Salhad is one of the 51 union councils (sub-divisions) of Abbottabad District in the Khyber-Pakhtunkhwa province of Pakistan.

The Union Council of Salhad is named after what was the main village of the area, but has now effectively become a suburb of Abbottabad city. It is situated about two kilometers south of the current city limits of Abbottabad.

== Subdivisions ==
Landscape in Salhad union council

According to the 2023 the Union Council of Salhad had a population 38,503 of which 19,710 were males and 18,791 female.

- Salhad
- Khokhar

== History of Salhad ==
Salhad is a historic and culturally rich village located in the city of Abbottabad, within the Khyber Pakhtunkhwa province of Pakistan. It holds the status of a Union Council, playing a vital role in the local administrative framework. Nestled amidst the picturesque hills of Abbottabad, Salhad has evolved from a small rural settlement into a vibrant and well-connected community while preserving its traditional values and heritage.

=== Origins and Early History ===
The name "Salhad" has deep-rooted historical significance, possibly derived from local linguistic influences or early settlers. The village has long been inhabited by indigenous Pashtun and Hindko-speaking communities, whose ancestors were primarily engaged in agriculture, livestock farming, and trade. Over time, Salhad became an important stopover for traders and travelers due to its strategic location near Abbottabad city.

=== British Colonial Era ===
During the Second Sikh War James Abbott chasing Chatar Singh's forces arrived in the village of Salhad, Abbot wrote the following about arriving in the village:

"I had reached the village of Sulhud, wearied with a march of thirty miles, under the scorching sun of August a march in which one of my men died of thirst. Released for a few hours from the sultry and oppressive atmosphere of Nara, I had inhaled with delight the pure, cold breeze rushing down that cleft of the mountains where I had halted, had dined luxuri-ously upon the fresh bread and milk which the peasant of Huzara readily shares with travellers, and after posting my matchlockmen in the pass, had fallen asleep in the open air as I watched the beautiful stars tracing their circles in the Heaven."

The respite was short-lived however as Abbott received word from Nicholson that Chatar Singh had outwitted him and thus he needed to leave Salhad and march with his troops once more.

During the British rule in the 19th and early 20th centuries, Abbottabad gained prominence as a cantonment and an administrative center. As part of Abbottabad’s development, Salhad also saw infrastructural growth, benefiting from roads, schools, and other public services introduced by the colonial administration. The British influence can still be seen in some of the old structures and educational institutions in the region.

=== Post-Independence Development ===
After Pakistan’s independence in 1947, Salhad continued to grow, benefiting from the expansion of Abbottabad as an educational and military hub. The establishment of Pakistan Military Academy and the rise of Abbottabad as a center for education and commerce contributed to Salhad’s progress. Over the decades, better connectivity, improved educational facilities, and an increase in trade opportunities enhanced the quality of life in the area.

=== Cultural and Social Aspects ===
Salhad is known for its rich cultural heritage, deeply influenced by Pashtun and Hindko traditions. The local population is primarily composed of Hindko speakers and consists of the Jadoon, Mughal, Gujjar, Awan, Tanoli, Qureshis and Gakhar communities. In addition, a smaller number of Syeds, and Karlals also reside here. Some families of Afghan refugees have also settled in the area., with a strong sense of community and hospitality. Traditional festivals, weddings, and social gatherings remain integral to the village’s cultural identity. The influence of modernization is visible, yet the people of Salhad maintain their customs and values with great pride.

=== Modern-Day Salhad ===
Today, Salhad is a well-established union council with access to essential facilities such as schools, healthcare centers, markets, and roads. It has become a desirable residential area due to its proximity to Abbottabad city. Many residents are involved in business, government jobs, and overseas employment, contributing to the economic stability of the region.
