= Dalola Union Council =

Dalola
- Union Council
- Location of Dalola Union Council (highlighted in red) within Abbottabad district, the names of the neighbouring districts to Abbottabad are also shown.
- Interactive map of Dalola
- Coordinates: 34°21′20″N 73°23′50″E
- Country: Pakistan
- Province: Khyber-Pakhtunkhwa
- District: Abbottabad
- Tehsil: Abbottabad

Government
  - district member: Zaheer abbasi
  - tehsil member: Abdullah abbasi

Population
  - Total: 18,900

Dalola is one of the 51 union councils (sub-divisions) of Abbottabad District in Khyber-Pakhtunkhwa province of Pakistan.

== Location ==
Dalola is located at 34°21'20N 73°23'50E and has an average elevation of 798 metres (2621 ft). Dalola is the most north-eastern part of the district, it borders U.C Karnol & Garhi Habibullah of Mansehra District to the north and the River Kunhar and Muzaffarabad District of Kashmir to the east. To the south lies U.C Boi and to the west situated Tarnawai (U.C Banda Pir Khan). It was hit by the Pakistan earthquake in 2005.

== Subdivisions ==
According to the 1998 census, the Union Council of Dalola had a population 18,900, by the time of the 2017 census, the total population was recorded as being 24,470, of which 12,258 were males, 12,209 were females and three identifying as transgender.

The union council is subdivided into the following areas:

2017 Census Data
Name	Total Population	Male	Female	Trans
Dabban	3,276	1,656	1,620	-
Dalola	18,660	9,340	9,317	3
Naroka	2,534	1,262	1,272	-
