= Sheikhul Bandi =

Sheikh ul Bandi
- Union council
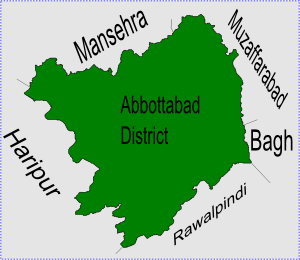
- Sheikh-ul-Bandi is located in Abbottabad District
- Interactive map of Sheikh ul Bandi
- Coordinates: 34°9′0″N 73°14′0″E
- Country: Pakistan
- Province: Khyber-Pakhtunkhwa
- District: Abbottabad
- Tehsil: Abbottabad

Government
  - Nazim: Fahad Khan Jadoon
  - Naib Nazim: Nabeel Khan Jadoon

Population (2017)
  - Total: 26,158

Sheikh ul Bandi is one of the 51 union councils (sub-divisions) of Abbottabad District in Khyber-Pakhtunkhwa province of Pakistan. The Union council takes its name from a neighbourhood which is 3 km (1.9 mi) from the city of Abbottabad. It is located at 34° 8' 60N, 73° 13' 60E, in the valley toward the north-west of the Sarban Hills. It is considered as one of the oldest village of Abbottabad.

== Languages ==
The main language is Hindko, Pashto, although Urdu is also spoken and understood.

== Ethnic groups ==
The predominant ethnic groups of Sheikh ul Bandi are the Jadoons and Syeds. However, there are other minority ethnic groups such as the Sardars, Awans, Mughals, and Dhund Abbasi who live there as well.
