= Thathi Faqir Sahib =

- Union council
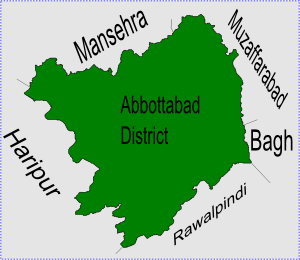
- Thathi Faqir Sahib is located in Abbottabad District
- Country: Pakistan
- Province: Khyber-Pakhtunkhwa
- District: Abbottabad

Population
  - Total: 9,000

Thathi Faqir Sahib is one of the 46 Union Councils of Abbottabad District in Khyber-Pakhtunkhwa province of Pakistan. It is located in Abbottabad Tehsil and according to the 2023 census it had a total population of 369, of which 184 were male and 185 female.

== Location ==
The union council of Thathi Faqir Sahib is situated in the northwest of Abbottabad district to the northwest of the city). It is located in a valley, surrounded by large, forested mountains on three sides.
