= Rialah Union Council =

Rialah
- Union Council
- Country: Pakistan
- Province: Khyber Pakhtunkhwa
- District: Abbottabad
- Tehsil: Abbottabad

Population (2017)
  - Total: 13,562

Rialah is one of the 51 union councils of Abbottabad District in Khyber-Pakhtunkhwa province of Pakistan. According to the 2017 Census of Pakistan, the population is 13,562.

== Subdivisions ==
According to the 2023 census the Union Council of Rialah has a population of 10,492 of which 5,252 are male and 5,240 female.

Demographic and Area Data from 2023 Census
Village	Total Population	Males	Females	Area (acres)
Kalaban	731	382	349	431
Longal	1,351	649	702	394
Malkot	4,046	1,984	2,062	1,131
Rialah	4,364	2,237	2,127	1,324
