= Kassaki Kalan Union Council =

Kassaki Kalan
- Union Council
- Country: Pakistan
- Province: Khyber Pakhtunkhwa
- District: Abbottabad
- Tehsil: Abbottabad

Population (2017)
  - Total: 12,434

Kassaki Kalan is a union council of Abbottabad District in Khyber-Pakhtunkhwa province of Pakistan. According to the 2017 Census of Pakistan, the population is 12,434.

== Subdivisions ==
- Baghati
- Bain Gojri
- Bain Noora
- Banseri
- Bhoraj
- Botiala
- Darobarh
- Jatal
- Kassaki Kalan
- Kassaki Khurd
- Mehal
- Thana
