= Bandi Atti Khan =

Bandi Attai Khan
- Union Council
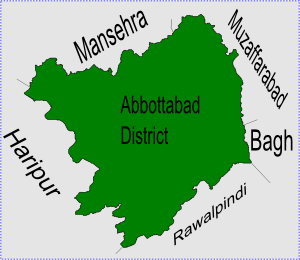
- Bandi Attai Khan is located in Abbottabad District
- Interactive map of Bandi Attai Khan
- Coordinates: 34°3′N 73°13′E
- Country: Pakistan
- Province: Khyber-Pakhtunkhwa
- District: Abbottabad
- Tehsil: Abbottabad

Population
  - Total: 13,853

Bandi Attai Khan (also known as Banda Attai Khan) is one of the 51 union councils of Abbottabad District in Khyber-Pakhtunkhwa province of Pakistan.
