= Banda Qazi Union Council =

Administrative subdivision or Union Council in Pakistan

Banda Qazi
- Union Council
- Country: Pakistan
- Province: Khyber Pakhtunkhwa
- District: Abbottabad
- Tehsil: Abbottabad

Population (2017 Census of Pakistan)
  - Total: 12,064

Banda Qazi is one of the 51 union councils of Abbottabad District in Khyber-Pakhtunkhwa province of Pakistan. According to the 2017 Census of Pakistan, the population is 12,064.
