= Qasba Abbatabad Union Council =

Qasba Abbatabad
- Union Council
- Country: Pakistan
- Province: Khyber Pakhtunkhwa
- District: Abbottabad
- Tehsil: Abbottabad

Population (2017)
  - Total: 3,189

Qasba Abbatabad is a union council of Abbottabad District in Khyber-Pakhtunkhwa province of Pakistan. According to the 2017 Census of Pakistan, the population is 3,189.

== Subdivisions ==
- Qasba Abbatabad
- Rakh Civil Military
