= Jhangra =

- Union Council
- Location within Pakistan
- Coordinates: 34°1′0″N 73°8′0″E
- Country: Pakistan
- Province: Khyber-Pakhtunkhwa
- District: Abbottabad
- Tehsil: Havelian

Population
  - Total: 24,062

Jhangra is a small town and one of the 51 Union councils of Abbottabad District in Khyber-Pakhtunkhwa province of Pakistan. It is located in the southwest of the district. The popular language spoken is Hindko.

Jahangra Dam, which is being constructed around 3 km away from Jhangra Village, will benefit the residents of Kashka, Jhangra and Mohra Mohri Village and help meet their agricultural requirements and other water based needs.

== Subdivisions ==
The Union Council of Jhangra is administratively subdivided into the following areas: Chamba, Darooni Maira, Havelian Village, Jhangra, Kalu Maira, Mala, Nowshera, Sultanpur. Kashka, Pungran, Wazeera and Ratidheri .

Jhangra is a very old village where before the Partition of Indo-Pak, only Hindus, Sikhs, and Muslims lived, but after the Partition in 1947, all non-Muslims left this area.
