= Nawan Shehr Janubi =

- Union Council, Town
- Country: Pakistan
- Province: Khyber Pakhtunkhwa
- District: Abbottabad
- Tehsil: Abbottabad

Population (2017)
  - Total: 7,951

Nawan Shehr Janubi is a union council and town of Abbottabad District in Khyber-Pakhtunkhwa province of Pakistan. According to the 2017 Census of Pakistan, the population is 7,951.
