= Beeran Gali =

Coordinates: 34°11′40″N 73°21′50″E

Biran Gali
- Union Council
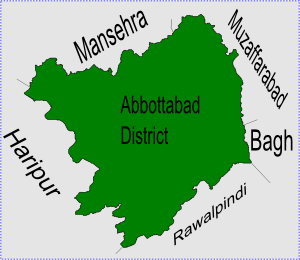
- Berin Gali is located in Abbottabad District.
- Interactive map of Biran Gali
- Country: Pakistan
- Province: Khyber-Pakhtunkhwa
- District: Abbottabad
- Tehsil: Abbottabad

Government
  - [Member District Council [Nazim]: Sardar Muhammad Junaid Chairman 92-300-5858611

Population
  - Total: 12,329

Beeran Gali (also known as Biran Gali or Baran Gali) is a union council of Abbottabad District,Limited Environmental Assessment for Rural Housing in Earthquake affected Area in the Khyber Pakhtunkhwa province of Pakistan. It is located approximately 20 km from Abbottabad city.

== History ==
In the 1890s. Beeran Gali, also referred to as Beerun Gulee, was mentioned by British geologist Charles Stewart Middlemiss when he was doing a survey of the area as part of his geological fieldwork in Hazara for the colonial-era Geological Survey of India.

== Topography ==
The area is situated between two mountains, Thandiani and Miranjani. It is located at 34°11'40N 73°21'50E and has an average elevation of 2176 metres (7142 feet) above sea-level.

== Subdivisions ==
The Union Council is subdivided into the following areas:

- Andarseri
- Beerangali
- Jhafar

== Demographics ==
According to the 2017 Pakistani census, the population of Beeran Gali is 9,434. Ethnically, the main tribe is the Karlal, while the Quresh and Gujjar are also living in Ander Sari and Okhreela village of Beerangali union council.

== Education ==
There are two high schools, one each for boys and girls as well as numerous middle and primary schools.
