= Birot Khurd Union Council =

Birot Khurd
- Union Council
- Country: Pakistan
- Province: Khyber Pakhtunkhwa
- District: Abbottabad
- Tehsil: Abbottabad

Population (2017)
  - Total: 12,126

Birot Khurd is a union council of Abbottabad District in Khyber-Pakhtunkhwa province of Pakistan. According to the 2017 Census of Pakistan, the population is 12,126.

== Subdivisions ==
- Birot Khurd
- Kahoo Gharbi
