= Phalkot (Dhaki Khaiter) =

Pakistani administrative area

- Union council
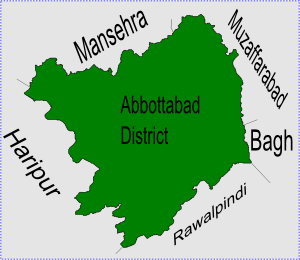
- Phalkot is located in Abbottabad District
- Interactive map of Phalkot
- Coordinates: 34°8′40″N 73°22′30″E
- Country: Pakistan
- Province: North-West Frontier Province
- District: Abbottabad

Phalkot is one of the 57 Union Councils of Abbottabad District in the North-West Frontier Province of Pakistan.

== Location ==
Malikpur (Janderbari) It is some 25 km away from Abbottabad city towards the north-east. Subdivisions: The Union Council is subdivided into four village councils Nakra, Janderbari, Jhulgran, Phalkot, Kutli - Sehana and Malsa, that include other settlements including Kutli Sehana Buni Gali and Upri Kutli. Malikpur Janderbari is the main village in UC having population of more than 15,000 people other vicinities are Malsa, Kutli & Sehana. Major cast is AWAN, whereas some Karlal are also resident in this UC. Major tribes are Baksial, Jalwal, Saghwal, Fekral, Langral, Bhadral, and Pirwaal.

Hindko is widely spoken throughout the area, Urdu being national language also spoken and understood. Most people are educated and the literacy ratio is around 85%

== Tribes ==
Most of the people are from the Awan tribe, but there are also other tribes in UC Phalkot.
