= Biran Gali Union Council =

Town in Pakistan

Biran Gali
- Union Council
- Country: Pakistan
- Province: Khyber Pakhtunkhwa
- District: Abbottabad
- Tehsil: Abbottabad

Population (2017 Census of Pakistan)
  - Total: 9,434

Biran Gali is a residential town and union council of Abbottabad District in Khyber-Pakhtunkhwa province of Pakistan. According to the 2017 Census of Pakistan, the population is 9,434.
