= Gojri Union Council =

Gojri
- Union Council
- Country: Pakistan
- Province: Khyber Pakhtunkhwa
- District: Abbottabad
- Tehsil: Abbottabad

Population (2017)
  - Total: 15,009

Gojri is one of the 51 union councils of Abbottabad District in Khyber-Pakhtunkhwa province of Pakistan. According to the 2017 Census of Pakistan, the population is 15,009.

== Subdivisions ==
- Gojri
- Halmera Tarla
- Halmera Utla
- Saji Kot
- Tanan
