= Kakot Union Council =

Kakot
- Union Council
- Country: Pakistan
- Province: Khyber Pakhtunkhwa
- District: Abbottabad
- Tehsil: Abbottabad

Population (2017)
  - Total: 7,815

Kakot is a union council of Abbottabad District in Khyber-Pakhtunkhwa province of Pakistan. According to the 2017 Census of Pakistan, the population is 7,815.

== Subdivisions ==
- Bandi Matratch
- Bazurgal
- Garamri
- Go Garhi
- Kakot
- Pando Thana
- Pasial
- Patheri Seydan
- Peshail
- Sargal
- Sher Bai
- Sial
- Talehar
