= Nawan Shehr Shumali =

- Union Council, Town
- Location within Khyber Pakhtunkhwa Location within Pakistan
- Coordinates: 34°9′33″N 73°14′13″E
- Country: Pakistan
- Province: Khyber Pakhtunkhwa
- District: Abbottabad
- Tehsil: Abbottabad

Population (2017)
  - Total: 6,798

Nawan Shehr Shumali is a union council and town of Abbottabad District in Khyber-Pakhtunkhwa province of Pakistan. According to the 2017 Census of Pakistan, the population is 6,798.
