= Kakol, Abbottabad =

Kakul
- Union council
- Location within Khyber Pakhtunkhwa Location within Pakistan
- Coordinates: 34°12′11″N 73°16′56″E
- Country: Pakistan
- District: Abbottabad
- Tehsil: Abbottabad
- Province: Khyber-Pakhtunkhwa

Population
  - Total: 30,000

Kakol, also known as Kakul, is a village situated in Abbottabad District in the Khyber Pakhtunkwa province of Pakistan. It is part of Abbottabad Tehsil and is located 5 km northeast of the centre of Abbottabad city near the Thandiani Hills at an elevation of 1532 metres.

Kakul is known for being the site of the Pakistan Military Academy, also known as PMA Kakul, it is the Officer Training Academy of the Pakistan Army. The posterior gate of PMA is also named as Kakul gate owing to its proximity with the village. It is a village historically owned by Jadoon Tribe of Pashtuns and the full name of kakul village according to which it is signed under Abbottabad Authorities is Kakul Mansoor Jadoon

== Demography ==
According to the 2017 census, the population of the village is 8,237 - of which 4,156 were males and 4,081 females. The average household size was recorded 5.95.

== History ==
Kakul was a rural area prior to the establishment of a Boer Prisoner of War camp during the Boer War, circa 1899–1902, by the (then) Government of British India. This site was placed under the official management of the 5th Royal Gurkha Rifles. Later on, the POW camp was converted into an army mountaineering and PT school until 1947–48, and a portion of it also remained the offices of the Royal Indian Army Service Corps (RIASC). It was this site, which was later chosen for the new post-independence Pakistan Military Academy, which is located in the eastern side of the valley.

== See also ==
- Killing of Osama bin Laden
