= Namli Mera Union Council =

Town in Pakistan

Namli Mera
- Union council
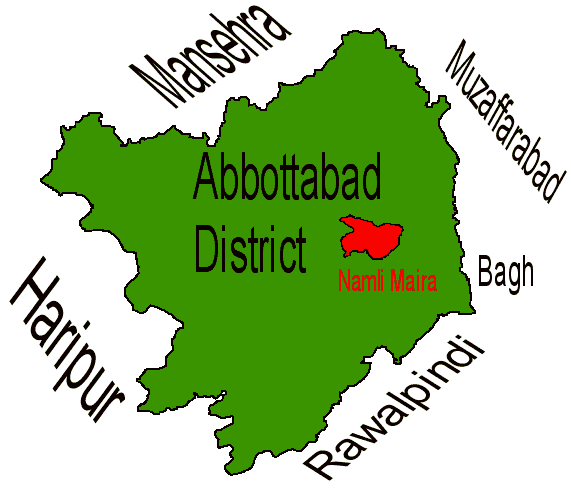
- Location of Namli Mera (highlighted in red) within Abbottabad district, the names of the neighbouring districts to Abbottabad are also shown
- Coordinates: 34°07′N 73°23′E
- Country: Pakistan
- Province: Khyber Pakhtunkhwa
- District: Abbottabad
- Tehsil: Abbottabad

Government
  - District Counselor: Malik Khan
  - Tehsil Counselor: Dildar Awan Sheela PTI
  - Chairmen Village Councils 2022 - 2026: VC-1 Sardar Umer Khitab (2022-2026) VC-2 Sardar Muhammad Hafeez Niazi (2022-2026)

Population (2017 Census of Pakistan)
  - Total: 17,851

Namli Mera is a residential town and a mountainous rural area located in Abbottabad District, Khyber Pakhtunkhwa province, Pakistan.

It is one of the 51 union councils of Abbottabad District, and takes its name from the two largest hamlets in the Union Council, Namli and Mera. Its capital is New kalwan city . These settlements are nestled on mountain ridges about 20 kilometres from the city of Abbottabad, in the foothills of Miranjani, the highest peak having height of 2,992 metres (9,816 ft), in Abbottabad district. A metalled road connects Namli Mera to the main Abbottabad—Nathia Gali road and is an alternate route to reach Nathia Gali from Abbottabad. Namli Mera is around 3 kilometres away Bagnotar on the main road.

== Climate and crops ==
Being at a high altitude, this region hosts extreme winters (starting October) and a temperate and slightly humid summer (April onwards) which temperatures reaching 30C. July and August also see the monsoon which cause a pleasant drop in temperature.

Farming is the main occupation of the population. The farming is done by oxen in remote areas but in villages with better accessibility the land is ploughed by machinery. The two crops grown there are rabi and Kharif crop. The major rabi crops grown in the area are potato and maize, and the kharif crop is only wheat, in a very small area of village. The wheat is used for cattle and for grain only. Some vegetables are also found here, including turnip, radish, peas, pumpkin, beans and mustard.

Fruits like pear, apple, black grapes, grapes, fig, peach, damson plum, mulberry, wild fig, lemon, apricot, cherry are found in abundance in Namli Mera. As the hill people lack awareness of the markets, they are unable to get a proper return. These fruits are therefore used for subsistence.

Most of the area around these mountain villages is covered with trees. Peaks are covered with evergreen trees including pine, walnut, oak and maple trees. Herbs, shrubs, wild flowers and thorny bushes can be seen in abundance. Goats and other pet animals graze the pastures.

== Livelihood and economy ==
The main occupation of the people is subsistence farming and cattle breeding. Farmers cultivate one crop per season as climatic conditions do not permit double cropping. The other occupation is cattle breeding. Cows, sheep and goats are kept to supply milk for daily use of the household. Bullocks are used to work the plough. Poverty has forced many people to seek economic opportunities in the plains. Besides earning livelihood doing jobs in nearby towns, many have joined the army and civil service. Hotels in the nearby hill towns of Nathia Gali, Ayubia and Murree provide another source of employment to the locals. After turmoil in Swat, Namli Mera is gradually becoming popular with tourists from down country.

Wood is the primary source of fuel and home construction, as there is no gas in Namli Mera. People go to forests and cut trees so that they can light fires for cooking and other activities. Those who can afford them use LPG gas cylinders.

== People ==
The population of Namli Mera is Muslim, belonging to the Sunni sect. About 90% belong to the Karlal (Sardar) tribe. Other tribes in this area include Turks, Awan, Abbasi and a handful of Mughals.

The mother language of the people of Namli Mera is Pahari پہاڑی, which is slightly different from Pothwari. Locals also speak and understand Hindko, Urdu, Pashto and English. The elderly people of the area can also speak and understand Persian and Arabic.

== Education ==
Namli Mera village has one of the highest literacy rates for the district. The literacy rate of Namli Mera is about 92%. But some says its 99.99%. Government and private schools cater to the elementary educational needs of the residents. There are Primary schools for boys and girls, Government Boys High School and Girls High School. A number of private schools are also available. Habib Public School, Abaseen Public School, Model Public School are the oldest and famous school of the village. Al-falah Public School in Chanati and Iqra Public School in Upper Mera Kalan are the other private schools.

== Tourism ==
Since the earthquake of 2005 tourists prefer Nathi Gali and surrounding areas like Namli Mera, Kala Bagh, Thandiani and Mushkpuri. The approach to Namli Mera is the same from Murree and Abbottabad (32 km from either side). Miranjani (also known as "Choki") is one of the most popular sites of Namli Mera. Mirajani stands approximately 9,000 feet above sea level. There is an old track adjacent to Mirajani which connects Nathia Gali to Thandiani. Along the track lies a British-era forest rest house, called Dagri Bangla by the locals. The location of the building, in the middle of thick forest, colonial style of construction and remoteness give it an aura of mystery.

== 2005 earthquake ==
On 8 October 2005, an earthquake of magnitude 7.6 struck the northern areas and Kashmir, causing significant damage to housing and a large number of deaths. Aftershocks were felt through December. As some houses were damaged in the earthquake, the Pakistani army donated money and funds for the people.
