= Sir Bhanna Union Council =

Town in Pakistan

Sir Bhanna
- Union Council
- Country: Pakistan
- Province: Khyber Pakhtunkhwa
- District: Abbottabad
- Tehsil: Abbottabad

Population (2017 Census of Pakistan)
  - Total: 16,228

Sir Bhanna also spelled as Sarbhana is a residential town and a union council of Abbottabad District in Khyber-Pakhtunkhwa province of Pakistan. According to the 2017 Census of Pakistan, the population was 16,228 and according to the 2023 census the population was 17,305 of which 8,727 were males and 8,578 females.

== Subdivisions ==
- Aziz Mang
- Desal, Pakistan
- Khan, Pakistan
- Mohar Khurd
- Sadra, Pakistan
- Seegah
- Sir Bhanna
