= Majhot =

- Location within Pakistan
- Coordinates: 34.197492°N 73.451767°E
- Country: Pakistan
- Province: Khyber-Pakhtunkhwa
- Elevation: 1,334 m (4,377 ft)

Population (2017)
  - Estimate: Approx. 5,000
- Time zone: UTC+5 (PST)
- Post & updated by Waqar Khobar

Majhot, or Majot is a village in the Khyber Pakhtunkhwa province of Pakistan. It is located in the mountains within the union council of Nammal in Abbottabad District. There are several different tribes living in Majhot: awan, khokhar, Begwal Awan, chanyal Awan, Abbasi, and tharkan tribes.

This village is situated in between two canals (Bribagla kas and kutli kas). The Population of Majhot is more than 2500 but the register voter are not more than 1200. The mother tongue of the people of Majhot is Hindko(Pothohari) but they can also speak and understand Urdu and some of them English as well. This area also play very important role in every election and is known as "Mili Larkana".

Majhot despite having big role in regional politics still facing domestic problems, lack of basic needs. There are no Hospital, No Girls School in Area, No Middle School, no high school, for All these People of Majhot have to go to Nammal . People have to send their daughters to Male dominate School and they can get Education only to 8th Class.

Some people who can afford and settled in Islamabad or Rawalpindi they send their child for higher education.

PTI is in Govt but still not improving the standard of life of poor people.
