= Tar Nawai =

- Union Council, Town
- Location within Khyber Pakhtunkhwa Location within Pakistan
- Coordinates: 34°16′17″N 73°17′47″E
- Country: Pakistan
- Province: Khyber Pakhtunkhwa
- District: Abbottabad
- Tehsil: Abbottabad

Population (2017)
  - Total: 10,723

Tar Nawai is a union council and town of Abbottabad District in Khyber-Pakhtunkhwa province of Pakistan. According to the 2017 Census of Pakistan, the population was 10,723 and in the 2023 census the population was recorded as being 11,464 of which 5,822 were males and 5,642 females.
