= Galiat Union Council =

Galiat
- Union Council
- Country: Pakistan
- Province: Khyber Pakhtunkhwa
- District: Abbottabad
- Tehsil: Abbottabad

Population (2017)
  - Total: 957

Galiat is one of the 51 union councils of Abbottabad District in Khyber-Pakhtunkhwa province of Pakistan. According to the 2017 Census of Pakistan, the population is 957.

== Subdivisions ==
- Ayobia
- Chang Gali
- Donga Gali
- Khera Gali
- Nathia Gali
- Thund Pani
