= Jangi =

Jangi may refer to:

- Jangi (dance), a dance of Azerbaijan
- Vardablur, Aragatsotn, formerly known as Jangi, a town in Armenia
- Cəngi, a village in Azerbaijan

== See also ==
- Janggi, a board game popular in Korea
- Jhangi, a union council in the Khyber-Pakhtunkhwa province of Pakistan
- Jhangvi, a dialect spoken in Punjab, Pakistan
- Jangy Addy, Liberian athlete
