= Bal Dheri Union Council =

Town in Pakistan

Bal Dheri
- Union Council
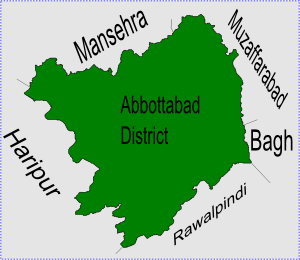
- Bal Dheri is located in Abbottabad District
- Interactive map of Bal Dheri
- Coordinates: 34°15′N 73°12′E
- Country: Pakistan
- Province: Khyber Pakhtunkhwa
- District: Abbottabad
- Tehsil: Abbottabad

Population (2017 Census of Pakistan)
  - Total: 19,065

Bal Dheri is one of the 51 union councils of Abbottabad District in Khyber-Pakhtunkhwa province of Pakistan, the union council of Baldheri is named after the main village of the area. The population of Baldheri Union Council is 14,796.

== Location ==
The village of Baldheri itself is situated at 34°15'0N 73°12'0E which is about 11 km east of Abbottabad city centre on the route towards Mansehra on the main Mansehra Road. Geographically Mansehra lies directly to the north, but the hilly terrain results in these winding roads, hence Baldheri is en route to Mansehra from Abbottabad city.

Baldheri has an average elevation of 1143 metres (3753 feet). The area covered by Baldheri union council, is between Ferozabad village to Tanan Village and Mangal to Halmaira.

== Subdivisions ==
- Bal Dheri
- Jalal Pura
- Mor Kalan
- Gojri
