= Lakhala =

Lakhala Village (لکھالہ)
- Location within Pakistan
- Coordinates: 34.11°N 73.00°E
- Country: Pakistan
- Province: North-West Frontier Province
- District: Abbottabad
- Time zone: UTC+5 (PST)

Lakhala Village (لکھالہ) is a village of Abbottabad District in Khyber Pakhtunkhwa, Pakistan. It is at 34°11′0″N 73°0′0″E in the west of the district. Its Thana (Police Station) is Sherwan, Tehsil Lower Tanawal and district Abbottabad. Lakhala village is property of the Khan. Mr. Khanzada Muhammad Rajwali Khan Tanoli was King of this village. He died on 9th May 1922.
