= Namal Union Council =

Coordinates: 34.0000°N 73.0000°E

Namal نمبل
- Union council
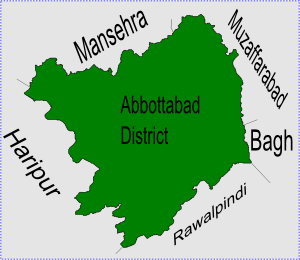
- Namal is located in Abbottabad District
- Interactive map of Namal
- Country: Pakistan
- Province: Khyber Pakhtunkhwa
- District: Abbottabad
- Tehsil: Abbottabad

Government
  - Nazim: Sardar Muhammad Gulzar Abbassi
  - Naib Nazim: Ali ghanzfar Abbassi (Chairman), peevez abbasi

Population (2017)
  - Total: 20,924

Namal is one of the 51 union councils of Abbottabad District in the Khyber Pakhtunkhwa province of Pakistan.

== Location and info ==
Located at latitude 34.22291 and longitude 73.471187, Numbal is a mountainous area in the east of the district bordering Kashmir, where it has trade and tribal links.

The union council takes its name from the main village of the area - i.e. Numbal. U/C Numbal has mountainous peaks, forests, hiking tracks, creek and views of Jhelum River.

== Subdisivions ==
- Majhuhan
- Namal

== Livelihood ==
The main occupation of the people is subsistence farming and cattle breeding. Farmers cultivate two crops per year. The other occupation is cattle breeding. Cows, sheep and goat are kept for supplying milk for the daily use of the households. Bullocks are used to work the plough. Poverty has forced many people to seek economic opportunities in the foreign countries like UAE and KSA.

== Climate and crops ==
As this area is away from sea and is above the sea level its winters are extreme. Winter lasts from November to March. April tends to be quite pleasant as the climate is temperate. The summer season is very pleasant and humid the temperature rises maximum to 30-35 degree, due to which it is good picnic spot. From mid July to mid August people enjoy the fifth season, monsoon, which provides relief after the hot months (i.e. May and June). Farming is the main occupation of the people. The farming is done by oxen in the remote area of village but in proper village i.e. Numbal, Majhuhan is ploughed by machinery because of accessibility.the two crops are grown there i.e. rabi and kharaif. The major rabi crop grown here are potato and maize.the kharaif crop grown there is only wheat. Some vegetable are also found here like turnip, radish, peas, pumpkin, beans and mustard.

== Fruits ==
Fruit like pear, walnuts, apple, banana, black grapes, grapes, fig, peach, damson plum, mulberry, wild fig, lemon, apricot, cherry are found in abundance in U/C Numbal. As the hill people lack awareness about the markets, they are unable to get a proper return. These fruits only meet the requirement of local people.

== Languages ==
The mother language of the people of U/C Numbal is Pothohari. They can also speak and understand Urdu and English.

== See also ==
- Majhot
