= Pind Kargoo Khan Union Council =

Town in Pakistan

Coordinates: 34.0000°N 73.0000°E

Pind Kargoo Khan
- Union council
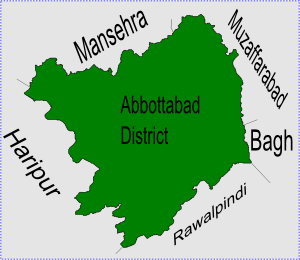
- Pind Kargoo Khan is located in Abbottabad District
- Interactive map of Pind Kargoo Khan
- Country: Pakistan
- Province: Khyber-Pakhtunkhwa
- District: Abbottabad
- Tehsil: Sherwan

Population (2017 Census of Pakistan)
  - Total: 9,375

Pind Kargoo Khan also spelled as Pind Kargo Khan is a residential town and one of the 4 union councils of Tehsil Sherwan, Abbottabad District in Khyber-Pakhtunkhwa province of Pakistan.

The town is located 30 km away from Abbottabad and 7 km away from its capital Sherwan.

The name Pind Kargoo Khan, states the Village, ( Pind ) "in punjabi language", of Kargoo Khan, The far most descendents of Tanoli a Pashtun Tribe.
