= Bandi Dhundan =

- Location within Pakistan
- Coordinates: 34.16°N 73.16°E
- Country: Pakistan
- Province: Khyber-Pakhtunkhwa
- Elevation: 1,469 m (4,820 ft)
- Time zone: UTC+5 (PST)

Bandi Dhundan is a village of Abbottabad District in the Khyber-Pakhtunkhwa province of Pakistan. It is a hilly area, surrounded by green mountains, located at 34°16'0N 73°16'0E with an altitude of 1469 meters (4822 feet). According to the census of 2017, the total population of this village was 27,000. Most of the population is linked with shopkeeping and government jobs. There is a government degree college for girls, boys higher secondary school, boys and girls high schools, and primary schools for both genders. Other than government schools, private schools are also in large numbers, including religious ones. The main agricultural crops in the area include wheat and maize, and the major fruits are apple, apricot, grapes, pear, and plum. Awan cast is in majority, about 70% of the population, including other casts like Tanoli, Rajpoots, Lodhi, and a few more. There are no proper playing grounds for youngsters however these youngsters manage to play cricket and volleyball including a few local games like Gulli danda, baanty, Kharhla, etc.
