= Moolia =

Moolia, also known as Molia, is a village of Abbottabad District in Khyber Pakhtunkhwa province of Pakistan. It is approximately 7 kilometres from the river Jhelum and the Kashmir border lies adjacent to the east side. Moolia is home to a waterfall called Sabri that is a tourist attraction during the summer.

The village is part of Bakot Union Council and is located in the east of Abbottabad District. It is one of the biggest villages of this Union Council, previously it had been a Union Council in its own right before its incorporation into Bakot Union Council

According to the 2023 census, the total population of the village was 7,335 of which 3,589 were male and 3,746 female, the overall literacy was recorded as 76.1% with male literacy being 84.7% and female 68.0%.
