= Nagri Bala Union Council =

Nagri Bala
- Union Council
- Location within Khyber Pakhtunkhwa Location within Pakistan
- Country: Pakistan
- Province: Khyber Pakhtunkhwa
- District: Abbottabad
- Tehsil: Abbottabad

Population (2017)
  - Total: 17,235

Nagri Bala Union Council of Abbottabad District in Khyber-Pakhtunkhwa province of Pakistan. According to the 2017 Census of Pakistan, the population is 17,235.

== Subdivisions ==
The Union Council is subdivided into the following village councils:

- Akhroota
- Nagri Bala 1
- Nagri Bala 2
- Tatreela
