= Jhangi Union Council =

Town in Pakistan

Jhangi
- Union council
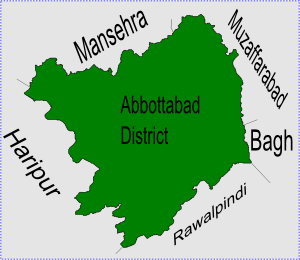
- Jhangi is located in Abbottabad District
- Interactive map of Jhangi
- Coordinates: 34°12′0″N 73°14′0″E
- Country: Pakistan
- Province: Khyber-Pakhtunkhwa
- District: Abbottabad
- Tehsil: Abbottabad

Population (2017 Census of Pakistan)
  - Total: 20,764

Jhangi is a residential town and one of the 51 union councils of Abbottabad District in Khyber-Pakhtunkhwa province of Pakistan. It is located at the base of the Himalayas and is surrounded by the Sarban Hills.

== Subdivisions ==
- Banda Batang
- Banda Faizullah
- Banda Ghazan
- Jhangi
