= Phal Kot Union Council =

Town in Pakistan

- Union council
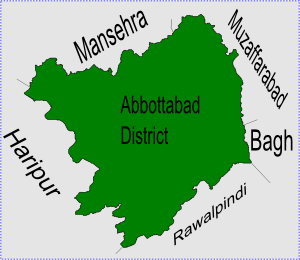
- Phalkot is located in Abbottabad District
- Interactive map of Phal Kot Union Council
- Coordinates: 34°9′40″N 73°22′30″E
- Country: Pakistan
- Province: Khyber-Pakhtunkhwa
- District: Abbottabad
- Tehsil: Abbottabad

Government
  - District Member: Faisal Khan Awan
  - Tehsil Membe: Malik Asif Awan

Population (2017 Census of Pakistan)
  - Total: 10,892

Phalkot also spelled as Phal Kot is a residential town and one of the 51 union councils of Abbottabad District in Khyber-Pakhtunkhwa province of Pakistan.

Its geographical coordinates are 34° 8' 60" North, 73° 22' 45" East.

== Subdivisions ==
- Phalkot
- Kutly
- Malsah
- Sangimera(Bandi)

== Distance from Abbottabad ==
The road distance from Abbottabad to Phalkot is approximately 15.3 miles (24.6 km). Travel Details Travel Time: It takes around 55 minutes to drive this distance due to the mountainous terrain. Primary Route: The most common route is via Murree Road. From Azizabad its on left hand from Murree Road

== Language ==
Hindko/Potohari, language variety of Punjabi language, is widely spoken throughout the area, Urdu being national language of Pakistan also understood and spoken here. English is spoken and understood by some people.

== Climate and crops ==
As this area is away from sea and is above the sea level, its winters are extreme. Winter lasts from October to April. April tends to be quite pleasant as the climate is temperate. The summer season is very pleasant and humid, the temperature rises maximum to 25-30 degree.

From mid-July to mid-August, people enjoy the fifth season, monsoon, which provides some cooling relief after the hot months (i.e., May and June). Farming is the main occupation of the people. The farming is done by oxen in the remote area of village but in proper village is ploughed by machinery because of accessibility. The two crops are grown there: rabi and kharaif. The major rabi crop grown here are potato and maize. The kharif crop grown here is only wheat but in very small area of the village. There are two main purposes of this crop: for cattle and for grain.

Some vegetables are also grown here like turnip, radish, peas, pumpkin, beans and mustard.
