= Salara tribe =

The Salara are a Punjabi tribe, found mainly in Chiniot District of Punjab, Pakistan.
