= Mirpur, Abbottabad =

Union council in Khyber Pakhtunkhwa, Pakistan

Coordinates: 34°12′N 73°15′E

Mir Pur is one of the 51 union councils of Abbottabad District in the Khyber Pakhtunkhwa Province of Pakistan. It is located at an altitude of 1251 metres (4107 feet) and lies in the west of the district. The population of the union council Mirpur was 46,206 in the 2017 census.

Comsats University Islamabad, Abbottabad Campus is located in the Union council Mirpur. The Ayub Medical Complex Teaching Hospital is also situated in this Union Council. The different tribes live here like Jadoons, Sulemankhel (Ghilzai) and Awan etc.
