= Meranjani =

Meranjani is the second highest hill in Abbottabad of Khyber-Pakhtunkhwa province of Pakistan. It is 4,400 meters above the sea level. It can be reached by a track known as Miranjani Track, which starts from Nathiagali Bazar. The track length is about 4 km, and it takes an average person two hours to reach the top.
