= Nambal, Punjab =

Nambal
- Country: Pakistan
- Province: Punjab (Pakistan)
- District: Rawalpindi
- Time zone: UTC+5 (PST)

Nambal is located in the Kallar Syedan Tehsil of Rawalpindi district of Pakistan.

Nambal was part of Tehsil Kahuta until recently when it became part of Kallar Seydan due to Kallar recently becoming Rawalpindi's seventh tehsil. Nambal has a mixture of Ranial Rajputs, Hayal and Bangial Rajputs.

== Demographics ==
The population of Nambal, according to 2017 census was 6,156.

== History ==
The Ranial Rajas of Nambal can trace their ancestry back to the Muslim Janjua Rajpoot's who were a war-like clan and till this day are addressed as Raja.

== The Ranial Rajput family tree ==
The Ranial Rajputs are linked ancestrally to the Janjuas through Raja Malu Khan, who was a descendant of Raja Bhir as illustrated below:

                   Raja Mal Khan, the Janjua king
                                  |
                   Raja Bhir, the elder son of Raja Mal Khan
                                  |
                   Raja Acharpal (later converted to Islam and was renamed Raja Ahmed Khan)
                                  |
                            Raja Sunpal
                                  |
                            Raja Islam-ud-din
                                  |
                            Raja Noor-ud-din
                                  |
                            Raja Daulat Khan
                                  |
                            Raja Hans Khan
                                  |
                            Raja Malu Khan (during Jehangir's reign [1605-28])

Some of Raja Malu Khan's descendants have also spread to Nambal, Chand Tehsil and Malot, Chakwal (the ancestral kingdom of Raja Bhir who inherited it from his father, Raja Mal Khan.)
