= Dhamtour =

Pakistani village

Coordinates: 34°08′7″N 73°16′30″E

Dhamtour is a village in the Abbottabad District of Khyber Pakhtunkhwa province, Pakistan. It lies 10 kilometres (6.2 mi) east of Abbottabad and approximately 50 kilometres (31 mi) north of Islamabad at an average elevation of 1,276 metres (4,186 ft) and serves as the main settlement of the Dahamtore Union Council.

== History ==
In 1848 during the Second Sikh War, James Abbott marched his men through Dhamtour en route to the Dor Valley in a failed attempt to prevent Chatar Singh from heading northwards from Haripur to Mansehra.

In the 1890s Dhamtour, referred to as Dhumtour, was mentioned by British geologist Charles Stewart Middlemiss when he was doing a survey of the area as part of his geological fieldwork in Hazara for the colonial era Geological Survey of India, he described it as one of a "few large villages" that lay along the course of the Dore river.

Dhamtour itself was described by Middlemiss as "a fairly large village, situated on a flat triangle of gravel and clay terraces, and with a steep descent of 200-300 feet down to the Dore river; these recent accumulations being part of the same continuous valley deposits, which, following the bed of the Dore, ascend gradually by the little stream of the Jub to join up with those of the Abbottabad plain."

== Infrastructure ==
Between July 2023 and June 2025 the National Engineering Services Pakistan (NESPAK) completed various important projects both in Pakistan and abroad, one of which was an 18km bypass road that linked the Ayub Bridge in the city of Havelian, Haripur District to Dhamtour. The Havelian-Dhamtour bypass is a route that tourists take to the hilly Galyat areas.
