= Miranjani =

Mountain in Khyber Pakhtunkhwa, Pakistan

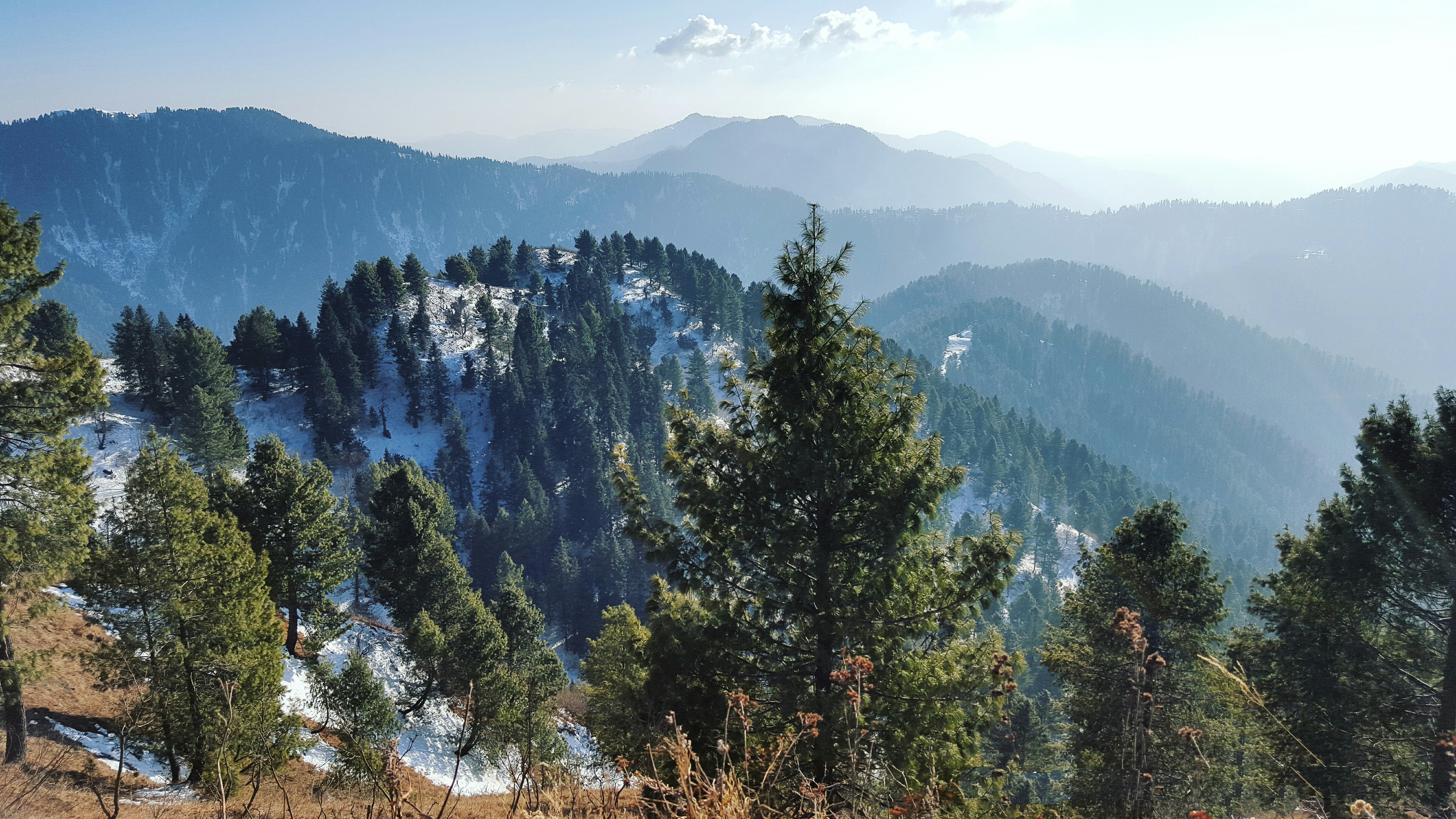
- Miranjani from Namli-Maria

Highest point
- Elevation: 2,992 m (9,816 ft)
- Coordinates: 34°06′30″N 73°24′20″E

Geography
- Location: Abbottabad District, Pakistan
- Parent range: Himalayas

Climbing
- Easiest route: Hiking trails

Miranjani is the highest peak in the Galyat Region, in the Abbottabad District of Khyber Pakhtunkhwa province of Pakistan. It is located at an elevation of 2,992 metres (9,816 ft). It lies within the Namli Mera Union Council, in Ayubia National Park, 80 kilometres (50 mi) north of Islamabad in the western Himalayan range.

It was in Miranjani in 2016 that former Prime Minister of Pakistan Imran Khan announced his intention to launch a protest march against his predecessor Nawaz Sharif.

== Trek ==
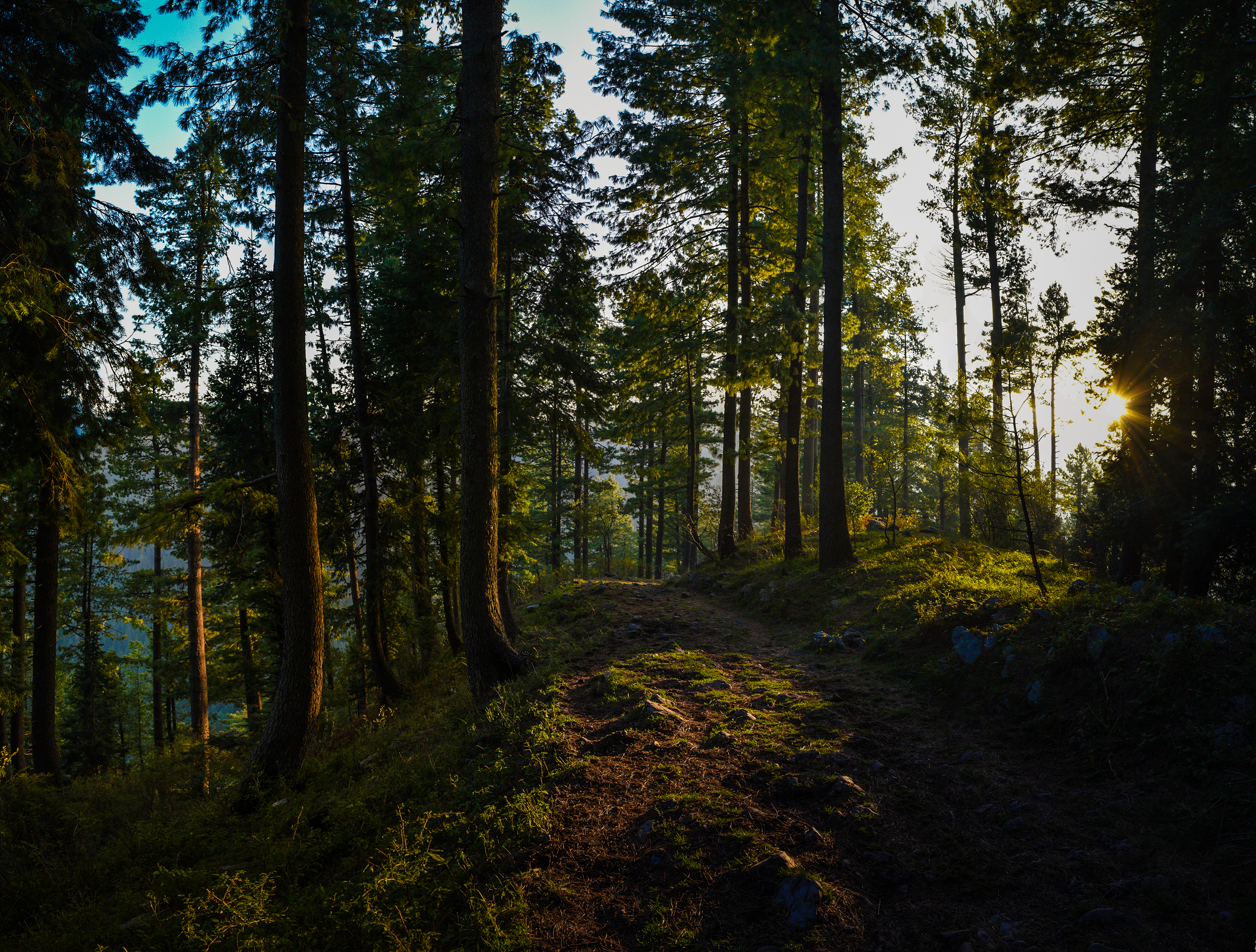
Miranjani trek

The Miranjani Track is a trekking route situated in the Nathia Gali region of Khyber Pakhtunkhwa, Pakistan. It leads to Miranjani Peak, which has an elevation of approximately 2,992 meters (9,816 feet) above sea level. The trail passes through forested terrain and is known for its biodiversity, including various species of flora and fauna native to the area. From the summit, observers can view sections of the surrounding Himalayan range and adjacent valleys. The track is frequently used by hikers and individuals engaged in outdoor recreation.

== See also ==
- Galyat - of Pakistan
- List of mountains in Pakistan
- List of ultras of the Himalayas
