= Sherwan =

Pakistani administrative area

- Union council
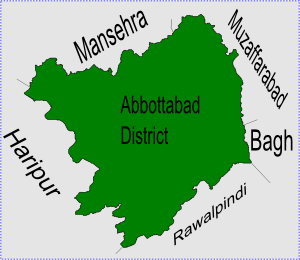
- Sherwan is located in Abbottabad District
- Interactive map of Sherwan
- Country: Pakistan
- Province: Khyber-Pakhtunkhwa
- District: Abbottabad
- Tehsil: Lower Tanawal

Population (2017)
  - Total: 9,614

Sherwan is a town and union council that serves as the headquarters of Lower Tanawal Tehsil in the Abbottabad District of Khyber Pakhtunkhwa, Pakistan. The town is located 15 km west of Abbottabad, the area is composed of two adjacent villages: Sherwan Kalan to the north and Sherwan Khurd to the south. Positioned on a ridge some 4190 feet in the heart of Tanawal Sherwan is surrounded by large, forested mountains on three sides, creating a scenic valley landscape.

These forests are home to diverse wildlife, including jackals, wolves, wild boars, porcupines, foxes, and occasionally leopards. Sherwan Kalan covering a larger area, contrasts with the smaller Sherwan Khurd. To the northeast of Sherwan town lies the village of Batheel, while to the west is the village of Bacha Kalan. The River Mangal flows to the south of the valley, providing habitat for various fish species such as trout, Eels, and soles.

== Demographics ==
The local language is Hindko; the local people also understand and speak Urdu. Sherwan was once part of the Princely State of Amb and located in the Lower Tanawal part of the estwhile state. The main tribe of Sherwan is the Tanoli; other tribes include the Gujjars, the Awans, the Syeds, and the Mughals.

== Subdivisions ==
According to the 2023 census the population was 6,631 of which 3,261 were males and 3,370 females.

Demographic and Area Data from 2023 Census
Village	Total Population	Males	Females	Area (acres)
Bhateel	393	200	193	213
Shaheedabad	1,820	906	914	1,428
Sherwan Kalan	1,323	640	683	1,681
Sherwan Khurd	2,270	1,127	1,143	981
Thorey	825	388	437	356

== History ==
=== Under Turkish rule ===
Tanawal was a part of Pakhli, which was ruled by Turks for centuries. Sherwan was the capital of Lower Tanawal under the Turks. The last Turkish Wali (governor) of the area was Qias-ud-din during the third quarter of 18th century.

=== Under the rule of the Sikhs ===
After doing away with Sardar Muhammad Khan Tarin, Bostan Khan Tarin, and others in lower Hazara, the Sikh administration implemented measures that significantly impacted the local population. The Mashwanis of Srikot were displaced from their ancestral lands and lived as refugees in nearby areas for approximately six to seven years. A number of them eventually crossed the Indus River and resettled in Swabi. During this period, several Mashwani youths were also conscripted into the Sikh military forces. After the death of Maharaja Ranjit Singh, the Sikh Empire experienced internal instability, leading to a gradual decline in its authority and governance.

=== Under British rule ===
Four months after the Second Sikh War began, Chatar Singh declared war on the East India Company, it was at Sherwan that James Abbott rallied the Hazarawals to fight against the rebellious Sikhs. The Mashwani tribe were the first to rally, Abbott described them as a "rugged looking race, ugly and not gracefully built, whose clothing is of cotton cloth, dyed indigo black. But they are among the truest and staunchest defenders of a hillside that the world can boast, and are good shots with their clumsy smooth-bore matchlocks."

In 1849, the Sikhs were finally defeated by the British and the area came under the British jurisdiction in the Hazara district.

The British ruled the region mostly through the local chiefs. Nawab Khan Tanaoli and his allies conquered Sherwan Fort, Sherwan and nearby villages and continued ruling Sherwan.

== Fort of Sherwan ==
Sherwan Fort was built by the Sikhs in 1822 A.D. It was stormed and conquered by Nawab Khan Tanoli. Later, Major James Abbott constructed the interior in a Victorian style. It was auctioned on May 24, 2007. The fort was mentioned by Sir General James Abbott, one of the builders of the British Empire, in his diaries.

== Economy ==
Locals grow seasonal grain crops such as maize and wheat. The area of Sherwan has plenty of water and soil rich with nutrients, allowing producers to grow cherries, plums, apples, pears, and apricots. The mountains of Sherwan are full of minerals like soapstone. The largest soapstone deposits of the country are located near Sherwan in Hazara. A huge deposit of soapstone is found in the mountains of a nearby village. A large number of people are also engaged in soapstone mining. The most extensive steatite deposits in Pakistan are found in the Sherwan area of the Hazara District. Iron ore, lead, and magnesite ore are also found in these mountains.

== See also ==
- Tanoli
- Amb State
