= Lower Tanawal Tehsil =

Pakistani administrative area

Lower Tanawal Tehsil تحصیل لوور تناول
- Tehsil
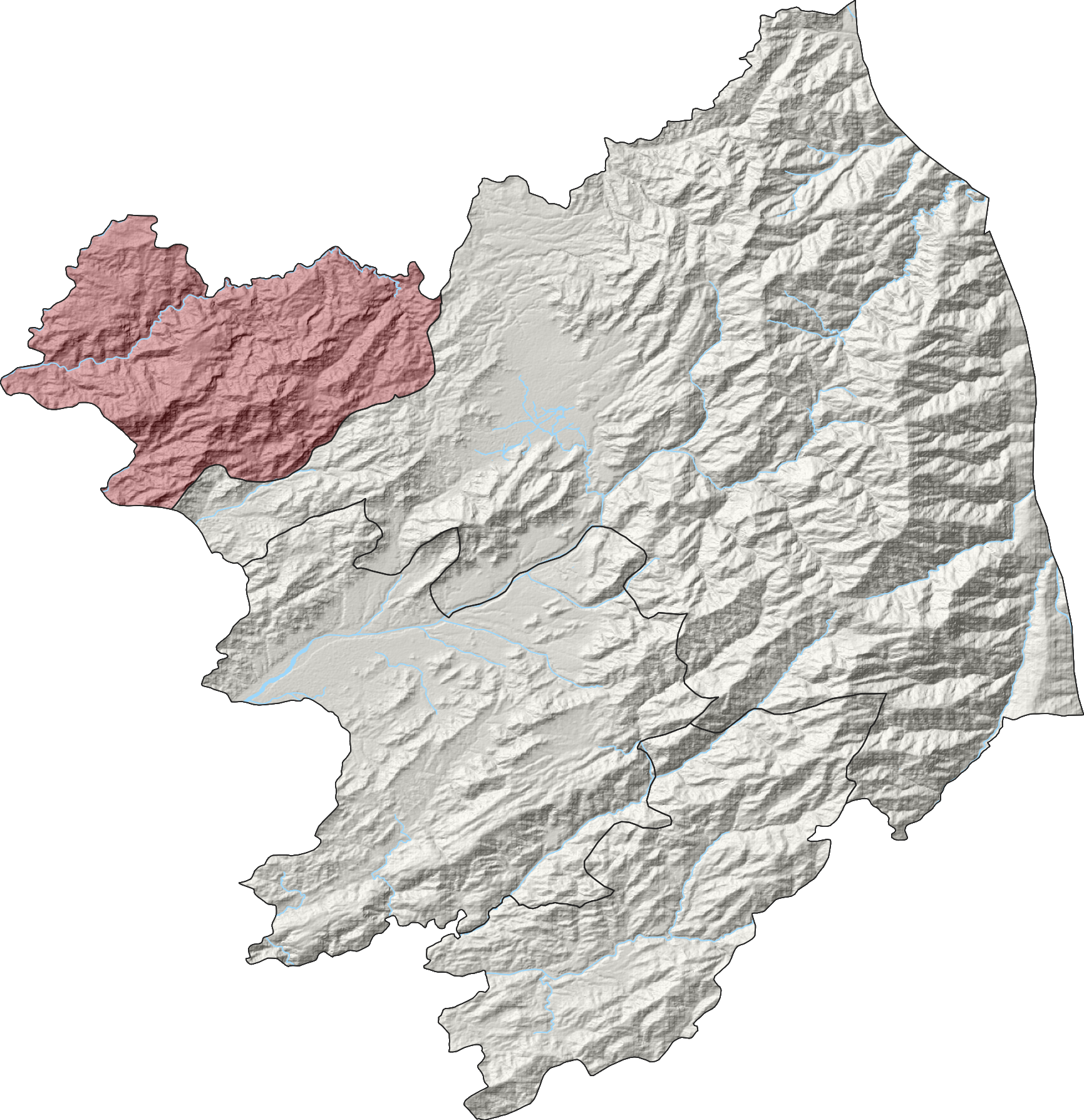
- Country: Pakistan
- Province: Khyber Pakhtunkhwa
- District: Abbottabad
- Headquarters: -

Area
  - Tehsil: 153 km^{2} (59 sq mi)

Population
  - Rural: 60,262
- Time zone: UTC+5 (PST)

Lower Tanawal Tehsil (Urdu: تحصیل لوور تناول) is an administrative subdivision (tehsil) of Abbottabad District in the Khyber Pakhtunkhwa province of Pakistan. It covers an area of 153 km^{2} (59 sq mi).

== History ==
During the British rule, the current district of Abbottabad was created as a Tehsil of Hazara District. After Pakistan′s independence from Britain on 14 August 1947, it remained a tehsil of Hazara until 1981 when the old Abbottabad Tehsil became a district, containing two tehsils - Abbottabad and Havelian. In recent years Lower Tanawal itself has been created as a tehsil in its own right.

== Demography ==
According to the 2023 census the total population of Lower Tanawal Tehsil was 60,262 of which 29,960 were male and 30,300 were female. The census also recorded religious affiliation as follows: 60097 Muslim, 129 Christians, 5 Hindus, 1 Ahmadi Muslim, 1 Sikh and 4 listed as others.

Religious affiliation of residents
Religion	Followers	Percentage
Muslim	60,097	99.77%
Christian	129	0.21%
Hindu	5	0.01%
Ahmadis	1	<0.00%
Sikh	1	<0.00%
Others	4	0.01%

The mother tongue of residents were recorded as follows: 520 Urdu, 12 Punjabi, 1 Sindhi, 177 Pushto, 4 Kashmiri, 26 Saraiki, 59,449 Hindko, 8 Brahvi, 13 Shina, 2 Balti, 1 Mewati, 1 Kohistani and 25 listed as others.

Mother tongue of residents
Language	Speakers	Percentage
Urdu	520	0.86%
Punjabi	12	0.02%
Sindhi	1	0.00%
Pushto	177	0.29%
Kashmiri	4	0.01%
Saraiki	26	0.04%
Hindko	59,449	98.69%
Brahvi	8	0.01%
Shina	13	0.02%
Balti	2	0.00%
Mewati	1	0.00%
Kohistani	1	0.00%
Others	25	0.04%
