= Jadoon =

Pashtun tribe

جدون

Regions with significant populations
- Hazara region: Abbottabad, Haripur, Mansehra

Languages
- Pashto, Hindko

Religion
- Islam

Related ethnic groups
- Pashtuns • Hazarewal

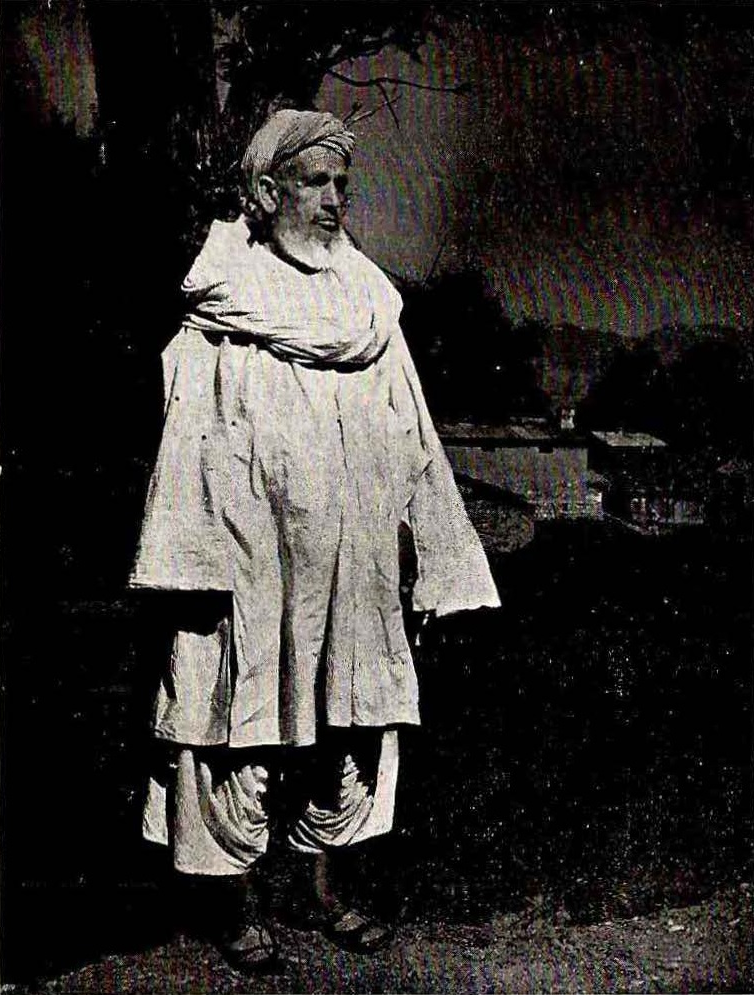
A member of the Jadoon tribe in traditional dress, 1951

The Jadoon, (Note: May also be written as Gadoon on older historical books The original name of the tribe was Zhadoon, but was changed to Gadoon due to the hard dialect of Pashto, and due to grammar habits of the tribes of the Peshawar valley with the tendency to change the letters ژ into ج, the variant Jadoon appeared) also known as Gadoon or Jadun (Pashto: ږدون،ګدون،سدون،زدون; Hindko: جدون) is a Pashtun tribe primarily residing in the Hazara Division as well as in the southern slopes of Mahaban mountains, called the Gadoon area in the Swabi district of the Khyber Pakhtunkhwa province of Pakistan.

== History ==
A small section of the Jadoon tribe – using the ethnonym Gadun – speaks Pashto, but the rest of the tribe in the Hazara region has been assimilated into the Hindkowan Hazarewal community and speaks Hindko. Sir Olaf Caroe, a British Raj-era administrator of the NWFP, counts the Jadoon tribe under the Panni sub-division in the genealogy of the Gharghasht in his book The Pathans. According to the historian Ĭuriĭ Vladimirovich Gankovskiĭ (Yuri V. Gankovskiy), professor of Pakistan Studies at Institute of Oriental Studies in Moscow, the Jadoons were a tribe of Indo-Aryan origin that were assimilated by the Kakar.

== Genetics ==
Y haplogroup and mtdna haplogroup samples were taken from Jadoon, Yusufzai, Sayyid, Gurjar and Tanoli men living in Swabi District, Khyber Pakhtunkhwa in Pakistan. Jadoon men are of predominantly East Asian paternal ancestry with West Eurasian maternal ancestry and a lesser amount of South Asian maternal ancestry according to a Y and mtdna haplogroup test indicating local females were marrying immigrant males during the medieval period. Y Haplogroup O3-M122 makes up the majority of Jadoon men, the same haplogroup carried by the majority (50-60%) of the Han Chinese. 82.5% of Jadoon men carry Q-MEH2 and O3-M122, which are both of East Asian origin. O3-M122 was absent in the Sayyid population and appeared in low numbers among Tanolis, Gurjars and Yusufzais. There appears to be founder effect in the O3-M122 among the Jadoon. 76.32% of Jadoon men carry O3-M122 while 0.75% of Tanolis, 0.81% of Gurjars and 2.82% of Yusufzais carry O3-M122.

56.25% of Jadoons in another test were found to carry West Eurasian maternal Haplogroup H (mtDNA). Dental morphology of the Swabi Jadoons was also analyzed and compared to other groups in the region like Yusufzais and Sayyids.

== People ==
- Amanullah Khan Jadoon, former MPA and Federal Minister
- Iqbal Khan Jadoon, former governor of Khyber Pakhtunkhwa
- Amira Jadoon, professor, Clemson University, United States

== See also ==
- Nimat Allah al-Harawi Author of Tarikh-i-Khan Jahani Makhzan-i-Afghani (The History of the Afghans).
