= Thandiani =

Hill station in Galyat, Pakistan

- Hill station
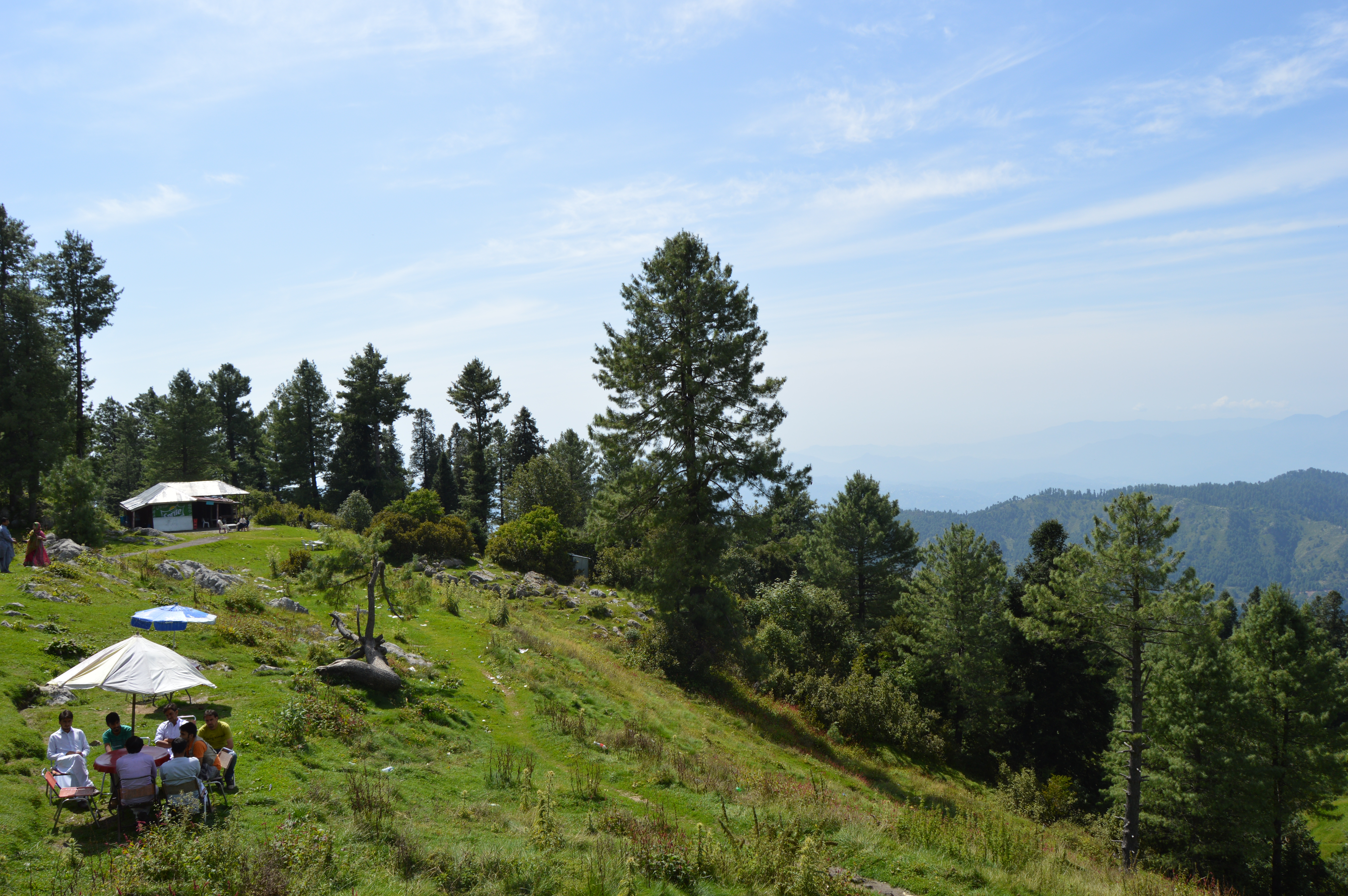
- Thandiani, Galyat

- Location in Khyber Pakhtunkhwa and in Pakistan Thandiani (Pakistan)
- Coordinates: 34°14′N 73°21′E
- Country: Pakistan
- Province: Khyber-Pakhtunkhwa
- District: Abbottabad District
- Time zone: UTC+5 (PST)

Thandiani is a hill station in the Galyat area of the Khyber Pakhtunkhwa province of Pakistan. It is located about 37.5 kilometres (23.3 mi) northeast of Abbottabad District in the foothills of the Himalayas, and about 2,750 metres (9,020 ft) above sea level.

== History ==
Thandiani was originally granted as a lease to some members of the Battye family in British India, who were Christian missionaries and also worked in the British civil service and military. The Battyes subsequently gave the site to the Anglican church, where a sanatorium and various other facilities were set up during British rule. It also contained some private European houses, a camping ground, a small bazaar, and a small seasonal church of Francis Xavier in the Wilderness, which were occupied only during the summer months.

== Geology ==
The area gives its name to the Thandiani Group, a Jurassic-aged stratigraphic unit in northern Pakistan, composed primarily of shallow marine carbonates and representing deposition from the Early Toarcian to Middle Oxfordian stages. The term was introduced after the description provided by Charles Stewart Middlemiss in 1896 of the stratigraphy of Hazara.

== Forests and wildlife ==
The mountains around Thandiani are more thickly forested than most other hill stations in the area, which have undergone more deforestation. The local wildlife includes leopards, monkeys, several kinds of pheasants, and the rarer flying squirrel and pine marten.

== 2005 earthquake ==
Thandiani and villages surrounding this area were damaged by the 2005 Kashmir earthquake. In 2020, local residents had demanded reconstruction of the Thandiani-Muzaffarabad road, citing what they saw as ongoing neglect from the authorities and the fact that the onus for repairs fell on local residents.
