= Nazim (Pakistan) =

Local government official in Pakistan

Nazim is the title in Urdu of the chief elected official of a local government in Pakistan.

== Description ==
A nazim, from the Arabic word for "organizer" or "convenor" (similar to mayor), is the coordinator of cities and towns in Pakistan. Nazim is the title in Urdu of the chief elected official of a local government in Pakistan, such as a district, tehsil, union council, or village council. The "chief nazim," or district nazim, is elected by the nazims of Union Councils, Union Councillors, and Tehsil Nazims, who themselves are elected directly by the votes of the electorate, the district nazim can also be removed by councillors if they feel any wrongdoing has taken place or if they band together and wish to remove the nazim.

=== Deputy ===
A Naib Nazim, or deputy Nazim, is an elected deputy government official. The word "Naib" means assistant or deputy whilst Nazim is similar to a mayor, hence Naib Nazim is similar in function to a deputy mayor.

== See also ==
- Subdivisions of Pakistan
