= Abbottabad Tehsil =

Coordinates: 34.2083°N 73.4831°E

Abbottabad Tehsil تحصیل ایبٹ آباد
- Tehsil
- Country: Pakistan
- Province: Khyber Pakhtunkhwa
- District: Abbottabad
- Headquarters: Abbottabad

Area
  - Tehsil: 1,285 km^{2} (496 sq mi)

Population (2017)
  - Tehsil: 981,590
  - Urban: 244,842
  - Rural: 736,748
- Time zone: UTC+5 (PST)
- Number of towns: 1
- Number of Union Councils: 35

Abbottabad Tehsil (Urdu: تحصیل ایبٹ آباد) is an administrative subdivision (tehsil) of Abbottabad District in the Khyber Pakhtunkhwa province of Pakistan. The tehsil covers an area of 1,285 km^{2} (496 sq mi).

== History ==
During the British rule, the current district of Abbottabad was created as a Tehsil of Hazara District. After Pakistan′s independence from Britain on 14 August 1947, it remained a tehsil of Hazara until 1981 when the old Abbottabad Tehsil became a district, containing two tehsils - Abbottabad and Havelian.

== Demography ==
According to the 2023 census the total population of Abbottabad Tehsil was 727,449 of which 366,447 were male and 360,984 were female. The census also recorded religious affiliation as follows: 977268 Muslim, 4476 Christians, 81 Hindus, 16 Ahmadi Muslims, 31 Sikh, 5 Parsi and 80 listed as others.

Religious affiliation of residents
Religion	Followers	Percentage
Muslim	977,268	99.52%
Christian	4,476	0.46%
Hindu	81	0.01%
Ahmadis	16	<0.01%
Sikh	31	<0.01%
Parsi	5	<0.01%
Others	80	0.01%

The mother tongue of residents were recorded as follows: 42,734 Urdu, 10,401 Punjabi, 730 Sindhi, 81,731 Pushto, 269 Balochi, 1,080 Kashmiri, 1,722 Saraiki, 1,221,957 Hindko, 521 Brahvi, 1,971 Shina, 160 Balti, 14 Mewati, 8 Kalasha, 11,744 Kohistani and 22,545 listed as others.

Mother tongue of residents
Language	Speakers	Percentage
Urdu	42,734	3.06%
Punjabi	10,401	0.74%
Sindhi	730	0.05%
Pushto	81,731	5.85%
Balochi	269	0.02%
Kashmiri	1,080	0.08%
Saraiki	1,722	0.12%
Hindko	1,221,957	87.44%
Brahvi	521	0.04%
Shina	1,971	0.14%
Balti	160	0.01%
Mewati	14	0.00%
Kalasha	8	0.00%
Kohistani	11,744	0.84%
Others	22,545	1.61%

== Subdivisions ==
=== Municipal Committees ===
- Abbottabad (Headquarters)

=== Cantonments ===
- Abbottabad Cantonment
- Murree Gallies Cantonment

=== Town Councils ===
- Nawan Shehr

=== Union Councils ===
- Bagan
- Bagh
- Bagnotar
- Bakot
- Bal Dheri
- Banda Qazi
- Bandi Dhundan
- Biran Gali
- Birot Kalan
- Birot Khurd
- Boi
- Chamhad
- Chatri
- Dahamtore
- Galiat
- Gojri Union Council
- Dalola
- Jarral
- Jhangi
- Kakol
- Kakot
- Kassaki Kalan
- Kokmang
- Kothiala
- Lakhala
- Malach
- Moolia
- Mir Pur
- Nagaki
- Nagri Bala
- Namal
- Namli Mera
- Nawan Shehr Janubi
- Nawan Shehr Shumali
- Palak
- Pattan Kalan
- Pawa
- Phal Kot
- Pind Kargoo Khan
- Qasba Abbatabad
- Rach Behn
- Rialah
- Salhad
- Seri Shehr Shah
- Sheikhul Bandi
- Sherwan
- Sir Bhanna
- Tar Nawai
