= Abbottabad District =

District in Khyber Pakhtunkhwa, Pakistan

Abbottabad District ضلع ایبٹ آباد ايبټ اباد ولسوالۍ
- District
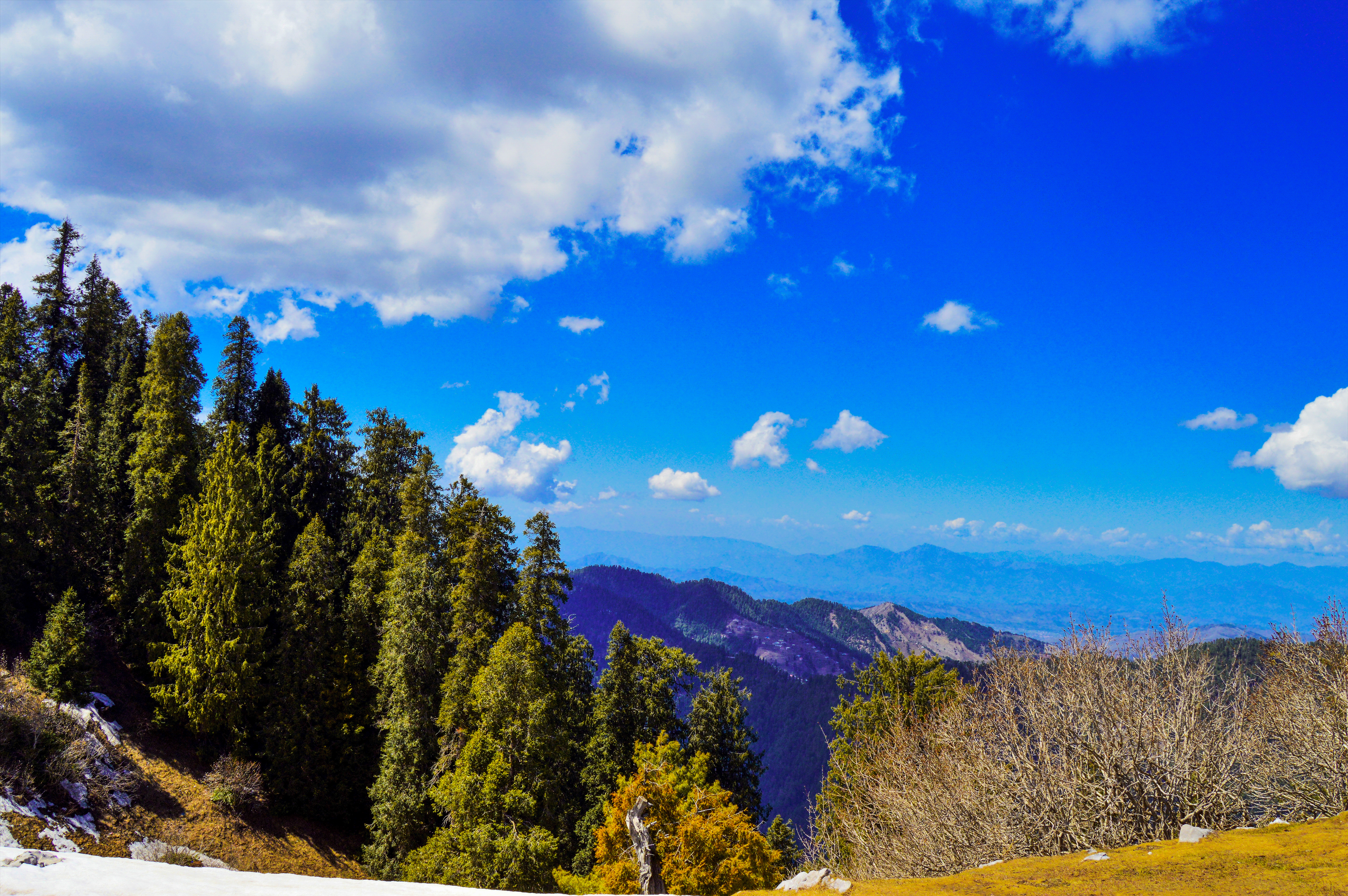
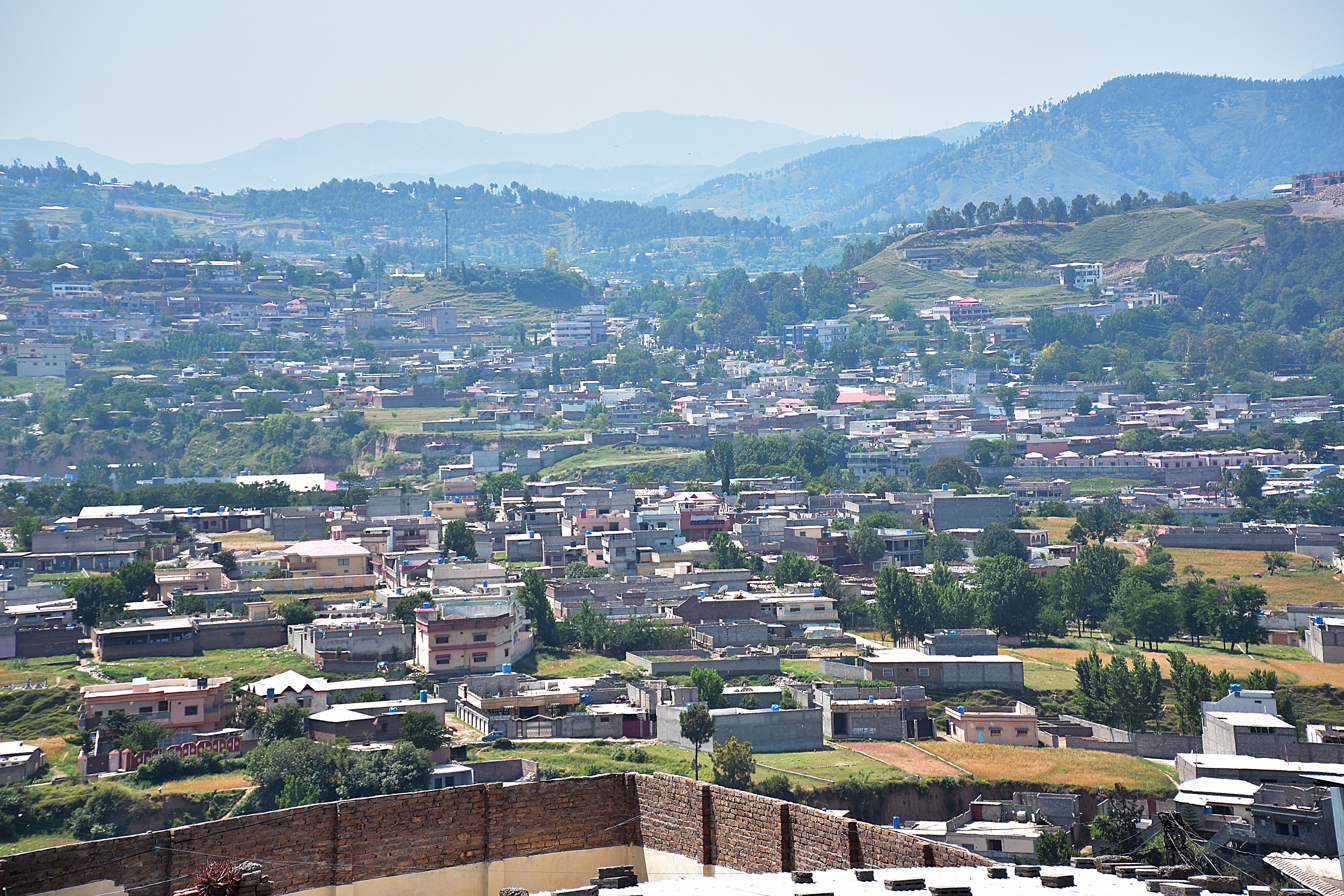
- Top: Thandiani in winter Bottom: View of Abbottabad

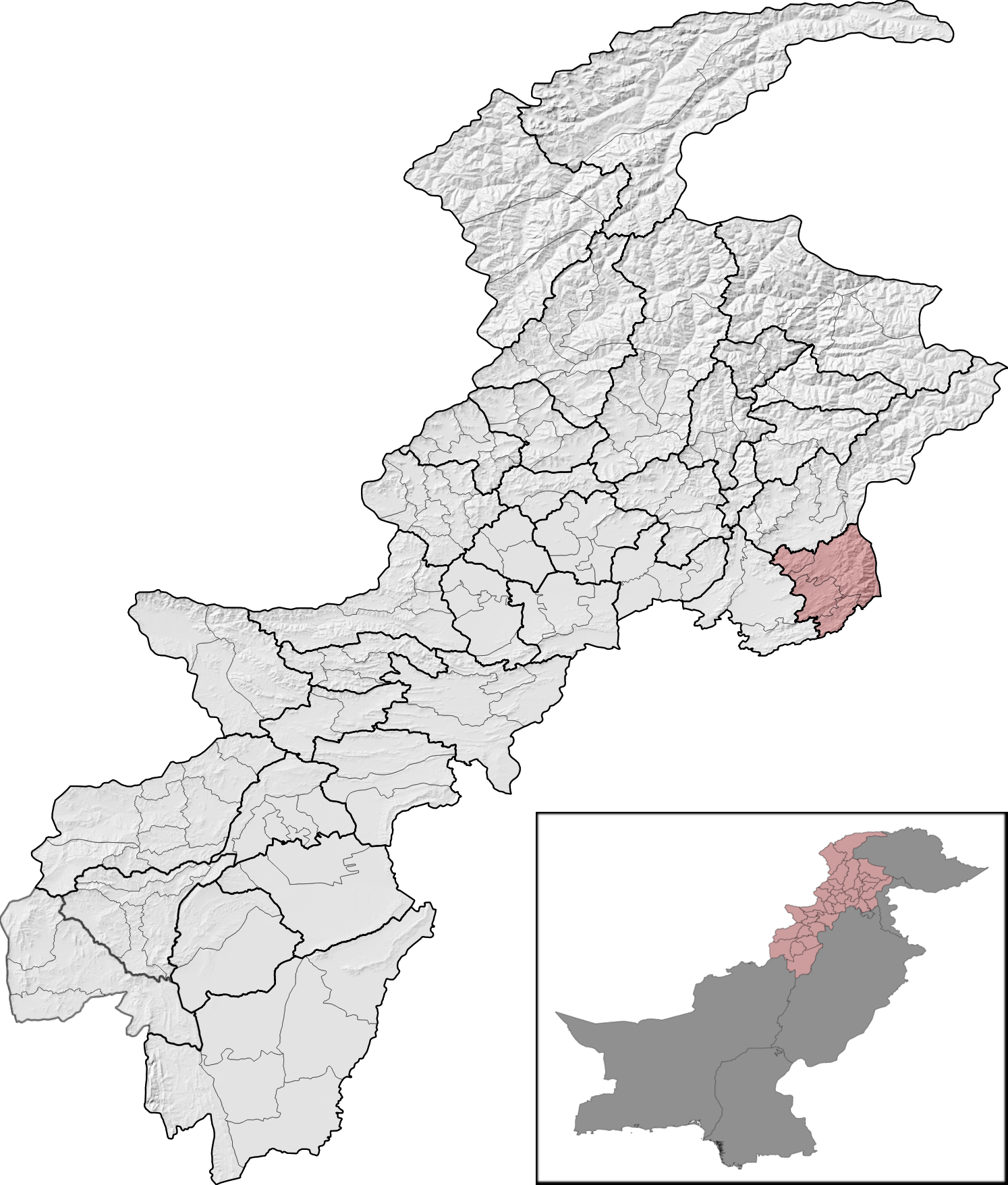
- Abbottabad District (red) in Khyber Pakhtunkhwa
- Coordinates: 34°00′N 73°00′E
- Country: Pakistan
- Province: Khyber Pakhtunkhwa
- Division: Hazara
- Established: October 1, 1976; 50 years ago
- Headquarters: Abbottabad
- Administrative Subdivisions: 04: Abbottabad Tehsil Havelian Tehsil Lora Tehsil Lower Tanawal Tehsil

Government
  - Type: District Administration
  - Deputy Commissioner: Khalid Iqbal
  - Constituencies: NA-16 Abbottabad-I; NA-17 Abbottabad-II

Area
  - District: 1,967 km^{2} (759 sq mi)
- Elevation: 1,363 m (4,472 ft)
- Highest elevation: 2,924 m (9,593 ft)
- Lowest elevation: 554 m (1,818 ft)

Population (2023)
  - District: 1,419,072
  - Density: 721.4/km^{2} (1,869/sq mi)
  - Urban: 332,315 (23.42%)
  - Rural: 1,086,757 (76.58%)
- Demonym: Hazarewal

Literacy
  - Literacy rate: Total: (77.34%); Male: (86.20%); Female: (68.42%)
- Time zone: UTC+05:00 (PKT)
  - Summer (DST): DST is not observed
- ZIP Code: 22020
- NWD (area) code: 0992
- ISO 3166 code: PK-KP
- Website: abbotabad.kp.gov.pk

Abbottabad District (Hindko, Urdu: ضِلع ایبٹ آباد) is a district in the Khyber Pakhtunkhwa province of Pakistan. It is part of the Hazara Division and covers an area of 1,969 square kilometres (760 mi^{2}), with the city of Abbottabad being the principal town. Neighbouring districts include Mansehra to the north and Haripur to the west in Khyber Pakhtunkhwa, Muzaffarabad to the east in Azad Jammu and Kashmir and Rawalpindi to the south in the Punjab province. According to the 2023 Pakistani census, the population of Abbottabad District is 1,397,587.

== History ==
=== Origin of name ===
The district is named after Major James Abbott, the first deputy commissioner of Hazara (1849–1853).

=== Hazara ===
During British rule, Abbottabad became the capital of the Hazara division, which was named after and contained the Hazara valley, a small valley in the outermost Himalayas, between the Indus in the west and Kashmir in the east.

The current Abbottabad District was originally a tehsil of Hazara, the Imperial Gazetteer of India described it as follows:

Tahsīl of Hazāra District, North-West Frontier Province, lying between 33°49' and 34° 22' N. and 72°55' and 73° 31' E., with an area of 715 square miles (1,850 km^{2}). It is bounded on the east by the Jhelum, which divides it from Pūnch and the Punjab District of Rawalpindi; and it comprises part of the mountain valleys drained by the Dor and Harroh rivers, together with the hill country eastward. The hill-sides to the north and north-east are covered with timber forest. The population in 1901 was 194,632, compared with 175,735 in 1891. It contains the towns of ABBOTTABAD (population, 7,764), the tahsil and District headquarters, and NAWASHAHR (4,114); and 359 villages. The land revenue and cesses amounted in 1903-4 to Rs. 97,000.

The area covered by the modern district is described as lying between 33°50' and 34°23' North, 73°35' and 73°31'East.

In 1976, the tehsils of Mansehra and Battagram were separated into the new Mansehra District, while the tehsil of Haripur became a separate district in 1991.

== Administration ==
Map showing the administrative subdivisions of Abbottabad District, the Union Councils of Havelian Tehsil are highlighted in green, whilst those of Abbottabad Tehsil are highlighted in red (the names neighbouring districts to Abbottabad are also shown).

Abbottabad district is divided into four tehsils:

Tehsil	Area (km^{2})	Pop. (2023)	Density (ppl/km^{2}) (2023)	Literacy rate (2023)	Union Councils
Abbottabad Tehsil	1,285	1,003,339	101.76	78.39%	51
Havelian Tehsil	342	256,754	98.8	76.08%	13
Lora Tehsil	187	98,717	97.22	73.73%	
Lower Tanawal Tehsil	153	60,262	98.88	71.66%	

Abbottabad district has one urban administration area – Nawanshehr.

=== Election 1977 ===
During the 1977 elections Iqbal Khan Jadoon, known as the Fakhr-e-Hazara or pride of Hazara, was elected to the district's NA-12 (Abbottabad) constituency.

=== Election 2008 ===
With the announcement by the Election commission of Pakistan that elections would be held on 8 January 2008, more than a dozen candidates filed their nomination papers in Abbottabad.

=== Political campaigns ===
Abbottabad was the centre of the Sooba Hazara movement that started after the national assembly passed the 18th amendment to change the name of the province from North West Frontier Province (NWFP) to Khyber Pakhtunkhwa. The former governor of the province has been vocal in this opposition to the new name

=== Provincial assembly ===
The district is represented in the provincial assembly by four elected MPAs (PK-36 to PK-39):

Member of Provincial Assembly	Party affiliation	Constituency	Year
Nazir Ahmed Abbasi	Pakistan Tehreek-e-Insaf	PK-36 Abbottabad-I	2018
Sardar Aurangzeb	Pakistan Muslim League (N)	PK-37 Abbottabad-II	2018
Qalandar Khan Lodhi	Pakistan Tehreek-e-Insaf	PK-38 Abbottabad-III	2018
Mushtaq Ahmed Ghani	Pakistan Tehreek-e-Insaf	PK-39 Abbottabad-IV	2018

== Demographics ==
As of the 2023 census, Abbottabad district has 236,789 households and a population of 1,419,072. The district has a sex ratio of 100.77 males to 100 females and a literacy rate of 77.34%: 86.20% for males and 68.42% for females. 334,274 (23.92% of the surveyed population) are under 10 years of age. 332,315 (23.42%) live in urban areas.

Historical population
Year	Pop.	±% p.a.
1951	318,775	—
1961	354,452	+1.07%
1972	524,826	+3.63%
1981	647,635	+2.36%
1998	880,666	+1.82%
2017	1,333,089	+2.21%
2023	1,419,072	+1.05%

The population of the district increased from 880,666 in 1998 to 1,419,072 in 2023 which is an increase of 61% over the 25 year period.

=== Major ethnic groups ===
The major ethnic groups in the district are:

- Gujjar
- Awan
- Dhund
- Karlal
- Sarara
- Kashmiris

The Tanawal–Sherwan region is mainly inhabited by the Tanoli tribe, while the Galliyat hill areas are mostly home to the Karlal and Abbassi tribes and the lowland plains are largely settled by the Awan community.

=== Language ===
Languages of Abbottabad district (2023 Pakistani census)
1. Hindko (87.4%)
2. Pashto (5.84%)
3. Urdu (3.05%)
4. Kohistani (0.84%)
5. Punjabi (0.74%)
6. Others (2.07%)

At the time of the 2023 census, 87.43% (1,221,957) of the population spoke Hindko, 5.85% (81,731) Pashto, 3.06% (42,734) Urdu, 11,744 Kohistani, 10,401 Punjabi, 1,971 Shina, 1,722 Saraiki, 1,080 Kashmiri as their first language. Other languages, namely the Kohistani (11,744), are also spoken in this district.

=== Literacy ===
According to the 2023 census Abbottabad was the only district in Khyber Pakhtunkhwa province that had a literacy of 75.1% and above.

=== Religion ===
Religions in Abbottabad district (2023)
Religion	Percent
Islam	99.56%
Christianity	0.42%
Other or not stated	0.02%

Religion in contemporary Abbottabad District
Religious group	1941		2017		2023	
Religious group	Pop.	%	Pop.	%	Pop.	%
Islam	284,228	92.13%	1,329,917	99.76%	1,391,394	99.56%
Hinduism	17,558	5.69%	80	0.01%	114	0.01%
Sikhism	6,035	1.96%	—N/a	—N/a	43	~0%
Christianity	278	0.09%	2,605	0.20%	5,818	0.42%
Other	419	0.13%	487	0.03%	218	0.01%
Total Population	308,518	100%	1,333,089	100%	1,397,587 (Note: Different from official population figure since it excludes sensitive areas where religion was not asked)	100%
Note: 1941 census data is for Abbottabad tehsil of erstwhile Hazara district, which roughly corresponds to contemporary Abbottabad district. District and tehsil borders have changed since 1941.

The major language of the area is Hindko, which in the 1981 census, was the mother tongue of 95% of households. The variety spoken in the city of Abbottabad has formed the basis of a literary language. It is very close to the Hindko varieties of Mansehra: the two share 86% of their basic vocabulary. In the Galliat region in the southeast of the district, the language is still known as Hindko but becomes more distinct and gradually transitions into the dialects of Pahari.

Other languages, such as Pashto, Urdu and Punjabi, are found more in urban than rural areas.

== Parks and protected areas ==
Under the Khyber Pakhtunkhwa Wildlife (Protection, Preservation, Conservation and Management) Act of 1975, two areas have been designated with the district: Ayubia National Park and Qalandarabad game reserve. Both areas cover only 6% of the landed area of the district.

The Ayubia National Park was established in 1984, this park covers an area of over 3,312 ha.

The Qalandarabad game reserve was established in 1980 with an area of 8,940ha.

== Education ==
According to the Alif Ailaan Pakistan District Education Rankings 2015, Abbottabad is ranked 31 out of 148 districts in terms of education. For facilities and infrastructure, the district is ranked 72 out of 148.The literacy rate of Abbottabad is 69%.

== See also ==
- 2005 Kashmir earthquake
