= Circle Bakot =

Cluster of Union Councils in Pakistan

Location of the Circle Bakote region (highlighted in purple) within Abbottabad District.

Circle Bakot (Urdu: سرکل بکوٹ) is a cluster of Union Councils in the eastern part of Abbottabad District in the Khyber Pakhtunkhwa Province of Pakistan. According to the 2017 census the population of Bakot Qanungo Halqa (Circle Bakote) was 195,128 with the number of households being 34,589.

== Etymology ==
“Bakot” is a town and Union Council of eastern Abbottabad.
“Circle” in this context refers to a cluster of Union Councils within Abbottabad District centred around Bakot, "circle" is common in Pakistan to group areas around a chief town, village or area of a city.

The area is also referred to in Urdu as Bakot Qanungo Halqa, Qanungo being derived from the Persian word for record-keeper and Halqa meaning circle - or Bakot Administrative Circle. However Halqa also has the meaning of loop, chain or net so it is not directly equivalent to the English word circle.

== Location ==
Bakot, the chief town of Circle Bakot, is located on the upper and west bank of the Jhelum River at Kohala Bridge. The region is somewhere between 65 kilometres and 90 kilometres northwest of Islamabad. "Bakote" means the "land of forts". The Kunhar River and Jhelum River are the two main rivers in Circle Bakote. Notable hill stations in the area are Miran Jani, Mushkpuri Top, Thandiani, Pather Gali, Ayubia, Khanaspur and Nathia Gali.

== History ==
During the colonial era it was noted by the British administration that "Bakot Thanah" contained the Ilaqas of Bakot and Boi, the Thanah of Bakot therefore seeming to match the territory of Circle Bakot.

In 1893 there was severe flooding in the area as the Jhelum river in July was 36 feet above its mean summer level and which swept away the Kohala bridges and all communication between Hazara and Kashmir was cut off by damages caused by the torrent.

In January 2008 snow and landslides blocked roads in the area.

In 2014 dozen of villages in the area were isolated from the rest of country due to landslides that occurred following prolonged heavy rainfall.

In 2016 villages from throughout Circle Bakote protested over delays in the repairing roads that link the area to Punjab, a representative of the villagers in the region, Haji Nisar Abbasi, criticised both the provincial and district governments.

In February 2018 Circle Bakot was cut off from the rest of Abbottabad District due to heavy snowfall.

In January 2022 most of the local roads were blocked by snowfall for over 10 days.

In April 2024, due heavy rains and landsides the people of Circle Bakot were cut off from Abbottabad the district capital.

In November 2024, the local development authority began infrastructure and snow preparedness projects for the winter.

In January 2025 a press conference organised by the political group Tehreek Huqqub of Circle Bakot made various demands including the construction of Kohala Hoti Road, road from Nathiagali to Thandiani, granting tehsil status to Circle Bakot and a 200-bed hospital. The leaders had threatened closure of the Kohala Bridge if their demands were not met. Also among the demands were the repair of schools damaged in the 2005 earthquake and better connectivity to the district capital Abbottabad - the complainants pointing out it took less time to travel from Peshawar to Abbottabad than for people from within Circle Bakot to travel to Abbottabad.

In April 2025, the forests of Circle Bakot had been burning for five consecutive days and had threatened centuries-old trees, rare bird species and had at one point seemed about to threaten Miran Jani and surrounding areas.

In July 2025, during monsoon flooding, Circle Bakot was one of the areas affected by heavy rains and flooding. Roads which had been affected by landslides were opened towards the end of August.

== Infrastructure ==
Despite the area having abundant water resources there is often a shortage due to water in the region being diverted to Murree and other parts of the Punjab, this dates back to the colonial era when the British authorities first arranged the diversion and collection of water from the region. Sometimes when accidents occur on the roads the injured are taken to Muzaffarabad in Azad Kashmir as there is no hospital in Circle Bakot.
