= Dhaka (disambiguation) =

Dhaka is the capital of Bangladesh.

Dhaka may also refer to:

== Places ==
=== Bangladesh ===
- Dhaka District, a district of Bangladesh
- Dhaka Division, a division of Bangladesh
- Old Dhaka, the historic old city
- New Dhaka, expanded portion of Dhaka
- Greater Dhaka, the megacity of Dhaka and its surroundings
- Dhaka City Corporation, the former municipal corporation of Dhaka
- Dhaka North City Corporation, a municipal corporation of Dhaka
- Dhaka South City Corporation, a municipal corporation of Dhaka
- Dhaka railway station, the main railway station of Dhaka

=== India ===
- Dhaka (Vidhan Sabha constituency) in Bihar
- Dhaka (village), in North Western Delhi
- Dhaka, East Champaran, a town and a notified area in Bihar

=== Pakistan ===
- Ghora Dhaka, a mountain resort town
- Kala Dhaka, another name for Torghar District in Khyber Pakhtunkhwa province
- Sra Dhaka, a village in the Balochistan province

== Other ==
- Dhaka fabric, traditional hand made fabric of Nepal
- Dhaka (film), working title of the 2020 American film Extraction by Sam Hargrave
- Dhaka to Bombay, a 2013 Bangladeshi film starring Shakib Khan

== See also ==
- Dhak (disambiguation)
- Daka (disambiguation)
- Dakar (disambiguation)
- Dakka (disambiguation)
- Dakkah, a kind of external settee attached to a house
