= Aliabad, Abbottabad =

Coordinates: 33°37′N 73°00′E

Aliabad is a village in the Bakot Union Council of Abbottabad District in the Khyber Pakhtunkhwa province of Pakistan. It is located at 34°8'9N 73°27'49E at an altitude of 1313 metres, and it is 108.5 km from Islamabad on Mount Miranjani.

== Etymology ==
The name Aliabad is derived from two words: Ali (The name of Muslim saint Baba Ali Muhammad) and Abad (settlement).

== Infrastructure ==
The village has one government primary school, two masjids and a market.

WWF–Pakistan had completed work in the area that helped prevent landslides affecting roads in the village.

== Demography ==
Around 80% of the population are Gujar and Chauhans.Gakkhar There are also Syeds, Janjuas and Awans in the village

== Neighbourhoods ==
Bariyan and Basali (Centre), Kalaban, Kotli, Sehragran, Danna (Rehman Abad), Kohoey, Baribagla and Balikot/Riyala are the main mohallas of Aliabad.

== See also ==
- Bakot
