= DACA (disambiguation) =

DACA is Deferred Action for Childhood Arrivals, a United States immigration policy that began in 2012.

DACA or Daca may also refer to:

== Organisations ==
- Darwen Aldridge Community Academy, a secondary school in Blackburn with Darwen borough of Lancashire, England, UK
- Dominion Association of Chartered Accountants, former name of the Canadian Institute of Chartered Accountants
- Dumaguete Academy for Culinary Arts, a cooking school in the Philippines

== People ==
- Estevan Daça (c. 1537 – between 1591 and 1596), Spanish composer
- Čika Dača (1878–1967), Serbian footballer
- Ahmet Daca (died 1945), political figure of the Sandžak region of the Balkans

== See also ==
- Daka (disambiguation)
- Dakka (disambiguation)
