= Dakka =

Dakka may refer to:

- Dakka language, an Austronesian language of Sulawesi, Indonesia
- Temple of Dakka, at ad-Dakka in Lower Nubia
- Ghora Dhaka or Ghora Dakka, a resort town in northeast Pakistan
- Abdulkader Dakka (born 1985), a Syrian footballer
- Dakka, a term describing firearms used by Orks in Warhammer 40,000

== See also ==
- Daca (disambiguation)
- Daka (disambiguation)
- Dakar (disambiguation)
- Dhaka (disambiguation)
  - Dhaka, the capital of Bangladesh
- Duqqa, an Egyptian side dish
- Dakkah (Arabic: دكة), a kind of external couch attached to the house
