= Daka =

Daka may refer to:

- Dáka, a village in Hungary
- Daka skull, a Homo erectus specimen from the Daka Member of the Bouri Formation in the Ethiopian Rift Valley
- Daka, a male dakini, a type of god in Tibetan Buddhism

== See also ==
- Dak (disambiguation)
- Daca (disambiguation)
- Dakar (disambiguation)
- Dakka (disambiguation)
- Dhaka (disambiguation)
- Dakin (disambiguation)
- Dacoity, Indian term for banditry
