= Ayubia National Park =

National park in Pakistan

Ayubia National Park ایوبیہ ملی باغ
- IUCN category V (protected landscape/seascape)
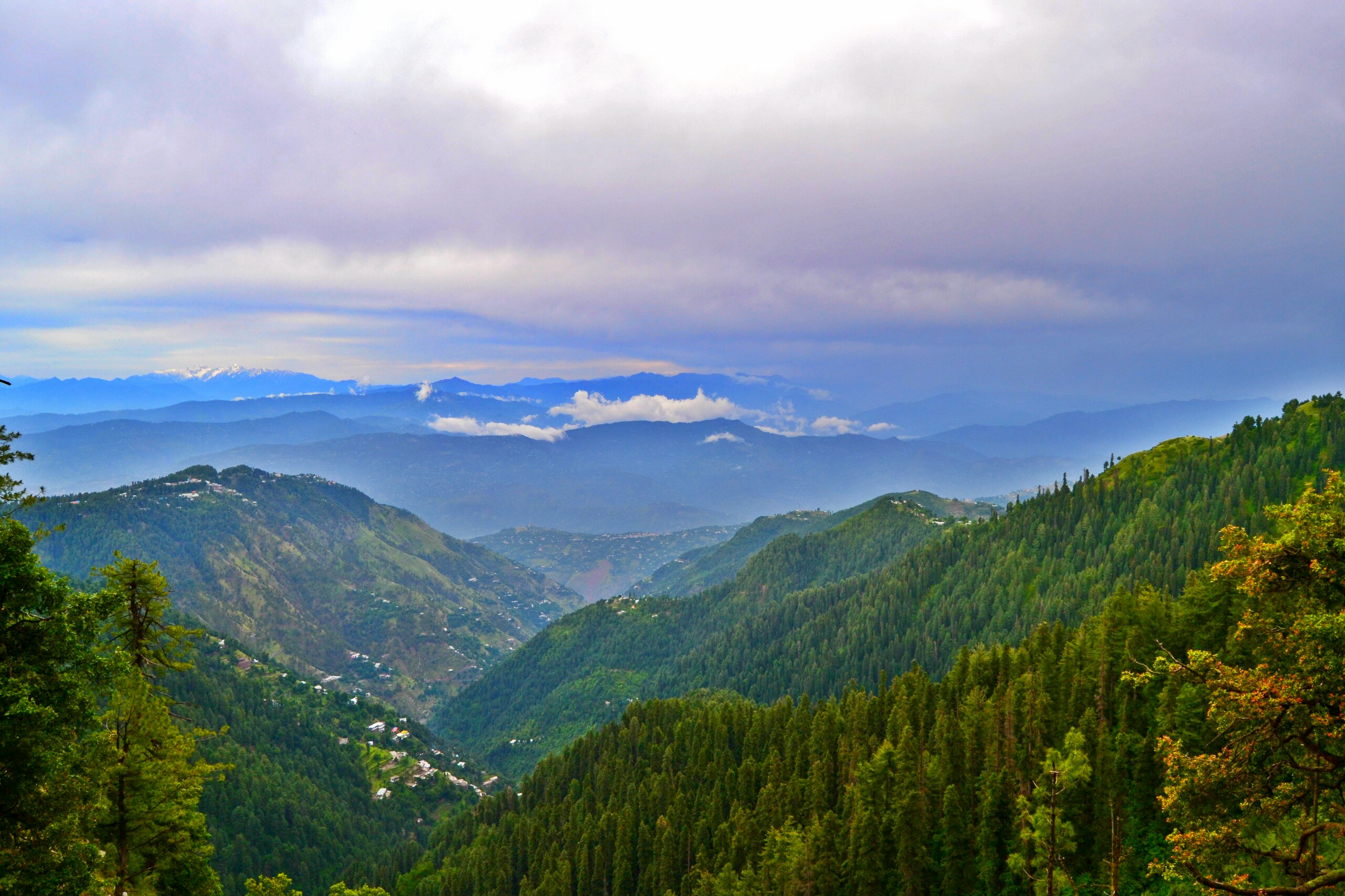
- A view of Ayus pine forests
- Interactive map of Ayubia National Park ایوبیہ ملی باغ
- Location: Abbottabad, Pakistan
- Coordinates: 33°51′54.83″N 73°8′19.57″E
- Area: 33.12 km^{2} (12.79 sq mi)
- Elevation: 2,400 m
- Established: 1984
- Visitors: 250000
- Governing body: Wildlife and Parks Department, Government of Khyber Pakhtunkhwa

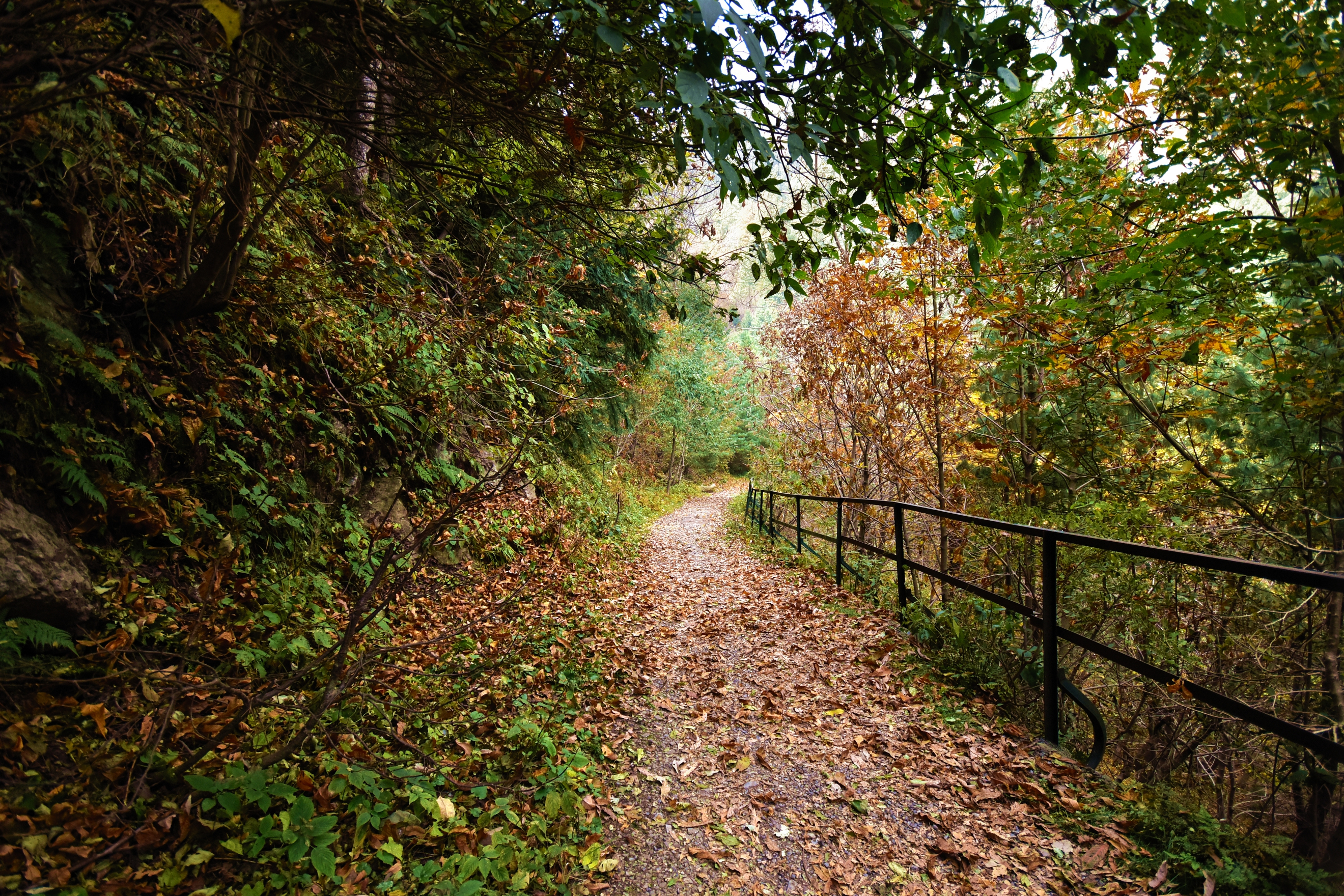
Pipeline Track, Ayubia National Park

Ayubia National Park (Urdu: ایوبیہ ملی باغ), also known as Ayubia (Urdu: ایوبیہ), is a protected area of 3,312 hectares (33 km^{2}) located in Abbottabad District, Khyber Pakhtunkhwa province, Pakistan. It was declared a national park in 1984. Ayubia was named after Muhammad Ayub Khan (1958–1969), second President of Pakistan. The area supports temperate coniferous forest and temperate broadleaf and mixed forest ecoregion habitats, with an average elevation of 2,400 metres (8,000 ft) above sea level. Ayubia National Park is surrounded by seven major villages and three small towns of Thandiani, Nathiagali and Khanspur. The park has been developed as a resort complex from a combination of four mini resorts of Khaira Gali, Changla Gali, Khanspur and Ghora Dhaka in Galyat. Currently, it is managed by the Wildlife and Parks Department of Government of Khyber Pakhtunkhwa.

== History ==
Ayubia National Park was established in 1984 in an east corner of Khyber Pakhtunkhwa province of Pakistan. In 1998 it was expanded from its original size of 1,684 hectares (4,161 acres) or 16.84 km^{2} (6.50 sq mi) to 3,312 hectares (8,184 acres). Since then it has been managed by the Khyber Pakhtunkhwa Wildlife Department. The purpose of establishing it was to conserve the temperate forests. Originally, the park stood at an area of 3.47 square kilometres (857 acres), but in 1998 it was expanded to cover an area of 6.82 square kilometres (1,685 acres).

The total population of Ayubia and surrounding villages as per a 1996 census is 18,097 people living in 2,311 households.

== Climate ==
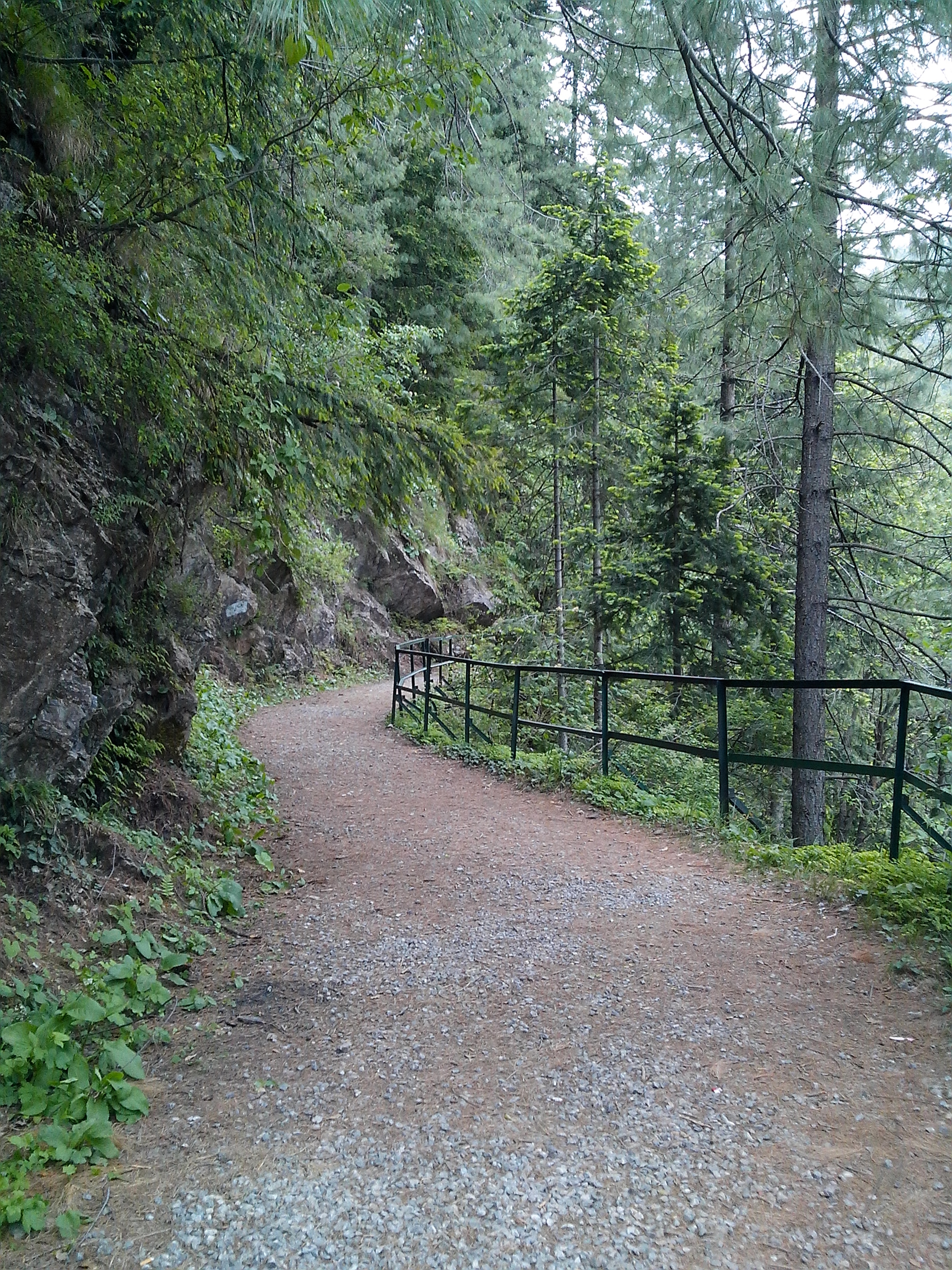
Pipeline Track, Ayubia National Park

The climate of the park is cool in the summers, but harsh in the winters. While it remains only placidly hot in May and June, the cold sets in when the monsoons come to lash in late July and early August. In the winters cold increases in severity gradually until the west winds bring rains, which eventually turn into snow. The park remains snow-capped through the later part of winters.

- Rainfall: 1,644 mm
- Temperature: 3 °C - 11 °C

== Wildlife ==
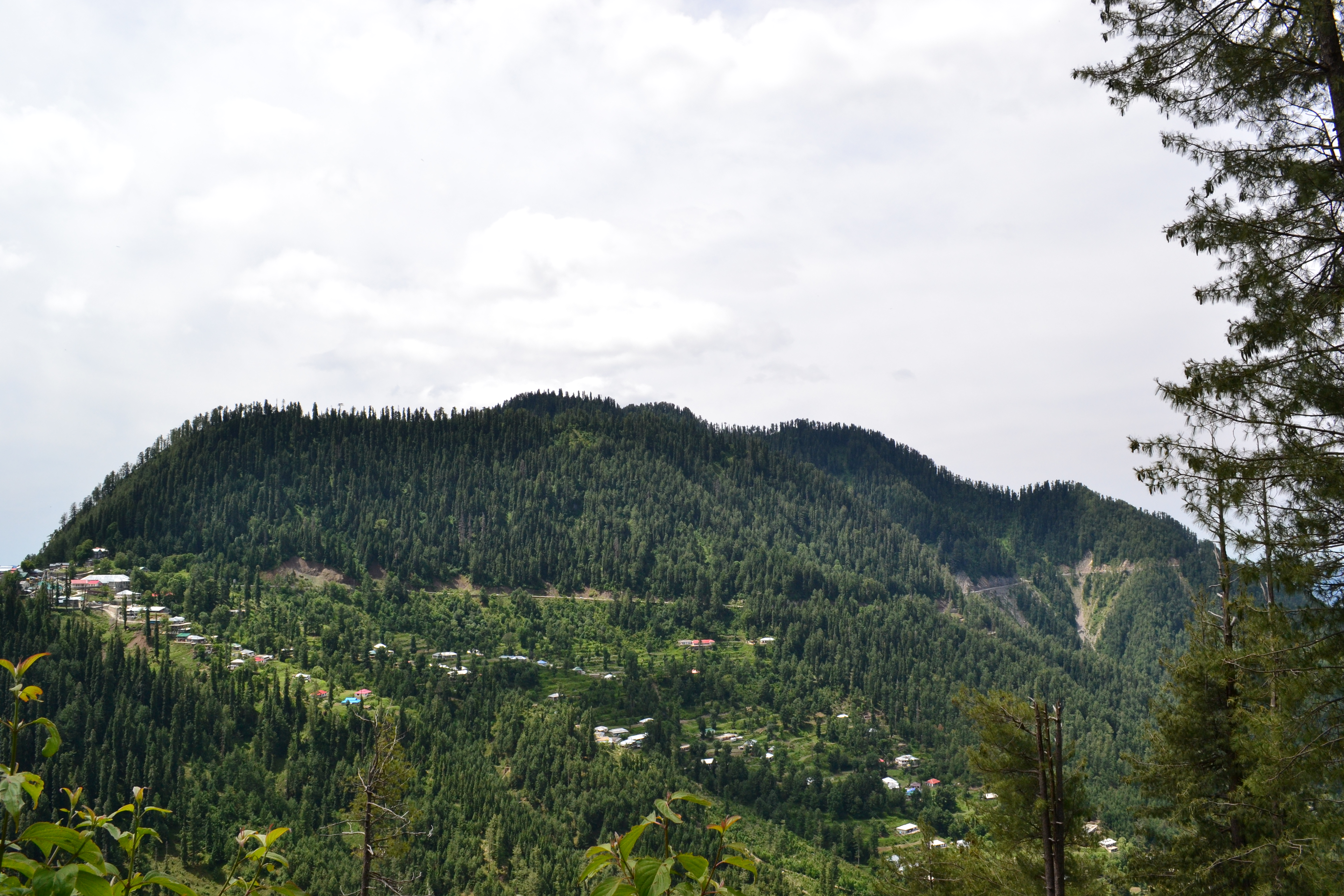
A panoramic view of Tilla Donga

The park holds 104 species of plants. The main floral species are Cedrus deodara, blue pine, yew, silver fir, horse chestnut and oak. Around 21 plants belonging to 19 families are known for their medicinal properties. Many of these are used in treatment of jaundice, stomach ulcers, snake bites, internal infections, diabetes, psoriasis and more. Some plants are said to have anti-carcinogenic effect as well. Also, some are used as biological insecticides and pesticides, mostly due to their insect-repellent nature. The World Wide Fund for Nature has launched an ethno-botanical initiative here "to demonstrate the sustainable use of plant resources as a means for protecting biodiversity. There are 23 mammals, 203 birds and 13 herpto-fauna in the park. Mammals found in the park include:

- Indian leopard,P.p.millardi
- Leopard cat,F.b.himalayana
- Golden jackal,C.a.indicus
- Red fox,V.v.griffithi
- Yellow-throated marten,M.f.flaviugula
- Masked palm civet,P.l.himalayana
- Asian palm civet,P.h.isabellinus
- Central Asian boar,S.scrofa.davidi
- Java pipistrelle,P.j.himalayensis
- Big-eared horseshoe bat,R.macrotis
- Serotine bat,E.serotinus
- Rhesus macaque,M.m.villosa
- Indian porcupine,H.i.blandfordi
- Kashmir field mouse,Apodemus rusiges
- Ward's field mouse,Apodemus wardi
- Turkestan rat,R.turkestanicus
- Murree vole,H.wyneii
- Kashmir flying squirrel,E.fimbriatus
- Red giant flying squirrel,P.p.albiventer

Some of the Himalayan specialty birds of Ayubia include:

- Kalij pheasant,L.l.hamiltonii
- Koklass pheasant,P.m.biddulphi
- Wedge-tailed green pigeon,T.sphenurus
- Speckled wood pigeon,Columba hodgsonii
- Spotted dove,S.chinensis
- Great barbet,M.virens
- Himalayan cuckoo,C.saturatus
- Crested serpent-eagle,S.cheela
- Besra,A.virgatus
- Golden eagle,A.c.daphanea
- Himalayan black-lored tit,M.xanthogenys
- White-cheeked bushtit,A.leucogenys
- Kashmir nuthatch,Sitta cashmirensis

== Management ==
The park has been managed by Khyber Pakhtunkhwa Wildlife Department under the 1975 Khyber Pakhtunkhwa Wildlife Act. The headquarters of the park is at Dunga Gali, which is situated at a distance of 50 km from Abbottabad and 25 km from Murree.

== Tourism ==
Standing at some 26 kilometres from the tourist hotbed of Murree Hill Station, over 100,000 tourists flock to Ayubia National Park and the places around it every year. It is well known for its picnic spots.

This National Park also features the "Pipeline Walking Track" that runs from Ayubia to Nathiagali and is 4 kilometres in length.

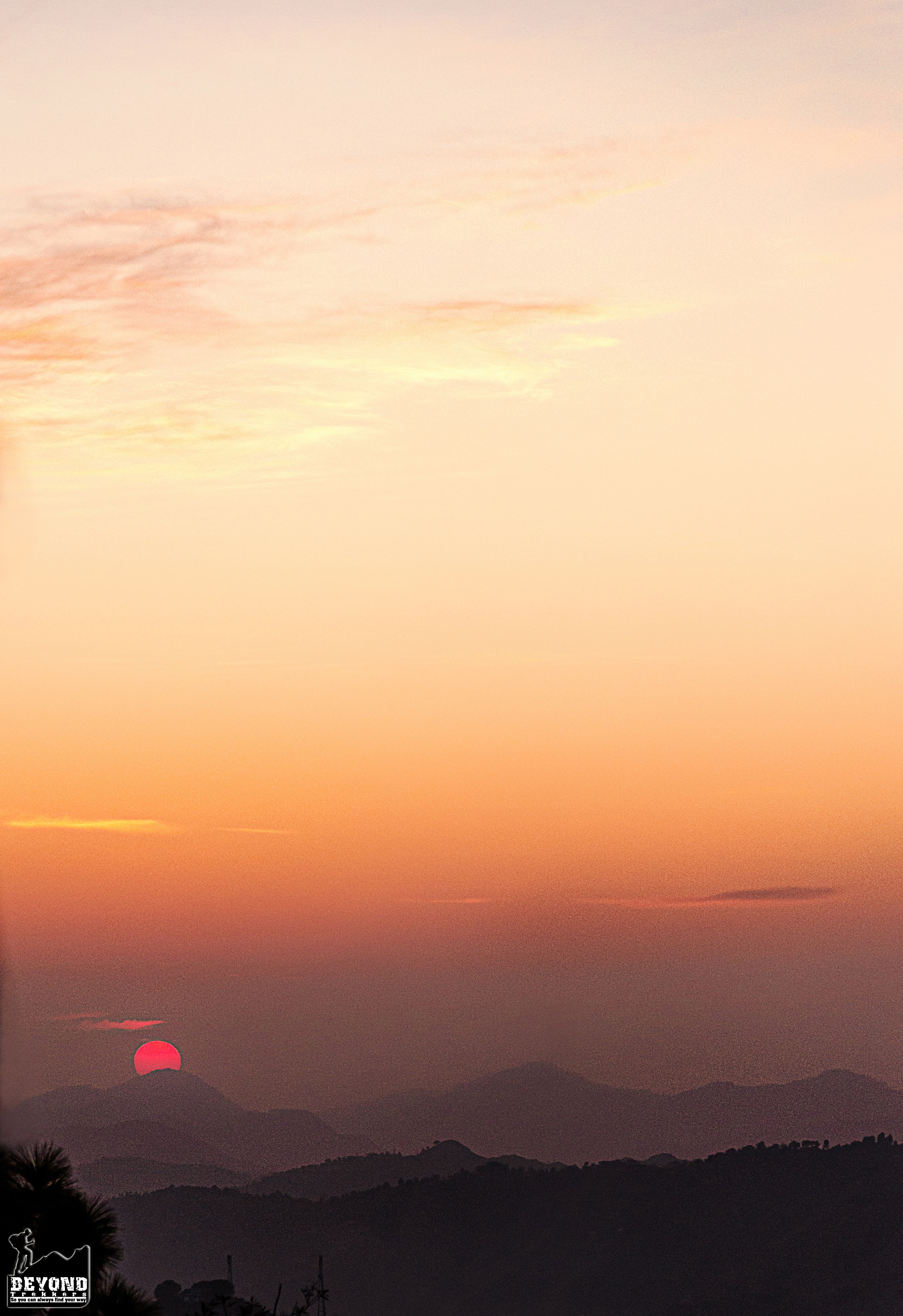
Beautiful Sunset at Ayubia - Khyber Pakhtunkhwa - Pakistan

Since there are 7 villages and 4 major towns around it, and since this area attracts a very large number of tourists annually, there is a large number of hotels and restaurants around the park. In addition to riding trails, hiking places, picnic spots and motels, there is a chairlift in Ayubia that takes the tourists to a nearby summit called Mukeshpuri
مکش پوری for a view of the forested hills. This chairlift was the first recreation facility of its kind in Pakistan and is still a major attraction for domestic tourists. The famous PTDC motel is located here.

== Gallery ==
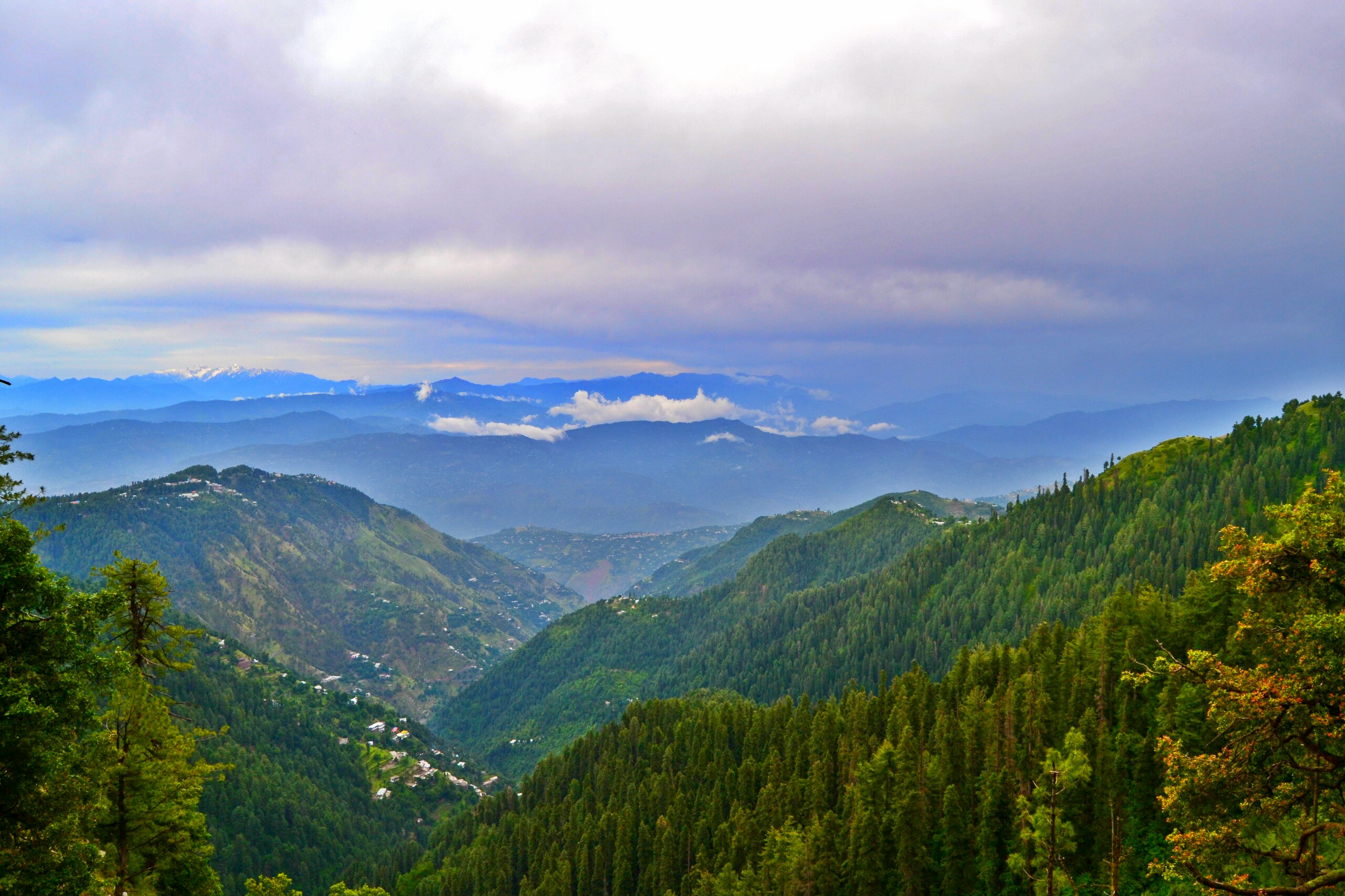
Glaciers, Mountains, Valleys & Hills.

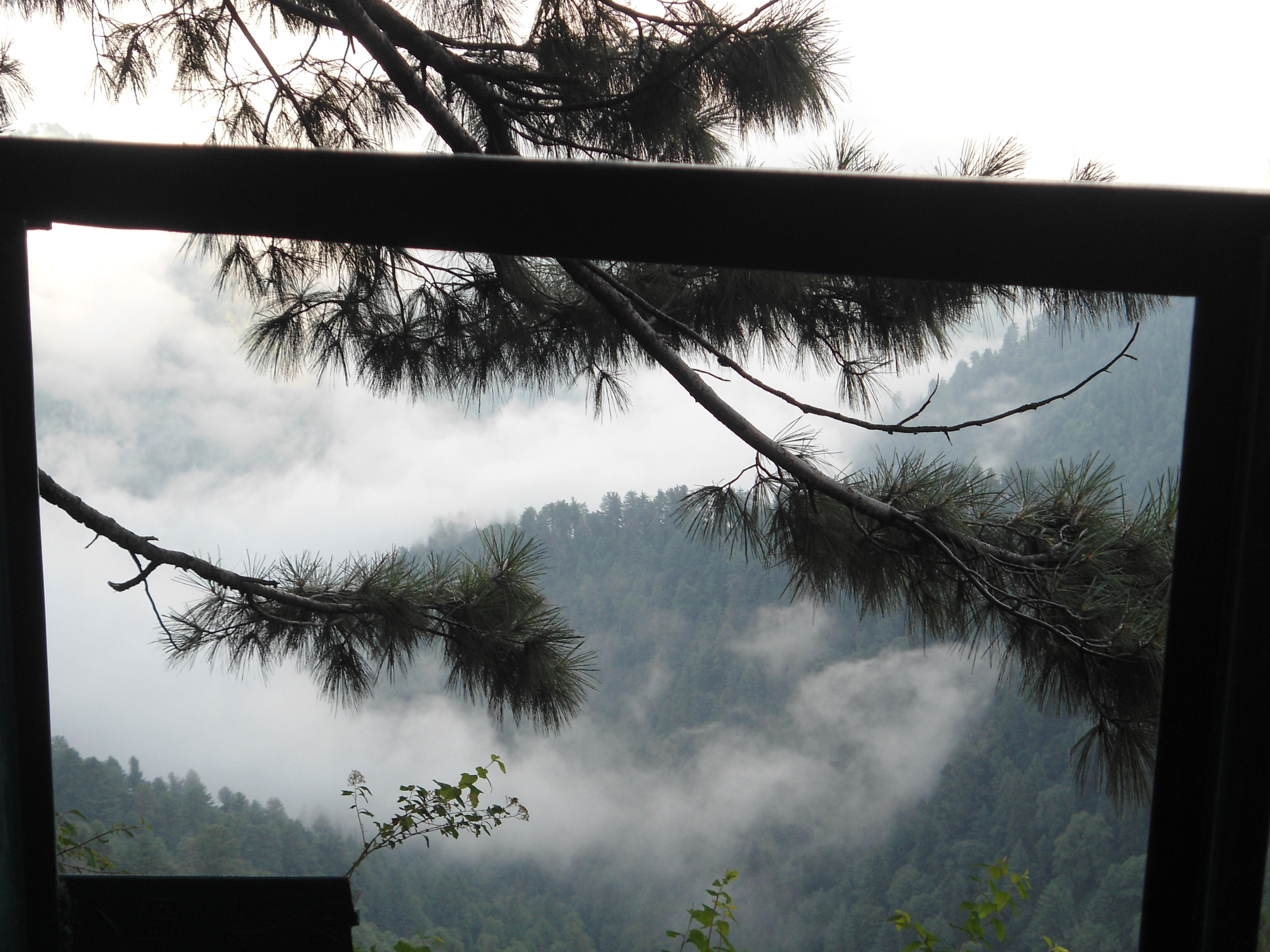
Track between Donga Gali and Ayubia known as Ayubia National Park track.

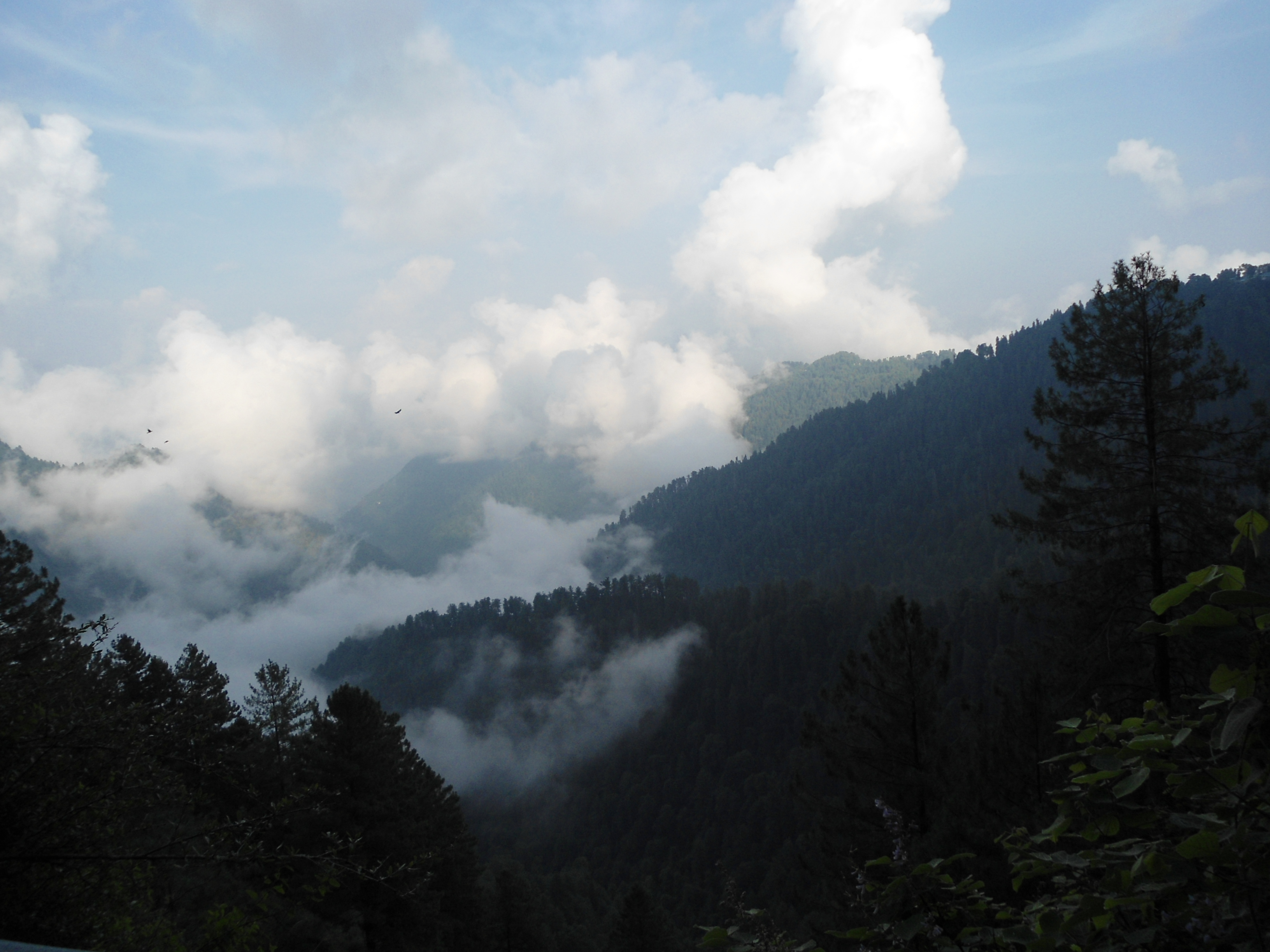
A view of mountains from track between Donga Gali and Ayubia known as Ayubia National Park track.

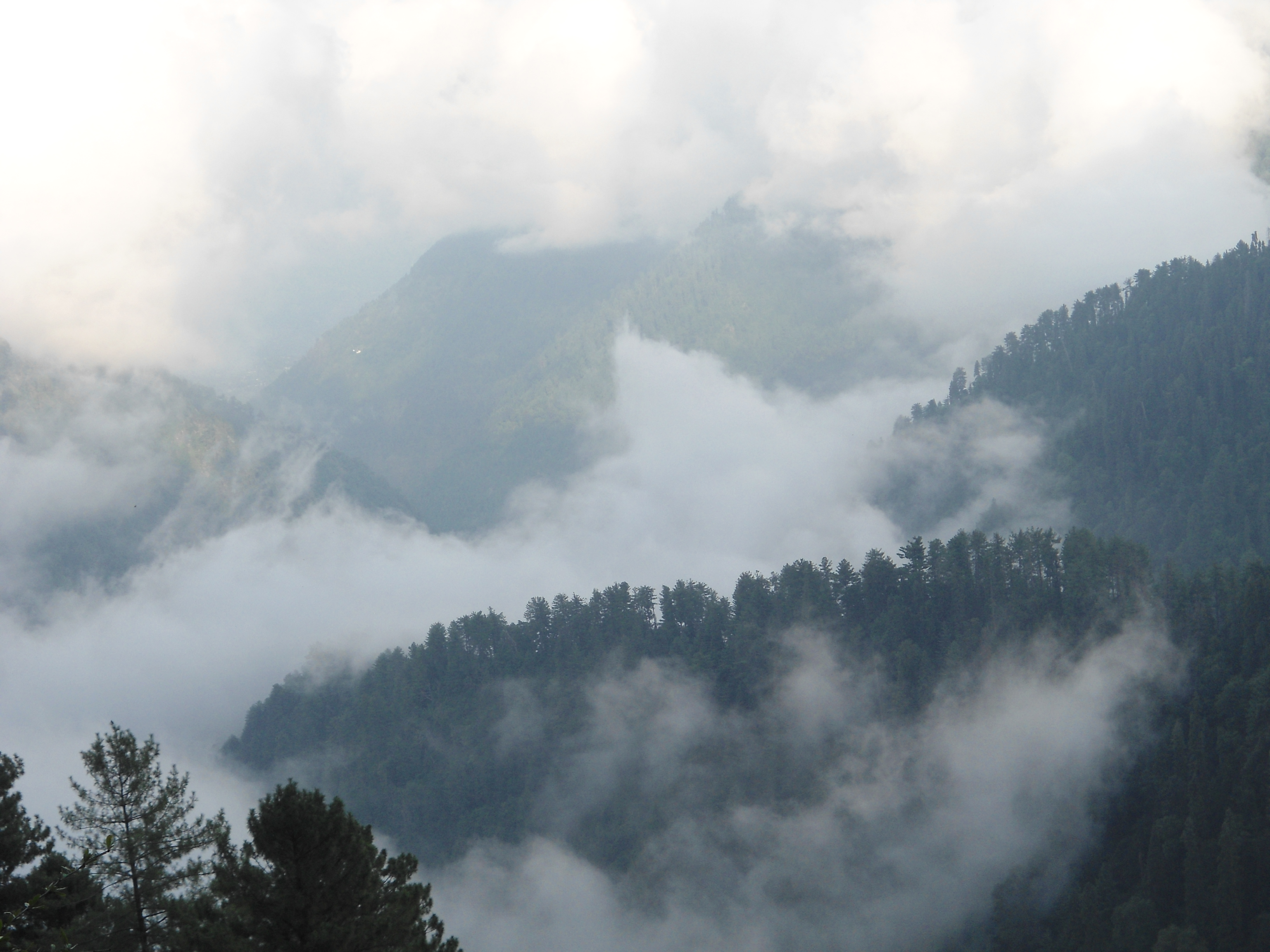
Cloud can be seen from track between Donga Gali and Ayubia known as Ayubia National Park track.

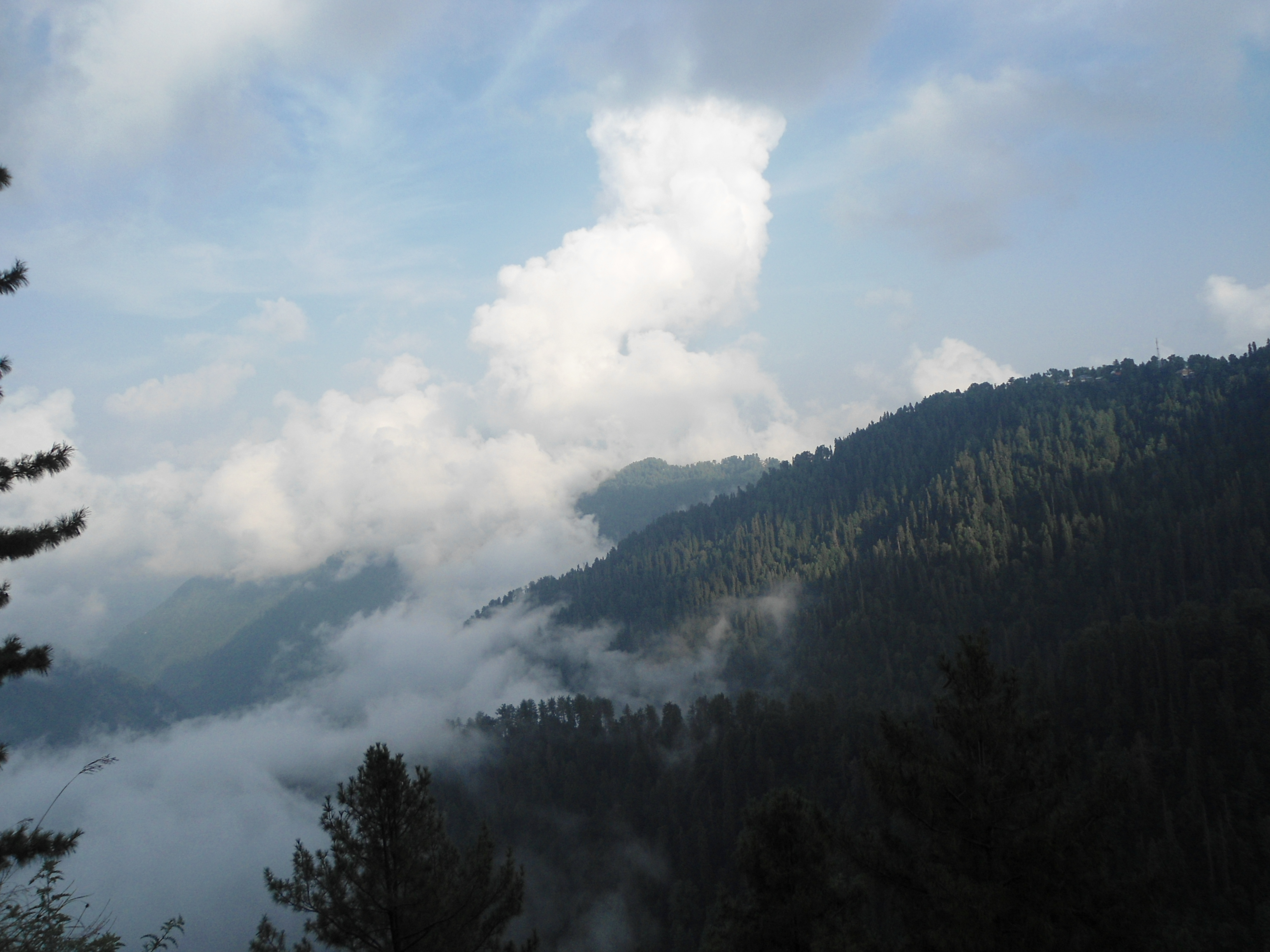
Ayubia National Park track.

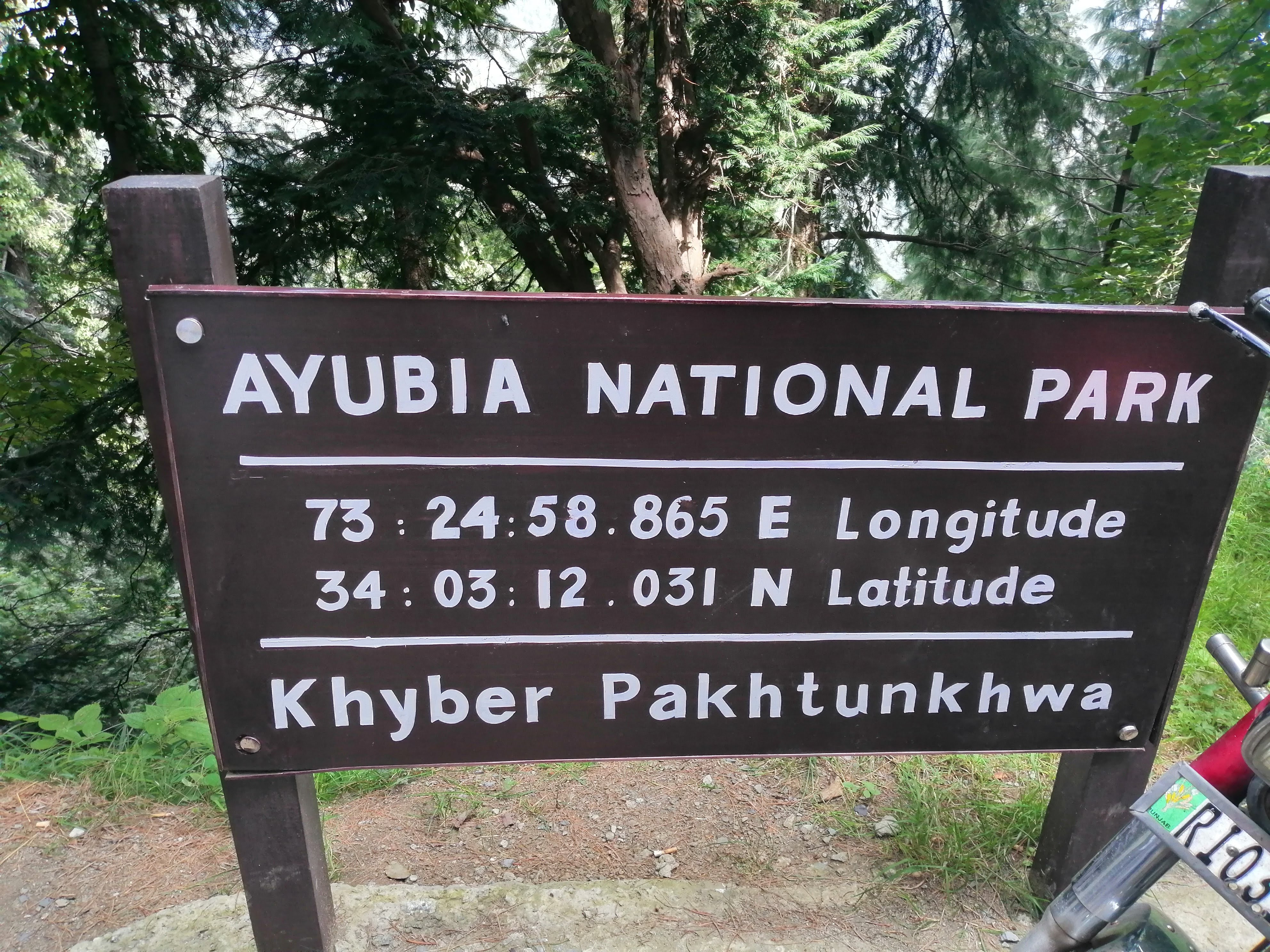
A board at the entrance of Pipeline Track showing its co-ordinates.

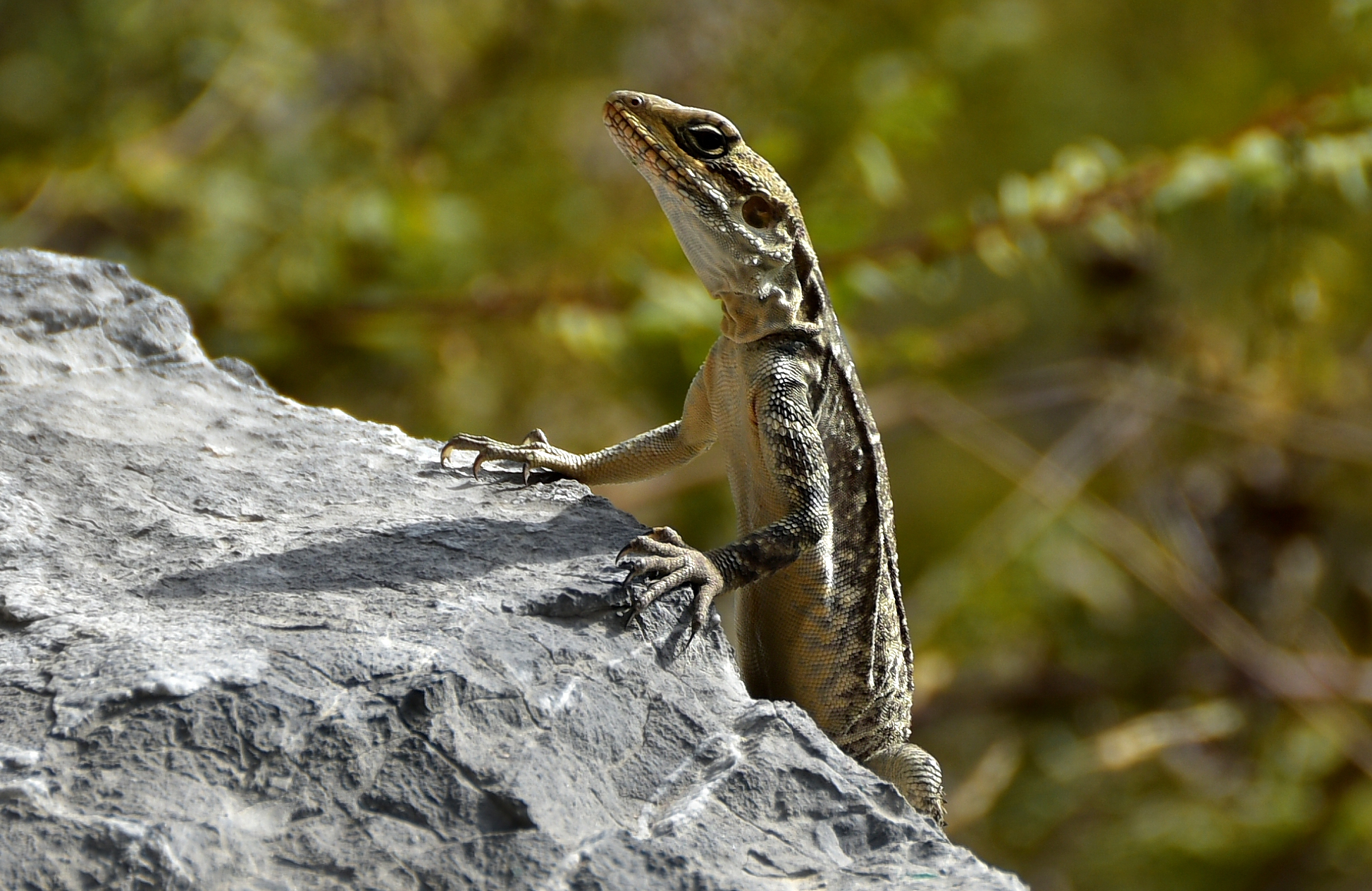
Kashmir Rock Agama can be found here.

== Controversies ==
In September 2023, the park faced a proposed de-notification, a decision contested by wildlife department officials, bio-environmentalists, and legal experts who have labeled it as unlawful. Concerns have been raised that this de-notification is primarily driven by a motive to expand grazing areas for illicit activities, notably timber smuggling. If the de-notification is approved, the organization Galiyat Tahaffuz Movement intends to legally challenge this decision in court.

== See also ==
- List of national parks of Pakistan
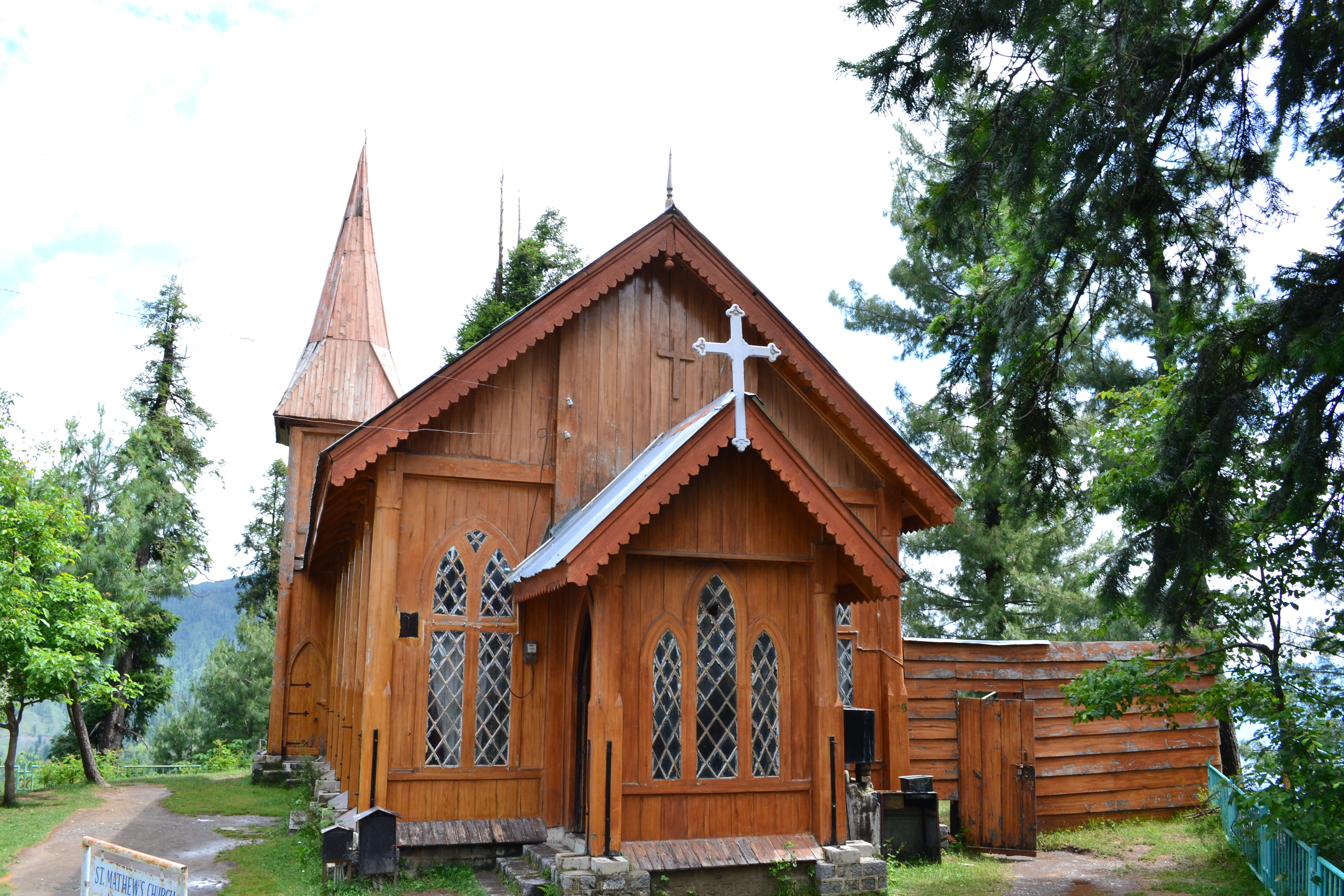
