= Dakar (disambiguation) =

Dakar is the capital and largest city of Senegal.

Dakar may also refer to:

- Dakar Region, one of the 14 regions of Senegal, which includes:
  - Dakar Department
- Dakar Rally, annual rally raid organised by the Amaury Sport Organisation
- Dakar (album), an album by jazz musician John Coltrane
- DaKAR, a 2014 album by South African hip hop musician Kwesta
- DaKAR II, a 2016 album by South African hip hop musician Kwesta
- Dakar (actor) (1921–2004), a Peruvian actor
- INS Dakar, an Israeli submarine
- Dakar 4x4, a kit car

== See also ==
- Daka (disambiguation)
- Dakka (disambiguation)
- Dakkar, a historical town in Ethiopia
- Dhaka (disambiguation)
- Dhakar (disambiguation)
