= Mushkpuri Top =

Mountain in Khyber Pakhtunkhwa, Pakistan

Mushkpuri
- مُشکپوری
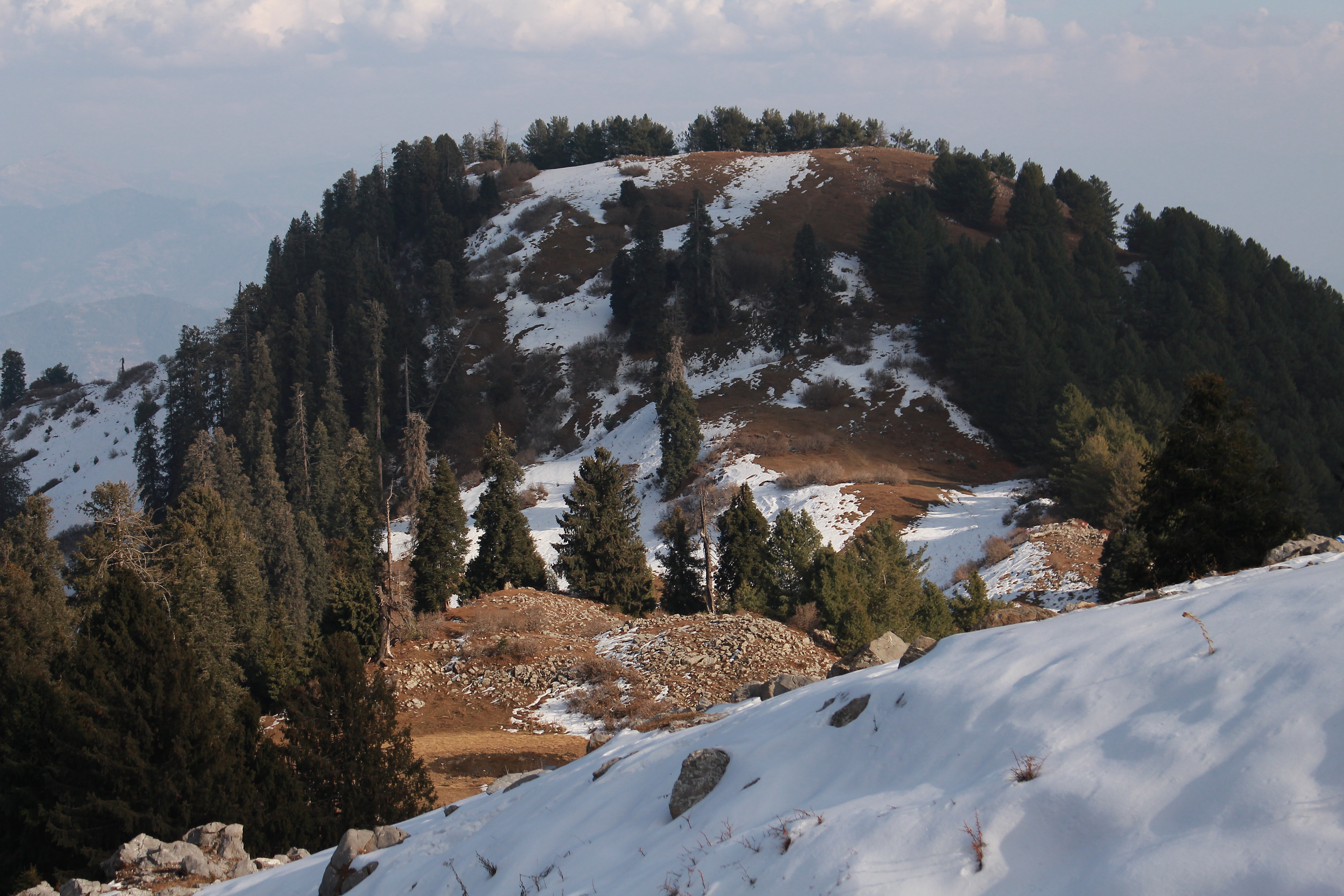
- Snowy Mountains of Mushkpuri

Highest point
- Elevation: 2,800 m (9,200 ft)
- Listing: Nathia Gali Hills
- Coordinates: 34°04′N 73°23′E

Naming
- Etymology: Urdu: مشک (musk, scent stored in deer's navel) and Puri (city)
- Language of name: Urdu; Hindko

Geography
- Location: Abbottabad, Khyber Pakhtunkhwa, Pakistan
- Country: Pakistan
- Province: Khyber Pakhtunkhwa
- District: Abbottabad District

Climbing
- Easiest route: The Dungagali Trackway
- Normal route: Dunga Gali Track

Mushkpuri is located above the Nathia Gali Hills in Nathia Gali Union Council.

Mushkpuri Top (Urdu: مشکپوری) is a 2,800-metre-high (9,200 ft) mountain in the Nathia Gali Hills, in the Circle Bakote Region of Abbottabad District of the Khyber Pakhtunkhwa province in northern Pakistan. It is 90 kilometres (56 mi) north of Islamabad, just above Dunga Gali in the Nathia Gali area of Ayubia National Park. It is the second highest peak in the Galyat Region after Miranjani which is located at 2,992 metres (9,816 ft). Much of the mountain is covered with Western Himalayan subalpine conifer forests. In 1858 following a survey carried out during the British Raj it was described as being "clothed with deodar to its summit, and pines, firs, oaks, rhododendrons, walnuts, and other forest trees."

== The peak ==
The route from Nathia Gali on western side of mountain is a steady and 4-kilometre-long (2.5 mi) climb. The mountain also has a route on the Dunga Gali side, with a steeper slope. There is a bird sanctuary on this side created with the help of the European Union.

From the top of Mushkpuri peak, on the eastern edge of Khyber Pakhtunkhwa, the following areas can be seen: — Circle Bakote, Abbottabad University of Science and Technology, Jhelum River, the Bagh District of Azad Kashmir, in the south the city of Murree and the Murree Tehsil, as well as Islamabad.

== Gallery ==
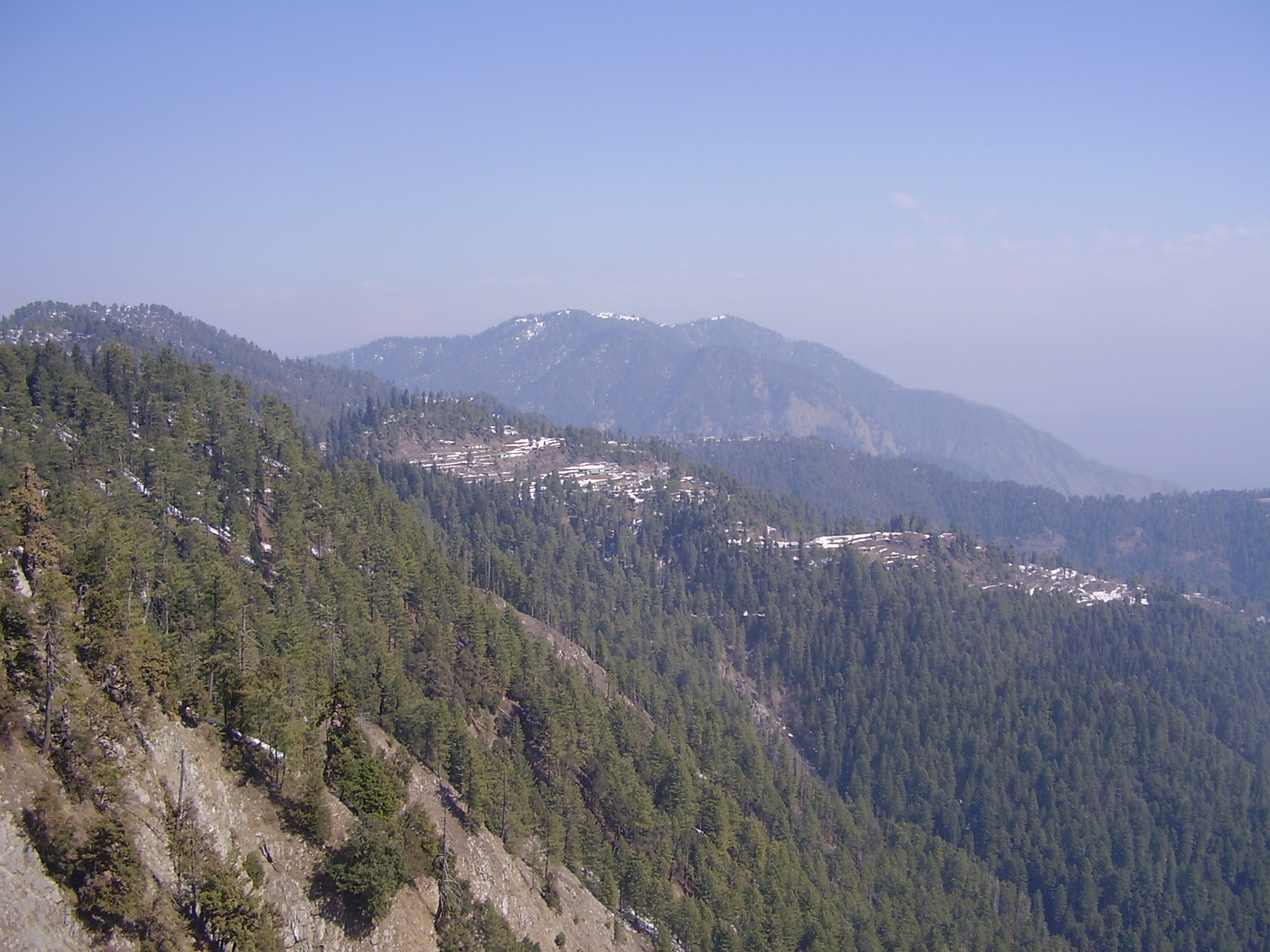
Mushkpuri mountain and the Nathia Gali in Ayubia National Park

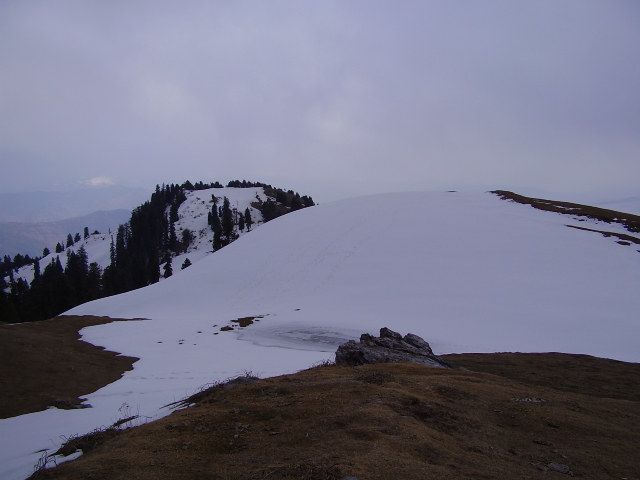
The top of Mushkpuri peak

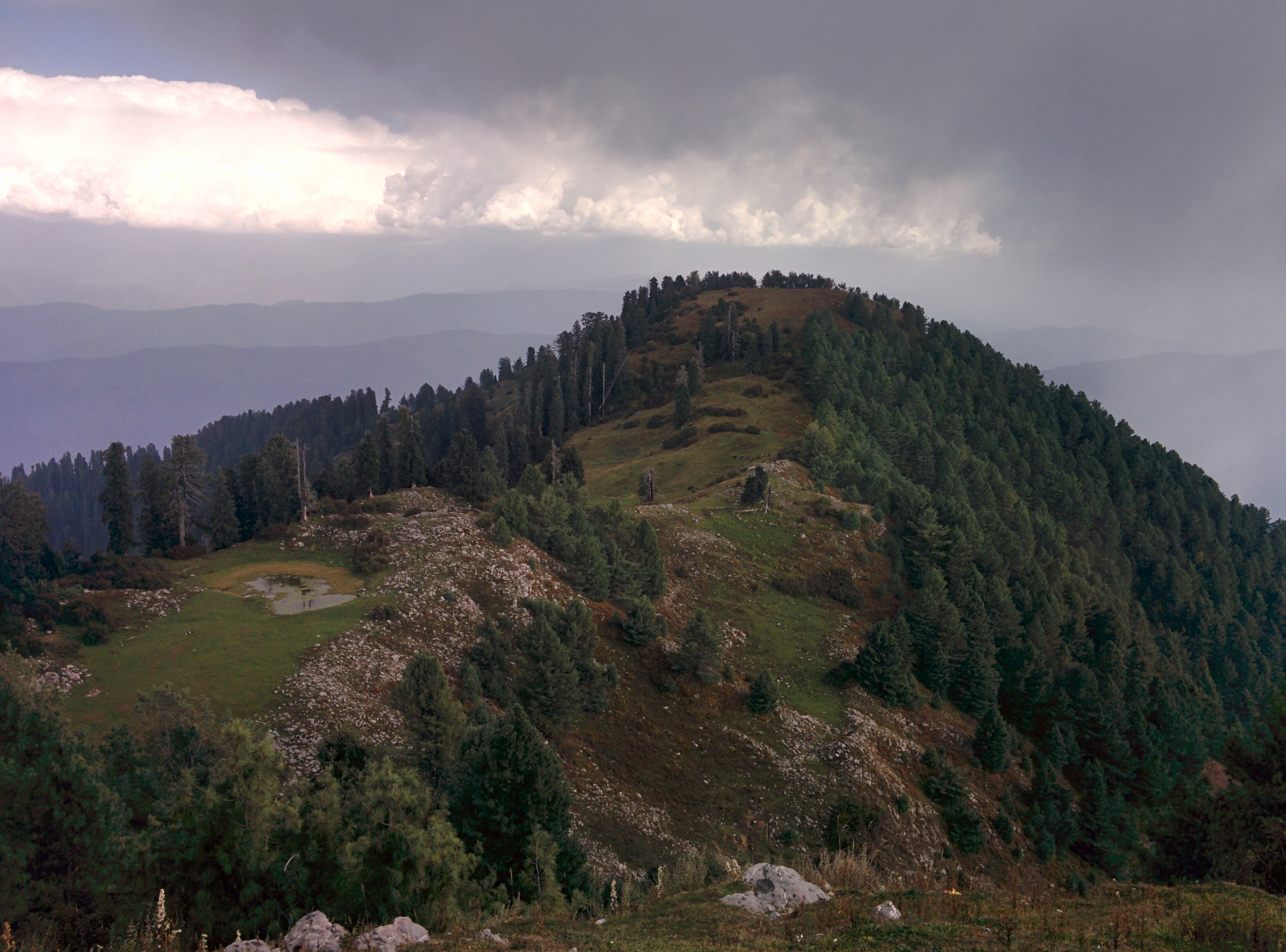
View from Mushkpuri

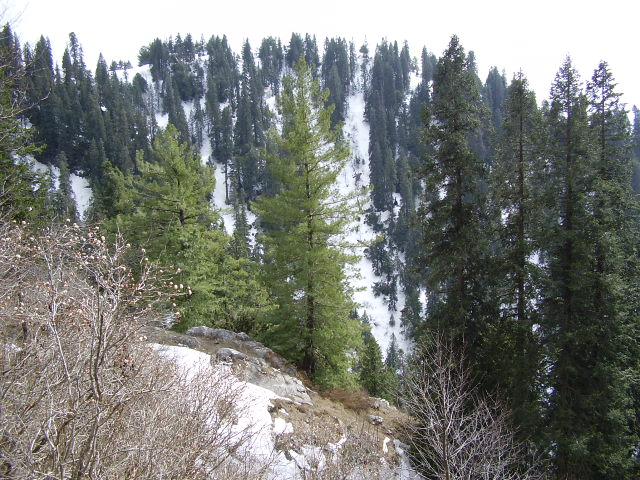
Conifer forests on the mountain.

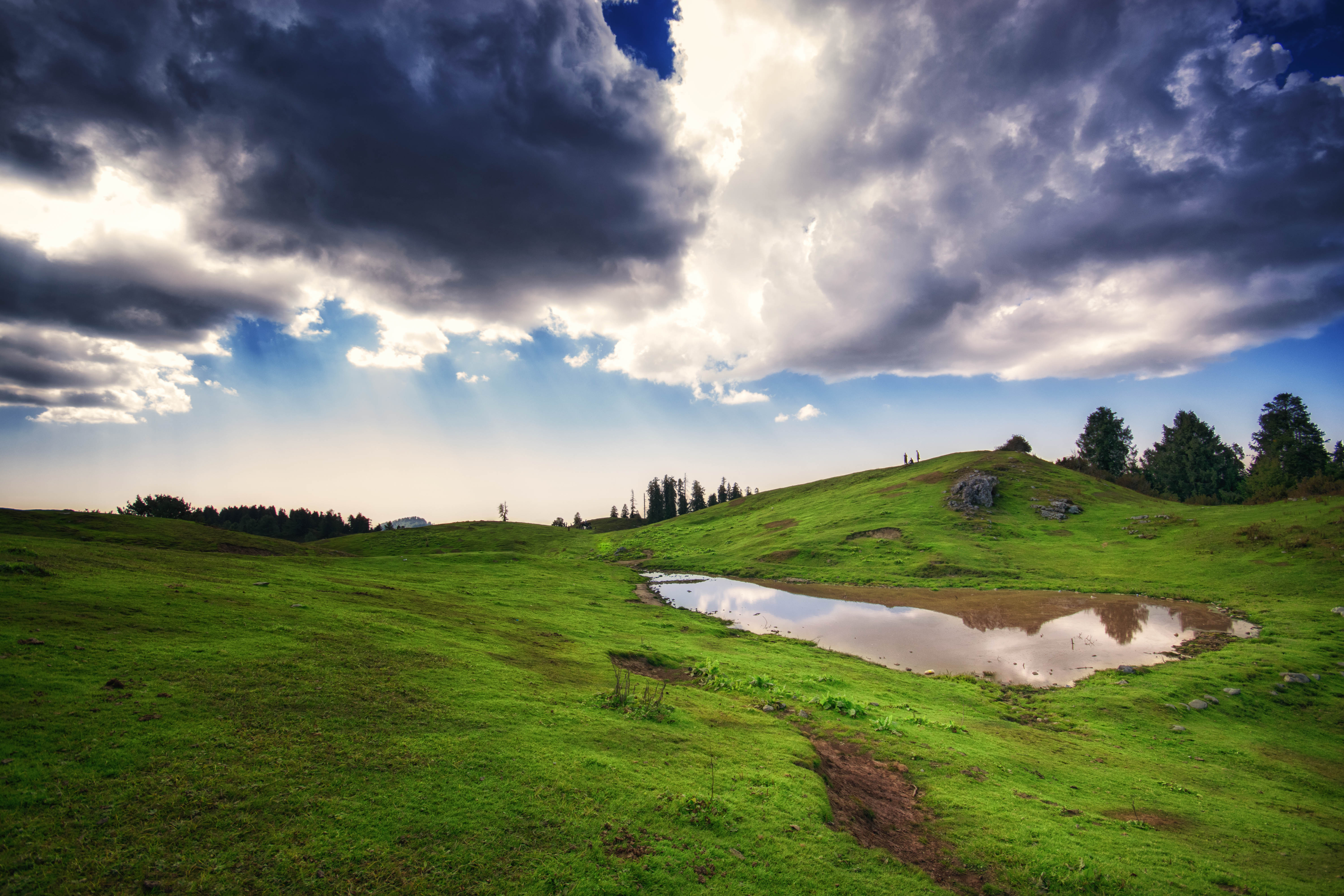
Mushkpuri Top

== See also ==
- List of mountains in Pakistan
- Galyat region - the local region and its towns
- Murree - adjacent in the Murree District
