= Dhak =

Dhak may refer to:

- Butea monosperma, also known as palash, flame of the forest or parrot tree
- Dhak (instrument), a type of Indian drum
- Dhak railway station, in Punjab, Pakistan

== See also ==
- DAK (disambiguation)
- Dhaka (disambiguation)
- Dhak Dhak, a 2023 Indian drama film by Tarun Dudeja
- Dhak Dhak In Dubai, an Indian music TV show
