= Dhakar (disambiguation) =

Dhakar is a Hindu caste found in Rajasthan.

Dhakar or Dhakari may also refer to :

- Dhakar (clan), a clan of Gurjar (Gujjar) community
- Vivek Dhakar, an Indian politician
- Dhakar, Pakistan, a town in Gujjarat, Division Pakistan
- Dhakari, a village development committee in Seti Zone, Nepal
- Dhakari Rural Municipality, a rural municipality in Sudurpashchim Province, Nepal

== See also ==
- Dakar (disambiguation)
- Dhaakad, a 2022 Indian Hindi-language action film
- Dakar Rally, an off-road rally raid
