= Dunga Gali =

Town in Pakistan

Coordinates: 34°03′20″N 73°25′0″E

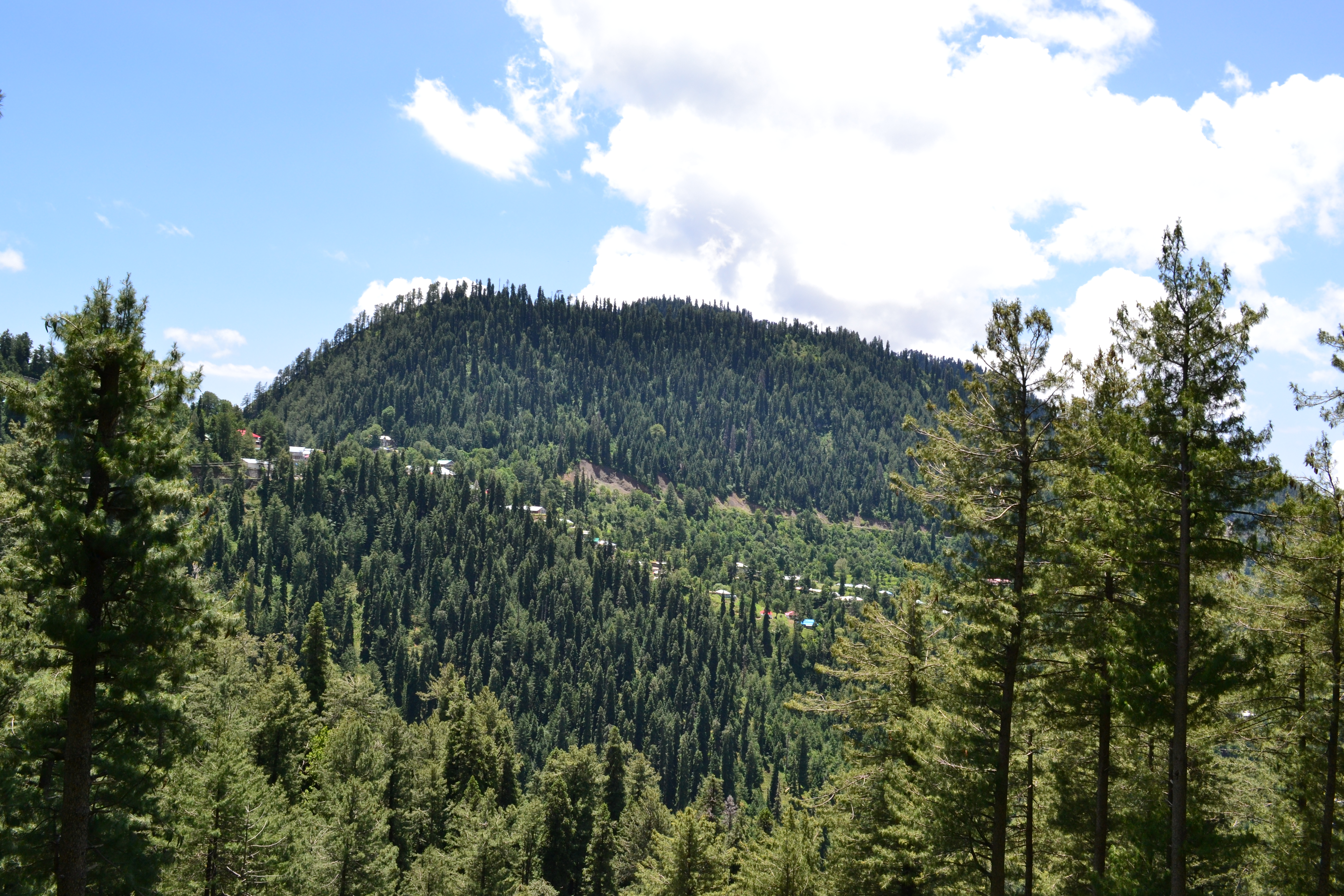
Tilla Donga beside locality

Dunga Gali is located in Nathia Gali Union Council.

Dunga Gali is one of the towns of the Galyat area of Ayubia National Park, at an altitude of 2,500 metres (8,200 ft) in northern Pakistan. Dunga Gali is located in Nathia Gali Union Council (subdivision) of Abbottabad District in the Khyber Pakhtunkhwa province. It is 3 kilometres (1.9 mi) from Nathia Gali. Dunga Gali is part of the NA-18, Abbottabad-II constituency. and 34 km from the district capital Abbottabad.

The Himalayan poplar grows in this region along with Aesculus indica, Prunus cornuta, and Juglans regia. Thousands of tourists trek and hike in Dunga Gali every year. During the onset of the COVID-19 pandemic in 2020, tourism stopped. But in May 2021, tourists once again returned to the area.

The Haro River originates from the southern slopes of the Dunga Gali range, branching into two main tributaries: the eastern stream, known as Dhund, and the western, called Karral Haro. These two converge and flow into the Haripur District. To the south of Dunga Gali lies the Dunga Gali Fault, which is a geological fault that forms part of the tectonics of the Himalayan orogeny, where the Indian plate collides with the Eurasian plate.

== History ==
During the British Rule, Dunga Gali served as a sanatorium to British soldiers and contained a hotel, church and a post office. The area was also visited by Europeans, who also had houses on the southern slopes of the nearby Mukeshpuri Mountains. The Dunga Gali range (which is the highlands around the hill station) formed Abbottabad's eastern boundary with the princely state of Kashmir.

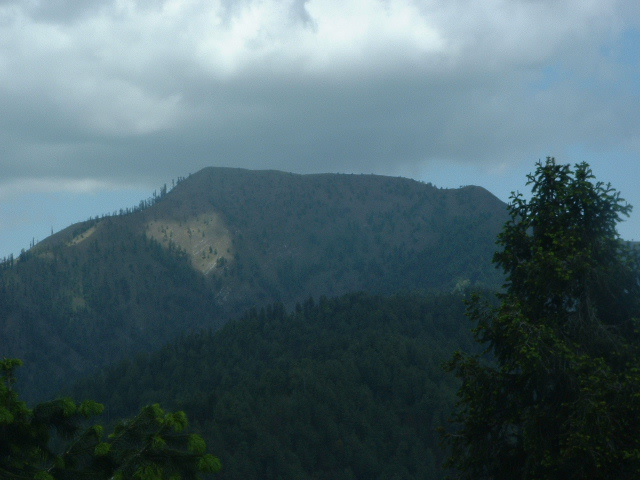
Mukeshpuri Mountain

== See also ==
- Nathia Gali
- Ghora Gali
- Ayubia National Park
