= Dumaguete Academy for Culinary Arts =

Cooking school in the Philippines

Dumaguete Academy for Culinary Arts (DACA)
- Type: Private
- Established: 2010
- President: Günther Sanin
- Location: Dumaguete, Negros Oriental, Philippines; 9°18′31″N 123°18′34″E
- Campus: Rizal Boulevard
- Website: www.daca-international.com

The Dumaguete Academy for Culinary Arts (DACA) is the first international culinary arts school in Dumaguete. DACA International is located at the Rizal Boulevard corner Noblefranca Street in Dumaguete. DACA offers an International Culinary Arts Diploma accredited by World Association of Chefs Societies, the Verband der Köche Deutschlands e.V. and the Technical Education and Skills Development Authority of the Philippines, TESDA.

== History ==
Günther Sanin's vision of an international culinary academy in the Visayas goes back to the late 1990s when he started to support several Restaurants and Resorts to achieve international kitchen standards. With the growing demand for international kitchen and management skills, he saw the markets potential and opportunities. In 2009 the conceptualization of DACA International began and took form. Early 2010 the DACA curriculum was approved and the Dumaguete Academy for Culinary Arts started the first Batch for the Culinary Arts Diploma on May 3, 2010.

== Education ==
The full culinary arts program of DACA offers students the opportunity to earn the Diploma of International Culinary Arts. DACA's Ladderized Education Program follows the TESDA guidelines. The short courses are designed for small groups with interest in culinary arts who want to gain knowledge in certain fields. The Academy also cooperates with Silliman University and offer courses which adds culinary management knowledge to Silliman University's Business Management Entrepreneur Program.

=== Academic programs ===
The full Culinary Arts Program is an intensive 36-week program split into 3 trimesters.

Culinary Arts 1

- Kitchen Job / Workplace Kitchen
- Food Fundamentals/Simple meal preparation
- Preparation of egg cookery
- Preparation of salad, vegetables, mushrooms etc.
- Menu cards

Culinary Arts 2

- Magazine and Service
- Sauces and Soups
- Dough and Masses
- Cold Buffet: Sandwiches/Dairy, Beverages

Culinary Arts 3

- Module: Meat, Meat Processed Products & Cold Cuts
- Module: Poultry and Game
- Module: Fish and Mollusks/ Shellfish
- Module: Cakes, Cookies and Pastries
- Module: Frozen Desserts and Sauces
- Module: Cheese and Appetizer/Starters

=== Short Programs ===
The Short Programs of DACA covering the culinary fields of restaurant management, meat and poultry, bakery and pastry, European kitchen, modern table service and beverages. The duration of this programs goes from one day to several weeks.
