= Dhaka, North West Delhi =

Dhaka
- Neighbourhood
- Location in Delhi, India
- Coordinates: 28.7078°N 77.2057°E
- Country: India
- State: Delhi
- District: North West Delhi
- Time zone: UTC+5:30 (IST)
- PIN: 110009
- Eminent Person: Ayush Chauhan

Dhaka, also known as Dhaka Dheer, is an urban village in the North West district of Delhi, India, and is located near Kingsway Camp.

It hosts 1500 houses and two chaupals and park, namely Prithvi Raj Chauhan Park. Much of the agricultural land in the village was acquired by the Delhi Development Authority post the partition of India to house migrants from Pakistan. These areas include Outram Line, Mukherjee Nagar, West Mukherjee Nagar, Bhai Parmanand Colony, Indira Vihar, Gandhi Vihar and Nehru Vihar. A large structure called the Pathar Wali Kothi, originally constructed by a Muslim family before the partition of India, stands in this small settlement.

Delhi University is situated merely 1.5 km (0.93 mi) from Dhaka. Its proximity to the university as well as to Mukherjee Nagar (a hub for IAS coaching classes) makes it a preferable location to rent student accommodation. Consequently, many single rooms are available to students in the area. Other notable places near the village include Harijan Sevak Sangh (Gandhi Ashram), Nirankari Sarovar, Batra Hall and Naini Lake in Model Town. Government Sarvodaya Vidyalaya also caters to primary school students.

The International Hostel for Girls is also located near Dhaka, and is near Guru Teg Bahadur (GTB) Nagar Metro Station and is primarily inhabited by people from the northern part of India mostly Chauhans (Rajputs) and Panchals. The area houses accommodation for students studying in DU and for IAS coaching class.
