= Ghora Dhaka =

Dhaka
- Location within Pakistan
- Coordinates: 34°1′49″N 73°24′30″E
- Country: Pakistan
- Province: Khyber-Pakhtunkhwa
- Elevation: 2,212 m (7,257 ft)
- Time zone: UTC+5 (PST)

Ghora Dhaka, also known as Ghora Dakka, is one of the tourist mountain resort towns of the Galyat area in northeast Pakistan. It is part of the Ayubia area and is located in the Abbottabad District in the province of Khyber Pakhtunkhwa. It is located at 34°1'49N 73°24'30E and has an altitude of 2212 metres (7260 feet). It lies on the road linking Dunga Gali to Murree, being 3 miles south of Dunga Gali and 15 miles north of Murree.

== History ==
During British rule, the town served as a cantonment, and during the summer months was occupied by a detachment of British infantry. This is the origin of the name Ghora Dhaka, which means "white soldiers hill".
