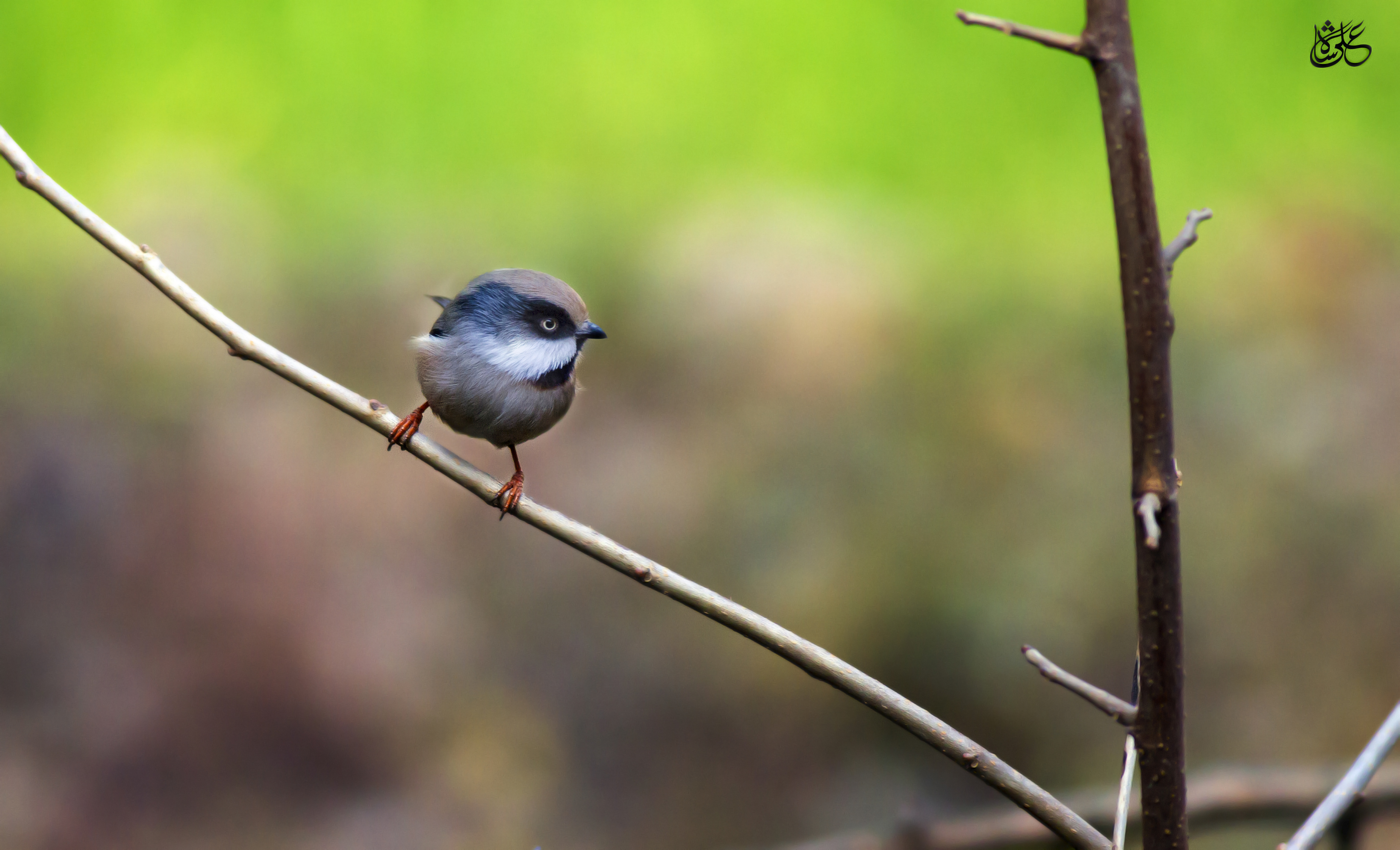

Conservation status
- Least Concern (IUCN 3.1)

Scientific classification
- Kingdom: Animalia
- Phylum: Chordata
- Class: Aves
- Order: Passeriformes
- Family: Aegithalidae
- Genus: Aegithalos
- Species: A. leucogenys

Binomial name
- Aegithalos leucogenys (Moore, F, 1854)
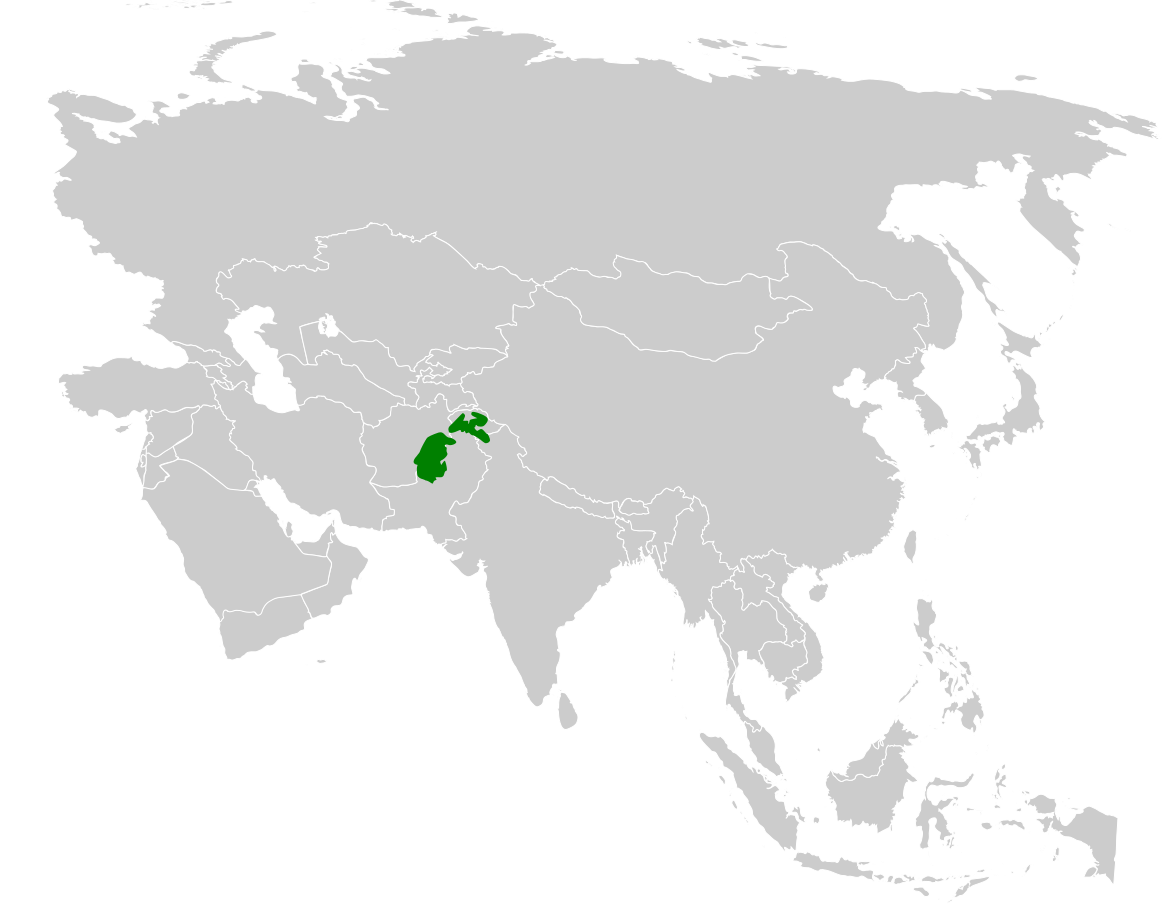

= White-cheeked bushtit =

Species of bird

The white-cheeked bushtit (Aegithalos leucogenys), also known as the white-cheeked tit, is a species of bird in the family Aegithalidae. It is found in Afghanistan, India, and Pakistan.

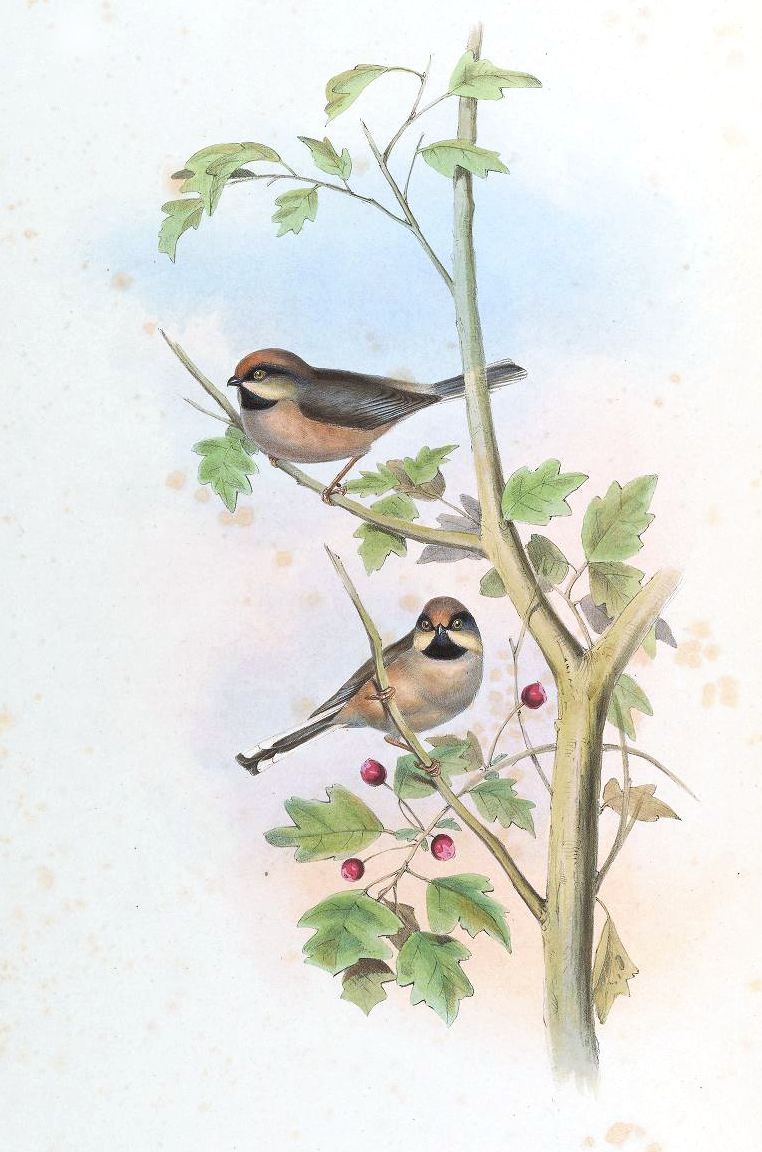
An image of aegithalos leucogenys by Gould
