= Sayyad =

- Location in Afghanistan
- Coordinates: 35°52′25″N 68°25′49″E
- Country: Afghanistan
- Province: Baghlan Province
- Time zone: + 4.30

Sayyad is a village in Baghlan Province in north eastern Afghanistan.

== See also ==
- Baghlan Province
