= Bakot Union Council =

Administrative unit or Union Council in Pakistan

Bakot
- Union Council

- Location within Khyber Pakhtunkhwa Location within Pakistan
- Country: Pakistan
- Province: Khyber Pakhtunkhwa
- District: Abbottabad
- Tehsil: Abbottabad
- Headquarters: Bakot

Population (2017 Census of Pakistan)
  - Total: 17,466

Bakot is a union council of Abbottabad District in Khyber-Pakhtunkhwa province of Pakistan.

According to the 2023 Census of Pakistan, the population was 18,172, of which 9,090 were male and 9,080 were female.The Union Council of Bakot is subdivided into three areas namely: Bakot, Moolia and Sangal.
