= Nathia Gali =

Nathia Gali نتھیا گلی
- Hill station
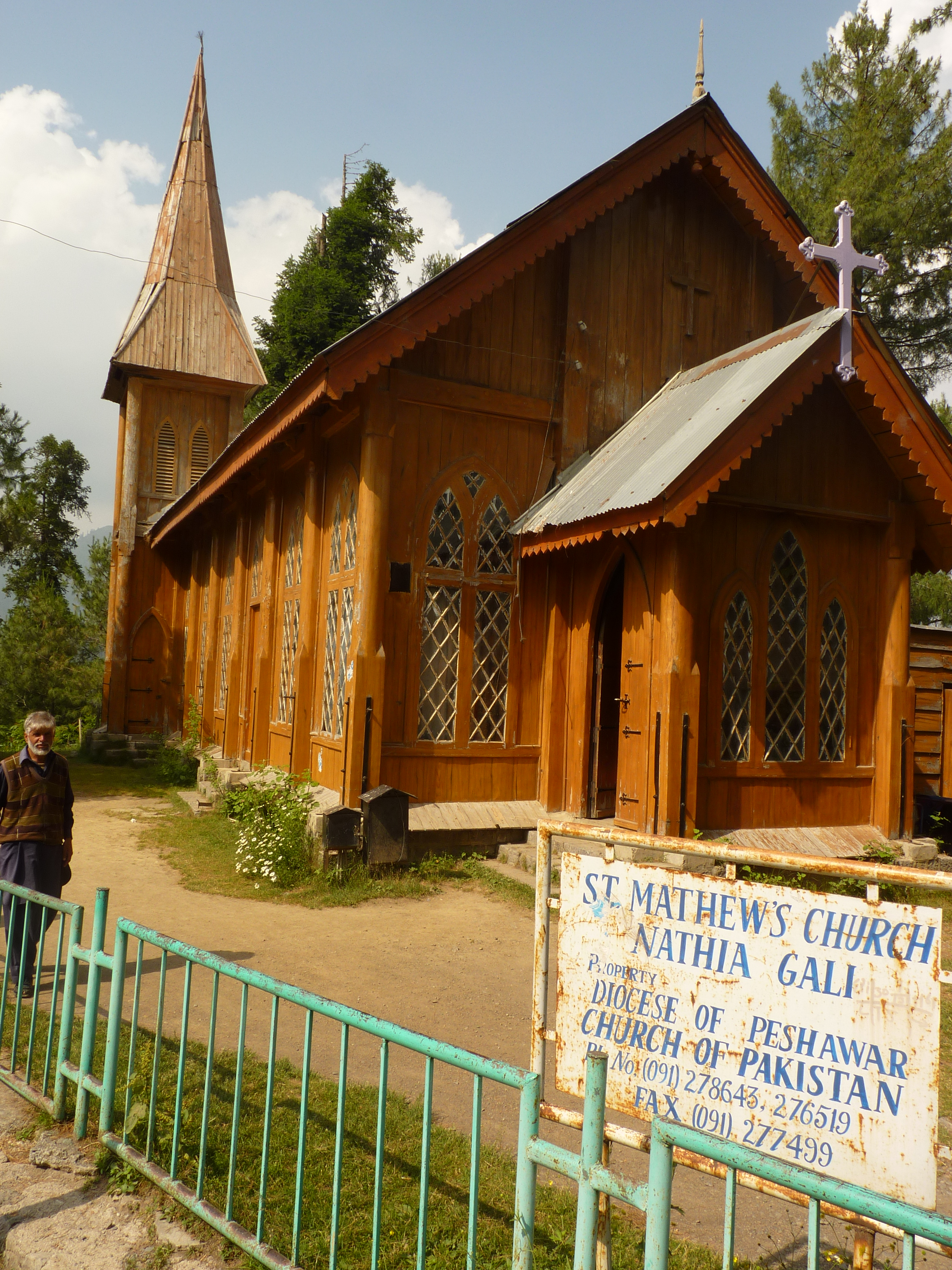
- Nathia Gali's St. Matthew's Church, which was built during British colonial rule, photographed in 2014

- Location within Khyber Pakhtunkhwa Location within Pakistan
- Coordinates: 34°04′N 73°23′E
- Country: Pakistan
- Province: Khyber Pakhtunkhwa
- District: Abbottabad District
- Tehsil: Abbottabad Tehsil
- Elevation: 2,410 m (7,910 ft)
- Time zone: UTC+5:00 (PST)

Nathia Gali or Nathiagali (Urdu: نتھوکا گلی) is a hill station and mountain resort town located in the Abbottabad District of Khyber Pakhtunkhwa, Pakistan. It is located at the centre of the Galyat tract of the Himalayas, where several hill stations are situated. It is situated approximately 32 kilometres (20 mi) away from both Murree and Abbottabad. Nathia Gali is known for its scenery, hiking trails and weather, which is much cooler than the rest of the Galyat tract due to it being at a higher altitude.

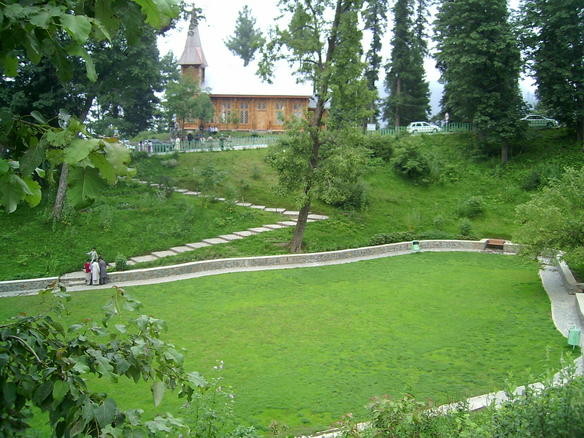
Ayubia National Park

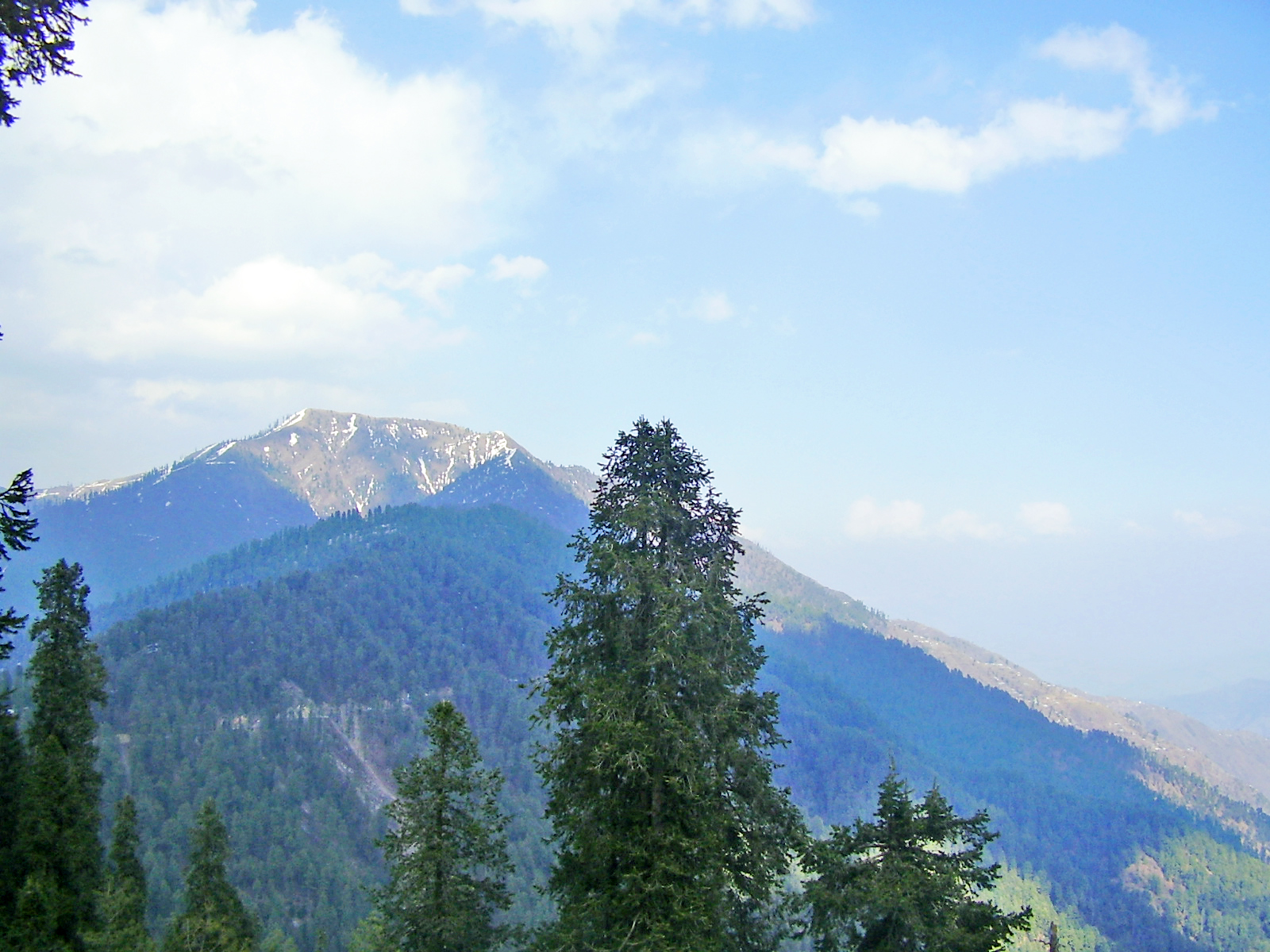
A view of Miranjani peak from Nathiagali

== History ==
During British rule, Nathia Gali, then part of Abbottabad tehsil of Hazara District, served as the summer headquarters of the Chief Commissioner of the (then) Peshawar division of the Punjab. The town, along with Dunga Gali constituted a notified area under the Punjab Municipalities Act, 1891. The income in 1903-04 was Rs. 3,000, chiefly derived from a house tax, while expenditure was Rs. 1,900.

== Climate ==
Nathia Gali has a subtropical highland climate (Cwb) under the Köppen climate classification. Due to its elevation of about 7,900 feet, the town enjoys cool summers and cold winters. The weather of Nathia Gali remains cool, pleasant and foggy in summers (1 May to 31 August). During the monsoon season (1 July to 16 September), rain is expected almost every day. Cool winds start to lower temperatures in autumn. Winters (1 November to 28 February) are cold and chilly. In December and January, heavy snowfall may occur. The weather remains cool throughout the spring. In Nathia Gali, the most comfortable weather is during the summer season. Frequent rainfall occurs here annually. Annual rainfall ranges between 1,650 millimetres (65 in) and 1,850 millimetres (73 in). Summers are mild and pleasant, with daytime temperatures usually between 22 °C (72 °F) and 25°C, and nights staying cool at 13°C to 16°C. Winters are cold, with daytime temperatures around 6°C to 9°C, and nights dropping to between –4°C and 0°C. In colder spells, temperatures can fall as low as –6°C. Snowfall now mostly happens in February, though it used to be more common from late December to January.

== Subdivisions ==
Administrative subdivisions of Nathia Gali.

The Union Council of Nathia Gali is divided into the following areas: Bagan, Donga Gali, Jhansa, Keri Sarafali, Keri Raiki, Lassan, Malach, Nathiagali Pasala, and Badhair. Badhair is the central part of the Nathiagali Union Council.

== Demographics ==
The main tribe of Nathia Gali are the Karlal, and a minority of Dhunds (who now call themselves 'Dhund-Abbasis'). The locals are a kin to the people of other parts of Galyat and speak Hindko. Until well into the 1960s, most of these tribes and clans were mostly living rather basic and primitive lives, due to lack of educational and employment opportunities. Most of them had to seek jobs and education down in the plains and cities such as Rawalpindi, Lahore, Peshawar and even as far away as Karachi. However, in more recent times, with economic development, many of them are either employed locally in the tourism industry or in various jobs and businesses in the Abbottabad area. It is monitored by GDA.

== Transportation ==
The town is connected to Abbottabad and Murree by the Nathia Gali road. Public transport runs daily from Abbottabad and Rawalpindi to Nathia Gali.

Between December and January, heavy snowfall is possible in the area and the road leading to Nathia Gali may occasionally be blocked by heavy snow.

== Tourism ==
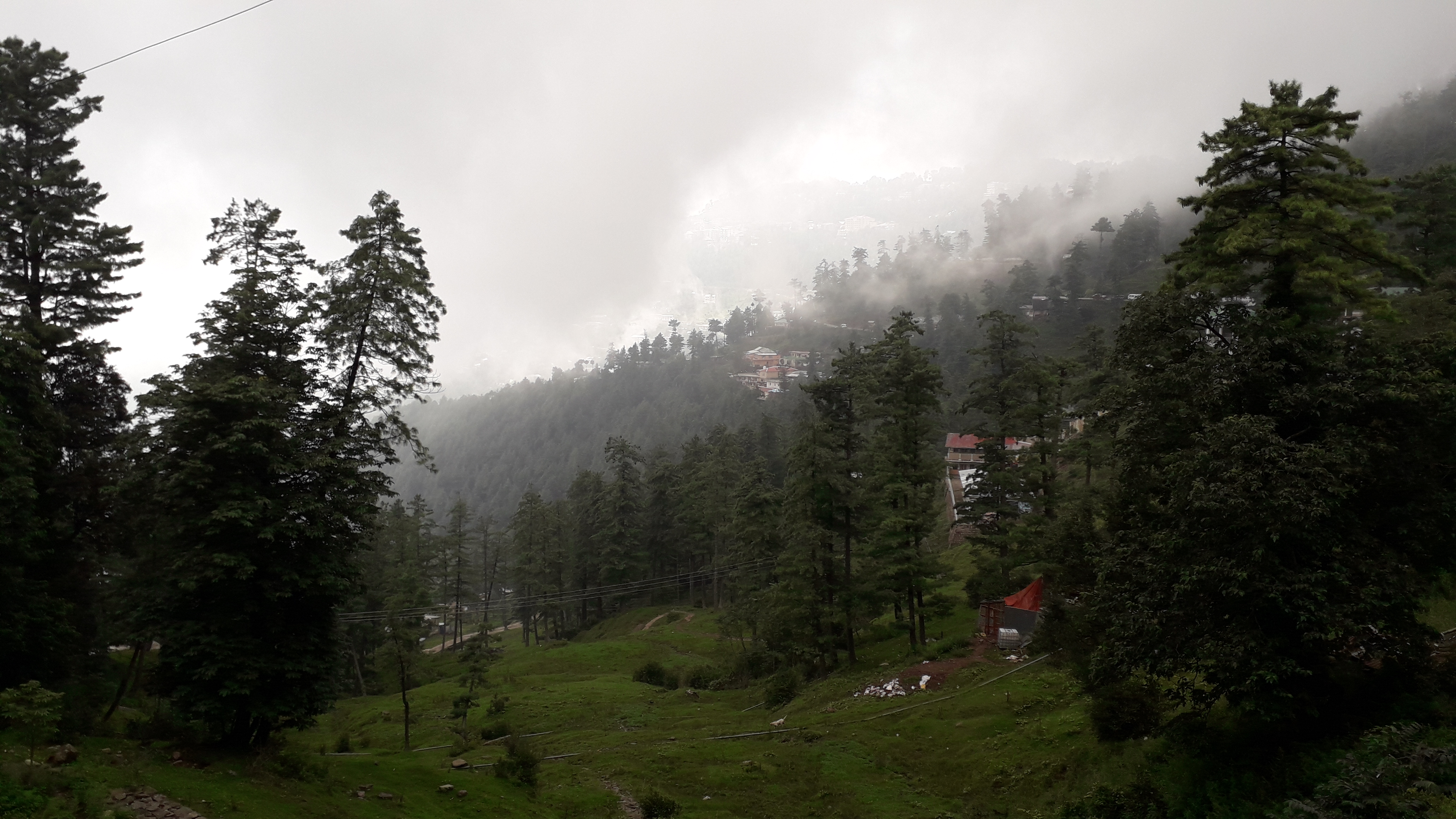
Forests and clouds give a breathtaking experience.

Nathia Gali also serves as the administrative centre of the Nathia Gali Union Council. It is located in the Abbottabad District, in Khyber Pakhtunkhwa. At an elevation of 2,410 metres (7,910 ft), it is a popular tourist resort in the summer months. It is forested with pine, cedar, oak, walnut and also other broad-leaved trees.

During the summer, Nathia Gali is relatively popular amongst tourists, but due to its limited area and availability of property, it is not thronged by as many people as the hill-station Murree, which is only an hour away, even though it has more recreation. Nathiagali is known for its trek that leads to Thandiani that passes through Dagri Naka. Ayubia National Park is also one of the spots here that tourists and nature lovers often visit.

The Nathia Gali Bazaar has a variety of local handicrafts and products available. From traditional shawls, scarves, and embroidered fabrics to intricate woodwork and handmade jewelry, this bazaar is a treasure trove for souvenir hunters.

Nathia Gali is known for its lush, green meadows and deep forests of oak, cedar and pine. In winter, snowfall adds to the scene. Nathia Gali has a church, St. Matthew's, a remnant from the British period and made entirely of wood. It is situated at the edge of the mountain with a nice panorama towards Kashmir. Nathia Gali has a small bazaar. Mukshpuri and Miranjani are two nearby high peaks. On a clear day, Nanga Parbat can be seen in the distance.

== Wildlife ==
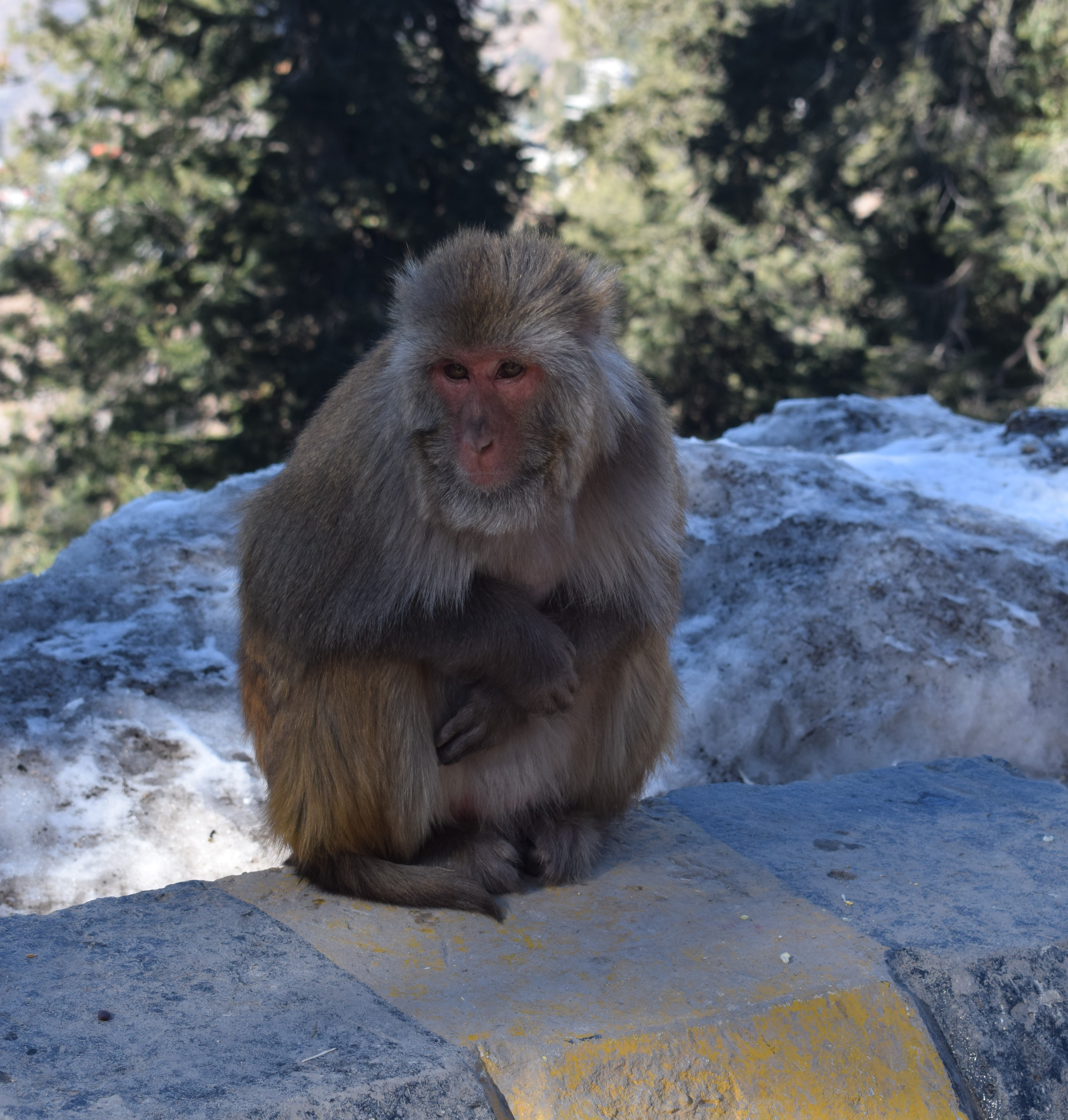
Monkeys (like the rhesus macaque (Macaca mulatta) in this photo) are frequently sighted in Nathia Gali and its surroundings

Nathia Gali is home to various species of birds, insects, butterflies and other animals such as rhesus monkeys. The World Wildlife Fund has an office in the Galyat and has assisted in the breeding and reintroduction of the species of the near-extinct common hill leopard in the forests of the Ayubia National Park, right by Dunga Gali and Nathia Gali. This area was thought to be a perfect habitat for them but according to local reports they frequently came out of the forest after cattle of the local villagers and were occasionally shot. Packs of pi-dogs, which were previously considered to be a nighttime menace, can no longer be seen anywhere in the Galyat; it is thought that most have been killed by leopards.

In the summer of 2006, several women were found dead in the deep valleys of Galyat with wounds from attacks. A large leopard was caught and eventually shot. His body has been stuffed and kept in the Dunga Gali Wildlife Museum, where he has been named the 'Ghost of Galyat'. However, despite their reputation, these leopards are rarely spotted.

== Gallery ==
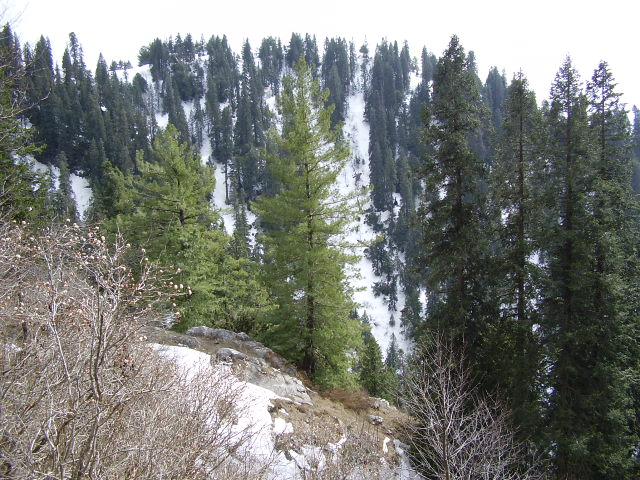

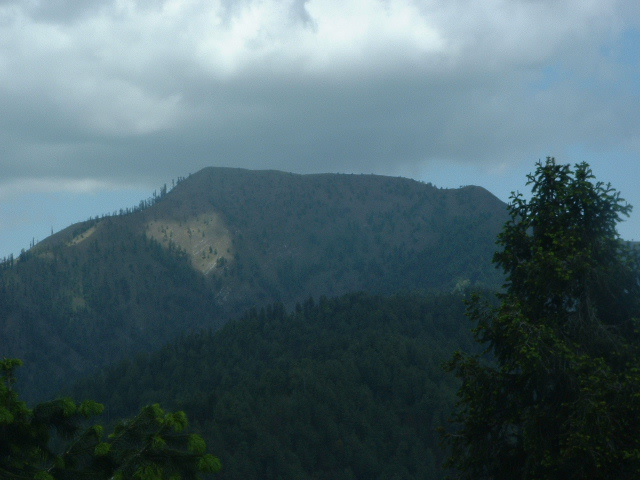

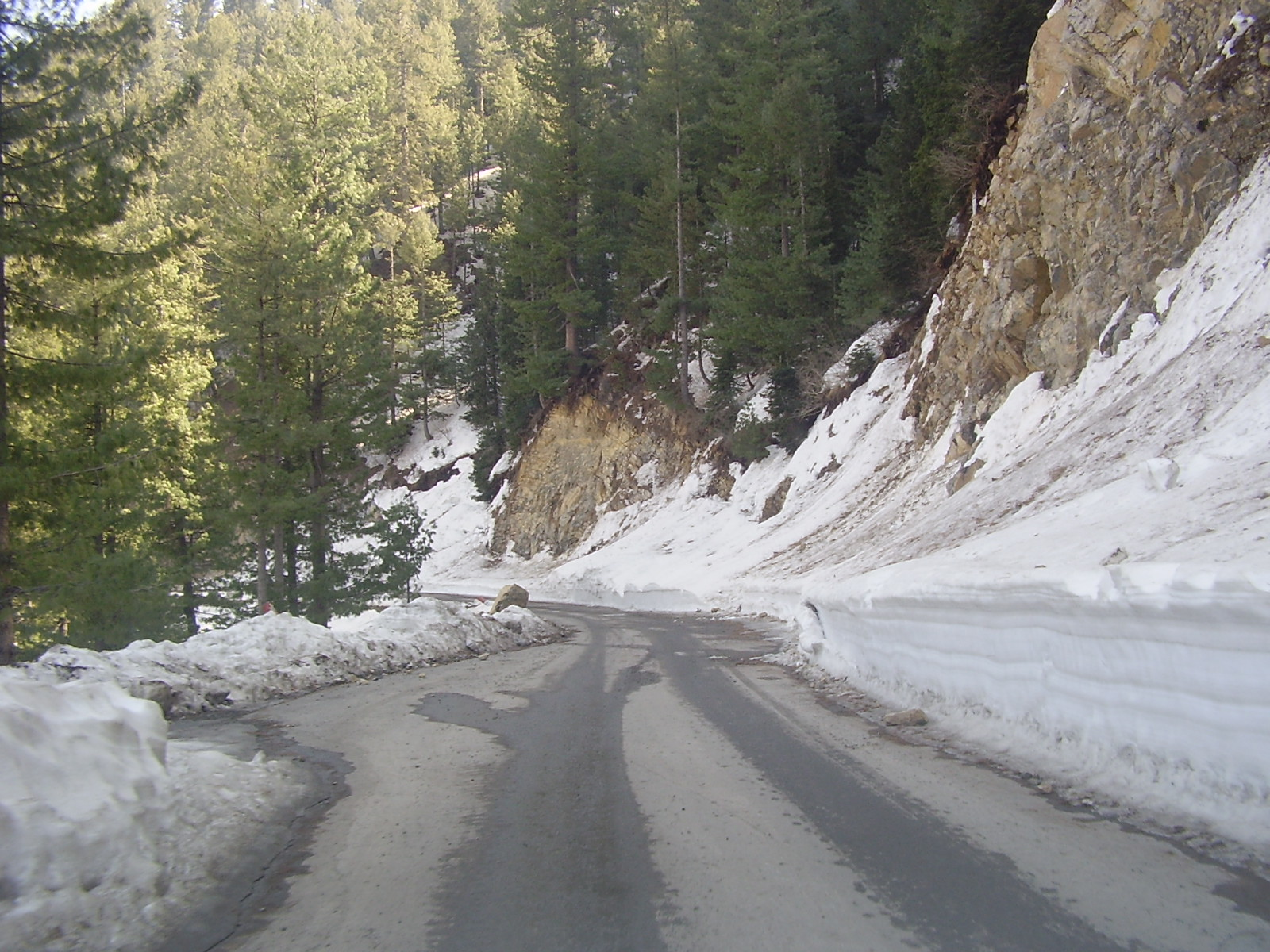

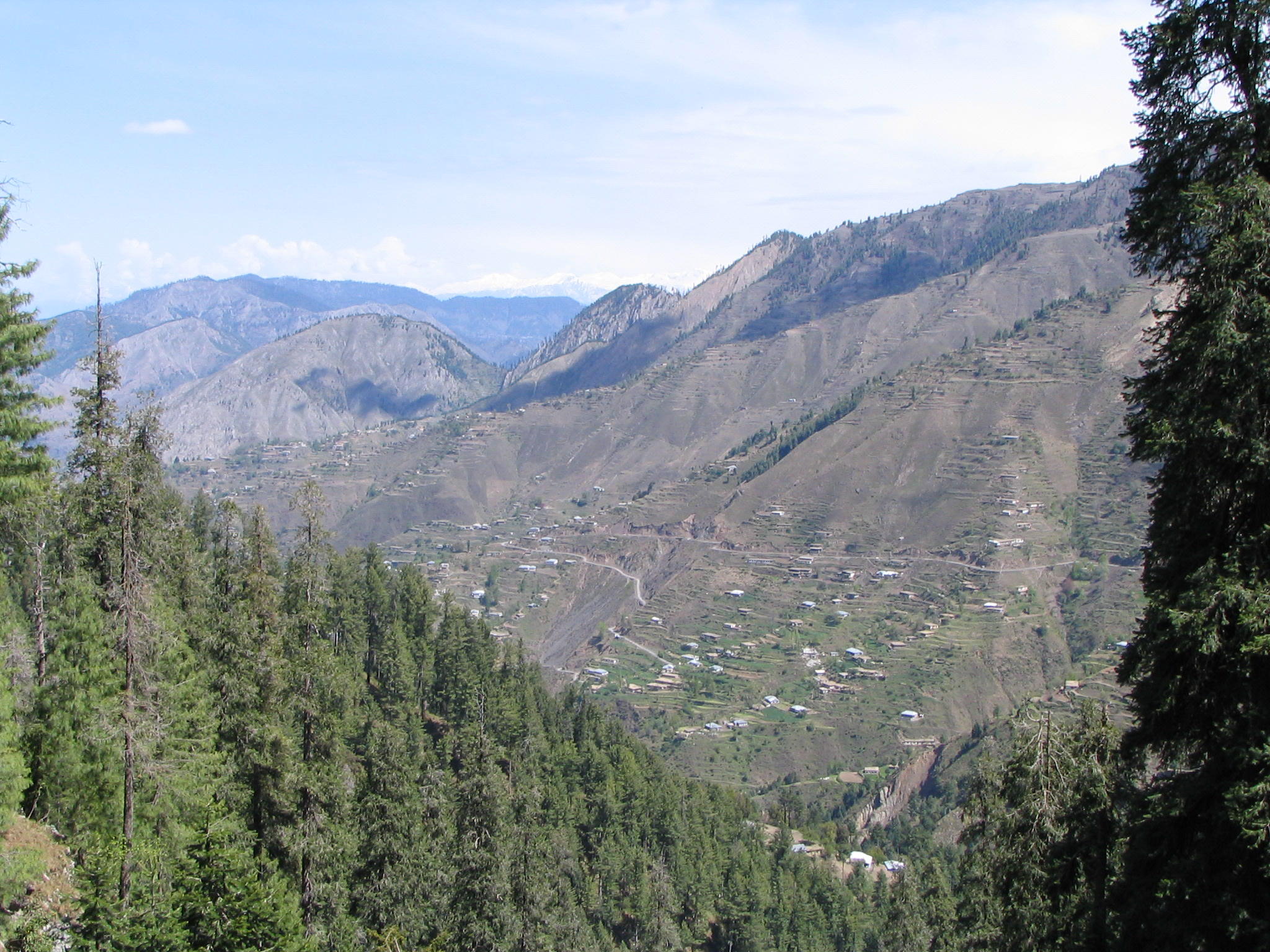
A view from Nathiagali

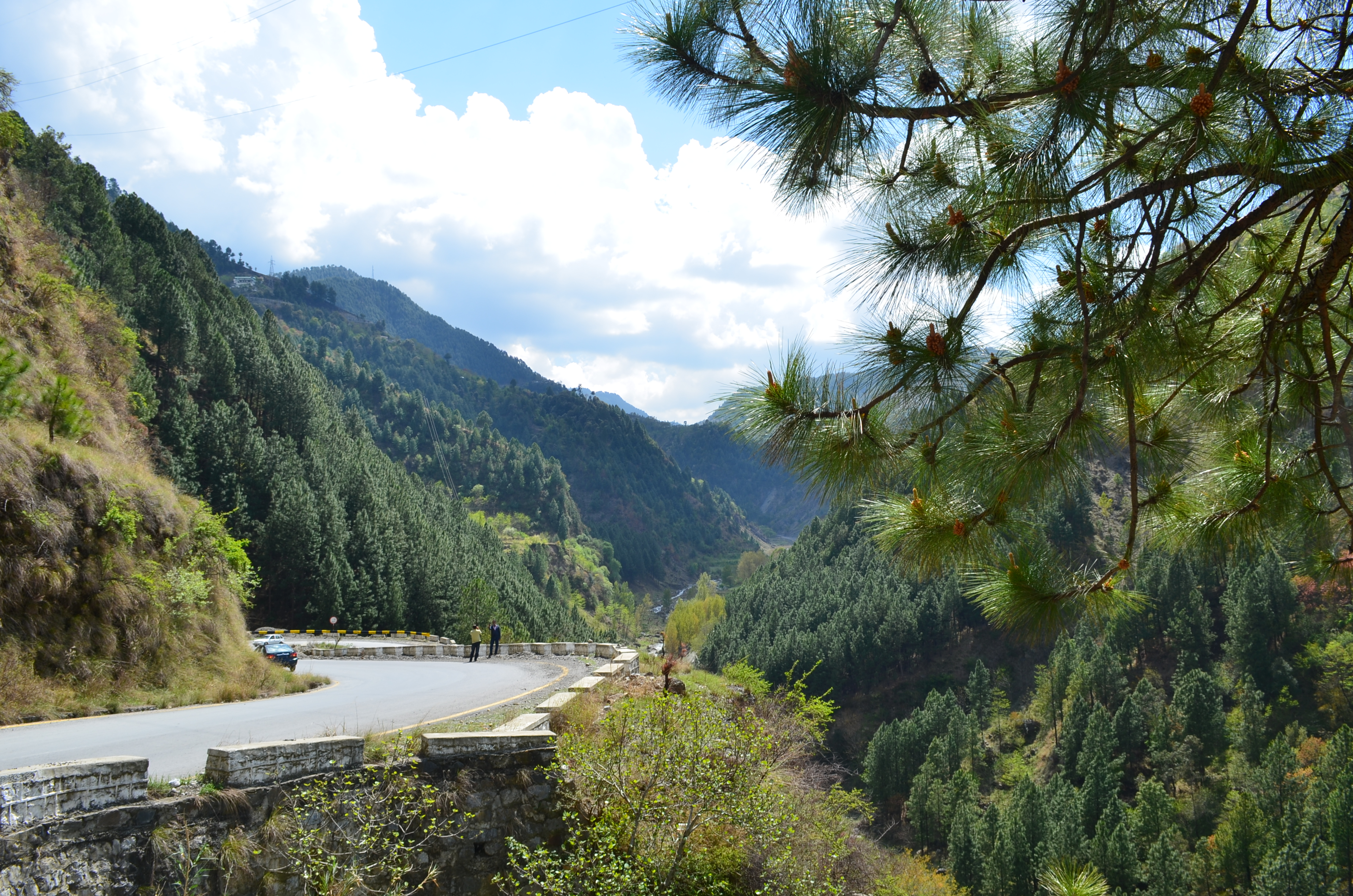
Abbottabad Nathiagali road

== See also ==
- Galyat
- Abbottabad
