= Khanaspur =

Town in Hazara, Khyber Pakhtunkhwa, Pakistan

Coordinates: 34°01′N 73°25′E

Khanspur Khanispur
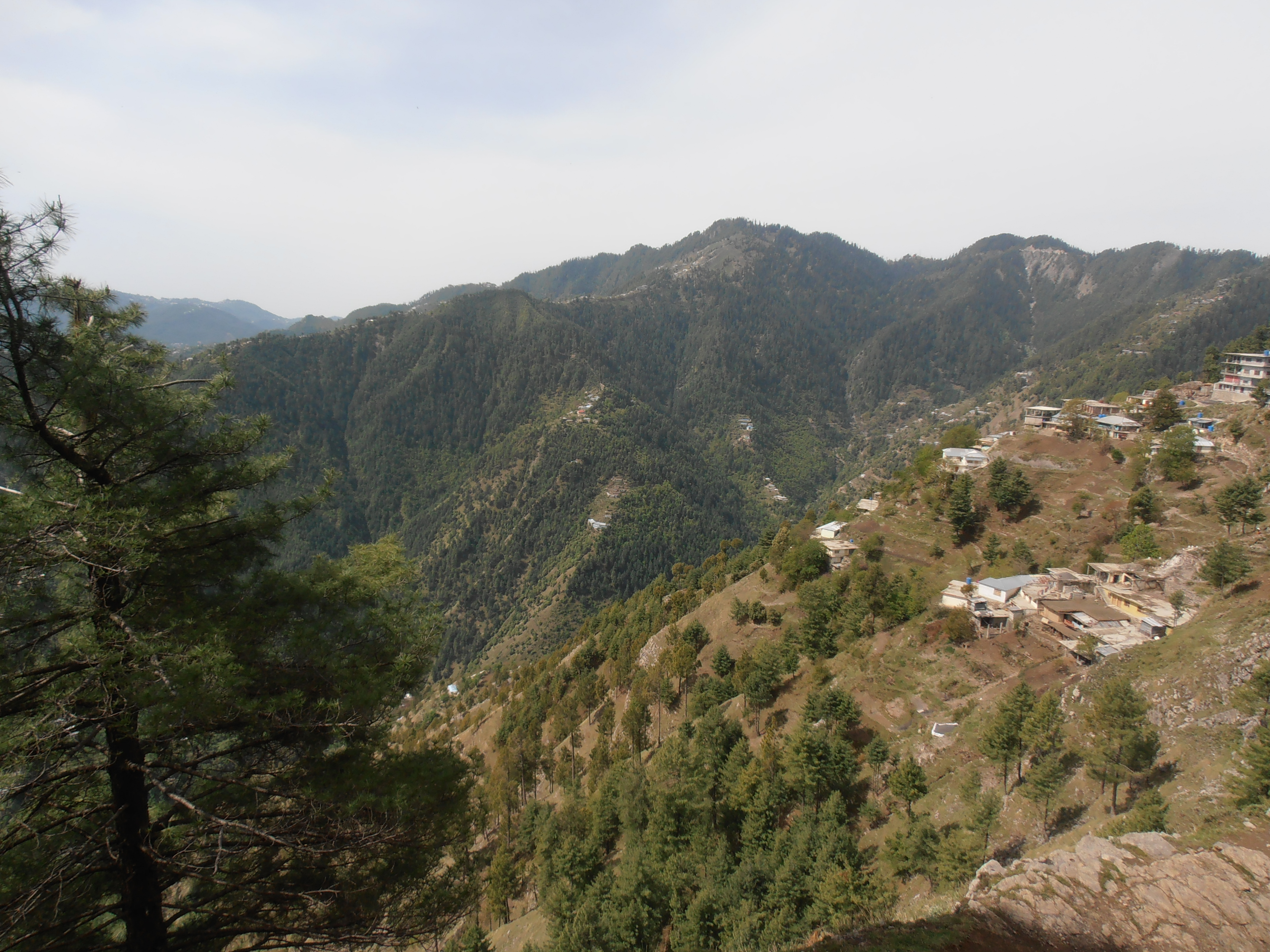
- Interactive map of Khanspur

Khanaspur (Urdu: خانسپور) is one of the tourist mountain resort towns of the Galyat area of Hazara region of the Khyber Pakhtunkhwa. Khanaspur is a settlement in the Ayubia area and is located in Abbottabad District in Khyber Pakhtunkhwa province of Pakistan. It also has the Punjab University Hostel. It also had the Bhutto House. During British rule it was occupied by a detachment of British infantry.

== Geography ==
It is situated at an altitude of about 2,250 metres (7,382 ft).

=== Climate ===
The average temperature during the months of June–September ranges from 21 °C to 26 °C with cool nights. During winter, extreme snowfall with freezing cold temperature is common with tropical alpine environment. Ayubia National Park is situated near Khanspur Village, consisting of temperate coniferous forest and a variety of Wild Life.

== Hotels in Khanaspur ==
- Canari Hotel
- Pineview huts
- Safari Palace
- Mount View Hotel
- Metro Inn Hotel
- Gohar Hotel
- Snow Hill Villas
- Breeze Inn Guest House
