= Sra Dhaka =

- Location within Pakistan
- Coordinates: 30.28°N 69.32°E
- Country: Pakistan
- Province: Balochistan
- District: Kalat
- Elevation: 1,353 m (4,439 ft)
- Time zone: UTC+5 (PST)

Sra Dhaka (Balochi: سرَ ڈھکا, Urdu: سرا ڈھکہ) is a village in the Balochistan province of Pakistan. It is located at 30°28'0N 69°31'60E with an altitude of 1353 meters (4442 feet).
