= Bakot =

Town in Pakistan

- Town
- Location within Khyber Pakhtunkhwa Location within Pakistan
- Coordinates: 34°5′39″N 73°29′9″E
- Country: Pakistan
- Province: Khyber Pakhtunkhwa
- District: Abbottabad
- Tehsil: Abbottabad

Population (2017 Census of Pakistan)
  - Total: 17,466

Bakot is a town of Abbottabad District, Khyber Pakhtunkhwa, Pakistan. It is located 45 kilometres (28 mi) north of Murree, at the base of the Miranjani peak. Bakot serves as principal town of the Union Council of the same name. According to the 2017 Census of Pakistan, the town had a population of 17,466.

== History ==
In the 1890s Bakot, referred to as Bukot, was mentioned by British geologist Charles Stewart Middlemiss as a village when he was doing a survey of the area as part of his geological fieldwork in Hazara for the colonial era Geological Survey of India.
