= Old Christian Cemetery, Abbottabad =

Cemetery in Khyber Pakhtunkhwa, Pakistan

- گورا قبرستان
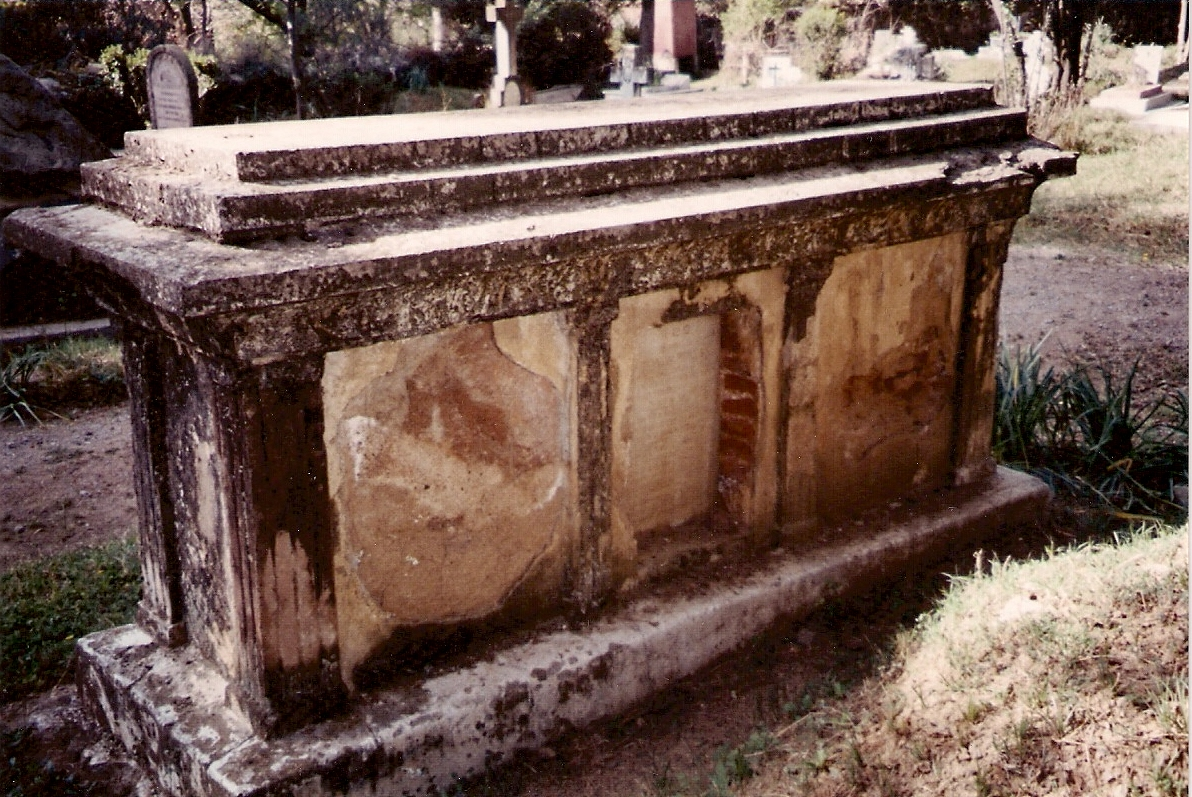
- One of the earliest marked graves (1853)
- Interactive map of Old Christian Cemetery, Abbottabad

Details
- Established: 1853
- Location: Near St Luke’s Church, Abbottabad, Khyber Pakhtunkhwa, Pakistan
- Coordinates: 34.1536°N 73.2079°E
- Type: Anglican cemetery
- Owned by: St Luke’s Church, Diocese of Peshawar
- No. of graves: ≈ 300 burials recorded (1853–1947), 70–80 surviving headstones

The Old Christian Cemetery, locally referred to as the Gora Qabristan (Urdu: گورا قبرستان, lit. 'white cemetery'), is a cemetery located in Abbottabad, Khyber Pakhtunkhwa, Pakistan. It was established in 1853 during East India Company rule and stayed in regular use following the British Crown's assumption of direct rule over India.

== History ==
The cemetery was established in 1853 when the modern city of Abbottabad was founded by James Abbott, a British military officer and administrator. It remained the main Christian cemetery in the town and for the nearby Galyat hill tracts, and was later attached to St. Luke's Church when it was completed in 1864. The cemetery contains many interesting old graves and memorials. Most of these have Frontier military campaigns' connections and significance for military historians, including the graves or tombs of Major Hugh Rees James, Major Leigh Richmond Battye and Colonel A W Crookshank, as well as others. The Rev. Henry Fisher Corbyn, of the Bengal Ecclesiastical Establishment, who spent long years here as Vicar, and who had previously served in the Andaman and Nicobar Islands, and established a 'charitable home' there at Ross Island (Andaman) is also buried here. Also buried here is Lady Julia Helen Palmer (née Aylmer; died 1896) first wife of General Sir Arthur Power Palmer, a former Commander-in-Chief, India.

== Present status ==
Since Partition and Independence of Pakistan in 1947, the Old Christian Cemetery has suffered considerable neglect, due to various financial constraints upon the Church of Pakistan and maybe around 70–80 of the older graves dating back prior to 1947, still survive and can be properly verified. A family of Muslim caretakers lives within the precincts of the cemetery, who have been traditional caretakers of the site since circa 1902–1903, prior to which time two retired Gurkha soldiers of the 5th Royal Gurkha Rifles used to tend to it, from around the 1870s onwards.

== See also ==
- British Association for Cemeteries in South Asia
- Families in British India Society
- Indian Military Historical Society
- Commonwealth War Graves Commission
