= Abbottabad (disambiguation) =

Abbottabad is a city in Khyber Pakhtunkhwa, Pakistan.

Abbottabad may also refer to:

- Abbottabad Tehsil, administrative subdivision (tehsil) of Abbottabad District, Khyber Pakhtunkhwa, Pakistan
- Abbottabad District, district in Khyber Pakhtunkhwa, Pakistan
- Abbottabad (poem), by Major James Abbott
