= St. Luke's Church, Abbottabad =

Anglican Christian church in Khyber Pakhtunkhwa, Pakistan

St Luke's Church
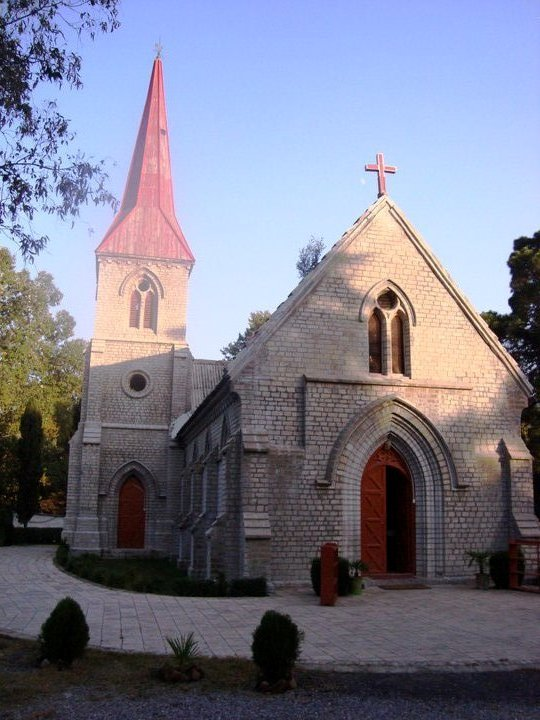
- St Luke's Church
- 34°08′59″N 73°12′48″E
- Location: Abbottabad, Pakistan
- Country: Pakistan
- Denomination: Protestant

History
- Founded: 1864

Administration
- Diocese: Peshawar Diocese of the Church of Pakistan

St Luke's Church, Abbottabad is an Anglican church dedicated to Saint Luke, now under the jurisdiction of the Peshawar Diocese of the Church of Pakistan. It was founded in the town of Abbottabad, British India, in what used to be part of Punjab, later the North West Frontier Province in 1864.

== History ==
The work on the construction of St Luke's commenced in 1854-55, with initial delays due to slow fund-raising and then a brief interruption due to the Indian Rebellion of 1857, and it was completed and then consecrated by the Bishop of Calcutta in 1864. Its jurisdiction covered most of the Hazara region including Abbottabad itself, Haripur, Mansehra and the Galyat hill tracts. The Old Christian Cemetery, Abbottabad, was also attached to it.

Before the foundation of this church, the local Christian community did not have recourse to a regular vicar or chaplain, and these services were provided occasionally by chaplains attached to various military regiments in the cantonment or by officials deputed from time to time from Peshawar or Rawalpindi. From late November 1864, however, the Revd P Kellner was regular Vicar and Chaplain, until April 1866. Thereafter, some other notable Vicars/Chaplains here included the Revd Henry Fisher Corbyn, the Revd James GS Syme and the Revd T Bomford.

== After 1947 ==
From June 1947 to April 1948, as a result of the independence of Pakistan in 1947 disturbances, St Luke's was shut down. Regular services resumed only when the Revd Daniel Rashid, at Peshawar, was given additional visiting charge of Abbottabad and Hazara. He was later replaced by the Revd JH Hewitt in 1951 and then by a local curate, ZK Daniels, who was raised to the Chaplaincy in 1965.

In 1970, the Church of Pakistan was established via a union of Anglicans, Scottish Presbyterians (Church of Scotland), United Methodists and Lutherans and, thereafter, St Luke's was formally placed under its new Peshawar Diocese. Since then, full-time clerics have been appointed regularly to minister to the local congregation.

== See also ==
- James Abbott (Indian Army officer)
- Herbert Benjamin Edwardes
- 5th Royal Gurkha Rifles
- Christianity in India
- Christianity in Pakistan
