= Simla (disambiguation) =

Simla is the former name of Shimla, a city in the Indian state of Himachal Pradesh.

Simla may also refer to:

== Places ==
- Simla district, now Shimla district, a district of Himachal Paradesh around the city
- Simla (Lok Sabha constituency), now Shimla, a parliamentary constituency in Himachal Pradesh
- A name given to the William Beebe Tropical Research Station in Trinidad and Tobago, now operated by the Asa Wright Nature Centre
- Simla, Colorado, a town in Colorado, United States
- An electoral ward in Lautoka, Fiji
- Simla Junction, California, a historic location in Los Altos, California, United States
- Simla, West Bengal, a census town in Hooghly district in the Indian state of
- Shimla Hill, a hill and viewpoint in Abbottabad, Pakistan

== People ==
- Shimla (actress), a Bangladeshi film actress.
