= Harnoi =

Pakistani village

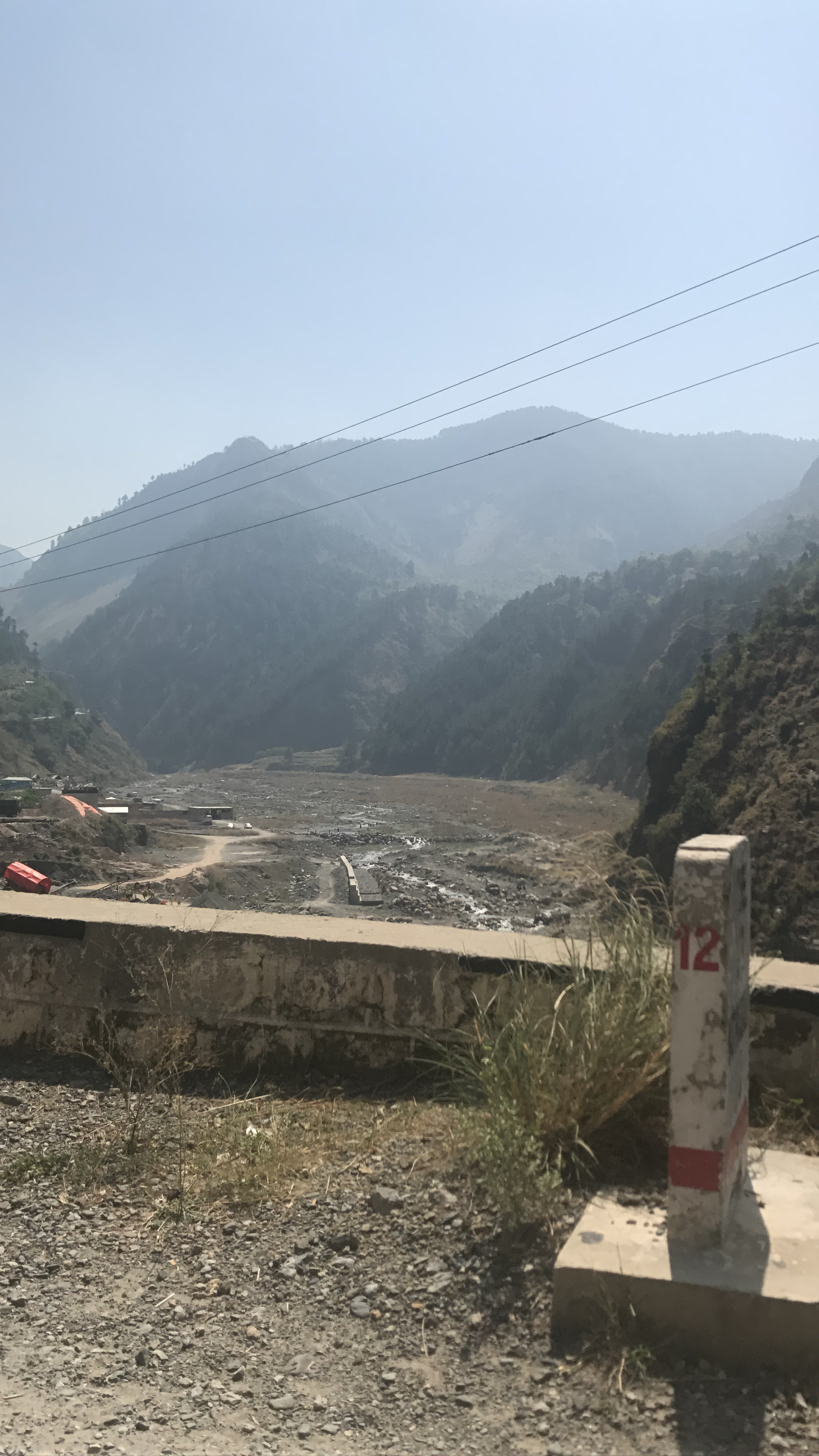

Harnoi is a small town located at the confluence of the Harno and Birengali rivers in Abbottabad District, Khyber Pakhtunkhwa, Pakistan. It is northeast of Abbottabad on the main Nathiagalli road.

A coalfield is situated in the vicinity of the town, where preliminary investigations of the newly discovered Harnoi Coal Field were conducted in 2016.
