= Green Parking Council =

The Green Parking Council (GPC), a nonprofit organization and affiliate of the International Parking Institute provided leadership and oversight for the green conversion of parking facilities to sustainable, environmentally responsible assets. GPC expanded green parking practices and promoted sustainable urban mobility through its Certified Green Garage rating system. The Certified Green Garage rating system was acquired by the U.S. Green Building Council (USGBC) and is administered by the Green Business Certification Inc. (GBCI), the certification arm of the USGBC. Rebranded and launched as the Parksmart rating system, Parksmart is now aligned with the full suite of LEED programs under the USGBC organization.

Formed in 2009, the GPC comprised over 30 partner organizations including commercial property owners, auto manufacturers, parking operators and technology providers. Among these partner organizations are Brookfield Properties, global engineering firm AECOM, Hines Properties, Standard Parking, Propark America and Osram-Sylvania.

== Green Garage Certification ==
Green Garage Certification integrates 50 discrete technologies, programs and management practices into a transformational lever moving the parking industry to sustainability. Developed, tested and endorsed by building owners & managers, parking operators and manufacturers, like a building-specific LEED, it defines the standard for parking sustainability and the goal for parking owners and operators. As of early 2014, Green Garage Certification is in beta-test at 50+ North American sites; it will formally launch its version 1.0 program on June 1, 2014.

The council is the only national body offering sustainability certification to parking facilities. There are 20,000 lots and garages enrolled with the council nationwide — covering more than 4.6 million parking spaces.

== Demonstrator Sites ==
GPC Demonstrator Sites were launched in 2009 as a precursor to Green Garage Certification to bring recognition and marketability to parking facilities deploying green approaches. Demonstrator Sites are offered to GPC Partners for their own or their client’s facilities.

By 2013, 50 facilities across the North American continent were registered as Demonstrator Sites.

== Innovation Salons ==
The Green Parking Council hosts regional Innovation Salons to "address the role of transportation hubs and parking structures as key building blocks for urbanism" and to offer "fresh thinking...thanks to new technology and creative ideas that can both save...money and reduce carbon footprints."

== LEEP Campaign ==
In collaboration with BOMA, IFMA and the United States Department of Energy, the Green Parking Council launched the LEEP - "Lighting Energy Efficiency in Parking" - campaign in 2012. The campaign offers education and technical assistance to parking facility owners and operators to accelerate the adoption of energy efficient lighting in parking lots and structures. The United States Department of Energy through its Better Buildings Alliance estimates that high-performance energy efficient lighting in parking facilities can reduce energy costs by 70% and maintenance expenses by 90%.

== Acquisition by GBCI ==
In 2016, the assets of the Green Parking Council were acquired by Green Building Certification Inc (GBCI), the organization independently recognizing excellence in green business industry performance and practice globally, including the U.S. Green Building Council's (USGBC) LEED certification. The former board of the Green Parking Council became the Sustainable Transportation Advisory Council to GBCI, the Parking Council staff moved over to GBCI and USGBC, and Green Garage Certification was rebranded Parksmart.

== See also ==
- Double parking
