= Pakistan Armed Forces Band =

Pakistan Army's joint staff corps for musics & arts

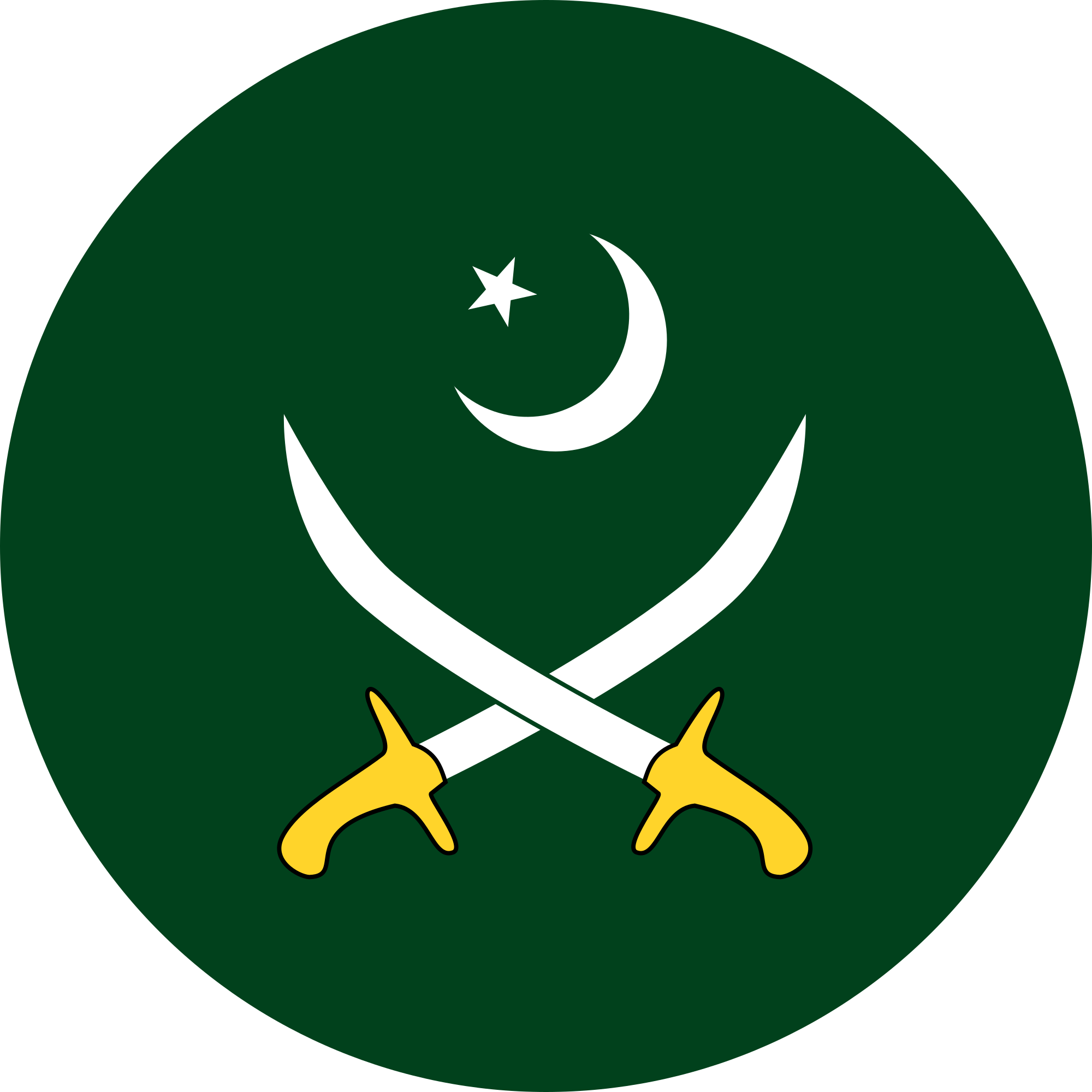
- Badge of Pakistan Army
- Active: 1952; 74 years ago
- Country: Pakistan
- Branch: Pakistan Army: Pakistan Navy; Pakistan Air Force; Pakistan Marines
- Type: Combined and combat service support
- Role: Administrative and staffing oversight.
- Size: Varies due to other branches
- HQ/Garrison: Abbottabad Cantonment in Khyber-Pakhtunkhwa, Pakistan
- Nickname: BAND
- Colors Identification: Red and Black
- Anniversaries: 1952
- Engagements: Military history of Pakistan
- Decorations: Military Decorations of Pakistan military
- Website: School of Music

Commanders
- Director: Maj. Ghulam Ali
- Notable commanders: Lt-Col. Abdul Wahab Khan; Capt. Donald Keeling

Insignia
- War Flag

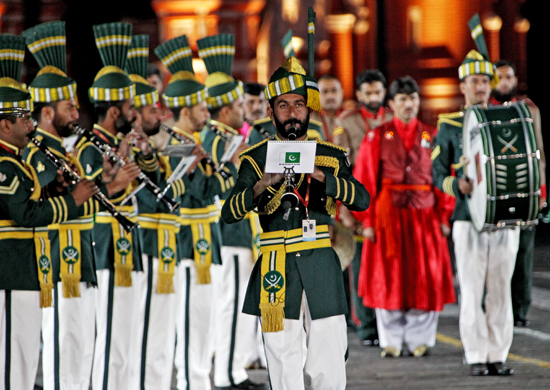
The Pakistan Armed Forces Band in Moscow in 2011.

The Pakistan Armed Forces Band is a joint military administrative and staff service branch of the Pakistan Armed Forces— since it is not restricted to the army but service members of other branches of Pakistan's military are also its part.

The education on music theory and qualification is provided by the Army School of Music, which is headquartered in Abbottabad in Khyber-Pakhtunkhwa, Pakistan.

== Overview ==
In 1952, the British Army's Royal Military School of Music established the Army School of Music in Cherat with Captain Donald Keeling becoming its first director and chief instructor which he remained in this capacity until 1954. The unit was reorganized under British Army's Captain Baker who relocated in Lahore until 1956 when it was shifted to Abbottabad as its current headquarter.

The Pakistan Armed Forces Band is not restricted to the army although the training is provided by the Army School of Music but are drawn from the other branches of the Pakistan Armed Forces. The army graduates lead the formation of the band followed by the navy and air force— they are frequently the center of attention at military ceremonies and military parades in Pakistan. The band's musical traditions are rooted in its connections and heritage from the British Army since army officers from the British Army were its first directors and instructors. The unit is commanded by an officer with the rank of Major who serves as its director.

The band's activities include its participation in the Pakistan Day Parade and the arrival of the state leaders of other nations on invitation by the President of Pakistan. The band has performed in many military festivals around the world, most recently in China and Russia under the banner Pakistan Tri-Services Military Band.

== See also ==
- Central Military Band of the People's Liberation Army of China
- Military Brass Band of the Commandant Regiment of the Ministry of Defense of Tajikistan
- Omani Royal Guard Military Band
