= Frederick Abbott (Indian Army officer) =

British officer in the army of the East India Company

Major-General Sir Frederick Abbott CB
- Major General Sir Frederick Abbott CB by Camille Silvy, 1862.
- Born: 13 June 1805; Little Court, Buntingford, Hertfordshire, England
- Died: 4 November 1892 (aged 87); Branksome Park, Poole, Dorset, England

Major-General Sir Frederick Abbott, CB (13 June 1805 – 4 November 1892) was a British Indian Army officer and engineer of the East India Company.

== Background ==
Frederick was born at Little Court, Buntingford, Hertfordshire, the second son of Henry Alexius Abbott, a retired Calcutta merchant of Blackheath, Kent, and his wife Margaret Welsh, the daughter of William Welsh of Edinburgh. He had the following siblings:

- Margaret (1801–1877)
- Major-General Augustus Abbott (1804–1867)
- General Sir James Abbott, KCB (1807–1896)
- Emma Abbott (1809–1875)
- Major General Saunders Alexius Abbott (1811–1894)
- Keith Edward Abbott, Consul General (1814–1873)
- Edmund Abbott (1816–1816)

== Career ==
After training at Addiscombe Military Seminary from 1820 to 1822, Abbott was posted to India with the Bengal Engineers in 1823. He served in the First Burmese War, and in 1825 distinguished himself in the Battle of Prome, where he was wounded. After serving in different locations in India, he took part as chief engineer in the First Anglo-Afghan War. Here he was ordered to destroy the great bazaar of Kabul as a retribution for the murder of a British officer, an action he later regretted. In 1841, Abbott was appointed superintending engineer of the north-western provinces of Bengal. He fought in the First Anglo-Sikh War in 1846, and took part in the Battle of Sobraon, for which he was awarded a Companion of the Order of the Bath.

He retired one year later and took over as lieutenant-governor of Addiscombe Seminary in 1851. Abbott became a knight bachelor in 1854 and was promoted to major-general in 1858. In 1859, he was appointed to serve on the Royal Commission on the Defence of the United Kingdom, whose recommendations prompted a huge programme of fortification for the British naval dockyards. After the college was closed in 1861, he served on various other royal commissions.

== Family ==
In 1835, he married Frances Cox, da. of Lt.Col. Cox, Royal Artillery, and widow of Lt.Col. Hubert de Burgh. Abbott died in Branksome Park, Poole in 1892. His wife and daughter both predeceased him.
