= Harno River =

Pakistani river

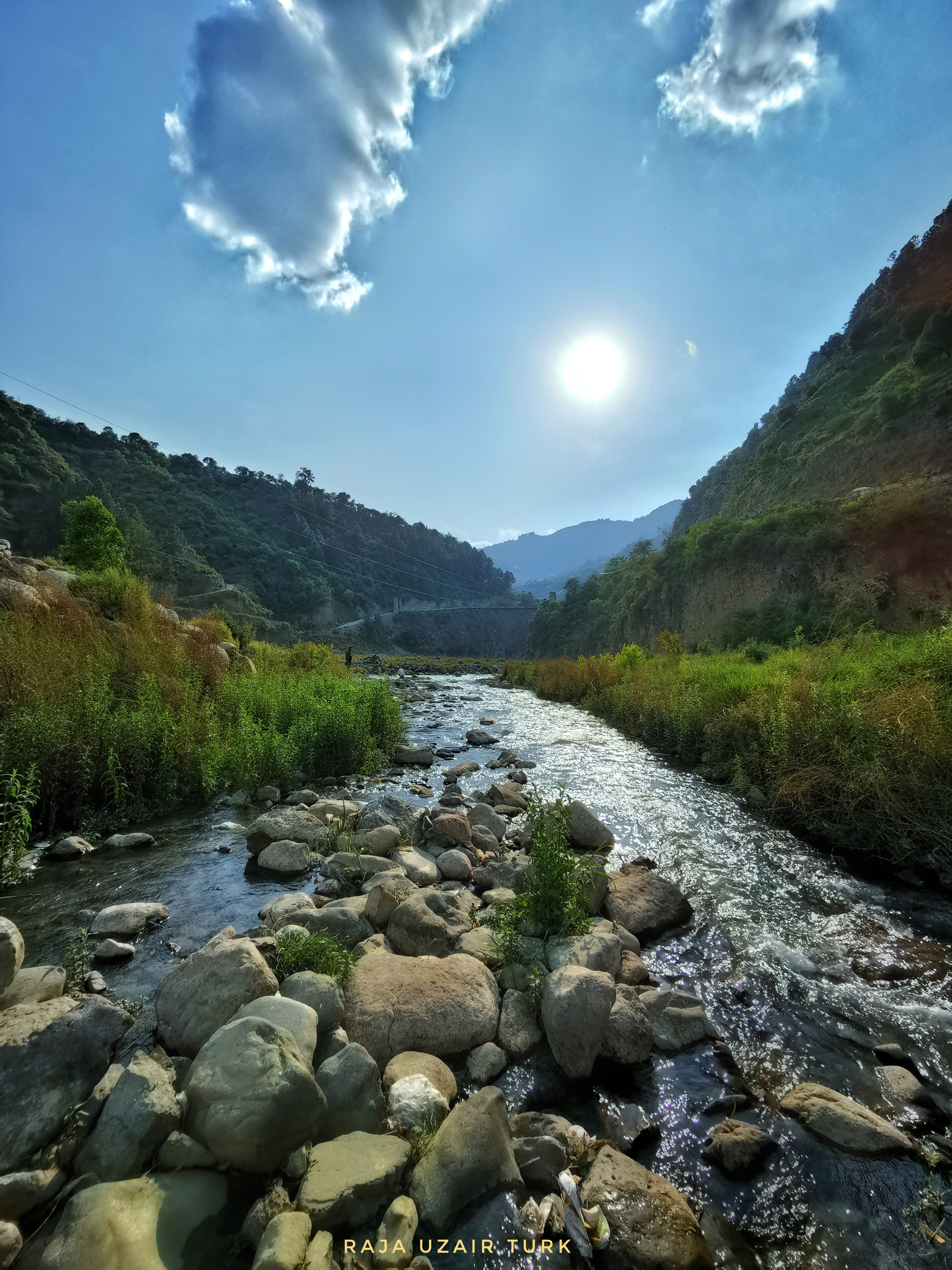

The Harno River, together with the Daur river, is one of the principal watercourses of Abbottabad District in Khyber Pakhtunkhwa, Pakistan.

Illegal construction in and along the river, as well as unauthorised mining on its banks, has disrupted the natural flow of water. In 2025, several structures along the river were demolished during an anti-encroachment operation carried out by the district administration.

Formerly a popular tourist and picnic destination, the area 10 kilometres (6.2 mi) northeast of Abbottabad has faced increasing pollution, leading to the degradation of its natural environment.
