= Ilyasi Masjid =

Mosque in Abbottabad, Pakistan

- الیاسی مسجد
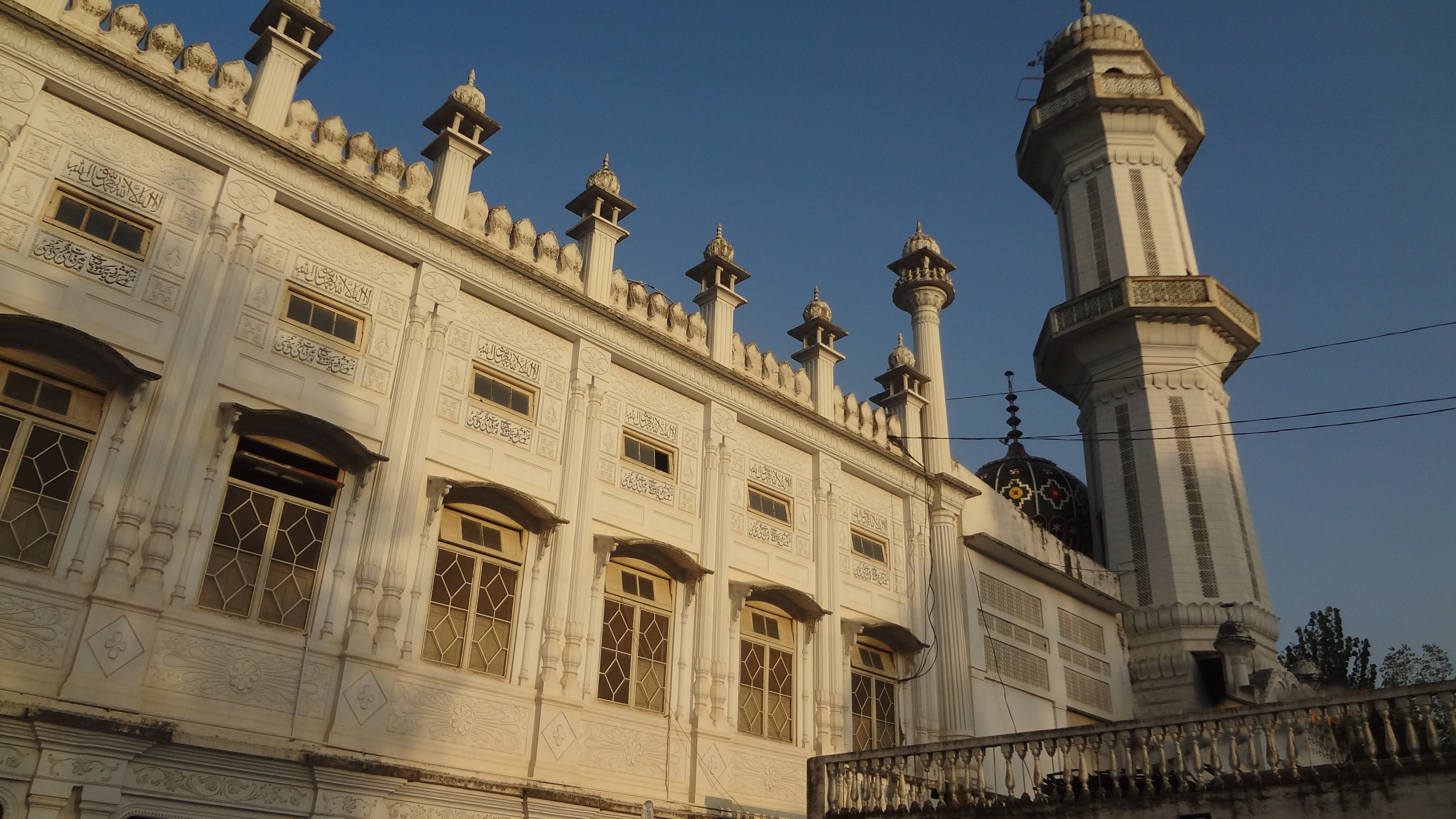
- A view of Ilyasi Masjid in 2015

Religion
- Affiliation: Islam
- Status: Operational

Location
- Location: Abbottabad District, Pakistan
- Country: Pakistan
- Interactive map of Ilyasi Masjid
- Coordinates: 34°10′16.14″N 73°15′31.61″E

Architecture
- Type: Mosque
- Style: Islamic architecture
- Completed: 1932

Ilyasi Masjid (Urdu: الیاسی مسجد) is a mosque located in Abbottabad District, Pakistan.

== History ==
The mosque was built in 1932.

According to research by professors of Bahauddin Zakaria University, this mosque was built in 1932 on top of a stream coming out of the mountain. According to the research paper, it is the oldest and largest mosque in Abbottabad city. According to the mosque administration, there is a capacity of about 10,000 worshippers.
