= Keith Edward Abbott =

British diplomat (1814–1873)

Keith Edward Abbott (1814–1873) was a British diplomat and consul general at Tabriz and later Odessa. He had received the Order of the Lion and the Sun from the Shah of Persia.

== Family background ==
Keith was born in London, the 5th son of Henry Alexius Abbott, a retired Calcutta merchant of Blackheath, Kent, and his wife Margaret Welsh, the daughter of William Welsh of Edinburgh. He had the following siblings:

- Margaret (1801–1877)
- Major General Augustus Abbott, CB (1804–1867).
- Major General Sir Frederick Abbott, CB (1805–1892)
- General Sir James Abbott, KCB (1807–1896)
- Emma Abbott (1809–1875)
- Major General Saunders Alexius Abbott (1811–1894).
- Edmund Abbott (1816-1816)

== Career ==
Between 1835 and 1837, K.E. Abbott stayed in the northeastern Ottoman town of Erzurum, perhaps as assistant in the British Consulate there. He was first appointed to the Consulate of Tehran in 1841, from where he transferred, in 1842, to Tabriz. K. E. Abbott was appointed Consul of Tabriz in April 1854, and remained there till the rupture between England and Persia in 1856, and returned to the same place, as Consul-General, on the renewal of relations with Persia, in July 1857. In July 1868 he became Consul-General of the Russian Ports in the Black Sea and Sea of Azov, residing at Odessa, and remaining there until his death on 28 April 1873. During his service in Iran he produced a series of valuable reports on Iran's economy, commerce and society (see publication list below).

== Publications ==
- 'Notes of a Tour in Armenia in 1837', in: Journal of the Royal Geographical Society of London 12 (1842) pp.207-220 (geographical annotations to this article published by Jelle Verheij )
- Cities and Trade: Consul Abbott on Economy and Society of Iran, 1847-1866. Edited with an introduction by Abbas Amanat (London: Ithaca Press for the Board of the Faculty of Oriental Studies, Oxford University, 1983). ISBN 0863720064.
