= Augustus Abbott =

British army general (1804-1867)

Major-General Augustus Abbott (7 January 1804 – 25 February 1867) was a British army officer. He was the eldest of several prominent brothers. He served in various military campaigns including the First Anglo-Afghan War. He died at Cheltenham, to which he had retired, having been discharged from the army due to poor health.

== Early life ==
Augustus Abbott was born in London and baptised on 10 March 1804 at St Pancras Old Church, the eldest son of Henry Alexius Abbott, a retired merchant of Blackheath, Kent, and his wife Margaret Welsh, the daughter of William Welsh of Edinburgh. He was educated by the Rev. John Faithfull at Warfield, and at Winchester College. At the East India Company's Addiscombe Military Seminary (1818–19) he trained as an officer cadet.

== Military career ==
In 1819, aged 15, Abbott sailed for British India, as second lieutenant, and on 7 August 1821 was promoted to First Lieutenant. By 1835 Abbott had been made captain. He then served with distinction in the First Anglo-Afghan War from 1838 to 1842, playing an important part in the siege of Jalalabad.

Abbott was promoted to major in 1845 and took part in the capture of Peshawar during the closing of the Second Anglo-Sikh War in 1849. During the Rebellion of 1857, he was in Lahore and managed to keep peace in the city. After the rebellion, he was posted to Rawalpindi. In 1859 but he was forced to return home owing to poor health. Later the same year he was promoted to major-general. He died in Cheltenham in 1867.

== Family ==
Abbott had the following notable siblings:

- Major General Sir Frederick Abbott, (1805–1892).
- General Sir James Abbott, (1807–1896).
- Major General Saunders Alexius Abbott (1811–1894).
- Keith Edward Abbott, Consul General (1814–1873).

Abbott married twice. His first marriage was in 1835 to Charlotte Corbyn Becher, daughter of Major Robert Becher and his wife Elizabeth. They had two daughters. Charlotte died in 1839.

In 1843 Abbott married his second wife, Sophia Frances Garstin, daughter of Captain John Garstin. The couple had four daughters and three sons. One of the sons, Col. Henry Alexius Abbott CB (1849–1924), served in the Second Anglo-Afghan War (1878–1881).

== Sources ==
- Abbott, Augustus (1879). Low, Charles Rathbone (ed.). The Afghan War, 1838–1842: from the journal and correspondence of the late Major-General A. Abbott. London: R. Bentley & Son.
- Vibart, H. M. (1894). Addiscombe: its heroes and men of note. Westminster: Archibald Constable. pp. 337–43. OL 23336661M.
