= Saunders Alexius Abbott =

British army general (1811-1894)

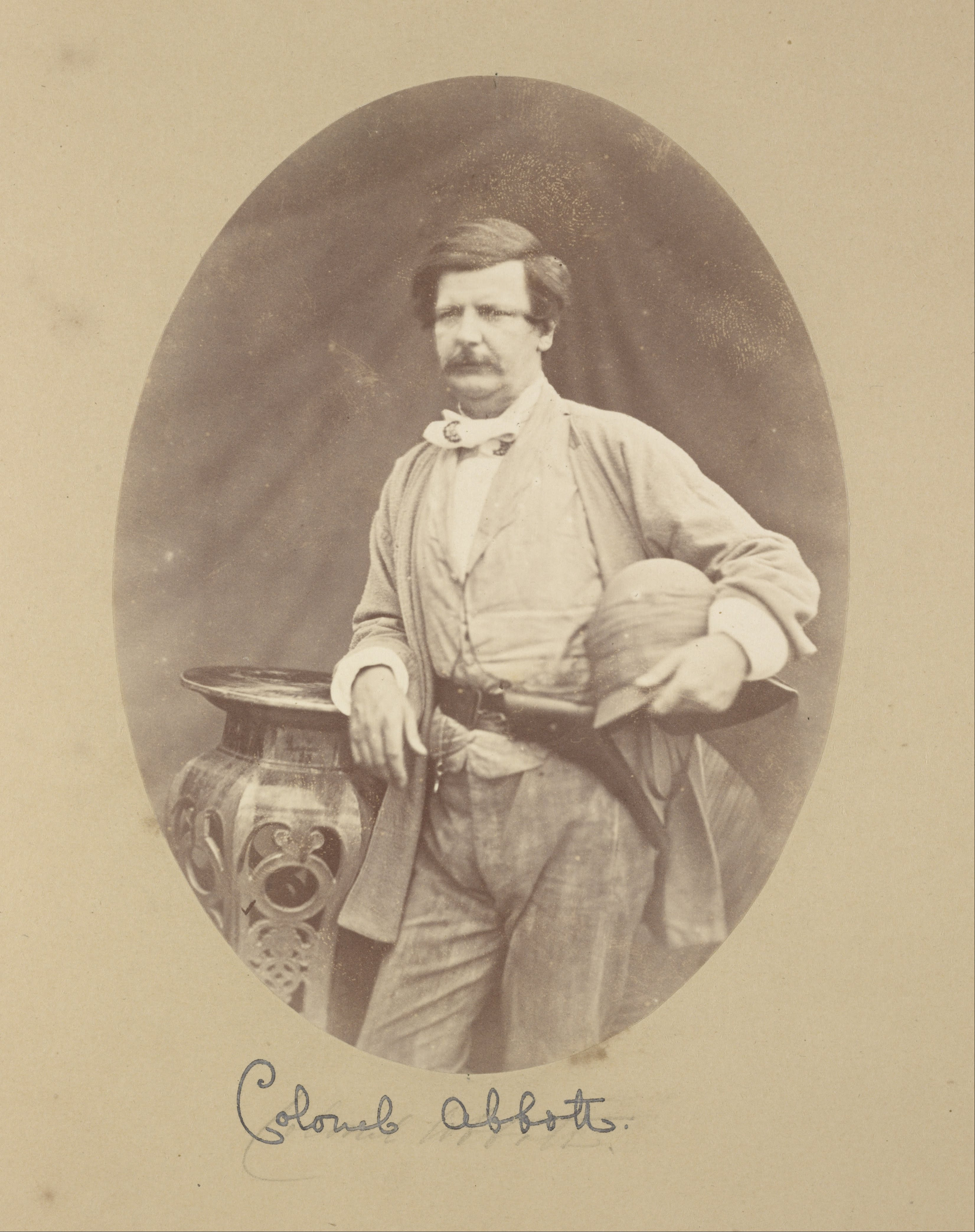
- Photograph by Felice Beato, 1858–1859
- Born: 9 July 1811
- Died: 7 February 1894 (aged 82); Brighton, England, United Kingdom
- Education: Addiscombe Military Seminary
- Relatives: Henry Alexius Abbott and Margaret Welsh
- Military career
- Allegiance: East India Company (British Raj) British India
- Branch: Bengal Army
- Rank: Major-General
- Conflicts: First Anglo-Sikh War
- Other work: Agent for a railway company

Major-General Saunders Alexius Abbott (9 July 1811 – 7 February 1894) was an English military officer in the Bengal Army and administrator serving in British India.

== Family background ==
Saunders was the fourth son of Henry Alexius Abbott, a retired Calcutta merchant of Blackheath, Kent, and his wife Margaret Welsh, the daughter of William Welsh of Edinburgh. He had the following siblings:

- Margaret Abbott (1801–1877)
- Major General Augustus Abbott CB (1804–1867)
- Major General Sir Frederick Abbott CB (1805–1892)
- General Sir James Abbott KCB (1807–1896)
- Emma Abbott (1809–1875)
- Keith Edward Abbott, Consul General (1814–1873)
- Edmund Abbott (1816–1816)

== Career ==
Abbott was educated privately and (like his brothers Augustus and Frederick) at Addiscombe Military Seminary. In 1828, he joined the Bengal Infantry. He was appointed in 1836 to be Assistant in the Revenue Survey under Henry Montgomery Lawrence. He held Survey charges from 1838 to 1842. He fought in the First Anglo-Sikh War of 1845–46. At the Battle of Mudki, he forced marched reserves from Kasauli and Sabathu. He served later as aide-de-camp to Sir Henry Hardinge at the Battle of Ferozeshah, during which he was dangerously wounded. In 1846 he was a brevet-major.

Abbott was appointed Deputy Commissioner of Umbala in 1847. He was appointed to the same post in Hoshiarpur in 1849 to 1854 and held the post during a mutiny. From 1858 to 1863 he was Commissioner of Lucknow. He was an honorary aide-de-camp to the governors-general until his retirement in September 1864.

After his retirement, Abbott became an agent for a railway company in Lahore before being promoted to its board of directors. He died in Brighton on 7 February 1894.

== Sources ==
- Buckland, Charles (1906). Dictionary of Indian Biography. London: Swan Sonnenschein & Co. p. 2.
- Vetch, R. H.; Stearn, Roger T. (reviewer) (2010) [2004]. "Saunders Alexius Abbott (1811–1894) in Abbott, Augustus (1804–1867)". Oxford Dictionary of National Biography (online ed.). Oxford University Press. doi:10.1093/ref:odnb/11. (Subscription, Wikipedia Library access or UK public library membership required.)
