= Abbottabad (poem) =

Poem by James Abbott

"Abbottabad" is a poem by Major James Abbott (1807–1896), who wrote the work about his experience of living in the area before leaving it. He was impressed by the beauty of the area. The Pakistani city Abbottabad, which he founded (then the capital of the Hazara District of British India), is named after him. A plaque commemorating his poem is displayed at Lady Garden Park within the city. The poem has been criticised as being poorly written, in the manner of William McGonagall's substandard verse.

== Poem text ==
I remember the day when I first came here
And smelt the sweet Abbottabad's air
The trees and the ground covered with snow
Gave us indeed a brilliant show
To me the place seemed like a dream
And far ran a lonesome stream
The wind hissed as if welcoming us
The pine swayed creating a lot of fuss
And the tiny cuckoo sang it away
A song very melodious and gay
I adored the place from the first sight
And was happy that my coming here was right
And eight good years here passed very soon
And we leave you perhaps on a sunny noon
Oh Abbottabad we are leaving you now
To your natural beauty do I bow
Perhaps your winds sound will never reach my ear
My gift for you is few sad tears
I bid you farewell with a heavy heart
Never from my mind will your memories thwart

== Criticism ==
An article by Stephen Moss of the Guardian newspaper refers to the poem as "one of the worst poems ever written". Moss speculates that the poem may sound better in Urdu and he did not read a translation. Moss also states that the version he read includes "oddly garbled" phrases which indicate it may be a badly translated form of the original.
