= Abbottabad Cantonment =

- Cantonment
- Location within Khyber Pakhtunkhwa Location within Pakistan
- Coordinates: 34°8′54″N 73°12′44″E
- Country: Pakistan
- Province: Khyber Pakhtunkhwa
- District: Abbottabad
- Tehsil: Abbottabad

Population (2017)
  - Total: 138,311
- Website: cbabbottabad.gov.pk

Abbottabad Cantonment is a cantonment adjacent to the city of Abbottabad in Khyber Pakhtunkhwa, Pakistan. The Pakistan Military Academy is located at Kakul, which is adjacent to the Abbottabad Cantonment.

It has an area of 6936.21 acres, which is governed by Cantonment Board of Abbottabad.

== History ==
During the development of area, different species of trees and flowers were used, including ash, chinars, elm, fragrant camphor, Himalayan and Lebanese cedars, magnificent horse chestnut trees, pines, and mahogany.

It has been noticed that the cantonment board is slowly demolishing British-era buildings and structures including demolition of the office of Major Abbott, after whom the city is named.
