= Shimla Hill =

Hill and urban park in Abbottabad, Pakistan

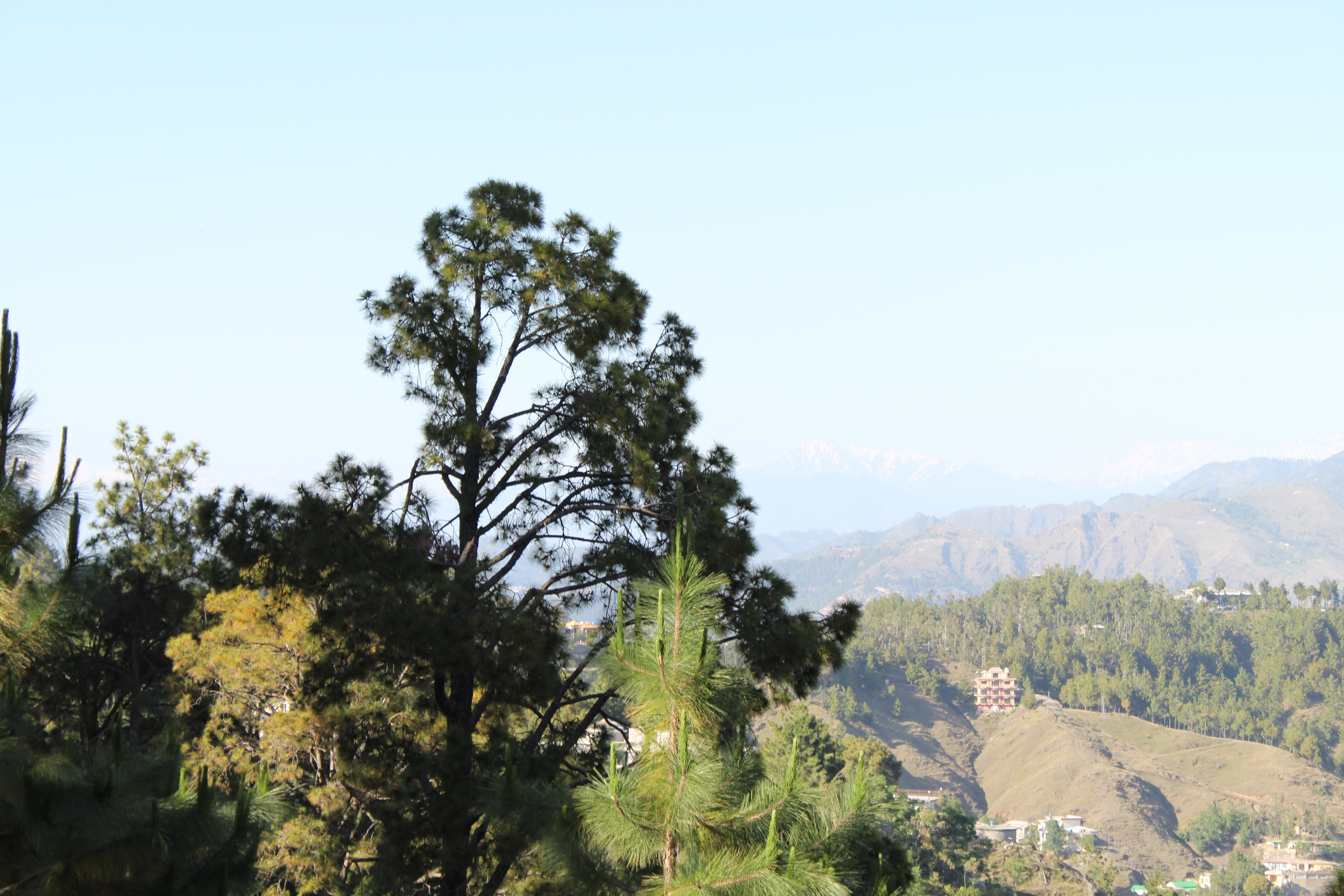
- View from Shimla Hill

Highest point
- Coordinates: 34.1587742°N 73.1945904°E

Geography
- Location: Abbottabad, Khyber Pakhtunkhwa, Pakistan

Shimla Hill, also known as Shimla Pahari, is a hill, viewpoint and urban green space in Abbottabad, Khyber Pakhtunkhwa, Pakistan. The Abbottabad district administration lists Shimla Hill among attractions in the district and gives the distance from Abbottabad to Shimla Hill as 2.3 km (1.4 mi). The Pakistan Tourism Development Corporation's Galyat brochure describes Shimla Hill as being in the middle of Abbottabad city and as a viewpoint over Abbottabad valley.

== Tourism and recreation ==
The Khyber Pakhtunkhwa Culture and Tourism Authority lists the Shimla Hill viewpoint among places worth visiting in and around Abbottabad. The hill is used as a local viewpoint and recreational area because of its position above the city.

== Redevelopment ==
A 2025 report by the International Institute for Sustainable Development described a redevelopment project for Shimla Hill Park under the name Sherwan Hill Adventure Park. The report listed proposed works including expansion of green areas, reforestation, walking trails, access ramps and street lighting.

The report also identified urban growth, pressure on transport and water infrastructure, loss of green space, urban heat, air quality, flooding and landslides as issues affecting Abbottabad. It presented the Shimla Hill Park project as part of wider planning for urban green space in the city.

== See also ==
- Abbottabad
- Galyat
