= Abbottabad =

City in Khyber Pakhtunkhwa, Pakistan

Abbottabad ایبٹ آباد
- City
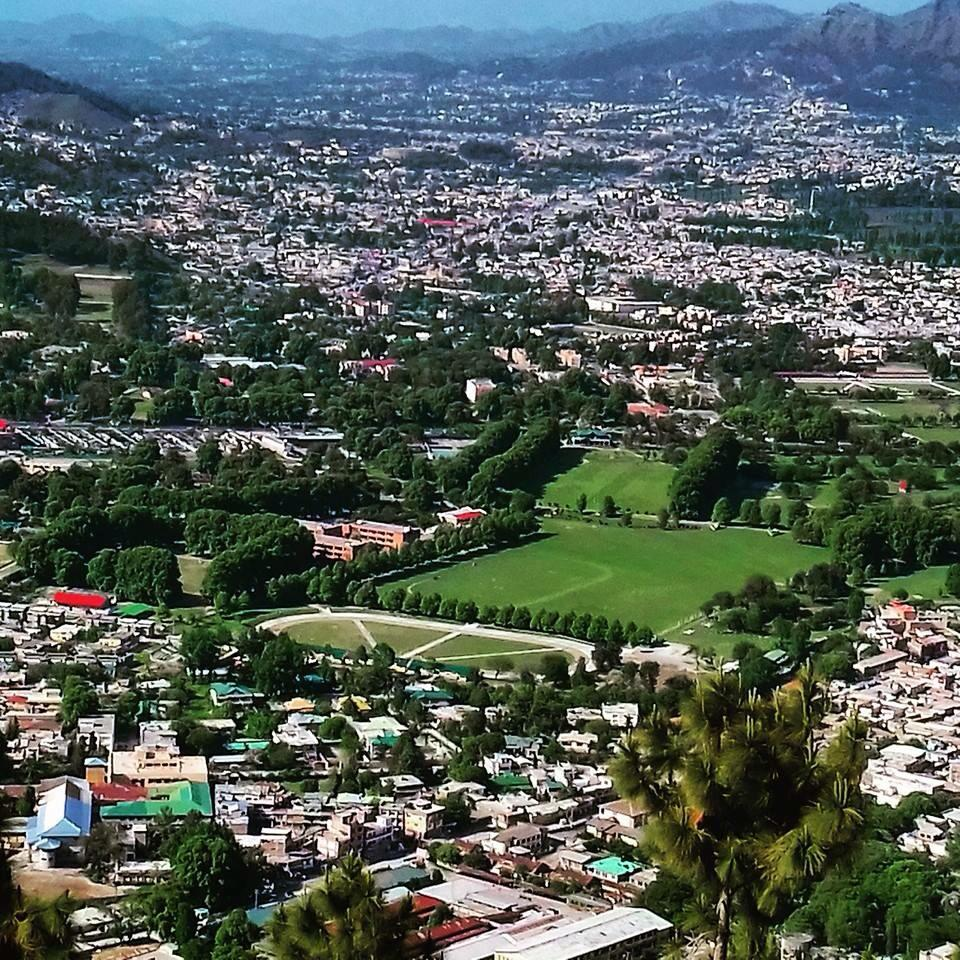
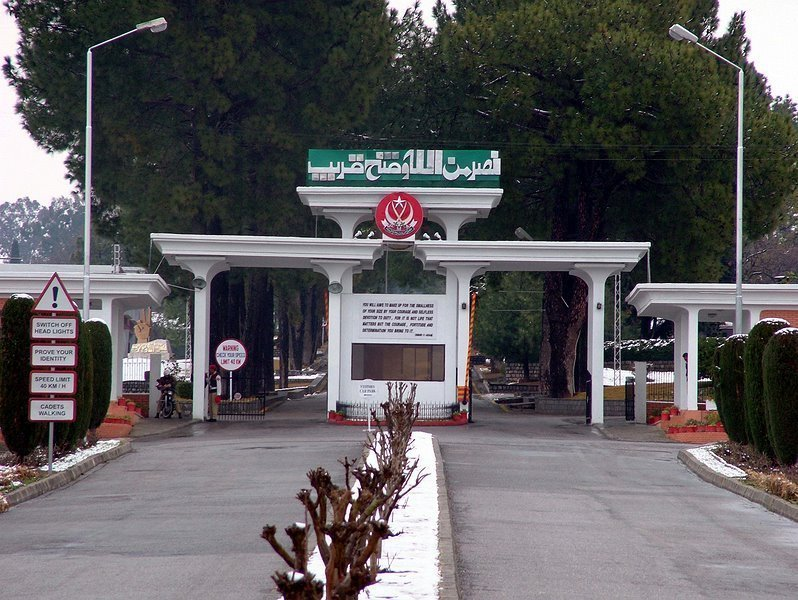
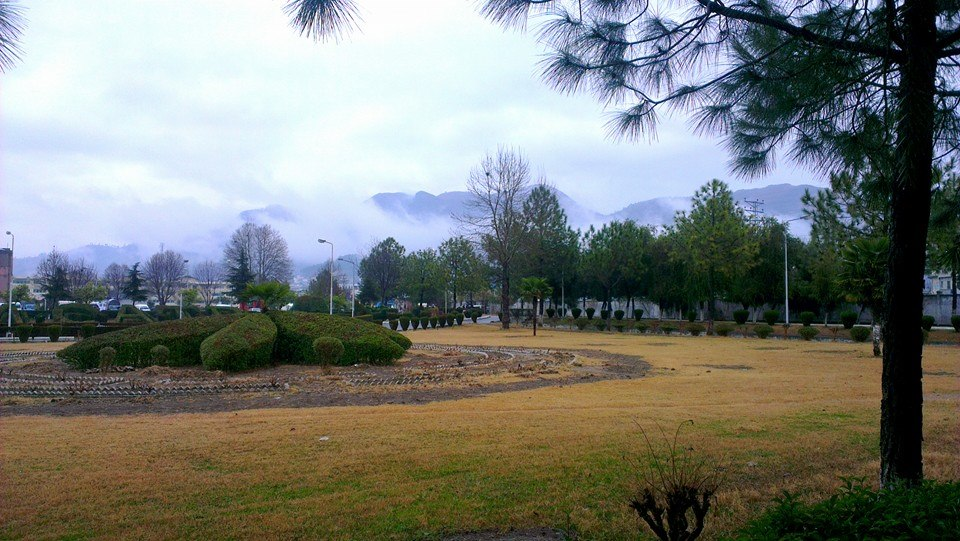
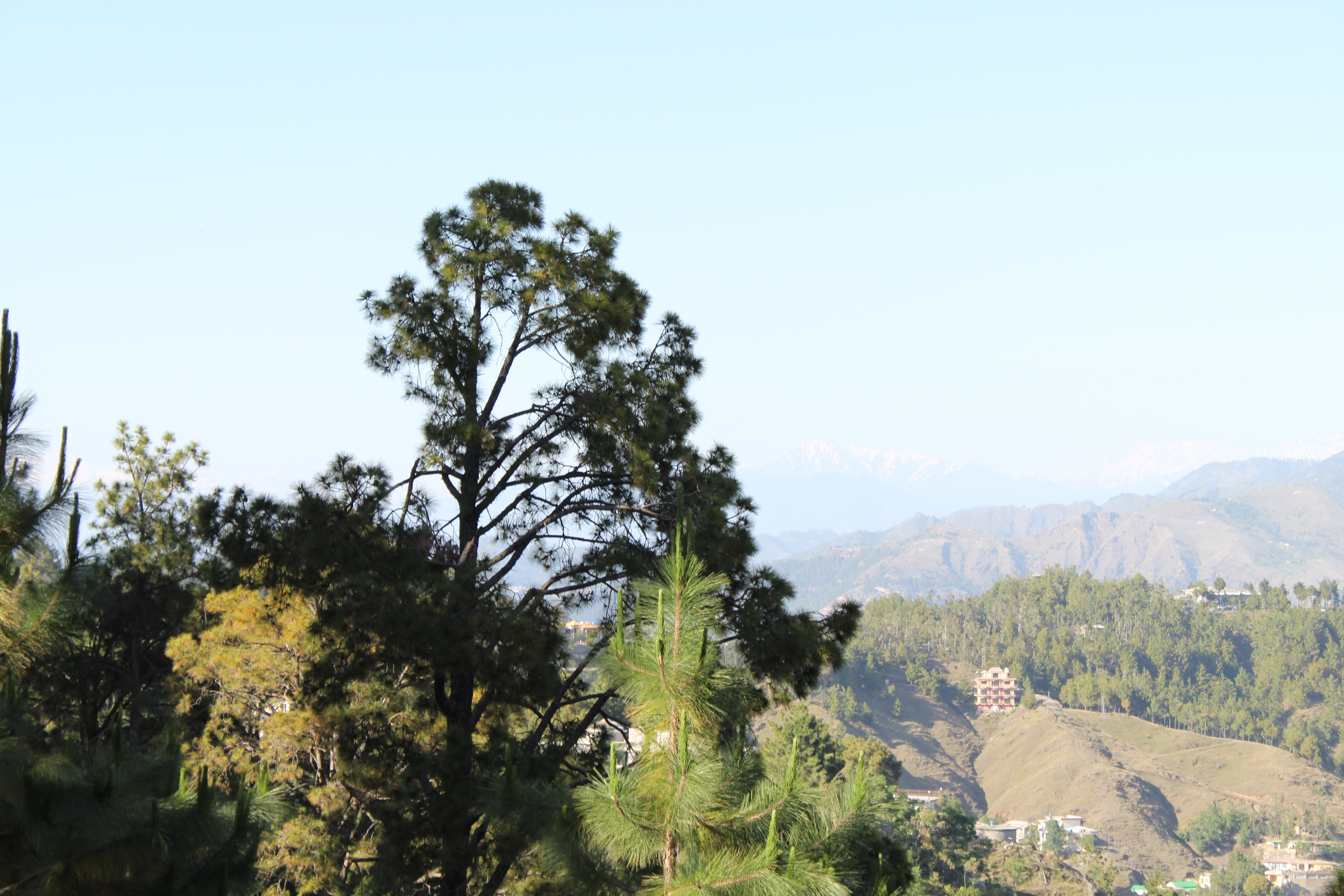
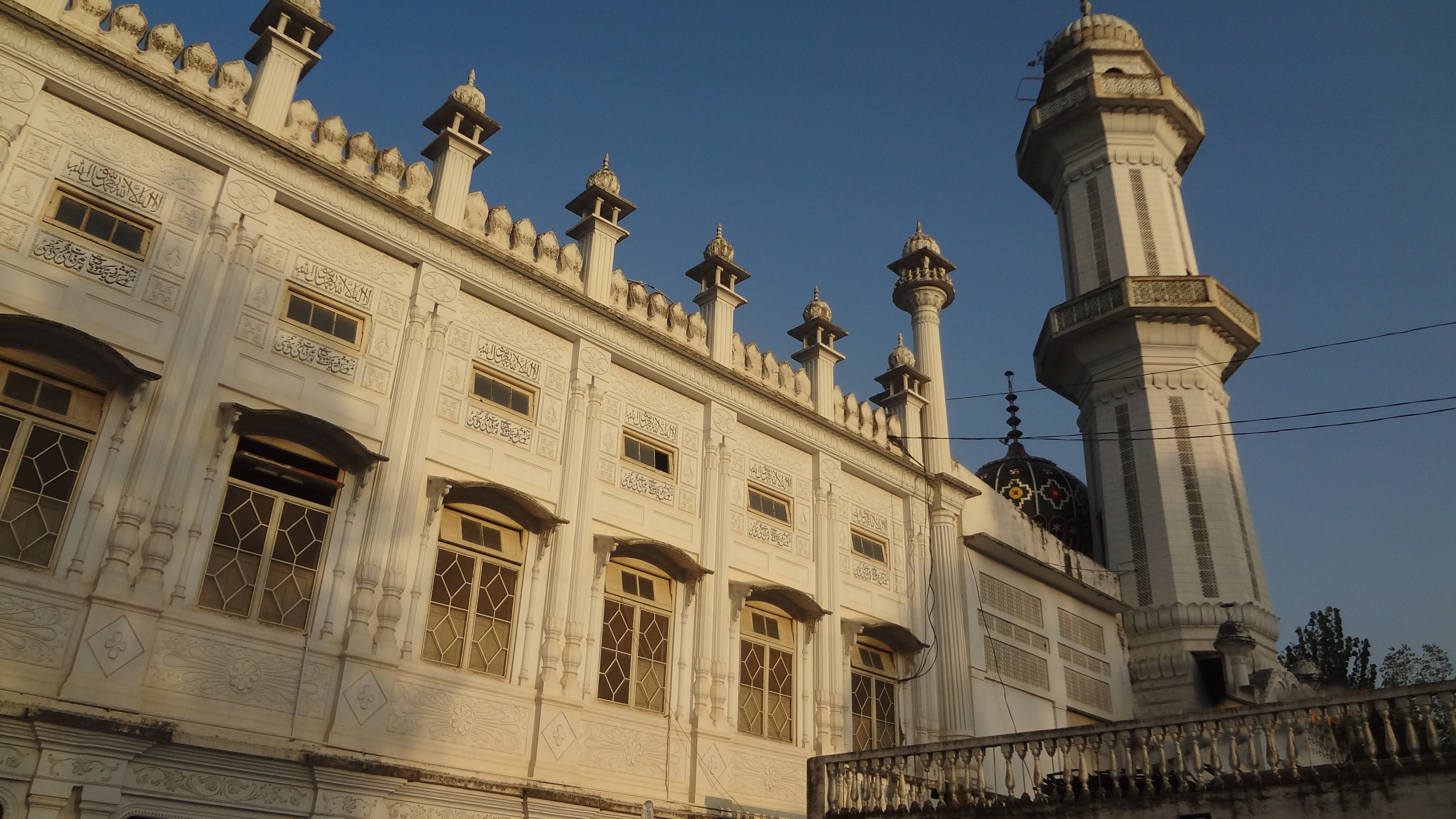
- View of Abbottabad PMA Ayub Medical College Shimla Hill Ilyasi Masjid From top: Abbottabad city view; Pakistan Military Academy and Ayub Medical College; Shimla Hill and Ilyasi Masjid

- Location within Khyber Pakhtunkhwa Location within Pakistan Location within Asia
- Coordinates: 34°9′21″N 73°13′10″E
- Country: Pakistan
- Province: Khyber Pakhtunkhwa
- Division: Hazara
- District: Abbottabad
- Tehsil: Abbottabad
- Founded: 1853
- Founder: James Abbott
- Named for: James Abbott

Government
  - Body: District Government
  - Mayor: Shuja Nabi (PTI)
  - Deputy Commissioner: Capt. (R) Sarmad Saleem Ikram
- Elevation: 1,256 m (4,121 ft)

Population (2023)
  - City: 234,395
  - Rank: 42nd in Pakistan; 5th in Khyber Pakhtunkhwa
- Abbottabad Cantonment: 159,683; Abbottabad Municipal Committee: 74,712
- Demonym: Abbottabadi
- Time zone: UTC+5 (PKT)
- Calling code: 0992
- HDI (2024): 0.800 (very high)
- Website: abbotabad.kp.gov.pk

Abbottabad (Note: /ˈæbətəbɑːd/ AB-ə-tə-bahd; Urdu and Hindko: ایبٹ آباد, romanised: aibṭabād, pronounced [ɛːbʈəˈbaːd]) is a city and the capital of the Hazara Division in the Pakistani province of Khyber Pakhtunkhwa. It also serves as the headquarters of its eponymous tehsil (subdistrict) and district. According to the 2023 census, Abbottabad had a population of 234,395. The city is located about 120 km (75 mi) north of the Islamabad–Rawalpindi area and 150 km (95 mi) east of Peshawar, at an elevation of about 1,256 m (4,121 ft).

Abbottabad was founded in 1853 during British rule and was named after James Abbott, the first deputy commissioner of Hazara. It developed as a cantonment and administrative centre in the colonial period, later becoming part of the North-West Frontier Province and then Khyber Pakhtunkhwa. Parts of the city are administered as Abbottabad Cantonment, while the wider urban area also includes municipal administration.

The city is associated with education, healthcare, tourism and military institutions. It is home to institutions such as Ayub Medical College and the Abbottabad campus of COMSATS University Islamabad, while the Pakistan Military Academy is located at nearby Kakul. Abbottabad also serves as a market and transit centre for surrounding areas of the Hazara region and as a base for travel to nearby hill stations and destinations in northern Pakistan, including the Galyat region and the Kaghan Valley.

== Etymology ==
The name Abbottabad combines the name of the city's founder, James Abbott, with the Persian-derived suffix ābād, meaning an inhabited place, settlement or town. The name therefore means "Abbott's town". Abbottabad is one of two Pakistani cities commonly cited as being named after British army officers, the other being Jacobabad.

== History ==
=== Early history and founding ===
Before the colonial era, the area now occupied by Abbottabad formed part of rural Hazara. From the mid-18th to the early 19th centuries, the area was under the Durrani Empire, and it came under the Sikh Empire in 1820 when the region was conquered by forces led by Hari Singh Nalwa. Haripur, founded by Nalwa in 1822, became the capital of Hazara before the establishment of Abbottabad.

Following the Second Anglo-Sikh War, the East India Company annexed the Punjab region up to Peshawar. James Abbott, a British officer in the Bengal Army, served as deputy commissioner of Hazara from 1847 to 1853. In January 1853, during his tenure, Abbott founded the town that became Abbottabad. The name, meaning Abbott's town, was adopted at the suggestion of Herbert Edwardes, another East India Company officer and administrator.

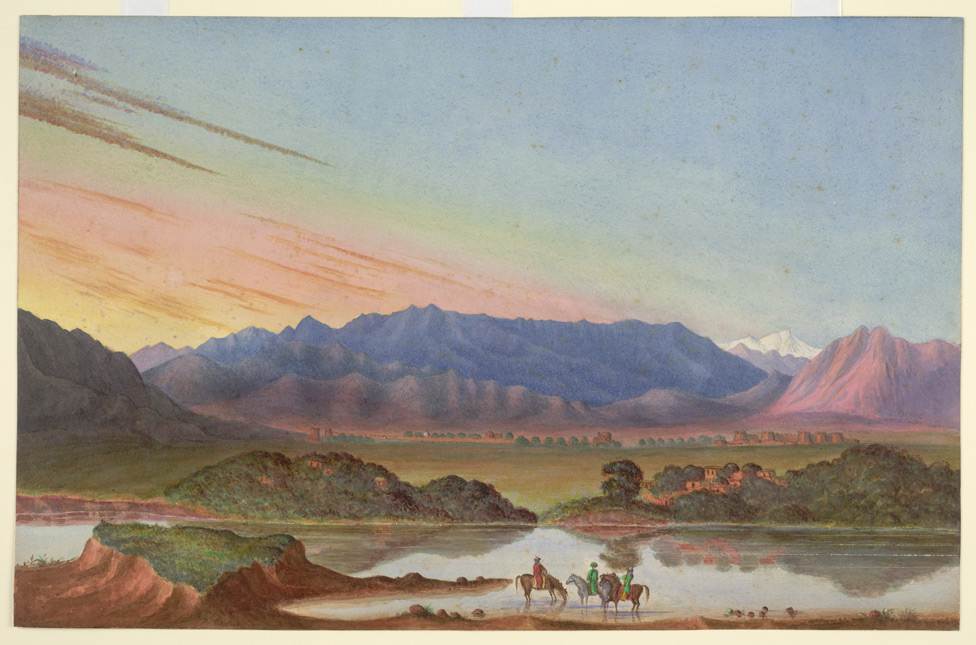
The Rock Aornos from Huzara, drawn by James Abbott in 1850

Abbottabad replaced Haripur as the headquarters of Hazara District and developed as an administrative and military centre. During this period, Hazara and much of what is now Khyber Pakhtunkhwa formed part of British India's Punjab Province. Abbott later wrote the poem Abbottabad, which expressed his attachment to the town before his departure from India. A marble version of the poem is displayed in Lady Garden Park.

=== British period ===
After the Indian Rebellion of 1857, the province passed from East India Company rule to the direct rule of the British Crown, and Abbottabad remained a military cantonment. During the rebellion, the 4th Sikhs, who had been stationed at Abbottabad, marched towards Ludhiana to prevent rebels from Jullundur crossing the Sutlej. In 1867, following conflict in the Black Mountain area, the Khan of Agror was taken into British custody and sent to Abbottabad.

The town and cantonment grew during the later 19th century. The 1881 census recorded a population of 4,189 people living in 918 houses, with about two-thirds of the population in the cantonment and about one-third in the civil station. Abbottabad also served as a base for military activity connected with the Black Mountain expeditions of 1888 and 1891.

On 9 November 1901, Lord Curzon, the British governor-general of India, established the North-West Frontier Province from the north-western districts of the Punjab, making Abbottabad part of the new province. In the early 20th century, Abbottabad was a military cantonment and sanatorium, and served as the headquarters of a brigade in the Second Division of the Northern Army Corps. The garrison included Frontier Force infantry, Gurkha battalions and mountain batteries.

In 1901, the population of Abbottabad town and cantonment was 7,764. It rose to 11,506 by 1911. Public institutions recorded in the early 20th century included Anglo-Vernacular schools and a government dispensary. On 24 August 1945, Jawaharlal Nehru, later the first prime minister of India, addressed a public meeting in Abbottabad after hearing of the death of Subhas Chandra Bose.

=== Post-independence ===
Before the partition of British India, a referendum was held in the North-West Frontier Province to decide whether the province would join India or Pakistan; the result was in favour of joining Pakistan. After independence in 1947, the Pakistan Military Academy was established at Kakul, near Abbottabad, for the training of Pakistan Army officers. In June 1948, the British Red Cross opened a hospital in Abbottabad to treat people injured during the conflict in Kashmir.

In 1955, Abbottabad and the rest of the North-West Frontier Province became part of West Pakistan under the One Unit Scheme. The province was restored in 1970 under the Legal Framework Order, 1970, and Hazara later became a division with Abbottabad as its headquarters. The North-West Frontier Province was renamed Khyber Pakhtunkhwa in 2010 after the Eighteenth Amendment to the Constitution of Pakistan.

=== Recent history ===
Abbottabad was affected by the 2005 Kashmir earthquake. Most of the city survived, but many older buildings were destroyed or damaged, and the city received people displaced from Azad Kashmir after the earthquake. In 2009 and 2010, Abbottabad also received internally displaced people from Swat District and Waziristan during military operations against militants.

On 25 January 2011, Indonesian militant Umar Patek, a member of Jemaah Islamiyah, was arrested in Abbottabad. He was wanted in connection with the Christmas Eve 2000 Indonesia bombings and the 2002 Bali bombings.

On 2 May 2011, Abbottabad gained international attention when United States forces killed Osama bin Laden in his compound in the city during the Abbottabad raid. Pakistani authorities demolished the compound in February 2012.

== Demographics ==
Population According to the 2023 census, Abbottabad had a population of 234,395, consisting of 159,683 people in Abbottabad Cantonment and 74,712 people in Abbottabad Municipal Committee. The same census listed Nawan Shehr and Murree Gallies Cantonment as separate urban localities in Abbottabad District.

Historical census figures show growth from 4,189 people in 1881. The population decreased between 1891 and 1901, and increased notably by 1941 during World War II. Historical figures are affected by changes in administrative boundaries and census definitions.

Historical population

Year	Pop.	±% p.a.
1881	4,189	—
1891	10,163	+9.27%
1901	7,764	−2.66%
1911	11,506	+4.01%
1921	13,620	+1.70%
1931	16,165	+1.73%
1941	27,424	+5.43%

Year	Pop.	±% p.a.
1951	27,602	+0.06%
1961	31,036	+1.18%
1972	46,719	+3.79%
1981	65,996	+3.91%
1998	106,101	+2.83%
2017	207,989	+3.61%
2023	234,395	+2.01%

=== Religion ===
The 2023 census religion tables are published by district, tehsil and rural–urban classification rather than by each individual urban locality. In urban Abbottabad Tehsil, Islam was the largest reported religion in 2023, followed by Christianity.

Religious groups in Abbottabad City (1881−2023)
Religious group	1881		1891		1901		1911		1921		1931		1941		1951		2017		2023	
Religious group	Pop.	%	Pop.	%	Pop.	%	Pop.	%	Pop.	%	Pop.	%	Pop.	%	Pop.	%	Pop.	%	Pop.	%
Hinduism (Note: 1931-1941: Including Ad-Dharmis)	2,151	51.35%	5,170	50.87%	4,438	57.16%	6,828	59.34%	7,346	53.94%	7,753	47.96%	11,886	43.34%	2	0.01%	57	0.02%	50	0.02%
Islam (Note: 1951: Including 3,316 Muhajirs.)	1,649	39.37%	3,298	32.45%	2,904	37.4%	3,729	32.41%	5,007	36.76%	7,026	43.46%	12,192	44.46%	27,488	99.59%	243,665	99.18%	252,038	99.03%
Sikhism	306	7.3%	1,504	14.8%	329	4.24%	785	6.82%	879	6.45%	1,039	6.43%	2,680	9.77%	—N/a	—N/a	—N/a	—N/a	18	0.01%
Christianity	—N/a	—N/a	188	1.85%	93	1.2%	164	1.43%	388	2.85%	346	2.14%	298	1.09%	—N/a	—N/a	1,811	0.74%	2,370	0.93%
Jainism	0	0%	3	0.03%	0	0%	0	0%	0	0%	0	0%	—N/a	—N/a	—N/a	—N/a	—N/a	—N/a	—N/a	—N/a
Zoroastrianism	—N/a	—N/a	0	0%	0	0%	0	0%	0	0%	1	0.01%	0	0%	—N/a	—N/a	—N/a	—N/a	2	0%
Ahmadiyya	—N/a	—N/a	—N/a	—N/a	—N/a	—N/a	—N/a	—N/a	—N/a	—N/a	—N/a	—N/a	—N/a	—N/a	—N/a	—N/a	45	0.02%	6	0%
Others	83	1.98%	0	0%	0	0%	0	0%	0	0%	0	0%	368	1.34%	112	0.41%	92	0.04%	34	0.01%
Total population	4,189	100%	10,163	100%	7,764	100%	11,506	100%	13,620	100%	16,165	100%	27,424	100%	27,602	100%	245,670	100%	254,518	100%
1881-1951: Data for the entirety of the town of Abbottabad, which included Abbottabad Municipality and Abbottabad Cantonment. 2017–2023: Urban population of Abbottabad Tehsil.

=== Languages ===
Mother tongues in urban Abbottabad Tehsil, 2023
1. Hindko (75.4%)
2. Pashto (14.1%)
3. Urdu (5.28%)
4. Punjabi (2.60%)
5. Kohistani (0.86%)
6. Others (1.79%)

According to the 2023 census, Hindko was the most commonly reported mother tongue in urban Abbottabad Tehsil, spoken by 75.39% of the population. Pashto was reported by 14.08%, Urdu by 5.28%, Punjabi by 2.60%, Kohistani by 0.86% and other languages of Pakistan by 1.79%.

== Geography ==
Abbottabad is located in the Hazara Division of Khyber Pakhtunkhwa, northern Pakistan. The city lies north of the Islamabad–Rawalpindi metropolitan area and east of Peshawar, in the hill country between the plains of the Indus River and the mountain routes leading towards northern Pakistan and Kashmir. It is situated at an elevation of about 1,256 m (4,121 ft) on a plateau at the southern end of the Rash, or Orash, Plain.

A 2024 sustainable mobility study described Abbottabad as lying in the Orash Valley at about 1,250 m (4,100 ft) above sea level, in the foothills of the Hindu Kush and Karakoram ranges. The city lies on road routes connecting the plains of the Indus River, the Kashmir region and northern Pakistan. Havelian, about 16 km (9.9 mi) south of Abbottabad, is the nearest railhead.

The surrounding district contains mountainous and forested terrain. A 2004 strategy prepared by IUCN Pakistan and the Government of the North-West Frontier Province reported that forests covered about 20% of Abbottabad District and accounted for 5.4% of the province's forest resources, although the district made up 1.8% of the province's land area. The same strategy identified soil erosion and watershed management as environmental concerns in the district, and recorded seven sub-watersheds, of which three were then covered by regular watershed programmes. These figures refer to Abbottabad District rather than only the municipal city.

=== Climate ===
Abbottabad has a humid subtropical climate under the Köppen climate classification. Climate-Data.org gives Abbottabad an average annual temperature of 15.9 °C (60.6 °F) and average annual rainfall of 1,532 mm (60.3 in). Average temperatures are lowest in January and highest in June. Rainfall occurs throughout the year, with the highest monthly totals in July and August during the summer monsoon period.

Climate data for Abbottabad
Month	Jan	Feb	Mar	Apr	May	Jun	Jul	Aug	Sep	Oct	Nov	Dec	Year
Mean daily maximum °C (°F)	11.6 (52.9)	13.0 (55.4)	17.9 (64.2)	22.9 (73.2)	27.8 (82.0)	29.9 (85.8)	27.9 (82.2)	26.8 (80.2)	26.1 (79.0)	23.1 (73.6)	18.2 (64.8)	14.4 (57.9)	21.6 (70.9)
Daily mean °C (°F)	5.3 (41.5)	7.1 (44.8)	11.8 (53.2)	16.8 (62.2)	21.4 (70.5)	24.2 (75.6)	23.9 (75.0)	23.0 (73.4)	21.2 (70.2)	17.0 (62.6)	11.8 (53.2)	7.5 (45.5)	15.9 (60.6)
Mean daily minimum °C (°F)	−1.3 (29.7)	0.4 (32.7)	4.4 (39.9)	9.0 (48.2)	13.4 (56.1)	17.2 (63.0)	19.5 (67.1)	18.8 (65.8)	15.6 (60.1)	10.2 (50.4)	4.8 (40.6)	0.3 (32.5)	9.4 (48.8)
Average rainfall mm (inches)	109 (4.3)	185 (7.3)	209 (8.2)	149 (5.9)	91 (3.6)	95 (3.7)	237 (9.3)	201 (7.9)	96 (3.8)	47 (1.9)	47 (1.9)	66 (2.6)	1,532 (60.4)
Source: Climate-Data.org

== Economy ==
Abbottabad functions as a market centre for Abbottabad District. Its local economy is closely linked with services, education, tourism and its role as an administrative centre. At the district level, the Khyber Pakhtunkhwa Board of Investment and Trade identifies hospitality and tourism, education, mining and mineral development as sectors in which Abbottabad District has comparative advantages.

Tourism forms an important part of the local economy. A working paper by the Pakistan Institute of Development Economics described tourism as a major component of Abbottabad city's economy and noted that the city also serves as a transit point for other destinations in northern Pakistan. The same study reported that tourism-related activity was associated with local pressures including traffic congestion, price fluctuations, littering and noise pollution.

In the wider district, economic activity includes subsistence agriculture, livestock and poultry rearing, forestry-related livelihoods, mining and small-scale industry. A fact sheet prepared in connection with IUCN's environmental fiscal reform work in Abbottabad described subsistence agriculture as the mainstay of the district economy, with additional household income from backyard poultry and livestock rearing. The same source stated that mining in the district was limited, despite identified mineral deposits, and was mainly dominated by soapstone and limestone. These descriptions refer to Abbottabad District rather than only the municipal city.

== Government and administration ==
Abbottabad is the administrative centre of Abbottabad District and hosts several divisional and district offices. The district administration lists the offices of the Commissioner of Hazara Division, the Deputy Inspector General of Hazara Division, the Station Commander, the Military Estate Officer, the Deputy Commissioner of Abbottabad and the District Police Officer among government offices working in the district.

District administration in Abbottabad is organised under the Khyber Pakhtunkhwa local government framework. According to an audit report by the Auditor General of Pakistan, district government activities are managed through the office of the Deputy Commissioner and district officers, including officers for education, health, agriculture, fisheries, population welfare, sports, livestock and dairy development, cooperation and social welfare.

Abbottabad District is divided into four tehsils: Abbottabad, Havelian, Lower Tanawal and Lora. Tehsil municipal administrations are managed by tehsil municipal officers, assisted by officers for finance, regulation and infrastructure. Their functions include preparing local development plans, managing municipal services and infrastructure, exercising control over land use and zoning, regulating markets and services, issuing licences and permits, collecting local taxes and organising cultural and recreational events.

Parts of Abbottabad are administered separately as Abbottabad Cantonment. The 2023 census counted Abbottabad Cantonment and Abbottabad Municipal Committee as separate urban localities. Cantonments in Pakistan are administered under the cantonment system; the Cantonments Act, 1924 provides for a cantonment board and an executive officer for every cantonment.

Municipal water and sanitation services are also handled through a separate public service company. A performance audit report by the Auditor General of Pakistan states that the Water and Sanitation Services Company Abbottabad was established by the Government of Khyber Pakhtunkhwa in April 2017, with water supply functions transferred from tehsil municipal administrations to the company through a services and asset management agreement.

== Tourism ==
Abbottabad has long been associated with summer tourism because of its hill-station setting and its location on routes into northern Pakistan. Encyclopaedia Britannica describes Abbottabad as a hill station and a summer resort, and identifies it as a gateway to the Kaghan Valley. The Khyber Pakhtunkhwa Culture and Tourism Authority describes the city as a summer resort in a spacious valley about 1,250 m (4,100 ft) above sea level.

The city also serves as a base for travel to nearby hill stations and natural areas in Abbottabad District and the wider Galyat region. A travel guide published by the Pakistan Tourism Development Corporation describes Abbottabad as a base for trips to the Kaghan Valley and the Gallies, and lists Shimla Hill and Ilyasi Masjid among places to visit in Abbottabad city. The same guide identifies Harnoi as a picnic spot about 10 km (6.2 mi) northeast of Abbottabad on the main Nathia Gali road.

Nathia Gali can be approached from both Murree and Abbottabad, and is about 38 km (24 mi) from each. Ayubia National Park, located in Abbottabad District, was declared a national park on 17 January 1984 and covers about 3,375 ha (8,340 acres). Other nearby destinations include Thandiani, which KP Tourism describes as a hill resort about 30 km (19 mi) east of Abbottabad at an altitude of about 2,800 m (9,200 ft).

The wider Galyat area includes several trekking routes. The Galyat brochure lists routes including Nathia Gali to Mushkpuri, Dungagali to Ayubia, and Nathia Gali to Miranjani.

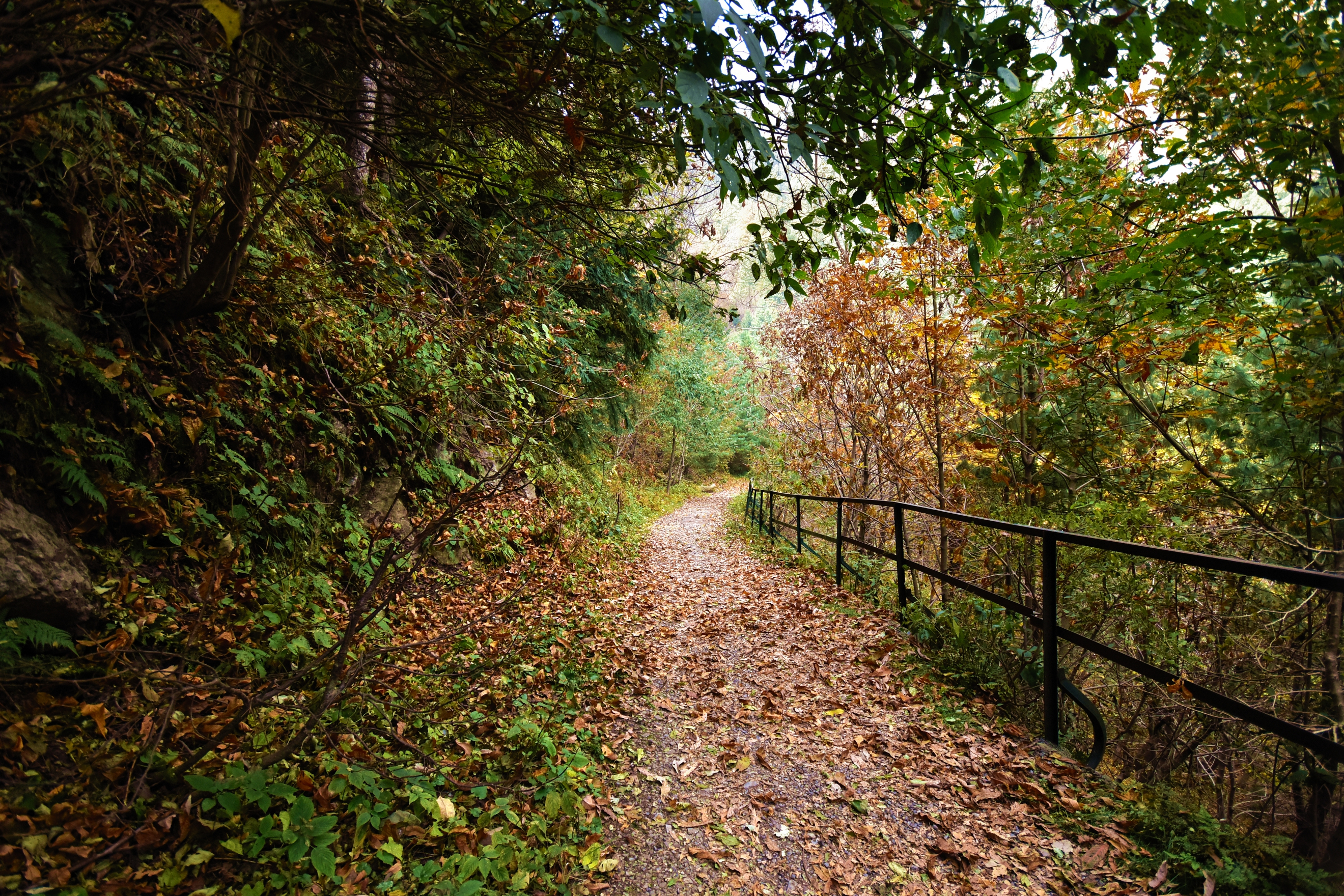
Pipeline Track in Ayubia National Park

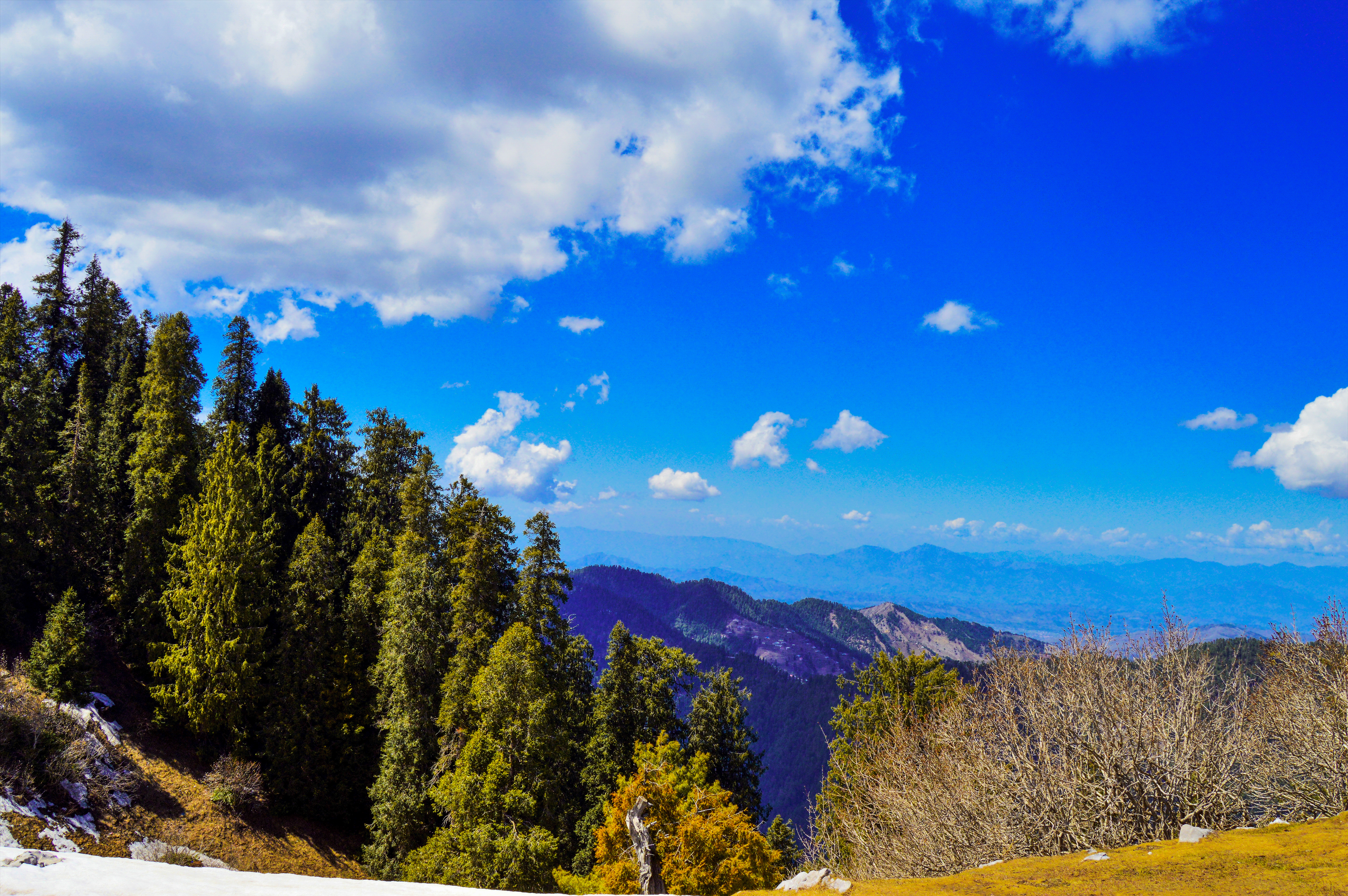
View from Mushkpuri in the Galyat region

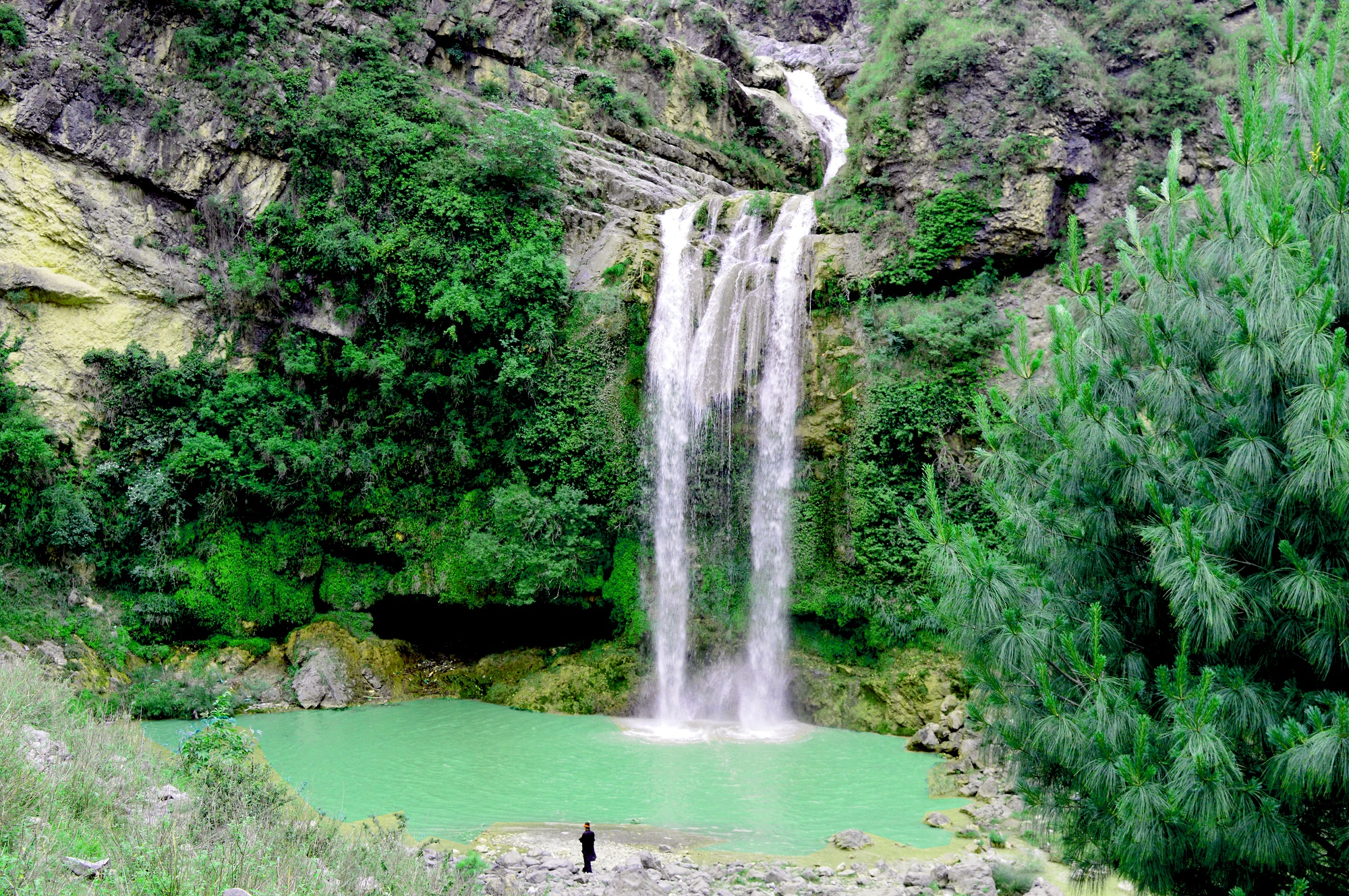
Sajikot Waterfall near Havelian

Abbottabad's road links also connect it with long-distance tourist routes into northern Pakistan. The Karakoram Highway connects Islamabad with Kashgar in Xinjiang, China, and passes through or near the Hindu Kush and Karakoram ranges. As a result, Abbottabad is often used as a transit point for travel towards the mountain valleys and towns of northern Pakistan.

Tourism in Abbottabad District is seasonal. A working paper by the Pakistan Institute of Development Economics identified June to August as peak tourist months in the district, with March to May and September to October treated as normal tourist months and November to February as a lower-tourism period. The same study reported that tourism-related activity was associated with local pressures including traffic congestion, price increases, littering and noise pollution.

== Culture and landmarks ==
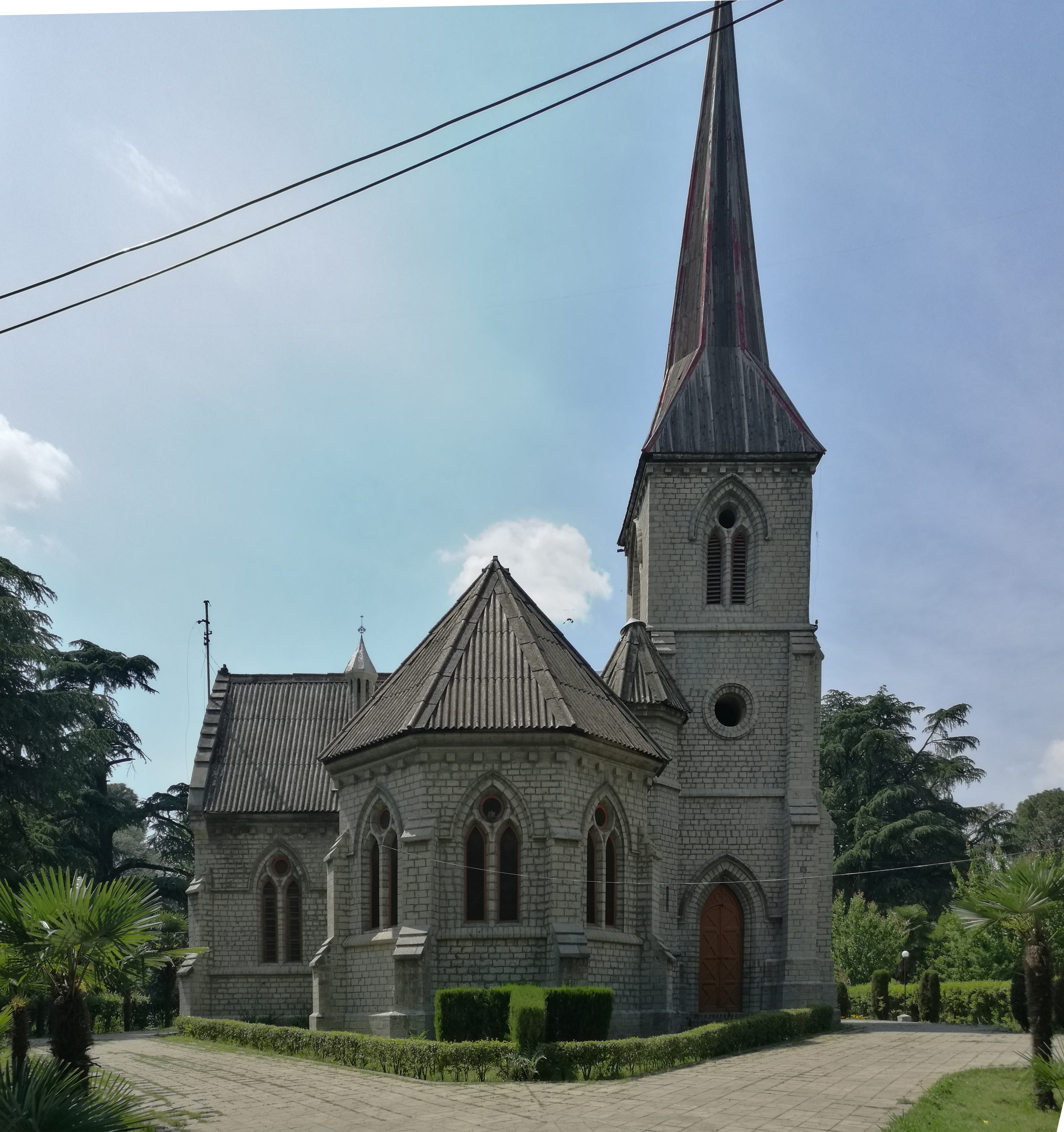
St. Luke's Church

Abbottabad's cultural landscape includes colonial-era civic buildings, religious sites, public gardens and museum collections associated with the wider Hazara region. The district administration lists several historical, archaeological and tourist attractions in Abbottabad, including Abbott House, St. Luke's Church, the Catholic Church, the Old Tehsil Building and Abbott Museum.

St. Luke's Church is one of the city's main surviving colonial-era religious buildings. The church was built in 1864 during British rule and was originally established to serve British officials in the Indian subcontinent. The church has retained features from its early period, including stained-glass windows, old locks, a pipe organ and memorial plaques.

Lady Garden Park is another colonial-era landmark associated with the city's early history. A marble plaque in the park contains the poem Abbottabad, written by James Abbott, after whom the city is named.

Abbottabad also has museum collections connected with the archaeology and ethnology of the Hazara region. The Hazara University Department of Archaeology states that it runs Abbott Museum in Abbottabad and Hazara University Museum, and that the museums contain archaeological and ethnological materials acquired through explorations, excavations, purchases and donations. The Directorate General of Archaeology and Museums, Khyber Pakhtunkhwa also lists Abbottabad Museum among the museums managed by the provincial archaeology department.

Ilyasi Masjid in Nawan Shehr is a religious and cultural landmark of Abbottabad. The mosque was built around 1927–1932 and is located near a natural stream at the foot of a hill. Visit Silk Road describes it as a historical place in Nawan Shehr and states that it was built on a mountain spring in 1932.

== Education ==
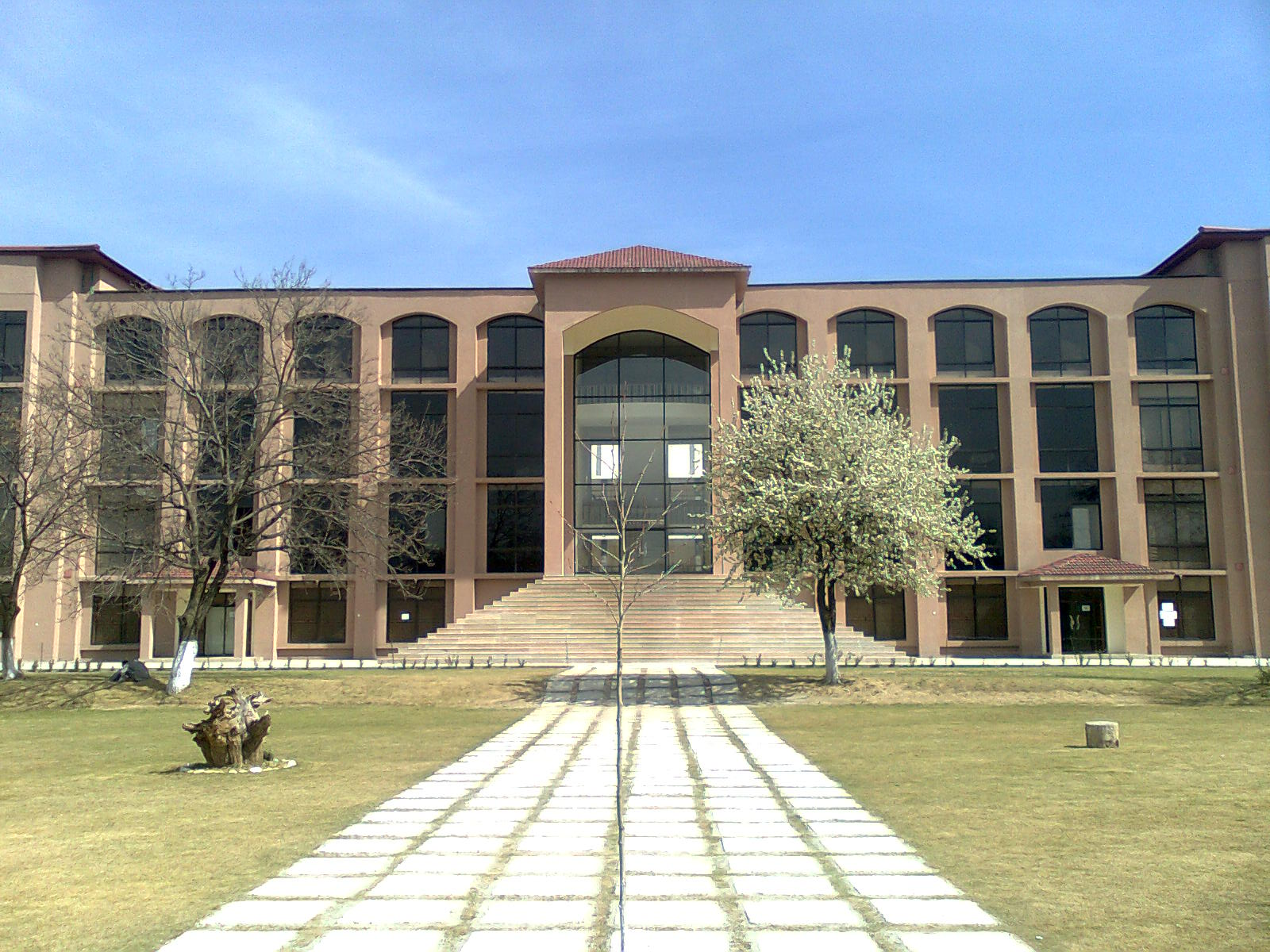
COMSATS University Islamabad, Abbottabad Campus

Abbottabad has a concentration of school-level, higher-education and professional institutions in the Hazara Division. The district administration describes the city as a "city of schools and colleges" because of its public and private schools, colleges and universities. The University of Engineering & Technology, Peshawar has also described Abbottabad as having gained fame as a city of schools and colleges.

At the district level, a report by the Auditor General of Pakistan recorded 1,317 primary, 165 middle, 123 secondary and 30 higher secondary schools in Abbottabad District, and gave the district literacy rate as 56.6%. The same report recorded enrolment of 135,494 students in boys' government schools and 118,258 students in girls' government schools in the district. These figures refer to Abbottabad District rather than only the municipal city.

School-level institutions in and around Abbottabad include Army Burn Hall College, Abbottabad Public School, Pakistan International Public School and College and Army Public School and College, PMA Kakul campus.

The city includes several higher-education and professional institutions. COMSATS University Islamabad operates an Abbottabad campus; the Higher Education Commission lists Abbottabad among the university's campuses. The University of Engineering & Technology, Peshawar operates an Abbottabad Campus, which was inaugurated in October 2002 in the former premises of Ayub Medical College. The campus lists departments and programmes in fields including electronics engineering, architecture, city and regional planning, computer science and software engineering.

Ayub Medical College, a public medical college in Abbottabad, opened its first academic year on 15 May 1979 and later moved to its Mansehra Road campus in 1990. The Pakistan Medical and Dental Council lists Abbottabad International Medical College, Frontier Medical College and Women Medical College among private medical colleges in Abbottabad.

Pakistan Military Academy is located at Kakul, about 8 km (5.0 mi) northeast of Abbottabad, and provides officer training for the Pakistan Army.

== Healthcare ==
Abbottabad is a healthcare centre for the Hazara Division and surrounding areas of northern Pakistan. Public health services in Abbottabad District include primary and secondary facilities administered through district health authorities. A report by the Auditor General of Pakistan for audit year 2021–22 recorded 108 health facilities across the district, including 54 basic health units, 42 civil dispensaries, five rural health centres and three tehsil headquarters or Category-D hospitals. The same report stated that the Department of Health used an Independent Monitoring Unit to monitor health facility performance through field-based data collection and district monitoring officers. These figures refer to Abbottabad District rather than only the municipal city.

Ayub Medical and Teaching Institution, Abbottabad is a major tertiary care teaching hospital associated with Ayub Medical College. The hospital began working in 1995 and reached 1,000-bed status in 1998. Its services include outpatient and inpatient care, general and specialised wards, accident and emergency care, intensive and cardiac care units, operation theatres, delivery suites, pharmacy, radiology and imaging, physiotherapy, blood bank and laboratory services. The institution states that its catchment area includes the Hazara Division, Gilgit-Baltistan and Azad Kashmir.

During the COVID-19 pandemic, a study of healthcare workers in hospitals of Abbottabad found that the pandemic negatively affected their quality of life. In December 2020, a data from the National Command and Operation Centre, reported that Abbottabad had recorded the highest COVID-19 positivity ratio in Pakistan on reported dates that month.

== Sports ==
Cricket is one of the main organised sports associated with Abbottabad. Abbottabad Cricket Stadium, is listed by the Pakistan Cricket Board as a first-class cricket ground. The ground has been used for domestic cricket; the PCB's 2024–25 Quaid-e-Azam Trophy schedule included matches at Abbottabad Cricket Stadium.

Abbottabad has been represented in Pakistan's domestic cricket structure by regional teams. The Pakistan Cricket Board listed Abbottabad Region among the teams in the 2024–25 Quaid-e-Azam Trophy. The former Abbottabad Falcons also appeared in national domestic cricket records, including Twenty20 and List A cricket competitions.

The city also has facilities for field hockey. In 2021, the Government of Khyber Pakhtunkhwa had approved funds for reconstruction of Abbottabad Hockey Stadium, including installation of AstroTurf, floodlights, a sprinkler system, spectator stands and other improvements.

== Transport ==
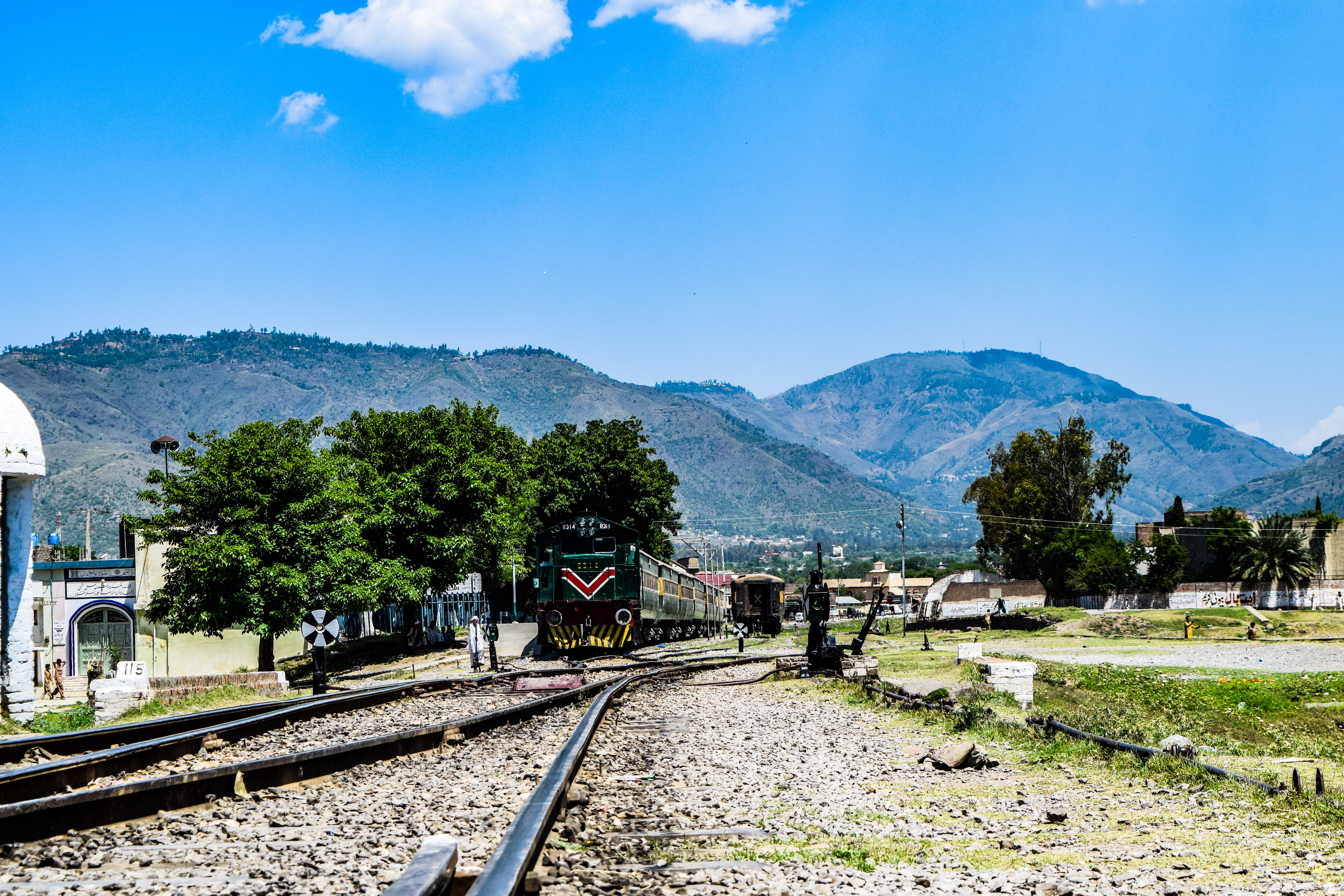
Havelian railway station in Havelian, the nearest railhead to Abbottabad

Abbottabad is connected by road with the plains of the Indus River and the Kashmir region, and by rail through nearby Havelian. Its position on routes between central Pakistan and the northern highlands has made the city an important transport point for movement towards northern Pakistan and areas along the Karakoram Highway.

The Karakoram Highway is the principal interregional road corridor associated with Abbottabad. The highway connects Kashgar in Xinjiang, China, with Islamabad, Pakistan, and passes through or near the Hindu Kush and Karakoram mountain ranges. A 2024 sustainable mobility study identified the Karakoram Highway as the main corridor for the first phase of a proposed bus rapid transit line in Abbottabad.

A 2024 sustainable urban mobility factsheet reported that walking accounted for 64% of trips in the Abbottabad urban area, followed by informal public transport at 16%, formal public transport at 5%, private cars at 6%, private motorcycles or two-wheelers at 5%, and other modes at 4%. The same source identified major urban mobility issues in the city, including vehicle inflows linked to tourism, commercial traffic passing through the city, limited alternative routes and parking areas, weak facilities for non-motorised transport, road-safety problems and vehicle-related air pollution.

The nearest railway station is Havelian railway station in Havelian, about 16 km (9.9 mi) south of Abbottabad, which connects the area with Peshawar through the Pakistan Railways network.
