= James Abbott (Indian Army officer) =

Bengal Army officer and colonial administrator

Sir James Abbott
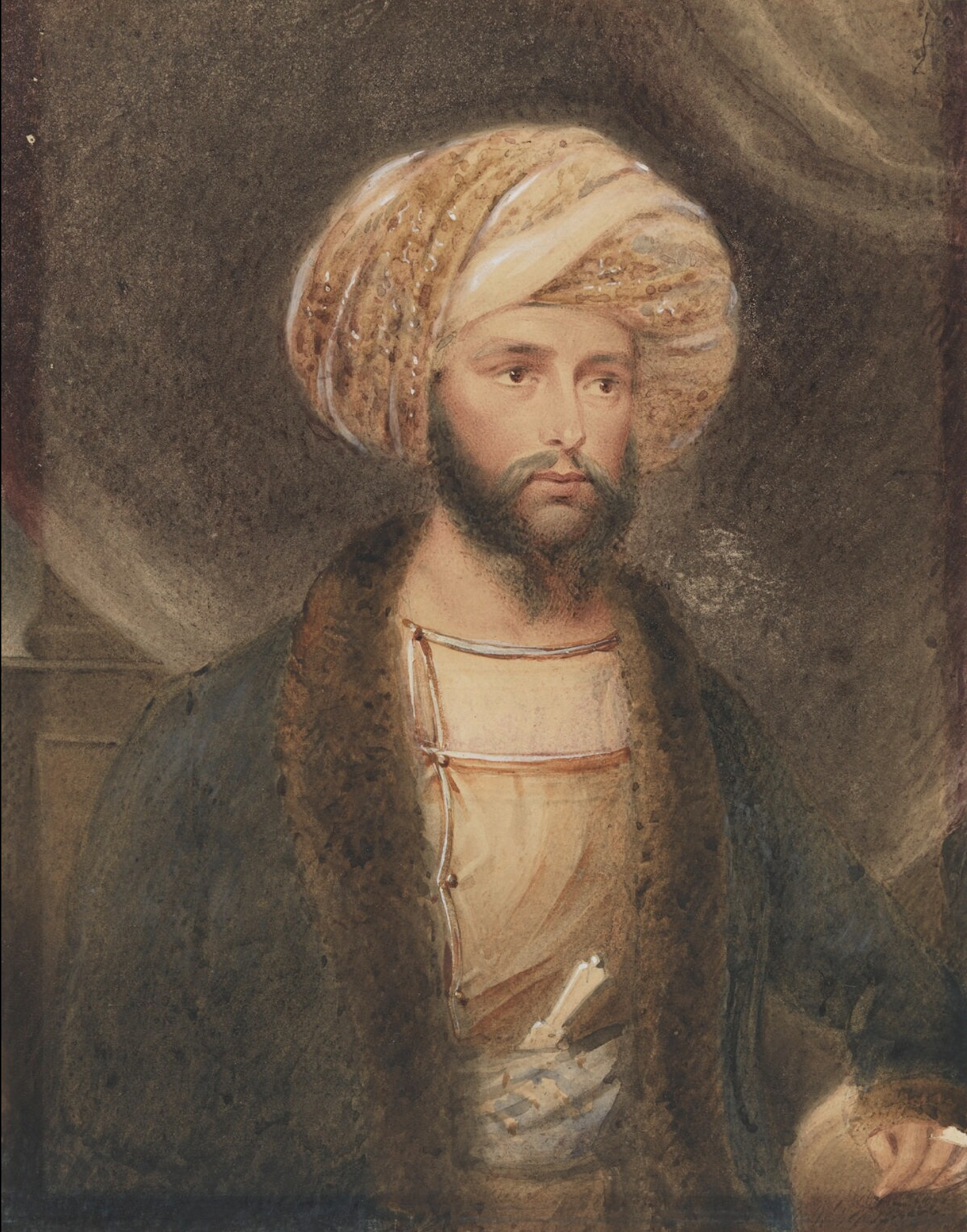
- Portrait by B. Baldwin, 1841
- Born: 12 March 1807; Blackheath, Kent, England
- Died: 6 October 1896 (aged 89); Ryde, Isle of Wight, England
- Relatives: Major General Augustus Abbott; Major General Sir Frederick Abbott; Major General Saunders Alexius Abbott; Consul General Keith Edward Abbott
- Military career
- Allegiance: East India Company; British India
- Branch: Bengal Army
- Rank: General
- Unit: Bengal Artillery
- Conflicts: First Anglo-Sikh War; Second Anglo-Sikh War
- Awards: KCB

General Sir James Abbott (12 March 1807 – 6 October 1896) was a British Bengal Army officer and colonial administrator. The city of Abbottabad, Pakistan, was founded by and subsequently named after him.

== Family history ==
Among the founders of the Levant Company in 1581 was Morris Abbott which with Royal sanction dominated trade with the Levant. Ancestors of James Abbott travelled to the east as merchants of this company. On his paternal side Abbott had Armenian, Greek and Italian ancestry, his father Henry Abbott was born in Pera Constantinople on 16 October 1764, the son of Jasper Abbott and Kyrioki Athanasius Abbott. His paternal grandmother being the daughter of Reverend Athanasius of the Greek Orthodox church in Constantinople. At four years old Henry moved to Ankara for a while where the family had property. James Abbott would write in his journals that, like himself, his father was multilingual - able to speak Turkish, Italian, French and Latin.

In 1783, Henry Abbott who had been based in Aleppo found his career beginning to face increasing difficulties, the French were dominating trade in the region and the Levant Company was declining in fortune as a result of this Henry left Aleppo in July 1784 for Calcutta.

== Early life ==
According to the 1881 census, Abbott was born in Blackheath, Kent - while the 1891 census records he was born in Greenwich, Kent. Part of Blackheath lies within the parish of Greenwich but no specific town or village is specified in either of the censuses. No parish or regional records list a "James Abbott" born in London in 1807, however there is a record of a "James Abbott" who was born in 1807 in India and who died in 1896.

James Abbott was the third son of Henry Alexius Abbott, a retired merchant of Blackheath, and wife Margaret Welsh, the daughter of William Welsh of Edinburgh. He was one of eleven siblings, a number of whom like himself went on to achieve distinction, his brothers Augustus, Frederick and Saunders in the military while Keith became a diplomat.

Abbott was educated Eliot Place School in Eliot Place, Blackheath - the original site is now abandoned having been moved to its current location in 1872. One notable alumnus that Abbott studied alongside at this school was future UK Prime Minister Benjamin Disraeli. In 1821, at the age of fourteen years old, Abbott began his studies at the East India Company Military Seminary in Addiscombe, Surrey as a cadet for the Regiment of Artillery. . Abbott's brother Frederick had joined the Seminary the previous year as a cadet, finishing his studies in 1822 - while James studied there until 1823. During his time there Abbott learned Hindustani as taught by John Shakespear, Shakespear while able to teach grammar was unable to speak the language.

In June 1823 he passed his studies, successfully graduating in artillery and went back to his mother's cottage in Somerset before beginning a six month voyage to Calcutta alongside his brother Frederick and sister Emma in September 1823.

== Early career in India ==
Abbott was commissioned as a cadet in the Bengal Artillery at the age of sixteen, arriving in India in 29 December 1823. James and his brother Frederick would spend six months in Fort William before moving to the town of Dum Dum that was at that time a separate town to Calcutta and the headquarters of the Bengal Artillery. While there the First Anglo-Burmese War broke out, Frederick volunteered to take part while James stated behind. It was also here that Abbott became reacquainted with D’Arcy Todd who would go on to be a close friend. In October 1824, three native regiments at Barrackpore were ordered to prepare to march for war in Burma, in November a mutiny broke out as the troops had various grievances about their orders Abbott had "tried hard for permission to join the Battery" to put down the mutiny but had been denied, Shortly after the end of the mutiny the 1st Battery of Foot Artillery of the Bengal Artillery received orders to be relocated, Abbott had orders to go to Agra. While travelling in convey near to Baruipur Abbott obtained permission from Major Glenshaw for leave so he could visit his sisters Emma, Clementine and Clementine's husband James Elphinstone who lived in the town. After his month's leave was over he continued his journey, in May 1825 he arrived in Agra where he met up with his eldest brother Augustus who had already been stationed there - both men were artillery officers in the Bengal Army.

He first saw action at the Siege of Bharatpur in 1826 under the command of his older brother Augustus, where British forces were besieging a great Jat fortress. Augustus was a captain in an artillery regiment of the Bengal Army, whereas James was a Second lieutenant serving in the 3rd Company. On the 28th of September 1827 he was promoted to First Lieutenant in the Bengal Artillery and made adjutant to the Sirhind division of British artillery. During this period he saw little action, and between 1835 and 1836 was assigned to the revenue surveys in Gorakhpur and later Bareilly. Records from 1837 show Abbott being part of the revenue survey while his older brother Augustus Abbott was a captain in the same regiment. In June 1838 he was promoted to brevet captain.

== The Great Game ==
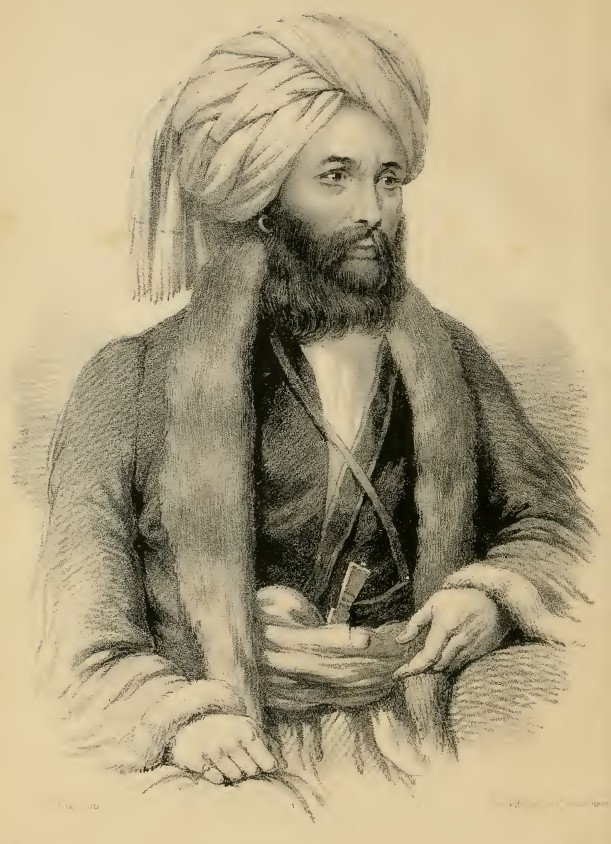
Abbott's 1843 sketch of Peer Muhummud Khaun, the commander of Abbott's escort in Afghanistan

In November 1838, Abbott served in the army of Sir John Keane, who had been tasked with supporting Shah Shuja Durrani in his bid to wrest power from Dost Mohammad Khan in Afghanistan. The British had been eager to secure Afghanistan, the gateway to India, in light of increasing Russian influence in Central Asia.

In 1839 the British learned that Russia was planning an invasion of the Khanate of Khiva, Major Elliott D'Arcy Todd received intelligence from Khiva that 100,000 "fighting men" were in Kuzzauk country. In December 1839 acting Captain Abbott was sent from Herat to Khiva in an attempt to negotiate the release of Russian slaves and thereby deny the Russians a pretext for invasion. If war had already broken out, Abbott was instructed to attempt to negotiate a settlement. On the 24th of December Abbott left Herat, however shortly after leaving he had to halt at a village near to tomb of the poet Jami where he said he "was hospitably entertained by a descendant of the poet". The next day Abbott left the village in the morning and travelled to Purwana which lies 11 miles away from Herat in a high valley, Abbott noted how the village was "depopulated" due to the activities of the Jumsheedees apparently with the blessing of Vuzeer Yar Muhummud Khaun. The people of the areas were Tajiks who Abbott says "received and entertained me very hospitably", escorting Abbott on his journey was Peer Muhummud Khaun who was a relative of the vizier. Peer Muhummud was the commander of five horsemen that accompanied Abbott from Herat - this number increasing to fifteen when they reached Punj Deeh. As Abbott could understand Persian he wrote he was "deep conversation with him" when he had the opportunity to speak to him during the journey. After crossing the mountain ridge of Kytoo (Koh‑i‑Khushk), Abbott travelled to Khooshk which he described as "the capital of the Jumsheedees", Peer Muhummud had advised to travel to this settlement which he arrived at on the 27th of December.

Abbott described how previously Khooshk had been attacked by the Persians and the Jumsheedees appeared to have fled without taking advantaged of the terrain to harass the Persians, thus losing land and resources. Abbott also noted that the reception he received at Khooshk was cool, he suspected that this was at the instigation of Peer Muhummud Khaun. Abbott briefly met the Jumsheedee chief - Mahomed Zemaun Khaun who departed after a brief discussion. Abbott was glad to leave Khooshk which he described as the "den of inhospitality", he noted that upon successfully mounting his horse at departure his Meerza shouted "Ullah Kurreem" while his Steward Summud Khaun replied "Shookkur" Abbott wrote that he replied "Bismillah".

Abbott and his men then marched to Kara Tuppah (the black mound) which was a 150 feet artificial hill used as a defensive structure. Afterwards they followed the course of the Khooshk rivulet passing the ruins of a castle called Howzi Khaun which had been the location of a battle between Derveish Khaun (the former chief of the Jumsheedees), and the Huzzahruhs assisted by Mahomed Zemaun Khaun with the latter being victorious. After this Abbott left Baudkhis District and then entered Mowree District and found the ruined castle Kullah-i-Mowr, at this point Abbott estimated they came upon "not less than six or seven caravans of grain from Merv. It was here that Abbott wrote the "Kingdom of Khaurism" begins i.e. the Khanate of Khiva.

Abbott reached Khiva in late January, a week or so before the Russians were forced to turn back due to an unusually cold winter. The Khivans knew little of Britain and he was hampered by a lack of understanding of the language and culture of Khiva. The attempt to release Russian slaves failed. He did agree with the Khivan ruler, Allah Quli Khan, to establish a British agent in Khiva and to travel to Russia to negotiate between the two powers. He had no authorisation to serve as the Khan's agent, but had no way to communicate with his superiors in India. In March 1840 Abbott set off from Khiva to Fort Alexandrovsk on the Caspian Sea. His caravan was attacked by Kazakhs and he was wounded in the hand and taken hostage, but he and his party were released because the Kazakhs feared British retribution. He reached Saint Petersburg but the attempt at mediation failed. His bravery was recognised through promotion to full Captain.

In May 1840 Lieutenant Richmond Shakespear of the Bengal Artillery went from Herat via Merv to Khiva. He was successful and escorted 416 Russian captives to the Caspian. Shakespear was knighted for this undertaking, succeeding where Abbott had failed but Abbott had laid the groundwork for the ultimate success of the mission.

== The Paladins of the Punjab ==
In 1841, Abbott returned from Britain to India. He first held a post with a local battalion in Mewar before becoming assistant to Claude Martin Wade, the Resident in Indore, in 1842. Following the conclusion of the First Anglo-Sikh War in 1846, Abbott was hand picked to become one of Sir Henry Lawrence's "Young Men", also known as The Paladins of the Punjab. These were East India Company officers sent to act as "advisers" to the Sikh ruler.

Sir Henry Lawrence remarked of him:

Made of stuff of the true knight errant, gentle as a girl in thought, word and deed, overflowing with warm affection, and ready at all times to sacrifice himself for his country or his friend. He is at the same time a brave, scientific and energetic soldier, with a peculiar power for attracting others, especially Asiatics to his person.

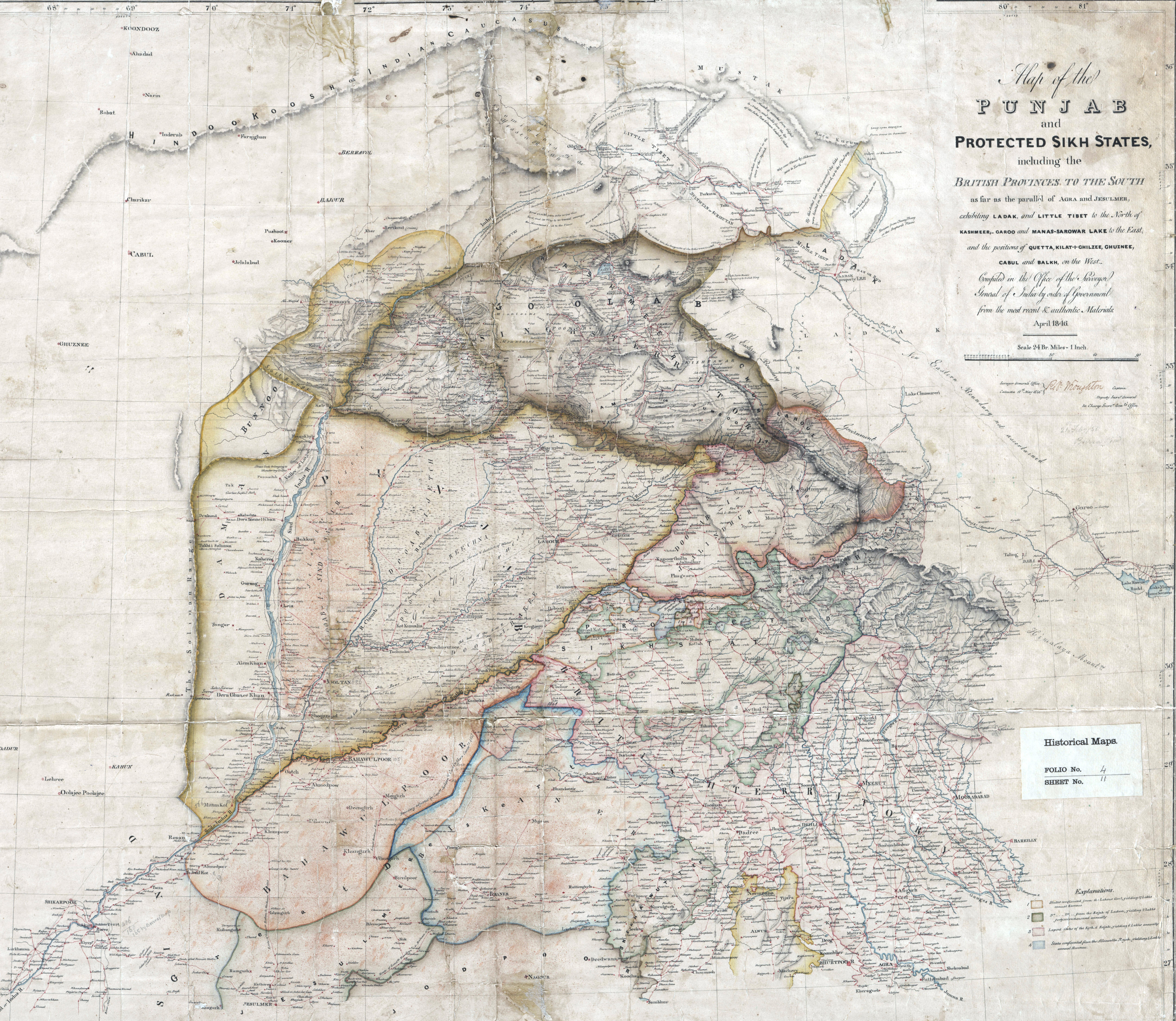
1846 showing the territory of Gulab Singh, including Hazara & Punjab (Lahore Durbar)

As part of the Treaty of Amritsar March 1846 Kashmir and its dependencies—including the hilly region of Hazara—were sold to Gulab Singh in return for a payment of 75 lakh rupees. The treaty described the transferred territory as “all the hilly or mountainous country, with its dependencies, situated eastward of the River Indus and westward of the River Ravi.” Gulab Singh sent Diwan Hari Chand to collect revenue in Hazara, but faced widespread resistance from local chiefs and communities. By November 1846, British-supported forces had to march into Upper Hazara to suppress unrest. On 6 January 1847, after continued instability, Gulab Singh formally returned Hazara to the British-influenced (after First anglo-sikh war) Lahore government in exchange for territory near Jammu. Captain James Abbott was appointed to assess and administer Hazara, and by 31 January 1848 he reported the district to be fully pacified and under British control. Abbott was appointed assistant to Chattar Singh Attariwalla to quell unrest and undertake a survey of revenues. Abbott succeeded in this by learning the language, culture and religion of the local people and promoting their social and economic interests. He made himself popular with Pashtun elders by permitting the call to prayer, which had been banned by the Sikhs.

In July 1848, a few months after the Second Anglo-Sikh War began, Abbott reported from Hazara that the Sikh Brigade at Gandhian in Pakhli, were in a disaffected state, and that he was suspicious of Chatar Singh. Abbott was at that time based in Sherwan, where he had been since May. By the beginning of August Abbott received intelligence that the Sikh troops intended to march to Lahore. He then took measures to recruit the Muslims of Hazara, on the 6th of August Colonel Canora was shot in Haripur which marked the point that the rebellion fully broke out. Despite the severity of the rebellion, Abbott held his position at Srikot and cut off from all communication with British troops, and dependent upon his own resources, Abbott held the Margalla Hills with a vastly inferior force until the conclusion of the war, a feat for which he was thanked by the Governor-General, The Earl of Dalhousie:

It is a gratifying spectacle to witness the intrepid bearing of this officer in the midst of difficulties of no ordinary kind, not merely maintaining his position, but offering a bold front, at one time to the Sikhs at another to the Afghans. He must have secured the attachment of the wild people amongst whom he was thrown by his mild and conciliatory demeanour in times of peace, as well as by his gallantry as their leader in action, thus enhancing the credit of our national character.

On the 24th of April 1849 Sir John Hobhouse spoke in parliament in praise of Abbott's actions - stating that "the Hazareh country is now in our hands entirely in consequence of the admirable conduct of Captain Abbott." Hobhouse spoke of how Abbott's action prepared "the way for the easy occupation of an almost impregnable country" and that Abbott "must have secured the attachment" of what he referred to as the "wild people" - pointing out that he managed to keep both Sikh and Afghan armies at bay with his leadership of the local people.

In contrast to Hobhouse's words of praise, in August 1849 Lord Dalhousie (who was Governor-General of India at the time) wrote that Abbott “must not be permitted to set up Hazara as a small kingdom of his own.”

== Abbottabad ==
After the British had annexed the Punjab in the aftermath of the Second Anglo-Sikh War, Abbott was promoted to brevet major and appointed First Deputy Commissioner of Hazara in 1849. In 1852, he successfully commanded an expedition to the Black Mountain following the murder of Mr Carne and Mr Tapp, collector and sub-collector of the salt tax by a party of sixty Hassanzais in the Hazara region.

Abbott's original seat of government in the Hazara was at Haripur with Jagirdar of Nara but he eventually decided to shift this up into the hills in 1851 for climatic and strategic reasons. Thus, a site was selected and acquired in late 1852, and Abbott thereafter shifted his headquarters there in January 1853, founding a small town and military cantonment which was to grow over time. Abbott himself could not long witness the growth of his town, which was later named after him by his colleague Herbert Benjamin Edwardes. In April 1853 he was removed from his post in the Hazara region and transferred back to the Bengal Army, where he was placed in charge of a gunpowder factory in Calcutta. His transfer came amid concerns from Lahore over the methods of his governance, fears of divided loyalty, and antagonistic relationships with certain fellow officers.

His last public act as Deputy Commissioner was to invite every person in the district to a party he was holding at Nara Hills. The party lasted three days and nights and was attended by 'a large and lamenting crowd of people'. Abbott reportedly spent all of his savings on the party save for one month's pay. His affection for the local Hazaras was noted by his successor Herbert Edwardes who wrote:

He had literally lived among them as their patriarch – an out of the door, under tree life. Every man, woman and child in the country knew him personally, and hastened from their occupations to salute him as he came their way. The children especially were his favourites. They used to go to "Kaka Abbott" whenever their mouths watered for fruit or sugar plums. He spent all his substance on the people.

Known as "Kaka Abbott" (uncle Abbott) by the locals, he could speak Hindko, Punjabi, Pashto, Urdu as well as Hindi and thus was able to communicate with local people, in Afghanistan Abbott had written of his meeting with a relation of the Vizier of Herat (Peer Muhummud Khaun) and the fact he could "understand his Persian".

According to Pakistani researcher Sahibzada Jawad Al-Faizi, Abbott usually disguised himself and mixed with ordinary people. While in disguise he used to stay in an area around Sherwan, thirty kilometres away from Abbottabad city, the centre of Abbottabad to the centre of Sherwan is about 35 km. In a few historical records it is said that he even disguised himself as an Imam of a mosque to understand the conditions of the people. Within Hazara he had a reputation as a compassionate and just Deputy Commissioner. Even today he is spoken of as a good administrator, researcher and linguist, although in 2021 his office was destroyed despite being listed as an historic site.

Before he left he also penned an ode to his new settlement, which included the following lines:

I remember the day when I first came here
I adored the place from the first sight
And was happy that my coming here was right
Oh Abbottabad we are leaving you now
To your natural beauty do I bow
Perhaps your winds sound will never reach my ear
My gift for you is few sad tears
I bid you farewell with a heavy heart
Never from my mind will your memories thwart.

== Later life ==
In May 1857, a couple of months after Abbott turned fifty, a rebellion broke out against British rule in India which would last towards the end of 1858. In July 1857 Abbott was promoted to lieutenant-colonel and in November of that year to brevet colonel. Four later during the third cholera epidemic, Abbott commanded the Bengal Artillery who were stationed in Delhi when the disease struck. Abbott took command of the station on the 27th of July 1861, and was praised for his conduct by the authors of a report into the cholera epidemic, they wrote that:

From first to last there was no duty which Colonel Abbott did not discharge in the manner which might have been expected from so well-known and so distinguished a soldier.

Abbott was made a Companion of the Order of the Bath on 24 May 1873 and a general on his retirement in 1877. He settled in Ryde on the Isle of Wight in 1890 and was made a Knight Commander on 26 May 1894. He died on the Isle of Wight in 1896.

== Personal life ==
Abbott married Margaret Anne Harriett Fergusson in Calcutta on 8 February 1843, she was the eldest daughter of John Hutchison Fergusson of Trochraigne. The following year on the 10th of February 1844 she gave birth to their daughter Margaret but died from complications following the birth the next day. James Abbott later married Anna Matilda de Montmorency in 1868, she was the youngest daughter of Major Reymond de Montmorency of the 67th Bengal Native Infantry in the Indian army. Anna died two years later shortly after having given birth to their son, James Reymond de Montmorency Abbott in 1870. James Reymond lived until 1963, Trinity College archives at the University of Cambridge note that he was a friend of writer Desmond MacCarthy/

== Legacy ==
The Pakistani city of Abbottabad as well as the district and subdistrict is named after him. The city itself was founded by him in January 1853 and later grew from a small military outpost to a hub of trade. The people of Abbottabad have rejected various proposals to rename the city.

A portrait of James Abbott dressed as an Afghan noble and relating to his Central Asian journey, was painted in watercolour in 1841 by B. Baldwin (see illustration), now in the collection of the National Portrait Gallery in London. This portrait resembles Abbott's 1843 sketch of Peer Muhummud Khaun.

== See also ==
- John Nicholson (East India Company officer)
