= Sustainable Urban Mobility Plan =

A Sustainable Urban Mobility Plan (SUMP) is a planning concept applied by local and regional authorities for strategic mobility planning. It encourages a shift towards more sustainable transport modes and supports the integration and balanced development of all modes. A SUMP is instrumental in solving urban transport problems and reaching local and higher-level environmental, social, and economic objectives. Sustainable Urban Mobility Plans are defined as "a strategic plan designed to satisfy the mobility needs of people and businesses in cities and their surroundings for a better quality of life. It builds on existing planning practices and takes due consideration of integration, participation, and evaluation principles.”

== European policy background ==
In 2009, the European Commission first adopted the Action Plan on Urban Mobility, which proposes measures to encourage and help local, regional and national authorities in achieving their goals for sustainable urban mobility. Also the 2011 Transport White Paper “Roadmap to a Single European Transport Area - Towards a competitive and resource efficient transport system” advises cities to develop Sustainable Urban Mobility Plans. The European Commission adopted the Urban Mobility Package “Together towards competitive and resource-efficient urban mobility” in December 2013. Sustainable urban mobility planning is emphasized in the Urban Mobility Package alongside urban freight distribution, urban access regulations, deployment of intelligent transportation system (ITS) solutions in urban areas and road traffic safety. In its annex, the Urban Mobility Package includes a comprehensive definition and explanation of the SUMP concept which was developed based on a discussion and exchange process between planning experts and stakeholders across the European Union. Now, Sustainable Urban Mobility Planning is Europe's de facto urban transport planning concept. Since the publication of the Urban Mobility Package in 2013, the concept of Sustainable Urban Mobility Plans has been widely taken up across Europe and internationally.

== SUMP Guidelines ==
The Guidelines for Developing and Implementing a Sustainable Urban Mobility Plan (or SUMP Guidelines) are the result of an intense one-year stakeholder engagement process, coordinated by main authors Rupprecht Consult and led by a special editorial board, which includes DG MOVE, the CIVITAS SUMP projects, Eltis, INEA, DG REGIO, JASPERS, and leading mobility researchers. The Guidelines have been developed and validated in close cooperation with the SUMP community of European cities. By involving several major city networks closely in the update, special care was taken to include feedback from all types of cities and regions. The Guidelines are based on the eight Sustainable Planning Principles and describe all phases of a Sustainable Urban Mobility Plan from Phase 1: Preparation & Analysis, Phase 2: Strategy development, Phase 3: Measure Planning to Phase 4: Implementation & Monitoring. The phases are subdivided into different steps, each explained with best practice examples from cities, instruments and tools to support the process, tasks and a checklist for planners. The main document is complemented by an Annex which includes a Glossary, a comprehensive checklist and over 50 detailed good practice examples.

== Objectives and aims ==
A Sustainable Urban Mobility Plan addresses all modes and forms of urban and regional transport. It aims to provide sustainable and high-quality transport and mobility in the agglomeration and enhance its accessibility. Instead of addressing the needs of the administrative area only, a SUMP regards the entire urban area including its commuter hinterland. A SUMP integrates technical, infrastructure, policy, and soft measures to improve performance and cost-effectiveness. It aims to meet the basic mobility needs of all users. The SUMP concept emphasizes aspects of participatory planning, vertical and horizontal integration, and mechanisms for monitoring, evaluation and quality control.

== See also ==
- Sustainability
- Sustainable transport
- Transportation planning
- Alternatives to car use
- Local transport plans
- Sustainable city (includes a section on Transportation)
- Participatory planning
- Complete streets
- Bicycle-friendly
- Walkability
- Road traffic safety

External links

- EC urban mobility
- Eltis
- Civitas
- CH4LLENGE
