= Bagh =

Bagh (Persian: باغ, meaning "garden") may refer to:

== Places ==
=== Bangladesh ===
- Bagh Prachanda Khan, a village in Beanibazar, Sylhet district
- Lal Bagh, a neighbourhood in Dhaka
- Mali Bagh, a neighbourhood in Dhaka
- Rajar Bagh, a neighbourhood in Dhaka
- Sen Bagh, a subdistrict of Noakhali district
- Shah Bagh, a neighbourhood in Dhaka

=== India ===
- Bagh Caves in Madhya Pradesh, India
- Bagh, Dhar, a town in Madhya Pradesh, India
- Bagh Pat, a city in Uttar Pradesh, India

=== Iran ===
- Bagh, Ardabil, a village in Ardabil Province
- Bagh, Larestan, a village in Fars Province
- Bagh, Mamasani, a village in Fars Province
- Bagh, Gilan, a village in Gilan Province
- Bagh, alternate name of Bagh Chamak, a village in Kerman Province
- Bagh, Khuzestan, a village in Khuzestan Province
- Bagh, Lorestan, a village in Lorestan Province
- Bagh, North Khorasan, a village
- Bagh, South Khorasan, a village
- Bagh, West Azerbaijan, a village
- Bagh-e Olya (disambiguation)
- Bagh-e Sofla (disambiguation)
- Bagh, alternate name of Bagh-e Latifan, a village
- Bagh, alternate name of Bagh-e Sofla, Lorestan, a village
- Bagh, Zanjan, a village in Zanjan Country

=== Pakistan ===
- Bagh, Azad Kashmir, a city in Azad Kashmir, Pakistan
- Bagh District, a district in Azad Kashmir, Pakistan
- Bagh Union Council, Azad Kashmir, a union council in Bagh District, Azad Kashmir, Pakistan
- Bagh, Abbottabad, an area of Abbottabad District, Pakistan
- Bagh Union Council, Abbottabad, a union council in Abbottabad District, Pakistan
- Bagh-e-Jinnah (disambiguation)

== Other uses ==
- Bagh (garden) or Persian garden, a type of garden originating in Iran
- Bagh (shawl), a fully embroidered wedding shawl from Western India
- Peter von Bagh (1943–2014), Finnish film historian and director

== See also ==
- Bagh Express, an Indian Railways express train
- Bagh-e Bala (disambiguation)
- Bagh Stallions, a cricket franchise
- Bagha (disambiguation)
- Baghin (disambiguation)
- Kalateh-ye Bagh
