= Baghan =

Baghan or Baqan (Persian: باغان) may refer to:

- Baghan, Bushehr, a village in Bushehr Province, Iran
- Baghan, Kavar, a village in Fars Province, Iran
- Baghan, Khonj, a village in Fars Province, Iran
- Baghan, Hajjiabad, a village in Hormozgan Province, Iran
- Baghan, Jask, a village in Jask District, Hormozgan Province, Iran
- Baghan, Kerman, a village in Kerman Province, Iran
- Baghan, Kurdistan
- Baghan, North Khorasan, a village in North Khorasan Province, Iran
- Baghan, Razavi Khorasan, a village in Razavi Khorasan Province, Iran
- Baghan, South Khorasan, a village in South Khorasan Province, Iran
- Baghan Rural District, in Fars Province

== See also ==
- Baghin (disambiguation)
