= Gachin =

Gachin (Persian: گچين) may refer to:

- Gachin-e Bala, Hormozgan Province
- Gachin-e Pain, Hormozgan Province
- Gachin, Kerman, a city in Kerman Province
- Gachin, Arzuiyeh, a village in Kerman Province
- Gachin Rural District, in Hormozgan Province

== See also ==
- Baghin (disambiguation)
