= Baghin =

Baghin may refer to:

- Baghin, Burkina Faso, a town
- Baghin, Iran, a city in Kerman Province, Iran
- Baghin, Hormozgan, Iran, a village
- Baghin, Jiroft, Kerman Province, Iran, a village
- Baghin Rural District, in Kerman Province, Iran
- Bağın, the Turkified name of Baghin, an Urartian site in eastern Turkey

== See also ==
- Bagh (disambiguation)
- Bagha (disambiguation)
- Baghan (disambiguation)
- Baghini (1968 film), an Indian film
- Baghini (2019 film), an Indian film
- Gachin (disambiguation)
