= Mogh Ahmad =

Mogh Ahmad or Mugh Ahmad (Persian: مغ احمد) may refer to:

- Mogh Ahmad-e Bala
- Mogh Ahmad-e Pain
