= Bagheera (disambiguation) =

Bagheera is the black panther in Rudyard Kipling's The Jungle Book

Bagheera may also refer to:

- Archambault Bagheera, a French sailboat design
- Bagheera (spider), a spider genus
- Bagheera (2023 film), an Indian Tamil-language film
- Bagheera (2024 film), an Indian Kannada-language film
- Matra Bagheera, an automobile
- USS Bagheera, a US Navy auxiliary schooner serving as a patrol vessel in commission from 1917 to 1919
- Bagheera (schooner), a historic windjamming schooner based in Portland, Maine

== See also ==
- Bagha (disambiguation)
- Bagh (disambiguation)
- Baghera, a village in Mirzapur, Uttar Pradesh, India
- Bagheria, a city in Sicily, Italy
