= Bagh-e Bala =

Bagh-e Bala or Bagh Bala (Persian: باغ بالا) may refer to:

- Bagh-e Bala Palace, Kabul, Afghanistan
- Bagh-e Bala, Baghlan, Afghanistan
- Bagh-e Bala, Fars, Iran
- Bagh-e Bala, Hormozgan, Iran
- Bagh-e Bala, Narmashir, Kerman Province, Iran
- Bagh-e Bala, Lorestan, Iran
- Bagh-e Bala, Qom, Iran
