= Bagh Union Council =

Bagh Union Council may refer to:

- Bagh Union Council, Abbottabad, a Union Council in Abbottabad District, Khyber-Pakhtunkhwa, Pakistan
- Bagh Union Council, Azad Kashmir, a Union Council in Bagh District, Azad Kashmir, Pakistan
