= Deh Mian, Larestan =

Deh Miyan ده ميان
- Village
- Location within Iran
- Coordinates: 27°31′25″N 54°04′40″E
- Country: Iran
- Province: Fars
- County: Larestan
- Bakhsh: Sahray-ye Bagh
- Rural District: Sahray-ye Bagh

Government

Population (2006)
  - Total: 800
- Time zone: UTC+3:30 (IRST)
  - Summer (DST): UTC+4:30 (IRDT)

Deh Miyan (Persian: ده ميان, also Romanized as Deh Miyan, Deh Miyan, and Deh Miyan; also known as Deh Miyan and Deh Miyan) is a village in Sahray-ye Bagh Rural District, Sahray-ye Bagh District, Larestan County, Fars province, Iran. At the 2006 census, its population was 800, in 102 families.
