= Bareqin Khunsorkh =

Bareqin Khunsorkh بارقين خونسرخ
- Village
- Location within Iran
- Coordinates: 27°07′12″N 56°04′12″E
- Country: Iran
- Province: Hormozgan
- County: Bandar Abbas
- Bakhsh: Central
- Rural District: Gachin

Population (2006)
  - Total: 236
- Time zone: UTC+3:30 (IRST)
  - Summer (DST): UTC+4:30 (IRDT)

Bareqin Khunsorkh (Persian: بارقين خونسرخ, also Romanized as Bāreqīn Khūnsorkh; also known as Bāreqīn) is a village in Gachin Rural District, in the Central District of Bandar Abbas County, Hormozgan Province, Iran. At the 2006 census, its population was 236, in 60 families.
