= Tiyab-e Khunsorkh =

Tiyab-e Khunsorkh تياب خون سرخ
- Village
- Location within Iran
- Coordinates: 27°07′41″N 56°05′54″E
- Country: Iran
- Province: Hormozgan
- County: Bandar Abbas
- Bakhsh: Central
- Rural District: Gachin

Population (2006)
  - Total: 584
- Time zone: UTC+3:30 (IRST)
  - Summer (DST): UTC+4:30 (IRDT)

Tiyab-e Khunsorkh (Persian: تياب خون سرخ, also Romanized as Tīyāb-e Khūnsorkh) is a village in Gachin Rural District, in the Central District of Bandar Abbas County, Hormozgan Province, Iran. At the 2006 census, its population was 584, in 128 families.
