= Bagh-e Sofla =

Bagh-e Sofla (Persian: باغ سفلی) may refer to:

- Bagh-e Sofla, Lorestan
- Bagh-e Sofla, West Azerbaijan
