= Persian Gulf Residential Complex =

Persian Gulf Residential Complex كمپمسكوني خليج فارس
- Village
- Country: Iran
- Province: Hormozgan
- County: Bandar Abbas
- Bakhsh: Central
- Rural District: Gachin

Population (2006)
  - Total: 412
- Time zone: UTC+3:30 (IRST)
  - Summer (DST): UTC+4:30 (IRDT)

Persian Gulf Residential Complex (Persian: كمپمسكوني خليج فارس – Kampam Saḵūnī Khelīj-e Fārs) is a village in Gachin Rural District, in the Central District of Bandar Abbas County, Hormozgan Province, Iran. In the 2006 census, its population consisted of 412 people in 88 families.
