= Verpal Singh =

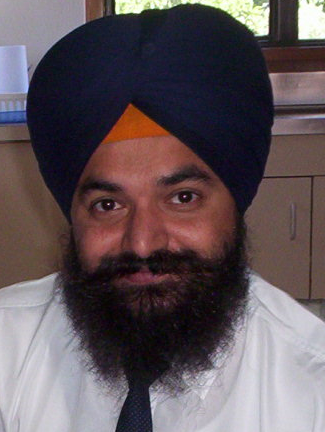
- Verpal in 2007

Founder Chairman of Sikh Centre
- Incumbent
- Assumed office 1 January 2007
- President: Bachan Singh Nihalgarh
- Deputy: B Kaur

Founder Secretary of Sikh Council of New Zealand
- Incumbent
- Assumed office 26 September 2007

Member, South East Asian Advisory Board, Counties Manukau Police
- Incumbent
- Assumed office March 2009

NZ Delegate to 5th Asia-Pacific Regional Interfaith Dialogue

Personal details
- Born: March 13, 1974 (age 52) Punjab, India
- Party: Labour
- Spouse: B Kaur
- Profession: Publisher

Verpal Singh heads The Sikh Centre, a not-for-profit organisation engaged in promoting greater interaction between Sikhs and the wider New Zealand community. He also runs a small publishing company specialising in niche areas.

== Biography ==
He is a writer, with a novel and a book of analytical essays in the pipeline. Through the Sikh Centre, he has been involved in running three annual competitions in the field of Painting, Short Story Writing, and traditional Punjabi embroidery art of Phulkari. He is an active participant in the ongoing inter-faith dialogue amongst various faith communities of New Zealand. Verpal Singh is a keen student of history, especially religious history.

== Works and publications ==
Verpal Singh has contributed editorially or contributed a chapter to the following books produced by various publishing agencies.

- Sikhism and Civilisation

Author: Daljit Singh; ISBN 81-85815-12-7

- Dynamics of Sikh Revolution

Author: Jagjit Singh; ISBN 81-85815-13-5

- History of the Sikhs and Their Religion

Editor: Kharak Singh; ISBN 81-8092-001-1

- Thoughts of Bhai Ardaman Singh

Editor: Kharak Singh; ISBN 81-85815-11-9

- Who are the Sikhs?

Author: Gurbaksh Singh; Publisher: SGPC, Amritsar

- We are not Symbols

Author: Harjot Oberoi; Publisher: Institute of Sikh Studies, Chandigarh

- Teaching Sikh Heritage to the Youth

Author: Gurbaksh Singh; Publisher: Institute of Sikh Studies, Chandigarh

- Khalsa and the 21st Century

Editor: Kharak Singh; Publisher: Institute of Sikh Studies, Chandigarh

- Dairying and Farm Diversification

Author: GBS Kahlon; Publisher: Punjab Institute for Sustainable Development, Ludhiana

In addition, he has published essays and research articles in AEN Journal, Abstracts of Sikh Studies and The Sikh Review amongst others.
