= Jaggian Kohalian =

Coordinates: 34°04′N 73°18′E

- Interactive map of Jaggian Kohalian
- Country: Pakistan
- Province: Khyber Pakhtunkhwa
- District: Abbottabad
- Tehsil: Abbottabad
- Union Council: Bagh

Population (2017)
  - Total: 2,773

Jaggian Kohalian is an area of Bagh Union Council, Abbottabad Tehsil, Abbottabad District, Khyber Pakhtunkhwa, Pakistan. According to the 2017 Census of Pakistan, the population of Jaggian Kohalian is 2,773. village bagh have tow main parts on is serian and second is bagh):)
