= Kehial =

- Country: Pakistan
- Province: Khyber Pakhtunkhwa
- District: Abbottabad
- Tehsil: Abbottabad
- Union Council: Bagh

Population (2017)
  - Total: 5,218

Kehial is an area of Bagh Union Council, Abbottabad Tehsil, Abbottabad District, Khyber Pakhtunkhwa, Pakistan. According to the 2017 Census of Pakistan, the population of Kehial is 5,218.
