= Trinjan =

Punjabi tradition of women gathering, plying 'Charkhas' and singing songs

Charkha being plied by a woman

Trinjan (Trinjan) was a Punjabi tradition of women gathering, spinning charkhas, and singing songs. It was customary in Punjabi culture, where women would sit together and engage in other domestic crafts like spinning, weaving, and singing. Trinjan was a symbol of women's strength, creativity, and emotional, cultural, ecological, and social ties.

== Spinning ==
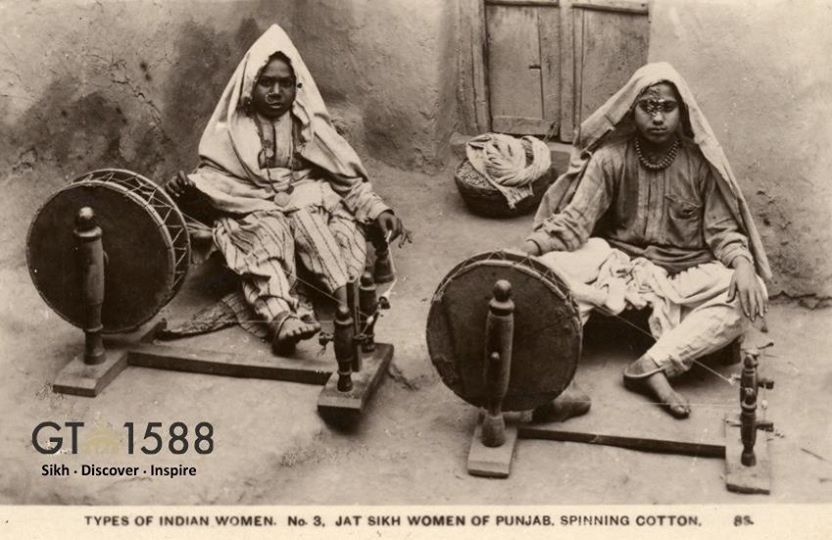
Photograph of Jat Sikh women captioned 'Types of Indian Women. No. 3, Jat Sikh Women of Punjab, Spinning Cotton. 85', 1912. No. 85 in the photograph series within the source.

Hand spinning was integrally related to Trinjan, with women spinning and singing together in groups. Trinjan has long been a place of togetherness, collaborative wisdom, and shared abilities. The night trinjan was called 'Rat Katni, ' and the day Trinjan was known as ' Chiri Charoonga .'

== Trinjan songs ==
'Trinjan' refers to assembling for activities such as plying 'Charkhas' and singing songs. Trinjan songs have a distinctive status in Punjabi folk music. Trinjan songs were an expression of contemporary women's desires and sorrows. The sound of the spinning wheel used to blend as if it was an instrument.

== Dance ==
'Trinjan' a dance type include Punjabi Giddha and Kikkli dances.

== Presently ==
These traditions began to dwindle as time passed. It has been lost as a result of industrialization, the Green Revolution, and individualism.

== Gallery ==
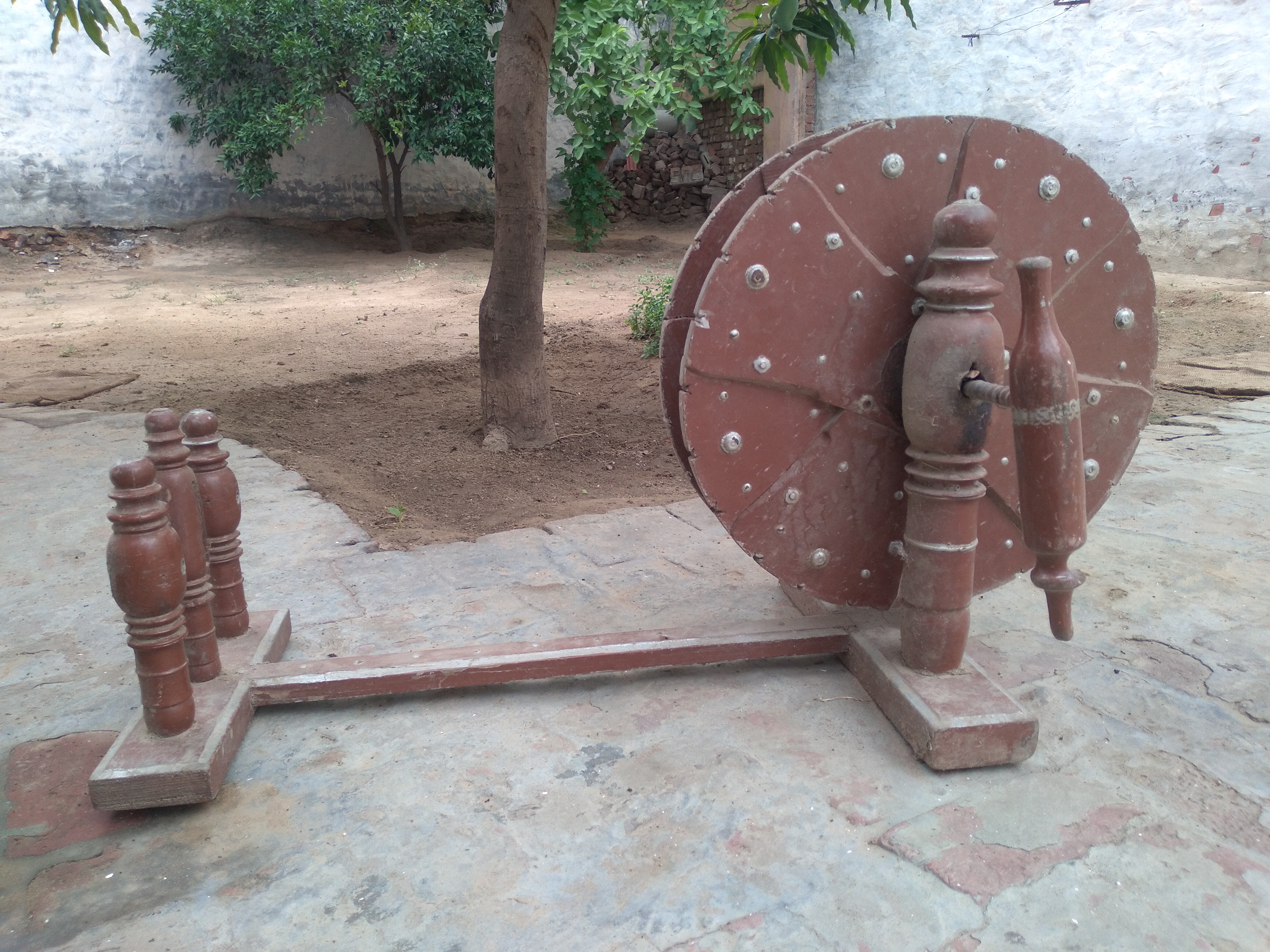
Punjabi spinning wheel 'Charkha'

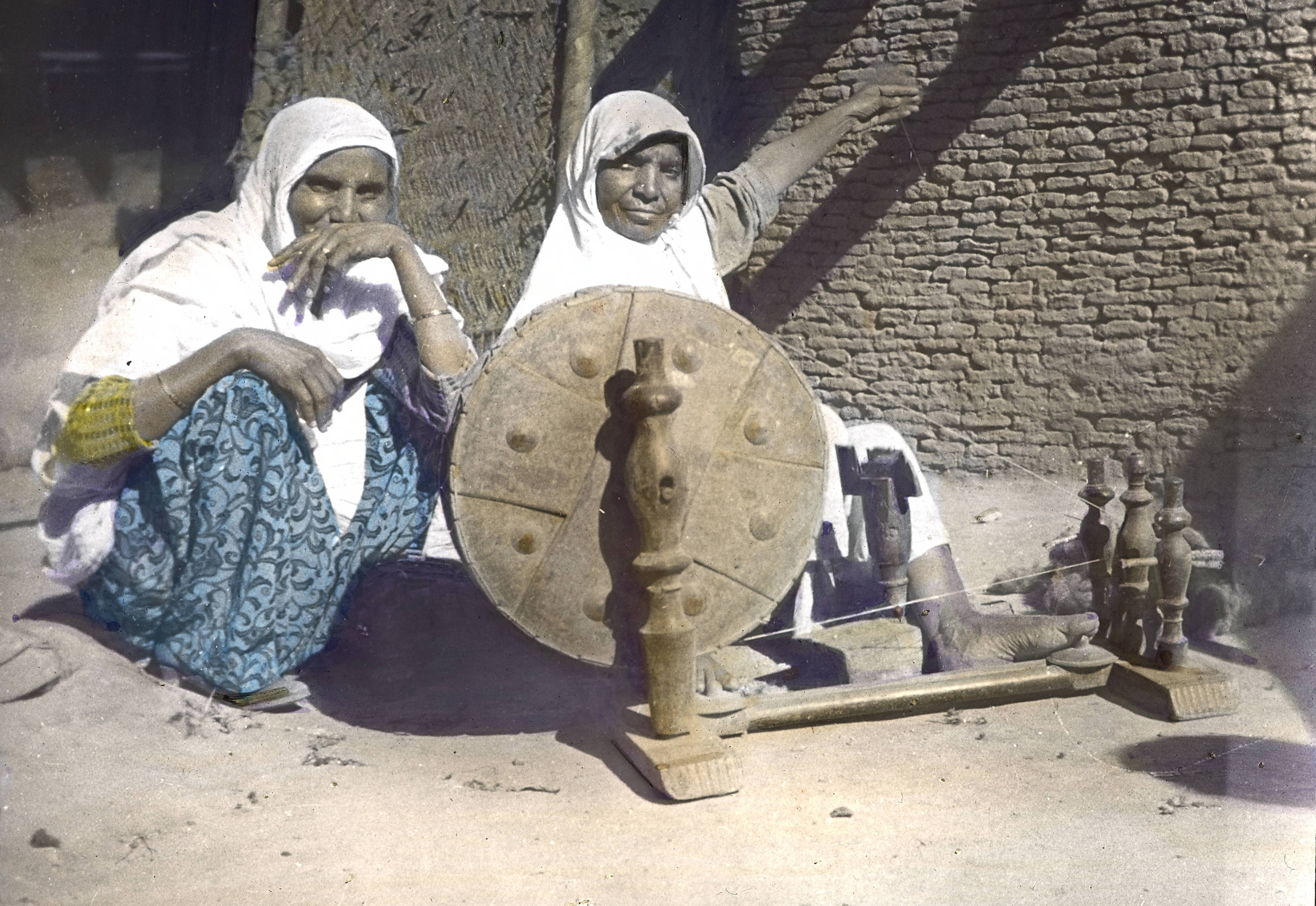
Two women with Charkha

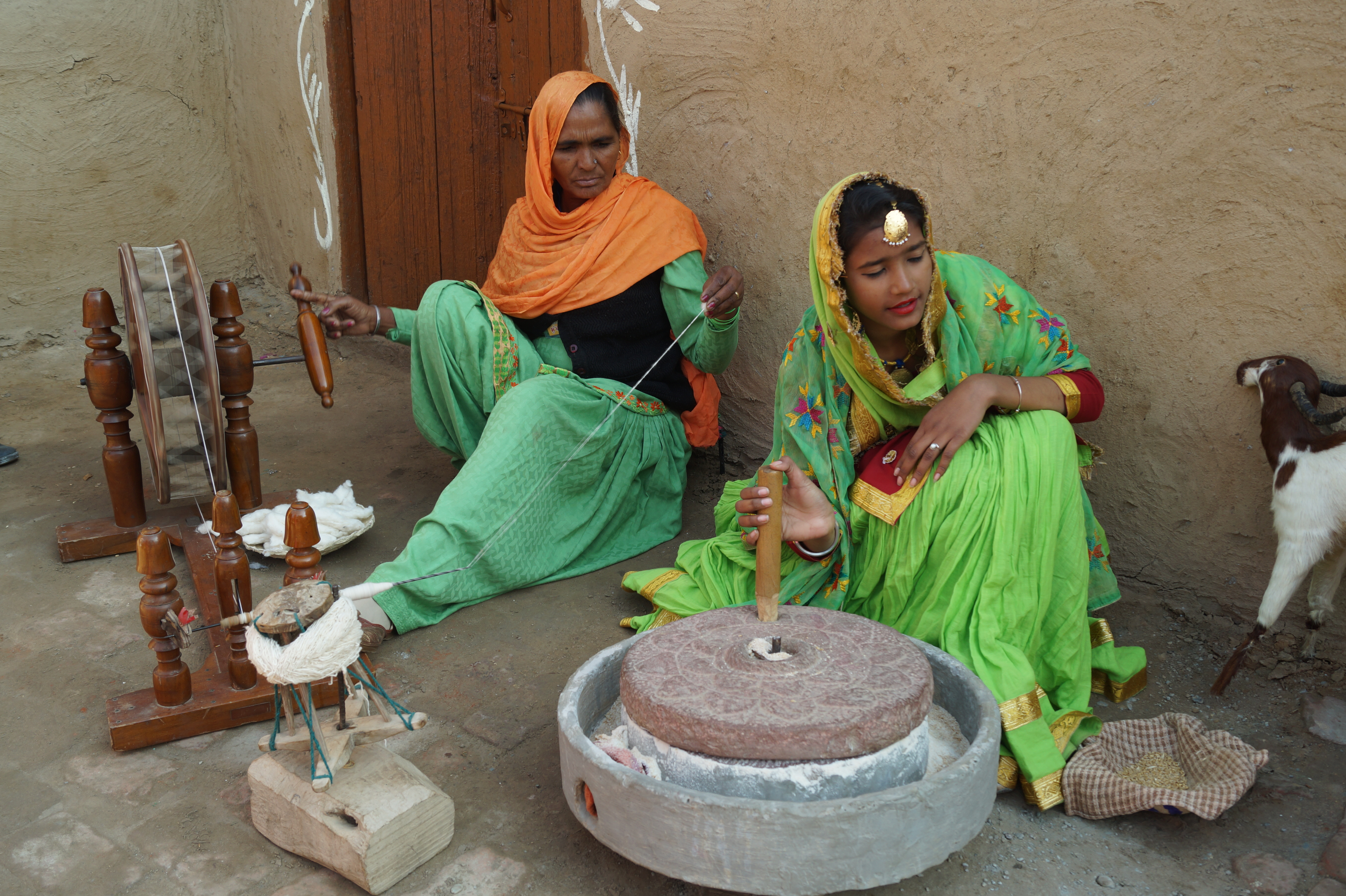
Charkha

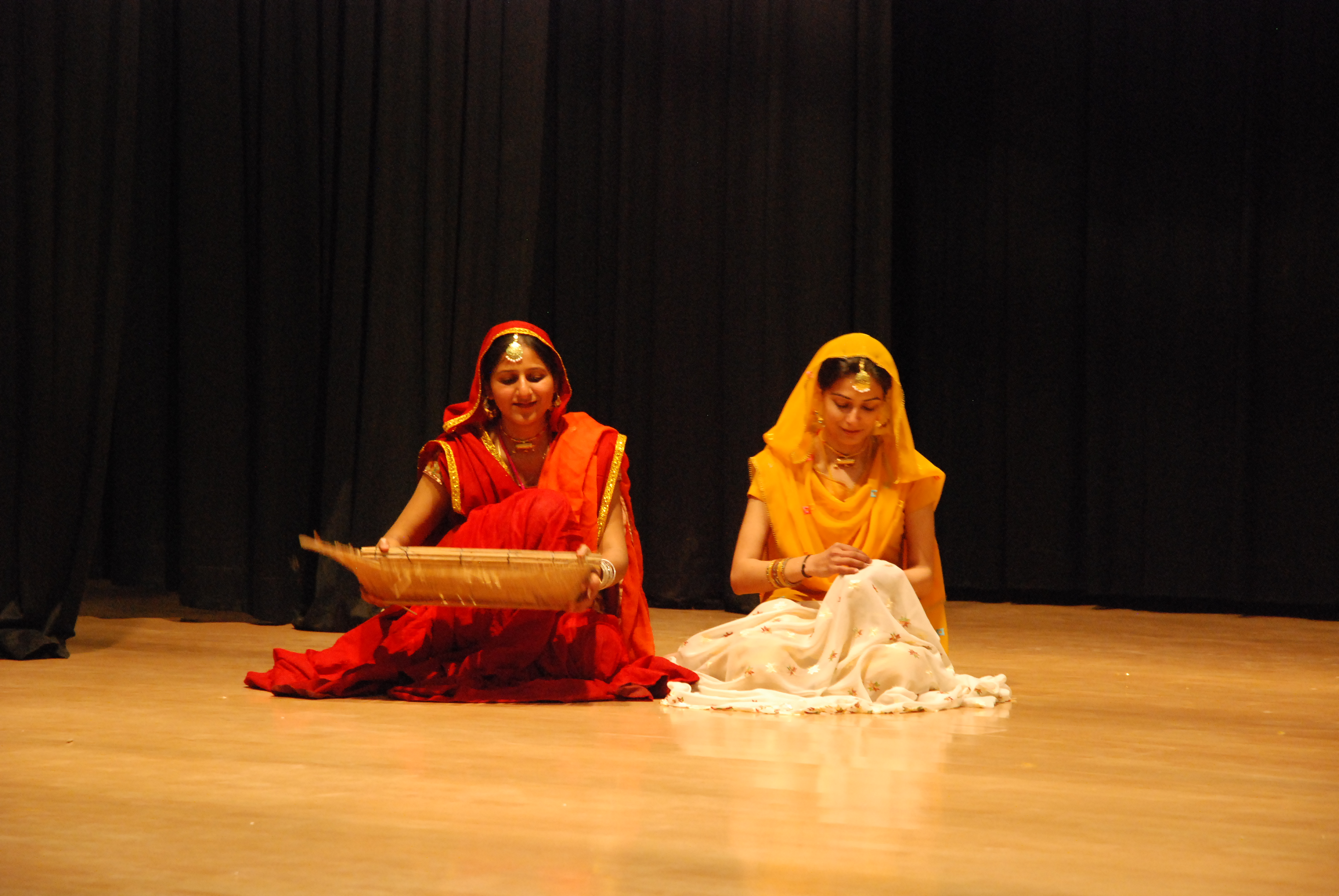
Act in Giddha

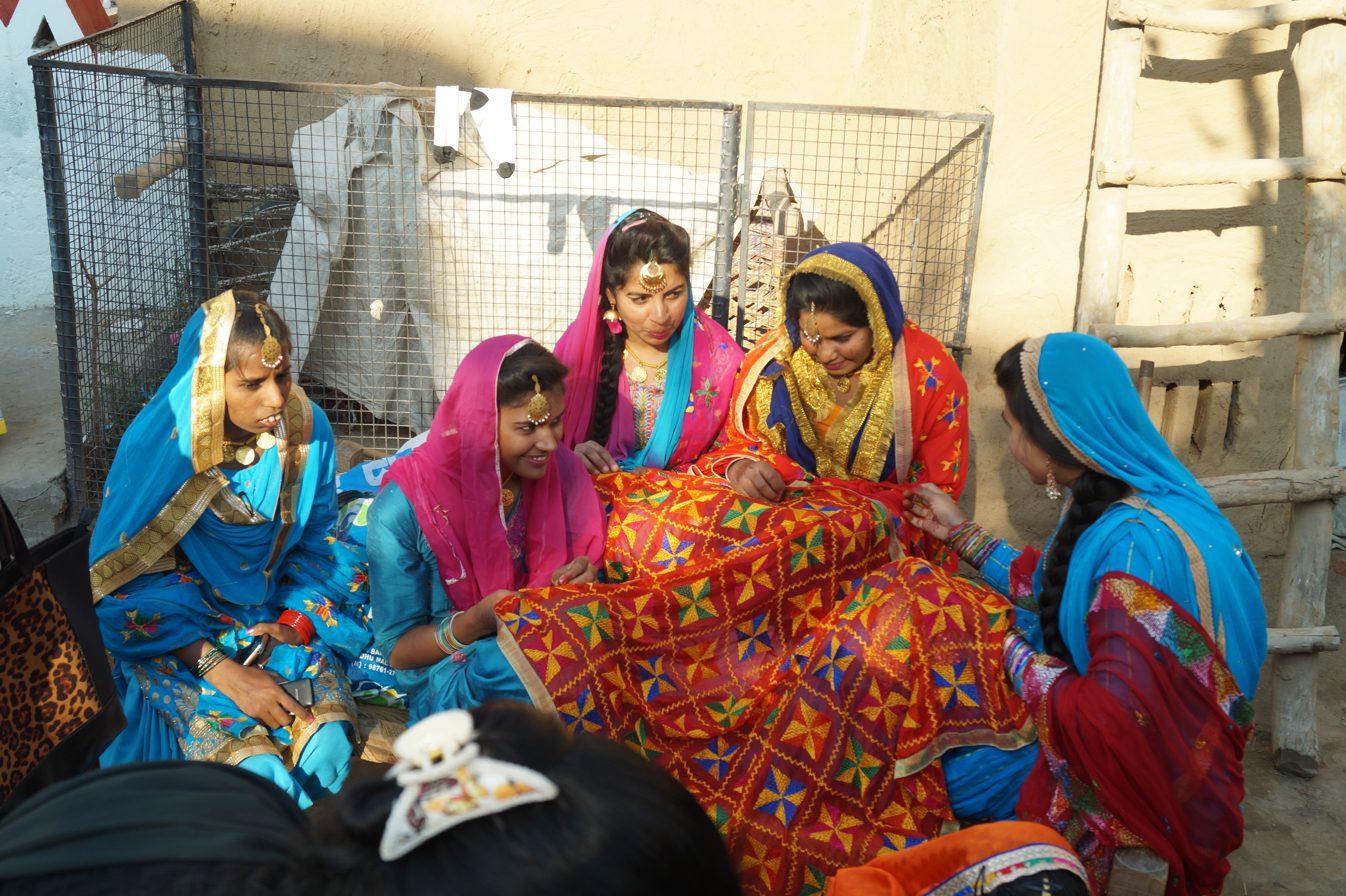
Virasti Mela, Bathinda (Punjabi Heritage Festival)

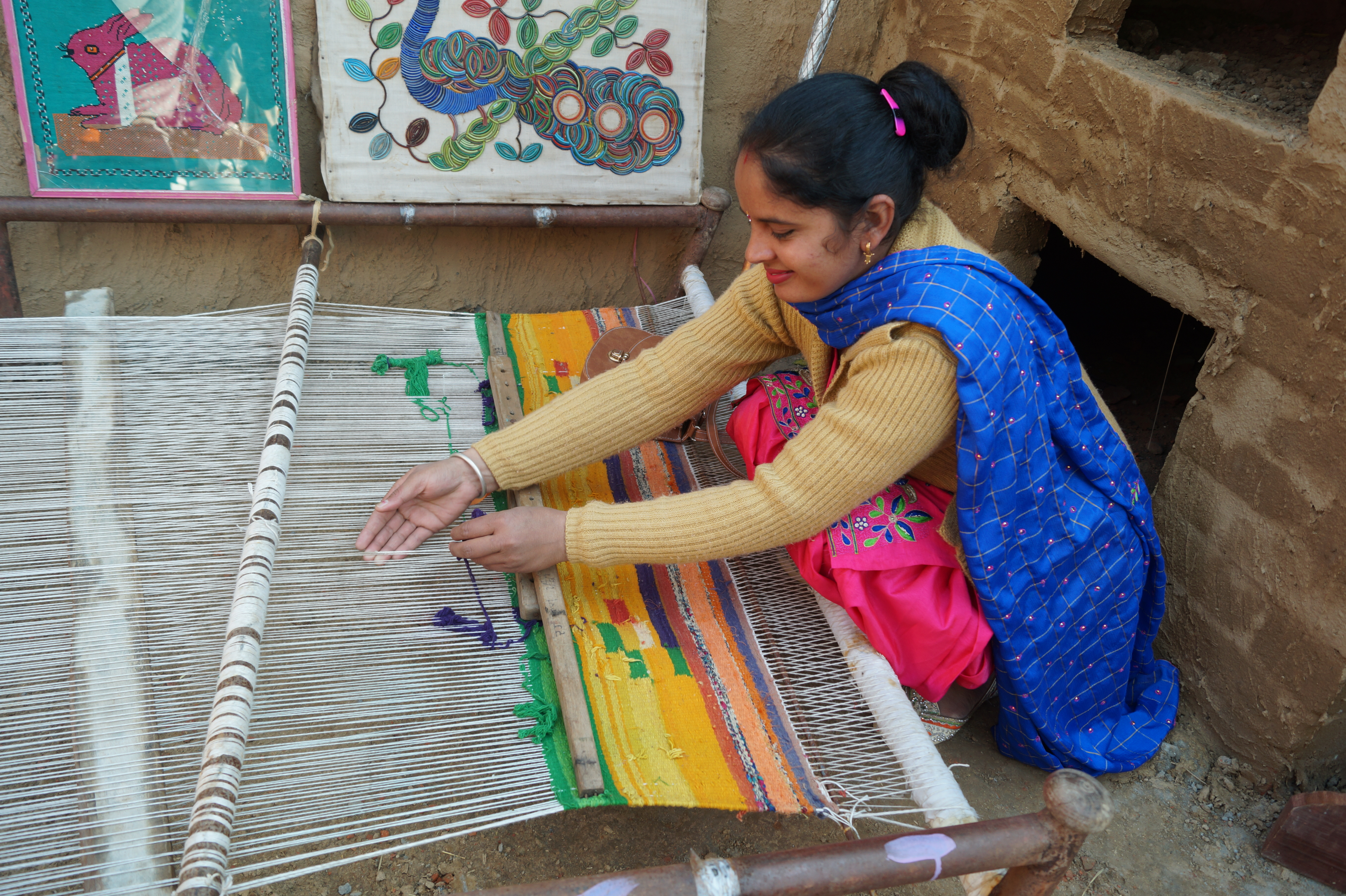
Virasti Mela, Bathinda (Punjabi Heritage Festival)

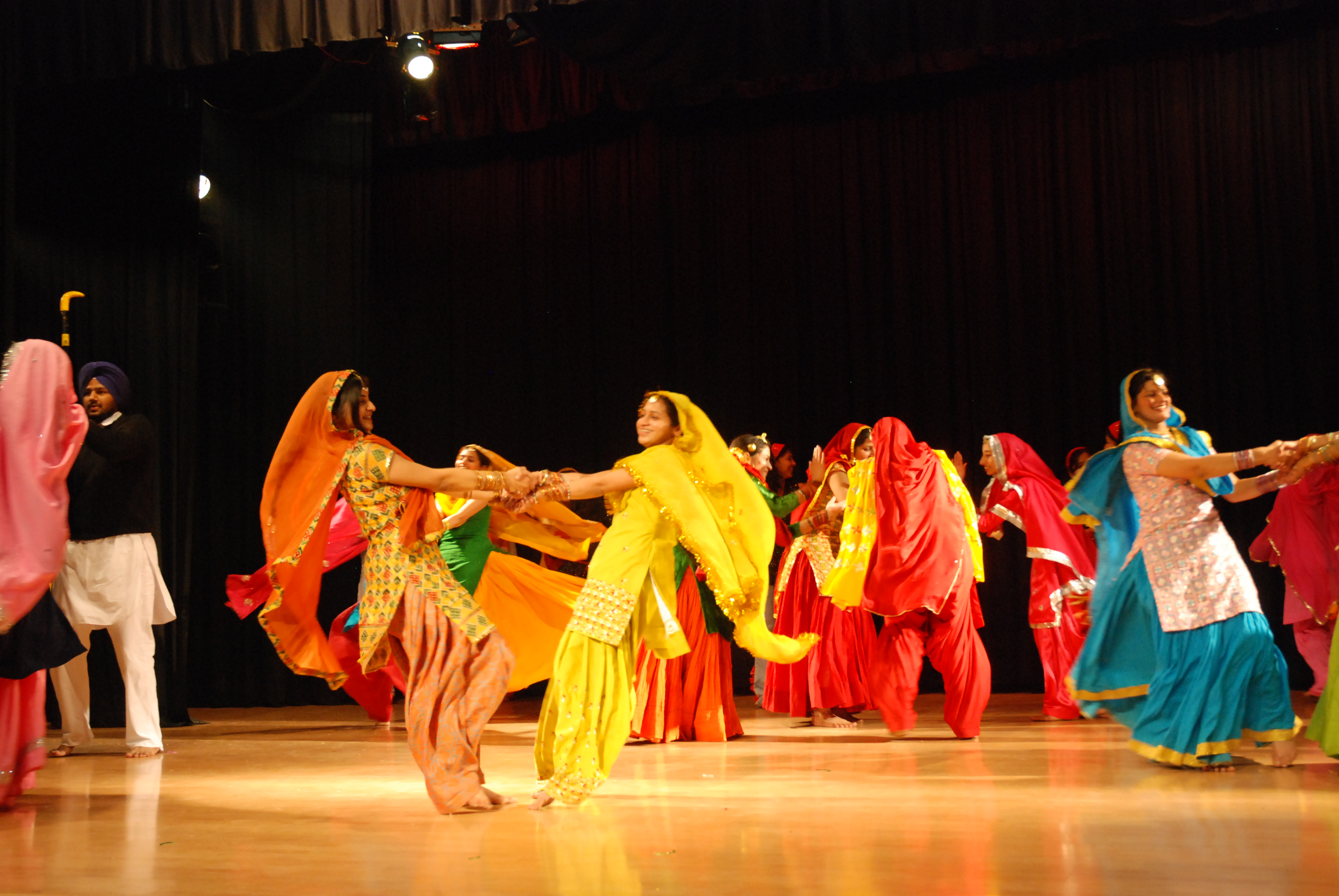
Kikkli

== See also ==
- Spinning wheel
- Phulkari
