= Bagh-e Olya =

Bagh-e Olya (Persian: باغ عليا) may refer to:

- Bagh-e Olya, Lorestan
- Bagh-e Olya, West Azerbaijan
