= Gachin-e Pain =

Gachin-e Pain گچين پايين
- Village
- Location within Iran
- Coordinates: 27°05′32″N 55°53′21″E
- Country: Iran
- Province: Hormozgan
- County: Bandar Abbas
- Bakhsh: Central
- Rural District: Gachin

Population (2006)
  - Total: 2,376
- Time zone: UTC+3:30 (IRST)
  - Summer (DST): UTC+4:30 (IRDT)

Gachin-e Pain (Persian: گچين پايين, also Romanized as Gachīn-e Pā’īn) is a village in Gachin Rural District, in the Central District of Bandar Abbas County, Hormozgan Province, Iran. At the 2006 census, its population was 2,376, in 427 families.
