= Dashti, Fars =

Village in Fars province, Iran

Dashti Persian: دشتي
- Village
- Location within Iran
- Coordinates: 27°29′41″N 54°09′15″E
- Country: Iran
- Province: Fars
- County: Larestan
- District: Sahray-ye Bagh
- Rural District: Sahray-ye Bagh

Population (2016)
  - Total: 1,522
- Time zone: UTC+3:30 (IRST)

Dashti (Persian: دشتي) (Note: Also romanized as Dashtī) is a village in Sahray-ye Bagh Rural District of Sahray-ye Bagh District, Larestan County, (Note: Formerly Lar County) Fars province, Iran.

== Demographics ==
=== Population ===
At the time of the 2006 National Census, the village's population was 1,421 in 339 households. The following census in 2011 counted 1,565 people in 371 households. The 2016 census measured the population of the village as 1,522 people in 407 households. It was the most populous village in its rural district.
