= Mogh Ahmad-e Bala =

Mogh Ahmad-e Bala مغ احمدبالا
- Village
- Location within Iran
- Coordinates: 27°09′15″N 55°52′44″E
- Country: Iran
- Province: Hormozgan
- County: Bandar Abbas
- Bakhsh: Central
- Rural District: Gachin

Population (2006)
  - Total: 584
- Time zone: UTC+3:30 (IRST)
  - Summer (DST): UTC+4:30 (IRDT)

Mogh Ahmad-e Bala (Persian: مغ احمدبالا, also Romanized as Mogh Aḩmad-e Bālā) is a village in Gachin Rural District, in the Central District of Bandar Abbas County, Hormozgan Province, Iran. At the 2006 census, its population was 584, in 121 families.
