= Mogh Ahmad-e Pain =

Mogh Ahmad-e Pain مغ احمدپائين
- Village
- Location within Iran
- Coordinates: 27°09′28″N 55°53′25″E
- Country: Iran
- Province: Hormozgan
- County: Bandar Abbas
- Bakhsh: Central
- Rural District: Gachin

Population (2006)
  - Total: 440
- Time zone: UTC+3:30 (IRST)
  - Summer (DST): UTC+4:30 (IRDT)

Mogh Ahmad-e Pain (Persian: مغ احمدپائين, also Romanized as Mogh Aḩmad-e Pā'īn; also known as Mogh Aḩmad and Mugh Ahmad) is a village in Gachin Rural District, in the Central District of Bandar Abbas County, Hormozgan Province, Iran. At the 2006 census, its population was 440, in 92 families.
