= Bagha =

Bagha or Bagga may refer to:

== People ==
- Bagga, an Indian surname
- Bagha Jatin (Jatindranath Mukherjee, 1879–1915), Indian freedom fighter
- Sahir Ali Bagga (born 1978), Pakistani singer, music director and composer
- Simran Bagga (born 1976), Indian film actress
- Bagheshwar "Bagha" Daddu Undhaiwala, fictional character portrayed by Tanmay Vekaria in the Indian sitcom Taarak Mehta Ka Ooltah Chashmah

== Places ==
- Bagha Upazila, an administrative region in Bangladesh
- Bagha, Hormozgan, a village in Hormozgan Province, Iran
- Bagha, Razavi Khorasan, a village in Razavi Khorasan Province, Iran

== Other uses ==
- Bagha Mosque, near Rajshahi, Bangladesh
- Bagha Byne, a character in the Indian Goopy–Bagha film series by Satyajit Ray

== See also ==
- Bagh (disambiguation)
- Baghin (disambiguation)
- Bagheera (disambiguation)
- Bagaha, a city and municipality in Bihar, India
