= Bagh-e Bala, Narmashir =

Bagh-e Bala باغ بالا
- Village
- Location within Iran
- Coordinates: 28°50′22″N 58°30′51″E
- Country: Iran
- Province: Kerman
- County: Narmashir
- Bakhsh: Rud Ab
- Rural District: Rud Ab-e Gharbi

Population (2006)
  - Total: 884
- Time zone: UTC+3:30 (IRST)
  - Summer (DST): UTC+4:30 (IRDT)

Bagh-e Bala (Persian: باغ بالا, also Romanized as Bāgh-e Bālā and Bāgh Bālā) is a village in Rud Ab-e Gharbi Rural District, Rud Ab District, Narmashir County, Kerman Province, Iran. At the 2006 census, its population was 884, in 193 families.
