= Bagh-e Sofla, West Azerbaijan =

Bagh-e Sofla باغ سفلي
- Village
- Location within Iran
- Coordinates: 36°26′05″N 46°35′50″E
- Country: Iran
- Province: West Azerbaijan
- County: Shahin Dezh
- Bakhsh: Central
- Rural District: Safa Khaneh

Population (2006)
  - Total: 250
- Time zone: UTC+3:30 (IRST)
  - Summer (DST): UTC+4:30 (IRDT)

Bagh-e Sofla (Persian: باغ سفلي, also Romanized as Bāgh-e Soflá) is a village in Safa Khaneh Rural District, in the Central District of Shahin Dezh County, West Azerbaijan Province, Iran. At the 2006 census, its population was 250, in 59 families.
