= Khasali, Iran =

Khasali خاص علي
- Village
- Location within Iran
- Coordinates: 33°52′00″N 47°35′00″E
- Country: Iran
- Province: Lorestan
- County: Kuhdasht
- Bakhsh: Central
- Rural District: Kuhdasht-e Shomali

Population (2006)
  - Total: 107
- Time zone: UTC+3:30 (IRST)
  - Summer (DST): UTC+4:30 (IRDT)

Khasali (Persian: خاص علي, also Romanized as Khāş‘alī; also known as Bāgh-e Bālā) is a village in Kuhdasht-e Shomali Rural District, in the Central District of Kuhdasht County, Lorestan Province, Iran. At the 2006 census, its population was 107, in 26 families.
