= Bagh, Lorestan =

Bagh باغ
- Village
- Location within Iran
- Coordinates: 33°28′45″N 48°51′50″E
- Country: Iran
- Province: Lorestan
- County: Khorramabad
- Bakhsh: Zagheh
- Rural District: Qaedrahmat

Population (2006)
  - Total: 131
- Time zone: UTC+3:30 (IRST)
  - Summer (DST): UTC+4:30 (IRDT)

Bagh (Persian: باغ, also Romanized as Bāgh) is a village in Qaedrahmat Rural District, Zagheh District, Khorramabad County, Lorestan Province, Iran. At the 2006 census, its population was 131, in 25 families.
