= Bagh-e Bala, Baghlan =

Bagh-e Bala
- Location in Afghanistan
- Coordinates: 35°36′7″N 69°12′27″E
- Country: Afghanistan
- Province: Baghlan Province
- Time zone: + 4.30

Bagh-e Bala is a village in Baghlan Province in north eastern Afghanistan.

== See also ==
- Baghlan Province
