= Baghini (2019 film) =

2019 film by Nehal Dutt

- Directed by: Nehal Dutta
- Produced by: Pinky Paul
- Starring: Ruma Chakraborty, Falguni Chaterjee, Pradeep Dhar, Partha Chakraborty, Shuvomoy Chaterjee, Subrata Guho Roy, Rahul Chakraborty, Anjan Paul, Ananya Guho
- Release date: 24 May 2019
- Country: India
- Language: Bangla

Baghini (English: The Tigress) is an Indian Bangla film which is based on the life of the Chief Minister of West Bengal Mamata Banerjee. The release of the film was postponed several times, with the final release date set for 24 May 2019.

== Cast ==
- Ruma Chakraborty - Indira Banarjee
- Falguni Chaterjee
- Pradeep Dhar
- Partha Chakraborty
- Shuvomoy Chaterjee
- Subrata Guho Roy
- Rahul Chakraborty
- Anjan Paul
- Ananya Guho

== Production ==
In 2016, Nehal Dutt announced that he would direct a film based on the life of Mamata Banarjee. It was also announced that Ruma Chakraborty would act as the main character, called Indira Banerjee. A trailer was released in April 2019, and the director stated that the film would open in early May of the same year, a date that was postponed to 24 May due to the general elections in West Bengal. The original release had been planned for 2016.
