= Sahray-ye Bagh Rural District =

Rural district in Fars province, Iran

Sahray-ye Bagh Rural District Persian: دهستان صحرای باغ
- Rural District
- Location within Iran
- Coordinates: 27°29′07″N 54°09′49″E
- Country: Iran
- Province: Fars
- County: Larestan
- District: Sahray-ye Bagh
- Capital: Bagh

Population (2016)
  - Total: 7,007
- Time zone: UTC+3:30 (IRST)

Sahray-ye Bagh Rural District (Persian: دهستان صحرای باغ) is in Sahray-ye Bagh District of Larestan County, (Note: Formerly Lar County) Fars province, Iran. Its capital is the village of Bagh.

== Demographics ==
=== Population ===
At the time of the 2006 National Census, the rural district's population was 6,576 in 1,418 households. There were 6,277 inhabitants in 1,471 households at the following census of 2011. The 2016 census measured the population of the rural district as 7,007 in 1,858 households. The most populous of its 36 villages was Dashti, with 1,522 people.
