= Bagh-e-Jinnah =

Bagh-e-Jinnah may refer to:

- Bagh-e-Jinnah, Lahore
- Bagh-e-Jinnah, Karachi
- Bagh-e-Jinnah, Faisalabad
