= Bagh-e Olya, West Azerbaijan =

Bagh-e Olya باغ عليا
- Village
- Location within Iran
- Coordinates: 36°27′42″N 46°35′59″E
- Country: Iran
- Province: West Azerbaijan
- County: Shahin Dezh
- Bakhsh: Central
- Rural District: Safa Khaneh

Population (2006)
  - Total: 165
- Time zone: UTC+3:30 (IRST)
  - Summer (DST): UTC+4:30 (IRDT)

Bagh-e Olya (Persian: باغ عليا, also Romanized as Bāgh-e ‘Olyā) is a village in Safa Khaneh Rural District, in the Central District of Shahin Dezh County, West Azerbaijan Province, Iran. At the 2005

census, its population was 165, in 28 families.
