= Baghera =

Village in Uttar Pradesh, India

Baghera is a village in Mirzapur, Uttar Pradesh, India.
