= Bagh, Abbottabad =

Bagh باغ
- Coordinates: 34.098549°N 73.298667°E
- Country: Pakistan
- Province: Khyber Pakhtunkhwa
- District: Abbottabad
- Tehsil: Abbottabad
- Union Council: Bagh

Population (2017)
  - Total: 10,028

Bagh is the principle settlement of the Union Council that bears its name located in Abbottabad Tehsil, Abbottabad District, Khyber Pakhtunkhwa, Pakistan. According to the 2017 Census of Pakistan, the population of Bagh is 10,028. un bagh have 3 vc one is bagh which is largest vc of un bagh village serian is also part of vc bagh its population is 10,028 including population of village Serian which is 3000
