= Bagh, Larestan =

Village in Fars province, Iran

Bagh Persian: باغ
- Village
- Location within Iran
- Coordinates: 27°29′58″N 54°01′51″E
- Country: Iran
- Province: Fars
- County: Larestan
- District: Sahray-ye Bagh
- Rural District: Sahray-ye Bagh

Population (2016)
  - Total: 1,426
- Time zone: UTC+3:30 (IRST)

Bagh (Persian: باغ) (Note: Also romanized as Bāgh) is a village in, and the capital of, Sahray-ye Bagh Rural District of Sahray-ye Bagh District, Larestan County, (Note: Formerly Lar County) Fars province, Iran.

== Demographics ==
=== Population ===
At the time of the 2006 National Census, the village's population was 1,236 in 230 households. The following census in 2011 counted 1,066 people in 257 households. The 2016 census measured the population of the village as 1,426 people in 369 households.
