= Gachin-e Bala =

Village in Hormozgan province, Iran

Gachin-e Bala Persian: گچين بالا
- Village
- Location within Iran
- Coordinates: 27°07′32″N 55°52′26″E
- Country: Iran
- Province: Hormozgan
- County: Bandar Abbas
- District: Central
- Rural District: Gachin

Population (2016)
  - Total: 3,936
- Time zone: UTC+3:30 (IRST)

Gachin-e Bala (Persian: گچين بالا) (Note: Also romanized as Gāchin Bāla and Gachīn-e Bālā; also known as Gachin Olya and Gachīn-e ‘Olyā) is a village in, and the capital of, Gachin Rural District of the Central District of Bandar Abbas County, Hormozgan province, Iran.

== Demographics ==
=== Population ===
At the time of the 2006 National Census, the village's population was 3,146 in 688 households. The following census in 2011 counted 3,782 people in 995 households. The 2016 census measured the population of the village as 3,936 people in 1,087 households. It was the most populous village in its rural district.
