= Bagh, Khuzestan =

Bagh باغ
- Village
- Location within Iran
- Coordinates: 32°53′49″N 48°48′45″E
- Country: Iran
- Province: Khuzestan
- County: Dezful
- Bakhsh: Sardasht
- Rural District: Emamzadeh Seyyed Mahmud

Population (2006)
  - Total: 40
- Time zone: UTC+3:30 (IRST)
  - Summer (DST): UTC+4:30 (IRDT)

Bagh (Persian: باغ, also romanized as Bāgh) is a village in Emamzadeh Seyyed Mahmud Rural District, Sardasht District, Dezful County, Khuzestan Province, Iran. At the 2006 census, its population was 40, in 6 families.
