= Bagh Chamak =

Bagh Chamak باغچمك
- Village
- Location within Iran
- Coordinates: 29°08′12″N 58°16′20″E
- Country: Iran
- Province: Kerman
- County: Bam
- Bakhsh: Central
- Rural District: Howmeh

Population (2006)
  - Total: 1,013
- Time zone: UTC+3:30 (IRST)
  - Summer (DST): UTC+4:30 (IRDT)

Bagh Chamak (Persian: باغچمك, also Romanized as Bāgh Chamak and Bāghchemak; also known as Bāgh) is a village in Howmeh Rural District, in the Central District of Bam County, Kerman Province, Iran. At the 2006 census, its population was 1,013, in 249 families.
