= Bagh-e Sofla, Lorestan =

Village in Lorestan province, Iran

Bagh-e Sofla Persian: باغ سفلي
- Village
- Location within Iran
- Coordinates: 33°07′39″N 47°37′57″E
- Country: Iran
- Province: Lorestan
- County: Pol-e Dokhtar
- District: Central
- Rural District: Jayedar-e Shomali

Population (2016)
  - Total: 83
- Time zone: UTC+3:30 (IRST)

Bagh-e Sofla (Persian: باغ سفلي) (Note: Also romanized as Bāgh-e Soflá; also known as Bāgh and Bāgh-e Jāydar-e Soflá) is a village in Jayedar-e Shomali Rural District (Note: Formerly Jayedar Rural District) of the Central District in Pol-e Dokhtar County, Lorestan province, Iran.

== Demographics ==
=== Population ===
At the time of the 2006 National Census, the village's population was 215 in 41 households. The following census in 2011 counted 117 people in 27 households. The 2016 census measured the population of the village as 83 people in 25 households.
