= Bagh Union Council, Abbottabad =

Administrative subdivision or Union Council in Pakistan

Coordinates: 34°12′30″N 73°29′0″E

Bagh باغ
- Union Council
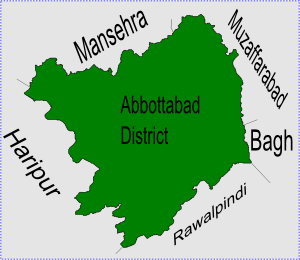
- Bagh Union Council is located in Abbottabad District
- Interactive map of Bagh
- Country: Pakistan
- Province: Khyber Pakhtunkhwa
- District: Abbottabad
- Tehsil: Abbottabad

Population (2017 Census of Pakistan)
  - Total: 18,019

Bagh is a union council of Abbottabad District in Khyber-Pakhtunkhwa province of Pakistan, it has two high schools GHS Bagh and GMS Kehial The main tribe of this area are the Jadun and the Dhund Abbasis. According to the 2023 census the total population was 11,525 of which 5,941 were male and 5,584 were female.

== Location ==
It is located in the centre of the district, in the southern part of Abbottabad Tehsil, it is bounded by the following union councils, to the north and east by Dhamtour, to the north by Sarbhana, to the east by Bagnotar, Namli Maira and Nagri Bala - and to the south by Dewal Manal.

== Subdivisions ==
The Union Council is divided into four areas: Bagh, (Khakhwala ) Kehial and Jaggian Kohalian.
