= Baghan, Jask =

Baghan باغان
- Village
- Location within Iran
- Coordinates: 25°47′59″N 57°38′02″E
- Country: Iran
- Province: Hormozgan
- County: Jask
- Bakhsh: Central
- Rural District: Jask

Population (2006)
  - Total: 178
- Time zone: UTC+3:30 (IRST)
  - Summer (DST): UTC+4:30 (IRDT)

Baghan (Persian: باغان, also Romanized as Bāghān; also known as Bāgheyn and Bāghīn) is a village in Jask Rural District, in the Central District of Jask County, Hormozgan Province, Iran. At the 2006 census, its population was 178, in 29 families.
