= Phulkari =

Folk embroidery of the Punjab

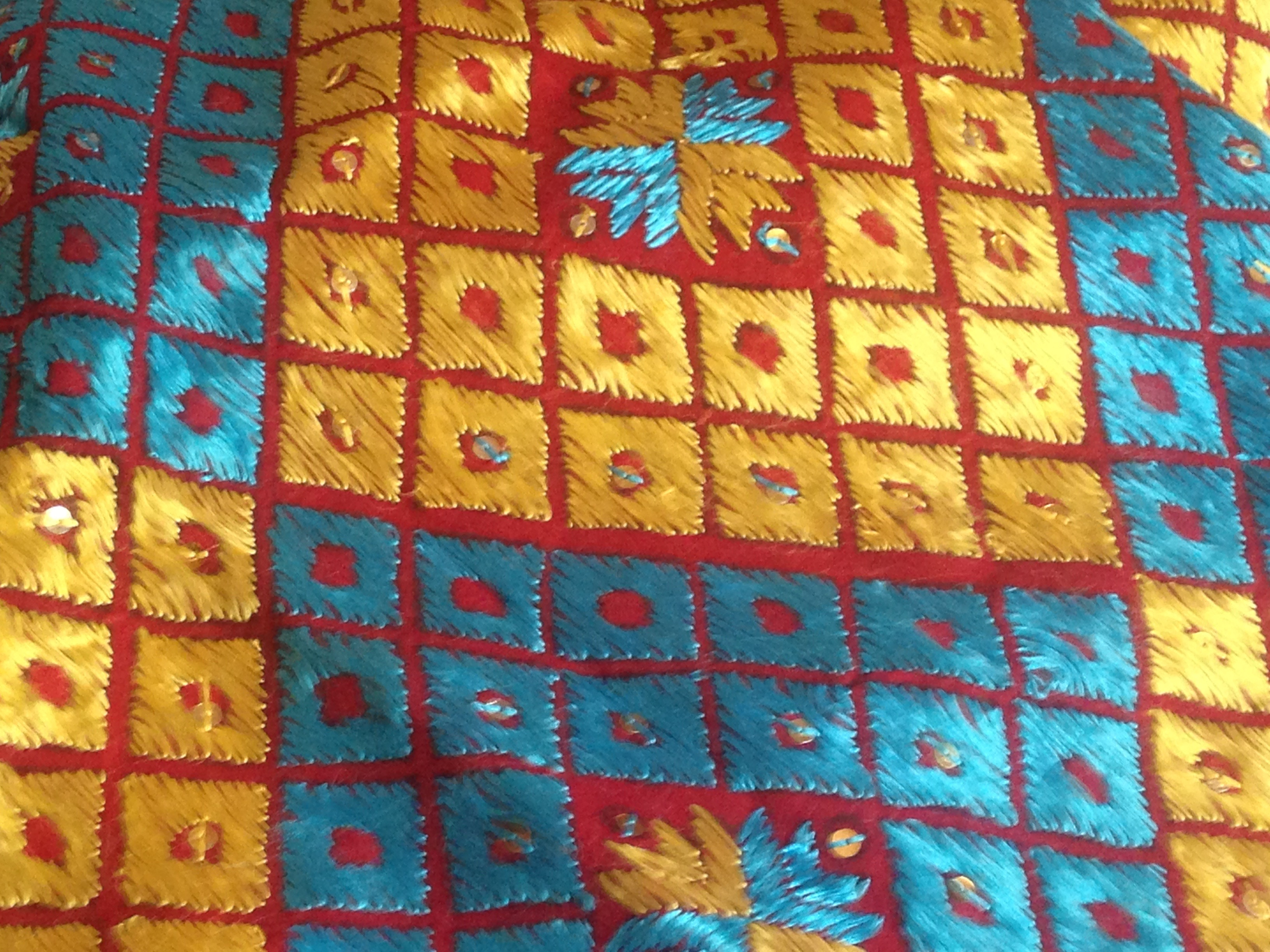
Contemporary Phulkari design and embroidery at retail dealer's store in Patiala, Punjab (India), 2015

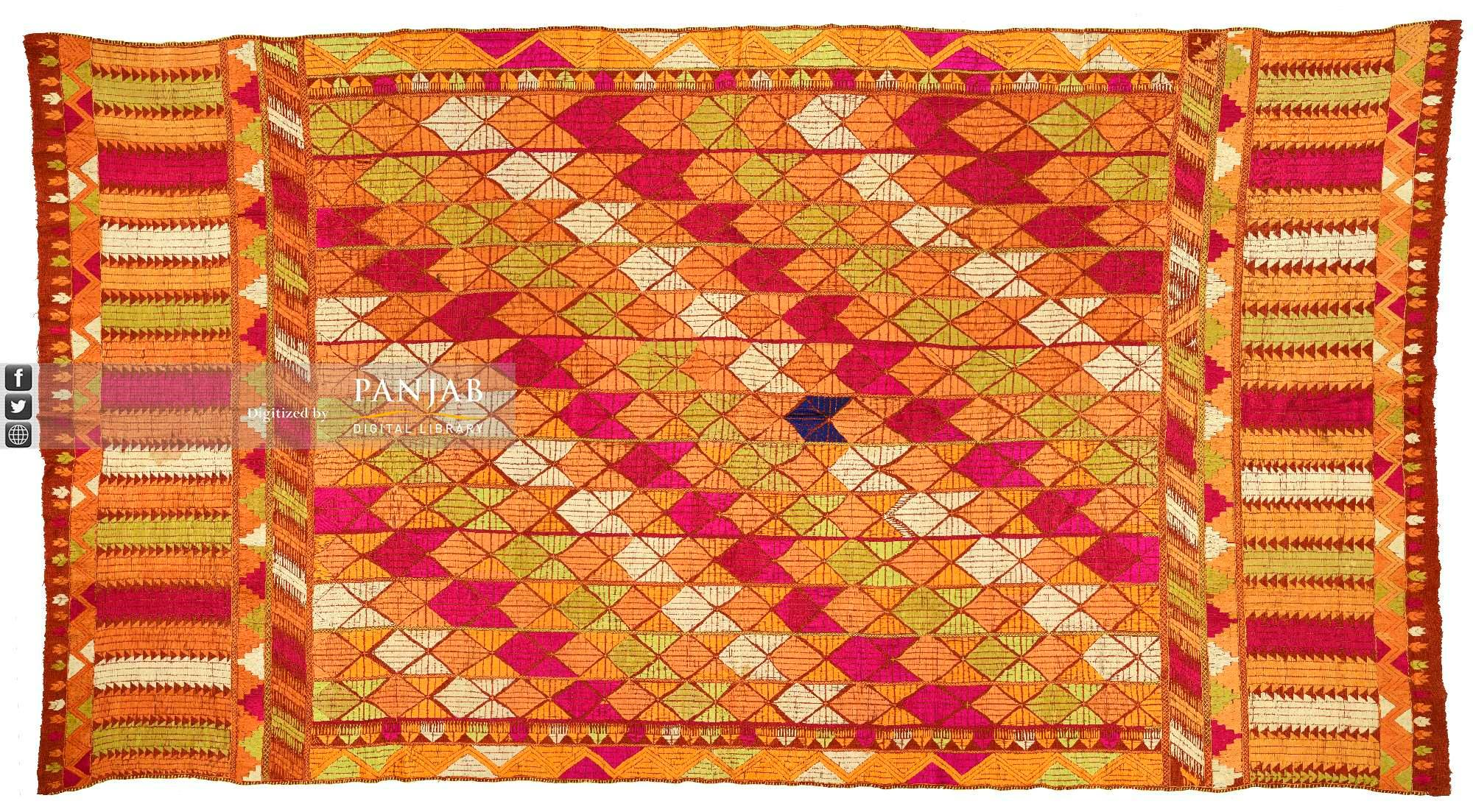
Handwoven Bagh (fully embroidered) design from Punjab

Phulkari (Gurmukhi: ਫੁਲਕਾਰੀ; Shahmukhi: پھلکاری, meaning "art of flowers") is the folk embroidery of the Punjab region and Gulkari of Sindh in South Asia. It is an artwork traditionally created by women.

Although phulkari means 'floral work', the designs include not only flowers but also cover motifs and geometrical shapes. The main characteristics of phulkari embroidery are the use of darn stitch on the wrong side of coarse cotton cloth with coloured silken thread.

Traditional phulkaris are large items of cloth and in the broad sense include chope, tilpatr, neelak, and bagh. In the narrow sense, a phulkari is specifically a shawl sparingly embroidered with flowers, where the base cloth is still visible, while an intricately embroidered flower pattern that covers the entire garment is a bagh ('garden').

The craft of phulkari has undergone changes over the centuries. According to Pal (1960), the traditional method of embroidering a phulkari and its widespread use in Punjab, India, declined by the 1950s. Traditionally, women would embroider phulkaris without using stencils. Pal (1960) states that women would clean their courtyards and invite friends and family to ceremonially begin the process of embroidering a phulkari. Folk songs would be sung on this occasion. "Ih Phulkari Meri Maan Ne Kadhi / Is Noo Ghut Ghut Japhiyan Paawan" ('This Phulkari was embroidered by my mother; I embrace it warmly'). Folk songs like these are indicative of the emotional attachment the girl had to the Phulkari embroidered by her mother or grandmother, or aunts.

Phulkari and bagh embroidery have influenced the embroidery of Gujarat known as heer bharat in its use of geometrical motifs and stitchery. Historically, these art forms were practised in the villages of Punjab. The arts of phulkari and bagh are in decline in the 21st century, and fewer women know how to create them.

== Etymology ==
Phulkari is made of two words: phul means 'flower' and akari means 'shape'. Phulkari meant the shape/direction of flowers which symbolized life. In Punjab, it was popularly believed that the birth of a girl child in the family was auspicious. The mother and grandmothers would start embroidering Phulkari dupattas upon her birth because they believed that she would be the creator for future generations. Originally, Phulkari was done with real flowers. Traditionally, phulkari was embroidered on khaddar, a coarse handspun and handwoven cotton, using pat, an unplied silk thread usually imported from China.

== Origin ==
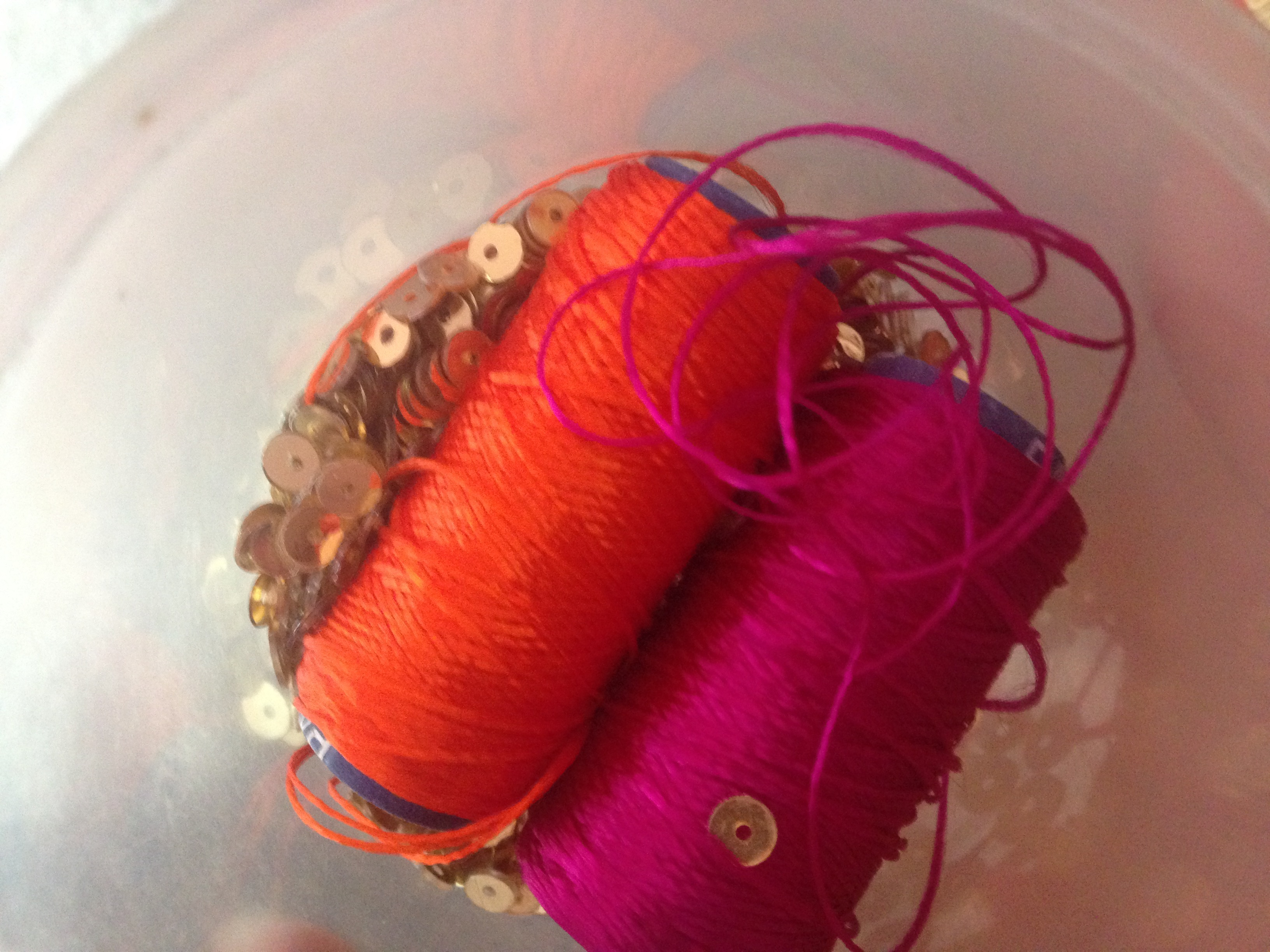
Silk embroidery floss (Patt), Rajpura Punjab (India), 2015

There are different theories about the origin of phulkari. One such belief is that this embroidery was prevalent in different parts of the country as far back as the 7th century CE but survived only in Punjab. Motifs similar to the ones found in Phulkari are also found in Kashida of Bihar and some of the embroideries of Rajasthan. Another thought is that this style of embroidery came from Iran, where it was called Gulkari, also meaning floral work. However, Pal (1960) notes that the styles of Phulkari are distinct from Gulkari work.

There is reference to phulkari in ancient texts, folk legends, and the literature of Punjab. In Harishcharitra, the biography of the Emperor Harshavardhana (590-647 CE), the last ruler of the great ancient Indian Vardhana empire, the seventh-century chronicler Bana wrote, "Some people were embroidering flowers and leaves on the cloth from the reverse side," which is a technical description of Phulkari embroidery.

However, the earliest reference to the word phulkari is in Punjabi literature in the 18th century Waris Shah's version of Heer Ranjha, a legendary Punjabi tragic romance, which describes the wedding trousseau of the female protagonist Heer and lists various clothing items with phulkari embroidery. The first extensive English publication on phulkari was by Flora Annie Steel in 1880 where she describes the various styles and exhibited the varieties in picture form. In its present form, phulkari embroidery has been popular since the 15th century. Pal (1960) believes that no matter its origin, phulkari work is distinctive and uniquely Punjabi.

According to Kanwarjit Singh Kang, there are two general theories about its origins: (1) It arrived in the Punjab due to Gujjars and Central Asians settling in the area, (2) Brought to the region from Muslims from Iran who settled in Kashmir and Punjab.

== Features ==
=== Fabrics ===
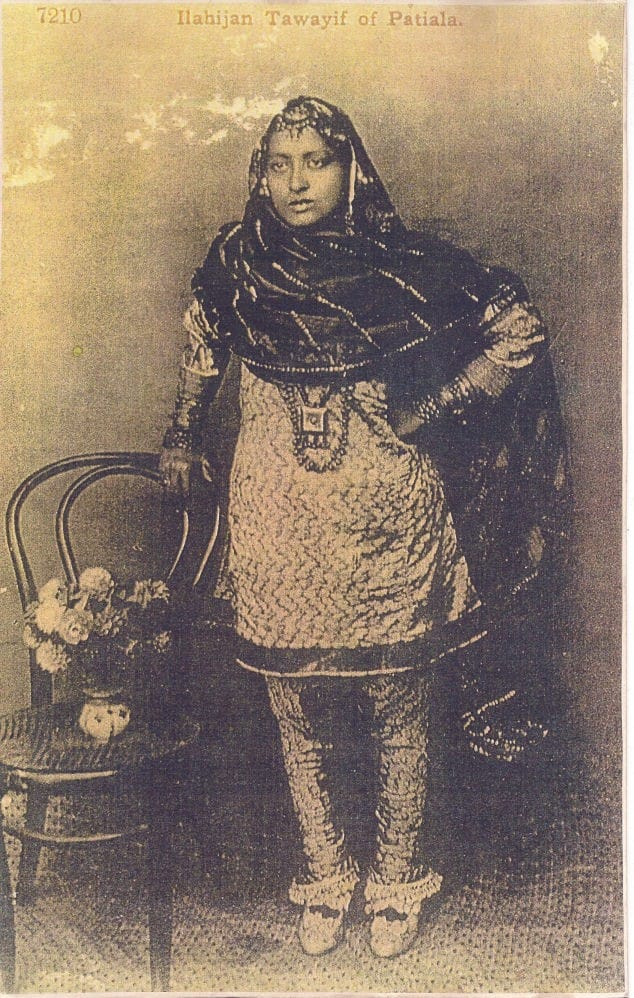
A Patiala Punjabi woman in Phulkari, c. 1900

Various coarse structured fabrics such as khaddar, dasuti, and khaddar casement were used for embroidery work, including phulkari. According to the employment of phulkari types "chaddar," "bagh," or "chope," these khaddar characteristics vary in thickness, weight, and loose or firmly woven structures. The first was a loosely woven khaddar with coarse yarns, which stood in contrast to "Halwan" (a lightweight and finely woven Khaddar), and the third was "Chaunsa Khaddar," which was woven with finer yarns and was chosen for "Bagh".

Phulkari was essentially a product of domestic work done by the women of the household. The fabric on which Phulkari embroidery was done was hand spun khaddar (a handloomed plain-weave cotton fabric). Cotton was grown throughout the Punjab plains, and after a series of simple processes, it was spun into yarn by the women on the charkha (spinning wheel). After making the yarn, it was dyed by the lalari (dyer) and woven by the jullaha (weaver).

Traditionally, use of coarse khaddar fabric made it easy to count the yarn. The base khaddar cloth used in Western Punjab was finer than what was used in Central Punjab. The fabric was woven in widths, which were narrow, as the width of the loom was such. Thus, the fabric had to be stitched lengthwise to make the desired width, which was later embroidered. This practice of stitching two pieces was common among textiles of Punjab in the early 20th century. In West Punjab (now in Pakistan), two or three pieces of cloth were first folded and joined, leading to distorted designs. In East Punjab (now Punjab, Haryana, and part of Himachal Pradesh), they were joined first and then embroidered.

A Phulkari (in the narrow sense) with traditional flower pattern on unworked background, Punjab

A Bagh Phulkari, fully embroidered to cover the base cloth, Punjab

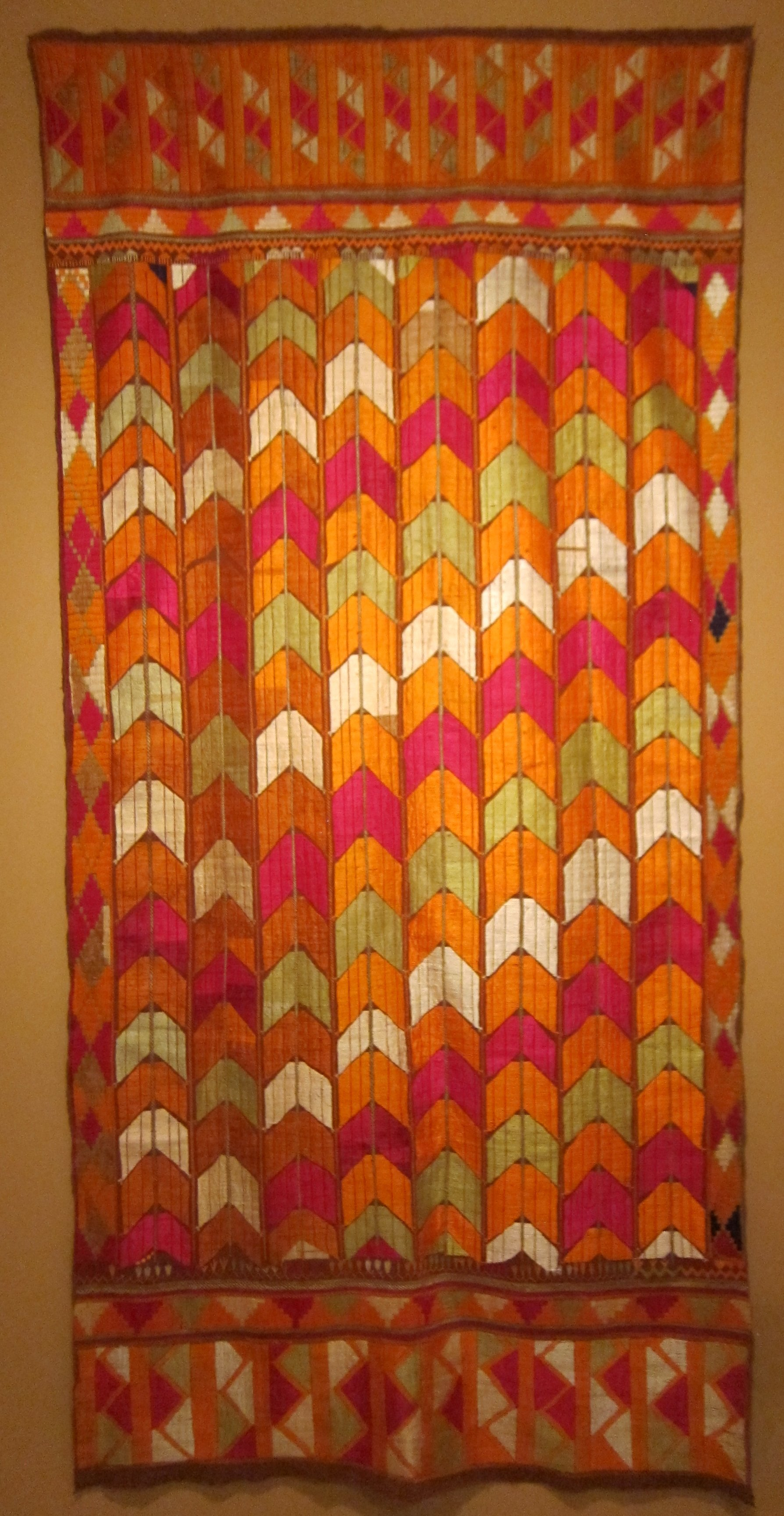
20th-century Khadi Phulkari from Punjab (India), Honolulu Museum of Art

=== Patterns ===
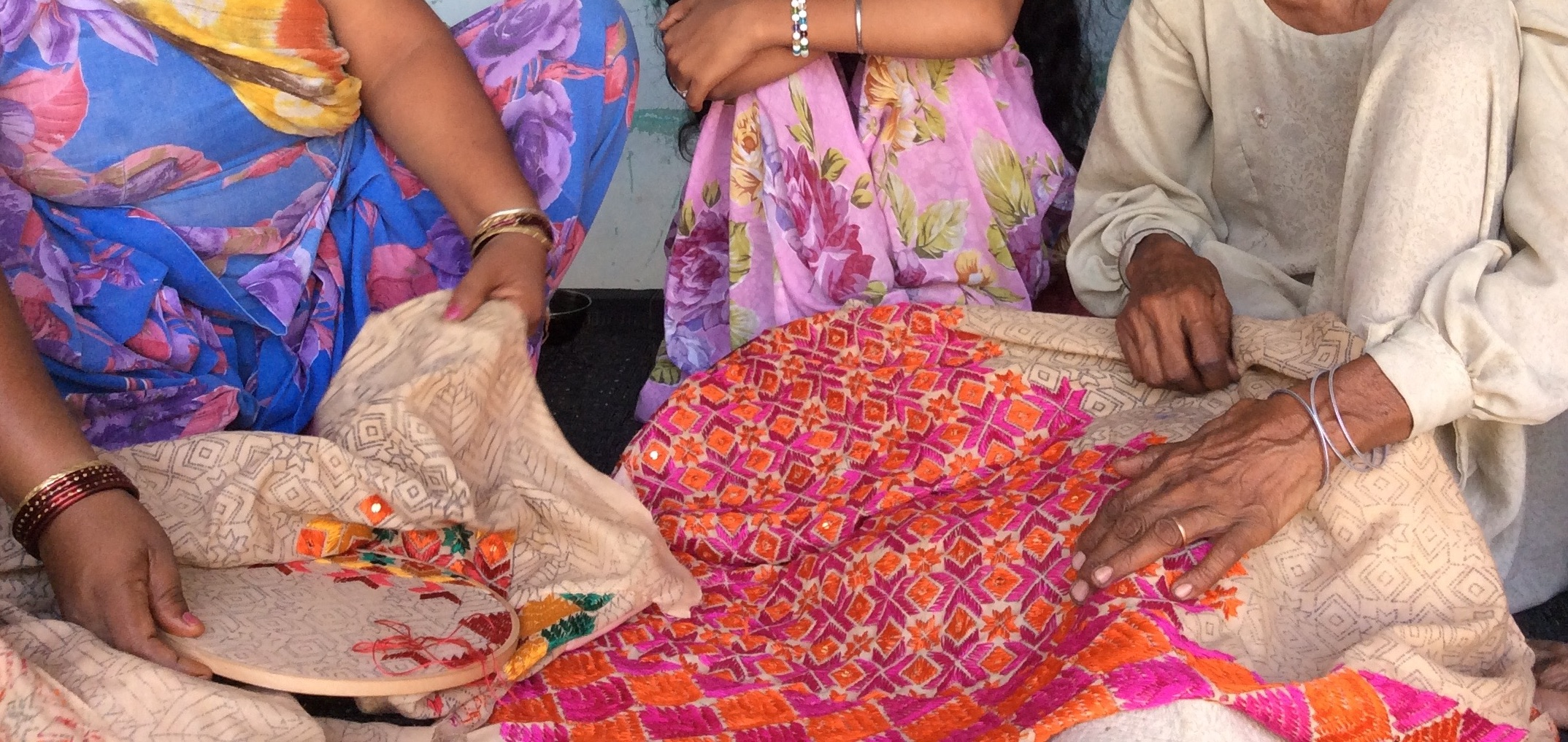
Women artisans embroidering with Patt in Rajpura, Punjab (India), 2015

The hallmark of Phulkari is, making innumerable patterns by using long and short darn stitches. There were no pattern books and embroidery was worked entirely from the reverse of the fabric. The designs were not traced. Techniques and patterns were not documented but transmitted by word of mouth, and each regional group was identified with the style of embroidery or design The embroidery is done with floss silk thread. Soft, untwisted silk floss called patt, was used for embroidery. The thread came from Kashmir, Afghanistan, and Bengal and was dyed in the big cities by the lalaris. The best quality silk came from China. The village ladies obtained the thread from hawkers or peddlers who went from village to village selling daily needed items.

The most favoured colour was red and its shades, because red is considered auspicious by both Hindus and Sikhs of Punjab. Madder brown, rust red, or indigo were the usual background colours for a base for the embroideries. White was used in Bagh by elderly ladies and widows. Black and blue were less preferred in Western Punjab, whereas white was less commonly used in East Punjab. Geometrical patterns are usually embroidered on the Phulkaris. Phulkari depicted scenes from everyday life in the villages. Animals and birds represented success, beauty, pride, and goodwill, and different fruits symbolized wealth, prosperity, and fertility. Wheat and barley stalks with ears were also common motifs. No religious subjects or darbar (Sikh temple hall) scenes were embroidered. The decorated end of a scarf or shawl, the pallu, has separate panels of exquisite Phulkari workmanship with striking designs.

Despite the fact that this embroidery was not originally done on a commercial scale, some of it did find a market abroad in the 19th century. The embroideries for shawls or ghagras (a long, full, decorated skirt) were used to make curtains for European homes. Specimens of phulkari cloth from different regions of Punjab were sent to the Colonial and Indian Exhibition, held under the British regime. By the end of the 19th century, Phulkaris and Baghs had found a market in Europe and America. There were firms in Amritsar where Phulkari work of any shape or size could be ordered. Some of the firms procured orders from Europe for supplying Phulkari on a commercial scale. The newer market dictated the changes in designs and color combinations. Some commented that the Europeanized versions of Phulkari were not Indian at all. The embroideries were in black, green, and red and the stitches of embroidery were an inch in length.

== Types ==
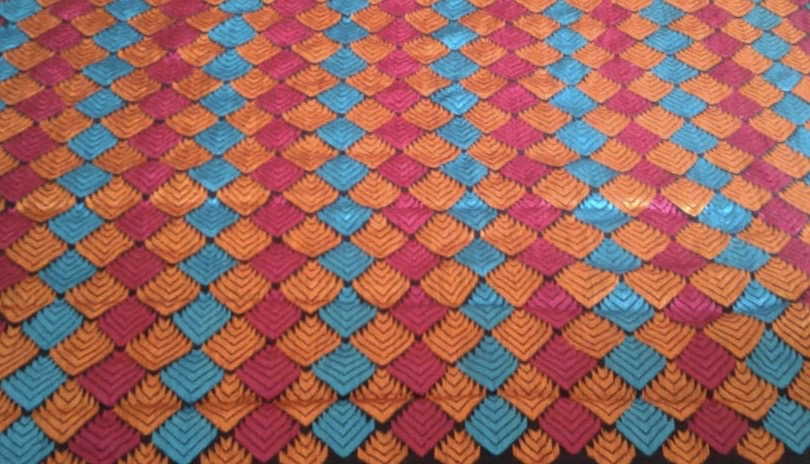
Phulkari Dupatta, created for Kanya Aagman (Arrival of the Bride) at a traditional Punjabi wedding in the US.

Pal (1960) describes the following traditional varieties of Phulkari: bagh ('garden'), chope, subhar, sainchi, tilpatra, neelal, ghungat bagh, and chammas. He also describes the materials used, colours, and stitching techniques. The traditional cloth would be khaddar using hand-spun cotton. The cotton would be weaved professionally to create a heavy material. Lighter versions called halvaan were also used. Pal noted that khaddi material was also becoming popular. The colours were red, white, golden yellow, green, and deep blue. Natural methods would be used to dye the material, such as utilising flowers. A popular method was to use the Rubia cordifolia tree known as Indian madder and Majith in Punjabi. Unspun silk thread known as patt would be used to embroider the designs using the double stitch known in Punjabi as dasuti tropa, herringbone stitch and satin stitch. Long and short stitches would be employed. No stencil would be used to embroider the designs.

Women would gather to embroider phulkaris. Traditional folk songs would be sung by the group. Pal also gives one instance of a woman putting one grain of wheat to one side for every stitch she made. When the phulkari was complete, the lady donated the grains away. Sometimes, different styles can be seen on one phulkari. This is because each girl would use her own imagination to stitch a design, perhaps to remind the girl when she gets married of her friends who helped stitch the phulkari. Thind (2005) mentions another variety: the bawan bagh, where more than one bagh style is used on one cloth. Many of the varieties are part of museum exhibitions and private collections. Thind makes reference to the contributions made by Mohinder Singh Randhawa in promoting the preservation of Phulkari art. He also mentions private collections where he has seen various motifs including the Harmandir Sahib (Golden Temple) embroidered in a Phulkari.

=== Bagh ===
Bagh (meaning 'a garden') is a style where the entire surface is embroidered. By working with darning stitch, numerous designs are made by use of horizontal, vertical, and diagonal stitches.

Specifically, phulkari denotes sparingly-embroidered flowers, whereas a large, intricately embroidered flower pattern that covers the base cloth almost completely is a bagh. Similarly, in contemporary modern designs, simple and sparsely embroidered dupattas (long scarves), odhinis (oversized long scarf), and shawls, made for everyday use, are referred to as phulkaris, whereas clothing items that cover the entire body, made for special and ceremonial occasions such as weddings are called baghs.

There were many kinds of bagh depending on its usage, such as ghungat bagh and vari da bagh. In many cases the designs were inspired by what the embroiderer saw around them. The kitchen provided the designs of many baghs—belan (rolling pin) bagh, mirchi (chilli) bagh, gobhi (cauliflower) bagh, karela (bitter gourd) bagh, and dabbi (metal container) bagh. Others like Dilli Darwaza, Shalimar Char, and Chaurasia Baghs depicted the layout of Mughal gardens. The scattered work on the fabric is called adha bagh (half garden). The work done with white or yellow silk floss on cotton khaddar that starts from the center of the fabric and spreads to the whole fabric is called "Chashm-e-Bulbul".

Historically, the exquisite embroidery for baghs are known to have been made in the districts of Hazara, Peshawar, Sialkot, Jhelum, Rawalpindi, Multan, Amritsar, Jalandhar, Ambala, Ludhiana, Nabha, Jind, Faridkot, Kapurthala and Chakwal of the Punjab region.

Ghunghat bagh

Originating in Rawalpindi, the ghunghat bagh is heavily embroidered around the centre on the edge to be worn over the head. The embroidered centre is then pulled over the face so as to form an embroidered veil.

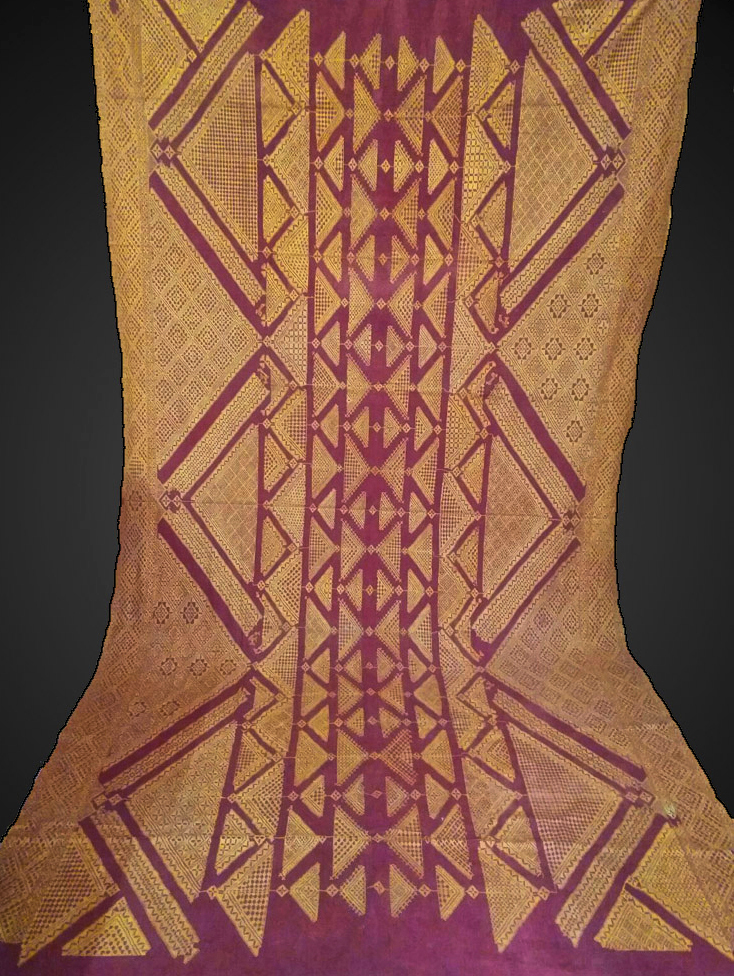
Antique Chope created using Holbein stitch that results in the same visual on the front and the back of the textile. Courtesy: The Wovensouls collection

=== Chope and subhar ===
The two styles of chope and subhar are worn by brides. The chope is embroidered on both sides of the cloth.

Chope traditionally is embroidered on red with yellow. Two fabric panels are joined that have similar patterns embroidered on both ends. The only motifs embroidered on both selvages are a series of triangles with the base towards the selvage and pointing inwards. The design is worked with small squares in a step-ladder fashion. Only the borders and the four edges of the cloth are embroidered in fine embroidery. The subhar has a central motif and four motifs on the corners.

=== Darshan dwar ===
Darshan Dwar is a type of Phulkari which was made as an offering or bhet (presentation). It has panelled architectural design. The pillars and the top of the gate are filled with latticed geometrical patterns. Sometimes human beings are also shown standing at the gate.

=== Sainchi ===
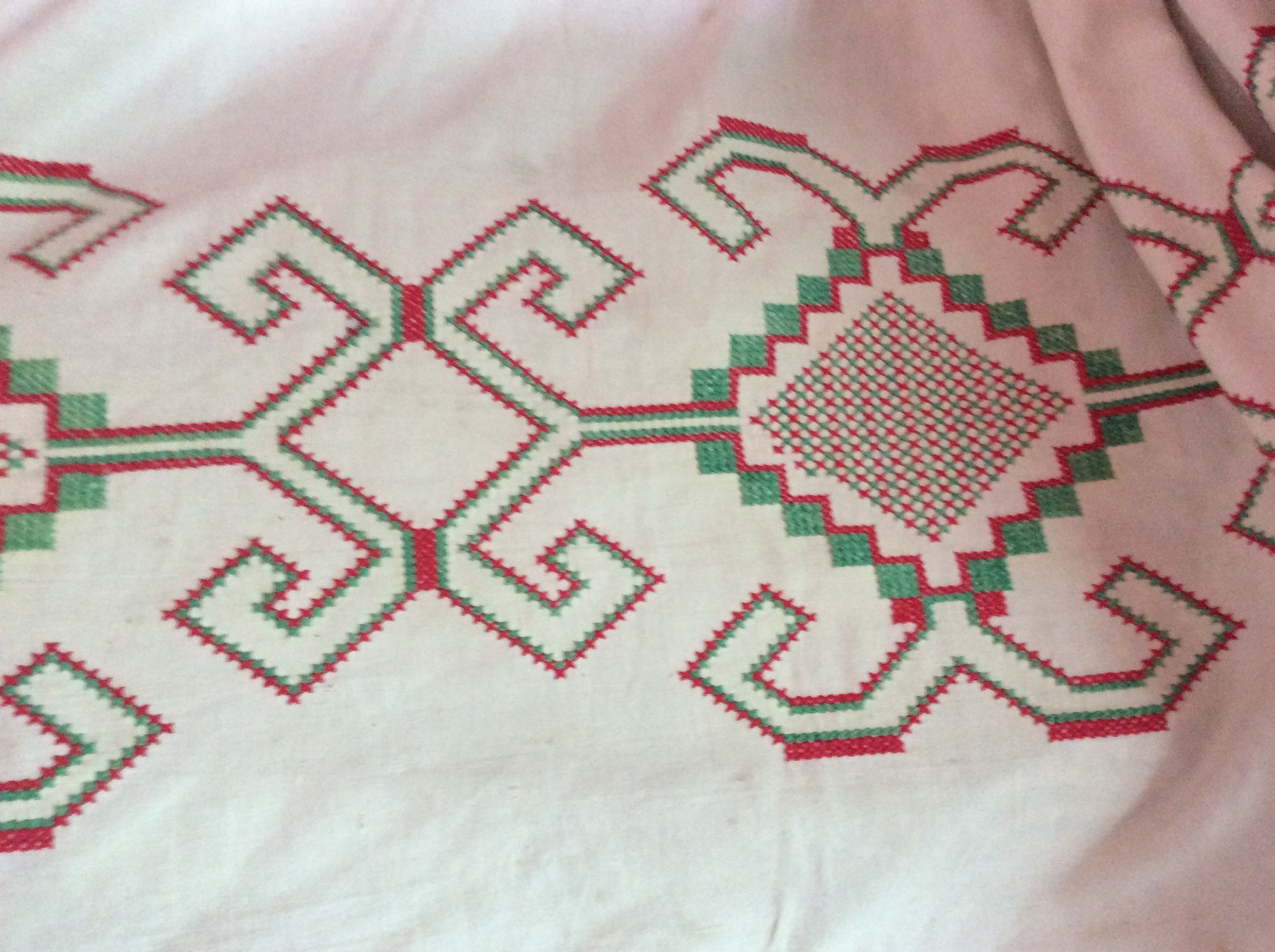
Close-up of a rare contemporary chope made in Rajpura, Punjab (India) in 2015

This is the only style where the outlines of the figures are drawn using black ink. It is then filled by embroidering with darn stitch. In other styles, there are no patterns drawn, and the work was done only by counting the threads from the back. Sainchi was popular in the Bathinda and Faridkot districts. Sainchi phulkari was also popular in and around Ferozepur.

Sainchi embroidery draws inspiration from village life and depicts various scenes of everyday village life such as a man ploughing, lying on a charpai (jute cot), playing chaupar (a cross and circle board game), smoking hookah, or guests drinking sharbat (sweet cordial). Common themes also include women performing chores like churning milk, grinding wheat flour on the chakki (hand mill), and working on the charkha (spinning wheel). Women also embroidered scenes which they found interesting, such as a British official coming to a village or women carrying an umbrella and walking along with memsahib (the wife of a British official). Birds, trains, and circuses, as well as scenes from popular Punjabi legends like Sohni Mahiwal and Sassi-Punnun were often depicted The style also incorporates jewellery designs of bracelets, earrings, rings and necklaces. Pal (1960) believes that such designs did no form part of the traditional method of embroidering Phulkaris but expressed a woman's wish to have such items of jewellery.

=== Tilpatra ===
The term tilpatra (til + patra) means 'the spreading of seeds'. The tilpatra has decorative embroidery which is spread out as if spreading sesame seeds.

=== Neelak ===
Neelak phulkari is made of a black or red background with yellow or bright red embroidery. The color of the phulkari is mixed with metals.

=== Chhamaas ===
The Chhaamas phulkari hail from Rohtak, Gurgaon, Hissar, and Delhi. The Chaamas Phulkari incorporates mirrors which are sewn into the cloth with yellow, grey, or blue thread.

=== Phulkari of the South and Southwestern Punjab region ===
The phulkari of south and southwestern Punjab in India and Pakistan has wide edges upon which designs of animals and birds are embroidered. As is the case of the chope, the edges are embroidered on both sides of the cloth.

== Usage ==
Traditionally, phulkari garments were part of a girl's wedding trousseau. Its motifs were expressive of her emotions and the number of phulkari pieces defined the status of the family.

According to Blurton (2003), "angular satin-stitch baghs (shawls) and phulkaris (shawls similar to baghs, but less heavily embroidered)" up to 20 pieces would form part of a brides dowry. The items would be gifted by the bride's father, uncles and mother-in-law. Blurton further states that it took many years for the baghs and phulkaris to be embroidered. Traditionally women would begin to embroider the bhagh when their grandsons were born to be given to their future brides.

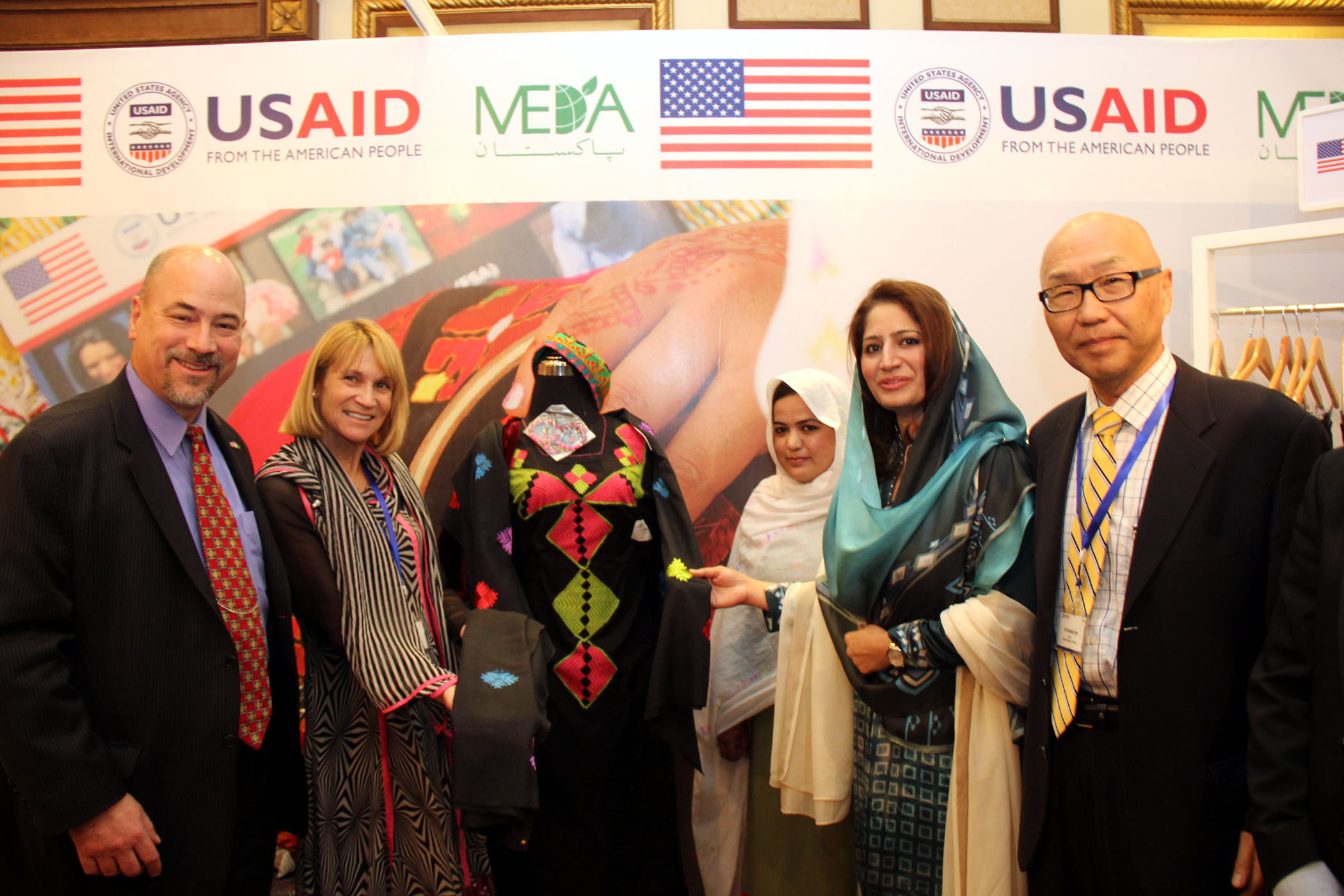
A dress from Sindh embroidery of Phulkari called Gulkari in Sindhi

Accordingly, in the past, as soon as a girl was born, mothers and grandmothers would start embroidering Baghs and Phulkaris, which were to be given away at the time of marriage. Depending on the status of the family, the parents would give a dowry of 11 to 101 Baghs and Phulkaris. It was also passed from one generation to the next as an heirloom.

Phulkaris and bagh were worn by women all over Punjab during marriage festivals and other joyous occasions. They were embroidered by the women for their own use and the use of other family members and were not for sale in the market.

Fifty-two different types of phulkari once existed, but they have been reduced to less than a handful in the 21st century. Women were formerly able to embroider without the use of tracing blocks. Most contemporary embroiderers can no longer do so and use tracing blocks. According to handloom and handicraft traditions expert Jasleen Dhamija, "The embroidery form became more or less extinct. Nobody promoted these." Poor treatment from the Indian fashion industry has also been partially blamed for its decline.

=== Phulkari chowk ===
In the Punjab, temporary art using flour, called chowk poorana, is drawn on the floor for ceremonial or decorative purposes. Sometimes chowk poorana is drawn in Punjabi courtyards using flour and colours. The designs drawn are the motifs embroidered on phulkaris. Green is used for the branches and leaves, and white, red and yellow is used for the flowers. Such chowk is called the phulkari chowk. There are different types of chowk but the starting point is a square made with flour. However, any design can be made within the square such as circles or triangular shapes. Dots are drawn using red sindoor (vermilion).

== Revival and exhibitions ==
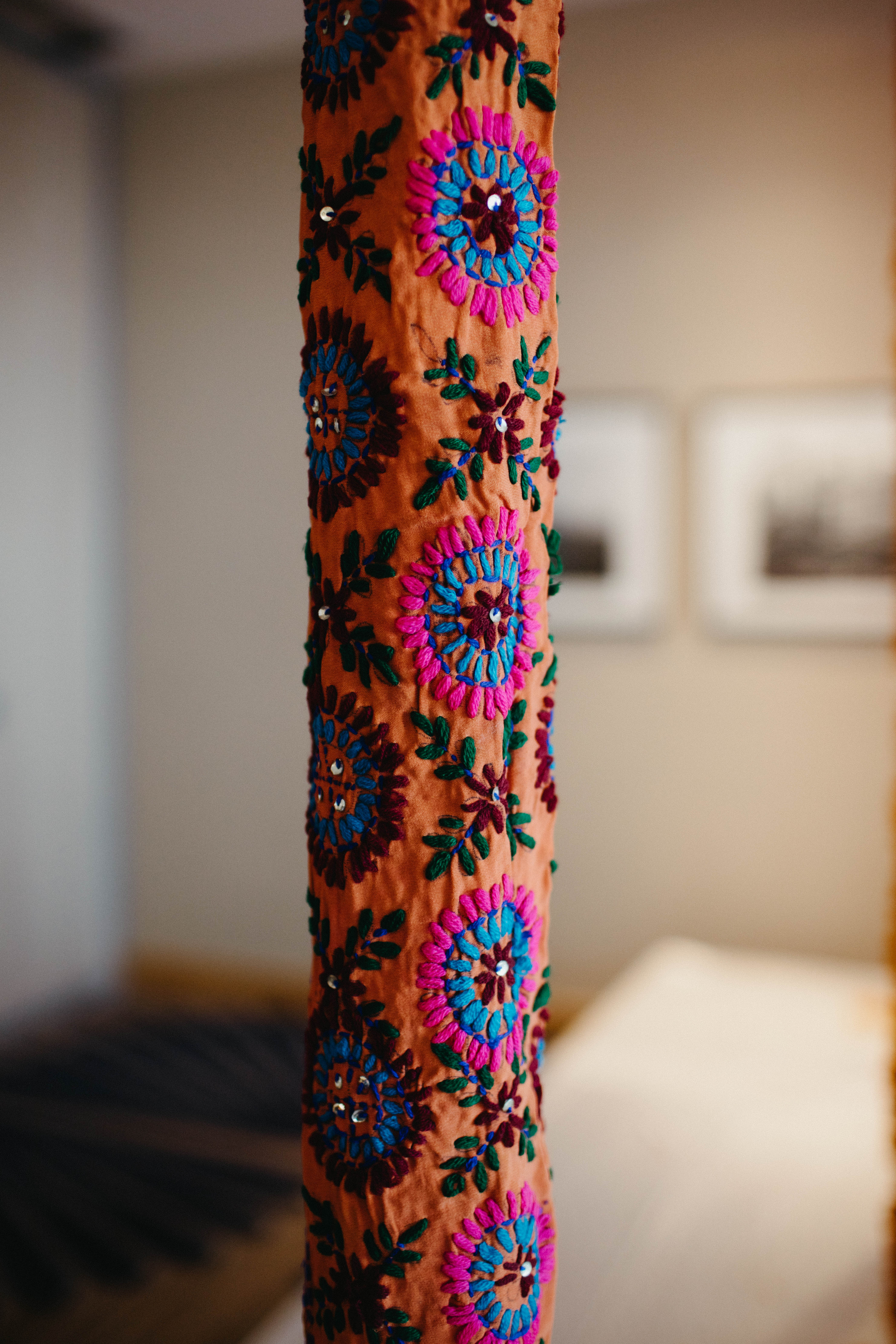
Modern use of Phulkari dupatta for Mandap column decoration at a Punjabi wedding in the US, 2019

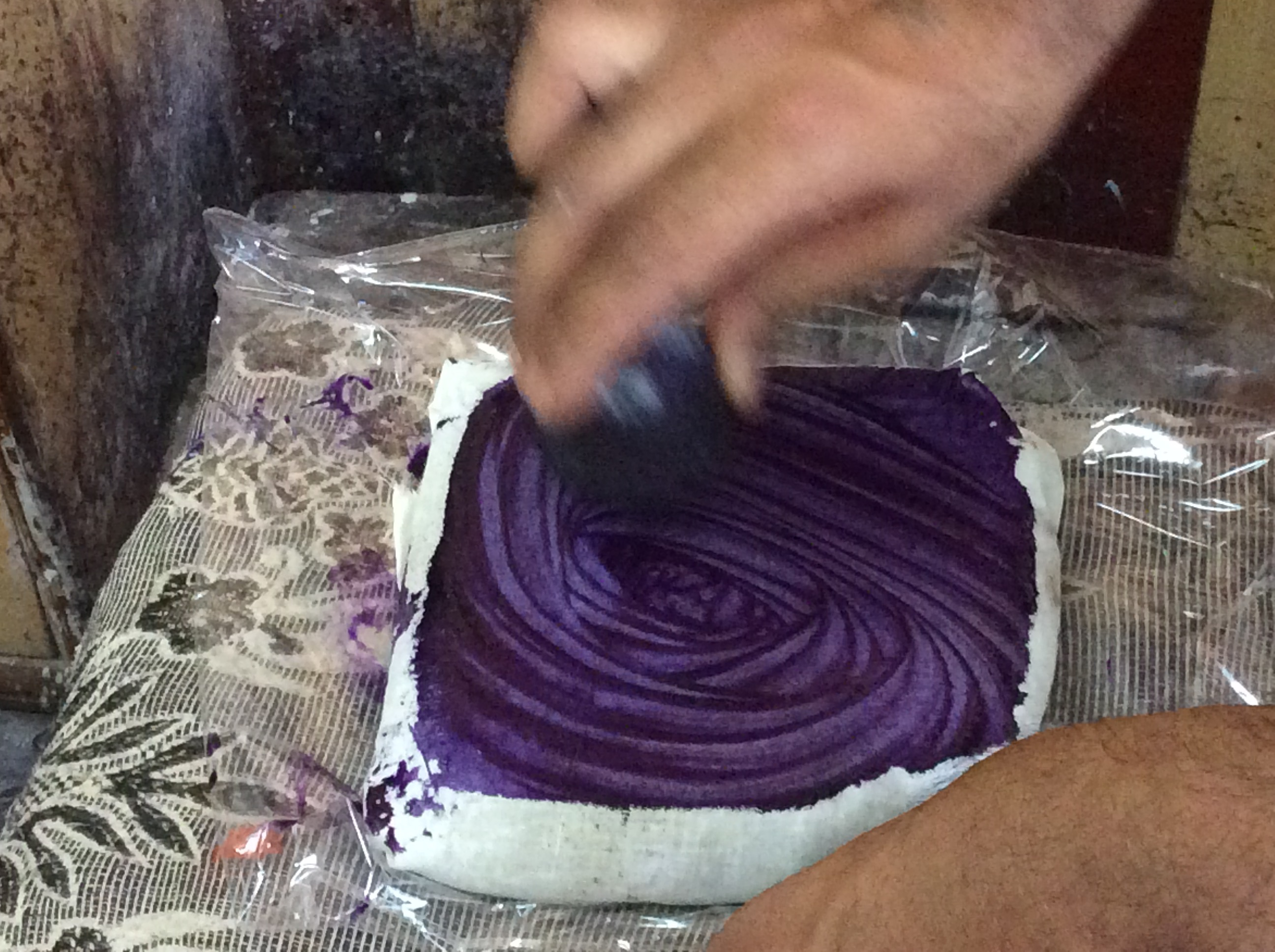
Award-winning Phulkari embroiderer in Patiala, Punjab (India) demonstrates first step of the contemporary embroidery technique, 2015

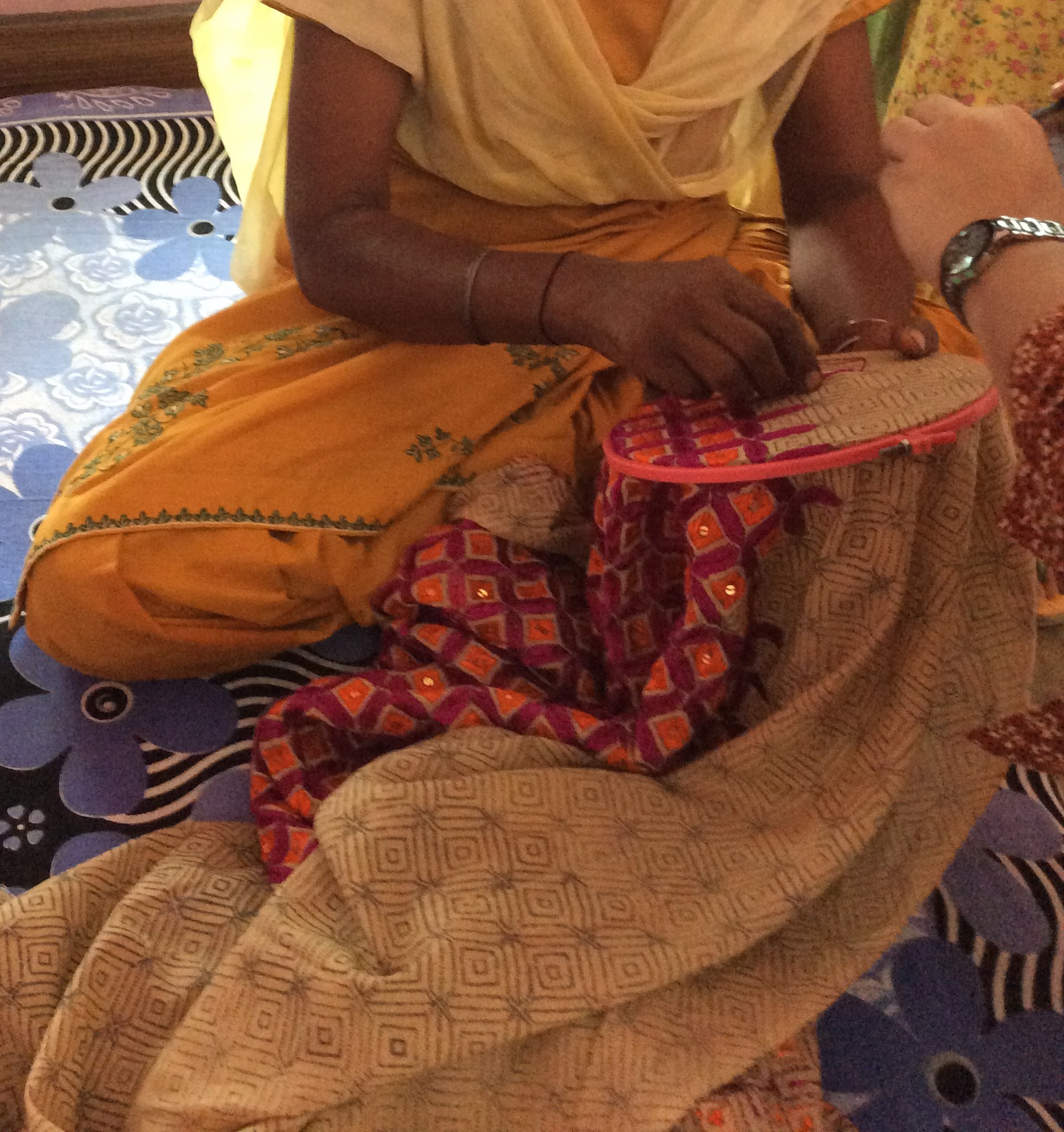
Woman artisan in Rajpura, Punjab (India) embroidering Phulkari using a tracing, 2015

Noting the value of traditional phulkaris, Aryan (1983) collected the garments noting their spectacular artwork. Such efforts to preserve the art of Phulkari has influenced its revival.

Pal (1960) states that, despite there being a reduction in the art for the last 50 years in undivided Punjab, girls and women still continued to embroider phulkaris in the then Punjab comprising modern Punjab, India, Haryana and parts of Himachal Pradesh to at least the 1950s. In villages far away from the cities, Phulkaris such as the chope were still given to brides hailing from traditional families. However, he noted a marked loss of interest in the craft as a whole. Phulkaris could be seen hanging on walls using nails, being placed on the ground when religious figures attended villages, being used in the fields to collect crops and being used as rags. Phulkaris were being sold at cheap rates to collectors from overseas who would then sell them at higher rates. Women would give away lighter Phulkaris to servants. Pal believed that the Punjab is a progressive state of India but it did not value its traditional crafts. Renewed interest has only resulted from the refugee crisis after the 1947 partition whereby organisations encouraged women to embroider Phulkaris to make ends meet. Thind (2005) believes that it is Pal's chapter that triggered a serious interest in preserving the dying tradition of Phulkari. People began to take note of the folk art. Thind also noted private collectors preserving traditional Phulkaris. In his visit to the U.K. in 1980, Thind saw a private collection of Phulkaris with various motifs. He also mentions work by local organisations in Punjab (India). Various books have also been written on the subject either wholly dedicated to the subject or in chapters. The renewed interest can be seen in girls and women wearing Phulkari scarfs and carrying Phulkari bags. However, the new method of embroidering Phulkaris is distinct from the traditional method. Phulkaris are now embroidered using machines and modern materials.

In 2011, after a five-year-long legal case, Phulkari was awarded the geographical indication (GI) status in India, which means that after that only registered traders and manufacturers, from the states of Punjab, Haryana, and Rajasthan would be able to use the term for the traditional craft, and the patent information centre (PIC) of Punjab State Council for Science and Technology would issue a logo or hologram to distinguish the product.

Over the years, the Indian and Punjab governments have been working towards promotion of phulkari embroidery, by organizing special training programs, fairs, and exhibitions. Since most of the women artisans creating phulkari are in the unorganized sector or work through middlemen, they do not make much money compared to an actual selling price of their product. To overcome this, Punjab Small Industries and Export Corporation (PSIEC) formed women self-help groups and cooperatives to sell directly and make more profits. Their products retail at PHULKARI- Punjab Government Emporiums in New Delhi, Chandigarh, Patiala, Kolktata, and Amritsar. The Patiala Handicraft Workshop Cooperative Industrial Society Ltd. (Society for Rural Women Empowerment) founded a Phulkari cluster in 1997. 880 Phulkari artisans are now part of the cluster and over 10,000 women have been trained in Phulkari embroidery.

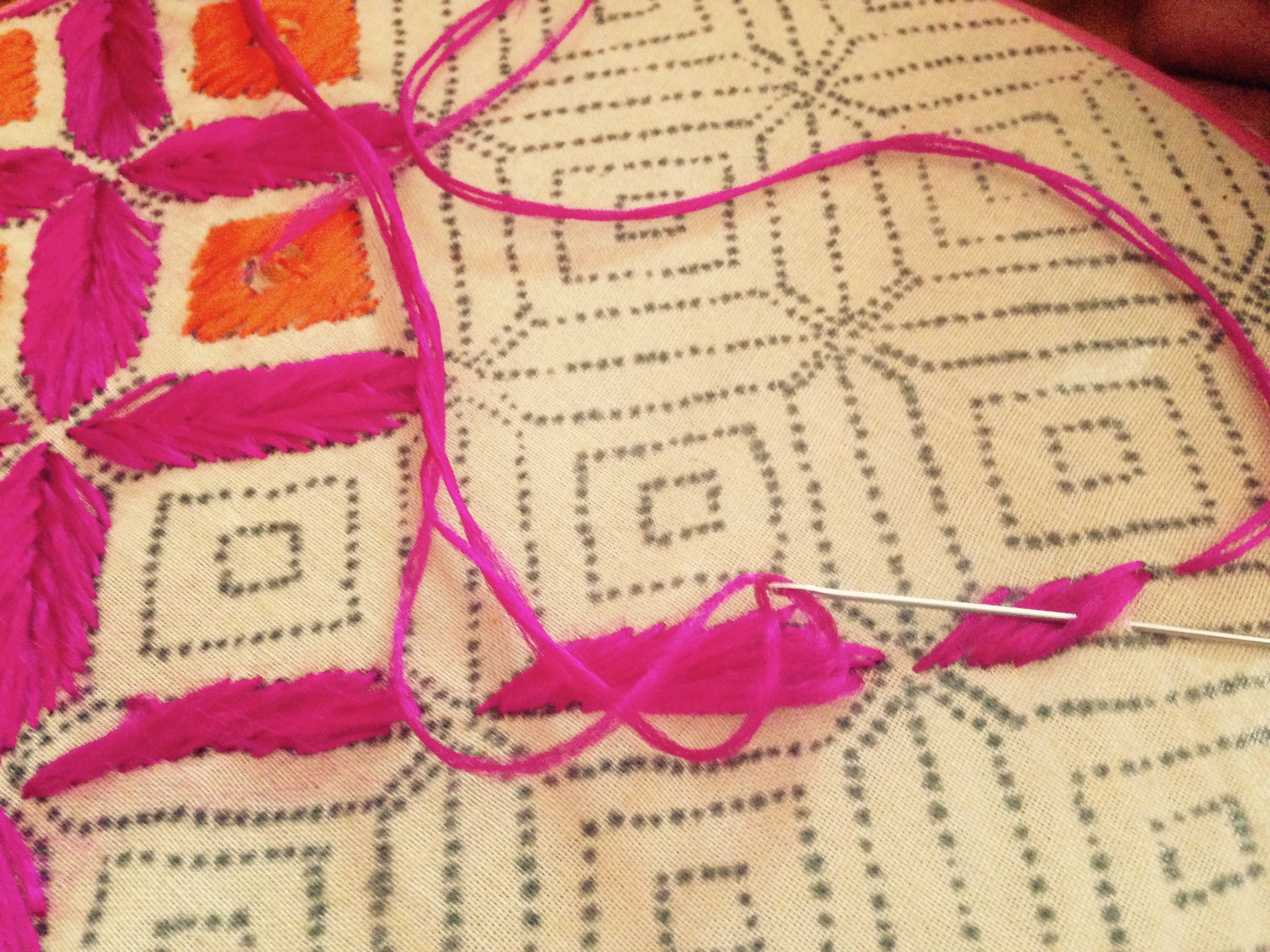
Close-up of tracing on cloth - a contemporary Phulkari embroidery technique by female artisan in Rajpura, Punjab (India), 2015

There are several non-profits in Punjab that promote Phulkari to empower women by providing a source of livelihood. The Nabha Foundation launched the Phulkari Traditional Craft Program in 2007 to "empower the marginalized rural woman, generate sustainable home based employment." The Phulkari Makers of Bassi Pathana is a financially independent self-group which evolved from the vocational training initiatives at Mehar Baba Charitable Trust in 2009. Artisan markets like Dilli Haat in New Delhi feature stalls by India several National Award winners like Mrs. Lajwanti Devi from Patiala who was awarded the Rashtrapati Award in 1995 for her embroidery. Phulkari products can also be found at occasional bazaars at Dastkar, at Diwali melas, at the Lota Shop at the National Crafts Museum in New Delhi, the Punjab Handloom Emporium in Ludhiana, and in some private chains like 1469. Garg (2017) in her study of the prevalence of the Phulkari craft in Punjab (India) notes that there are various units set up in Patiala district where mainly women reported that they have been carrying on the work set up by their mothers and grandmothers. The respondents also stated that Phulkari work was particularly carried out after the arrival of refugees in Patiala after 1947 from West Punjab.

Some modern fashion designers are incorporating this embroidery into their designs, and its use has spread beyond traditional salwar kameez and dupatta to accessories like jackets, handbags, cushion covers, table-mats, shoes, slipper, juttis, and children's clothes. Phulkaris are now sold online on popular retail and fashion websites and apps and can be found in the homes of Punjabis as well as Indian handloom aficionados. Kaur and Gupta (2016) state that the traditional khaddar material has now been replaced by fine materials such as chiffon and silk for the base. The traditional Pat thread has been replaced by synthetic silk thread. All types of dark and light colours are used. This revival can be used to design the interiors of buildings such as Phulkari style curtains or Phulkari work on lamps to enhance the use of Phulkari.

In Pakistan, Madan and Phul (2016) noted that the Phulkari work of the Punjab was revived in Hazara (of undivided Punjab but now in Khyber Pakhtunkhwa) on the initiative of an NGO. Although this revival has helped poor rural families, the Phulkaris produced on a commercial level are not of the same quality as the traditional craft.

A major challenge to hand-embroidered Phulkaris today is the growth of relatively inexpensive machine-made Phulkaris from in Amritsar and Ludhiana. As there is further innovation in machine embroidery, machine-made Phulkaris on synthetic fabrics are starting to appear alongside traditional hand-embroidered Phulkaris in artisanal markets. In addition, traditional Phulkari embroidery is a painstaking and time-consuming art that strains the eyes, and, as many women work indoors with poor lighting, it leads to the deterioration of their eyesight over time. Relatively low wages have made it economically inviable for many young women as a means of livelihood.

There are limited books on Phulkari available online or in bookstores for purchase. The library at Punjabi University, Patiala has extensive reading material on Phulkaris. Indira Gandhi National Centre for the Arts (IGNCA) acquired a collection of selected phulkari for its archives in 1994. The Textile Gallery at the National Crafts Museum has a very extensive collection of Phulkaris. The Philadelphia Museum of Art has a permanent exhibition featuring Phulkaris from the museum's Jill and Sheldon Bonovitz Collection and contemporary designs by Bollywood celebrity designer Manish Malhotra.

== See also ==
- Embroidery of India
- Trinjan
