= Bagh Union Council, Azad Kashmir =

Bagh is a Union Council of Bagh District in Azad Kashmir.

In the 2005 Kashmir earthquake deaths and injuries were recorded in Bagh - out of a total population of 51,224 the Pakistani army survery reported 1931 reported deaths (representing 3.8% of the population) and 3,047 injuries (5.9%).
