= Gachin Rural District =

Rural district in Hormozgan province, Iran

Gachin Rural District Persian: دهستان گچين
- Rural District
- Location within Iran
- Coordinates: 27°06′14″N 55°56′54″E
- Country: Iran
- Province: Hormozgan
- County: Bandar Abbas
- District: Central
- Capital: Gachin-e Bala

Population (2016)
  - Total: 18,960
- Time zone: UTC+3:30 (IRST)

Gachin Rural District (Persian: دهستان گچين) is in the Central District of Bandar Abbas County, Hormozgan province, Iran. Its capital is the village of Gachin-e Bala.

== Demographics ==
=== Population ===
At the time of the 2006 National Census, the rural district's population was 19,479 in 4,343 households. There were 20,741 inhabitants in 5,379 households at the following census of 2011. The 2016 census measured the population of the rural district as 18,960 in 4,832 households. The most populous of its 26 villages was Gachin-e Bala, with 3,936 people.
