= List of cities, towns and villages in Hormozgan province =

A list of cities, towns and villages in Hormozgan Province of southern Iran:

== Alphabetical ==
Cities are in bold text; all others are villages.

=== A ===
Ab Bid-e Kusha | Ab Damil | Ab Garman | Ab Garm-e Khurgu | Ab Gazan | Ab Golman | Ab Kahur | Ab Pish | Ab Qalamun | Ab Shirin | Ab Tarikan-e Pain | Ab Zaminu | Abad | Abbasabad | Abd | Abdollahabad | Ab-e Mosla | Abgaman | Abgarm-e Lay Bisheh | Abkuhi | Abmah | Abshur | Abshurak | Abu Musa | Abzaluiyeh | Aghasin-e Bala | Aghasin-e Pain | Aghushk Khoshk Kari | Aghushkash | Aghushkdal | Agi Band Bast | Aha Khani | Ahmadabad | Ahmadabad | Ahmadabad | Ahmadabad | Ahmadabad | Ahmadabad-e Koleybi | Ahmadi | Ahsham Khosrow Khan | Ahun | Akbari | Akharan | Al Mahdi Aluminum Complex | Alai | Al-e Darvish | Al-e Mahmudi | Ali Ahmadan | Ali Qandi | Aliabad | Aliabad | Aliabad | Aliabad | Aliabad | Aliabad | Aliabad-e Sarhadi | Amani | Amirabad | Anarshirin | Anbarak | Anguran | Anjirak | Anjirdan | Anjireh | Anveh | Arabi | Arangu-ye Bala | Arangu-ye Pain | Arengan | Armak | Armaki | Arreh Kan | Asheqan | Ashkan | Asiab | Asu | Avin-e Olya | Avin-e Sofla | Ayeshehabad | Azizabad

=== B ===
Babak | Badafshan-e Pain | Bagh Golan | Bagh Golan | Bagh Jafar | Bagh Narges | Bagh Shah | Baghak | Baghan | Baghan | Baghat | Baghdadi | Bagh-e Bala | Bagh-e Chenar | Baghestan | Baghestan | Baghu | Baghuni | Baghuyeh | Bagud | Bahal | Baharkan | Bahmadi | Bahmani | Bahmani | Bajani | Bajari | Bajk | Baluli | Bambari | Bamestan | Ban Bast | Ban Gowd-e Ahmadi | Band Bast | Bandak | Bandar Abbas | Bandar Abbas Industrial Estate | Bandar Charak | Bandar Khamir | Bandar Lengeh | Bandar-e Band-e Moallem | Bandar-e Bostanu | Bandar-e Chiruiyeh | Bandar-e Gasheh | Bandar-e Lengeh Airport | Bandar-e Micha-il | Bandar-e Mollu | Bandar-e Moqam | Bandar-e Nakhilu | Bandar-e Shenas | Bandar-e Shiu | Bandar-e Tarj | Bandar-e Tauneh | Band-e Barak | Band-e Heydar Abbas | Band-e Korman | Band-e Kuh | Band-e Nowruz | Band-e Zarak | Ban-e Zirak | Baneh Dan | Bangali | Bangelayan | Bannar | Banu | Banuband | Banuband-e Pasang | Banuband-e Patil | Banzir | Baqiabad | Bar Aftab | Bar Ahang | Bar Derazy | Bar Rud | Bar | Barani | Barasht-e Bala | Barast | Barchah | Bardeghun | Bareqin Khunsorkh | Bareshkan | Barezard | Barghani-ye Bala | Baridi | Barisimu | Bariz | Barrud | Bartarak | Bartomb | Basaidu | Bash Kardan | Bashtin | Basreh | Bast Qalat | Bastak | Bast-e Bikh | Basteh | Bastu | Baverd | Baverdan | Baviyeh | Baynuj | Bazgard | Baziari | Beh Deh | Behtish | Bejgui | Bemani | Benambani | Beneh Kan | Benhesar | Berag | Berbar | Berentin | Berenzaki | Berkeh Doka | Berkeh Lari | Berkeh-ye Khalaf | Berkeh-ye Soflin | Berkeh-ye Soltan | Beshnow | Bey Kahnu | Beynak-e Olya | Bi Majan | Biahi | Bidan | Biduiyeh-ye Kajin | Biglarabad | Bika | Bikh | Bimbaki | Bing | Biseh | Biskau | Biverch | Bohregh | Bohregh-e Bala | Bokhvan | Bolandu | Bolbolabad | Bolboli | Bolkheyri | Bon Gahar | Bonab | Bonashk | Bondar | Bondar | Bondaran | Bon-e Garekh | Boneh Kuh | Bonkaram | Bonushi | Borhan | Borkohnak | Bostaneh | Bostanu | Bostegan | Broadcasting Transmitters | Bu Jebrail | Bu ol Askar | Buchir | Buikan | Bujerash | Bunji-ye Karbasi | Bunji-ye Maski | Bunji-ye Saheli Latidan | Bunuk

=== C ===
Chah Ali-ye Gharbi | Chah Ali-ye Sharqi | Chah Anjir-e Golowrubat | Chah Benard | Chah Deraz | Chah Deraz | Chah Dozdan | Chah Esmail | Chah Faleh-ye Gharbi | Chah Faleh-ye Sharqi | Chah Gaz | Chah Gharbal | Chah Goda | Chah Gowd-e Chamardan | Chah Heydar | Chah Kar | Chah Kharg | Chah Kharu | Chah Mahku | Chah Mir | Chah Morgh | Chah Mosallam | Chah Nuri | Chah Pas | Chah Qil | Chah Sahari | Chah Seyfollah | Chah Sharif | Chah Shirin | Chah Sorkh | Chah Tal-e Shomareh-ye Seh | Chah Tar | Chahanan | Chahchekor | Chahdigi | Chah-e Abd ol Rahman | Chah-e Ahmad | Chah-e Bagh | Chah-e Boneh | Chah-e Darvish | Chah-e Ebrahim | Chah-e Golni | Chah-e Hasan Kahuri | Chah-e Kol | Chah-e Limu | Chah-e Makhur | Chah-e Mirza Khani | Chah-e Neshini | Chah-e Qolmi | Chah-e Sarmeh | Chah-e Shanbeh | Chah-e Suri | Chah-e Zagh | Chahestan | Chahkhodru | Chahkohneh | Chahlak | Chahru | Chahshur-e Halvayi-ye Yek | Chahu Genow-e Bala | Chahu Genow-e Pain | Chahu Golzar | Chahu | Chahu | Chahu-ye Gharbi | Chahu-ye Sharqi | Chakarteh | Chakeri | Chaleh Murt | Chaleh | Chalehelyas | Chaleh-ye Faramarzan | Chalghan | Chalow Gohreh | Chalow-ye Gavmishi | Champah | Chang | Charidaf | Charmian | Charubuni | Chasbaz-e Kusha | Chehvaz | Chek Chek-e Shomali | Chekchek | Chenali | Chenali-ye Bala | Cheraghabad | Cheraghabad-e Bala | Cheraghabad-e Jonubi | Cheraghabad-e Markazi | Cherak-e Bala | Cherak-e Pain | Chi Darki | Chiklu | Chil Gongan | Chil Naban | Chiromabad | Choragh-e Suz | Chuj | Churi | College of Agriculture

=== D ===
Dadi | Dahandar | Dahandar-e Kalak | Dahandar-e Mir Amr | Dahandar-e Shonbeh | Dahan-e Dar | Dahaneh-ye Meymand | Dahaneh-ye Sohrab | Dahaneh-ye Tavarkan | Dahich | Dalalun | Dalvaban-e Olya | Dam Gerow Band | Dam Hara | Dam Tala | Dam Tang-e Masri | Damaghrig | Dametir-e Jonubi | Dametir-e Shomali | Danuki | Daq Finu | Dar Agah | Dar Gol | Dar Gur | Dar Kolahu | Dar Kuh | Dar Nageg | Dar Pahn | Dar Tujan | Darang Madu | Darbagh | Darban-e Salah | Darbast | Darbast | Dardunganj | Dar-e Maku | Dargah | Dargahan | Dargaz | Dargaz | Dargaz-e Palaki | Dargelu | Dargir | Dargiran | Darguen | Darivar | Darjadun | Darjak | Darjak | Darkhaneh | Darkhiaran | Darmar | Darreh Hajji | Darreh-ye Murt | Darshahr | Darshahr-e Gafr | Darva Khani | Darzhgi | Dasht Azadgan | Dasht Jeyhun | Dasht-e Ashkara | Dasht-e Emam | Dasht-e Kenar | Dasht-e Marom | Dasht-e Sefa | Dasht-e Zagh-e Abdan | Dashti | Dashtuiyeh | Dask | Daski | Dast Murdan | Dastgerd-e Dargaz | Dastgerd-e Nagerd | Datow Naseri | Davari-ye Bala | Davari-ye Pain | Daviri | Davudi | Dayrestan | Dazekan | Deh Gel Kan | Deh Gin | Deh Kar | Deh Matun | Deh Moghan | Deh Now | Deh Now | Deh Now-e Khvajeh | Deh Now-e Maragh | Deh Now-e Qalandaran | Deh Now-e Sarab | Deh Nowmir | Deh Pirangan-e Bala | Deh Tall | Deh Tang | Deh Tuk | Dehang | Deh-e Vosta | Deh-e Yari | Deh-e Ziaratan | Dehendar-e Shahbabak | Dehestan-e Bala | Dehestan-e Pain | Dehkhoda | Dehliyan | Dehnow | Dehnow | Dehnow-e Bala | Dehnow-e Pain | Dehu | Delbudani | Demilu | Demshar-e Khurgu | Deralavi | Derikha | Devin | Dezhgan | Di Khur | Dinabad | Dival | Divan | Divdan | Dizu | Do Ab | Do Gerdan Khunsorkh | Do Gonvir | Do Jamilan | Do Kuh | Do Mergh | Dofari | Dom Shahr | Dowdar | Dowkal Pahan | Dozak | Dudu | Dulab | Dur Mish | Durbeni | Dustku

=== E ===
Ebrahim Ali | Emamabad | Emamabad | Emigi | Esfand | Eshkaft-e Siah | Eskaleh-ye Shahid Rajai | Eslamabad | Eslamabad | Eslamabad | Eslamabad | Eslamabad | Eslamabad | Espangun | Espatil | Eyrgun | Ezzatabad

=== F ===
Fakhrabad | Fakhrabad | Farahak | Fareghan | Farsi | Faryab | Faryab | Faryab | Faryab-e Isin | Faryab-e Sanguyeh | Fath ol Jalil | Fatuyeh | Feyzabad | Fin | Fumestan | Fur Khorj

=== G ===
Gabad | Gabrani | Gachin-e Bala | Gachin-e Pain | Gachineh-ye Bala | Gachineh-ye Pain | Gachu | Gachuyeh | Gaharkuh | Gahkom | Gahru | Gajg-e Poshtkuh | Galehgah | Galleh-ye Ashotori | Gandar-e Pain | Gandomi | Ganj | Ganjak | Ganjak | Gapsar | Gar Ab | Garaik | Garaman | Garandu | Garandu | Garani | Garband | Gardaneh-ye Poshtkuh | Garestaneh | Garganji | Gari Guri | Gari Sheykh | Garind | Garisheh | Garmeshak | Garsohru | Garsur | Garu | Garuk | Garuk-e Bala | Garuk-e Pain | Gash | Gashiraz | Gashmi | Gashnuiyeh-ye Bala | Gashnuiyeh-ye Pain | Gashun | Gasman | Gattan-e Olya | Gattan-e Sofla | Gauberi | Gav Bandi | Gav Mordeh | Gavajag | Gavan-e Pain | Gavkosh | Gavmiri | Gavog | Gaz Azar | Gaz Pir | Gaz | Gazan Bazin | Gazan Lagaz | Gazdan | Gazdan | Gazi | Gazriz | Gedu-ye Pain | Genai | Genan | Genow | Geran | Gerdava | Gerd-e Siah | Gerd-e Siah | Gerdekan-e Ahmadi | Gerdu | Gereh Kuh | Gereshmu | Geru Siah | Geru | Gerzeh | Getti | Gevarzin | Gevin | Gevin | Geygan | Gezeh | Gezir | Ghadir Kuhi | Ghadir Saberi | Gheverzeh | Gheybi | Giahdan | Gimach | Gis | Gishab | Gishan | Gishan-e Gharbi | Gishi | Gishnu | Gishu | Gizanag | Godar Gardyal | Godar Shah | Godar-e Arbu | Gohreh | Gohur | Gol Malek | Golestan | Golongu | Golparak | Golruiyeh | Golshan | Golshavar | Golzar | Gombaran | Gonari | Gonbad-e Sorkh | Gonbad-e Sorkh | Gorazabad | Gorazuiyeh | Gorbah Dan | Gordah | Gotav | Govah Kuh | Gowd Kaz | Gowd-e Konardan | Gowdu | Gowdu | Gowhert | Gownamordi | Guchi | Gudi | Guharan | Guner | Guran | Gurandan | Gurband | Gurbuja | Gurevi | Guri | Gurichi | Gurmunow | Gursar | Gurzang | Gushki | Guwdah

=== H ===
Haft Rangu | Hajji Khademi | Hajjiabad | Hajjiabad | Hajjiabad | Hajjiabad | Hajjiabad | Hajjiabad-e Sarhadi | Hakami | Halavan | Halvai-ye Do | Halvai-ye Seh | Hameyran | Hamhang | Hamin | Hamiri | Hamzang | Hanadan | Hanai Sarrigan | Handeh-ye Rabi | Hangar | Hangestan | Harang | Harangan | Harsin | Hasan Langi-ye Bala | Hasan Langi-ye Pain | Hasanabad | Hasanabad | Hasanabad | Hasham Balm | Hasham Kuh | Hasham-e Champeh | Hasham-e Howdow | Hashemabad | Hasht Bandi | Hasht Bandi-ye Do | Hasteh Kuh | Havaran | Hengam-e Jadid | Hengam-e Qadim | Henguiyeh | Henj | Hera | Hesar | Heshniz | Heyatabad | Heydarabad | Heydari | Heyman | Hezarta | Hiru | Hirvand | Hizbandegan | Hojjatabad | Hojjatabad | Hojjatabad-e Kharaji | Holor | Homag-e Bala | Homag-e Pain | Homeyran | Hormozgan Steel Company | Hormozgan Water Treatment Complex | Hormuz | Hoseyn Pump Complex | Hoseynabad | Hoseynabad | Hoseynabad | Hoseynabad | Hoseynabad-e Shageman | Hoseyniyeh | Hun | Hurmudar | Hurmudar-e Bala | Hurmudar-e Pain | Hushdan

=== I ===
Ilchi-ye Bala | Ilud | Irar | Irmish

=== J ===
Jabri | Jaer | Jafarabad | Jafarabad | Jafarabad | Jaghan | Jaghan | Jaghdar-e Bala | Jaghdar-e Pain | Jaghin | Jagin-e Bala | Jagi-ye Sarhadi | Jahelu | Jahla | Jakdan | Jalabi | Jalalabad | Jalali | Jamal Ahmad | Jan Gan | Jan Veri | Jangal Tir Ahmad | Jangal | Jannatabad | Jarit | Jask | Jask-e Kohneh | Javangan | Javoni | Jayin | Jazrabad | Jehad | Jekhish | Jenah | Jeyhun | Jifiri | Jijian | Johl Darak | Jom Anbeh | Jomehi | Jowzan | Jumit | Jushki | Jut | Juzir

=== K ===
Kabeli | Kachek | Kachusk | Kadukar | Kafarghan | Kafchal | Kahan Godar | Kaheh | Kahnan-e Sarney | Kahn-e Bala | Kahnshuiyeh | Kahnu Shotori | Kahnuj | Kahnuj | Kahnuj-e Bozorg | Kahtek | Kahtek | Kahtuiyeh | Kahur Ryis Abbas | Kahurani | Kahurdan | Kahurtak | Kaki | Kal Matali | Kalahu | Kalahu | Kalangi | Kalari | Kalat | Kalatak Sar | Kalatak | Kalatak | Kalat-e Mahmak | Kalatu | Kalatu | Kalatu | Kalavi | Kal-e Alivan | Kal-e Zorat | Kalentan | Kalgharabad | Kalirak | Kalitu | Kalmui | Kalu | Kalukai | Kalut | Kam Guran | Kam Jamal | Kam Kart | Kam Kordan | Kamarzavan | Kambu | Kamdark | Kamsi Savar | Kanakh | Kandal | Kangan | Kani | Kar Gazi | Karatan | Karbala | Kardar | Kardar | Karevan | Kargan | Kargi | Karguh | Kari Dazan | Kari Dazan-e Pain | Karian | Karimabad | Kariza | Karpan | Kart Zani | Karti | Karuch | Karuiyeh | Karun | Kash Qalman-e Bala | Kash Qalman-e Pain | Kash Rudkhaneh | Kashan | Kash-e Takht | Kashi | Kashku | Kashkuiyeh | Kashmir | Kashpiri | Kashuni | Kasisehi | Katuheng | Kelituiyeh | Kemeshk | Kenui | Kermaran | Kermestan | Kerzeh | Keseh | Keshaharan | Keshar-e Bala | Keshar-e Chemerdan | Keshar-e Dustani | Keshar-e Sargap | Keshar-e Zir | Keshmigi | Khain | Khaledeyn | Khalfani | Khamar-e Qalandaran | Khan-e Guran | Kharabeh | Kharai-ye Bala | Kharai-ye Pain | Kharaji | Kharbechgan | Khargi | Kharkushi | Khashauh | Khersin | Kheyrabad | Kheyrabad | Kheyrabad | Kheyrabad | Khodadadi | Kholus | Khomeyni Shahr | Khomokuh | Khoshkabad | Khowshgizu | Khumen | Khuneh-ye Varz | Khur-e Mollu | Khurhuy | Khuzu | Khvajeh Shamsi | Khvodrowgan | Khvor Chah | Khvor Khurrast | Khvorchah | Khvor-e Khiari | Khvorjal-e Bala | Khvorlul | Khvoshabad | Ki Dar-e Bala | Ki Dar-e Pain | Kiai | Kish | Kohnab-e Bala | Kohnab-e Pain | Kohnak | Kohneh Shahr | Kohur Kalaghi | Kohurestan | Kolahi | Koleybi | Kolombari | Koluchan | Kombaki | Kombil | Konar Baland | Konar Esmail | Konar Siah | Konar Siah | Konar Tanku | Konar Zard | Konaran | Konardan | Konardan-e Sharqi | Konar-e Siah | Konar-e Torsh | Konarju | Konaru | Konderan | Kong | Kongigan | Konji | Kontaki | Kordi Shirazi | Kormi-ye Bala | Kormi-ye Pain | Kormun | Korukan | Koshtaran | Koverdan | Koveyk | Koveyk-e Bala | Kughan | Kuh Badu | Kuh Dazan | Kuh Lahru | Kuh Sefid | Kuh-e Heydar | Kuh-e Olya | Kuh-e Sofla | Kuhestak | Kuhi | Kuhij | Kujak Mahmudi | Kukherd | Kukherd | Kulaghan-e Dartujan | Kulaghan-e Tuman-e Abdollah | Kulaghan-e Tuman-e Gholam Hasan | Kulegh Kalam | Kulegh Kashi | Kuneh | Kunek | Kur | Kuran | Kuran | Kurdan | Kuruj Kollan | Kushah | Kushk | Kushk-e Nar | Kutak | Kutak | Kutak-e Qalat | Kutak-e Rayisi | Kuvehi | Kuy-e Hejrat

=== L ===
Labani | Lafik | Laft | Laft-e Kohneh | Lalami | Lamazan | Larak Shahri | Lardgaram-e Bala | Lardgaram-e Pain | Lardu | Lashtaghan-e Pain va Bala | Lavar | Lavar | Lavaran | Lavardin | Lavar-e Sofla | Lavarkarchi | Lavarmistan | Laygazan | Laygazan | Laz | Leshtani | Limui | Lirak | Lirdaf | Lirehi | Lur

=== M ===
Machi | Madanuiyeh | Madong-e Ahmad | Maghdan | Mah Khatuni | Mahalleh-ye Now | Mahmelian | Mahmud Kolahi | Mahmud Shahi | Mahmudi | Mahmudi | Mahreghan | Makian | Malaki | Mangeli | Maragh | Marang | Maru | Marvarid-e Anjirdan | Maryamabad | Marzan Dar | Mashahran | Mashangi | Mashari | Mashkar | Mastu | Mazagh-e Kurian | Mazavi | Mazegh-e Bala | Mazegh-e Pain | Mazeghgaran | Mazgerd | Mazghu | Mazraeh | Mazraeh-ye Goldasht Nader | Mazraeh-ye Matlubi | Mazraeh-ye Pishu | Mazraeh-ye Tafzali | Mazra-ye Pain | Mehdiabad | Mehmani | Mehr Khowshan | Mehragan | Mehragan-e Bala | Mehragan-e Pain | Mehregi | Merd-e Now | Mesen | Meymand | Mezraku | Mian Chilan | Mian Hanziran | Mian Yili | Miandar | Milaki | Minab | Mir Hoseyni | Mirabad | Mirabi | Miran Guri | Mishi | Miskanak | Mistan | Mobarak Hoseyni | Moga | Mogh Ahmad-e Bala | Mogh Ahmad-e Pain | Mogh Jangan | Mogh Kenar | Mogh Rahmat | Moghdan | Mogh-e Qanbareh-ye Kuh Mobarak | Moghiran | Moghiri | Moghuyeh | Mohammadabad | Mohammadabad | Mohammadabad | Mohammadabad | Mohammadabad-e Kahuri | Mohebbi | Mojtame-ye Emam | Molkan | Molla Hasani | Molla Jamati | Moqsam | Moradabad | Moradi | Morbagh | Mosaferabad | Mosheka ol Din | Moshkuhi | Murd | Murdan | Murdu | Musa Ali

=== N ===
Nahang | Nahend | Najafabad | Nakhl Khin | Nakhl-e Ebrahimi | Nakhl-e Gol | Nakhl-e Jamal | Nakhl-e Yusef | Nakhlemir | Namdar-e Bala | Naqasheh | Naran | Nareh | Narmand | Narmestan | Naserabad | Nashki | Nasirai | Nasri | Nasuiyeh | Natardan | Naz | Nazarabad | Nazgowhar | Negar-e Bala | Negar-e Pain | Nerengan | Nesa | Netamabad | Ney Talkh | Nian | Nil Gary | Nimeh Kar | Nimeh Kar | Nogar Shorq | Nong | Now Band-e Jadid | Now Band-e Qadim | Nowbast | Nowruz Kar | Nowshahr-e Kalangi | Nowshahr-e Surgi | Nozok | Nurabad | Nurabad

=== O ===
Owdui | Owhkan | Owtrang

=== P ===
Pa Garu | Pa Kam-e Bala | Pa Kam-e Pain | Pa Qalatan-e Bala | Pa Qalatan-e Pain | Pabanan | Paband | Paband-e Genow | Pahetek | Palangan | Palangi | Palur | Palur | Pamanbar | Panhar | Par Kuh | Paraf-e Bala | Paraf-e Pain | Parangi | Parapiyun | Parava | Parazan | Parkan-e Al-e Musa | Parkan-e Gishu | Parnimeh | Pas Band | Pas Bast | Pasangar | Pasefid | Pashagh-e Jadid | Pasorkhi | Patal | Patal-e Isin | Patkonan-e Bala | Pay Par | Pay Tavah | Payani | Pazard | Paziarat | Pegu | Persian Gulf Residential Complex | Persian Gulf Ship Building Complex | Petrowki | Pey Posht | Pirchili | Pirui | Pishani-ye Kandeh | Pishdan | Pisheh Gun | Pishunla Key | Piskan | Piveshk | Pochak | Podol | Pol-e Angur | Pol-e Gel Kani | Pol-e Sharqi | Pollehi | Poruzak | Posht Band | Posht Kalat | Posht Tang | Posht-e Kuh | Poshteh Chahu | Poshteh Konji | Poshteh Talang | Poshteh-ye Aliabad | Poshteh-ye Azadegan | Poshteh-ye Gish | Poshteh-ye Gurband | Poshteh-ye Isin | Poshteh-ye Mohnu | Poshteh-ye Ziarat | Poshtgar-e Shah Babek | Poshtkuh-e Abdan | Poshtkuh-e Chakuy | Poshtu | Pudanu | Pulad-e Qasemi | Pur | Pusmen

=== Q ===
Qadamgah-e Bi Bi Shahr Banu | Qadamgah-e Emam Reza | Qadamgah-e Hazrat-e Ali | Qadehar | Qader Khani | Qalam | Qalaman | Qalaman-e Abdollah | Qalamzani | Qalandari | Qalandari | Qalat-e Bala | Qalat-e Pain | Qalat-e Rostam | Qalatuiyeh | Qalatuiyeh-ye Tang-e Salehi | Qaleh Dezh | Qaleh Now | Qaleh Qazi | Qaleh | Qaleh-ye Isin | Qaleh-ye Komiz | Qasemabad | Qasem-e Jelali | Qeshm International Airport | Qeshm | Qil | Qotbabad-e Kohareh

=== R ===
Rabk | Rahbaran | Rahdar | Rahimabad | Railway Residential Complex | Raiz | Ramcha | Rameyleh | Ramkan | Ranaz | Rapij | Rashk | Ravang | Razdar | Razmilu | Razuiyeh | Regab | Renin-e Bozorg | Renin-e Kuchek | Reza Alichi | Rezayi | Rezvan | Rig Deraz | Rig Kag | Rig Muled | Rig | Rig | Rigu | Riku | Roknabad | Ropeka | Rostamabad | Rostamabad | Rostamabad-e Dehvast | Rostami | Rostaq | Rudan | Rudbar | Rudbar | Rud-e Shur | Rukh | Rutan | Ruy Gach | Ruydar | Ruydar

=== S ===
Saadatabad | Sadar | Sagan | Sagarkan | Sahali | Sahilan | Sahtu | Salahu | Salakh | Salehabad | Salmani | Salmehi | Samilan | Samilan-e Bala | Samselu | Sang Band | Sangaki | Sangari Mach | Sang-e Siyah | Sar Gol | Sar Gust-e Bala | Sar Gust-e Pain | Sar Hur | Sar Kahnan | Sar Kahnan | Sar Kam Bahmani | Sar Korukan | Sar Molla | Sar Rig | Sar Rig | Sar Rig-e Dum | Sar Rig-e Owl | Sar Rig-e Sum | Sar Samad | Sar Shif | Sar Tang | Sar Tang-e Darreh Shir | Sar Tit Kan | Sar Zeh | Sar Zeh-ye Sofla | Sarah | Sarah-e Shadadi | Saran-e Barshaku | Sararu | Sarband | Sarband | Sarband-e Parangi | Sarbaran | Sarbir | Sarchahan | Sarchil | Sardang-e Komiz | Sardar | Sardar | Sardarah | Sardasht | Sardasht | Sarderang | Sar-e Balm | Sar-e Gaz-e Ahmadi | Sargalm | Sargalm | Sargaz-e Khazor Safakalinu | Sargodar-e Kalatu | Sarjuiyeh | Sarkahnan-e Davari | Sarkam | Sarkam | Sarkha-ye Pain | Sarkhun | Sarkhur Tahruyi | Sarkom | Sarkontkan | Sarmast | Sarmazegh | Sarrigan | Sarzeh Al-e Mehtarian | Sarzeh Kharuk | Sarzeh Posht Band | Sarzeh Shamil | Sarzeh | Sarzeh | Sarzeh | Sarzeh-ye Charkan | Sayeh Khvosh | Sedich | Sefid Kuh | Segh | Seh Konar-e Olya | Seh Shah | Sekal | Selerd | Senderk | Senderk | Setolu | Seyfabad | Seyyed Ahmadi | Seyyed Jowzar | Seyyedabad | Shadini Zehi | Shah Avazi | Shah Babak | Shah Bazan | Shah Mansuri | Shahid Darvishi Defense Complex | Shahmoradi | Shahr Jadid-e Alvi | Shahrak-e Aliabad | Shahrak-e Darjetan Ebrahimi | Shahrak-e Emam Khomeyni | Shahrak-e Gabrik | Shahrak-e Mohammadabad | Shahrak-e Parvaz | Shahrak-e Salehabad | Shahrak-e Sarkhadh | Shahrak-e Shahid Namju | Shahrak-e Shahid Rajai | Shahrak-e Sizadehaban | Shahrak-e Tavanir | Shahr-e Kohneh | Shahr-e Shib | Shahr-e Shib Kalah | Shahri | Shahrow | Shahrow | Shahrud | Shahvarpalur | Sham Ju | Sham Siahan | Shamardi | Shambiran | Shamil | Shamil-e Bala | Shamju | Shaqrud | Sharikabad | Shayhowli | Shekaruyeh | Shemshi | Sheykh Ali | Sheykh Amr | Sheykh Hozur | Shib Deraz | Shibkuh | Shimilu | Shingu | Shir Ahan | Shir Ahan Shahr | Shirish | Shivehi | Shoghu | Shokrabad | Shomjuiyeh | Shurayi | Si Khvoran-e Bala | Siah Moghan-e Bala | Siah Moghan-e Pain | Siah Tak | Siah Takan-e Pain | Siahak | Sikhuran | Sikui | Sirik | Sirik-e Kohneh | Sirmach | Sirmand | Siruiyeh | Sit | Sit | Sit | Sit-e Bandkharas | Siyahu | Sizeh | Sobohti | Sohrabi | Sohran | Sohran | Sohroki | Solubalm | Somsili | Sorkh Dan | Sorkh Kuh | Sorkhangi | Suderu | Sul | Suleqan | Sur Chah-e Bala | Sur Chah-e Pain | Surgalm | Surobash | Suru | Suza

=== T ===
Tabl | Tahar | Taheri | Tahlu | Tahlu | Tahrui | Tahtan | Taj | Takht | Takht-e Goru | Tal | Taladar-e Nakhlestan | Talang-e Anbari | Talang-e Saratak | Talar | Tal-e Gerdu | Talkh-e Ataher | Tall Qaleh-ye Pain | Tall-e Siah | Talmara | Talok | Talsuru | Talvar | Tam Babol | Tambaseyun-e Kuh Mobarak | Tang Ashkan | Tang Dalan | Tang Gach | Tang-e Bagh | Tang-e Bastak | Tang-e Daf | Tang-e Quchan | Tang-e Rud | Tanghet | Taratekan | Tarbuyeh | Tareh-ye Ashayiri | Tarom | Tashkuiyeh | Tashto | Tazian-e Bala | Tazian-e Pain | Tejak | Terbakestan | Terish | Tesan | Teybi Shahi | Tezerj | Tiab | Tiab | Tidar | Tidar | Tifakan | Tigh Siah | Tiku | Tirahmad | Tirandazi | Tirur | Tishan | Tisur | Tit Kan | Tiyab-e Khunsorkh | Tizej | Todruyeh | Tolombeh-ye Hoseynabad | Tom Baluchan | Tom Malantaki | Tombak-e Bala | Tombak-e Pain | Tomban | Tombanu | Tomb-e Gowhar | Tomb-e Sat | Tombu Jonubi | Tombu Shomali | Tombu-e Bala | Tombu-e Pain | Tom-e Khvajeh Bahmani | Tomges | Tomparitak | Tomsenati | Tonb Bariku | Tonb-e Bongeru | Tonb-e Jaki | Tonb-e Siyak | Tuganjak | Tuj | Tujan | Tujidar | Tukahur | Tula | Tuman Ahmad | Tuman Rahi | Tunb-e Bozorg | Turian | Tushahr | Tutang

=== V ===
Vadasht | Vadi Ahmad | Vadiabad | Vaen | Vanak | Varevench | Vaziri | Vey

=== Y ===
Yas Do Chang | Yord-e Basravi | Yord-e Khalaf | Yord-e Khordu | Yord-e Qasemali

=== Z ===
Zabr | Zach Darbast | Zahak-e Pain | Zahrikar | Zakin | Zamin Lashkari | Zamin Sang | Zaminan | Zamindar | Zamin-e Hansin | Zamin-e Molla | Zamin-e Sabah | Zamin-e Siah | Zamin-e Tuman | Zangard | Zanhi | Zankuteh | Zarabad | Zarabad | Zard-e Sham | Zarru Kan | Zartuji | Zeh Badi | Zeh Hoseyn | Zehuki | Zemin-e Hasan | Zevadu | Zeynabi | Ziarat Mowla | Ziarat | Ziarat | Ziarat | Ziarat | Ziarat-e Ali | Ziarat-e Bozorg | Ziarat-e Hasanabad | Ziarat-e Pakuh | Ziarat-e Pirchugan | Ziarat-e Seyyed Soleyman | Ziarat-e Talang | Zigadaf | Zirang | Ziruki | Zohab | Zohbarak | Zohuki | Zoratu Bala | Zoratu Pain | Zorrati
