= Bajani =

Bajani باجاني
- Village
- Location within Iran
- Coordinates: 27°41′32″N 57°15′04″E
- Country: Iran
- Province: Hormozgan
- County: Rudan
- Bakhsh: Rudkhaneh
- Rural District: Rudkhaneh

Population (2006)
  - Total: 100
- Time zone: UTC+3:30 (IRST)
  - Summer (DST): UTC+4:30 (IRDT)

Bajani (Persian: باجاني, also Romanized as Bājānī) is a village in Rudkhaneh Rural District, Rudkhaneh District, Rudan County, Hormozgan Province, Iran. As of the 2006 census, the village's population is 100. The village contains 22 families.
