= Jushki =

Jushki جوشكي
- Village
- Location within Iran
- Coordinates: 27°00′43″N 57°03′30″E
- Country: Iran
- Province: Hormozgan
- County: Minab
- Bakhsh: Central
- Rural District: Band-e Zarak

Population (2006)
  - Total: 410
- Time zone: UTC+3:30 (IRST)
  - Summer (DST): UTC+4:30 (IRDT)

Jushki (Persian: جوشكي, also Romanized as Jūshkī) is a village in Band-e Zarak Rural District, in the Central District of Minab County, Hormozgan Province, Iran. At the 2006 census, its population was 410, in 69 families.
