= Shimilu =

Shimilu شميلو
- Village
- Location within Iran
- Coordinates: 26°59′38″N 57°00′59″E
- Country: Iran
- Province: Hormozgan
- County: Minab
- Bakhsh: Central
- Rural District: Band-e Zarak

Population (2006)
  - Total: 94
- Time zone: UTC+3:30 (IRST)
  - Summer (DST): UTC+4:30 (IRDT)

Shimilu (Persian: شميلو, also Romanized as Shīmīlū; also known as Shīmīlī) is a village in Band-e Zarak Rural District, in the Central District of Minab County, Hormozgan Province, Iran. At the 2006 census, its population was 94, in 17 families.
