= Gajg-e Poshtkuh =

Gajg-e Poshtkuh گجگ پشتكوه
- Village
- Location within Iran
- Coordinates: 27°38′51″N 56°43′40″E
- Country: Iran
- Province: Hormozgan
- County: Bandar Abbas
- Bakhsh: shamil
- Rural District: Shamil

Population (2006)
  - Total: 153
- Time zone: UTC+3:30 (IRST)
  - Summer (DST): UTC+4:30 (IRDT)

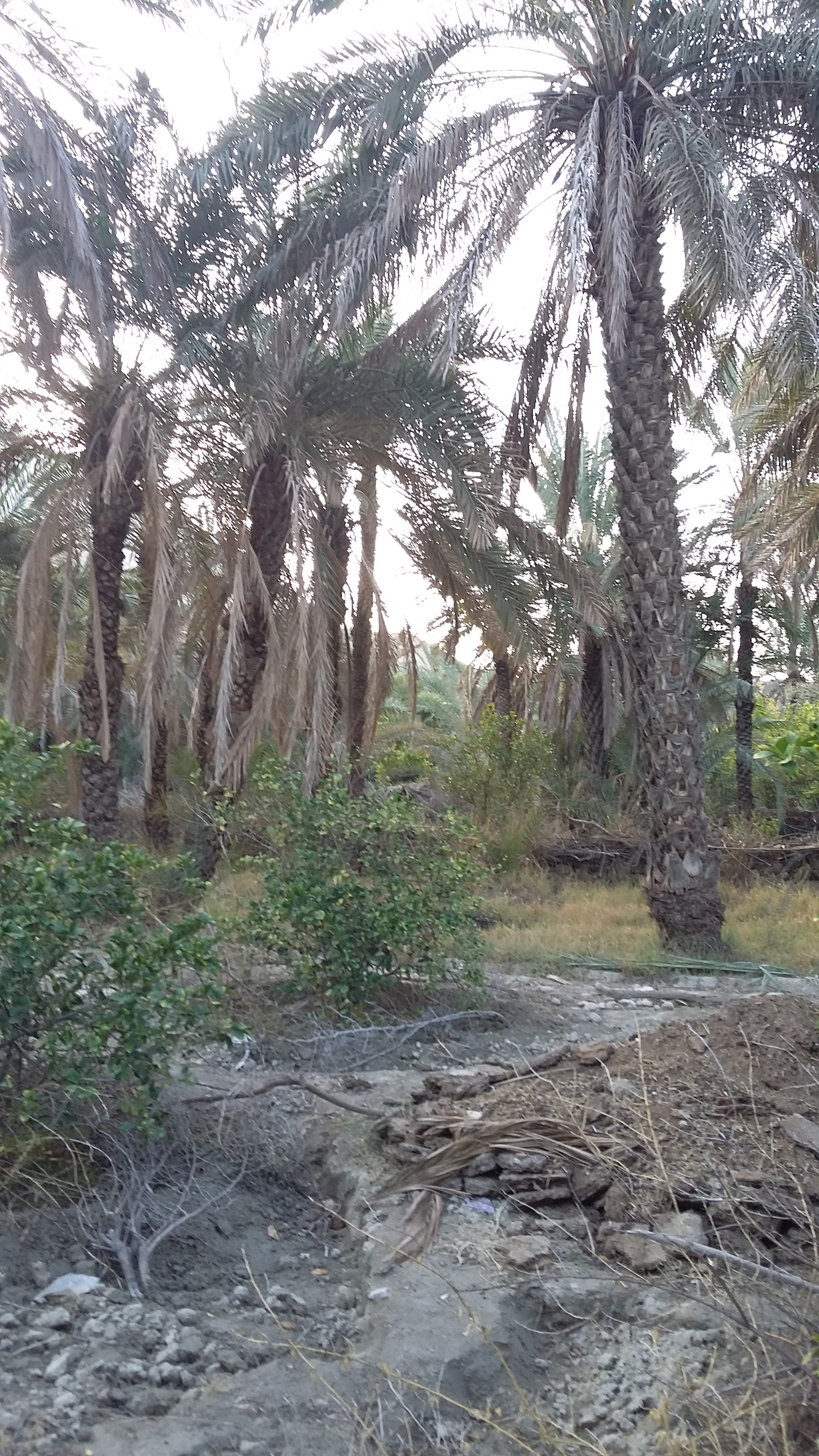

Gajg-e Poshtkuh (Persian: گجگ پشتكوه, also Romanized as Gajg-e Poshtkūh and Gojg-e Poshtkūh; also known as Govājag-e Pāpar) is a village in Poshtkuh-e Shamil پشتکوه شمیل at Shamil Rural District, shamil District, Bandar Abbas County, Hormozgan Province, Iran. At the 2006 census, its population was 153, in 39 families.
