= Bastu, Iran =

Bastu بستو
- Village
- Location within Iran
- Coordinates: 27°25′15″N 55°23′49″E
- Country: Iran
- Province: Hormozgan
- County: Khamir
- Bakhsh: Ruydar
- Rural District: Ruydar

Population (2006)
  - Total: 171
- Time zone: UTC+3:30 (IRST)
  - Summer (DST): UTC+4:30 (IRDT)

Bastu (Persian: بستو, also Romanized as Bastū; also known as Bīsta’ū and Bīstūyeh) is a village in Ruydar Rural District, Ruydar District, Khamir County, Hormozgan Province, Iran. At the 2006 census, its population was 171, in 30 families.
