= Sirik-e Kohneh, Iran =

Village in Hormozgan province, Iran

Sirik-e Kohneh Persian: سيريك كهنه
- Village
- Location within Iran
- Coordinates: 26°30′19″N 57°07′18″E
- Country: Iran
- Province: Hormozgan
- County: Sirik
- District: Central
- Rural District: Sirik

Population (2016)
  - Total: 347
- Time zone: UTC+3:30 (IRST)

Sirik-e Kohneh (Persian: سيريك كهنه) (Note: Also romanized as Sīrīk-e Kohneh) is a village in Sirik Rural District of the Central District of Sirik County, Hormozgan province, Iran.

== Demographics ==
=== Population ===
At the time of the 2006 National Census, the village's population was 294 in 39 households. The following census in 2011 counted 334 people in 75 households. The 2016 census measured the population of the village as 347 people in 88 households.
