= Sar Samad =

Sar Samad سرسماد
- Village
- Location within Iran
- Coordinates: 27°28′51″N 56°49′12″E
- Country: Iran
- Province: Hormozgan
- County: Bandar Abbas
- Bakhsh: Takht
- Rural District: Shamil

Population (2006)
  - Total: 263
- Time zone: UTC+3:30 (IRST)
  - Summer (DST): UTC+4:30 (IRDT)

Sar Samad (Persian: سرسماد, also Romanized as Sar Samād and Sar Şamad) is a village in Shamil Rural District, Takht District, Bandar Abbas County, Hormozgan Province, Iran. At the 2006 census, its population was 263, in 63 families.
