= Bagh Jafar =

Bagh Jafar باغ جعفر
- Village
- Location within Iran
- Coordinates: 27°49′15″N 57°17′20″E
- Country: Iran
- Province: Hormozgan
- County: Rudan
- Bakhsh: Rudkhaneh
- Rural District: Rudkhaneh Bar

Population (2006)
  - Total: 24
- Time zone: UTC+3:30 (IRST)
  - Summer (DST): UTC+4:30 (IRDT)

Bagh Jafar (Persian: باغ جعفر, also Romanized as Bāgh Ja‘far) is a village in Rudkhaneh Bar Rural District, Rudkhaneh District, Rudan County, Hormozgan Province, Iran. At the 2006 census, its population was 24, in 6 families.
