= Berkeh Doka =

Berkeh Doka بركه دكا
- Village
- Location within Iran
- Coordinates: 27°16′26″N 52°56′05″E
- Country: Iran
- Province: Hormozgan
- County: Parsian
- Bakhsh: Kushk-e Nar
- Rural District: Kushk-e Nar

Population (2006)
  - Total: 800
- Time zone: UTC+3:30 (IRST)
  - Summer (DST): UTC+4:30 (IRDT)

Berkeh Doka (Persian: بركه دكا, also Romanized as Berkeh Dokā and Berkeh-ye Dokā’; also known as Berkeh Dokān, Berkeh Dūkūn, Berkeh-ye Dowkā, Berkeh-ye Dūkā’, Birkeh Dugān, Deh Gūn, and Dūkūn) is a village in Kushk-e Nar Rural District, Kushk-e Nar District, Parsian County, Hormozgan Province, Iran. At the 2006 census, its population was 800, in 139 families.
