= Deh Gel Kan =

Deh Gel Kan ده گل كن
- Village
- Location within Iran
- Coordinates: 27°20′06″N 57°11′34″E
- Country: Iran
- Province: Hormozgan
- County: Rudan
- Bakhsh: Bikah
- Rural District: Bikah

Population (2006)
  - Total: 936
- Time zone: UTC+3:30 (IRST)
  - Summer (DST): UTC+4:30 (IRDT)

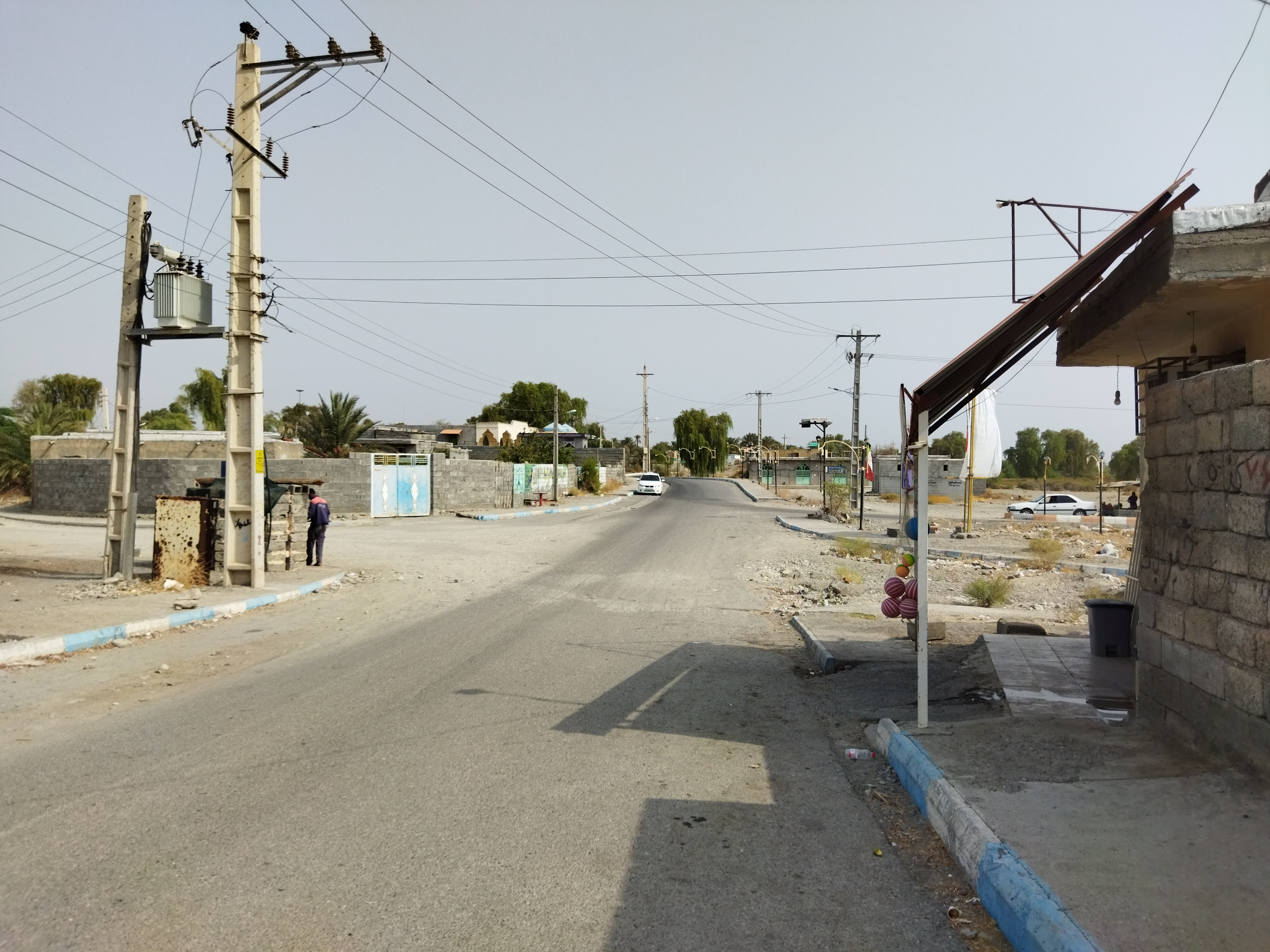

Deh Gel Kan (Persian: ده گل كن, also Romanized as Deh Gelkan) is a village in Bikah Rural District, Bikah District, Rudan County, Hormozgan Province, Iran. At the 2006 census, its population was 936, in 211 families.
