= Abkuhi =

Abkuhi ابكوهي
- Village
- Location within Iran
- Coordinates: 25°25′03″N 59°07′06″E
- Country: Iran
- Province: Hormozgan
- County: Jask
- Bakhsh: Lirdaf
- Rural District: Piveshk

Population (2006)
  - Total: 409
- Time zone: UTC+3:30 (IRST)
  - Summer (DST): UTC+4:30 (IRDT)

Abkuhi (Persian: ابكوهي, also Romanized as Ābkūhī; also known as Ābgūhī and Meydānī) is a village in Piveshk Rural District, Lirdaf District, Jask County, Hormozgan Province, Iran. As of the 2006 census, its population was 409, in 86 families.
