= Kahurdan =

Kahurdan كهوردان
- Village
- Location within Iran
- Coordinates: 26°58′41″N 57°12′41″E
- Country: Iran
- Province: Hormozgan
- County: Minab
- Bakhsh: Central
- Rural District: Karian

Population (2006)
  - Total: 430
- Time zone: UTC+3:30 (IRST)
  - Summer (DST): UTC+4:30 (IRDT)

Kahurdan (Persian: كهوردان, also Romanized as Kahūrdān; also known as Kāhūdān) is a village in Karian Rural District, in the Central District of Minab County, Hormozgan Province, Iran. At the 2006 census, its population was 430, in 84 families.
