= Sar Korukan =

Sar Korukan سركروكان
- Village
- Location within Iran
- Coordinates: 27°46′53″N 57°12′38″E
- Country: Iran
- Province: Hormozgan
- County: Rudan
- Bakhsh: Rudkhaneh
- Rural District: Mosaferabad

Population (2006)
  - Total: 70
- Time zone: UTC+3:30 (IRST)
  - Summer (DST): UTC+4:30 (IRDT)

Sar Korukan (Persian: سركروكان, also Romanized as Sar Korūkān) is a village in Mosaferabad Rural District, Rudkhaneh District, Rudan County, Hormozgan Province, Iran. At the 2006 census, its population was 70, in 13 families.
