= Talmara =

Talmara تل مرا
- Village
- Location within Iran
- Coordinates: 27°57′14″N 56°02′43″E
- Country: Iran
- Province: Hormozgan
- County: Hajjiabad
- Bakhsh: Fareghan
- Rural District: Ashkara

Population (2006)
  - Total: 47
- Time zone: UTC+3:30 (IRST)
  - Summer (DST): UTC+4:30 (IRDT)

Talmara (Persian: تل مرا, also Romanized as Tālmarā) is a village in Ashkara Rural District, Fareghan District, Hajjiabad County, Hormozgan Province, Iran. At the 2006 census, its population was 47, in 14 families.
