= Dasht-e Ashkara =

Dasht-e Ashkara دشت اشكارا
- Village
- Country: Iran
- Province: Hormozgan
- County: Hajjiabad
- Bakhsh: Fareghan
- Rural District: Ashkara

Population (2006)
  - Total: 1,240
- Time zone: UTC+3:30 (IRST)
  - Summer (DST): UTC+4:30 (IRDT)

Dasht-e Ashkara (Persian: دشت اشكارا, also Romanized as Dasht-e Ashkārā) is a village in Ashkara Rural District, Fareghan District, Hajjiabad County, Hormozgan Province, Iran. At the 2006 census, its population was 1,240, in 277 families.
