= Basteh =

Basteh بسته
- Village
- Location within Iran
- Coordinates: 27°59′46″N 56°17′42″E
- Country: Iran
- Province: Hormozgan
- County: Hajjiabad
- Bakhsh: Fareghan
- Rural District: Fareghan

Population (2006)
  - Total: 153
- Time zone: UTC+3:30 (IRST)
  - Summer (DST): UTC+4:30 (IRDT)

Basteh (Persian: بسته) is a village in Fareghan Rural District, Fareghan District, Hajjiabad County, Hormozgan Province, Iran. At the 2006 census, its population was 153, in 44 families.
