= Pashagh-e Jadid =

Pashagh-e Jadid پاشغ جديد
- Village
- Location within Iran
- Coordinates: 27°58′29″N 56°38′14″E
- Country: Iran
- Province: Hormozgan
- County: Hajjiabad
- Bakhsh: Ahmadi
- Rural District: Ahmadi

Population (2006)
  - Total: 534
- Time zone: UTC+3:30 (IRST)
  - Summer (DST): UTC+4:30 (IRDT)

Pashagh Village’s Board

Pashagh-e Jadid (Persian: پاشغ جديد, also Romanized as Pāshagh-e Jadīd; also known as Pāshagh) is a village in Ahmadi Rural District, Ahmadi District, Hajjiabad County, Hormozgan Province, Iran. At the 2006 census, its population was 534, in 119 families.
