= Mir Hoseyni =

Mir Hoseyni ميرحسيني
- Village
- Location within Iran
- Coordinates: 27°57′23″N 56°39′47″E
- Country: Iran
- Province: Hormozgan
- County: Hajjiabad
- Bakhsh: Ahmadi
- Rural District: Ahmadi

Population (2006)
  - Total: 301
- Time zone: UTC+3:30 (IRST)
  - Summer (DST): UTC+4:30 (IRDT)

Mir Hoseyni (Persian: ميرحسيني, also Romanized as Mīr Ḩoseynī; also known as Mīr Ḩasanī) is a village in Ahmadi Rural District, Ahmadi District, Hajjiabad County, Hormozgan Province, Iran. At the 2006 census, its population was 301, in 65 families.
