= Chahkhodru =

Chahkhodru چاه خودرو
- Village
- Location within Iran
- Coordinates: 26°55′35″N 55°09′11″E
- Country: Iran
- Province: Hormozgan
- County: Bandar Lengeh
- Bakhsh: Central
- Rural District: Mehran

Population (2006)
  - Total: 135
- Time zone: UTC+3:30 (IRST)
  - Summer (DST): UTC+4:30 (IRDT)

Chahkhodru (Persian: چاه خودرو, also Romanized as Chāhkhodrū) is a village in Mehran Rural District, in the Central District of Bandar Lengeh County, Hormozgan Province, Iran. At the 2006 census, its population was 135, in 30 families.
