= Ab-e Mosla =

Ab-e Mosla اب مصلي
- Village
- Location within Iran
- Coordinates: 27°21′57″N 55°38′23″E
- Country: Iran
- Province: Hormozgan
- County: Khamir
- Bakhsh: Ruydar
- Rural District: Rudbar

Population (2006)
  - Total: 39
- Time zone: UTC+3:30 (IRST)
  - Summer (DST): UTC+4:30 (IRDT)

Ab-e Mosla (Persian: اب مصلي, also Romanized as Āb-e Moslà) is a village in Rudbar Rural District, Ruydar District, Khamir County, Hormozgan province, Iran. At the 2006 census, its population was 39, in 10 families.
