= Pulad-e Qasemi =

Pulad-e Qasemi پولاد قاسمي
- Village
- Location within Iran
- Coordinates: 27°07′43″N 57°03′12″E
- Country: Iran
- Province: Hormozgan
- County: Minab
- Bakhsh: Central
- Rural District: Band-e Zarak

Population (2006)
  - Total: 1,392
- Time zone: UTC+3:30 (IRST)
  - Summer (DST): UTC+4:30 (IRDT)

Pulad-e Qasemi (Persian: پولاد قاسمي, also Romanized as Pūlād-e Qāsemī; also known as Fūlād Qāsemī) is a village in Band-e Zarak Rural District, in the Central District of Minab County, Hormozgan Province, Iran. At the 2006 census, its population was 1,392, in 261 families.
