= Khain =

Khain خايين
- Village
- Location within Iran
- Coordinates: 27°45′30″N 55°36′11″E
- Country: Iran
- Province: Hormozgan
- County: Bandar Abbas
- Bakhsh: Fin
- Rural District: Fin

Population (2006)
  - Total: 68
- Time zone: UTC+3:30 (IRST)
  - Summer (DST): UTC+4:30 (IRDT)

Khain (Persian: خايين, also Romanized as Khā’īn; also known as Khū’īn) is a village in Fin Rural District, Fin District, Bandar Abbas County, Hormozgan Province, Iran. At the 2006 census, its population was 68, in 11 families.
