= Tombak-e Pain =

Tombek-e Pain تمبك پائين
- Village
- Location within Iran
- Coordinates: 27°05′09″N 57°00′57″E
- Country: Iran
- Province: Hormozgan
- County: Minab
- Bakhsh: Central
- Rural District: Howmeh

Population (2006)
  - Total: 672
- Time zone: UTC+3:30 (IRST)
  - Summer (DST): UTC+4:30 (IRDT)

Tombek-e Pain (Persian: تمبك پائين, also Romanized as Tombek-e Pā’īn; and Tombek) is a village in Howmeh Rural District, in the Central District of Minab County, Hormozgan Province, Iran. At the 2006 census, its population was 672, in 133 families.
