= Mahreghan =

Mahreghan مه رغان
- Village
- Location within Iran
- Coordinates: 27°13′33″N 57°02′05″E
- Country: Iran
- Province: Hormozgan
- County: Minab
- Bakhsh: Central
- Rural District: Gurband

Population (2006)
  - Total: 138
- Time zone: UTC+3:30 (IRST)
  - Summer (DST): UTC+4:30 (IRDT)

Mahreghan (Persian: مه رغان, also Romanized as Mahreghān) is a village in Gurband Rural District, in the Central District of Minab County, Hormozgan Province, Iran. At the 2006 census, its population was 138, in 34 families.
