= Barasht-e Bala =

Barasht-e Bala براشت بالا
- Village
- Location of Barasht-e Bala in the Persian Gulf
- Coordinates: 27.1480°N 54.8344°E
- Country: Iran
- Province: Hormozgan
- County: Bastak
- Bakhsh: Central
- Rural District: Fatuyeh
- Time zone: UTC+3:30 (IRST)
  - Summer (DST): UTC+4:30 (IRDT)

Barasht-e Bala (Persian: براشت بالا, also Romanized as Barāsht-e Bālā) is a village in Fatuyeh Rural District, in the Central District of Bastak County, Hormozgan Province, Iran. At the 2006 census, its existence was noted, but its population was not reported.
