= Golongu =

Golongu گلنگو
- Village
- Location within Iran
- Coordinates: 26°48′13″N 54°30′40″E
- Country: Iran
- Province: Hormozgan
- County: Bandar Lengeh
- Bakhsh: Central
- Rural District: Moghuyeh

Population (2006)
  - Total: 30
- Time zone: UTC+3:30 (IRST)
  - Summer (DST): UTC+4:30 (IRDT)

Golongu (Persian: گلنگو, also Romanized as Golongū and Golangū; also known as Galangoor) is a village in Moghuyeh Rural District, in the Central District of Bandar Lengeh County, Hormozgan Province, Iran. At the 2006 census, its population was 60, in 10 families.
