= Sarbir =

Sarbir سربير
- Village
- Location within Iran
- Coordinates: 26°22′00″N 58°02′00″E
- Country: Iran
- Province: Hormozgan
- County: Bashagard
- Bakhsh: Gafr and Parmon
- Rural District: Gafr and Parmon

Population (2006)
  - Total: 59
- Time zone: UTC+3:30 (IRST)
  - Summer (DST): UTC+4:30 (IRDT)

Sarbir (Persian: سربير, also Romanized as Sarbīr) is a village in Gafr and Parmon Rural District, Gafr and Parmon District, Bashagard County, Hormozgan Province, Iran. At the 2006 census, its population was 59, in 16 families.
