= Tushahr =

Tushahr توشهر
- Village
- Location within Iran
- Coordinates: 27°56′10″N 56°39′50″E
- Country: Iran
- Province: Hormozgan
- County: Hajjiabad
- Bakhsh: Ahmadi
- Rural District: Ahmadi

Population (2006)
  - Total: 345
- Time zone: UTC+3:30 (IRST)
  - Summer (DST): UTC+4:30 (IRDT)

Tushahr (Persian: توشهر, also Romanized as Tūshahr; also known as Tūshahr-e Aḩmadī) is a village in Ahmadi Rural District, Ahmadi District, Hajjiabad County, Hormozgan Province, Iran. As of the 2006 census, its population was 345, in 85 families.
