= Borkohnak =

Borkohnak بركهنك
- Village
- Country: Iran
- Province: Hormozgan
- County: Bashagard
- Bakhsh: Gafr and Parmon
- Rural District: Gafr and Parmon

Population (2006)
  - Total: 249
- Time zone: UTC+3:30 (IRST)
  - Summer (DST): UTC+4:30 (IRDT)

Borkohnak (Persian: بركهنك) is a village in Gafr and Parmon Rural District, Gafr and Parmon District, Bashagard County, Hormozgan Province, Iran. At the 2006 census, its population was 249, in 38 families.
