= Kahur Ryis Abbas =

Kahur Ryis Abbas كهور رئيس عباس
- Village
- Location within Iran
- Coordinates: 27°15′55″N 57°28′07″E
- Country: Iran
- Province: Hormozgan
- County: Rudan
- Bakhsh: Jaghin
- Rural District: Jaghin-e Shomali

Population (2006)
  - Total: 94
- Time zone: UTC+3:30 (IRST)
  - Summer (DST): UTC+4:30 (IRDT)

Kahur Ryis Abbas (Persian: كهور رئيس عباس, also Romanized as Kahūr Ryīs ʿAbbās; also known as Kahūr Reesabbās) is a village in Jaghin-e Shomali Rural District, Jaghin District, Rudan County, Hormozgan Province, Iran. At the 2006 census, its population was 94, in 24 families.
