= Zartuji =

Zartuji زرتوجي
- Village
- Location within Iran
- Coordinates: 27°01′43″N 57°13′14″E
- Country: Iran
- Province: Hormozgan
- County: Minab
- Bakhsh: Central
- Rural District: Karian

Population (2006)
  - Total: 1,423
- Time zone: UTC+3:30 (IRST)
  - Summer (DST): UTC+4:30 (IRDT)

Zartuji (Persian: زرتوجي, also Romanized as Zartūjī; also known as Zartūchī) is a village in Karian Rural District, in the Central District of Minab County, Hormozgan Province, Iran. At the 2006 census, its population was 1,423, in 292 families.
