= Kahnu Shotori =

Kahnu Shotori كهنوشتري
- Village
- Location within Iran
- Coordinates: 27°15′51″N 57°15′10″E
- Country: Iran
- Province: Hormozgan
- County: Rudan
- Bakhsh: Bikah
- Rural District: Berentin

Population (2006)
  - Total: 272
- Time zone: UTC+3:30 (IRST)
  - Summer (DST): UTC+4:30 (IRDT)

Kahnu Shotori (Persian: كهنوشتري, also Romanized as Kahnū Shotorī; also known as Kahnūj-e Shotorī) is a village in Berentin Rural District, Bikah District, Rudan County, Hormozgan Province, Iran. At the 2006 census, its population was 272, in 54 families.
