= Dargir =

Dargir درگير
- Village
- Location within Iran
- Coordinates: 27°19′51″N 56°13′23″E
- Country: Iran
- Province: Hormozgan
- County: Bandar Abbas
- Bakhsh: Central
- Rural District: Isin

Population (2006)
  - Total: 1,310
- Time zone: UTC+3:30 (IRST)
  - Summer (DST): UTC+4:30 (IRDT)

Dargir (Persian: درگير, also Romanized as Dargīr and Dar Gīr) is a village in Isin Rural District, in the Central District of Bandar Abbas County, Hormozgan Province, Iran. At the 2006 census, its population was 1,310, in 299 families.
