= Bujerash =

Bujerash بوجراش
- Village
- Location within Iran
- Coordinates: 26°52′33″N 53°43′08″E
- Country: Iran
- Province: Hormozgan
- County: Bandar Lengeh
- Bakhsh: Shibkaveh
- Rural District: Moqam

Population (2006)
  - Total: 125
- Time zone: UTC+3:30 (IRST)
  - Summer (DST): UTC+4:30 (IRDT)

Bujerash (Persian: بوجراش, also Romanized as Būjerāsh) is a village in Moqam Rural District, Shibkaveh District, Bandar Lengeh County, Hormozgan Province, Iran. At the 2006 census, its population was 125, in 23 families.
