= Yas Do Chang =

Coordinates: 27.1111°N 54.3167°E

Yas Do Chang يس دوچنگ
- Village
- Interactive map of Yas Do Chang
- Country: Iran
- Province: Hormozgan
- County: Bastak
- Bakhsh: Kukherd
- Rural District: Kukherd

Population (2006)
  - Total: 30
- Time zone: UTC+3:30 (IRST)
  - Summer (DST): UTC+4:30 (IRDT)

Yas Do Chang (Persian: يس دوچنگ; also Romanized as Pas Do Chang) is a village in Kukherd Rural District, Kukherd District, Bastak County, Hormozgan Province, Iran. At the 2006 census, its population was 30, in seven families.
