= Dasht Azadgan =

Dasht Azadgan دشت آزادگان
- Village
- Location within Iran
- Coordinates: 28°27′13″N 55°53′06″E
- Country: Iran
- Province: Hormozgan
- County: Hajjiabad
- Bakhsh: Central
- Rural District: Dar Agah

Population (2006)
  - Total: 71
- Time zone: UTC+3:30 (IRST)
  - Summer (DST): UTC+4:30 (IRDT)

Dasht Azadgan (Persian: دشت آزادگان, also Romanized as Dasht Āzādgān; also known as Deq Dozdān) is a village in Dar Agah Rural District, in the Central District of Hajjiabad County, Hormozgan Province, Iran. At the 2006 census, its population was 71, in 22 families.
