= Teybi Shahi =

Teybi Shahi تي بي شاهي
- Village
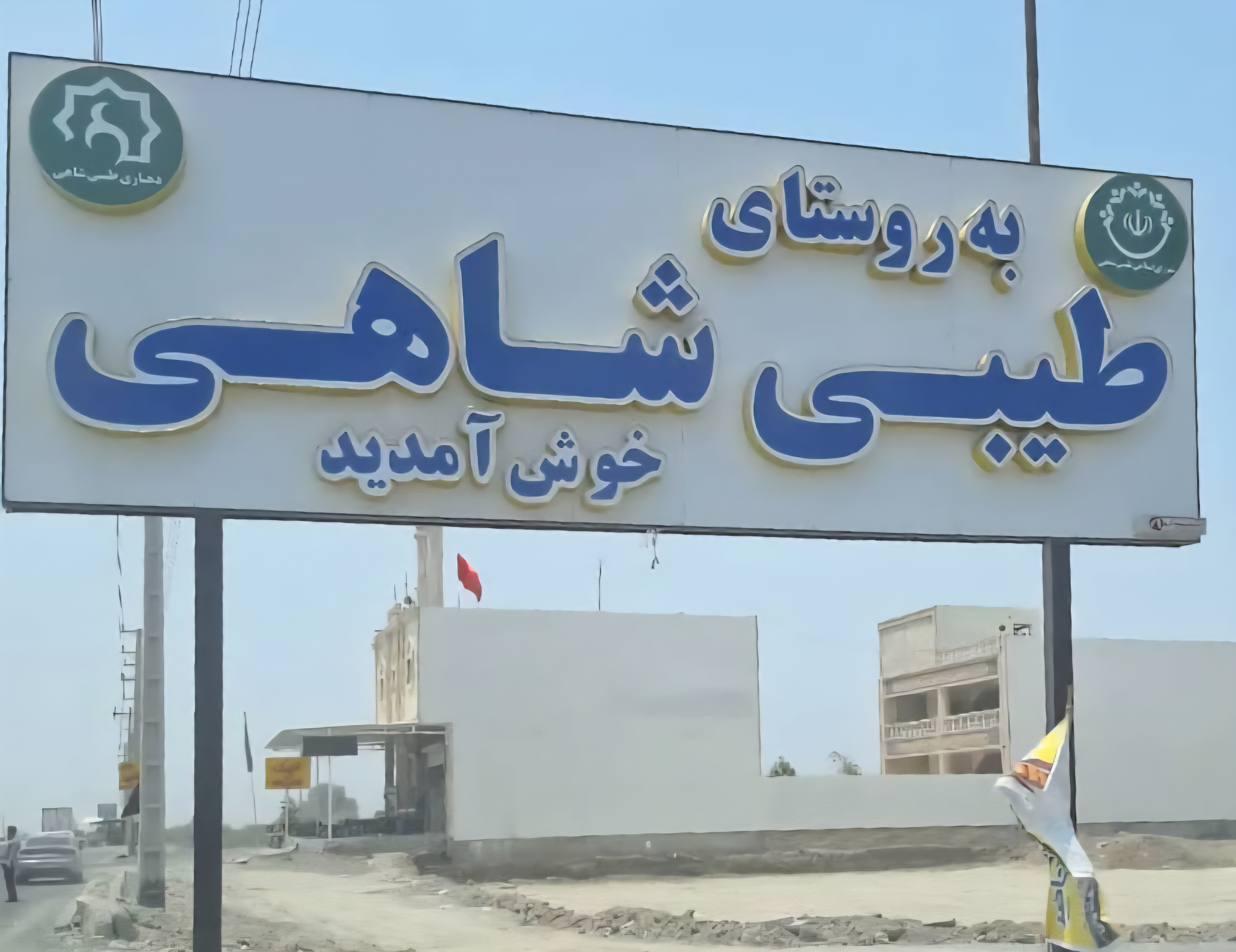

- Location within Iran
- Coordinates: 27°07′26″N 57°03′14″E
- Country: Iran
- Province: Hormozgan
- County: Minab
- Bakhsh: Central
- Rural District: Band-e Zarak

Population (2006)
  - Total: 594
- Time zone: UTC+3:30 (IRST)
  - Summer (DST): UTC+4:30 (IRDT)

Teybi Shahi (Persian: تي بي شاهي, also Romanized as Ţeybī Shāhī and Tībī Shāhī) is a village in Band-e Zarak Rural District, in the Central District of Minab County, Hormozgan Province, Iran. At the 2006 census, its population was 594, in 118 families.
