= Pasorkhi =

Pasorkhi پاسرخي
- Village
- Location within Iran
- Coordinates: 27°23′52″N 57°17′45″E
- Country: Iran
- Province: Hormozgan
- County: Rudan
- Bakhsh: Central
- Rural District: Abnama

Population (2006)
  - Total: 30
- Time zone: UTC+3:30 (IRST)
  - Summer (DST): UTC+4:30 (IRDT)

Pasorkhi (Persian: پاسرخي, also Romanized as Pāsorkhī) is a village in Abnama Rural District, in the Central District of Rudan County, Hormozgan Province, Iran. At the 2006 census, its population was 30, in 5 families.
