= Badafshan-e Pain =

Badafshan-e Pain بادافشان پايين
- Village
- Location within Iran
- Coordinates: 27°34′00″N 57°09′20″E
- Country: Iran
- Province: Hormozgan
- County: Rudan
- Bakhsh: Central
- Rural District: Rahdar

Population (2006)
  - Total: 30
- Time zone: UTC+3:30 (IRST)
  - Summer (DST): UTC+4:30 (IRDT)

Badafshan-e Pain (Persian: بادافشان پايين, also Romanized as Bādafshān-e Pā’īn; also known as Gāshū Pā’īn) is a village in Rahdar Rural District, in the Central District of Rudan County, Hormozgan Province, Iran. At the 2006 census, its population was 30, in 8 families.
