= Chah Goda =

Chah Goda چاه گدا
- Village
- Location within Iran
- Coordinates: 27°37′31″N 57°14′03″E
- Country: Iran
- Province: Hormozgan
- County: Rudan
- Bakhsh: Rudkhaneh
- Rural District: Rudkhaneh Bar

Population (2006)
  - Total: 18
- Time zone: UTC+3:30 (IRST)
  - Summer (DST): UTC+4:30 (IRDT)

Chah Goda (Persian: چاه گدا, also Romanized as Chāh Godā; also known as Chāh Khodā) is a village in Rudkhaneh Bar Rural District, Rudkhaneh District, Rudan County, Hormozgan Province, Iran. At the 2006 census, its population was 18, in 4 families.
