= Tarbuyeh =

Tarbuyeh تربوييه
- Village
- Location within Iran
- Coordinates: 27°43′21″N 55°45′47″E
- Country: Iran
- Province: Hormozgan
- County: Bandar Abbas
- Bakhsh: Fin
- Rural District: Fin

Population (2006)
  - Total: 32
- Time zone: UTC+3:30 (IRST)
  - Summer (DST): UTC+4:30 (IRDT)

Tarbuyeh (Persian: تربوييه, also Romanized as Tarbūyeh, Tarbū”īyeh, and Terbū’īyeh) is a village in Fin Rural District, Fin District, Bandar Abbas County, Hormozgan Province, Iran. At the 2006 census, its population was 32, in 10 families.
