= Madanuiyeh =

Madanuiyeh معدنوئيه
- Village
- Location within Iran
- Coordinates: 28°15′19″N 55°48′00″E
- Country: Iran
- Province: Hormozgan
- County: Hajjiabad
- Bakhsh: Central
- Rural District: Tarom

Population (2006)
  - Total: 486
- Time zone: UTC+3:30 (IRST)
  - Summer (DST): UTC+4:30 (IRDT)

Madanuiyeh (Persian: معدنوئيه, also Romanized as Ma‘danū’īyeh, Ma‘danūyeh, and Ma’danoo’eyeh; also known as Madanu) is a village in Tarom Rural District, in the Central District of Hajjiabad County, Hormozgan Province, Iran. At the 2006 census, its population was 486, in 138 families.
