= Baverdan =

Baverdan باوردان
- Village
- Location within Iran
- Coordinates: 26°46′30″N 54°21′54″E
- Country: Iran
- Province: Hormozgan
- County: Bandar Lengeh
- Bakhsh: Shibkaveh
- Rural District: Bandar Charak

Population (2006)
  - Total: 140
- Time zone: UTC+3:30 (IRST)
  - Summer (DST): UTC+4:30 (IRDT)

Baverdan (Persian: باوردان, also Romanized as Bāverdān, Bāvardān, and Bavardan; also known as Bavirdūn) is a village in Bandar Charak Rural District, Shibkaveh District, Bandar Lengeh County, Hormozgan Province, Iran. At the 2006 census, its population was 140, in 20 families.
