= Bandak, Iran =

Bandak بندك
- Village
- Location within Iran
- Coordinates: 27°08′38″N 57°23′37″E
- Country: Iran
- Province: Hormozgan
- County: Minab
- Bakhsh: Tukahur
- Rural District: Tukahur

Population (2006)
  - Total: 319
- Time zone: UTC+3:30 (IRST)
  - Summer (DST): UTC+4:30 (IRDT)

Bandak (Persian: بندك) is a village in Tukahur Rural District, Tukahur District, Minab County, Hormozgan Province, Iran. At the 2006 census, its population was 319, in 68 families.
