= Bu Jebrail =

Bu Jebrail بوجبرائيل
- Village
- Location within Iran
- Coordinates: 26°55′31″N 53°33′02″E
- Country: Iran
- Province: Hormozgan
- County: Bandar Lengeh
- Bakhsh: Shibkaveh
- Rural District: Moqam

Population (2006)
  - Total: 239
- Time zone: UTC+3:30 (IRST)
  - Summer (DST): UTC+4:30 (IRDT)

Bu Jebrail (Persian: بوجبرائيل, also Romanized as Bū Jebrā’īl; also known as Boojabra’il) is a village in Moqam Rural District, Shibkaveh District, Bandar Lengeh County, Hormozgan Province, in southern Iran. At the 2006 census, its population was 239, in 38 families.
