= Qadehar =

Qadehar قادهار
- Village
- Location within Iran
- Coordinates: 27°22′41″N 56°22′54″E
- Country: Iran
- Province: Hormozgan
- County: Bandar Abbas
- Bakhsh: Qaleh Qazi
- Rural District: Sarkhun

Population (2006)
  - Total: 252
- Time zone: UTC+3:30 (IRST)
  - Summer (DST): UTC+4:30 (IRDT)

Qadehar (Persian: قادهار, also Romanized as Qādehār) is a village in Sarkhun Rural District, Qaleh Qazi District, Bandar Abbas County, Hormozgan Province, Iran. At the 2006 census, its population was 252, in 58 families.
