= Darshahr-e Gafr =

Darshahr-e Gafr درشهر گافر
- Village
- Location within Iran
- Coordinates: 26°19′41″N 58°16′23″E
- Country: Iran
- Province: Hormozgan
- County: Bashagard
- Bakhsh: Gafr and Parmon
- Rural District: Gafr and Parmon

Population (2006)
  - Total: 118
- Time zone: UTC+3:30 (IRST)
  - Summer (DST): UTC+4:30 (IRDT)

Darshahr-e Gafr (Persian: درشهر گافر, also Romanized as Darshahr-e Gāfr; also known as Darshahr) is a village in Gafr and Parmon Rural District, Gafr and Parmon District, Bashagard County, Hormozgan Province, Iran. At the 2006 census, its population was 118, in 30 families.
