= Barast =

Barast برست
- Village
- Country: Iran
- Province: Hormozgan
- County: Bandar Lengeh
- Bakhsh: Central
- Rural District: Howmeh

Population (2006)
  - Total: 132
- Time zone: UTC+3:30 (IRST)
  - Summer (DST): UTC+4:30 (IRDT)

Barast (Persian: برست) is a village in Howmeh Rural District, in the Central District of Bandar Lengeh County, Hormozgan province, Iran. At the 2006 census, its population was 132, in 29 families.
