= Kuneh =

Kuneh كونه
- Village
- Location within Iran
- Coordinates: 27°01′32″N 54°55′21″E
- Country: Iran
- Province: Hormozgan
- County: Bandar Lengeh
- Bakhsh: Central
- Rural District: Mehran

Population (2006)
  - Total: 346
- Time zone: UTC+3:30 (IRST)
  - Summer (DST): UTC+4:30 (IRDT)

Kuneh (Persian: كونه, also Romanized as Kūneh; also known as Kābeneh, Kāboneh, and Kānīyeh) is a village in Mehran Rural District, in the Central District of Bandar Lengeh County, Hormozgan Province, Iran. At the 2006 census, its population was 346, in 61 families.
