= Khersin =

Khersin خرسين
- Village
- Location within Iran
- Coordinates: 27°50′30″N 56°13′46″E
- Country: Iran
- Province: Hormozgan
- County: Bandar Abbas
- Bakhsh: Fin
- Rural District: Siyahu

Population (2006)
  - Total: 442
- Time zone: UTC+3:30 (IRST)
  - Summer (DST): UTC+4:30 (IRDT)

Khersin (Persian: خرسين, also Romanized as Khersīn) is a village in Siyahu Rural District, Fin District, Bandar Abbas County, Hormozgan Province, Iran. At the 2006 census, its population was 442, in 121 families.
