= Gowd Kaz =

Gowdegaz گودگز
- Village
- Location within Iran
- Coordinates: 27°18′12″N 54°30′33″E
- Country: Iran
- Province: Hormozgan
- County: Bastak
- Bakhsh: Central
- Rural District: Fatuyeh

Population (2006)
  - Total: 446
- Time zone: UTC+3:30 (IRST)
  - Summer (DST): UTC+4:30 (IRDT)

Gowdegaz (Persian: گودگزl also known as Gowd-e Gaz, Gowd Gaz, and GowdeGez) is a village in Fatuyeh Rural District, in the Central District of Bastak County, Hormozgan Province, Iran. At the 2006 census, its population was 446, in 98 families.
