= Do Gerdan Khunsorkh =

Do Gerdan Khunsorkh دوگردان خونسرخ
- Village
- Location within Iran
- Coordinates: 27°08′34″N 56°05′52″E
- Country: Iran
- Province: Hormozgan
- County: Bandar Abbas
- Bakhsh: Central
- Rural District: Gachin

Population (2006)
  - Total: 1,581
- Time zone: UTC+3:30 (IRST)
  - Summer (DST): UTC+4:30 (IRDT)

Do Gerdan Khunsorkh (Persian: دوگردان خونسرخ, also Romanized as Do Gerdān Khūnsorkh; also known as Do Gerdān, Dogerdān, and Dowgerdān) is a village in Gachin Rural District, in the Central District of Bandar Abbas County, Hormozgan Province, Iran. At the 2006 census, its population was 1,581, in 337 families.
