= Dalvaban-e Olya =

Dalvaban-e Olya دلوابان عليا
- Village
- Location within Iran
- Coordinates: 27°50′50″N 57°15′05″E
- Country: Iran
- Province: Hormozgan
- County: Rudan
- Bakhsh: Rudkhaneh
- Rural District: Rudkhaneh Bar

Population (2006)
  - Total: 252
- Time zone: UTC+3:30 (IRST)
  - Summer (DST): UTC+4:30 (IRDT)

Dalvaban-e Olya (Persian: دلوابان عليا, also Romanized as Dalvābān-e 'Olyā; also known as Dalvābān and Delqābān) is a village in Rudkhaneh Bar Rural District, Rudkhaneh District, Rudan County, Hormozgan province, Iran. At the 2006 census, its population was 252, in 47 families.
