= Solubalm =

Soloubalm سلوبلم
- Village
- Location within Iran
- Coordinates: 27°36′57″N 56°52′30″E
- Country: Iran
- Province: Hormozgan
- County: Bandar Abbas
- Bakhsh: shamil
- Rural District: Shamil

Population (2006)
  - Total: 145
- Time zone: UTC+3:30 (IRST)
  - Summer (DST): UTC+4:30 (IRDT)

Solubalm (Persian: سلوبلم, also Romanized as Solūbalm, Salū Balam, and Salūbalm; also known as Salūbam) is a village in Poshtkuh-e Shamil , پشتکوه شمیل Shamil Rural District, shamil District, Bandar Abbas County, Hormozgan Province, Iran. At the 2006 census, its population was 145, in 46 families.
