= Poshteh-ye Ziarat, Hormozgan =

Village in Hormozgan, Iran

Poshteh-ye Ziarat پشته زيارت
- Village
- Location within Iran
- Coordinates: 28°24′32″N 55°41′55″E
- Country: Iran
- Province: Hormozgan
- County: Hajjiabad
- Bakhsh: Central
- Rural District: Dar Agah

Population (2006)
  - Total: 88
- Time zone: UTC+3:30 (IRST)
  - Summer (DST): UTC+4:30 (IRDT)

Poshteh-ye Ziarat (Persian: پشته زيارت, also Romanized as Poshteh-ye Zīārat; also known as Posht-e Zeyārat) is a village in Dar Agah Rural District, in the Central District of Hajjiabad County, Hormozgan Province, Iran. At the 2006 census, its population was 88, in 23 families.
