= Sarkhur Tahruyi =

Sarkhur Tahruyi سرخورطاهرويي
- Village
- Location within Iran
- Coordinates: 26°33′24″N 57°05′38″E
- Country: Iran
- Province: Hormozgan
- County: Minab
- Bakhsh: Byaban
- Rural District: Sirik

Population (2006)
  - Total: 213
- Time zone: UTC+3:30 (IRST)
  - Summer (DST): UTC+4:30 (IRDT)

Sarkhur Tahruyi (Persian: سرخورطاهرويي, also Romanized as Sarkhūr Ţāhrūyī; also known as Sarkhor) is a village in Sirik Rural District, Byaban District, Minab County, Hormozgan Province, Iran. At the 2006 census, its population was 213, in 32 families.
