= Zaminan, Hormozgan =

Zaminan زمينان
- Village
- Location within Iran
- Coordinates: 27°42′27″N 57°15′01″E
- Country: Iran
- Province: Hormozgan
- County: Rudan
- Bakhsh: Rudkhaneh
- Rural District: Rudkhaneh

Population (2006)
  - Total: 198
- Time zone: UTC+3:30 (IRST)
  - Summer (DST): UTC+4:30 (IRDT)

Zaminan (Persian: زمينان, also Romanized as Zamīnān; also known as Zamīnū) is a village in Rudkhaneh Rural District, Rudkhaneh District, Rudan County, Hormozgan Province, Iran. At the 2006 census, its population was 198, in 43 families.
