= Zeynabi =

Zeynabi زينبي
- Village
- Location within Iran
- Coordinates: 26°53′04″N 55°57′31″E
- Country: Iran
- Province: Hormozgan
- County: Qeshm
- Bakhsh: Central
- Rural District: Ramkan

Population (2006)
  - Total: 1,207
- Time zone: UTC+3:30 (IRST)
  - Summer (DST): UTC+4:30 (IRDT)

Zeynabi (Persian: زينبي, also Romanized as Zeynabī; also known as Zainubi and Zeynūbī) is a village in Ramkan Rural District, in the Central District of Qeshm County, Hormozgan Province, Iran. At the 2006 census, its population was 1,207, in 277 families.
