= Tuman Rahi =

Tuman Rahi تومان راهي
- Village
- Location within Iran
- Coordinates: 26°28′22″N 57°09′21″E
- Country: Iran
- Province: Hormozgan
- County: Minab
- Bakhsh: Byaban
- Rural District: Sirik

Population (2006)
  - Total: 130
- Time zone: UTC+3:30 (IRST)
  - Summer (DST): UTC+4:30 (IRDT)

Tuman Rahi (Persian: تومان راهي, also Romanized as Tūmān Rāhī; also known as Tombān Rāhī and Tūmānzāhī) is a village in Sirik Rural District, Byaban District, Minab County, Hormozgan Province, Iran. At the 2006 census, its population was 130, in 22 families.
