= Kalmui =

Kalmui كلمويي
- Village
- Location within Iran
- Coordinates: 26°22′08″N 57°18′13″E
- Country: Iran
- Province: Hormozgan
- County: Minab
- Bakhsh: Byaban
- Rural District: Byaban

Population (2006)
  - Total: 253
- Time zone: UTC+3:30 (IRST)
  - Summer (DST): UTC+4:30 (IRDT)

Kalmui (Persian: كلمويي, also Romanized as Kalmū’ī) is a village in Byaban Rural District, Byaban District, Minab County, Hormozgan Province, Iran. At the 2006 census, its population was 253, in 37 families.
