= Bejgui =

Bejgui بجگوئي
- Village
- Location within Iran
- Coordinates: 27°13′21″N 57°24′01″E
- Country: Iran
- Province: Hormozgan
- County: Rudan
- Bakhsh: Jaghin
- Rural District: Jaghin-e Shomali

Population (2006)
  - Total: 992
- Time zone: UTC+3:30 (IRST)
  - Summer (DST): UTC+4:30 (IRDT)

Bejgui (Persian: بجگوئي, also Romanized as Bejgū'ī) is a village in Jaghin-e Shomali Rural District, Jaghin District, Rudan County, Hormozgan Province, Iran. At the 2006 census, its population was 992, in 207 families.
