= Todruyeh =

Todruyeh تدروئيه
- Village
- Location within Iran
- Coordinates: 27°18′09″N 54°42′34″E
- Country: Iran
- Province: Hormozgan
- County: Bastak
- Bakhsh: Central
- Rural District: Godeh

Population (2006)
  - Total: 1,998
- Time zone: UTC+3:30 (IRST)
  - Summer (DST): UTC+4:30 (IRDT)

Todruyeh (Persian: تدروئيه, also Romanized as Todrūyeh, Tadrooyeh, and Tadrūyeh; also known as Tūdarān, Tudaru, Tudirān, and Tūdorān) is a village in Godeh Rural District, in the Central District of Bastak County, Hormozgan Province, Iran. At the 2006 census, its population was 1,998, in 386 families.
