= Espangun =

Espangun اسپنگون
- Village
- Location within Iran
- Coordinates: 27°09′13″N 56°57′50″E
- Country: Iran
- Province: Hormozgan
- County: Minab
- Bakhsh: Central
- Rural District: Tiab

Population (2006)
  - Total: 110
- Time zone: UTC+3:30 (IRST)
  - Summer (DST): UTC+4:30 (IRDT)

Espangun (Persian: اسپنگون, also Romanized as Espangūn; also known as Espangān and Espengān) is a village in Tiab Rural District, in the Central District of Minab County, Hormozgan Province, Iran. At the 2006 census, its population was 110, in 27 families.
