= Kam Jamal =

Kam Jamal كم جمال
- Village
- Location within Iran
- Coordinates: 27°12′04″N 57°22′24″E
- Country: Iran
- Province: Hormozgan
- County: Rudan
- Bakhsh: Jaghin
- Rural District: Jaghin-e Jonubi

Population (2006)
  - Total: 286
- Time zone: UTC+3:30 (IRST)
  - Summer (DST): UTC+4:30 (IRDT)

Kam Jamal (Persian: كم جمال, also Romanized as Kam Jamāl) is a village in Jaghin-e Jonubi Rural District, Jaghin District, Rudan County, Hormozgan Province, Iran. At the 2006 census, its population was 286, in 57 families.
