= Khvorlul =

Khvorlul خورلول
- Village
- Location within Iran
- Coordinates: 27°18′59″N 56°17′15″E
- Country: Iran
- Province: Hormozgan
- County: Bandar Abbas
- Bakhsh: Central
- Rural District: Isin

Population (2006)
  - Total: 509
- Time zone: UTC+3:30 (IRST)
  - Summer (DST): UTC+4:30 (IRDT)

Khvorlul (Persian: خورلول, also Romanized as Khvorlūl) is a village in Isin Rural District, in the Central District of Bandar Abbas County, Hormozgan Province, Iran. At the 2006 census, its population was 509, in 104 families.
