= Owdui =

Owdui اودوئي
- Village
- Location within Iran
- Coordinates: 27°01′09″N 57°24′10″E
- Country: Iran
- Province: Hormozgan
- County: Minab
- Bakhsh: Senderk
- Rural District: Bondar

Population (2006)
  - Total: 335
- Time zone: UTC+3:30 (IRST)
  - Summer (DST): UTC+4:30 (IRDT)

Owdui (Persian: اودوئي, also Romanized as Owdūī and Owdoee) is a village in Bondar Rural District, Senderk District, Minab County, Hormozgan Province, Iran. At the 2006 census, its population was 335, in 65 families.
