= Gursar =

Gursar گورسر
- Village
- Location within Iran
- Coordinates: 26°03′10″N 58°53′30″E
- Country: Iran
- Province: Hormozgan
- County: Jask
- Bakhsh: Lirdaf
- Rural District: Surak

Population (2006)
  - Total: 87
- Time zone: UTC+3:30 (IRST)
  - Summer (DST): UTC+4:30 (IRDT)

Gursar (Persian: گورسر, also Romanized as Gūrsar) is a village in Surak Rural District, Lirdaf District, Jask County, Hormozgan Province, Iran. At the 2006 census, its population was 87, in 23 families.
