= Kafchal =

Coordinates: 27.1480°N 54.8344°E

Kafchal كفچال
- Village
- Interactive map of Kafchal
- Country: Iran
- Province: Hormozgan
- County: Bastak
- Bakhsh: Central
- Rural District: Deh Tall

Population (2006)
  - Total: 34
- Time zone: UTC+3:30 (IRST)
  - Summer (DST): UTC+4:30 (IRDT)

Kafchal (Persian: كفچال, also Romanized as Kafchāl) is a village in Deh Tall Rural District, in the Central District of Bastak County, Hormozgan Province, Iran. At the 2006 census, its population was 34, in 6 families.
