= Dasht-e Emam, Hormozgan =

Dasht-e Emam دشت امام
- Village
- Location within Iran
- Coordinates: 27°26′54″N 56°19′36″E
- Country: Iran
- Province: Hormozgan
- County: Bandar Abbas
- Bakhsh: Central
- Rural District: Isin

Population (2006)
  - Total: 620
- Time zone: UTC+3:30 (IRST)
  - Summer (DST): UTC+4:30 (IRDT)

Dasht-e Emam (Persian: دشت امام, also Romanized as Dasht-e Emām) is a village in Isin Rural District, in the Central District of Bandar Abbas County, Hormozgan Province, Iran. At the 2006 census, its population was 620, in 140 families.
