= Zigadaf =

Zigadaf زيگدف
- Village
- Location within Iran
- Coordinates: 25°41′29″N 58°45′05″E
- Country: Iran
- Province: Hormozgan
- County: Jask
- Bakhsh: Lirdaf
- Rural District: Surak

Population (2006)
  - Total: 608
- Time zone: UTC+3:30 (IRST)
  - Summer (DST): UTC+4:30 (IRDT)

Zigadaf (Persian: زيگدف, also Romanized as Zīgadaf; also known as Zīdekīdaf and Zītgadaf) is a village in Surak Rural District, Lirdaf District, Jask County, Hormozgan Province, Iran. At the 2006 census, its population was 608, in 136 families.
