= Makian, Iran =

Makian ماكيان
- Village
- Location within Iran
- Coordinates: 27°11′10″N 57°01′48″E
- Country: Iran
- Province: Hormozgan
- County: Minab
- Bakhsh: Central
- Rural District: Howmeh

Population (2006)
  - Total: 171
- Time zone: UTC+3:30 (IRST)
  - Summer (DST): UTC+4:30 (IRDT)

Makian (Persian: ماكيان, also Romanized as Mākīān; also known as Māhkīān) is a village in Howmeh Rural District, in the Central District of Minab County, Hormozgan Province, Iran. At the 2006 census, its population was 171, in 40 families.
