= Demilu =

Demilu دميلو
- Village
- Location within Iran
- Coordinates: 27°10′51″N 55°49′49″E
- Country: Iran
- Province: Hormozgan
- County: Bandar Abbas
- Bakhsh: Central
- Rural District: Gachin

Population (2006)
  - Total: 1,229
- Time zone: UTC+3:30 (IRST)
  - Summer (DST): UTC+4:30 (IRDT)

Demilu (Persian: دميلو, also Romanized as Demīlū, Damiloo, and Domīlū) is a village in Gachin Rural District, in the Central District of Bandar Abbas County, Hormozgan Province, Iran. At the 2006 census, its population was 1,229, in 276 families.
