= Kombil =

Kombil كمبيل
- Village
- Location within Iran
- Coordinates: 27°01′12″N 56°59′57″E
- Country: Iran
- Province: Hormozgan
- County: Minab
- Bakhsh: Central
- Rural District: Band-e Zarak

Population (2006)
  - Total: 318
- Time zone: UTC+3:30 (IRST)
  - Summer (DST): UTC+4:30 (IRDT)

Kombil (Persian: كمبيل, also Romanized as Kombīl; also known as Komīl (Persian: كميل) and Kūmbīl) is a village in Band-e Zarak Rural District, in the Central District of Minab County, Hormozgan Province, Iran. At the 2006 census, its population was 318, in 59 families.
