= Kamsi Savar =

Kamsi Savar كم سي سوار
- Village
- Location within Iran
- Coordinates: 27°30′39″N 57°03′19″E
- Country: Iran
- Province: Hormozgan
- County: Rudan
- Bakhsh: Central
- Rural District: Rahdar

Population (2006)
  - Total: 34
- Time zone: UTC+3:30 (IRST)
  - Summer (DST): UTC+4:30 (IRDT)

Kamsi Savar (Persian: كم سي سوار, also Romanized as Kamsī Savār) is a village in Rahdar Rural District, in the Central District of Rudan County, Hormozgan Province, Iran. At the 2006 census, its population was 34, in 7 families.
