= Pasangar =

Pasangar پاسنگر
- Village
- Location within Iran
- Coordinates: 27°04′41″N 57°20′15″E
- Country: Iran
- Province: Hormozgan
- County: Minab
- Bakhsh: Tukahur
- Rural District: Tukahur

Population (2006)
  - Total: 18
- Time zone: UTC+3:30 (IRST)
  - Summer (DST): UTC+4:30 (IRDT)

Pasangar (Persian: پاسنگر, also Romanized as Pāsangar and Pā-ye Sangar; also known as Pāy-e Sangar) is a village in Tukahur Rural District, Tukahur District, Minab County, Hormozgan Province, Iran. At the 2006 census, its population was 18, in 4 families.
