= Leshtani =

Leshtani لشتاني
- Village
- Location within Iran
- Coordinates: 26°55′06″N 53°51′49″E
- Country: Iran
- Province: Hormozgan
- County: Bandar Lengeh
- Bakhsh: Shibkaveh
- Rural District: Moqam

Population (2006)
  - Total: 20
- Time zone: UTC+3:30 (IRST)
  - Summer (DST): UTC+4:30 (IRDT)

Leshtani (Persian: لشتاني, also Romanized as Leshtānī; also known as Lash Dānī) is a village in Moqam Rural District, Shibkaveh District, Bandar Lengeh County, Hormozgan Province, Iran. At the 2006 census, its population was 20, in 4 families.
