= Godar Gardyal =

Godar Gardyal گدار گرديال
- Village
- Location within Iran
- Coordinates: 27°42′13″N 57°07′24″E
- Country: Iran
- Province: Hormozgan
- County: Rudan
- Bakhsh: Rudkhaneh
- Rural District: Mosaferabad

Population (2006)
  - Total: 15
- Time zone: UTC+3:30 (IRST)
  - Summer (DST): UTC+4:30 (IRDT)

Godar Gardyal (Persian: گدار گرديال, also Romanized as Godār Gārdyāl) is a village in Mosaferabad Rural District, Rudkhaneh District, Rudan County, Hormozgan Province, Iran. At the 2006 census, its population was 15, in 4 families.
