= Reza Alichi =

Reza Alichi رضاعليچي
- Village
- Location within Iran
- Coordinates: 27°07′40″N 57°03′10″E
- Country: Iran
- Province: Hormozgan
- County: Minab
- Bakhsh: Central
- Rural District: Band-e Zarak

Population (2006)
  - Total: 306
- Time zone: UTC+3:30 (IRST)
  - Summer (DST): UTC+4:30 (IRDT)

Reza Alichi (Persian: رضاعليچي, also Romanized as Reẕā ‘Alīchī) is a village in Band-e Zarak Rural District, in the Central District of Minab County, Hormozgan Province, Iran. At the 2006 census, its population was 306, in 69 families.
