= Kalgharabad =

Kalgharabad كلغراباد
- Village
- Location within Iran
- Coordinates: 27°47′17″N 57°07′54″E
- Country: Iran
- Province: Hormozgan
- County: Rudan
- Bakhsh: Rudkhaneh
- Rural District: Mosaferabad

Population (2006)
  - Total: 83
- Time zone: UTC+3:30 (IRST)
  - Summer (DST): UTC+4:30 (IRDT)

Kalgharabad (Persian: كلغراباد, also Romanized as Kalgharābād; also known as Kalqarābād) is a village in Mosaferabad Rural District, Rudkhaneh District, Rudan County, Hormozgan Province, Iran. At the 2006 census, its population was 83, in 20 families.
