= Katuheng =

Katuheng كتوهنگ
- Village
- Location within Iran
- Coordinates: 26°42′40″N 57°52′00″E
- Country: Iran
- Province: Hormozgan
- County: Bashagard
- Bakhsh: Gowharan
- Rural District: Gowharan

Population (2006)
  - Total: 41
- Time zone: UTC+3:30 (IRST)
  - Summer (DST): UTC+4:30 (IRDT)

Katuheng (Persian: كتوهنگ, also Romanized as Katūheng; also known as Katūhīng) is a village in Gowharan Rural District, Gowharan District, Bashagard County, Hormozgan Province, Iran. At the 2006 census, its population was 41, in 12 families.
