= Aghushkdal =

Aghushkdal اغوشك دل
- Village
- Location within Iran
- Coordinates: 26°04′44″N 57°21′14″E
- Country: Iran
- Province: Hormozgan
- County: Jask
- Bakhsh: Central
- Rural District: Kangan

Population (2006)
  - Total: 245
- Time zone: UTC+3:30 (IRST)
  - Summer (DST): UTC+4:30 (IRDT)

Aghushkdal (Persian: اغوشك دل, also Romanized as Āghūshkdal; also known as Āgoshg and Āgoshk) is a village in Kangan Rural District, in the Central District of Jask County, Hormozgan Province, Iran. At the 2006 census, its population was 245, in 39 families.
