= Keshmigi =

Keshmigi كش ميگي
- Village
- Location within Iran
- Coordinates: 26°20′46″N 57°37′45″E
- Country: Iran
- Province: Hormozgan
- County: Bashagard
- Bakhsh: Central
- Rural District: Jakdan

Population (2006)
  - Total: 121
- Time zone: UTC+3:30 (IRST)
  - Summer (DST): UTC+4:30 (IRDT)

Keshmigi (Persian: كش ميگي, also Romanized as Keshmīgī) is a village in Jakdan Rural District, in the Central District of Bashagard County, Hormozgan Province, Iran. At the 2006 census, its population was 121, in 31 families.
