= Kormun, Hormozgan =

Cormun کرمون
- Village
- Location within Iran
- Coordinates: 27°26′16″N 56°52′09″E
- Country: Iran
- Province: Hormozgan
- County: Bandar Abbas
- Bakhsh: Shamil District
- Rural District: Hasanlangi Rural District

Population (2006)
  - Total: 342
- Time zone: UTC+3:30 (IRST)
  - Summer (DST): UTC+4:30 (IRDT)

Kormun or Kormon (Persian: کرمون, also Romanized as Kormūn; also known as Kūrmūn) is a village in Hasanlangi Rural District, Shamil District, Bandar Abbas County, Hormozgan Province, Iran. At the 2006 census, its population was 342, in 72 families.
