= Tang Gach =

Tang Gach تنگگچ
- Village
- Location within Iran
- Coordinates: 27°25′52″N 55°17′50″E
- Country: Iran
- Province: Hormozgan
- County: Khamir
- Bakhsh: Ruydar
- Rural District: Ruydar

Population (2006)
  - Total: 120
- Time zone: UTC+3:30 (IRST)
  - Summer (DST): UTC+4:30 (IRDT)

Tang Gach (Persian: تنگگچ) is a village in Ruydar Rural District, Ruydar District, Khamir County, Hormozgan Province, Iran. At the 2006 census, its population was 120, in 30 families.
