= Salakh =

Salakh سلخ
- Village
- Location within Iran
- Coordinates: 26°41′24″N 55°42′25″E
- Country: Iran
- Province: Hormozgan
- County: Qeshm
- Bakhsh: Shahab
- Rural District: Salakh

Population (2006)
  - Total: 2,281
- Time zone: UTC+3:30 (IRST)
  - Summer (DST): UTC+4:30 (IRDT)

Salakh (Persian: سلخ, also Romanized as Şalakh; also known as Şalagh, Şelagh, and Selaq) is a village in Salakh Rural District, Shahab District, Qeshm County, Hormozgan Province, Iran. At the 2006 census, its population was 2,281, in 420 families.
