= Gombaran =

Gombaran گمبران
- Village
- Location within Iran
- Coordinates: 26°43′18″N 55°37′07″E
- Country: Iran
- Province: Hormozgan
- County: Qeshm
- Bakhsh: Shahab
- Rural District: Salakh

Population (2006)
  - Total: 436
- Time zone: UTC+3:30 (IRST)
  - Summer (DST): UTC+4:30 (IRDT)

Gombaran (Persian: گمبران, also Romanized as Gombarān; also known as Gomerān) is a village in Salakh Rural District, Shahab District, Qeshm County, Hormozgan Province, Iran. At the 2006 census, its population was 436, in 88 families.
