= Nasirai =

Nasirai نصيرائي
- Village
- Location within Iran
- Coordinates: 27°07′29″N 57°01′39″E
- Country: Iran
- Province: Hormozgan
- County: Minab
- Bakhsh: Central
- Rural District: Howmeh

Population (2006)
  - Total: 1,355
- Time zone: UTC+3:30 (IRST)
  - Summer (DST): UTC+4:30 (IRDT)

Nasirai (Persian: نصيرائي, also Romanized as Naşīrā’ī and Nasīrā’ī) is a village in Howmeh Rural District, in the Central District of Minab County, Hormozgan Province, Iran. At the 2006 census, its population was 1,355, in 270 families.
