= Qaleh-ye Komiz =

Qaleh-ye Komiz قلعه كميز
- Village
- Location within Iran
- Coordinates: 27°21′56″N 57°13′53″E
- Country: Iran
- Province: Hormozgan
- County: Rudan
- Bakhsh: Central
- Rural District: Abnama

Population (2006)
  - Total: 3,049
- Time zone: UTC+3:30 (IRST)
  - Summer (DST): UTC+4:30 (IRDT)

Qaleh-ye Komiz (Persian: قلعه كميز, also Romanized as Qal‘eh-ye Komīz) is a village in Abnama Rural District, in the Central District of Rudan County, Hormozgan Province, Iran. At the 2006 census, its population was 3,049, in 625 families.
