= Gashun =

Coordinates: 27.1480°N 54.8344°E

Gashun گشون
- Village
- Interactive map of Gashun
- Country: Iran
- Province: Hormozgan
- County: Bastak
- Bakhsh: Central
- Rural District: Godeh

Population (2006)
  - Total: 76
- Time zone: UTC+3:30 (IRST)
  - Summer (DST): UTC+4:30 (IRDT)

Gashun (Persian: گشون, also Romanized as Gashūn) is a village in Godeh Rural District, in the Central District of Bastak County, Hormozgan Province, Iran. At the 2006 census, its population was 76, in 15 families.
