= Halavan =

Halavan هلائون
- Village
- Location within Iran
- Coordinates: 27°03′08″N 57°19′48″E
- Country: Iran
- Province: Hormozgan
- County: Minab
- Bakhsh: Central
- Rural District: Karian

Population (2006)
  - Total: 54
- Time zone: UTC+3:30 (IRST)
  - Summer (DST): UTC+4:30 (IRDT)

Halavan (Persian: هلائون, also Romanized as Halāvan; also known as Halāvān-e Sarney) is a village in Karian Rural District, in the Central District of Minab County, Hormozgan Province, Iran. At the 2006 census, its population was 54, in 8 families.
