= Biglarabad =

Biglarabad بيگلراباد
- Village
- Location within Iran
- Coordinates: 27°18′35″N 54°38′23″E
- Country: Iran
- Province: Hormozgan
- County: Bastak
- Bakhsh: Central
- Rural District: Godeh

Population (2006)
  - Total: 83
- Time zone: UTC+3:30 (IRST)
  - Summer (DST): UTC+4:30 (IRDT)

Biglarabad (Persian: بيگلراباد, also Romanized as Bīglarābād; also known as Beglarābād) is a village in Godeh Rural District, in the Central District of Bastak County, Hormozgan Province, Iran. At the 2006 census, its population was 83, in 18 families.
