= Bunuk =

Bunuk بونوك
- Village
- Country: Iran
- Province: Hormozgan
- County: Jask
- Bakhsh: Lirdaf
- Rural District: Surak

Population (2006)
  - Total: 16
- Time zone: UTC+3:30 (IRST)
  - Summer (DST): UTC+4:30 (IRDT)

Bunuk (Persian: بونوك, also Romanized as Būnūk) is a village located in Surak Rural District, within Lirdaf District, Jask County, in the Hormozgan Province of Iran. According to the 2006 census, the village had a population of 16, residing in 4 families.
