= Gahru, Hormozgan =

Gahru گهرو
- Village
- Interactive map of Gahru
- Coordinates: 26°52′26″N 57°12′49″E
- Country: Iran
- Province: Hormozgan
- County: Minab
- Bakhsh: Central
- Rural District: Karian

Population (2006)
  - Total: 443
- Time zone: UTC+3:30 (IRST)
  - Summer (DST): UTC+4:30 (IRDT)

Gahru (Persian: گهرو, also Romanized as Gahrū) is a village in Karian Rural District, in the Central District of Minab County, Hormozgan Province, Iran. At the 2006 census, its population was 443, in 84 families.
