= Bey Kahnu =

Bey Kahnu بيكهنو
- Village
- Location within Iran
- Coordinates: 26°44′09″N 58°01′16″E
- Country: Iran
- Province: Hormozgan
- County: Bashagard
- Bakhsh: Gowharan
- Rural District: Gowharan

Population (2006)
  - Total: 352
- Time zone: UTC+3:30 (IRST)
  - Summer (DST): UTC+4:30 (IRDT)

Bey Kahnu (Persian: بيكهنو, also Romanized as Bey Kahnū; also known as Beyn Kahnū, Bīkhkahnūch, and Pīr Kahnū) is a village in Gowharan Rural District, Gowharan District, Bashagard County, Hormozgan Province, Iran. At the 2006 census, its population was 352, in 81 families.
