= Kuh-e Heydar =

Kuh-e Heydar كوه حيدر
- Village
- Location within Iran
- Coordinates: 26°25′02″N 57°29′58″E
- Country: Iran
- Province: Hormozgan
- County: Bashagard
- Bakhsh: Central
- Rural District: Jakdan

Population (2006)
  - Total: 646
- Time zone: UTC+3:30 (IRST)
  - Summer (DST): UTC+4:30 (IRDT)

Kuh-e Heydar (Persian: كوه حيدر, also Romanized as Kūh-e Ḩeydar) is a village in Jakdan Rural District, in the Central District of Bashagard County, Hormozgan Province, Iran. At the 2006 census, its population was 646, in 111 families.
