= Shah Babak =

Shah Babak شه بابك
- Village
- Location within Iran
- Coordinates: 26°28′40″N 57°46′47″E
- Country: Iran
- Province: Hormozgan
- County: Bashagard
- Bakhsh: Central
- Rural District: Jakdan

Population (2006)
  - Total: 448
- Time zone: UTC+3:30 (IRST)
  - Summer (DST): UTC+4:30 (IRDT)

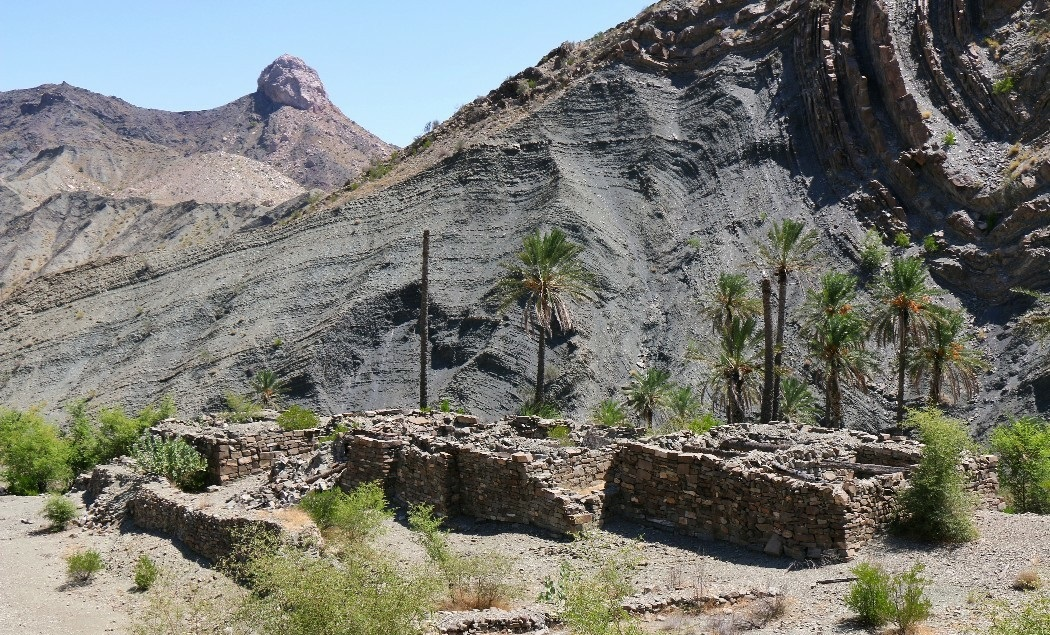
Shah Babak Nature

Shah Babak (Persian: شه بابك, also Romanized as Shah Bābak and Shāh Bābak; also known as Shāh Bāvegh) is a village in Jakdan Rural District, in the Central District of Bashagard County, Hormozgan Province, Iran. At the 2006 census, its population was 448, in 114 families.
