= Keshaharan =

Keshaharan كشهران
- Village
- Interactive map of Keshaharan
- Country: Iran
- Province: Hormozgan
- County: Minab
- Bakhsh: Senderk
- Rural District: Senderk

Population (2006)
  - Total: 96
- Time zone: UTC+3:30 (IRST)
  - Summer (DST): UTC+4:30 (IRDT)

Keshaharan (Persian: كشهران, also Romanized as Keshaharān) is a village in Senderk Rural District, Senderk District, Minab County, Hormozgan Province, Iran. At the 2006 census, its population was 96, in 27 families.
