= Bohregh-e Bala =

Bohregh-e Bala بهرغ بالا
- Village
- Country: Iran
- Province: Hormozgan
- County: Bandar Abbas
- Bakhsh: Takht
- Rural District: Takht

Population (2006)
  - Total: 257
- Time zone: UTC+3:30 (IRST)
  - Summer (DST): UTC+4:30 (IRDT)

Bohregh-e Bala (Persian: بهرغ بالا, also Romanized as Bohregh-e Bālā; also known as Sarg Dār) is a village in Takht Rural District, Takht District, Bandar Abbas County, Hormozgan Province, Iran. At the 2006 census, its population was 257, in 54 families.
