= Divan, Iran =

Divan ديوان
- Village
- Location within Iran
- Coordinates: 26°34′52″N 54°35′05″E
- Country: Iran
- Province: Hormozgan
- County: Bandar Lengeh
- Bakhsh: Central
- Rural District: Moghuyeh

Population (2006)
  - Total: 1,931
- Time zone: UTC+3:30 (IRST)
  - Summer (DST): UTC+4:30 (IRDT)

Divan (Persian: ديوان, also Romanized as Dīvān; also known as Bandar-e Dīvān, Bandar-e Rīvān, Duwwān, and Ruvvān) is a village in the Moghuyeh Rural District, in the Central District of Bandar Lengeh County, Hormozgan Province, Iran. At the 2006 census, its population was 1,931, in 310 families.
