= Gerdekan-e Ahmadi =

Gerdekan-e Ahmadi گردكان احمدي
- Village
- Location within Iran
- Coordinates: 27°49′47″N 56°45′28″E
- Country: Iran
- Province: Hormozgan
- County: Hajjiabad
- Bakhsh: Ahmadi
- Rural District: Ahmadi

Population (2006)
  - Total: 51
- Time zone: UTC+3:30 (IRST)
  - Summer (DST): UTC+4:30 (IRDT)

Gerdekan-e Ahmadi (Persian: گردكان احمدي, also Romanized as Gerdekān-e Aḩmadī and Gardekān-e Aḩmadī; also known as Gardekān) is a village in Ahmadi Rural District, Ahmadi District, Hajjiabad County, Hormozgan Province, Iran. At the 2006 census, its population was 51, in 13 families.
