= Shahrak-e Tavanir =

Shahrak-e Tavanir شهرك توانير
- Village
- Country: Iran
- Province: Hormozgan
- County: Bandar Abbas
- Bakhsh: Central
- Rural District: Gachin

Population (2006)
  - Total: 1,701
- Time zone: UTC+3:30 (IRST)
  - Summer (DST): UTC+4:30 (IRDT)

Shahrak-e Tavanir (Persian: شهرك توانير, also Romanized as Shahrak-e Tavānīr) is a village in Gachin Rural District, in the Central District of Bandar Abbas County, Hormozgan Province, Iran. At the 2006 census, it had a population of 1,701 people (372 families).
