= Qasem-e Jelali =

Qasem-e Jelali قاسم جلالي
- Village
- Country: Iran
- Province: Hormozgan
- County: Minab
- Bakhsh: Central
- Rural District: Howmeh

Population (2006)
  - Total: 831
- Time zone: UTC+3:30 (IRST)
  - Summer (DST): UTC+4:30 (IRDT)

Qasem-e Jelali (Persian: قاسم جلالي, also Romanized as Qāsem-e Jelālī) is a village in Howmeh Rural District, in the Central District of Minab County, Hormozgan Province, Iran. At the 2006 census, its population was 831, in 166 families.
