= Parnimeh =

Parnimeh پرنيمه
- Village
- Interactive map of Parnimeh
- Country: Iran
- Province: Hormozgan
- County: Khamir
- Bakhsh: Ruydar
- Rural District: Rudbar

Population (2006)
  - Total: 121
- Time zone: UTC+3:30 (IRST)
  - Summer (DST): UTC+4:30 (IRDT)

Parnimeh (Persian: پرنيمه, also Romanized as Parnīmeh) is a village in Rudbar Rural District, Ruydar District, Khamir County, Hormozgan Province, Iran. At the 2006 census, its population was 121, in 23 families.
