= Piskan =

Piskan پيس كن
- Village
- Location within Iran
- Coordinates: 26°21′12″N 57°46′32″E
- Country: Iran
- Province: Hormozgan
- County: Bashagard
- Bakhsh: Central
- Rural District: Jakdan

Population (2006)
  - Total: 47
- Time zone: UTC+3:30 (IRST)
  - Summer (DST): UTC+4:30 (IRDT)

Piskan (Persian: پيس كن, also Romanized as Pīskan) is a village in Jakdan Rural District, in the Central District of Bashagard County, Hormozgan Province, Iran. At the 2006 census, its population was 47, in 11 families.
