= Abshurak =

Abshurak ابشورك
- Village
- Location within Iran
- Coordinates: 27°16′40″N 56°22′38″E
- Country: Iran
- Province: Hormozgan
- County: Bandar Abbas
- Bakhsh: Central
- Rural District: Isin

Population (2006)
  - Total: 2,056
- Time zone: UTC+3:30 (IRST)
  - Summer (DST): UTC+4:30 (IRDT)

Abshurak (Persian: ابشورك, also Romanized as Ābshūrak and Āb Shūrk; also known as Ābsūreh) is a village in Isin Rural District, in the Central District of Bandar Abbas County, Hormozgan Province, Iran. At the 2006 census, its population was 2,056, in 451 families.
