= Kahurtak =

Kahurtak كهورتاك
- Village
- Location within Iran
- Coordinates: 27°10′17″N 57°27′37″E
- Country: Iran
- Province: Hormozgan
- County: Minab
- Bakhsh: Tukahur
- Rural District: Cheraghabad

Population (2006)
  - Total: 435
- Time zone: UTC+3:30 (IRST)
  - Summer (DST): UTC+4:30 (IRDT)

Kahurtak (Persian: كهورتاك, also Romanized as Kahūrtak) is a village in Cheraghabad Rural District, Tukahur District, Minab County, Hormozgan Province, Iran. At the 2006 census, its population was 435, in 91 families.
