= Shurayi =

Shurayi شورائي
- Village
- Location within Iran
- Coordinates: 27°37′07″N 57°06′32″E
- Country: Iran
- Province: Hormozgan
- County: Rudan
- Bakhsh: Central
- Rural District: Rahdar

Population (2006)
  - Total: 138
- Time zone: UTC+3:30 (IRST)
  - Summer (DST): UTC+4:30 (IRDT)

Shurayi (Persian: شورائي, also Romanized as Shūrāyī; also known as Shūrānī) is a village in Rahdar Rural District, in the Central District of Rudan County, Hormozgan Province, Iran. At the 2006 census, its population was 138, in 33 families.
