= Qaleh-ye Isin =

Qaleh-ye Isin قلعه ايسين
- Village
- Country: Iran
- Province: Hormozgan
- County: Bandar Abbas
- Bakhsh: Central
- Rural District: Isin

Population (2006)
  - Total: 721
- Time zone: UTC+3:30 (IRST)
  - Summer (DST): UTC+4:30 (IRDT)

Qaleh-ye Isin (Persian: قلعه ايسين, also Romanized as Qal‘eh-ye Īsīn) is a village in Isin Rural District, in the Central District of Bandar Abbas County, Hormozgan Province, Iran. At the 2006 census, its population was 721, in 164 families.
