= Dardunganj =

Dardunganj دردونگنج
- Village
- Country: Iran
- Province: Hormozgan
- County: Bashagard
- Bakhsh: Gowharan
- Rural District: Gowharan

Population (2006)
  - Total: 57
- Time zone: UTC+3:30 (IRST)
  - Summer (DST): UTC+4:30 (IRDT)

Dardunganj (Persian: دردونگنج, also Romanized as Dardūnganj) is a village in Gowharan Rural District, Gowharan District, Bashagard County, Hormozgan Province, Iran. At the 2006 census, its population was 57, in 16 families.
