= Jom Anbeh =

Jom Anbeh جم انبه
- Village
- Location within Iran
- Coordinates: 27°13′00″N 57°22′31″E
- Country: Iran
- Province: Hormozgan
- County: Rudan
- Bakhsh: Jaghin
- Rural District: Jaghin-e Shomali

Population (2006)
  - Total: 1,349
- Time zone: UTC+3:30 (IRST)
  - Summer (DST): UTC+4:30 (IRDT)

Jom Anbeh (Persian: جم انبه, also Romanized as Jom Ānbeh; also known as Jomambā) is a village in Jaghin-e Shomali Rural District, Jaghin District, Rudan County, Hormozgan Province, Iran. At the 2006 census, its population was 1,349, in 268 families.
