= Karatan =

Karatan كرتان
- Village
- Location within Iran
- Coordinates: 26°17′27″N 57°09′57″E
- Country: Iran
- Province: Hormozgan
- Country: Minab
- Bakhsh: Byaban
- Rural District: Byaban

Population (2006)
  - Total: 440
- Time zone: UTC+3:30 (IRST)
  - Summer (DST): UTC+4:30 (IRDT)

Karatan (Persian: كرتان, also Romanized as Karatān) is a village in Byaban Rural District, Byaban District, Minab County, Hormozgan Province, Iran. At the 2006 census, its population was 440, in 69 families.
