= Yord =

Yord (Persian: يرد) may refer to:

- Yord-e Anjir
- Yord-e Basravi
- Yord-e Jamal
- Yord-e Khalaf
- Yord-e Khordu
- Yord-e Qasemali

== See also ==
- Yurd (disambiguation)
