= Charnier =

Charnier is a French surname, and a French word for charnel house.

Charnier or variation, may also refer to:

== People ==
- Claude Charnier, Canadian musician and member of Headscan
- Daniel Charnier, a Huguenot; see List of Huguenots
- Madeleine Charnier (1919—2002), a French zoologist

=== Fictional characters ===
- Alain Charnier, a fictional character from the film The French Connection (film)

== Other uses ==
- The Charnel House (French: Le Charnier), a Picasso painting that he painted while living in France
- Les Charniers (Occitan: Li Cadarau), an 1884 work by Valère Bernard published in French and Occitan

== See also ==
- Pointe Rochers Charniers, Cottian Alps, France; a mountain
- Charnel House (disambiguation)
- Tomb (disambiguation)
- Crypt (disambiguation)
- Catacomb (disambiguation)
