= Konardan =

Konardan or Kenardan (Persian: كناردان) may refer to:

- Konardan, Firuzabad, Fars Province
- Konardan, Jahrom, Fars Province
- Konardan, Larestan, Fars Province
- Konardan, Hormozgan
- Konardan, Parsian, Hormozgan Province
- Konardan-e Sharqi, Hormozgan Province
- Konardan, Saravan, Sistan and Baluchestan Province
- Konardan, Nik Shahr, Sistan and Baluchestan Province
