= Milaki, Hormozgan =

Milaki ميلكي
- Village
- Location within Iran
- Coordinates: 27°14′28″N 53°00′18″E
- Country: Iran
- Province: Hormozgan
- County: Parsian
- Bakhsh: Kushk-e Nar
- Rural District: Behdasht

Population (2006)
  - Total: 564
- Time zone: UTC+3:30 (IRST)
  - Summer (DST): UTC+4:30 (IRDT)

Milaki (Persian: ميلكي, also Romanized as Mīlakī, Meylakī, and Mīlekī; also known as Māliki) is a village in Behdasht Rural District, Kushk-e Nar District, Parsian County, Hormozgan Province, Iran. At the 2006 census, its population was 564, in 135 families.
