= Bambari, Iran =

Bambari بمبري
- Village
- Location within Iran
- Coordinates: 27°12′01″N 53°01′26″E
- Country: Iran
- Province: Hormozgan
- County: Parsian
- Bakhsh: Kushk-e Nar
- Rural District: Behdasht

Population (2006)
  - Total: 346
- Time zone: UTC+3:30 (IRST)
  - Summer (DST): UTC+4:30 (IRDT)

Bambari (Persian: بمبري, also Romanized as Bambarī) is a village in Behdasht Rural District, Kushk-e Nar District, Parsian County, Hormozgan Province, Iran. At the 2006 census, its population was 346, in 72 families.
