= Setolu =

Village in Hormozgan province, Iran

Setolu Persian: ستلو
- Village
- Location within Iran
- Coordinates: 27°11′31″N 52°58′08″E
- Country: Iran
- Province: Hormozgan
- County: Parsian
- District: Kushk-e Nar
- Rural District: Behdasht

Population (2016)
  - Total: 1,639
- Time zone: UTC+3:30 (IRST)

Setolu (Persian: ستلو) (Note: Also romanized as Satloo, Satlū, Setolū, and Sotolū; also known as Seh Tolū and Setowlū) is a village in Behdasht Rural District of Kushk-e Nar District, Parsian County, (Note: Formerly Gavbandi County) Hormozgan province, Iran.

== Demographics ==
=== Population ===
At the time of the 2006 National Census, the village's population was 1,376 in 271 households, when it was in Kushk-e Nar Rural District. The following census in 2011 counted 1,482 people in 373 households, by which time it had been transferred to Behdasht Rural District. The 2016 census measured the population of the village as 1,639 people in 471 households. It was the most populous village in its rural district.
