= Tombu =

Tombu (Persian: تمبو) may refer to:

- Tombu-e Bala ("Upper Tombu"), Minab County, Hormozgan Province, Iran
- Tombu-e Pain ("Lower Tombu"), Minab County, Hormozgan Province, Iran
- Tombu Jonubi ("South Tombu"), Parsian County, Hormozgan Province, Iran
- Tombu Shomali ("North Tombu"), Parsian County, Hormozgan Province, Iran

== See also ==
- Tomb, Iran (disambiguation)
