= Ahmadi, Hormozgan =

Ahmadi احمدي
- Village
- Location within Iran
- Coordinates: 27°03′08″N 53°32′03″E
- Country: Iran
- Province: Hormozgan
- County: Parsian
- Bakhsh: Central
- Rural District: Buchir

Population (2006)
  - Total: 142
- Time zone: UTC+3:30 (IRST)
  - Summer (DST): UTC+4:30 (IRDT)

Ahmadi (Persian: احمدي, also Romanized as Aḩmadī) is a village in Buchir Rural District, in the Central District of Parsian County, Hormozgan Province, Iran. At the 2006 census, its population was 142, in 33 families.
