= Farsi, Iran =

Farsi فارسی
- Village
- Location within Iran
- Coordinates: 27°16′49″N 52°45′52″E
- Country: Iran
- Province: Tehran
- County: Parsian
- Bakhsh: Kushk-e Nar
- اRural District: Kushk-e Nar

Population (2006)
  - Total: 211
- Time zone: UTC+3:30 (IRST)
  - Summer (DST): UTC+4:30 (IRDT)

Farsi (Persian: فارسی, also Romanized as Fārsī and Fāresī) is a village in Kushk-e Nar Rural District, Kushk-e Nar District, Parsian County, Hormozgan Province, Iran. At the 2006 census, its population was 211, in 42 families.
