= Heshniz =

Heshniz هشنيز
- Village
- Location within Iran
- Coordinates: 27°04′52″N 53°32′01″E
- Country: Iran
- Province: Hormozgan
- County: Parsian
- Bakhsh: Central
- Rural District: Buchir

Population (2006)
  - Total: 670
- Time zone: UTC+3:30 (IRST)
  - Summer (DST): UTC+4:30 (IRDT)

Heshniz (Persian: هشنيز, also Romanized as Heshnīz and Hashnīz; also known as Eshnīz, Hashinaz, and Heshīnaz) is a village in Buchir Rural District, in the Central District of Parsian County, Hormozgan Province, Iran. At the 2006 census, its population was 670, in 149 families.
