= Fumestan =

Fumestan فومستان
- Village
- Location within Iran
- Coordinates: 27°13′55″N 53°02′02″E
- Country: Iran
- Province: Hormozgan
- County: Parsian
- Bakhsh: Kushk-e Nar
- Rural District: Behdasht

Population (2006)
  - Total: 835
- Time zone: UTC+3:30 (IRST)
  - Summer (DST): UTC+4:30 (IRDT)

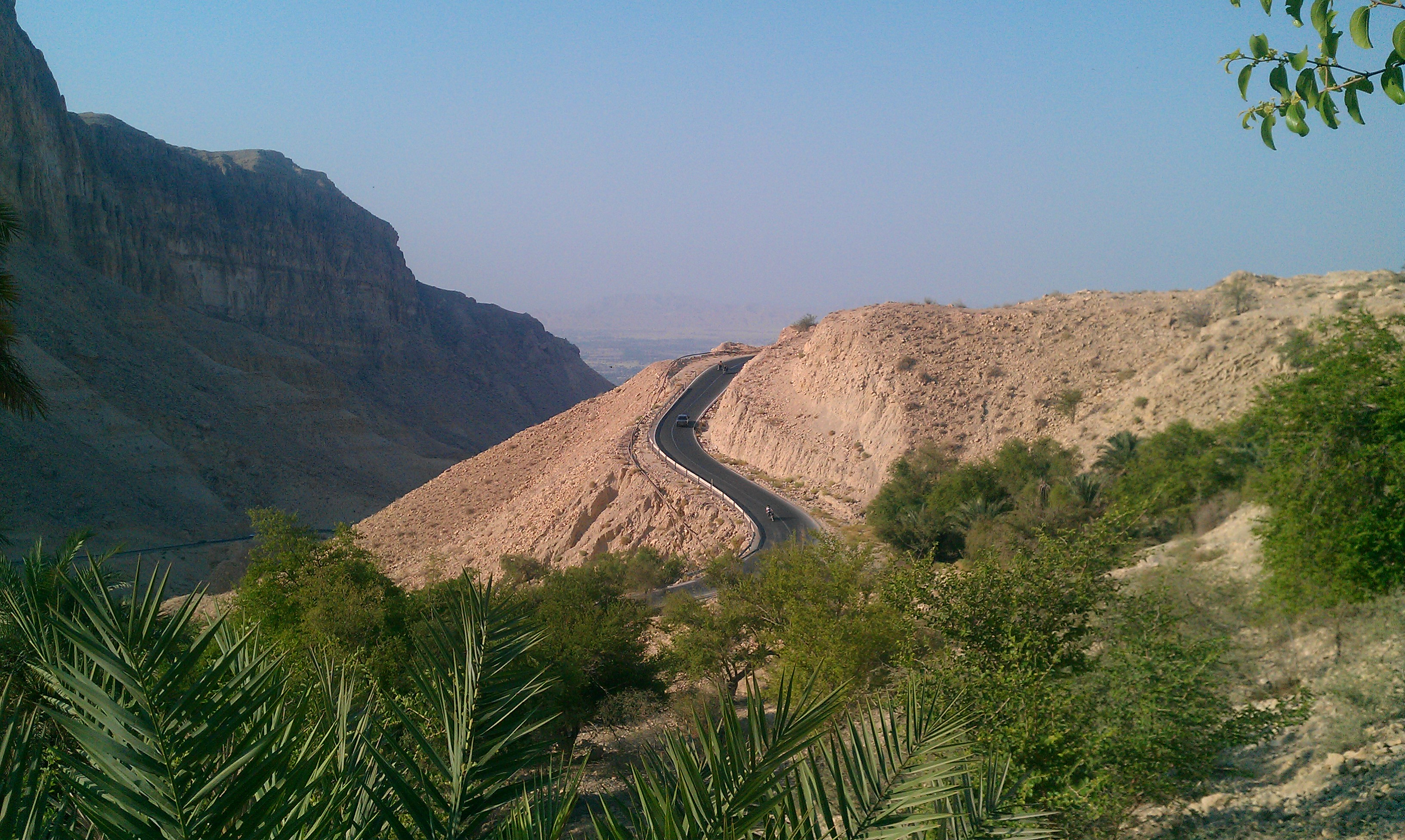
Fumestan (2018)

Fumestan (Persian: فومستان, also Romanized as Fūmestān and Foomestan) is a village in Behdasht Rural District, Kushk-e Nar District, Parsian County, Hormozgan Province, Iran. At the 2006 census, its population was 835, in 193 families.
