= Yord-e kukherdi =

Coordinates: 27.0867°N 54.4906°E

Yord-e kukherdi یُرد کوخردی
- Village
- Interactive map of Yord-e kukherdi
- Country: Iran
- Province: Hormozgan
- County: Parsian
- Bakhsh: Kushk-e Nar

Population (2006)
  - Total: 259
- Time zone: UTC+3:30 (IRST)
  - Summer (DST): UTC+4:30 (IRDT)

Yord-e kukherdi (Persian: یرد کوخردی, also Romanized as Yord-e Kookherdi) is a village in Behdasht Rural District, Kushk-e Nar District, Parsian County, Hormozgan Province, Iran. At the 2006 census, its population was 259, in 27 families.
