= Rostamabad, Parsian =

Rostamabad رستم اباد
- Village
- Location within Iran
- Coordinates: 27°13′56″N 53°01′11″E
- Country: Iran
- Province: Hormozgan
- County: Parsian
- Bakhsh: Kushk-e Nar
- Rural District: Behdasht

Population (2006)
  - Total: 146
- Time zone: UTC+3:30 (IRST)
  - Summer (DST): UTC+4:30 (IRDT)

Rostamabad (Persian: رستم اباد, also Romanized as Rostamābād) is a village in Behdasht Rural District, Kushk-e Nar District, Parsian County, Hormozgan Province, Iran. At the 2006 census, its population was 146, in 34 families.
