= Khuzu =

Khuzu خوضو
- Village
- Country: Iran
- Province: Hormozgan
- County: Parsian
- Bakhsh: Kushk-e Nar
- Rural District: Behdasht

Population (2006)
  - Total: 96
- Time zone: UTC+3:30 (IRST)
  - Summer (DST): UTC+4:30 (IRDT)

Khuzu (Persian: خوضو, also Romanized as Khūz̤ū) is a village in Behdasht Rural District, Kushk-e Nar District, Parsian County, Hormozgan Province, Iran. At the 2006 census, its population was 96, in 20 families.
