= Akbari, Hormozgan =

Akbari اكبري
- Village
- Location within Iran
- Coordinates: 27°17′05″N 52°49′36″E
- Country: Iran
- Province: Hormozgan
- County: Parsian
- Bakhsh: Kushk-e Nar
- Rural District: Kushk-e Nar

Population (2021)
  - Total: 350
- Time zone: UTC+3:30 (IRST)
  - Summer (DST): UTC+4:30 (IRDT)

Akbari (Persian: اكبري, also Romanized as Akbarī) is a village in Kushk-e Nar Rural District, Kushk-e Nar District, Parsian County, Hormozgan Province, Iran. At the 2006 census, its population was 172, in 24 families.
