= Garmsiri language =

Southwestern Iranian language

Garmsiri
- Bandari
- گرمسیری، بندری، هرمزگانی
- Native to: Iran
- Region: Hormozgan, Kerman
- Ethnicity: Bandari Persians, including some Bashkardis
- Language family: Indo-European: Indo-Iranian; Iranian; Western Iranian; Southwestern; Bashkardi; Garmsiri

Language codes
- ISO 639-3: None (mis)
- Glottolog: garm1243
- IETF: bsg-u-sd-ir22

Garmsiri or Bandari is a Persian and Southwestern Iranian language spoken in the southeast of Iran in Hormozgan and Kerman. It consists of closely related dialects extending from the Halilrud river valley in the north down to the Strait of Hormuz in the south. The language is closely related to Bashkardi, Larestani and Kumzari. It forms a transitional dialect group to northwestern Iranian Balochi, due to intense areal contact.

== Varieties ==
Garmsiri varieties and locations include:

- Marzi Gal (Northern Bashkardi)
- Korta
- Hormozgan Pahlavani (Pahlavani)
- Rudbari-ye Kerman (Rudbari, Halilrud)
- Jirofti and Kahnuji
- Rukhonei (Rudkhanei)
- Rudoni (Rudani)
- Minowi group: covering Minowi (Minabi), Hormuzi (Hormozi), Banzarki, Shahrichi (Shahri)
- Glangli (Galangi)
- Bandar Abbās group: Ashomi, Fini, Surui (Suru'i), Bandari of Bandar Abbas, Khamiri, Kongi, Chahvazi
- Keshmi (Qeshmi, Qishmi, Jazirati "Islander")

Kahnuji and Jirofti are close, but Jirofti has been influenced by Kermani Persian, which is replacing it.

Pahlavani is spoken by an ethnically Indo-Aryan (Koli) people. Its vocabulary is somewhat different, some reportedly modified through reversals of syllables and the like. 'Pahlavani' is the endonym.

Rudani has many words and grammatical structures from Southern Balochi. Grammatically, Korta is similar to other varieties of Bandari, but its vocabulary is closer to that of Balochi. It is now moribund.
