= Homeyran, Parsian =

Homeyran حميران
- Village
- Location within Iran
- Coordinates: 27°02′20″N 53°41′45″E
- Country: Iran
- Province: Hormozgan
- County: Parsian
- Bakhsh: Central
- Rural District: Buchir

Population (2006)
  - Total: 814
- Time zone: UTC+3:30 (IRST)
  - Summer (DST): UTC+4:30 (IRDT)

Homeyran (Persian: حميران, also Romanized as Ḩomeyrān; also known as ’ameyrān, ’amīrān, ’amīrān-e Gāvbandī, Hamiran Gavbandi, Hamīru, and ’omeyrān) is a village in Buchir Rural District, in the Central District of Parsian County, Hormozgan Province, Iran. At the 2006 census, its population was 814, in 169 families.
