= Surobash =

Surobash سورباش
- Village
- Location within Iran
- Coordinates: 27°16′10″N 52°50′12″E
- Country: Iran
- Province: Hormozgan
- County: Parsian
- Bakhsh: Kushk-e Nar
- Rural District: Kushk-e Nar

Population (2006)
  - Total: 525
- Time zone: UTC+3:30 (IRST)
  - Summer (DST): UTC+4:30 (IRDT)

Surobash (Persian: سورباش, also Romanized as Sūrobāsh; also known as Sarv, Sarvbāsh, Sorūbāsh, and Surubāsh) is a village in Kushk-e Nar Rural District, Kushk-e Nar District, Parsian County, Hormozgan Province, Iran. At the 2006 census, its population was 525, in 101 families.
