= Behdeh =

Village in Hormozgan province, Iran

Behdeh Persian: بهده
- Village
- Location within Iran
- Coordinates: 27°06′27″N 53°22′03″E
- Country: Iran
- Province: Hormozgan
- County: Parsian
- District: Central
- Rural District: Mehregan

Population (2016)
  - Total: 1,923
- Time zone: UTC+3:30 (IRST)

Behdeh (Persian: بهده) is a village in, and the capital of, Mehregan Rural District of the Central District of Parsian County, (Note: Formerly Gavbandi County) Hormozgan province, Iran.

== Demographics ==
=== Population ===
At the time of the 2006 National Census, the village's population was 1,436 in 313 households. The following census in 2011 counted 1,550 people in 395 households. The 2016 census measured the population of the village as 1,923 people in 521 households. It was the most populous village in its rural district.
