= Yord-e Basravi =

Yord-e Basravi يرد بصراوئ
- Village
- Location within Iran
- Coordinates: 27°11′18″N 53°02′08″E
- Country: Iran
- Province: Hormozgan
- County: Parsian
- Bakhsh: Kushk-e Nar
- Rural District: Behdasht

Population (2006)
  - Total: 39
- Time zone: UTC+3:30 (IRST)
  - Summer (DST): UTC+4:30 (IRDT)

Yord-e Basravi (Persian: يرد بصراوئ, also Romanized as Yord-e Baṣrāvi) is a village in Behdasht Rural District, Kushk-e Nar District, Parsian County, Hormozgan Province, Iran. At the 2006 census, its population was 39, in 10 families.
