= Yord-e Khalaf =

Yord-e Khalaf يردخلف
- Village
- Location within Iran
- Coordinates: 27°11′00″N 53°02′48″E
- Country: Iran
- Province: Hormozgan
- County: Parsian
- Bakhsh: Kushk-e Nar
- Rural District: Behdasht

Population (2006)
  - Total: 694
- Time zone: UTC+3:30 (IRST)
  - Summer (DST): UTC+4:30 (IRDT)

Yord-e Khalaf (Persian: يردخلف; also known as Yūrd-e Khalaf) is a village in Behdasht Rural District, Kushk-e Nar District, Parsian County, Hormozgan Province, Iran. At the 2006 census, its population was 694, in 128 families.
