= Yord-e Qasemali =

Yord-e Qasemali يردقاسم عالي
- Village
- Location within Iran
- Coordinates: 27°11′32″N 53°03′28″E
- Country: Iran
- Province: Hormozgan
- County: Parsian
- Bakhsh: Kushk-e Nar
- Rural District: Behdasht

Population (2006)
  - Total: 1,468
- Time zone: UTC+3:30 (IRST)
  - Summer (DST): UTC+4:30 (IRDT)

Yord-e Qasemali (Persian: يردقاسم عالي, also Romanized as Yord-e Qāsem‘ālī; also known as Yūrd) is a village in Behdasht Rural District, Kushk-e Nar District, Parsian County, Hormozgan Province, Iran. The 2006 census reported its population at 1,468, with 323 families.
