= Amani, Hormozgan =

Village in Hormozgan province, Iran

Amani Persian: عماني
- Village
- Location within Iran
- Coordinates: 27°15′22″N 52°57′53″E
- Country: Iran
- Province: Hormozgan
- County: Parsian
- District: Kushk-e Nar
- Rural District: Kushk-e Nar

Population (2016)
  - Total: 1,153
- Time zone: UTC+3:30 (IRST)

Amani (Persian: عماني) (Note: Also romanized as ‘Amānī and ‘Ommānī) is a village in Kushk-e Nar Rural District of Kushk-e Nar District, Parsian County, (Note: Formerly Gavbandi County) Hormozgan province, Iran.

== Demographics ==
=== Population ===
At the time of the 2006 National Census, the village's population was 913 in 164 households. The following census in 2011 counted 1,092 people in 229 households. The 2016 census measured the population of the village as 1,153 people in 288 households. It was the most populous village in its rural district.
