= Bandar-e Shiu =

Bandar-e Shiu بندرشيو
- Village
- Location within Iran
- Coordinates: 27°04′49″N 53°08′37″E
- Country: Iran
- Province: Hormozgan
- County: Parsian
- Bakhsh: Kushk-e Nar
- Rural District: Behdasht

Population (2006)
  - Total: 488
- Time zone: UTC+3:30 (IRST)
  - Summer (DST): UTC+4:30 (IRDT)

Bandar-e Shiu (Persian: بندرشيو, also Romanized as Bandar-e Shīū’; also known as Sheyow, Sheyū, Shīū, and Shīvūh) is a village in Behdasht Rural District, Kushk-e Nar District, Parsian County, Hormozgan Province, Iran. At the 2006 census, its population was 488, in 102 families.
