= Chek Chek =

Chekchek or Chek Chek (Persian: چك چك) may refer to the following places in Iran:

- Chekchek, Fars
- Chek Chek, Mohr, Fars Province
- Chekchek, Hormozgan
- Chek Chek-e Shomali, Hormozgan Province
- Chek Chek, Kerman
- Chek Chek, Yazd
