= Ziarat, Parsian =

Village in Hormozgan province, Iran

Ziarat Persian: زيارت
- Village
- Location within Iran
- Coordinates: 27°05′49″N 53°04′41″E
- Country: Iran
- Province: Hormozgan
- County: Parsian
- District: Anbaran
- Rural District: Behdasht

Population (2016)
  - Total: 930
- Time zone: UTC+3:30 (IRST)

Ziarat (Persian: زيارت) (Note: Also romanized as Zeyārat, Zīārat, Ziyārat, and Ziyaret; also known as Bandar-e Zīyārat) is a village in, and the capital of, Behdasht Rural District of Kushk-e Nar District, Parsian County, (Note: Formerly Gavbandi County) Hormozgan province, Iran. The previous capital of the rural district was the village of Dashti, now a city.

== Demographics ==
=== Population ===
At the time of the 2006 National Census, the village's population was 866 in 184 households. The following census in 2011 counted 912 people in 209 households. The 2016 census measured the population of the village as 930 people in 259 households.
