= Charnel House =

A charnel house is a facility for storing human remains in skeleton form.

Charnel House, or variations, may also refer to:

- The Charnel House, a painting by Pablo Picasso
- The Charnel House (film), a 2016 U.S. dark fantasy horror film
- Charnel House (publisher), a U.S. horror fiction publisher
- Charnel House, a poetic graphic novel with art by Tom de Freston
- The Charnel House, a novel by Eamonn McGrath

== See also ==
- House (disambiguation)
- Tomb (disambiguation)
- Crypt (disambiguation)
- Catacomb (disambiguation)
