= Moghdan, Parsian =

Moghdan مغدان
- Village
- Location within Iran
- Coordinates: 27°04′30″N 53°10′02″E
- Country: Iran
- Province: Hormozgan
- County: Parsian
- Bakhsh: Kushk-e Nar
- Rural District: Behdasht

Population (2006)
  - Total: 553
- Time zone: UTC+3:30 (IRST)
  - Summer (DST): UTC+4:30 (IRDT)

Moghdan (Persian: مغدان, also Romanized as Moghdān; also known as Mofdān, Moqdān, and Mughdun) is a village in Behdasht Rural District, Kushk-e Nar District, Parsian County, Hormozgan Province, Iran. At the 2006 census, its population was 553, in 101 families.
