= Chek Chek-e Shomali =

Chek Chek-e Shomali چكچكشمالي
- Village
- Location within Iran
- Coordinates: 27°07′57″N 53°16′01″E
- Country: Iran
- Province: Hormozgan
- County: Parsian
- Bakhsh: Central
- Rural District: Mehregan

Population (2006)
  - Total: 48
- Time zone: UTC+3:30 (IRST)
  - Summer (DST): UTC+4:30 (IRDT)

Chek Chek-e Shomali (Persian: چكچكشمالي, also Romanized as Chek Chek-e Shomālī; also known as Chak Chak and Chek Chek) is a village in Mehregan Rural District, in the Central District of Parsian County, Hormozgan Province, Iran. At the 2006 census, its population was 48, in 11 families.
