= Gowd-e Konardan =

Gowd-e Konardan گودكناردان
- Village
- Location within Iran
- Coordinates: 27°08′11″N 53°18′05″E
- Country: Iran
- Province: Hormozgan
- County: Parsian
- Bakhsh: Central
- Rural District: Mehregan

Population (2006)
  - Total: 54
- Time zone: UTC+3:30 (IRST)
  - Summer (DST): UTC+4:30 (IRDT)

Gowd-e Konardan (Persian: گودكناردان, also Romanized as Gowd-e Konārdān, Gowd-e Kenārdān, and Gowd Kenar Dan; also known as Kenardan, Konārdān, Kunardūn, and Kūnerdān) is a village in Mehregan Rural District, in the Central District of Parsian County, Hormozgan Province, Iran. At the 2006 census, its population was 54, in 14 families.
