= Yord-e Khordu =

Yord-e Khordu يردخردو
- Village
- Location within Iran
- Coordinates: 27°10′51″N 53°02′10″E
- Country: Iran
- Province: Hormozgan
- County: Parsian
- Bakhsh: Kushk-e Nar
- Rural District: Behdasht

Population (2006)
  - Total: 201
- Time zone: UTC+3:30 (IRST)
  - Summer (DST): UTC+4:30 (IRDT)

Yord-e Khordu (Persian: يردخردو, also Romanized as Yord-e Khordū) is a village in Behdasht Rural District, Kushk-e Nar District, Parsian County, Hormozgan Province, Iran. At the 2006 census, its population was 201, in 45 families.
