= Konardan-e Sharqi =

Konardan-e Sharqi كناردان شرقي
- Village
- Location within Iran
- Coordinates: 27°08′14″N 53°19′14″E
- Country: Iran
- Province: Hormozgan
- County: Parsian
- Bakhsh: Central
- Rural District: Mehregan

Population (2006)
  - Total: 184
- Time zone: UTC+3:30 (IRST)
  - Summer (DST): UTC+4:30 (IRDT)

Konardan-e Sharqi (Persian: كناردان شرقي, also Romanized as Konārdān-e Sharqī; also known as Konārdān-e Shomalī) is a village in Mehregan Rural District, in the Central District of Parsian County, Hormozgan Province, Iran. At the 2006 census, its population was 184, in 42 families.
