= Buchir =

Village in Hormozgan province, Iran

Buchir Persian: بوچير
- Village
- Location within Iran
- Coordinates: 27°03′48″N 53°37′05″E
- Country: Iran
- Province: Hormozgan
- County: Parsian
- District: Central
- Rural District: Buchir

Population (2016)
  - Total: 3,382
- Time zone: UTC+3:30 (IRST)

Buchir (Persian: بوچير) (Note: Also romanized as Boochir and Būchīr; also known as Būshīr) is a village in, and the capital of, Buchir Rural District of the Central District of Parsian County, (Note: Formerly Gavbandi County) Hormozgan province, Iran.

== Demographics ==
=== Population ===
At the time of the 2006 National Census, the village's population was 2,775 in 645 households. The following census in 2011 counted 3,209 people in 792 households. The 2016 census measured the population of the village as 3,382 people in 929 households. It was the most populous village in its rural district.
