= Tombu Shomali =

Tombu Shomali تنبوشمالي
- Village
- Location within Iran
- Coordinates: 27°18′05″N 52°48′26″E
- Country: Iran
- Province: Hormozgan
- County: Parsian
- Bakhsh: Kushk-e Nar
- Rural District: Kushk-e Nar

Population (2006)
  - Total: 222
- Time zone: UTC+3:30 (IRST)
  - Summer (DST): UTC+4:30 (IRDT)

Tombu Shomali (Persian: تنبوشمالي, also Romanized as Tombū Shomālī and Tombū Shemālī) is a village in Kushk-e Nar Rural District, Kushk-e Nar District, Parsian County, Hormozgan Province, Iran. At the 2006 census, its population was 222, in 38 families.
