= Chehvaz =

Chehvaz چهواز
- Village
- Location within Iran
- Coordinates: 27°05′24″N 53°24′56″E
- Country: Iran
- Province: Hormozgan
- County: Parsian
- Bakhsh: Central
- Rural District: Mehregan

Population (2006)
  - Total: 572
- Time zone: UTC+3:30 (IRST)
  - Summer (DST): UTC+4:30 (IRDT)

Chehvaz (Persian: چهواز, also Romanized as Chehvāz and Chahvāz; also known as Chahvāv, Chehū, and Jahvāz) is a village in Mehregan Rural District, in the Central District of Parsian County, Hormozgan Province, Iran. At the 2006 census, its population was 572, in 143 families.
