= Bostanu =

Bostanu or Bustanu or Bestanoo (Persian: بستانو) may refer to:

- Bostanu, Bushehr
- Bostanu, Hormozgan
- Bostanu, Bandar Lengeh, Hormozgan Province
- Bostanu, Parsian, Hormozgan Province
