= Tomb, Iran =

Tomb, Iran may refer to:

- Tomb-e Bongeru
- Tomb-e Gowhar
- Tomb-e Sat

== See also ==
- Tomb (disambiguation)
- Tombu (disambiguation)
