= Bandar-e Bostanu =

Bandar-e Bostanu بندربستانو
- Village
- Location within Iran
- Coordinates: 27°07′14″N 53°01′48″E
- Country: Iran
- Province: Hormozgan
- County: Parsian
- Bakhsh: Kushk-e Nar
- Rural District: Behdasht

Population (2006)
  - Total: 642
- Time zone: UTC+3:30 (IRST)
  - Summer (DST): UTC+4:30 (IRDT)

Bandar-e Bostanu (Persian: بندربستانو, also Romanized as Bandar-e Bostānū; also known as Bastaneh, Bostāneh, Bostānū, Bustani, Būstānu, and Postānū) is a village in Behdasht Rural District, Kushk-e Nar District, Parsian County, Hormozgan Province, Iran. At the 2006 census, its population was 642, in 119 families.
