= Dashti, Hormozgan =

City in Hormozgan province, Iran

Dashti Persian: دشتي
- City
- Location within Iran
- Coordinates: 27°10′50″N 53°00′09″E
- Country: Iran
- Province: Hormozgan
- County: Parsian
- District: Central

Population (2016)
  - Total: 4,695
- Time zone: UTC+3:30 (IRST)

Dashti (Persian: دشتي) (Note: Also romanized as Dashtī) is a city in the Central District of Parsian County, (Note: Formerly Gavbandi County) Hormozgan province, Iran. As a village, it was the capital of Behdasht Rural District until its capital was transferred to the village of Ziarat.

== Demographics ==
=== Population ===
At the time of the 2006 National Census, Dashti's population was 3,947 in 848 households, when it was a village in Behdasht Rural District of Kushk-e Nar District. The following census in 2011 counted 4,258 people in 986 households, by which time the village had been transferred to Mehregan Rural District of the Central District. The 2016 census measured the population as 4,695 people in 1,207 households, when the village had been elevated to the status of a city.
