= Tonbu =

Tonbu (Persian: تنبو) may refer to:

- Tonbu-e Bala
- Tonbu-e Payin
