= Maghdan =

Maghdan or Moghdan (Persian: مغدان) may refer to:

- Moghdan, Bushehr
- Maghdan, Bastak, Hormozgan Province
- Moghdan, Parsian, Hormozgan Province
