= Shiu, Iran =

Shiu (Persian: شيو) in Iran may refer to:

- Shiu, Gilan
- Shiu, Hormozgan
