= Bostaneh =

Bostaneh or Bastaneh (Persian: بستانه) may refer to:

- Bostaneh, Fars
- Bostaneh, Hormozgan
- Bostaneh, Parsian, Hormozgan Provionce
