= Bashkardi language =

Iranian language spoken in southeast Iran

Bashkardi
- Southern Bashkardi
- ئواچۮڵۀ چۯڠکۆمۊ
- Native to: Iran
- Ethnicity: Bashkardi
- Native speakers: (7,000 all Bashkardi cited 2000)
- Language family: Indo-European: Indo-Iranian; Iranian; Western Iranian; Southwestern; Bashkardi

Language codes
- ISO 639-3: bsg (for all Bashkardi)
- Glottolog: bash1263 Bashkardi
- ELP: Bashkardi

Southern Bashkardi or Bashagerdi, or simply "Bashkardi", and also known as southern "Bashaka", is a Southwestern Iranian language spoken in the southeast of Iran in the provinces of Kerman, Sistan and Baluchestan, and Hormozgan. The language is closely related to Garmsiri, Larestani and Kumzari. It forms a transitional dialect group to northwestern Iranian Balochi, due to intense areal contact.

Northern Bashkardi, or Marzi Gāl, is closer to neighbours than is Southern Bashkardi, or Molki Gāl, and has been classified as a dialect of the neighboring Garmsiri (a.k.a. Bandari) language.

The Bashkardi varieties spoken further inland may not all fall into either Northern or Southern Bashkardi.
