= Yurd =

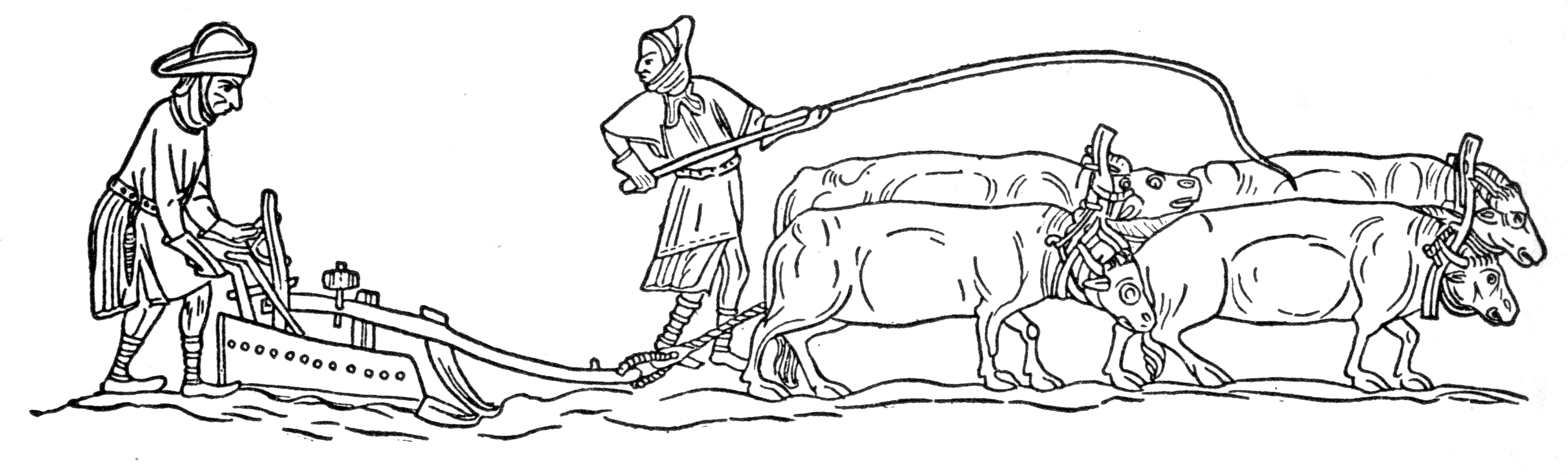

Yurd or Yowrd may refer to: A beast of burden from the Middle Ages

== See also ==
- Yord (disambiguation)
- Yurt
