= The Tombs (disambiguation) =

The Tombs is a detention complex in Manhattan, New York.

The Tombs may also refer to:

- The Tombs (film), a 1991 Argentine drama directed by Javier Torre
- The Tombs (novel), by Clive Cussler and Thomas Perry, 2012
- The Tombs (restaurant and bar), in the Georgetown neighborhood of Washington, D.C.

== See also ==
- The Tomb (disambiguation)
- Tomb (disambiguation)
