= Suru, Hormozgan =

Suru سورو
- Village
- Location within Iran
- Coordinates: 26°46′16″N 54°31′02″E
- Country: Iran
- Province: Hormozgan
- County: Bandar Lengeh
- Bakhsh: Central
- Rural District: Moghuyeh

Population (2006)
  - Total: 321
- Time zone: UTC+3:30 (IRST)
  - Summer (DST): UTC+4:30 (IRDT)

Suru (Persian: سورو, also Romanized as Sūrū; also known as Shūru and Soroo) is a village in Moghuyeh Rural District, in the Central District of Bandar Lengeh County, Hormozgan Province, Iran. At the 2006 census, its population was 321, in 60 families.
