= Konardan, Hormozgan =

Konardan كناردان
- Village
- Location within Iran
- Coordinates: 26°36′29″N 57°05′16″E
- Country: Iran
- Province: Hormozgan
- County: Minab
- Bakhsh: Byaban
- Rural District: Sirik

Population (2006)
  - Total: 532
- Time zone: UTC+3:30 (IRST)
  - Summer (DST): UTC+4:30 (IRDT)

Konardan (Persian: كناردان, also Romanized as Konārdān) is a village in Sirik Rural District, Byaban District, Minab County, Hormozgan Province, Iran. At the 2006 census, its population was 532, in 92 families.
