= Tomb-e Sat =

Tomb-e Sat تمب ساط
- Village
- Location within Iran
- Coordinates: 27°06′33″N 57°00′31″E
- Country: Iran
- Province: Hormozgan
- County: Minab
- Bakhsh: Central
- Rural District: Howmeh

Population (2006)
  - Total: 180
- Time zone: UTC+3:30 (IRST)
  - Summer (DST): UTC+4:30 (IRDT)

Tomb-e Sat (Persian: تمب ساط, also Romanized as Tomb-e Sāṭ; also known as Tomb Basāt, Tonb Basāt, and Towm-e Basāt) is a village in Howmeh Rural District, in the Central District of Minab County, Hormozgan Province, Iran. At the 2006 census, its population was 180, in 32 families.
