= Bashkardi people =

Iranian ethnic group in southern Iran

The Bashkardi people are an Iranian ethnic group that speak the Bashkardi language in southeastern Iran. The Bashkardi people practice Islam and have an approximate population from 8,700 to 35,000.

== Geographical distribution ==
The Bashkardi people primarily live in villages in the mountains near Bashagard County in Hormozgan Province. Ilya Gershevitch, expert on Iran, published "Travels in Bashkardia" in the Journal of the Royal Central Asian Society in 1959.

== Gallery ==
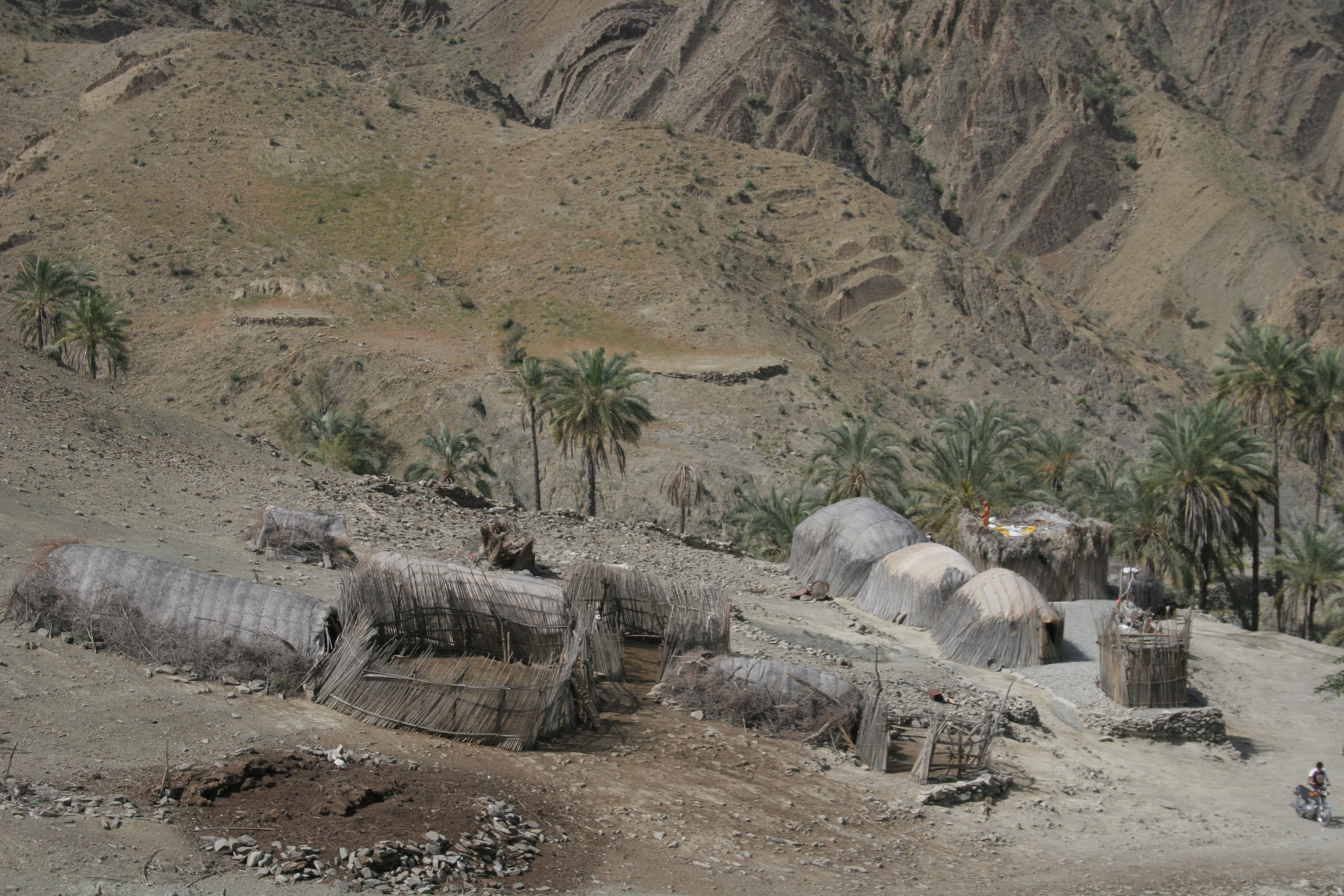

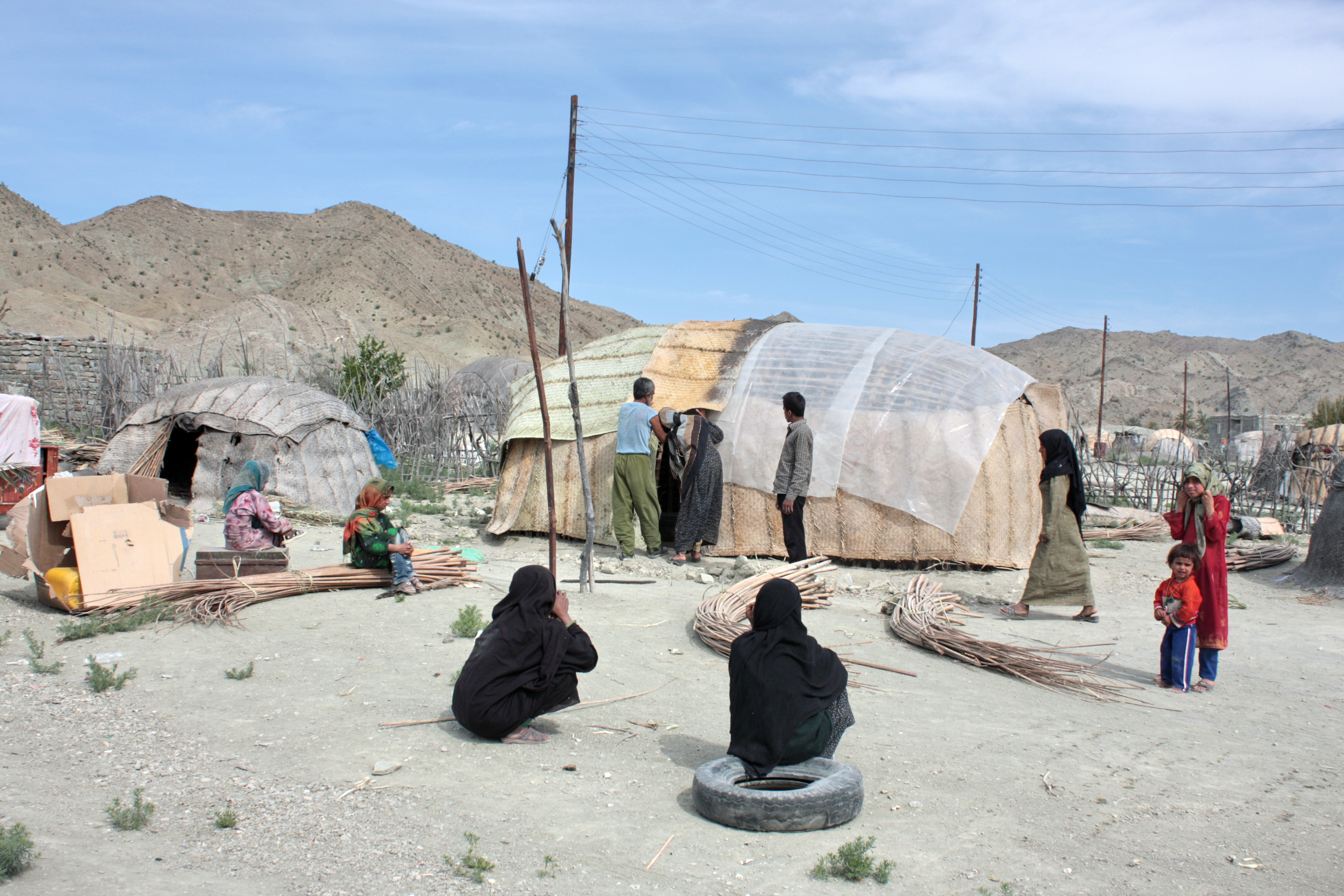

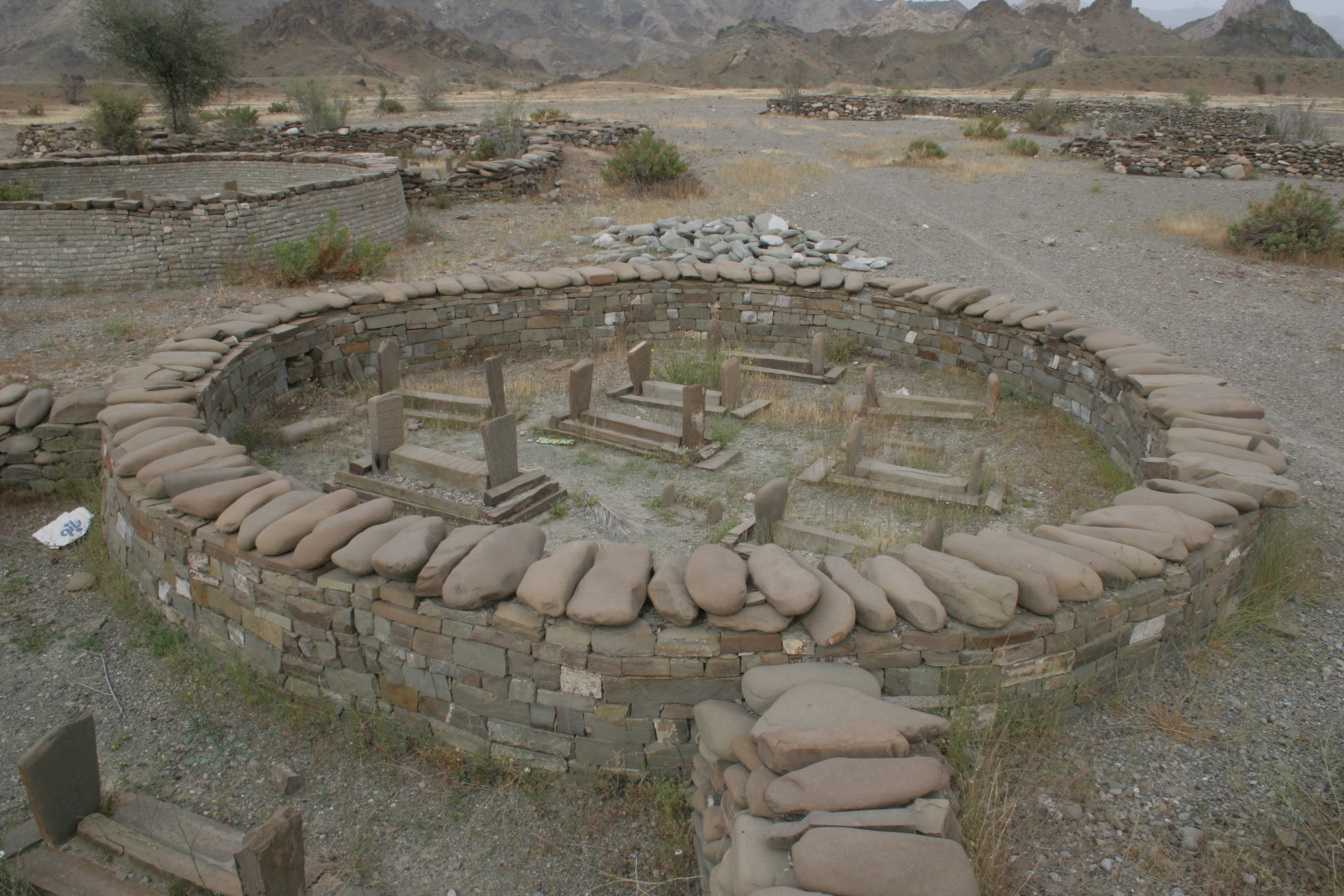

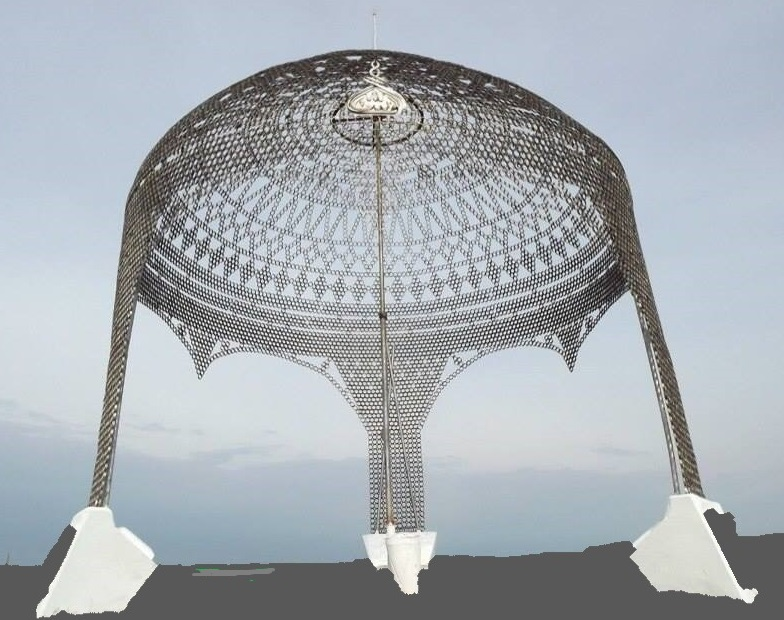

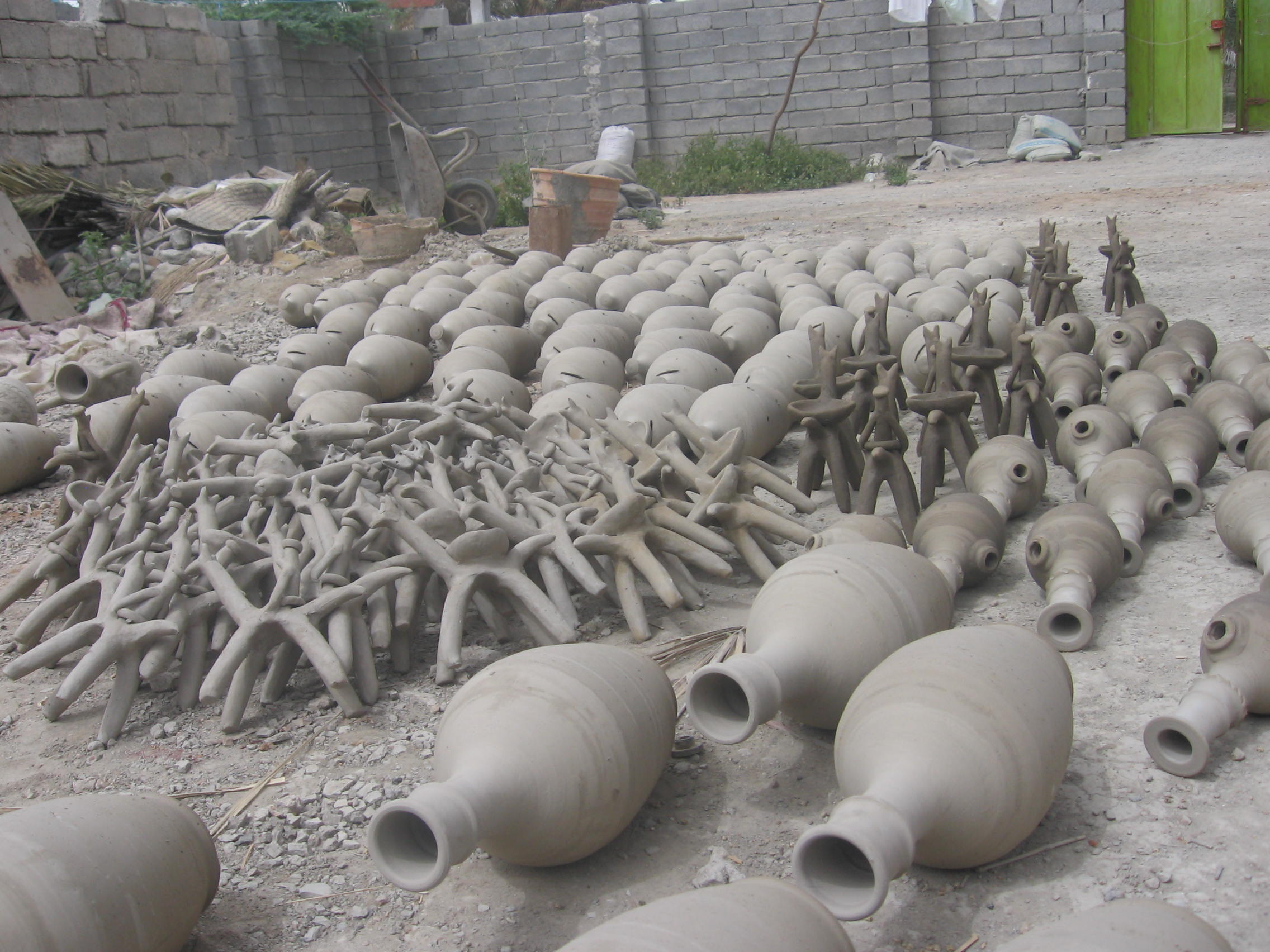
