= Kushk-e Nar =

City in Hormozgan province, Iran

Kushk-e Nar Persian: كوشك نار
- City
- Location within Iran
- Coordinates: 27°15′07″N 52°52′01″E
- Country: Iran
- Province: Hormozgan
- County: Parsian
- District: Kushk-e Nar

Population (2016)
  - Total: 3,260
- Time zone: UTC+3:30 (IRST)

Kushk-e Nar (Persian: كوشك نار) (Note: Also romanized as Koosh Kenar, Kūshk Nār, Kūshk-e Nār, and Kūshkonār; also known as Koshkonār, Kush Kunār, and Kūshk Sār) is a city in, and the capital of, Kushk-e Nar District of Parsian County, (Note: Formerly Gavbandi County) Hormozgan province, Iran. It also serves as the administrative center for Kushk-e Nar Rural District.

== Demographics ==
=== Population ===
At the time of the 2006 National Census, Kushk-e Nar's population was 2,601 in 539 households, when it was a village in Kushk-e Nar Rural District. The following census in 2011 counted 2,902 people in 663 households, by which time the village had been elevated to the status of a city. The 2016 census measured the population of the city as 3,260 people in 847 households.
