= The Tomb =

The Tomb may refer to:

== Literature ==
- The Tomb (comics), by Nunzio DeFilippis and Christina Weir
- The Tomb (novel), by F. Paul Wilson, 1984
- "The Tomb" (short story), by H. P. Lovecraft, 1922

== Film and television ==
- The Tomb (1986 film), directed by Fred Olen Ray
- The Tomb (2007 film), directed by Ulli Lommel
- The Tomb (2009 film), directed by Michael Staininger
- The Tomb, a 2004 Italian horror film directed by Bruno Mattei
- "The Tomb" (Moon Knight), a 2022 episode of the series
- "The Tomb" (Stargate SG-1), a 2001 episode of the series

== Other uses ==
- La Tumba (novel), a 1964 novel by José Agustín
- Runit Dome, a concrete dome encapsulating radioactive debris.

== See also ==
- The Tombs (disambiguation)
- Tomb (disambiguation)
