= Bostanu, Hormozgan =

Bostanu بستانو
- Village
- Location within Iran
- Coordinates: 27°04′51″N 55°59′59″E
- Country: Iran
- Province: Hormozgan
- County: Bandar Abbas
- Bakhsh: Central
- Rural District: Gachin

Population (2006)
  - Total: 1,753
- Time zone: UTC+3:30 (IRST)
  - Summer (DST): UTC+4:30 (IRDT)

Bostanu (Persian: بستانو, also Romanized as Bostānū) is a village in Gachin Rural District, in the Central District of Bandar Abbas County, Hormozgan Province, Iran. At the 2006 census, its population was 1,753, in 384 families.
