= Parsian, Iran =

City in Hormozgan province, Iran

Parsian Persian: پارسیان
- City
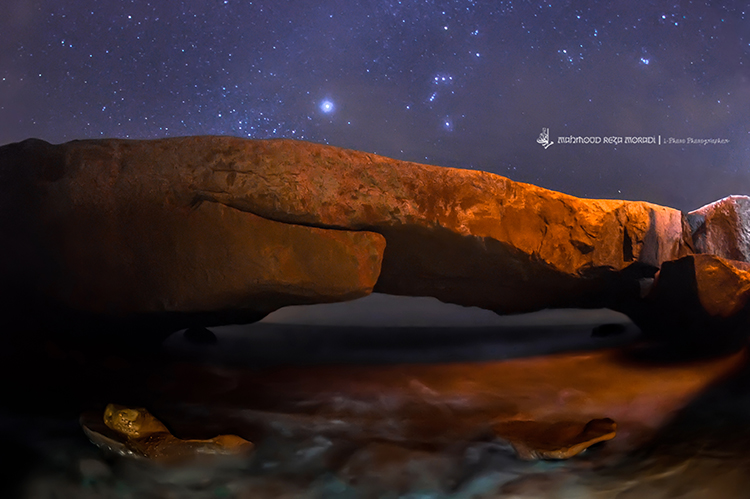
- Parsian at night

- Location within Iran
- Coordinates: 27°12′33″N 53°02′28″E
- Country: Iran
- Province: Hormozgan
- County: Parsian
- District: Central

Population (2016)
  - Total: 18,045
- Time zone: UTC+3:30 (IRST)

Parsian (Persian: پارسیان) (Note: Also romanized as Pārsiān; formerly Gavbandi (گاوبندئ)) is a city in the Central District of Parsian County, (Note: Formerly Gavbandi County) Hormozgan province, Iran, serving as capital of both the county and the district.

== Demographics ==
=== Language ===
The linguistic composition of the city:

Parsian linguistic composition
language	percent
Gavbandi (Persian)	94%
New Persian	5%
Koroshi	1%

=== Population ===
At the time of the 2006 National Census, the city's population was 10,549 in 2,377 households. The following census in 2011 counted 12,544 people in 3,181 households. The 2016 census measured the population of the city as 18,045 people in 4,995 households.
