= Mir-Mahna =

2011 video game

- Publishers: ESPRIS, Tehran, Iran
- Director: Morteza Rezaei Yami
- Producer: ESPRIS
- Designer: Morteza Rezaei Yami
- Programmer: Behnam Aghajani
- Artists: Behnam Shojaei, Ebrahim Diba, and Hossein Diba
- Composer: Payam Azadi
- Engine: TGEA
- Platform: Windows
- Release: 2011
- Genre: FPS

Mir-Mahna (sometimes spelled Mir Mahna) is a computer game based on the life of Mir Mahna, an amir of Kharg, Iran, who successfully fought against Dutch colonial forces in Iran during the reign of Nader Shah in the 1740s. Introduced in August 2010 at Gamescom, Mir-Mahna officially was released in Tehran, Iran, in February 2011 and was supported by the Iran Computer and Video Games Foundation.

Mir-Mahna is the first Iranian game about the life of a contemporary Iranian hero and the second game after Garshasp Gorz-e-Serit to focus on Iranian heroes. The game's storyline is based on a series of books entitled On the Red Marine Roads by Nader Ebrahimi, an Iranian writer, screenwriter, photographer, director and actor. By using traditional Iranian music with modern computer motion capture, the game designers sought to introduce Iranian culture and civilization worldwide. This was part of a larger effort by the Iranian government to use computer games to help convey its culture.
