= Tomb-e Gowhar =

Tomb-e Gowhar تمب گوهر
- Village
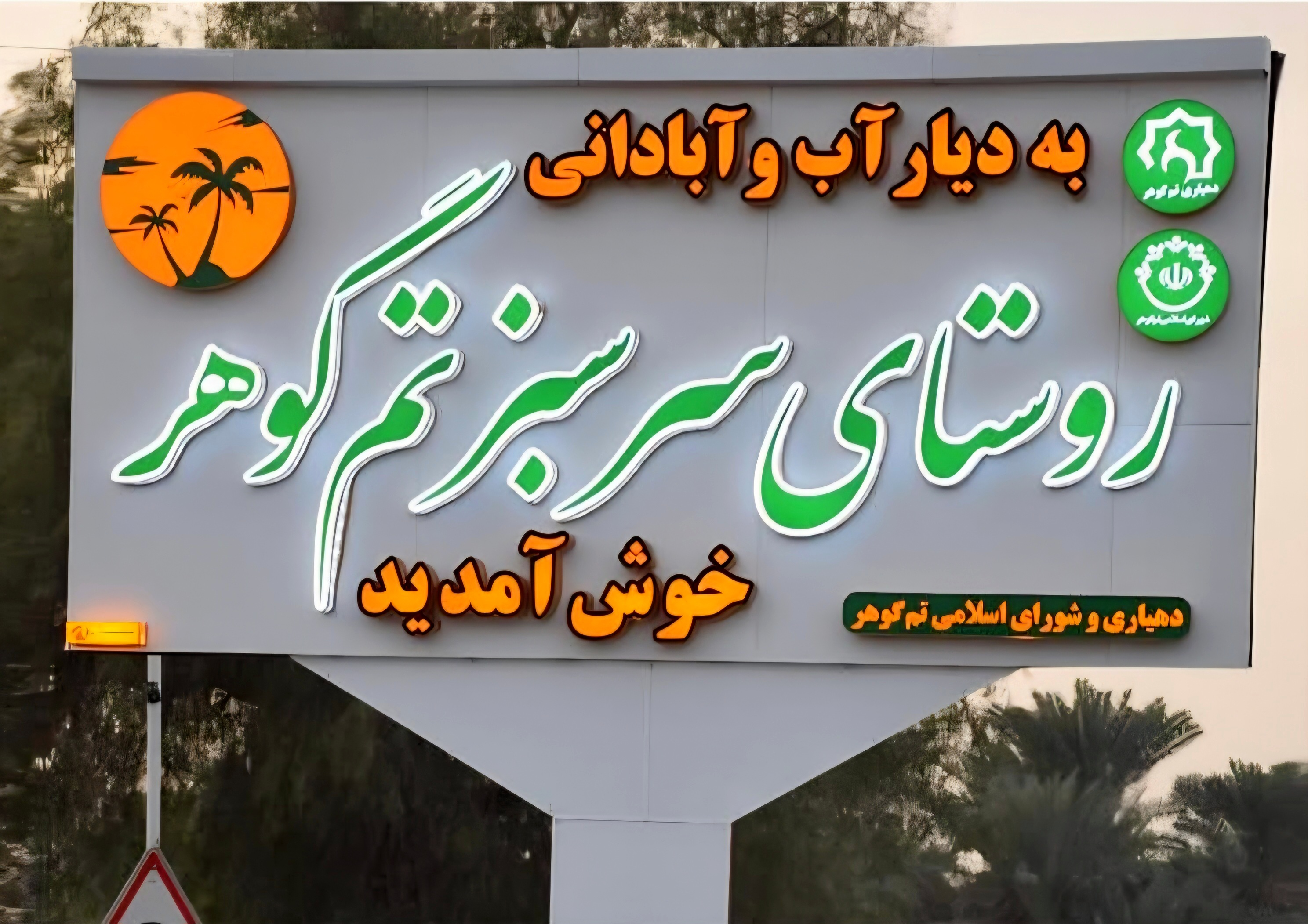

- Location within Iran
- Coordinates: 27°06′54″N 57°00′01″E
- Country: Iran
- Province: Hormozgan
- County: Minab
- Bakhsh: Central
- Rural District: Howmeh

Population (2006)
  - Total: 470
- Time zone: UTC+3:30 (IRST)
  - Summer (DST): UTC+4:30 (IRDT)

Tomb-e Gowhar (Persian: تمب گوهر; also known as Towm-e Gowhar) is a village in Howmeh Rural District, in the Central District of Minab County, Hormozgan Province, Iran. At the 2006 census, its population was 470, in 94 families.
