= Tombu-e Pain =

Tombu-e Pain تمبو پائين
- Village
- Location within Iran
- Coordinates: 26°41′11″N 57°31′04″E
- Country: Iran
- Province: Hormozgan
- County: Minab
- Bakhsh: Senderk
- Rural District: Dar Pahn

Population (2006)
  - Total: 135
- Time zone: UTC+3:30 (IRST)
  - Summer (DST): UTC+4:30 (IRDT)

Tombu-e Pain (Persian: تمبو پائين, also Romanized as Tombū-e Pā’īn; also known as Tonbū-e Pāyīn) is a village in Dar Pahn Rural District, Senderk District, Minab County, Hormozgan Province, Iran. At the 2006 census, its population was 135, in 28 families.
