= Yord-e Jamal =

Yord-e Jamal يردجمال
- Village
- Location within Iran
- Coordinates: 28°52′12″N 54°47′36″E
- Country: Iran
- Province: Fars
- County: Darab
- Bakhsh: Central
- Rural District: Balesh

Population (2006)
  - Total: 197
- Time zone: UTC+3:30 (IRST)
  - Summer (DST): UTC+4:30 (IRDT)

Yord-e Jamal (Persian: يردجمال, also Romanized as Yord-e Jamāl; also known as Yūrd-e Jamāl) is a village in Balesh Rural District, in the Central District of Darab County, Fars province, Iran. At the 2006 census, its population was 197, in 43 families.
