= Konardan, Firuzabad =

Konardan كناردان
- Village
- Location within Iran
- Coordinates: 28°34′12″N 52°36′01″E
- Country: Iran
- Province: Fars
- County: Firuzabad
- Bakhsh: Central
- Rural District: Jaydasht

Population (2006)
  - Total: 74
- Time zone: UTC+3:30 (IRST)
  - Summer (DST): UTC+4:30 (IRDT)

Konardan (Persian: كناردان, also Romanized as Konārdān; also known as Konārdun) is a village in Jaydasht Rural District, in the Central District of Firuzabad County, Fars province, Iran. At the 2006 census, its population was 74, in 17 families.
