= Tombs (surname) =

Tombs is a surname. Notable people with the surname include:

- Francis Tombs, Baron Tombs (1924–2020), English industrialist and politician
- Joseph Harcourt Tombs (1884–1966), English World War I Victoria Cross recipient
- Tina Tombs (born 1962), Canadian golfer

== See also ==
- Combs (surname)
