= Tomb (disambiguation) =

A tomb is a repository for the remains of the dead.

Tomb(s) may also refer to:

- Tomb (album), by Angelo de Augustine, 2019
- Tombs (band), an American post-metal band
- Tombs (surname), a list of people with the name
- Tomb, Iran (disambiguation)
- Tomb, a disc golf putter by Infinite Discs
- The Tombs (restaurant and bar), in the Georgetown neighborhood of Washington, D.C.

== See also ==
- The Tomb (disambiguation)
- The Tombs (disambiguation)
