= Marz, Kerman =

Marz مرز
- Village
- Location within Iran
- Coordinates: 27°06′28″N 57°31′44″E
- Country: Iran
- Province: Kerman
- County: Manujan
- Bakhsh: Central
- Rural District: Geshmiran

Population (2006)
  - Total: 247
- Time zone: UTC+3:30 (IRST)
  - Summer (DST): UTC+4:30 (IRDT)

Marz (Persian: مرز; also known as Ramz) is a village in Geshmiran Rural District, in the Central District of Manujan County, Kerman Province, Iran. At the 2006 census, its population was 247, in 50 families.
