= Charnel house =

Structure for storage of human bones

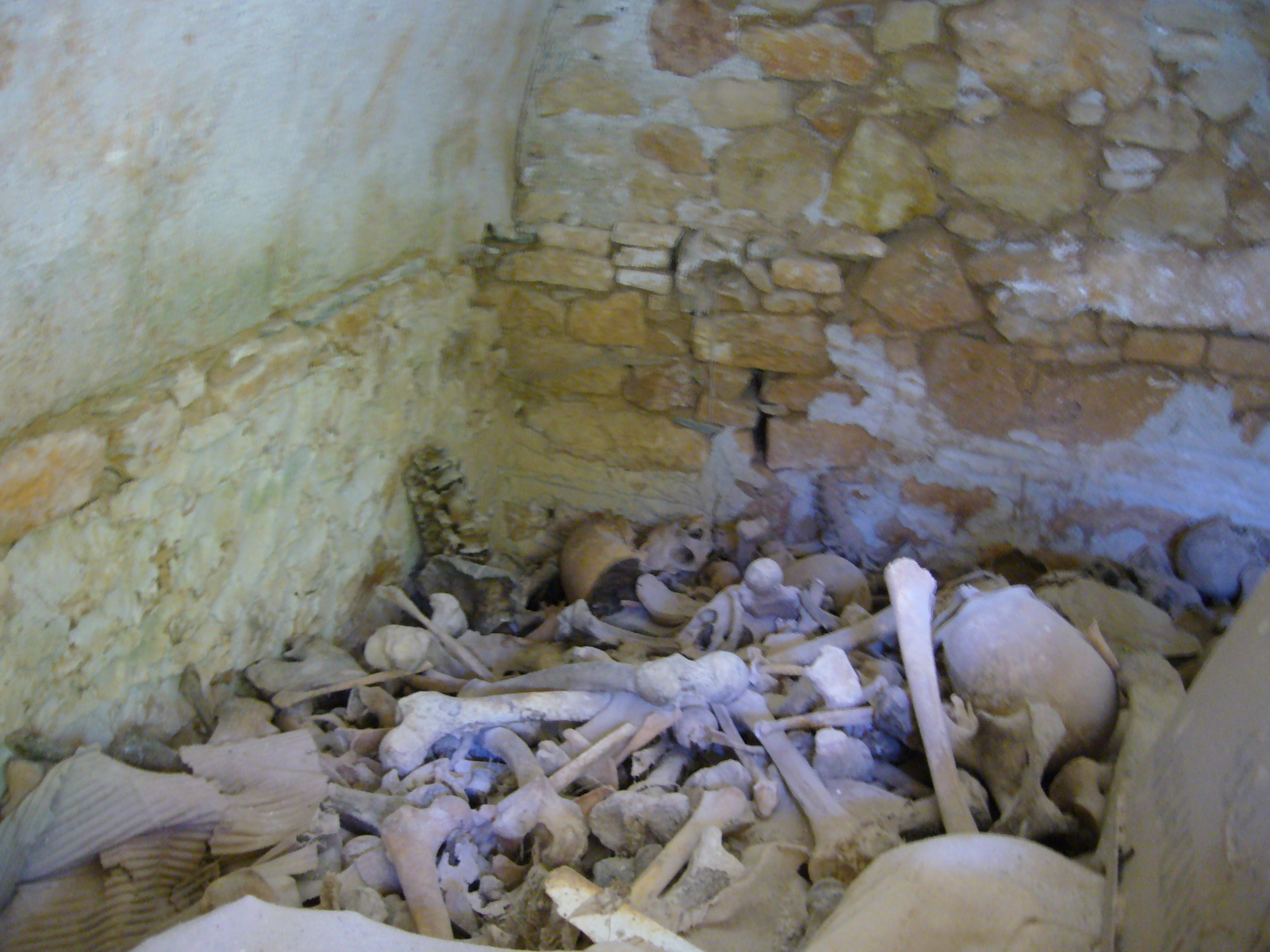
Contents of a Greek Orthodox charnel house showing disarticulated human skeletal remains

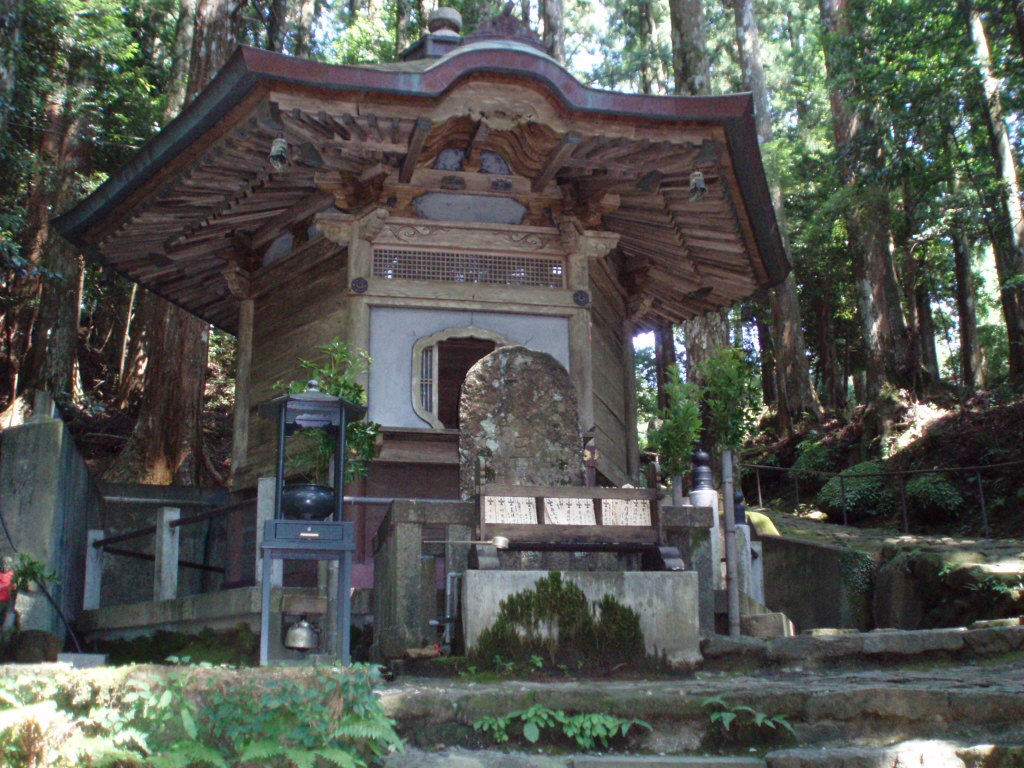
Charnel house of Amidadera temple (Nachikatsuura, Wakayama, Japan)

A charnel house is a vault or building where human skeletal remains are temporarily stored until full decomposition of flesh. They are often built near churches for depositing bones that are unearthed while digging graves. The term can also be used more generally as a description of a place filled with death and destruction.

The term is borrowed from Middle French charnel, from Late Latin carnāle ("graveyard"), from Latin carnālis ("of the flesh").

== Africa, Europe, and Asia ==
In countries where ground suitable for burial was scarce, corpses would be interred for approximately five years following death, thereby allowing decomposition to occur. After this, the remains would be exhumed and moved to an ossuary or charnel house, thereby allowing the original burial place to be reused. In modern times, the use of charnel houses is a characteristic of cultures living in rocky or arid places, such as the Cyclades archipelago and other Greek islands in the Aegean Sea.

=== Monastery of the Transfiguration (Saint Catherine's), Mount Sinai ===
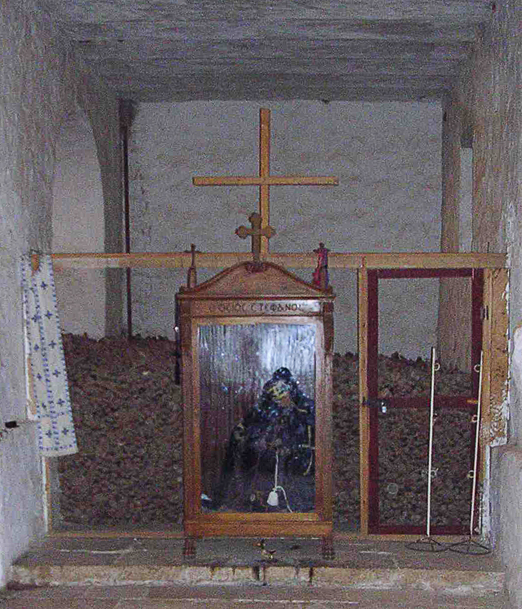
Charnel House at Saint Catherine's Monastery, Mount Sinai

The Chapel of Bones in Évora, Portugal

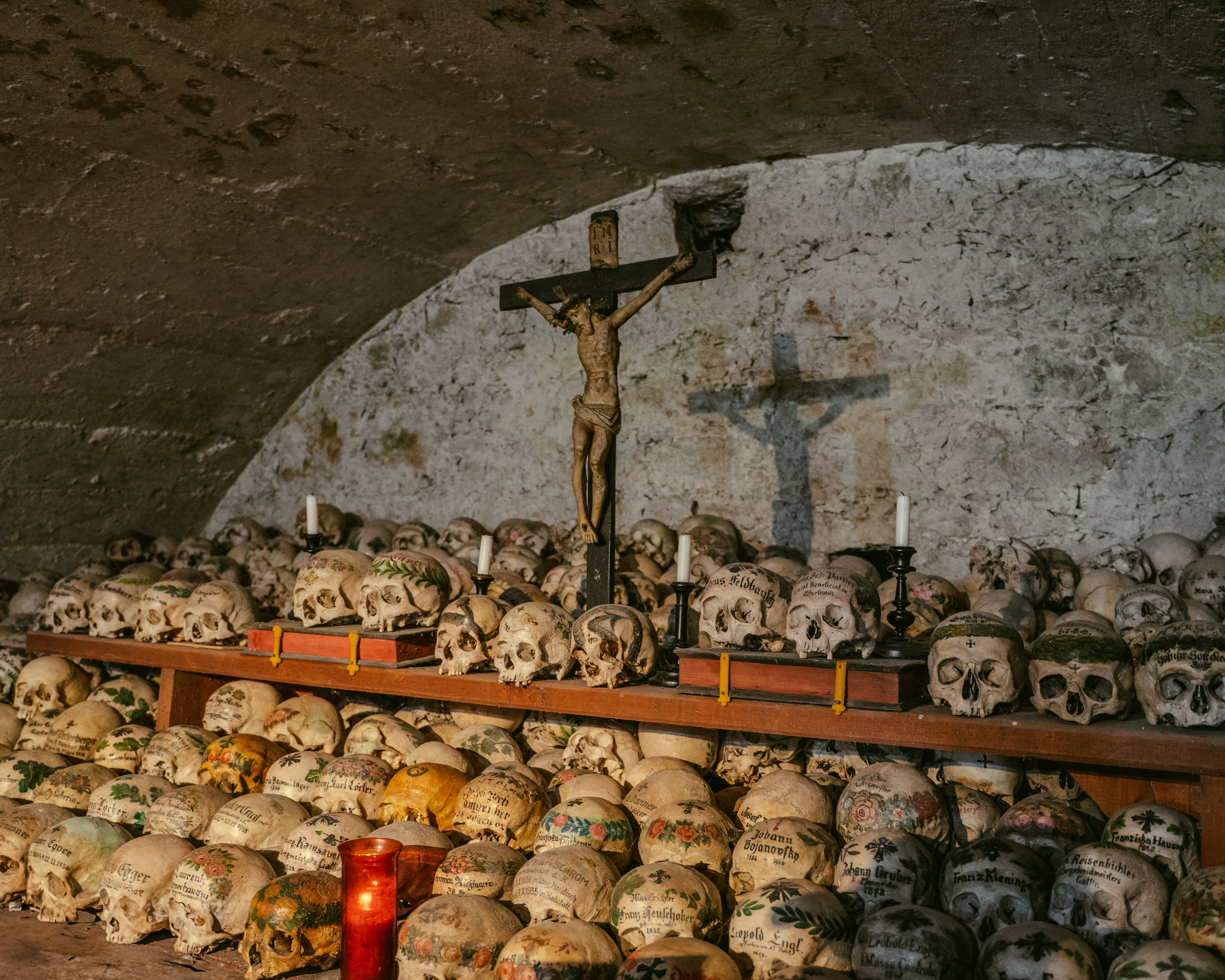
Skulls in the still-used Hallstatt charnel house in Austria. After a short burial in the limited cemetery space, the bones are transferred and relatives decorate the skulls of their loved ones with names and flowers that are symbolic of some characteristic, such as love or bravery.

Saint Catherine's Monastery in the Sinai Peninsula is famous for having a working charnel house. Saint Catherine's was founded by Justinian in the early 6th century on the site of an older monastery, founded about 313 AD and named for Helena of Constantinople. The monastery comprises the whole Autonomous Church of Sinai under the Patriarchate of Jerusalem. The site lies at the foot of what some believe to be the biblical Mount Sinai where Jews, Christians, and Muslims believe Moses received the Ten Commandments.

Since the Sinai Peninsula is an inhospitable place, the brethren of St. Catherine's have struggled to eke out a subsistence-level existence. The difficulty in establishing a large cemetery in the rocky ground notwithstanding, relics are also gathered for temporal and spiritual reasons: a reminder to the monks of their impending death and fate in the hereafter. The Archbishop of Saint Catherine's is commonly the Abbot as well. After death, he is afforded the dignity of a special niche within the "Skull-House".

== North America ==
A charnel house is also a structure commonly seen in some Native American societies of the Eastern United States. Major examples are the Hopewell cultures and Mississippian cultures.

These houses were used specifically for mortuary services and, although they required many more resources to build and maintain than a crypt, they were widely used. They offered privacy and shelter as well as enough workspace for mortuary proceedings. These proceedings included cremation (in the included crematorium) as well as defleshing of the body before the cremation.

At some Middle Woodland mound sites, burial mounds were constructed over pits that served to contain human remains and associated mortuary activity before final burial arrangements.

Once the houses had served their purpose, they were burned to the ground and covered by earth, creating a sort of burial mound.

Anthropologist William F. Romain in Mysteries of the Hopewell notes that these charnel houses were built in the form of a square, and their diagonals could be aligned to the direction of maximum and minimum moon-sets both north and south.

== England ==
Charnel houses were common in England, primarily before the Reformation. Because they were associated with the Catholic Church, using charnel houses fell out of practice after the Reformation to the point that modern people barely knew they had existed. "Charnelling continued with gusto throughout the late medieval period. However, in the mid-16th century the Dissolution of the Monasteries changed their standing completely. No longer were charnels things of status, instead thought of as symbols of close living-dead relations which reflected so-called 'Popish' superstition."

The charnel house at Spitalfields, for example, was in use during Roman times through to the medieval period. "As a large burial ground that was much-used over the space of several centuries, it would not be unusual for old bones to be disturbed when new graves were being dug. These bones would be removed from the ground to make space for newly-buried corpses, and stored instead in the churchyard's charnel house."

During the 1950s reconstruction of St. Bride's Church in Fleet Street, a medieval charnel house was uncovered, "containing an estimated 7000 human remains organised in a chequer-board pattern. Some of the skulls were placed in a linear arrangement, with the remainder of human bones placed in a macabre looking pile of bones."

At the Abbey of Bury St Edmunds, Suffolk, around 1300 the abbot requested the "charnel chapel to be built, as an act of piety and charity … of shaped stone, and in future bones could be placed in it or buried under its vaults, and provided with two chaplains to serve this 'most celebrated place'".

== See also ==
- Mortuary house
- Ossuary

== Sources ==
- Papaioannou, Evangelos (1980) The Monastery of St. Catherine, Sinai, St. Catherine's Monastery: Guidebook, 48 pp., Cairo: Isis Press.
- Craig-Atkins, E., Crangle, J. N., Hadley, D. 'The Nameless Dead: Inside a Medieval Charnel Chapel', Current Archaeology, 321 (2016) 40–47.
- Craig-Atkins, E., Crangle, J. N., Barnwell, P. S., Hadley, D., Adams, A. T., Atkins, A., McGinn, J. R. and James, A., 'Charnel Practices in Medieval England: New Perspectives', Mortality, 24, 2, (2019) 145–166.
- Crangle, J. N., A Study of Post-Depositional Funerary Practices in Medieval England. (PHD Thesis: University of Sheffield, 2016).
- Koudounaris, P., The Empire of Death: A Cultural History of Ossuaries and Charnel Houses (London: Thames and Hudson, 2011).
