= Yord-e Anjir =

Yord-e Anjir يردانجير
- Village
- Location within Iran
- Coordinates: 28°49′34″N 54°46′51″E
- Country: Iran
- Province: Fars
- County: Darab
- Bakhsh: Central
- Rural District: Balesh

Population (2006)
  - Total: 353
- Time zone: UTC+3:30 (IRST)
  - Summer (DST): UTC+4:30 (IRDT)

Yord-e Anjir (Persian: يردانجير, also Romanized as Yord-e Anjīr; also known as Yowrd-e Anjīr and Yūrd-e Anjīr) is a village in Balesh Rural District, in the Central District of Darab County, Fars province, Iran. At the 2006 census, its population was 353, in 77 families.
