= Konardan, Jahrom =

Konardan كناردان
- Village
- Location within Iran
- Coordinates: 28°37′34″N 53°18′56″E
- Country: Iran
- Province: Fars
- County: Jahrom
- Bakhsh: Central
- Rural District: Jolgah

Population (2006)
  - Total: 793
- Time zone: UTC+3:30 (IRST)
  - Summer (DST): UTC+4:30 (IRDT)

Konardan (Persian: كناردان, also Romanized as Konārdān) is a village in Jolgah Rural District, in the Central District of Jahrom County, Fars province, Iran. At the 2006 census, its population was 793, in 199 families.
