= William Romain (archaeologist) =

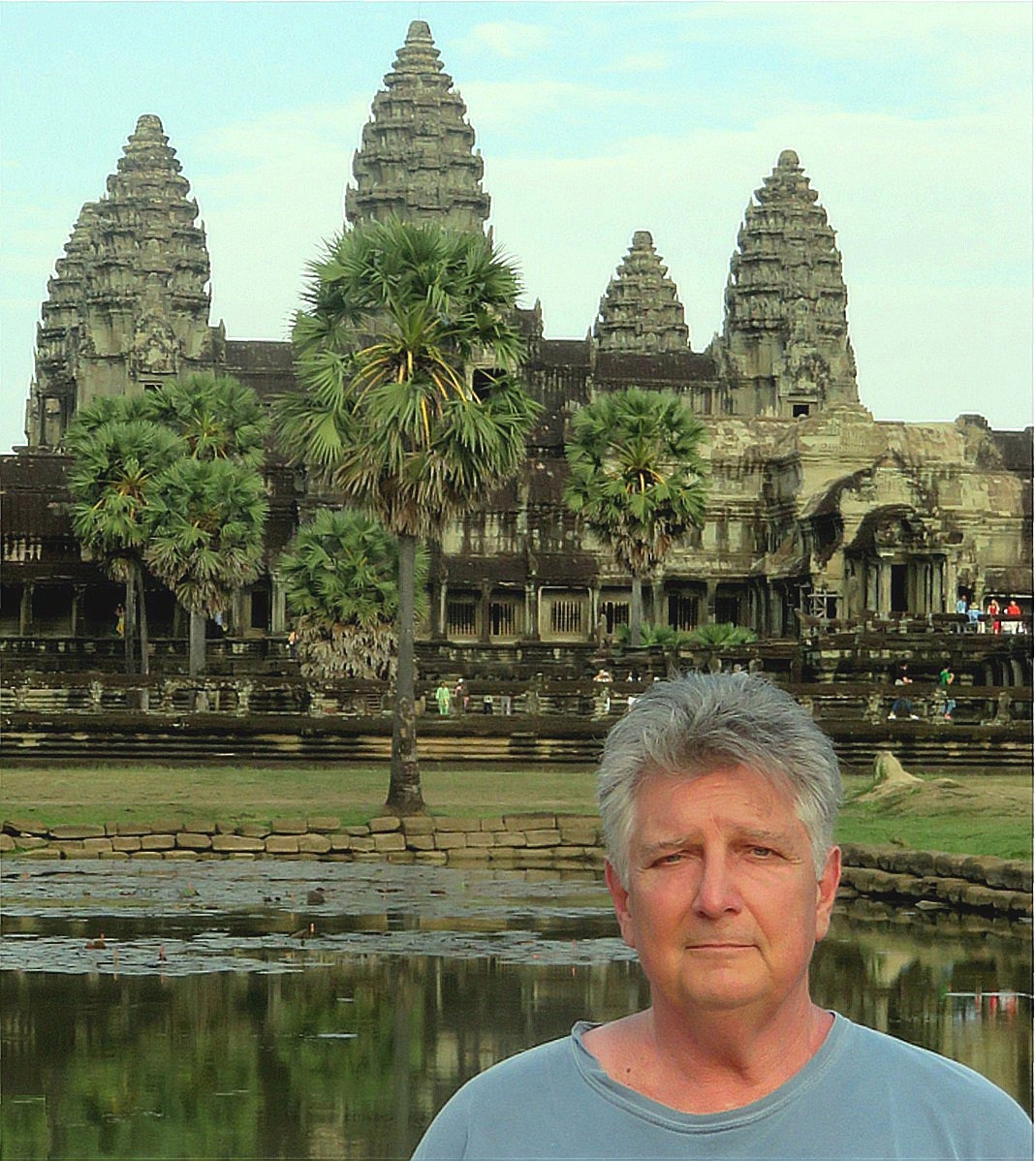

William Francis Romain (born 1948) is an American archaeologist, archaeoastronomer, and author. William Romain received his Ph.D. in archaeology from the University of Leicester and M.A. and B.A. degrees in anthropology from Kent State University. He specializes in the study of ancient religions, cognitive archaeology, and archaeoastronomy. William Romain is a Research Associate with the Indiana University, Department of Earth and Atmospheric Sciences and Managing Editor for the Journal of Astronomy in Culture. He serves on the editorial board of the Midcontinental Journal of Archaeology and is a Fellow of the Royal Geographical Society and The Explorers Club. Romain has served as an advisor to the Board of Trustees for the Heartland Earthworks Conservancy, as well as Research Associate with the Indiana University, Museum of Archaeology and Anthropology and Newark Earthworks Center at Ohio State University. He is a recipient of the Archaeological Society of Ohio's Robert Converse award for Outstanding Contributions to Ohio Archaeology. William Romain is a licensed private pilot (fixed wing aircraft) and holds certifications in marine celestial navigation and search and rescue land navigation. He has conducted archaeoastronomic fieldwork in the Eastern United States, China, Inner Mongolia, Tibet, Thailand, Cambodia, and Myanmar (Burma).

In 2011 Romain led a team of archaeologists (The Serpent Mound Project) in an investigation of Serpent Mound, in Adams County, Ohio. This was the first major investigation of the effigy in more than one hundred years and included Geoprobe coring, hand coring, limited excavation, ground-penetrating radar, and electric resistivity analysis. Among the results were new radiocarbon dates for the effigy suggesting it was built about 2,300 years ago by people of the Early Woodland period. Other work has included archaeoastronomic assessments for Poverty Point and Watson Brake in Louisiana, Mound City in Ohio, the Newark Earthworks, Great Hopewell Road in Ohio, and Cahokia in Illinois. Most recently William Romain has published new archaeoastronomic findings for Angkor Wat in Cambodia, the Great Ziggurat of Ur in Iraq, Xanadu in Inner Mongolia, and the Jokhang, Samye, and Tradruk temples in Tibet.

Romain's research identified multiple solstice alignments at Poverty Point and Watson Brake. Watson Brake is the earliest known geometrically-shaped earthwork in North America. At Cahokia in Illinois, Romain showed how Rattlesnake Causeway and Rattlesnake Mound were likely associated with the Milky Way Path of Souls and how orientation to the Milky Way likely accounts for the site's peculiar 5-degree skew from true north. Research at Angkor identified multiple solstice alignments for Angkor Wat and more than a dozen surrounding temples. Also proposed were geomantic and archaeoastronomic explanations for the location of Angkor Wat and Rong Chen temple. At Ur, in Mesopotamia, Romain found that not only is the Great Ziggurat lunar-aligned - but the entire city is lunar aligned. (The moon was the patron god for Ur.) Research at Xanadu in Inner Mongolia showed how the summer palace for Kublai Khan was situated and oriented with respect to feng shui concepts and the winter and summer solstices. Research in Tibet provided explanations for the locations and orientations the Jokhang, Samye and Tradruk temples and showed how the emperors' tombs in the Chongye Valley were oriented to selected mountains having legendary importance. Most recently Romain has documented the probable location and celestial alignments for the St. Louis Mound Group in St. Louis, Missouri. This group of 25 mounds located across the Mississippi River from Cahokia was leveled in the 1800s as a result of urban development.

== Books ==
- An Archaeology of the Sacred: Adena-Hopewell Astronomy and Landscape Archaeology (The Ancient Earthworks Project, 2015)
- Shamans of the Lost World: A Cognitive Approach to the Prehistoric Religion of the Ohio Hopewell (AltaMira Press, 2009)
- Mysteries of the Hopewell: Astronomers, Geometers, and Magicians of the Eastern Woodlands (University of Akron Press, 2000)
