= Catacombs (disambiguation) =

Catacombs are ancient underground passageways or subterranean cemeteries.

Catacombs may also refer to:

== Media ==
=== Film ===
- Catacombs (1965 film), a British film
- Catacombs (1988 film), an American film
- Catacombs (2007 film), an American film
- Catacombe (film), a 2018 Dutch film
- The Catacombs (film), a 1940 Czech film

=== Music ===
- Catacombs (band), American doom metal project
- Catacombs (album), a 2009 album by Cass McCombs
- "Catacomb", a song by Stereophonics on their 2013 album Graffiti on the Train

=== Video games ===
- Catacomb (video game), a 1989 2-D top-down third-person shooter
- Catacomb 3-D, video game

== Localities ==
- Catacombs Cave, cave in Lava Beds National Monument, California
- Catacombs of Paris, underground ossuaries in Paris, France
- Catacombs (sex club), a gay and lesbian S/M fisting club in San Francisco

== Other ==
- Catacomb culture, the Bronze Age culture
