= Catacombs (band) =

Doom metal solo project

- Origin: Arizona, U.S.
- Genres: Funeral doom
- Years active: 2000–2016, 2020s–present
- Labels: Cthulhu, Black-Metal.com, Moribund, Solitude
- Members: Xathagorra Mlandroth
- Website: xathagorraindustries.wordpress.com

Catacombs is a funeral doom solo project of Xathagorra Mlandroth (born John Del Russi). The band's music was deeply inspired by Lovecraftian horror and the Cthulhu Mythos, often directly referencing it lyrically. The project followed Xathagorra's other endeavor Hierophant but was concluded when Xathagorra began releasing all his subsequent music under the name Xathagorra through his record label Xathagorra Industries. Xathagorra Industries re-released Catacombs albums in physical format as well as through Xathagorra's Bandcamp page.

== Discography ==
=== Albums ===
- In the Depths of R'lyeh CD (Moribund Records 2006)

=== EPs ===
- Catacombs MCD (Cthulhu Productions 2003)
- Echoes through the Catacombs MCD (Black-Metal.com 2004)
- Echoes through the Catacombs Re-release (Solitude Productions 2007)
