= Buchir Rural District =

Rural district in Hormozgan province, Iran

Buchir Rural District Persian: دهستان بوچير
- Rural District
- Location within Iran
- Coordinates: 27°02′15″N 53°35′32″E
- Country: Iran
- Province: Hormozgan
- County: Parsian
- District: Central
- Capital: Buchir

Population (2016)
  - Total: 5,582
- Time zone: UTC+3:30 (IRST)

Buchir Rural District (Persian: دهستان بوچير) is in the Central District of Parsian County, (Note: Formerly Gavbandi County) Hormozgan province, Iran. Its capital is the village of Buchir.

== Demographics ==
=== Population ===
At the time of the 2006 National Census, the rural district's population was 4,401 in 996 households. There were 5,353 inhabitants in 3,289 households at the following census of 2011. The 2016 census measured the population of the rural district as 5,582 in 1,549 households. The most populous of its five villages was Buchir, with 3,382 people.
