= Crypt (disambiguation) =

A crypt is a stone chamber.

Crypt may refer also to:

== Arts, entertainment and media ==
- Crypt Records, a record label
- Crypts, a fictional alien race in The Man from Nowhere, a Dan Dare story
- The Crypt (film), a 2009 horror film
- The Crypt, a blog hosted by Politico
- "The Crypt", a 1987 poem by David Sandner
- "The Crypt", season 2, episode 14 of Crown Lake, a YouTube anthology web series (2020)

=== Amusement park attractions ===
- The Crypt (Kings Dominion), a HUSS Floorless Top Spin at Kings Dominion amusement park, formerly named Tomb Raider: Firefall
- The Crypt (Kings Island), a HUSS Giant Top Spin formerly located at Kings Island amusement park, originally named Tomb Raider: The Ride

=== Television episodes ===
- "Crypt", Logan's Run episode 7 (1977)
- "The Crypt", Freewheelers series 8, episode 9 (1973)

== Science and technology ==
=== Botany ===
- Cryptocoryne, a genus of plants colloquially named Crypt
- Cryptopus (plant), an orchid genus abbreviated Crypt

=== Computing ===
- Crypt (C), a standard library function in C
- Crypt (Unix), a cryptographic utility program in Unix

=== Medicine ===
- Crypt (anatomy), a type of anatomical structure
- Cryptorchidism, the absence of one or both testes from the scrotum
- Crypts of Lieberkühn, anatomical crypts that occur in the intestinal tract

== Other uses ==
- The Crypt School a Grammar School in Gloucester, England
- "The Crypt" is a nickname for the Crypto.com_Arena, a multi-purpose indoor arena in Los Angeles formerly known as the Staples Center.

== See also ==
- CRIPT, a gene
- Crypto (disambiguation)
- Cryptography, the study of techniques for secure communication
