= Mehregan Rural District =

Rural district in Hormozgan province, Iran

Mehregan Rural District Persian: دهستان مهرگان
- Rural District
- Location within Iran
- Coordinates: 27°09′40″N 53°13′08″E
- Country: Iran
- Province: Hormozgan
- County: Parsian
- District: Central
- Capital: Behdeh

Population (2016)
  - Total: 9,708
- Time zone: UTC+3:30 (IRST)

Mehregan Rural District (Persian: دهستان مهرگان) is in the Central District of Parsian County, (Note: Formerly Gavbandi County) Hormozgan province, Iran. Its capital is the village of Behdeh.

== Demographics ==
=== Population ===
At the time of the 2006 National Census, the rural district's population was 3,091 in 688 households. There were 13,331 inhabitants in 3,212 households at the following census of 2011. The 2016 census measured the population of the rural district as 9,708 in 2,634 households. The most populous of its 22 villages was Behdeh, with 1,923 people.
