= Kushk-e Nar Rural District =

Rural district in Hormozgan province, Iran

Kushk-e Nar Rural District Persian: دهستان کوشکنار
- Rural District
- Location within Iran
- Coordinates: 27°16′17″N 52°51′35″E
- Country: Iran
- Province: Hormozgan
- County: Parsian
- District: Kushk-e Nar
- Capital: Kushk-e Nar

Population (2016)
  - Total: 4,841
- Time zone: UTC+3:30 (IRST)

Kushk-e Nar Rural District (Persian: دهستان کوشکنار) is in Kushk-e Nar District of Parsian County, (Note: Formerly Gavbandi County) Hormozgan province, Iran. It is administered from the city of Kushk-e Nar.

== Demographics ==
=== Population ===
At the time of the 2006 National Census, the rural district's population was 7,771 in 1,462 households. There were 4,482 inhabitants in 1,008 households at the following census of 2011. The 2016 census measured the population of the rural district as 4,841 in 1,338 households. The most populous of its 10 villages was Amani, with 1,153 people.
