= Central District (Parsian County) =

District in Hormozgan province, Iran

Central District (Parsian County) Persian: بخش مرکزی شهرستان پارسیان
- District
- Location within Iran
- Coordinates: 27°03′21″N 53°24′57″E
- Country: Iran
- Province: Hormozgan
- County: Parsian
- Capital: Parsian

Population (2016)
  - Total: 38,030
- Time zone: UTC+3:30 (IRST)

The Central District of Parsian County (Note: Formerly Gavbandi County) (Persian: بخش مرکزی شهرستان پارسیان) is in Hormozgan province, Iran. Its capital is the city of Parsian. (Note: Formerly Gavbandi)

== History ==
After the 2011 National Census, the village of Dashti was elevated to the status of a city.

== Demographics ==
=== Population ===
At the time of the 2006 census, the district's population was 18,041 in 4,061 households. The following census in 2011 counted 31,228 people in 7,682 households. The 2016 census measured the population of the district as 38,030 inhabitants in 10,385 households.

=== Administrative divisions ===
Central District (Parsian County) Population
Administrative Divisions	2006	2011	2016
Buchir RD	4,401	5,353	5,582
Mehregan RD	3,091	13,331	9,708
Dashti (city)			4,695
Parsian (city)	10,549	12,544	18,045
Total	18,041	31,228	38,030
RD =Rural District
