= Behdasht Rural District =

Rural district in Hormozgan province, Iran

Behdasht Rural District Persian: دهستان بهدشت
- Rural District
- Location within Iran
- Coordinates: 27°10′15″N 53°03′30″E
- Country: Iran
- Province: Hormozgan
- County: Parsian
- District: Kushk-e Nar
- Capital: Ziarat

Population (2016)
  - Total: 4,465
- Time zone: UTC+3:30 (IRST)

Behdasht Rural District (Persian: دهستان بهدشت) is in Kushk-e Nar District of Parsian County, (Note: Formerly Gavbandi County) Hormozgan province, Iran. Its capital is the village of Ziarat. The previous capital of the rural district was the village of Dashti, now a city.

== Demographics ==
=== Population ===
At the time of the 2006 National Census, the rural district's population was 11,557 in 2,449 households. There were 4,231 inhabitants in 1,000 households at the following census of 2011. The 2016 census measured the population of the rural district as 4,465 in 1,246 households. The most populous of its five villages was Setolu, with 1,639 people.
