= Kushk-e Nar District =

District in Hormozgan province, Iran

Kushk-e Nar District Persian: بخش کوشکنار
- District
- Location within Iran
- Coordinates: 27°12′57″N 52°58′50″E
- Country: Iran
- Province: Hormozgan
- County: Parsian
- Capital: Kushk-e Nar

Population (2016)
  - Total: 12,566
- Time zone: UTC+3:30 (IRST)

Kushk-e Nar District (Persian: بخش کوشکنار) is in Parsian County, (Note: Formerly Gavbandi County) Hormozgan province, Iran. Its capital is the city of Kushk-e Nar.

== History ==
After the 2006 National Census, the village of Kushk-e Nar was elevated to the status of a city.

== Demographics ==
=== Population ===
At the time of the 2006 census, the district's population was 19,328 in 3,911 households. The following census in 2011 counted 11,615 people in 2,671 households. The 2016 census measured the population of the district as 12,566 inhabitants in 3,431 households.

=== Administrative divisions ===
Kushk-e Nar District Population
Administrative Divisions	2006	2011	2016
Behdasht RD	11,557	4,231	4,465
Kushk-e Nar RD	7,771	4,482	4,841
Kushk-e Nar (city)		2,902	3,260
Total	19,328	11,615	12,566
RD = Rural District
