= Parsian County =

County in Hormozgan province, Iran

Parsian County Persian: شهرستان پارسیان
- County
- Location of Parsian County in Hormozgan province (left, yellow)

- Location of Hormozgan province in Iran
- Coordinates: 27°03′N 53°17′E
- Country: Iran
- Province: Hormozgan
- Capital: Parsian
- Districts: Central, Kushk-e Nar

Area
  - Total: 1,637 km^{2} (632 sq mi)

Population (2016)
  - Total: 50,596
  - Density: 30.91/km^{2} (80.05/sq mi)
- Time zone: UTC+3:30 (IRST)

Parsian County (Persian: شهرستان پارسیان) (Note: Formerly Gavbandi County (شهرستان گاوبندئ)) is in Hormozgan province, Iran. Its capital is the city of Parsian. (Note: Formerly Gavbandi (گاوبندئ))

== History ==
After the 2006 National Census, the village of Kushk-e Nar was elevated to the status of a city. After the 2011 census, the village of Dashti rose to city status as well.

== Demographics ==
=== Population ===
At the time of the 2006 National Census, the county's population was 37,369 in 7,972 households. The following census in 2011 counted 42,843 people in 10,331 households. The 2016 census measured the population of the county as 50,596 in 13,816 households.

=== Administrative divisions ===
Parsian County's population history and administrative structure over three consecutive censuses are shown in the following table.

Parsian County Population
Administrative Divisions	2006	2011	2016
Central District	18,041	31,228	38,030
Buchir RD	4,401	5,353	5,582
Mehregan RD	3,091	13,331	9,708
Dashti (city)			4,695
Parsian (city)	10,549	12,544	18,045
Kushk-e Nar District	19,328	11,615	12,566
Behdasht RD	11,557	4,231	4,465
Kushk-e Nar RD	7,771	4,482	4,841
Kushk-e Nar (city)		2,902	3,260
Total	37,369	42,843	50,596
RD = Rural District

== Geographic changes ==
Iranian Parliament has enacted a new law to separate Parsian County from Hormozgan province and add to Fars province. Joining the province will bring prosperity to this region. Recently, there have been some protests against this new law in Hormozgan province, since it cut the direct access of Hormozgan to gas-rich fields and industrial regions in nearby Bushehr province.

== See also ==
Media related to Parsian County at Wikimedia Commons
