= Hormozgan province =

Province of Iran

Hormozgan province استان هرمزگان (Persian)
- Province
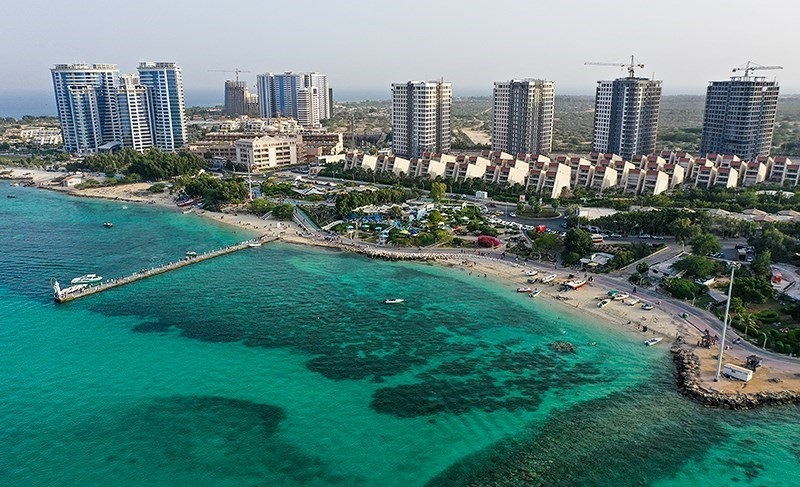
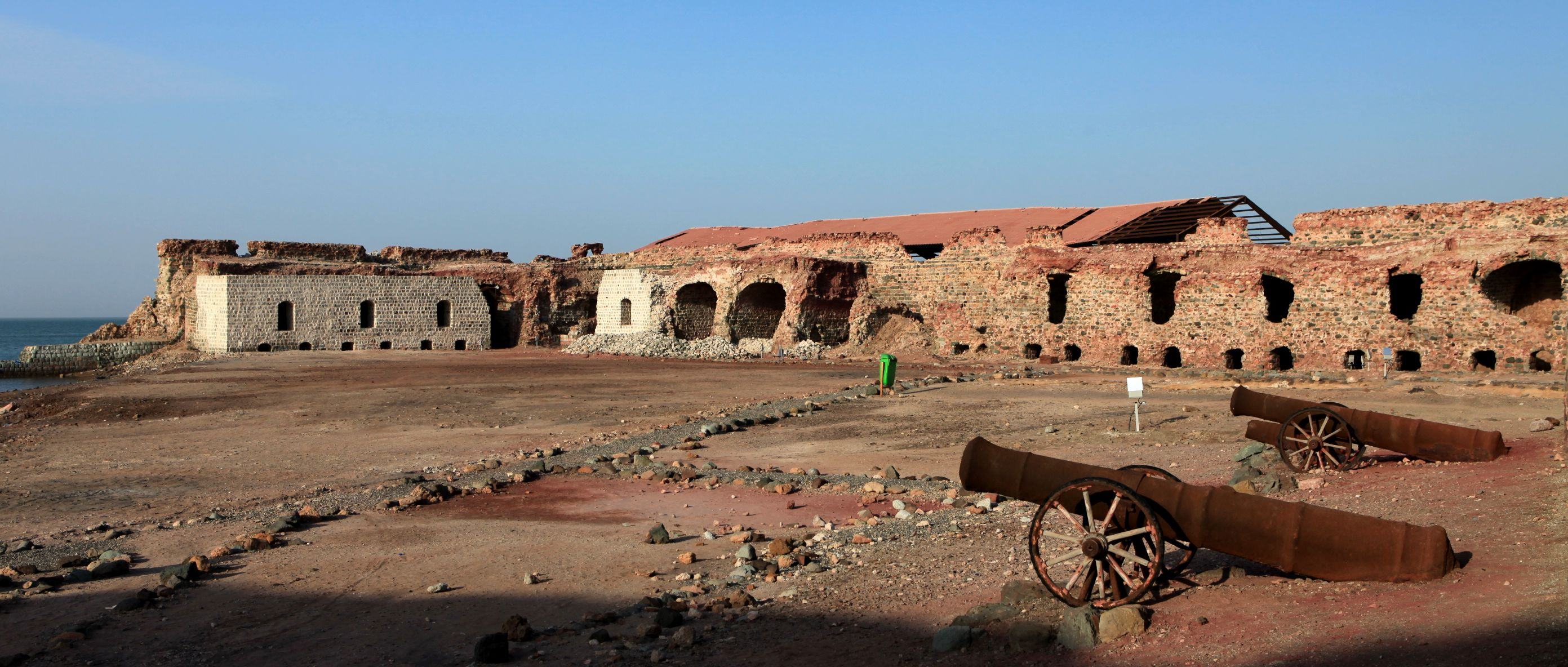
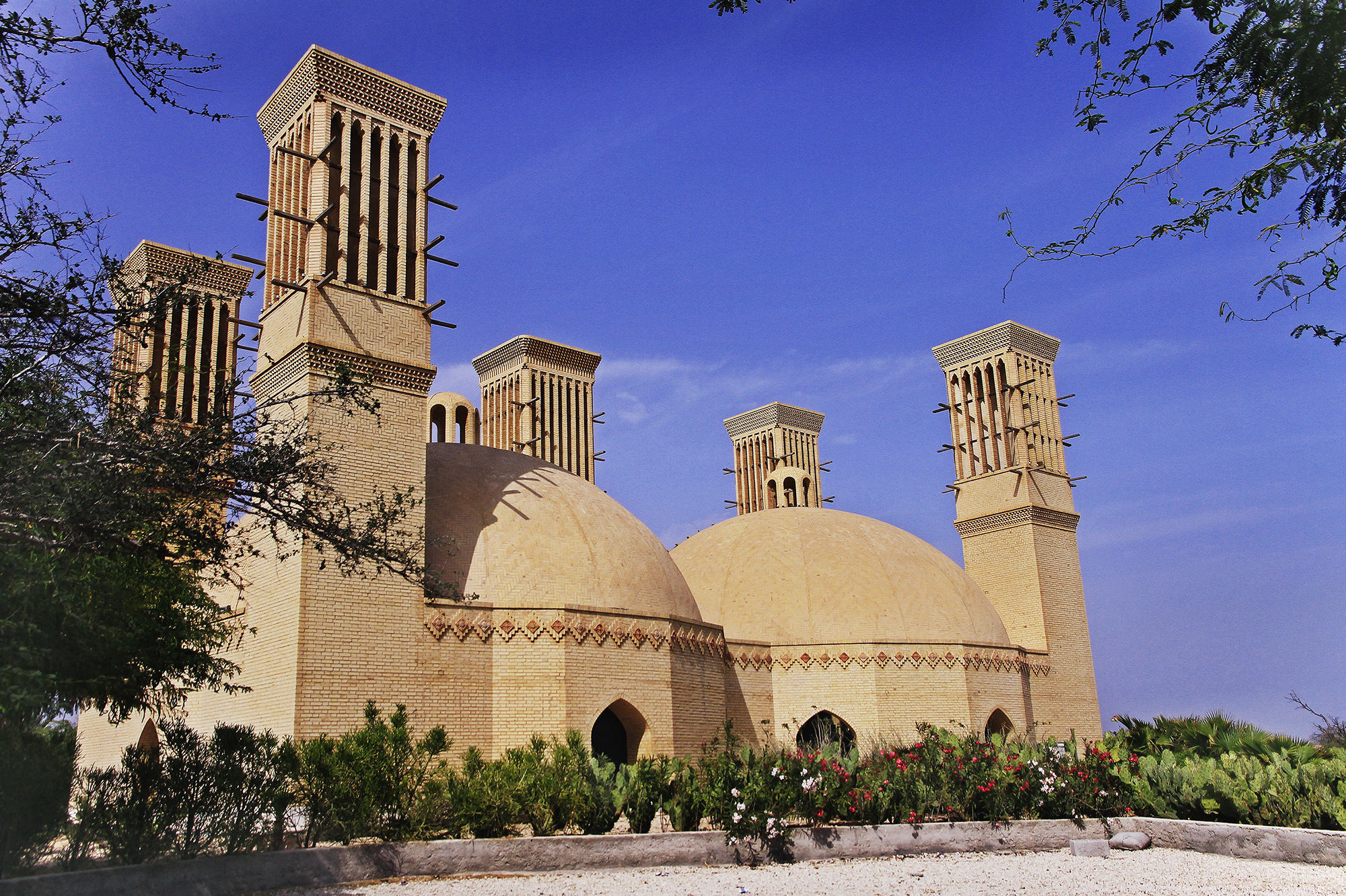
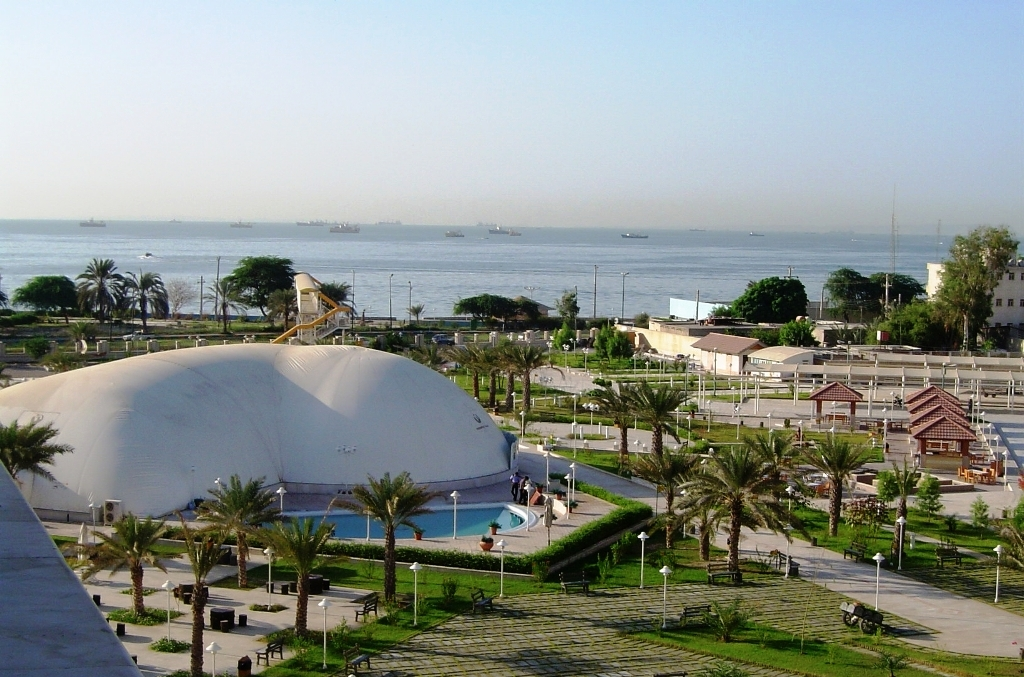
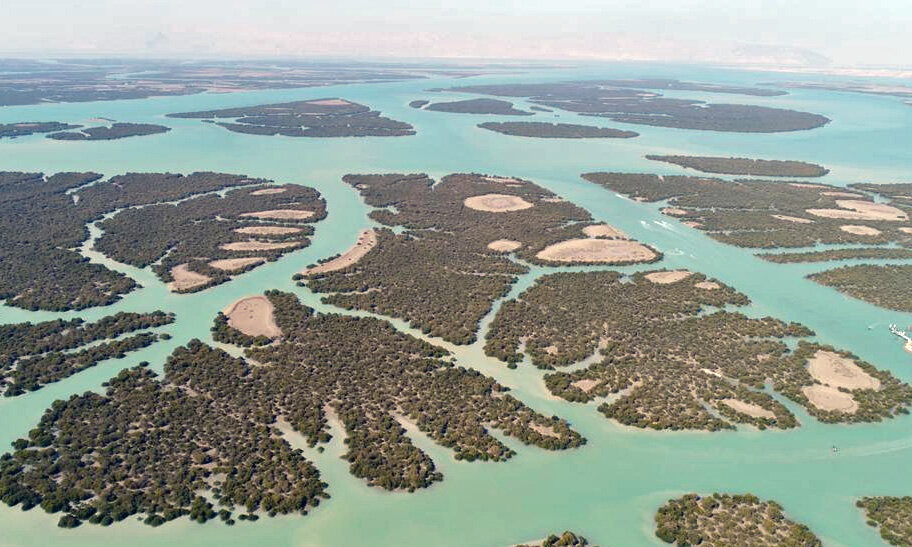
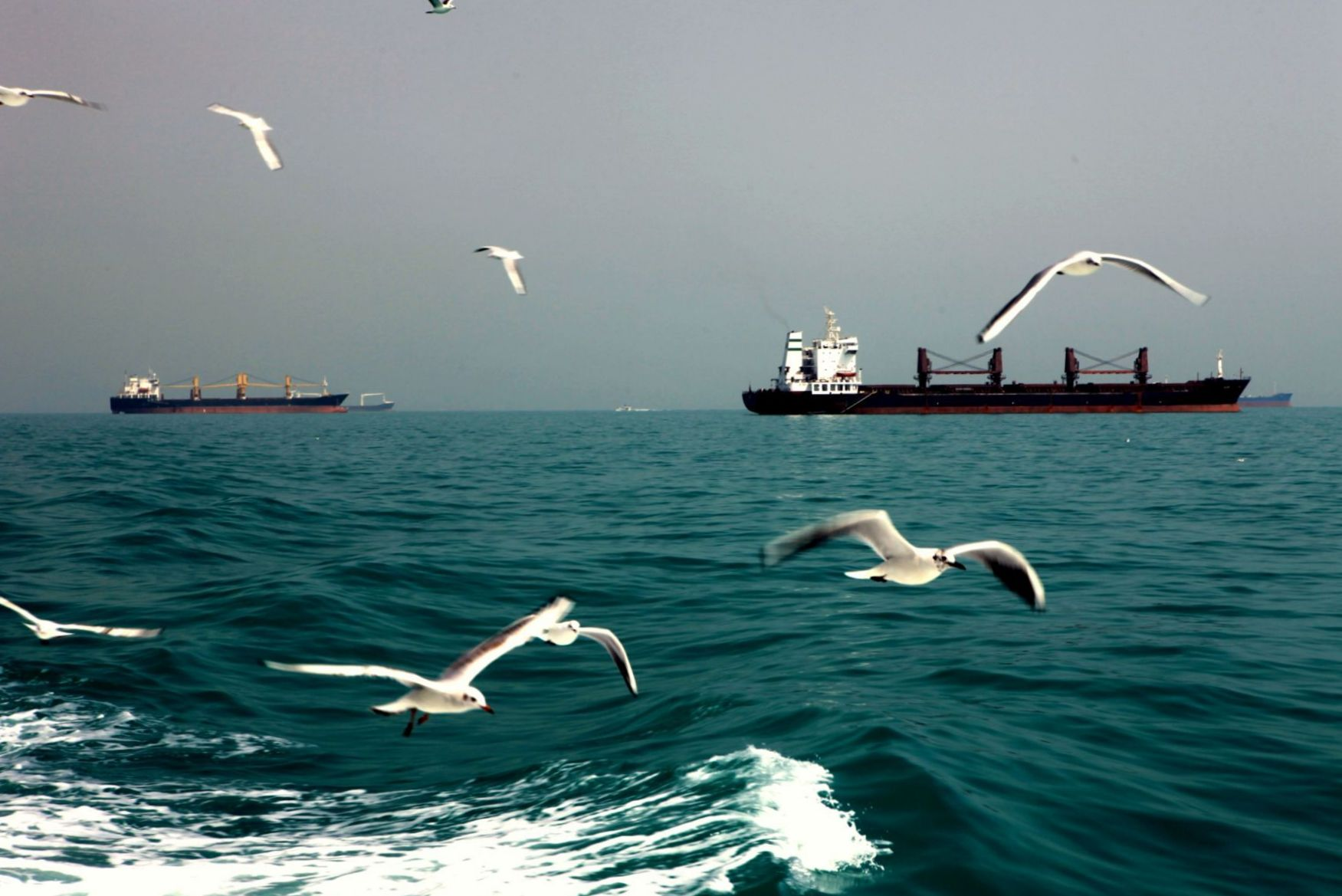
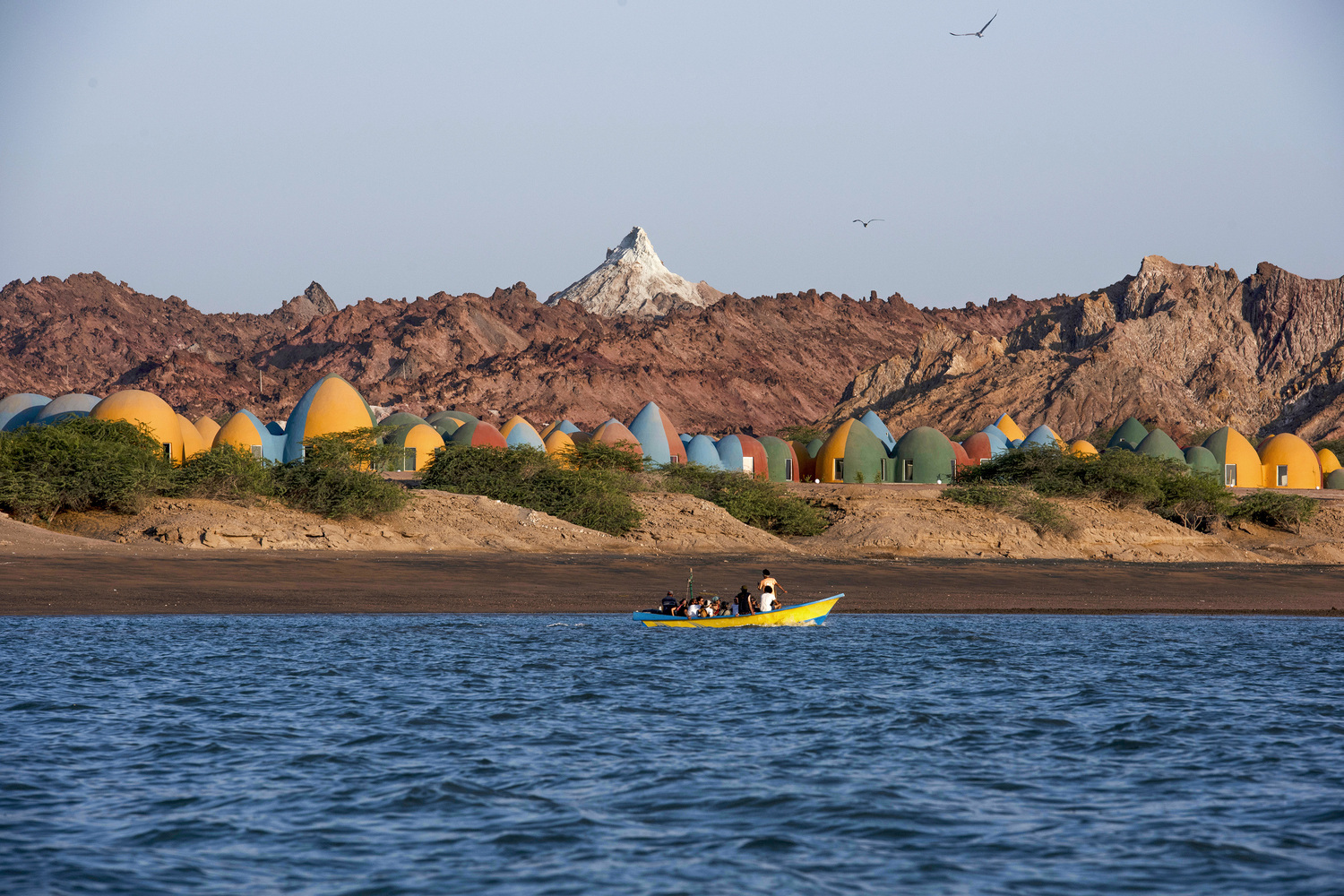
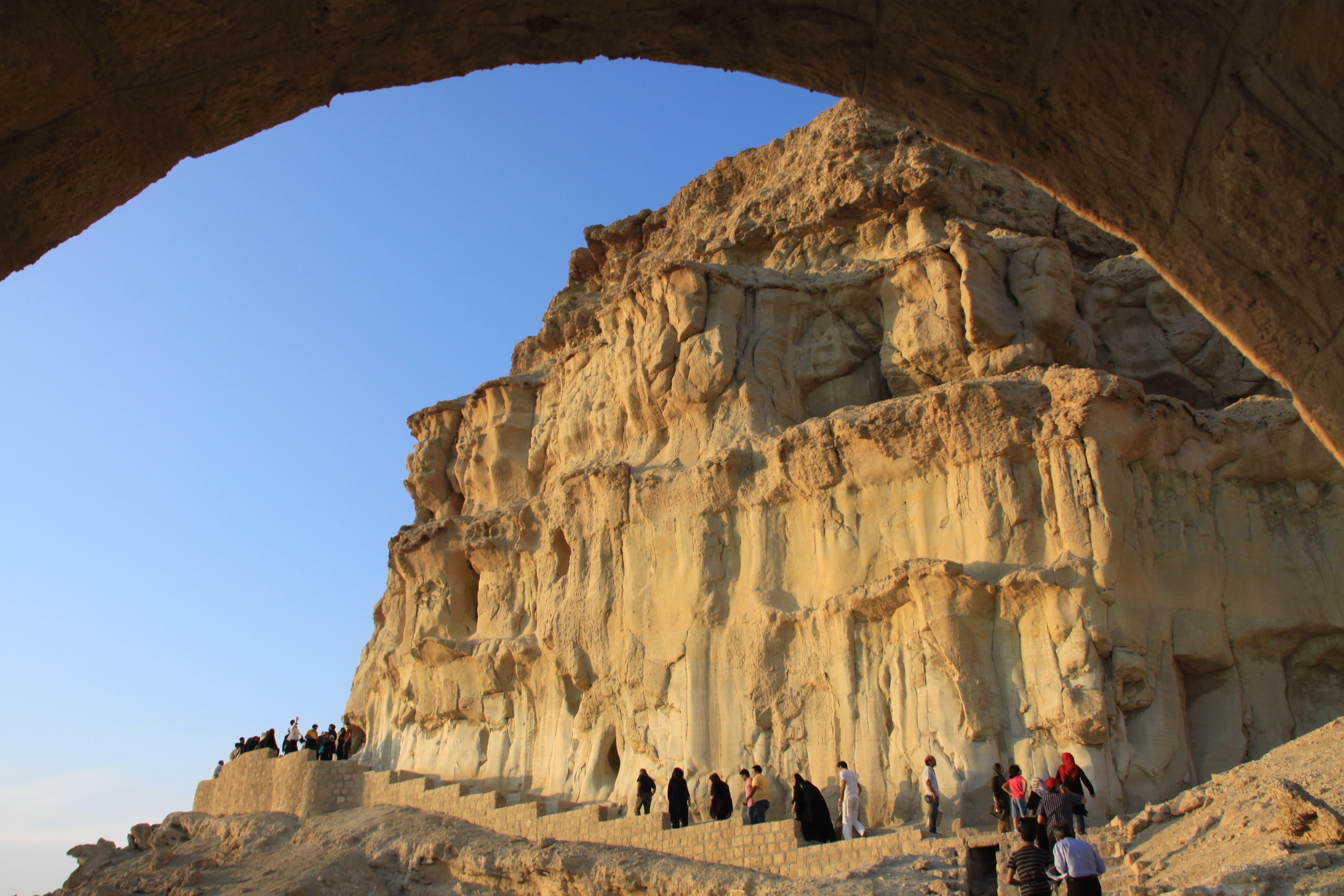

- Map of Iran with Hormozgan province highlighted
- Coordinates: 27°06′N 56°00′E
- Country: Iran
- Region: Region 2
- Capital: Bandar Abbas
- Counties: 13

Government
  - Governor-general: Mohammad Ashouri Taziani (Independent)

Area
  - Total: 70,697 km^{2} (27,296 sq mi)

Population (2016)
  - Total: 1,776,415
  - Density: 25.127/km^{2} (65.079/sq mi)
- Time zone: UTC+3:30 (IRST)
- ISO 3166 code: IR-22
- Main language(s): Mostly Southwestern Iranian Persian varieties like Garmsiri, a minority speaks Balochi and Gulf Arabic
- HDI (2017): 0.768 high · 25th

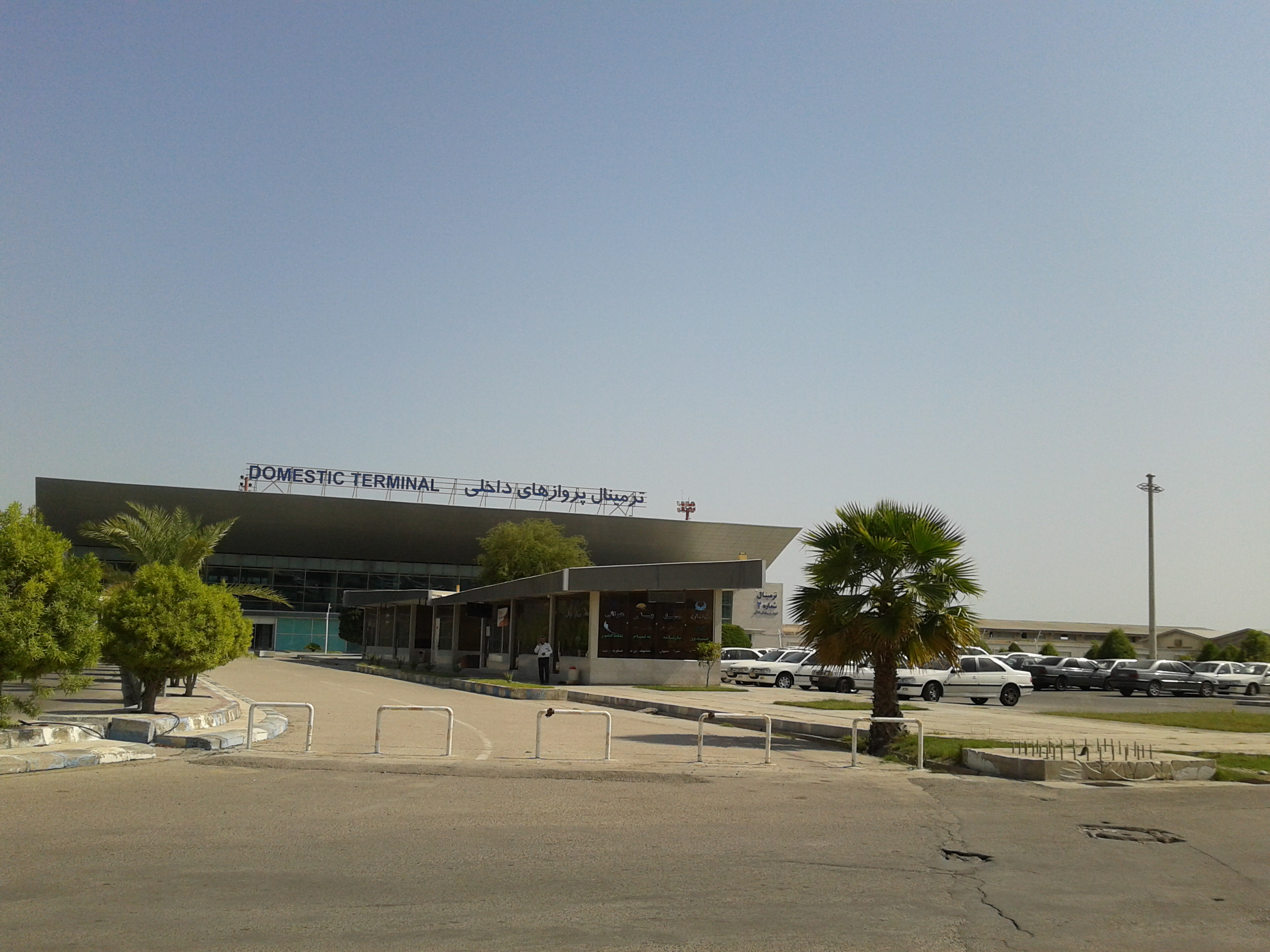
Bandar Abbas International Airport

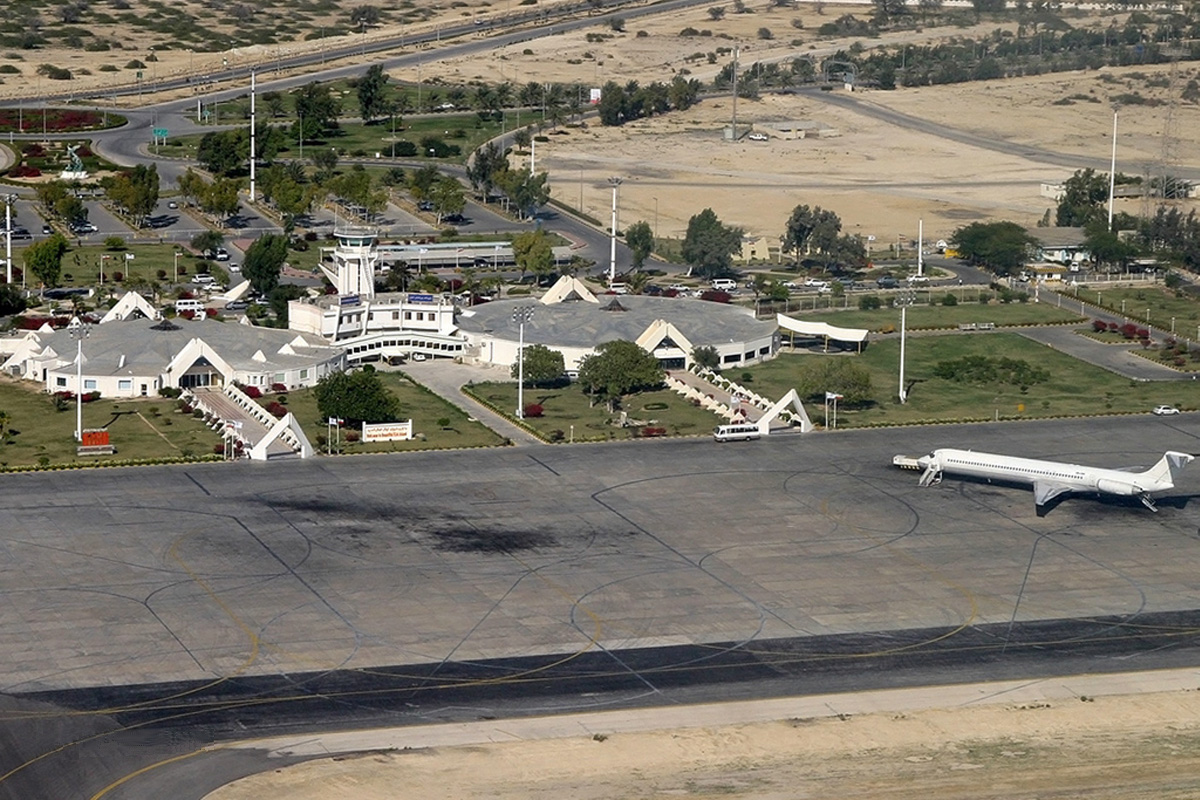
Kish International Airport

Hormozgan province (Persian: استان هرمزگان) (Note: Also romanized as Ostān-e Hormozgān, classically Harmozeia) is one of the 31 provinces of Iran. Its capital is the city of Bandar Abbas.

The province is in the south of the country, in Iran's Region 2 facing Oman, the United Arab Emirates, and the Strait of Hormuz. Its area is 70,697 km^{2} (27,296 sq mi). The province has 14 islands in the Persian Gulf and 1,000 km (620 mi) of coastline.

== History ==
Although Hormozgan is known to have been settled during the Achaemenid era when Nearchus passed through the region, recorded history of the main port of Hormozgan (Bandar‑e Hormoz) begins with Ardashir I of Persia of the Sassanid empire.

The province is said to have been particularly prosperous between 241 BC and 211 BC, but retained a lack of significance with the beginning of the Islamic era.

Marco Polo visited the port of Bandar Abbas in 1272 and 1293. He reported trading in Persian jewelry, ivory and silk of Indochina, and pearls from Bahrain in the bazaar of the port of Hormuz.

In 1497 Europeans landed in the region for the first time, headed by Vasco da Gama. In 1508 the Portuguese, led by Afonso de Albuquerque anchored in the area with seven warships, as part of protecting their interests in Egypt and Venice. The fishing port of Hormuz at the time was considered strategically positioned for commercial interests in the Persian Gulf.

Ismail I who was trying to counter the Ottoman Empire to the west, was unable to save the port from the Portuguese, until Shah Abbas I was finally able to drive them out of the Persian Gulf with the aid of the British. The name of Bandar Abbas comes directly from the name of Shah Abbas I.

The British, meanwhile, were competing for influence in the region with Dutch colonialists, who developed Qeshm Island and dispatched warships to Bandar Abbas to get wet during the final years of Shah Abbas' reign. The British government was unable to defend itself against this attack. With the souring of British and Dutch relations, military tensions grew further in the region. The Dutch finally resorted to moving their base up to Kharg Island.

The Amir of Kharg, Mir Mahna Baloch and Mir Hammal Kalmati with Baloch army expelled the Europeans from Bander Abbas to Karachi, so with the Dutch and other forces at Kharg, the British were firmly in charge of the entire region. Soon Britain took control over the entire Persian Gulf via the British East India Company. The British adopted policy encouraging local autonomy throughout the Persian Gulf to in order to prevent a formidable unified force from threatening their establishments in the gulf. The Omani Emirate of Hormuz later joined a federated Persia.

The strategic importance of the Persian Gulf further increased after World War I with the discovery of oil in the region.

== Demographics ==
=== Languages ===
Hormozgan is dominated by a variety of Persian language. Northwest Iranian Balochi is present as well. Arabic, a Semitic language, and Kholosi, an Indic language, are also found among a minority of speakers within the province.

Hormozgan Linguistic Composition
language	percent
Bandari Persian	59.25%
New Persian	12.26%
Larestani Persian	8.72%
Balochi	7.31%
Other, Unknown, mixed	7.27%
Arabic	2.00%
Bashkardi Persian	1.63%
Fars Group (Persian)	1.55%

=== Population ===
At the time of the 2006 National Census, the province's population was 136,537 people in 30,332 households. There were 157,818 inhabitants in 39,692 households at the following census of 2011. The 2016 census measured the population of the province as 177,641 in 49,366 households.

=== Administrative divisions ===

The population history and structural changes of Hormozgan province's administrative divisions over three consecutive censuses are shown in the following table.

Hormozgan province
Counties	2006	2011	2016
Abumusa	186	526	740
Bandar Abbas	49,864	58,828	68,036
Bandar Lengeh	11,362	13,471	15,935
Bashagard (Note: Separated from Jask County after the 2006 census)	—	4,000	3,508
Bastak	6,571	8,011	8,049
Hajjiabad	6,244	6,588	6,962
Jask	7,576	5,288	5,888
Khamir	4,754	5,296	5,614
Minab	25,430	23,570	25,922
Parsian	3,736	4,284	5,059
Qeshm	10,388	11,777	14,899
Rudan	10,422	11,854	12,452
Sirik (Note: Separated from Minab County after the 2006 census)	—	4,318	4,572
Total	136,537	157,818	177,641

=== Cities ===
According to the 2016 census, 97,665 people (nearly 55% of the population of Hormozgan province) live in the following cities:

City	Population
Abu Musa	4,213
Bandar Abbas	526,664
Bandar Charak	406
Bandar Khamir	2015
Bandar Lengeh	3,043
Bastak	995
Bika	719
Dargahan	1,452
Dashti	469
Fareghan	177
Fin	393
Garuk	400
Gowharan	117
Hajjiabad	2,897
Hasht Bandi	671
Hormuz	589
Jask	1,686
Jenah	691
Kish	39,853
Kong	1,921
Kuhestak	306
Kushk-e Nar	326
Lamazan	274
Minab	7,317
Parsian	1,804
Qaleh Qazi	528
Qeshm	40,678
Rudan	3,612
Ruydar	655
Sardasht	172
Sar-e Gaz-e Ahmadi	115
Senderk	191
Sirik	513
Suza	570
Takht	308
Tazian-e Pain	426
Tirur	487
Ziarat-e Ali	267

=== Most populous cities ===
The following table lists the most populous cities in Hormozgan:

Rank	City	County	Population
1	Bandar Abbas	Bandar Abbas	52,664
2	Minab	Minab	7,317
3	Qeshm	Qeshm	4,067
4	Kish	Bandar Lengeh	3,985
5	Rudan	Rudan	3,612
6	Bandar Lengeh	Bandar Lengeh	3,043
7	Hajjiabad	Hajjiabad	2,897
8	Kong	Bandar Lengeh	1,921
9	Parsian	Parsian	1,804
10	Jask	Jask	1,686

== Geography and climate ==
The province is primarily mountainous, consisting of the southern tip of the Zagros Range. The province experiences a very hot and humid climate, with temperatures sometimes exceeding 120 °F (49 °C) in summers. There is very little precipitation year-round.

== Hormozgan today ==
Hormozgan today has 11 ports, five air strips, and three national airports. The province has an active agriculture sector, ranking first in Iran in lime production and second in date production. 30% of Iran's fishery produce comes from this province. Three major hydro dams serve the water needs of the province – Esteghlal Dam (i.e., Minab Dam, which supplies major part of consuming water of the Bandar Abbas), Jegin Dam, and Shemil Dam.

Germany has recently offered to build a bridge that would connect Qeshm island to the mainland.

Hormozgan has two free trade zones, one in Kish, the other on Qeshm island. Kish Island, situated in a free-trade zone, is home of the Iranian oil bourse (one of five exchanges of its kind in the world, and the only one explicitly not trading oil and derivatives in U.S. dollars).

On July 18, 2026, a United States airstrike struck a water desalination plant in the village of Bunji, Hormozgan province. The attack disabled the facility, cutting off the drinking water supply to twenty nearby villages and leaving an estimated 10,000 residents without access to potable water, according to Iranian provincial officials.

== Attractions ==
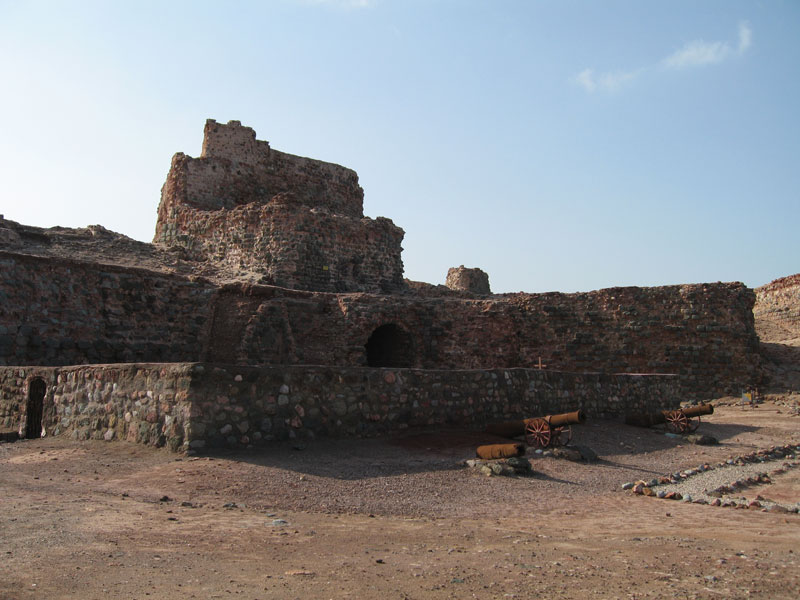
The Fort of Our Lady of the Conception, Hormoz Island, Iran

The Cultural Heritage Organization of Iran lists 212 sites of historical and cultural significance in the province. Some of the more popular attractions are:

- Emarat-e Kolah Farangi (built by and during the Dutch occupation)
- Berkeh haye Baran (six traditional water reservoirs)
- Gele-dari traditional bath
- A Hindu temple
- Latidan Bridge, built during the era of Shah Abbas I
- Fekri House
- Sa'di House
- Fort of Our Lady of the Conception in Hormoz island
- Qeshm Island
- Hara marine forests
- Kish Island, the most popular tourist resort in southern Iran in the Persian Gulf
- Geno UNESCO natural biosphere reserve
- Hara UNESCO natural biosphere reserve
- Various hot springs

== Colleges and universities ==
- Bandar Abbas University of Medical Sciences
- University of Hormozgan
- Qeshm Institute of Higher Education
- Islamic Azad University of Bandar Abbas
- Payame Noor University of Hormozgan
- Islamic Azad University of Roudan
- Kish University

== See also ==
- Bandar Abbas
- Bastak
- Khayyam gas field
- Kookherd
- Maghoh
- Mir-Mahna (video game)
- Morbagh
- Ormus
- Ifra Hormizd
- The Historic Bath of Siba – An ancient bath house that is believed dated back to the Sassanid dynasty.

Media related to Hormozgan Province at Wikimedia Commons
