= Poshtkuh =

Poshtkuh or Posht-e Kuh or Posht Kuh or Posht Kooh (Persian: پشتكوه) may refer to:

- Poshtkuh, Fars
- Posht-e Kuh, Hormozgan
- Poshtkuh-e Abdan, Hormozgan Province
- Poshtkuh-e Chakuy, Hormozgan Province
- Poshtkuh, Anbarabad, Kerman Province
- Poshtkuh, Rafsanjan, Kerman Province
- Posht Kuh, Kohgiluyeh and Boyer-Ahmad
- Poshtkuh, Markazi
- Poshtkuh District, in Fars Province
- Poshtkuh-e Mugui Rural District, in Isfahan Province
- Poshtkuh-e Shamil (Persian: پشتکوه شمیل), a region in Bandar Abbas county, Hormozgan province
- Poshtkuh-e Maru, Hormozgan, in Latidan rural district, Hormozgan province

== See also ==
- Poshtkuh Rural District (disambiguation)
