= Jaghin =

Jaghin (Persian: جغین) may refer to:

- Jaghin, Hajjiabad
- Jaghin, Rudan
- Jaghin District
- Jaghin-e Jonubi Rural District
- Jaghin-e Shomali Rural District

== See also ==
- Jaghan (disambiguation)
