= Sar Godar =

Sar Godar or Sargodar (Persian: سرگدار) may refer to:

- Sargodar-e Kalatu, Hormozgan Province
- Sar Godar, Jiroft, Kerman Province
- Sar Godar, Rigan, Kerman Province
- Sar Godar, Razavi Khorasan
