= Kahnshuiyeh =

Village in Hormozgan province, Iran

Kahnshuiyeh Persian: كهنشوييه
- Village
- Location within Iran
- Coordinates: 27°20′27″N 57°12′22″E
- Country: Iran
- Province: Hormozgan
- County: Rudan
- District: Bikah
- Rural District: Bikah

Population (2016)
  - Total: 1,068
- Time zone: UTC+3:30 (IRST)

Kahnshuiyeh (Persian: كهنشوييه) (Note: Also romanized as Kahnshū’īyeh and Kohneshū’īyeh; also known as Kahn Gashū’īyeh, Kahngeshū’īyeh, and Kohneh Shū’īyeh) is a village in, and the capital of, Bikah Rural District of Bikah District, Rudan County, Hormozgan province, Iran. The previous capital of the rural district was the village of Bikah, now a city.

== Demographics ==
=== Population ===
At the time of the 2006 National Census, the village's population was 1,013 in 205 households, when it was in Berentin Rural District. The following census in 2011 counted 1,139 people in 308 households. The 2016 census measured the population of the village as 1,068 people in 313 households.

After the 2016 census, the village was transferred to Bikah Rural District.
