= Sar Kahnan =

Sar Kahnan or Sarkahnan (Persian: سركهنان) may refer to:

- Sar Kahnan, Bikah, Hormozgan Province
- Sar Kahnan, Rudkhaneh, Hormozgan Province
- Sarkahnan-e Davari, Hormozgan Province
- Sarkahnan, Kerman
