= Deh Tuk =

Deh Tuk دهتوك
- Village
- Location within Iran
- Coordinates: 27°34′21″N 57°11′05″E
- Country: Iran
- Province: Hormozgan
- County: Rudan
- Bakhsh: Central
- Rural District: Rahdar

Population (2006)
  - Total: 22
- Time zone: UTC+3:30 (IRST)
  - Summer (DST): UTC+4:30 (IRDT)

Deh Tuk (Persian: دهتوك, also Romanized as Deh Tūk; also known as Deh Tūg) is a village in Rahdar Rural District, in the Central District of Rudan County, Hormozgan Province, Iran. At the 2006 census, its population was 22, in 7 families.
