= Tang-e Rud =

Tang-e Rud or Tang Rud (Persian: تنگ رود) may refer to:

- Tang Rud, Gilan
- Tang-e Rud, Hormozgan
- Tang Rud, Kohgiluyeh and Boyer-Ahmad
