= Chil Naban =

Chil Naban چيل نبان
- Village
- Location within Iran
- Coordinates: 27°46′46″N 57°08′29″E
- Country: Iran
- Province: Hormozgan
- County: Rudan
- Bakhsh: Rudkhaneh
- Rural District: Mosaferabad

Population (2006)
  - Total: 83
- Time zone: UTC+3:30 (IRST)
  - Summer (DST): UTC+4:30 (IRDT)

Chil Naban (Persian: چيل نبان, also Romanized as Chīl Nabān; also known as Chīl Banān) is a village in Mosaferabad Rural District, Rudkhaneh District, Rudan County, Hormozgan Province, Iran. At the 2006 census, its population was 83, in 17 families.
