= Band-e Heydar Abbas =

Band-e Heydar Abbas بندحيدرعباس
- Village
- Country: Iran
- Province: Hormozgan
- County: Rudan
- Bakhsh: Rudkhaneh
- Rural District: Mosaferabad

Population (2006)
  - Total: 31
- Time zone: UTC+3:30 (IRST)
  - Summer (DST): UTC+4:30 (IRDT)

Band-e Heydar Abbas (Persian: بندحيدرعباس, also Romanized as Band-e Ḩeydar ‘Abbās) is a village in Mosaferabad Rural District, Rudkhaneh District, Rudan County, Hormozgan Province, Iran. At the 2006 census, its population was 31, in 6 families.
