= Gereshmu =

Gereshmu گرشمو
- Village
- Location within Iran
- Coordinates: 27°23′23″N 57°18′57″E
- Country: Iran
- Province: Hormozgan
- County: Rudan
- Bakhsh: Central
- Rural District: Abnama

Population (2006)
  - Total: 45
- Time zone: UTC+3:30 (IRST)
  - Summer (DST): UTC+4:30 (IRDT)

Gereshmu (Persian: گرشمو, also Romanized as Gereshmū) is a village in Abnama Rural District, in the Central District of Rudan County, Hormozgan Province, Iran. At the 2006 census, its population was 45, in 8 families.
