= Dehliyan =

Dehliyan دهليان
- Village
- Location within Iran
- Coordinates: 27°44′13″N 57°14′35″E
- Country: Iran
- Province: Hormozgan
- County: Rudan
- Bakhsh: Rudkhaneh
- Rural District: Rudkhaneh

Population (2006)
  - Total: 107
- Time zone: UTC+3:30 (IRST)
  - Summer (DST): UTC+4:30 (IRDT)

Dehliyan (Persian: دهليان, also Romanized as Dehlīyān) is a village in Rudkhaneh Rural District, Rudkhaneh District, Rudan County, Hormozgan Province, Iran. At the 2006 census, its population was 107, in 23 families.
