= Ab Tarikan-e Pain =

Ab Tarikan-e Pain آب تاريكان پايين
- Village
- Location within Iran
- Coordinates: 27°44′07″N 57°12′51″E
- Country: Iran
- Province: Hormozgan
- County: Rudan
- Bakhsh: Rudkhaneh
- Rural District: Rudkhaneh

Population (2006)
  - Total: 182
- Time zone: UTC+3:30 (IRST)
  - Summer (DST): UTC+4:30 (IRDT)

Ab Tarikan-e Pain (Persian: آب تاريكان پايين, also Romanized as Āb Tārīkān-e Pā’īn) is a village in Rudkhaneh Rural District, Rudkhaneh District, Rudan County, Hormozgan province, Iran. At the 2006 census, its population was 182, in 38 families.
