= Mosaferabad =

Mosaferabad مسافراباد
- Village
- Location within Iran
- Coordinates: 27°48′31″N 57°12′39″E
- Country: Iran
- Province: Hormozgan
- County: Rudan
- Bakhsh: Rudkhaneh
- Rural District: Mosaferabad

Government
  - President: Hassan Rouhani

Area
  - Total: 5 km^{2} (1.9 sq mi)

Population (2006)
  - Total: 117
  - Density: 23/km^{2} (61/sq mi)
- Time zone: UTC+3:30 (IRST)

Mosaferabad (Persian: مسافراباد, also Romanized as Mosāferābād; also known as Moz̧affarābād, Muzaffarābād, and Muzffarābād) is a village in Mosaferabad Rural District, Rudkhaneh District, Rudan County, Hormozgan Province, Iran. At the 2006 census, its population was 117, in 29 families.

== Nearby villages ==
Name	Distance
Gorāzābād	.9 km
Mīān Chīlān	1.7 km
Rostamābād	1.7 km
