= Ab Gazan =

Ab Gazan اب گزان
- Village
- Location within Iran
- Coordinates: 27°33′39″N 57°18′48″E
- Country: Iran
- Province: Hormozgan
- County: Rudan
- Bakhsh: Central
- Rural District: Abnama

Population (2006)
  - Total: 131
- Time zone: UTC+3:30 (IRST)
  - Summer (DST): UTC+4:30 (IRDT)

Ab Gazan (Persian: اب گزان, also Romanized as Āb Gazān; also known as Ābgazān-e Pākūh, Āb Gazān Pākū, and Ab Gozān Pākū) is a village in Abnama Rural District, in the Central District of Rudan County, Hormozgan Province, Iran. At the 2006 census, its population was 131, in 31 families.
