= Qalaman =

Qalaman قلمان
- Village
- Location within Iran
- Coordinates: 27°46′31″N 57°09′22″E
- Country: Iran
- Province: Hormozgan
- County: Rudan
- Bakhsh: Rudkhaneh
- Rural District: Mosaferabad

Population (2006)
  - Total: 157
- Time zone: UTC+3:30 (IRST)
  - Summer (DST): UTC+4:30 (IRDT)

Qalaman (Persian: قلمان, also Romanized as Qalamān) is a village in Mosaferabad Rural District, Rudkhaneh District, Rudan County, Hormozgan Province, Iran. At the 2006 census, its population was 157, in 36 families.
