= Sarjuiyeh =

Sarjuiyeh سرجوييه
- Village
- Location within Iran
- Coordinates: 27°26′15″N 57°14′24″E
- Country: Iran
- Province: Hormozgan
- County: Rudan
- Bakhsh: Central
- Rural District: Abnama

Population (2006)
  - Total: 3,230
- Time zone: UTC+3:30 (IRST)
  - Summer (DST): UTC+4:30 (IRDT)

Sarjuiyeh (Persian: سرجوييه, also Romanized as Sarjū’īyeh and Sar Joo’eyeh; also known as Sarjū’īyeh-ye Bālā) is a village in Abnama Rural District, in the Central District of Rudan County, Hormozgan Province, Iran. At the 2006 census, its population was 3,230, in 695 families.
