= Bash Kardan =

Bash Kardan بشكاردان
- Village
- Location within Iran
- Coordinates: 27°34′53″N 57°12′12″E
- Country: Iran
- Province: Hormozgan
- County: Rudan
- Bakhsh: Central
- Rural District: Rahdar

Population (2006)
  - Total: 88
- Time zone: UTC+3:30 (IRST)
  - Summer (DST): UTC+4:30 (IRDT)

Bash Kardan (Persian: بشكاردان, also Romanized as Bash Kārdān; also known as Bash Kārdān-e Sarūk) is a village in Rahdar Rural District, in the Central District of Rudan County, Hormozgan Province, Iran. At the 2006 census, its population was 88, in 24 families.
