= Deh Matun =

Deh Matun ده ماتون
- Village
- Location within Iran
- Coordinates: 27°30′29″N 57°17′54″E
- Country: Iran
- Province: Hormozgan
- County: Rudan
- Bakhsh: Central
- Rural District: Abnama

Population (2006)
  - Total: 330
- Time zone: UTC+3:30 (IRST)
  - Summer (DST): UTC+4:30 (IRDT)

Deh Matun (Persian: ده ماتون, also Romanized as Deh Mātūn; also known as Deh Mātān) is a village in Abnama Rural District, in the Central District of Rudan County, Hormozgan Province, Iran. At the 2006 census, its population was 330, in 77 families.
