= Nozok =

Nozok نزك
- Village
- Location within Iran
- Coordinates: 27°19′30″N 57°12′53″E
- Country: Iran
- Province: Hormozgan
- County: Rudan
- Bakhsh: Bikah
- Rural District: Berentin

Population (2006)
  - Total: 326
- Time zone: UTC+3:30 (IRST)
  - Summer (DST): UTC+4:30 (IRDT)

Nozok (Persian: نزك; also known as Nozūk) is a village in Berentin Rural District, Bikah District, Rudan County, Hormozgan Province, Iran. At the 2006 census, its population was 326, in 69 families.
