= Zard-e Sham =

Zard-e Sham زردشمع
- Village
- Location within Iran
- Coordinates: 27°11′56″N 57°15′16″E
- Country: Iran
- Province: Hormozgan
- County: Rudan
- Bakhsh: Jaghin
- Rural District: Jaghin-e Jonubi

Population (2006)
  - Total: 308
- Time zone: UTC+3:30 (IRST)
  - Summer (DST): UTC+4:30 (IRDT)

Zard-e Sham (Persian: زردشمع) is a village in Jaghin-e Jonubi Rural District, Jaghin District, Rudan County, Hormozgan Province, Iran. At the 2006 census, its population was 308, in 58 families.
