= Gaz Azar =

Gaz Azar گزازار
- Village
- Location within Iran
- Coordinates: 27°38′27″N 57°13′52″E
- Country: Iran
- Province: Hormozgan
- County: Rudan
- Bakhsh: Central
- Rural District: Rahdar

Population (2006)
  - Total: 26
- Time zone: UTC+3:30 (IRST)
  - Summer (DST): UTC+4:30 (IRDT)

Gaz Azar (Persian: گزازار, also Romanized as Gaz Āzār; also known as Gaz Āzār-e Pā’īn) is a village in Rahdar Rural District, in the Central District of Rudan County, Hormozgan Province, Iran. At the 2006 census, its population was 26, in 5 families.
