= Kari Dazan-e Pain =

Kari Dazan-e Pain كرئ دازان پايين
- Village
- Country: Iran
- Province: Hormozgan
- County: Rudan
- Bakhsh: Central
- Rural District: Rahdar

Population (2006)
  - Total: 20
- Time zone: UTC+3:30 (IRST)
  - Summer (DST): UTC+4:30 (IRDT)

Kari Dazan-e Pain (Persian: كرئ دازان پايين, also Romanized as Karī Dāzān-e Pā’īn) is a village in Rahdar Rural District, in the Central District of Rudan County, Hormozgan Province, Iran. At the 2006 census, its population was 20, in 5 families.
