= Band-e Nowruz =

Band-e Nowruz بندنوروز
- Village
- Location within Iran
- Coordinates: 27°43′06″N 57°14′12″E
- Country: Iran
- Province: Hormozgan
- County: Rudan
- Bakhsh: Rudkhaneh
- Rural District: Rudkhaneh

Population (2006)
  - Total: 44
- Time zone: UTC+3:30 (IRST)
  - Summer (DST): UTC+4:30 (IRDT)

Band-e Nowruz (Persian: بندنوروز, also Romanized as Band-e Nowrūz) is a village in Rudkhaneh Rural District, Rudkhaneh District, Rudan County, Hormozgan Province, Iran. At the 2006 census, its population was 44, in 12 families.
