= Deh Gin =

Deh Gin ده گين
- Village
- Location within Iran
- Coordinates: 27°45′57″N 57°11′43″E
- Country: Iran
- Province: Hormozgan
- County: Rudan
- Bakhsh: Rudkhaneh
- Rural District: Mosaferabad

Population (2006)
  - Total: 107
- Time zone: UTC+3:30 (IRST)
  - Summer (DST): UTC+4:30 (IRDT)

Deh Gin (Persian: ده گين, also Romanized as Deh Gīn) is a village in Mosaferabad Rural District, Rudkhaneh District, Rudan County, Hormozgan Province, Iran. At the 2006 census, its population was 107, in 24 families.
