= Al-e Mahmudi =

Al-e Mahmudi آل محمودی
- Village
- Location within Iran
- Coordinates: 27°37′23″N 57°05′45″E
- Country: Iran
- Province: Hormozgan
- County: Rudan
- Bakhsh: Central
- Rural District: Rahdar

Population (2006)
  - Total: 58
- Time zone: UTC+3:30 (IRST)
  - Summer (DST): UTC+4:30 (IRDT)

Al-e Mahmudi (Persian: آل محمودی, also Romanized as Āl-e Maḩmūdī; also known as Āl-e Maḩmūd) is a village in Rahdar Rural District, in the Central District of Rudan County, Hormozgan Province, Iran. At the 2006 census, its population was 58, in 12 families.
