= Shahrak-e Sizadehaban =

Shahrak-e Sizadehaban شهرك سيزده ابان
- Village
- Location within Iran
- Coordinates: 27°27′19″N 57°15′13″E
- Country: Iran
- Province: Hormozgan
- County: Rudan
- Bakhsh: Central
- Rural District: Abnama

Population (2006)
  - Total: 937
- Time zone: UTC+3:30 (IRST)
  - Summer (DST): UTC+4:30 (IRDT)

Shahrak-e Sizadehaban (Persian: شهرك سيزده ابان, also Romanized as Shahrak-e Sīzadehābān; also known as Poshteh-ye Banān (Persian: پشته بنان) and Poshtehbanān) is a village in Abnama Rural District, in the Central District of Rudan County, Hormozgan Province, Iran. At the 2006 census, its population was 937, in 205 families.
