= Kari Dazan =

Kari Dazan كري دازان
- Village
- Location within Iran
- Coordinates: 27°34′39″N 57°09′37″E
- Country: Iran
- Province: Hormozgan
- County: Rudan
- Bakhsh: Central
- Rural District: Rahdar

Population (2006)
  - Total: 23
- Time zone: UTC+3:30 (IRST)
  - Summer (DST): UTC+4:30 (IRDT)

Kari Dazan (Persian: كري دازان, also Romanized as Karī Dāzān; also known as Kowrīderāzun) is a village in Rahdar Rural District, in the Central District of Rudan County, Hormozgan Province, Iran. At the 2006 census, its population was 23, in 4 families.
