= Deh Kar =

Deh Kar دهكار
- Village
- Location within Iran
- Coordinates: 27°31′26″N 57°14′40″E
- Country: Iran
- Province: Hormozgan
- County: Rudan
- Bakhsh: Central
- Rural District: Abnama

Population (2006)
  - Total: 15
- Time zone: UTC+3:30 (IRST)
  - Summer (DST): UTC+4:30 (IRDT)

Deh Kar (Persian: دهكار, also Romanized as Deh Kār; also known as Deh Kār-e Bālā) is a village in Abnama Rural District, in the Central District of Rudan County, Hormozgan Province, Iran. At the 2006 census, its population was 15, in 6 families.
