= Samilan =

Samilan سميلان
- Village
- Location within Iran
- Coordinates: 27°34′31″N 57°19′42″E
- Country: Iran
- Province: Hormozgan
- County: Rudan
- Bakhsh: Central
- Rural District: Abnama

Population (2006)
  - Total: 133
- Time zone: UTC+3:30 (IRST)

Samilan (Persian: سميلان, also Romanized as Samīlān) is a village in Abnama Rural District, in the Central District of Rudan County, Hormozgan Province, Iran. At the 2006 census, its population was 133, in 28 families.
