= Mian Yili =

Mian Yili ميان يلي
- Village
- Location within Iran
- Coordinates: 27°51′02″N 57°15′37″E
- Country: Iran
- Province: Hormozgan
- County: Rudan
- Bakhsh: Rudkhaneh
- Rural District: Rudkhaneh Bar

Population (2006)
  - Total: 48
- Time zone: UTC+3:30 (IRST)
  - Summer (DST): UTC+4:30 (IRDT)

Mian Yili (Persian: ميان يلي, also Romanized as Mīān Yīlī; also known as Mīyānpulī) is a village in Rudkhaneh Bar Rural District, Rudkhaneh District, Rudan County, Hormozgan Province, Iran. At the 2006 census, its population was 48, in 11 families.
