= Kar Gazi =

Kar Gazi كرگزي
- Village
- Location within Iran
- Coordinates: 27°47′09″N 57°08′11″E
- Country: Iran
- Province: Hormozgan
- County: Rudan
- Bakhsh: Rudkhaneh
- Rural District: Mosaferabad

Population (2006)
  - Total: 127
- Time zone: UTC+3:30 (IRST)
  - Summer (DST): UTC+4:30 (IRDT)

Kar Gazi (Persian: كرگزي, also Romanized as Kār Gazī; also known as Par Gazī and Por Gazī) is a village in Mosaferabad Rural District, Rudkhaneh District, Rudan County, Hormozgan Province, Iran. At the 2006 census, its population was 127, in 29 families.
