= Pirui =

Pirui پيروئي
- Village
- Location within Iran
- Coordinates: 27°44′07″N 57°14′28″E
- Country: Iran
- Province: Hormozgan
- County: Rudan
- Bakhsh: Rudkhaneh
- Rural District: Rudkhaneh

Population (2006)
  - Total: 108
- Time zone: UTC+3:30 (IRST)
  - Summer (DST): UTC+4:30 (IRDT)

Pirui (Persian: پيروئي, also Romanized as Pīrū’ī) is a village in Rudkhaneh Rural District, Rudkhaneh District, Rudan County, Hormozgan Province, Iran. At the 2006 census, its population was 108, in 23 families.
