= Naserabad, Hormozgan =

Naserabad ناصراباد
- Village
- Location within Iran
- Coordinates: 27°12′35″N 57°24′05″E
- Country: Iran
- Province: Hormozgan
- County: Rudan
- Bakhsh: Jaghin
- Rural District: Jaghin-e Jonubi

Population (2006)
  - Total: 1,050
- Time zone: UTC+3:30 (IRST)
  - Summer (DST): UTC+4:30 (IRDT)

Naserabad (Persian: ناصراباد, also Romanized as Nāşerābād) is a village in Jaghin-e Jonubi Rural District, Jaghin District, Rudan County, Hormozgan Province, Iran. At the 2006 census, its population was 1,050, in 234 families.
