= Chah Nuri =

Chah Nuri چاه نوري
- Village
- Location within Iran
- Coordinates: 27°48′26″N 57°10′39″E
- Country: Iran
- Province: Hormozgan
- County: Rudan
- Bakhsh: Rudkhaneh
- Rural District: Mosaferabad

Population (2006)
  - Total: 98
- Time zone: UTC+3:30 (IRST)
  - Summer (DST): UTC+4:30 (IRDT)

Chah Nuri (Persian: چاه نوري, also Romanized as Chāh Nūrī) is a village in Mosaferabad Rural District, Rudkhaneh District, Rudan County, Hormozgan Province, Iran. At the 2006 census, its population was 98, in 23 families.
