= Bagh Narges =

Bagh Narges باغ نرگس
- Village
- Location within Iran
- Coordinates: 27°47′20″N 57°15′06″E
- Country: Iran
- Province: Hormozgan
- County: Rudan
- Bakhsh: Rudkhaneh
- Rural District: Rudkhaneh Bar

Population (2006)
  - Total: 280
- Time zone: UTC+3:30 (IRST)
  - Summer (DST): UTC+4:30 (IRDT)

Bagh Narges (Persian: باغ نرگس, also Romanized as Bāgh Narges; also known as Bāgh Nargesān) is a village in Rudkhaneh Bar Rural District, Rudkhaneh District, Rudan County, Hormozgan Province, Iran. At the 2006 census, its population was 280, in 71 families.
