= Deh Pirangan-e Bala =

Village in Hormozgan, Iran

Deh Pirangan-e Bala ده پيرنگان بالا
- Village
- Location within Iran
- Coordinates: 27°44′35″N 57°09′58″E
- Country: Iran
- Province: Hormozgan
- County: Rudan
- Bakhsh: Rudkhaneh
- Rural District: Mosaferabad

Population (2006)
  - Total: 91
- Time zone: UTC+3:30 (IRST)
  - Summer (DST): UTC+4:30 (IRDT)

Deh Pirangan-e Bala (Persian: ده پيرنگان بالا, also Romanized as Deh Pīrangān-e Bālā) is a village in Mosaferabad Rural District, Rudkhaneh District, Rudan County, Hormozgan Province, Iran. As of the 2006 census, its population was 91, in 23 families.
