= Sorkh Dan =

Sorkh Dan سرخ دان
- Village
- Location within Iran
- Coordinates: 27°12′42″N 57°21′12″E
- Country: Iran
- Province: Hormozgan
- County: Rudan
- Bakhsh: Jaghin
- Rural District: Jaghin-e Shomali

Population (2006)
  - Total: 809
- Time zone: UTC+3:30 (IRST)
  - Summer (DST): UTC+4:30 (IRDT)

Sorkh Dan (Persian: سرخ دان, also Romanized as Sorkh Dān and Sorkhdān) is a village in Jaghin-e Shomali Rural District, Jaghin District, Rudan County, Hormozgan Province, Iran. According to the 2006 census, its official total population was 809 people, spread across 164 discrete families.
