= Gandar-e Pain =

Gandar-e Pain گاندرپائين
- Village
- Location within Iran
- Coordinates: 27°38′48″N 57°14′19″E
- Country: Iran
- Province: Hormozgan
- County: Rudan
- Bakhsh: Central
- Rural District: Rahdar

Population (2006)
  - Total: 209
- Time zone: UTC+3:30 (IRST)
  - Summer (DST): UTC+4:30 (IRDT)

Gandar-e Pain (Persian: گاندرپائين, also Romanized as Gāndar-e Pā’īn) is a village in Rahdar Rural District, in the Central District of Rudan County, Hormozgan Province, Iran. At the 2006 census, its population was 209, in 37 families.
