= Rahbaran =

Rahbaran رهبران
- Village
- Location within Iran
- Coordinates: 27°43′43″N 57°15′46″E
- Country: Iran
- Province: Hormozgan
- County: Rudan
- Bakhsh: Rudkhaneh
- Rural District: Rudkhaneh

Population (2006)
  - Total: 208
- Time zone: UTC+3:30 (IRST)
  - Summer (DST): UTC+4:30 (IRDT)

Rahbaran (Persian: رهبران, also Romanized as Rahbarān) is a village in Rudkhaneh Rural District, Rudkhaneh District, Rudan County, Hormozgan Province, Iran. At the 2006 census, its population was 208, in 43 families.
