= Dasht-e Zagh-e Abdan =

Dasht-e Zagh-e Abdan دشت زاغ ابدان
- Village
- Location within Iran
- Coordinates: 27°45′57″N 57°17′43″E
- Country: Iran
- Province: Hormozgan
- County: Rudan
- Bakhsh: Rudkhaneh
- Rural District: Rudkhaneh Bar

Population (2006)
  - Total: 399
- Time zone: UTC+3:30 (IRST)
  - Summer (DST): UTC+4:30 (IRDT)

Dasht-e Zagh-e Abdan (Persian: دشت زاغ ابدان, also Romanized as Dasht-e Zāgh-e Ābdān) is a village in Rudkhaneh Bar Rural District, Rudkhaneh District, Rudan County, Hormozgan Province, Iran. At the 2006 census, its population was 399, in 94 families.
