= Bikah =

Bikah (Persian: بيكاه) may refer to:

- Bikah, Iran
- Bikah District
- Bikah Rural District
