= Kharbechgan =

Kharbechgan خاربچگان
- Village
- Location within Iran
- Coordinates: 27°34′34″N 57°03′12″E
- Country: Iran
- Province: Hormozgan
- County: Rudan
- Bakhsh: Central
- Rural District: Rahdar

Population (2006)
  - Total: 82
- Time zone: UTC+3:30 (IRST)
  - Summer (DST): UTC+4:30 (IRDT)

Kharbechgan (Persian: خاربچگان, also Romanized as Khārbechgān; also known as Khārbejgān) is a village in Rahdar Rural District, in the Central District of Rudan County, Hormozgan Province, Iran. At the 2006 census, its population was 82, in 22 families.
