= Gish =

Gish may refer to:

== Arts and entertainment ==
- Gish (album), 1991 album by Smashing Pumpkins
- Gish (video game), an action computer game released in 2004
- Gish Prize, an artistic prize first given in 1994

== People ==
- Gish (surname), includes a list of people with the name
  - Annabeth Gish (born 1971), American actress
  - Lilian Gish (1893–1993), American actress
- Gish Jen (born 1956), American writer

== Places ==
- Gish station, a light-rail station in San Jose, California
- Gish Abay, an Ethiopian town
- Gish Bar Patera, a crater on Jupiter's moon Io
- Gishi, Nagorno-Karabakh, a village in Azerbaijan
- Poshteh-ye Gish, a village in Hormozgan, Iran

== Other uses ==
- Great Gish, war god of the Kafir people of Hindu Kush
- GISH, an annual international scavenger hunt, formerly known as GISHWHES
- Use of the gish gallop or gishing tactic in debate

== See also ==
- Kish (disambiguation)
- Kiş (disambiguation)
