= Barezard =

Borzard برزرد
- Village
- Location within Iran
- Coordinates: 27°39′40″N 57°12′04″E
- Country: Iran
- Province: Hormozgan
- County: Rudan
- Bakhsh: Central
- Rural District: Rahdar

Population (2006)
  - Total: 46
- Time zone: UTC+3:30 (IRST)
  - Summer (DST): UTC+4:30 (IRDT)

Borzard (Persian: برزرد) (means yellow hill and named due to a yellow hill which is located in the entrance of this village), is a village in Rahdar Rural District, in the Central District of Rudan County, Hormozgan Province, Iran. At the 2006 census, its population was 46, in 12 families.
