= Aliabad, Jaghin =

Aliabad علي اباد
- Village
- Location within Iran
- Coordinates: 27°08′00″N 57°27′00″E
- Country: Iran
- Province: Hormozgan
- County: Rudan
- Bakhsh: Jaghin
- Rural District: Jaghin-e Jonubi

Population (2006)
  - Total: 146
- Time zone: UTC+3:30 (IRST)
  - Summer (DST): UTC+4:30 (IRDT)

Aliabad (Persian: علي اباد, also Romanized as ‘Alīābād; also known as Bashāgardīyehā (Persian: بشاگرديها) and Alīābād-e Hashtbandī) is a village in Jaghin-e Jonubi Rural District, Jaghin District, Rudan County, Hormozgan Province, Iran. At the 2006 census, its population was 146, in 36 families.
