= Pasefid =

Pasefid پا سفيد
- Village
- Location within Iran
- Coordinates: 27°13′00″N 57°19′34″E
- Country: Iran
- Province: Hormozgan
- County: Rudan
- Bakhsh: Jaghin
- Rural District: Jaghin-e Shomali

Population (2006)
  - Total: 1,041
- Time zone: UTC+3:30 (IRST)
  - Summer (DST): UTC+4:30 (IRDT)

Pasefid (Persian: پا سفيد, also Romanized as Pāsefīd) is a village in Jaghin-e Shomali Rural District, Jaghin District, Rudan County, Hormozgan Province, Iran. At the 2006 census, its population was 1,041, in 213 families.
