= Limui =

Limui ليموئي
- Village
- Location within Iran
- Coordinates: 27°50′45″N 57°17′01″E
- Country: Iran
- Province: Hormozgan
- County: Rudan
- Bakhsh: Rudkhaneh
- Rural District: Rudkhaneh Bar

Population (2006)
  - Total: 106
- Time zone: UTC+3:30 (IRST)
  - Summer (DST): UTC+4:30 (IRDT)

Limui (Persian: ليموئي, also Romanized as Līmū’ī) is a village in Rudkhaneh Bar Rural District, Rudkhaneh District, Rudan County, Hormozgan Province, Iran. At the 2006 census, its population was 106, in 24 families.
