= Tareh-ye Ashayiri =

Tareh-ye Ashayiri طرح عشايري
- Village
- Country: Iran
- Province: Hormozgan
- County: Rudan
- Bakhsh: Rudkhaneh
- Rural District: Rudkhaneh Bar

Population (2006)
  - Total: 19
- Time zone: UTC+3:30 (IRST)
  - Summer (DST): UTC+4:30 (IRDT)

Tareh-ye Ashayiri (Persian: طرح عشايري, also Romanized as Ţareḥ-ye ʿAshāyīrī) is a village in Rudkhaneh Bar Rural District, Rudkhaneh District, Rudan County, Hormozgan Province, Iran. At the 2006 census, its population was 19, in 5 families.
