= Musa Ali =

Musa Ali موسي علي
- Village
- Location within Iran
- Coordinates: 27°49′48″N 57°16′43″E
- Country: Iran
- Province: Hormozgan
- County: Rudan
- Bakhsh: Rudkhaneh
- Rural District: Rudkhaneh Bar

Population (2006)
  - Total: 82
- Time zone: UTC+3:30 (IRST)
  - Summer (DST): UTC+4:30 (IRDT)

Musa Ali (Persian: موسي علي, also Romanized as Mūsá ‘Alī) is a village in Rudkhaneh Bar Rural District, Rudkhaneh District, Rudan County, Hormozgan Province, Iran. At the 2006 census, its population was 82, in 20 families.
