= Chil Gongan =

Chil Gongan چيل گنگان
- Village
- Location within Iran
- Coordinates: 27°47′39″N 57°15′06″E
- Country: Iran
- Province: Hormozgan
- County: Rudan
- Bakhsh: Rudkhaneh
- Rural District: Rudkhaneh Bar
- Religion: Batuchan

Population (2006)
  - Total: 80
- Time zone: UTC+3:30 (IRST)
  - Summer (DST): UTC+4:30 (IRDT)

Chil Gongan (Persian: چيل گنگان, also Romanized as Chīl Gongān; also known as Chīleh Gongon) is a village in Rudkhaneh Bar Rural District, Rudkhaneh District, Rudan County, Hormozgan Province, Iran. At the 2006 census, its population was 80, in 20 families.
