= Bagh Shah, Hormozgan =

Bagh Shah باغ شاه
- Village
- Location within Iran
- Coordinates: 27°51′30″N 57°16′24″E
- Country: Iran
- Province: Hormozgan
- County: Rudan
- Bakhsh: Rudkhaneh
- Rural District: Rudkhaneh Bar

Population (2006)
  - Total: 233
- Time zone: UTC+3:30 (IRST)
  - Summer (DST): UTC+4:30 (IRDT)

Bagh Shah (Persian: باغ شاه, also Romanized as Bāgh Shāh) is a village in Rudkhaneh Bar Rural District, Rudkhaneh District, Rudan County, Hormozgan Province, Iran. At the 2006 census, its population was 233, in 49 families.
