= Chah Seyfollah =

Chah Seyfollah چاه سيف اله
- Village
- Location within Iran
- Coordinates: 27°50′23″N 57°15′23″E
- Country: Iran
- Province: Hormozgan
- County: Rudan
- Bakhsh: Rudkhaneh
- Rural District: Rudkhaneh Bar

Population (2006)
  - Total: 77
- Time zone: UTC+3:30 (IRST)
  - Summer (DST): UTC+4:30 (IRDT)

Chah Seyfollah (Persian: چاه سيف اله, also Romanized as Chāh Seyfollāh) is a village in Rudkhaneh Bar Rural District, Rudkhaneh District, Rudan County, Hormozgan Province, Iran. At the 2006 census, its population was 77, in 15 families.
