= Panhar =

Panhar پانهر
- Village
- Location within Iran
- Coordinates: 27°19′53″N 57°12′57″E
- Country: Iran
- Province: Hormozgan
- County: Rudan
- Bakhsh: Bikah
- Rural District: Berentin

Population (2006)
  - Total: 783
- Time zone: UTC+3:30 (IRST)
  - Summer (DST): UTC+4:30 (IRDT)

Panhar (Persian: پانهر, also Romanized as Pānhar; also known as Pānar) is a village in Berentin Rural District, Bikah District, Rudan County, Hormozgan Province, Iran. At the 2006 census, its population was 783, in 168 families.
