= Berentin =

Village in Hormozgan province, Iran

Berentin Persian: برنطين
- Village
- Location within Iran
- Coordinates: 27°17′01″N 57°13′11″E
- Country: Iran
- Province: Hormozgan
- County: Rudan
- District: Central
- Rural District: Berentin

Area
  - Total: 1,400 km^{2} (540 sq mi)

Population (2016)
  - Total: 5,799
  - Density: 4.1/km^{2} (11/sq mi)
- Time zone: UTC+3:30 (IRST)
- Area code: 0768

Berentin (Persian: برنطين) (Note: Also romanized as Berenţīn) is a village in, and the capital of, Berentin Rural District of the Central District of Rudan County, Hormozgan province, Iran.

== Demographics ==
=== Population ===
At the time of the 2006 National Census, the village's population was 4,971 in 1,002 households, when it was in Bikah District. The following census in 2011 counted 5,344 people in 1,381 households. The 2016 census measured the population of the village as 5,799 people in 1,652 households. It was the most populous village in its rural district.

In 2019, the rural district was separated from the district to join the Central District.
