= Siah Moghan-e Pain =

Siah Moghan-e Pain سياه مغان پائين
- Village
- Location within Iran
- Coordinates: 27°38′02″N 57°13′18″E
- Country: Iran
- Province: Hormozgan
- County: Rudan
- Bakhsh: Central
- Rural District: Rahdar

Population (2006)
  - Total: 70
- Time zone: UTC+3:30 (IRST)
  - Summer (DST): UTC+4:30 (IRDT)

Siah Moghan-e Pain (Persian: سياه مغان پائين, also Romanized as Sīāh Moghān-e Pā’īn) is a village in Rahdar Rural District, in the Central District of Rudan County, Hormozgan Province, Iran. At the 2006 census, its population was 70, in 18 families.
