= Palur, Rudan =

Village in Hormozgan province, Iran

Palur Persian: پالور
- Village
- Location within Iran
- Coordinates: 27°11′23″N 57°20′51″E
- Country: Iran
- Province: Hormozgan
- County: Rudan
- District: Jaghin
- Rural District: Jaghin-e Jonubi

Population (2016)
  - Total: 1,370
- Time zone: UTC+3:30 (IRST)

Palur (Persian: پالور) (Note: Also romanized as Pālūr) is a village in, and the capital of, Jaghin-e Jonubi Rural District of Jaghin District, Rudan County, Hormozgan province, Iran.

== Demographics ==
=== Population ===
At the time of the 2006 National Census, the village's population was 1,017 in 202 households. The following census in 2011 counted 1,347 people in 316 households. The 2016 census measured the population of the village as 1,370 people in 360 households. It was the most populous village in its rural district.
