= Faryab, Rudan =

Village in Hormozgan province, Iran

Faryab Persian: فارياب
- Village
- Location within Iran
- Coordinates: 27°28′13″N 57°04′57″E
- Country: Iran
- Province: Hormozgan
- County: Rudan
- District: Central
- Rural District: Faryab

Population (2016)
  - Total: 1,146
- Time zone: UTC+3:30 (IRST)

Faryab (Persian: فارياب) (Note: Also romanized as Fāryāb) is a village in, and the capital of, Faryab Rural District of the Central District of Rudan County, Hormozgan province, Iran. The previous capital of the rural district was the village of Bikah, now a city.

== Demographics ==
=== Population ===
At the time of the 2006 National Census, the village's population was 1,526 in 309 households. The following census in 2011 counted 993 people in 252 households. The 2016 census measured the population of the village as 1,146 people in 334 households. It was the most populous village in its rural district.
