= Gorun (disambiguation) =

Gorun may refer to:

- Gorun, a village in Shabla Municipality, Dobrich Province, northeastern Bulgaria
- Gorun, a village in Oniceni, Neamţ County, Romania
- Kameh Gorun, village in Rudan County, Hormozgan Province, Iran

== Given name ==
- Rodion Doru Gorun Cămătaru, Romanian footballer

== See also ==
- Goruni (disambiguation)
- Gorunești (disambiguation)
- Goruna, a village in Cocorăştii Mislii commune in Prahova County, Romania
- Gorunaka, a village in the Etropole commune in Bulgaria - see Etropole
