= Poshtkuh-e Chakuy =

Poshtkuhe Chakuy پشتكوه چكوئ
- Village
- Country: Iran
- Province: Hormozgan
- County: Rudan
- Bakhsh: Rudkhaneh
- Rural District: Rudkhaneh

Population (2006)
  - Total: 37
- Time zone: UTC+3:30 (IRST)
  - Summer (DST): UTC+4:30 (IRDT)

Poshtkuhe Chakuy (Persian: پشتكوه چكوئ, also Romanized as Poshtkūh-e Chakūy) is a village in Rudkhaneh Rural District, Rudkhaneh District, Rudan County, Hormozgan Province, Iran. At the 2006 census, its population was 37, in 8 families.
