= Pudanu =

Pudanu پودنو
- Village
- Location within Iran
- Coordinates: 27°24′12″N 57°18′44″E
- Country: Iran
- Province: Hormozgan
- County: Rudan
- Bakhsh: Central
- Rural District: Abnama

Population (2006)
  - Total: 23
- Time zone: UTC+3:30 (IRST)
  - Summer (DST): UTC+4:30 (IRDT)

Pudanu (Persian: پودنو, also Romanized as Pūdanū; also known as Pūdan) is a village in Abnama Rural District, in the Central District of Rudan County, Hormozgan Province, Iran. At the 2006 census, its population was 23, in 5 families.
