= Sargodar-e Kalatu =

Sargodar-e Kalatu سرگداركلاتو
- Village
- Country: Iran
- Province: Hormozgan
- County: Rudan
- Bakhsh: Central
- Rural District: Abnama

Population (2006)
  - Total: 25
- Time zone: UTC+3:30 (IRST)
  - Summer (DST): UTC+4:30 (IRDT)

Sargodar-e Kalatu (Persian: سرگداركلاتو, also Romanized as Sargodār-e Kalātū) is a village in Abnama Rural District, in the Central District of Rudan County, Hormozgan Province, Iran. As of the 2006 census, its population was 25, in 6 families.
