= Pa Kam-e Bala =

Pa Kam-e Bala پاكم بالا
- Village
- Location within Iran
- Coordinates: 27°47′06″N 57°09′20″E
- Country: Iran
- Province: Hormozgan
- County: Rudan
- Bakhsh: Rudkhaneh
- Rural District: Mosaferabad

Population (2006)
  - Total: 21
- Time zone: UTC+3:30 (IRST)
  - Summer (DST): UTC+4:30 (IRDT)

Pa Kam-e Bala (Persian: پاكم بالا, also Romanized as Pā Kam-e Bālā) is a village in Mosaferabad Rural District, Rudkhaneh District, Rudan County, Hormozgan Province, Iran. At the 2006 census, its population was 21, in 5 families.
