= Jaghan =

Jaghan and Jeghan (Persian: جغان) may refer to:

- Jaghan, Bandar Abbas
- Jaghan, Hajjiabad

== See also ==
- Jaghin (disambiguation)
