= Siah Moghan-e Bala =

Siah Moghan-e Bala سياه مغان بالا
- Village
- Location within Iran
- Coordinates: 27°37′48″N 57°13′01″E
- Country: Iran
- Province: Hormozgan
- County: Rudan
- Bakhsh: Central
- Rural District: Rahdar

Population (2006)
  - Total: 74
- Time zone: UTC+3:30 (IRST)
  - Summer (DST): UTC+4:30 (IRDT)

Siah Moghan-e Bala (Persian: سياه مغان بالا, also Romanized as Sīāh Moghān-e Bālā and Sīāh Maghān-e Bālā; also known as Seyān Moghān and Sīāh Moghān) is a village in Rahdar Rural District, in the Central District of Rudan County, Hormozgan Province, Iran. At the 2006 census, its population was 74, in 17 families.
