= Sekal =

Sakol سَكل
- Village
- Location within Iran
- Coordinates: 27°22′11″N 57°10′22″E
- Country: Iran
- Province: Hormozgan
- County: Rudan
- Bakhsh: Bikah
- Rural District: Bikah

Population (2006)
  - Total: 2,051
- Time zone: UTC+3:30 (IRST)
  - Summer (DST): UTC+4:30 (IRDT)

Sakol (Persian: سَكُل, also Romanized as Sekal and Sekol; also known as Seh Gel) is a village in Bikah Rural District, Bikah District, Rudan County, Hormozgan Province, Iran. At the 2006 census, its population was 2,051, in 421 families.
