= Gheybi, Hormozgan =

Gheybi غيبي
- Village
- Location within Iran
- Coordinates: 27°23′38″N 57°14′08″E
- Country: Iran
- Province: Hormozgan
- County: Rudan
- Bakhsh: Central
- Rural District: Abnama

Population (2006)
  - Total: 1,095
- Time zone: UTC+3:30 (IRST)
  - Summer (DST): UTC+4:30 (IRDT)

Gheybi (Persian: غيبي, also Romanized as Gheybī) is a village in Abnama Rural District, in the Central District of Rudan County, Hormozgan Province, Iran. At the 2006 census, its population was 1,095, in 229 families.
