= Sar Gust-e Pain =

Sar Gust-e Pain سرگوست پائين
- Village
- Location within Iran
- Coordinates: 27°46′53″N 57°10′17″E
- Country: Iran
- Province: Hormozgan
- County: Rudan
- Bakhsh: Rudkhaneh
- Rural District: Mosaferabad

Population (2006)
  - Total: 57
- Time zone: UTC+3:30 (IRST)
  - Summer (DST): UTC+4:30 (IRDT)

Sar Gust-e Pain (Persian: سرگوست پائين, also Romanized as Sar Gūst-e Pā’īn; also known as Sar Gasht-e Soflá, Sargosk-e Pā’īn, Sar Gost, and Sar Gost-e Pā’īn) is a village in Mosaferabad Rural District, Rudkhaneh District, Rudan County, Hormozgan Province, Iran. At the 2006 census, its population was 57, in 13 families.
