= Pa Kam-e Pain =

Village in Hormozgan Province, Iran

Pa Kam-e Pain پاكم پائين
- Village
- Location within Iran
- Coordinates: 27°46′54″N 57°09′34″E
- Country: Iran
- Province: Hormozgan
- County: Rudan
- Bakhsh: Rudkhaneh
- Rural District: Mosaferabad

Population (2006)
  - Total: 32
- Time zone: UTC+3:30 (IRST)
  - Summer (DST): UTC+4:30 (IRDT)

Pa Kam-e Pain (Persian: پاكم پائين, also Romanized as Pā Kam-e Pā’īn) is a village in Mosaferabad Rural District, Rudkhaneh District, Rudan County, Hormozgan Province, Iran. At the 2006 census, its population was 32, in 11 families.
