= Ziarat-e Pirchugan =

Village in Hormozgan province, Iran

Ziarat-e Pirchugan Persian: زيارت پيرچوگان
- Village
- Location within Iran
- Coordinates: 27°40′08″N 57°00′26″E
- Country: Iran
- Province: Hormozgan
- County: Rudan
- District: Central
- Rural District: Rahdar

Population (2016)
  - Total: 917
- Time zone: UTC+3:30 (IRST)

Ziarat-e Pirchugan (Persian: زيارت پيرچوگان) (Note: Also romanized as Zīārat-e Pīrchūgān; also known as Zeyārat, Zīārat, and Zīyārat) is a village in Rahdar Rural District of the Central District of Rudan County, Hormozgan province, Iran.

== Demographics ==
=== Population ===
At the time of the 2006 National Census, the village's population was 767 in 176 households. The following census in 2011 counted 995 people in 267 households. The 2016 census measured the population of the village as 917 people in 276 households. It was the most populous village in its rural district.
