= Sar Gust-e Bala =

Sar Gust-e Bala سرگوست بالا
- Village
- Location within Iran
- Coordinates: 27°47′29″N 57°09′32″E
- Country: Iran
- Province: Hormozgan
- County: Rudan
- Bakhsh: Rudkhaneh
- Rural District: Mosaferabad

Population (2006)
  - Total: 268
- Time zone: UTC+3:30 (IRST)
  - Summer (DST): UTC+4:30 (IRDT)

Sar Gust-e Bala (Persian: سرگوست بالا, also Romanized as Sar Gūst-e Bālā; also known as Sar Gasht-e ‘Olyā, Sargosk-e Bālā, Sar Gost, and Sar Gost-e Bālā) is a village in Mosaferabad Rural District, Rudkhaneh District, Rudan County, Hormozgan Province, Iran. At the 2006 census, its population was 268, in 52 families.
