= Sahilan =

Sahilan سهيلان
- Village
- Location within Iran
- Coordinates: 27°34′35″N 57°19′40″E
- Country: Iran
- Province: Hormozgan
- County: Rudan
- Bakhsh: Rudkhaneh
- Rural District: Rudkhaneh

Population (2006)
  - Total: 50
- Time zone: UTC+3:30 (IRST)
  - Summer (DST): UTC+4:30 (IRDT)

Sahilan (Persian: سهيلان, also Romanized as Sahīlān; also known as Samīlān (Persian: سميلان) and Sehmīlān) is a village in Rudkhaneh Rural District, Rudkhaneh District, Rudan County, Hormozgan Province, Iran. At the 2006 census, its population was 50, in 10 families.
