= Samilan-e Bala =

Village in Hormozgan province, Iran

Samilan-e Bala Persian: سميلان بالا
- Village
- Location within Iran
- Coordinates: 27°43′41″N 57°15′43″E
- Country: Iran
- Province: Hormozgan
- County: Rudan
- District: Rudkhaneh
- Rural District: Rudkhaneh

Population (2016)
  - Total: 506
- Time zone: UTC+3:30 (IRST)

Samilan-e Bala (Persian: سميلان بالا) (Note: Also romanized as Samīlān-e Bālā; also known as Samīlān) is a village in Rudkhaneh Rural District of Rudkhaneh District, Rudan County, Hormozgan province, Iran.

== Demographics ==
=== Population ===
At the time of the 2006 National Census, the village's population was 188 in 40 households. The following census in 2011 counted 427 people in 109 households. The 2016 census measured the population of the village as 506 people in 142 households. It was the most populous village in its rural district.
