= Dasht-e Sefa =

Dasht-e Sefa دشت صفا
- Village
- Country: Iran
- Province: Hormozgan
- County: Rudan
- Bakhsh: Bikah
- Rural District: Berentin

Population (2006)
  - Total: 97
- Time zone: UTC+3:30 (IRST)
  - Summer (DST): UTC+4:30 (IRDT)

Dasht-e Sefa (Persian: دشت صفا, also Romanized as Dasht-e Şefā) is a village in Berentin Rural District, Bikah District, Rudan County, Hormozgan Province, Iran. At the 2006 census, its population was 97, in 25 families.
