= Nimeh Kar =

Nimeh Kar or Nimehkar (Persian: نيمه كار) may refer to:

- Nimeh Kar, Khamir, Hormozgan Province
- Nimeh Kar, Rudan, Hormozgan Province
- Nimeh Kar, Kermanshah
