= Kalitu =

Kalitu (Persian: كليتو) may refer to:

- Kalitu, Hormozgan
- Kalitu, Kerman
