= Faryab, Rudkhaneh =

Village in Hormozgan province, Iran

Faryab Persian: فارياب
- Village
- Location within Iran
- Coordinates: 27°49′30″N 57°17′18″E
- Country: Iran
- Province: Hormozgan
- County: Rudan
- District: Rudkhaneh
- Rural District: Rudkhaneh Bar

Population (2016)
  - Total: 1,065
- Time zone: UTC+3:30 (IRST)

Faryab (Persian: فارياب) (Note: Also romanized as Fāryāb and Fārīyāb) is a village in, and the capital of, Rudkhaneh Bar Rural District of Rudkhaneh District, Rudan County, Hormozgan province, Iran.

== Demographics ==
=== Population ===
At the time of the 2006 National Census, the village's population was 664 in 162 households. The following census in 2011 counted 1,094 people in 286 households. The 2016 census measured the population of the village as 1,065 people in 304 households.
