= Nurabad, Rudan =

Village in Hormozgan province, Iran

Nurabad Persian: نوراباد
- Village
- Location within Iran
- Coordinates: 27°46′37″N 57°09′49″E
- Country: Iran
- Province: Hormozgan
- County: Rudan
- District: Rudkhaneh
- Rural District: Mosaferabad

Population (2016)
  - Total: 171
- Time zone: UTC+3:30 (IRST)

Nurabad (Persian: نوراباد) (Note: Also romanized as Nūrābād) is a village in, and the capital of, Mosaferabad Rural District of Rudkhaneh District, Rudan County, Hormozgan province, Iran.

== Demographics ==
=== Population ===
At the time of the 2006 National Census, the village's population was 106 in 25 households. The following census in 2011 counted 191 people in 25 households. The 2016 census measured the population of the village as 171 people in 57 households.
