= Siah Moghan =

Siah Moghan or Seyah Moghan or Siah Maghan (Persian: جغین) may refer to:

- Siah Moghan-e Bala
- Siah Moghan-e Pain
