= Rahdar, Hormozgan =

Village in Hormozgan province, Iran

Rahdar Persian: راهدار
- Village
- Location within Iran
- Coordinates: 27°37′04″N 57°06′10″E
- Country: Iran
- Province: Hormozgan
- County: Rudan
- District: Central
- Rural District: Rahdar

Population (2016)
  - Total: 346
- Time zone: UTC+3:30 (IRST)

Rahdar (Persian: راهدار) (Note: Also romanized as Rāhdār and Rahdār; also known as Rāhdār Godār) is a village in, and the capital of, Rahdar Rural District of the Central District of Rudan County, Hormozgan province, Iran.

== Demographics ==
=== Population ===
At the time of the 2006 National Census, the village's population was 141 in 31 households. The following census in 2011 counted 335 people in 85 households. The 2016 census measured the population of the village as 346 people in 101 households.
