= Qaleh, Hormozgan =

Village in Hormozgan province, Iran

Qaleh Persian: قلعه
- Village
- Location within Iran
- Coordinates: 27°13′01″N 57°22′03″E
- Country: Iran
- Province: Hormozgan
- County: Rudan
- District: Jaghin
- Rural District: Jaghin-e Shomali

Population (2016)
  - Total: 1,373
- Time zone: UTC+3:30 (IRST)

Qaleh (Persian: قلعه) (Note: Also romanized as Qal‘eh) is a village in Jaghin-e Shomali Rural District of Jaghin District, Rudan County, Hormozgan province, Iran.

== Demographics ==
=== Population ===
At the time of the 2006 National Census, the village's population was 1,241 in 271 households. The following census in 2011 counted 1,206 people in 311 households. The 2016 census measured the population of the village as 1,373 people in 387 households. It was the most populous village in its rural district.
