= Sardang-e Komiz =

Sardang-e Komiz سردنگ كميز
- Village
- Location within Iran
- Coordinates: 27°23′18″N 57°13′42″E
- Country: Iran
- Province: Hormozgan
- County: Rudan
- Bakhsh: Central
- Rural District: Abnama

Population (2006)
  - Total: 1,291
- Time zone: UTC+3:30 (IRST)
  - Summer (DST): UTC+4:30 (IRDT)

Sardang-e Komiz (Persian: سردنگ كميز, also Romanized as Sardang-e Komīz; also known as Komīz and Kumiz) is a village in Abnama Rural District, in the Central District of Rudan County, Hormozgan Province, Iran. At the 2006 census, its population was 1,291, in 272 families.
