= Pa Kam =

Pa Kam (Persian: پاكم) may refer to:

- Pa Kam-e Bala
- Pa Kam-e Pain
