= Mohebbi =

Mohebbi (Persian: محبي) may refer to:

== Places ==
- Mohebbi, Rudan, Hormozgan Province, Iran

== People with the surname ==
- Mohammad Hassan Mohebbi, Iranian wrestler
- Mohammad Hossein Mohebbi, Iranian wrestler
- Yadollah Mohebbi, Iranian wrestler
- Afshin Mohebbi, American businessman
