= Khar Posht =

Khar Posht (Persian: خرپشت) may refer to:

- Khar Posht, Isfahan
- Khar Posht, Kerman
