= Sar Kahnan, Bikah =

Sar Kahnan سركهنان
- Village
- Location within Iran
- Coordinates: 27°23′42″N 57°08′10″E
- Country: Iran
- Province: Hormozgan
- County: Rudan
- Bakhsh: Bikah
- Rural District: Bikah

Population (2006)
  - Total: 22
- Time zone: UTC+3:30 (IRST)
  - Summer (DST): UTC+4:30 (IRDT)

Sar Kahnan (Persian: سركهنان, also Romanized as Sar Kahnān) is a village in Bikah Rural District, Bikah District, Rudan County, Hormozgan Province, Iran. At the 2006 census, its population was 22, in 5 families.
