= Mohammadabad, Rudan =

Village in Hormozgan province, Iran

Mohammadabad Persian: محمداباد
- Village
- Location within Iran
- Coordinates: 27°46′20″N 57°12′47″E
- Country: Iran
- Province: Hormozgan
- County: Rudan
- District: Rudkhaneh
- Rural District: Mosaferabad

Population (2016)
  - Total: 535
- Time zone: UTC+3:30 (IRST)

Mohammadabad (Persian: محمداباد) (Note: Also romanized as Moḩammadābād) is a village in Mosaferabad Rural District of Rudkhaneh District, Rudan County, Hormozgan province, Iran.

== Demographics ==
=== Population ===
At the time of the 2006 National Census, the village's population was 363 in 78 households. The following census in 2011 counted 374 people in 100 households. The 2016 census measured the population of the village as 535 people in 152 households. It was the most populous village in its rural district.
