= Kalitu, Hormozgan =

Kalitu كليتو
- Village
- Location within Iran
- Coordinates: 27°47′28″N 57°06′56″E
- Country: Iran
- Province: Hormozgan
- County: Rudan
- Bakhsh: Rudkhaneh
- Rural District: Rudkhaneh Bar

Population (2006)
  - Total: 37
- Time zone: UTC+3:30 (IRST)
  - Summer (DST): UTC+4:30 (IRDT)

Kalitu (Persian: كليتو, also Romanized as Kalītū) is a village in Rudkhaneh Bar Rural District, Rudkhaneh District, Rudan County, Hormozgan Province, Iran. At the 2006 census, its population was 37, in 8 families.
