= Poshtkuh-e Abdan =

Poshtkuh-e Abdan پشت كوه ابدان
- Village
- Location within Iran
- Coordinates: 27°47′04″N 57°18′20″E
- Country: Iran
- Province: Hormozgan
- County: Rudan
- Bakhsh: Rudkhaneh
- Rural District: Rudkhaneh Bar

Population (2006)
  - Total: 137
- Time zone: UTC+3:30 (IRST)
  - Summer (DST): UTC+4:30 (IRDT)

Poshtkuh-e Abdan (Persian: پشت كوه ابدان, also Romanized as Poshtkūh-e Ābdān) is a village in Rudkhaneh Bar Rural District, Rudkhaneh District, Rudan County, Hormozgan Province, Iran. At the 2006 census, its population was 137, in 28 families.
