= Eslamabad, Rudan =

Village in Hormozgan province, Iran

Eslamabad Persian: اسلام اباد
- Village
- Location within Iran
- Coordinates: 27°23′03″N 57°09′44″E
- Country: Iran
- Province: Hormozgan
- County: Rudan
- District: Bikah
- Rural District: Eslamabad

Population (2016)
  - Total: 5,618
- Time zone: UTC+3:30 (IRST)

Eslamabad (Persian: اسلام اباد) (Note: Also romanized as Eslāmābād) is a village in, and the capital of, Eslamabad Rural District of Bikah District, Rudan County, Hormozgan province, Iran.

== Demographics ==
=== Population ===
At the time of the 2006 National Census, the village's population was 4,816 in 997 households, when it was in Bikah Rural District. The following census in 2011 counted 5,247 people in 1,323 households. The 2016 census measured the population of the village as 5,618 people in 1,548 households. It was the most populous village in its rural district.

In 2019, Eslamabad was transferred to Eslamabad Rural District created in Bikah District.
