= Kam Guran =

Kam Guran كم گوران
- Village
- Location within Iran
- Coordinates: 27°51′20″N 57°20′27″E
- Country: Iran
- Province: Hormozgan
- County: Rudan
- Bakhsh: Rudkhaneh
- Rural District: Rudkhaneh Bar

Population (2006)
  - Total: 65
- Time zone: UTC+3:30 (IRST)
  - Summer (DST): UTC+4:30 (IRDT)

Kam Guran (Persian: كم گوران, also Romanized as Kam Gūrān; also known as Kamegoran, Kamegoron, Kameh Gorūn) is a village in Rudkhaneh Bar Rural District, Rudkhaneh District, Rudan County, Hormozgan Province, Iran. At the 2006 census, its population was 65, in 15 families.
