= Kordi Shirazi =

Village in Hormozgan province, Iran

Kordi Shirazi Persian: كردي شيرازي
- Village
- Location within Iran
- Coordinates: 27°47′00″N 57°23′28″E
- Country: Iran
- Province: Hormozgan
- County: Rudan
- District: Rudkhaneh
- Rural District: Rudkhaneh Bar

Population (2016)
  - Total: 2,288
- Time zone: UTC+3:30 (IRST)

Kordi Shirazi (Persian: كردي شيرازي) (Note: Also romanized as Kordī Shīrāzī; also known as Kordī) is a village in Rudkhaneh Bar Rural District of Rudkhaneh District, Rudan County, Hormozgan province, Iran.

== Demographics ==
=== Population ===
At the time of the 2006 National Census, the village's population was 2,178 in 440 households. The following census in 2011 counted 2,197 people in 547 households. The 2016 census measured the population of the village as 2,288 people in 606 households. It was the most populous village in its rural district.
