= Poshteh-ye Gish =

Poshteh-ye Gish پشته گيش
- Village
- Location within Iran
- Coordinates: 27°15′37″N 57°16′05″E
- Country: Iran
- Province: Hormozgan
- County: Rudan
- Bakhsh: Bikah
- Rural District: Berentin

Population (2006)
  - Total: 162
- Time zone: UTC+3:30 (IRST)
  - Summer (DST): UTC+4:30 (IRDT)

Poshteh-ye Gish (Persian: پشته گيش, also Romanized as Poshteh-ye Gīsh) is a village in Berentin Rural District, Bikah District, Rudan County, Hormozgan Province, Iran. At the 2006 census, its population was 162, in 34 families.
