= Nimeh Kar, Rudan =

Nimeh Kar نيمه كار
- Village
- Location within Iran
- Coordinates: 27°44′06″N 57°15′34″E
- Country: Iran
- Province: Hormozgan
- County: Rudan
- Bakhsh: Rudkhaneh
- Rural District: Rudkhaneh

Population (2006)
  - Total: 27
- Time zone: UTC+3:30 (IRST)
  - Summer (DST): UTC+4:30 (IRDT)

Nimeh Kar (Persian: نيمه كار, also Romanized as Nīmeh Kār; also known as Nīmkār) is a village in Rudkhaneh Rural District, Rudkhaneh District, Rudan County, Hormozgan Province, Iran. At the 2006 census, its population was 27, in 7 families.
