= Gheybi =

Gheybi (Persian: غيبي) may refer to:

- Deh-e Gheybi, Razavi Khorasan province
- Gheybi, Hormozgan
- Gheybi, Lorestan
