= Sar Gust =

Sar Gust (Persian: سرگوست), also rendered as Sar Gost, Sargosk, and Sar Gasht, may refer to:

- Sar Gust-e Bala
- Sar Gust-e Pain
