= Bagh Golan =

Bagh Golan (Persian: باغ گلان) may refer to:

- Bagh Golan, Minab
- Bagh Golan, Rudan
