= Tang-e Rud, Hormozgan =

Tang-e Rud تنگ رود
- Village
- Country: Iran
- Province: Hormozgan
- County: Rudan
- Bakhsh: Central
- Rural District: Faryab

Population (2006)
  - Total: 389
- Time zone: UTC+3:30 (IRST)
  - Summer (DST): UTC+4:30 (IRDT)

Tang-e Rud (Persian: تنگ رود, also Romanized as Tang-e Rūd) is a village in Faryab Rural District, in the Central District of Rudan County, Hormozgan Province, Iran. At the 2006 census, its population was 389, from 78 families.
