= Palangan, Hormozgan =

Palangan پلنگان
- Village
- Location within Iran
- Coordinates: 27°18′00″N 57°11′30″E
- Country: Iran
- Province: Hormozgan
- County: Rudan
- Bakhsh: Bikah
- Rural District: Berentin

Population (2006)
  - Total: 25
- Time zone: UTC+3:30 (IRST)
  - Summer (DST): UTC+4:30 (IRDT)

Palangan (Persian: پلنگان, also Romanized as Palangān) is a village in Berentin Rural District, Bikah District, Rudan County, Hormozgan Province, Iran. At the 2006 census, its population was 25, in 6 families.
