= Kiş, Azerbaijan =

Kiş, Azerbaijan may refer to:

- Kiş, Khojavend
- Kiş, Shaki
