= Kharaji =

Kharaji or Kheraji (Persian: خراجي) may refer to:

- Kharaji, Chaharmahal and Bakhtiari
- Kharaji, Hormozgan
