= Sehmi =

Sehmi is an Indian (Ramgarhia) surname which were classified under Backward Class under the reserved category in the both Punjab and Haryana region.

== Notable people ==
- Gursaran Singh Sehmi (1931–2009), Kenyan field hockey player
- Mandip Sehmi (born 1980), British wheelchair rugby player
- Sarabjit Singh Sehmi (born 1963), Kenyan field hockey player
- Satiender Sehmi (born 1954), Kenyan sports shooter
- Ranjit Singh Sehmi (born 1949), Kenyan field hockey player

== See also ==
- Sehmilan
- Ramgarhia
