= Parviz Bahram =

Iranian voice actor

- پرویز بهرام
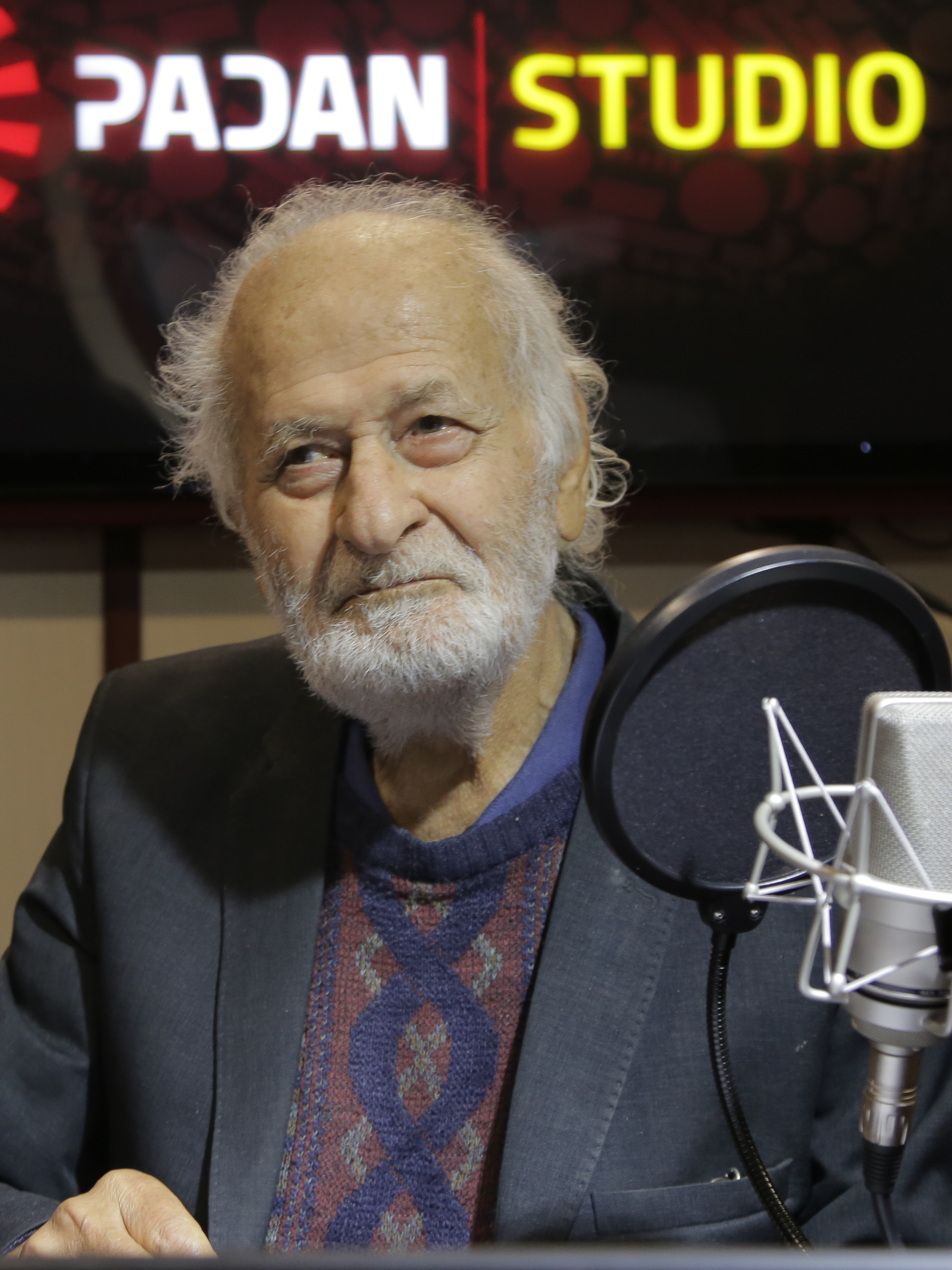
- Bahram in Padan Art Studio, February 30, 2019
- Born: July 26, 1933; Ziarat-e Ali, Tehran
- Died: May 27, 2019 (aged 85); Tehran
- Occupations: Dubber, writer, actor

Parviz Bahram (Persian: پرویز بهرام; b. July 26, 1933 – d. May 26, 2019) was an Iranian voice and theater actor.

== Early life ==
Parviz Bahram was born on 26 July 1933 in Darakhuneh, Tehran. Due to his father's job, he was taken to Babol, where his birth certificate was issued. He lived in the neighborhood of Bisertakieh in Babol for seven years. His father, Ali Akbar Bahram, was an artist in the fields of plastering, mirror work, and sculpture, and some of his works can be found in the Golestan Palace.

== Career ==
Parviz Bahram started voice acting in the late 1940s, participating in the dubbing of an Italian film. He became well-known in Iran as a dubbing actor; one of his best known works was narrating the documentary The Silk Road, which was popular in Iran.

At the beginning of his career, he focused on dubbing instead of taking on lead roles in films. His voice was chosen for the dubbing of the film Othello, for the role of Attila.

Aside from his voice acting work, Bahram was a trained lawyer, working for many years in the field of intellectual property rights.
