= Palangan =

Palangan (Persian: پلنگان) may refer to:

- Palangan, Hormozgan
- Palangan, Kurdistan
