= Kamiz Castle =

Castle in Hormozgan Province, Iran

Kamiz castle
- قلعه کمیز

General information
- Type: Castle
- Location: Rudan County, Iran

Kamiz castle (Persian: قلعه کمیز) is a historical castle located in Rudan County in Hormozgan Province, The longevity of this fortress dates back to the middle of post-Islamic historical periods.
