= Sefa =

Sefa may refer to:

== Given name ==
- John Sefa Ayim, Ghanaian academic
- Orhan Sefa Kilercioğlu, Turkish politician
- Sefa Fatu (born 1993), American professional wrestler also known as Solo Sikoa
- Sefa İşçi (born 1996), Turkish footballer
- Sefa Yılmaz (born 1990), Turkish footballer

== Surname ==
- Cecilia Amoafowaa Sefa (born c. 1983), Ghanaian writer
- Fatjon Sefa (born 1984), Albanian footballer
- Jetmir Sefa (born 1987), Albanian football player
- Nebi Sefa, 19th-century Albanian politician

== Places ==
- Dasht-e Sefa, a village in Berentin Rural District, Bikah District, Rudan County, Hormozgan Province, Iran
- Sefa-utaki, a historical sacred site at Ryukyu Islands in Japan

== Education ==
- Service d'exploitation de la formation aéronautique, former French national flight school

== Other uses ==
- SEFA, a make of backpack industrial breathing set formerly made by Sabre Safety
- Sefa Burnaby Soccer Academy, a Canadian soccer club for youth players in Greater Vancouver
