= Kharaji, Hormozgan =

Village in Hormozgan province, Iran

Kharaji Persian: خراجي
- Village
- Location within Iran
- Coordinates: 27°24′07″N 57°14′23″E
- Country: Iran
- Province: Hormozgan
- County: Rudan
- District: Central
- Rural District: Abnama

Population (2016)
  - Total: 4,712
- Time zone: UTC+3:30 (IRST)

Kharaji (Persian: خراجي) (Note: Also romanized as Kharājī and Kherājī) is a village in, and the capital of, Abnama Rural District of the Central District of Rudan County, Hormozgan province, Iran.

== Demographics ==
=== Population ===
At the time of the 2006 National Census, the village's population was 2,648 in 518 households. The following census in 2011 counted 4,620 people in 1,136 households. The 2016 census measured the population of the village as 4,712 people in 1,320 households. It was the most populous village in its rural district.
