= Gish (surname) =

Gish is a surname. Notable people with the surname include:

- Annabeth Gish (born 1971), American actress
- Dorothy Gish (1898–1968), American actress
- Duane Gish (1921–2013), American biochemist and prominent creationist
- Lillian Gish (1893–1993), American silent film actress
- Lou Gish (1967–2006), British actress
- Oliver Holmes Gish (1883–1987), American geophysicist
- Sheila Gish (1942–2005), British actress
- Sidney Gish (born 1997), American musician
- Warren Gish, American computational biologist

== See also ==
- The Dorothy and Lillian Gish Prize, an artistic prize
- Gish (disambiguation)
