= Sekol =

Sekol may refer to:

- Skou language
- Sekol-ri, North Korea
- Sekol, Iran, a village in Hormozgan Province, Iran
