= Pudan =

Pudan may refer to:

- Dick Pudan (1881–1957), British footballer
- Pudan, Iran, a village in Hormozgan Province, Iran
