= Komiz =

Komiz (Persian: كميز) may refer to:

- Komiz, Hormozgan
- Komiz, Markazi
