= Goruni =

Goruni may refer to several villages in Romania:

- Goruni, a village in Lipnița Commune, Constanța County
- Goruni, a village in Tomești Commune, Iași County

== See also ==
- Gorun (disambiguation)
- Gorunești (disambiguation)
