= Eslamabad Rural District (Rudan County) =

Rural district in Hormozgan province, Iran

Eslamabad Rural District Persian: دهستان اسلام آباد
- Rural District
- Location within Iran
- Coordinates: 27°22′31″N 57°08′01″E
- Country: Iran
- Province: Hormozgan
- County: Rudan
- District: Bikah
- Capital: Eslamabad
- Time zone: UTC+3:30 (IRST)

Eslamabad Rural District (Persian: دهستان اسلام آباد) is in Bikah District of Rudan County, Hormozgan province, Iran. Its capital is the village of Eslamabad, whose population at the time of the 2016 National Census was 5,618 in 1,548 households.

== History ==
Eslamabad Rural District was created in Bikah District in 2019.
