= Rudan =

City in Hormozgan province, Iran

Rudan Persian: رودان
- City
- Location within Iran
- Coordinates: 27°26′29″N 57°11′27″E
- Country: Iran
- Province: Hormozgan
- County: Rudan
- District: Central

Population (2016)
  - Total: 36,121
- Time zone: UTC+3:30 (IRST)

Rudan (Persian: رودان) (Note: Also romanized as Rūdān; also known as Dehbarez (دهبارز), also romanized as Deh Bārez; also known as Deh Bāriz, Deh Dāriz, Qal‘eh-ye Deh Bārez, Qal‘eh-ye Deh-e Bārez, and Rūgan) is a city in the Central District of Rudan County, Hormozgan province, Iran, serving capital of both the district and the county.

== History ==
The presence of pictorial hieroglyphs and inscribed rock art in the Bd Afshan Rudn region points to the existence of Rudn's ancient civilization, which experts from the Cultural Heritage Organization believe predates the Elamite and Assyrian eras.

The region that is now known as Tabarakun was once home to a naturally occurring, relatively high dam that prevented the Armoz plain from being flooded. This dam existed before the Sasanian kings. Engineers and workers destroyed this dam during the reign of King Hormuz, a Sasanian dynasty ruler of Iran.

The later-constructed plain gained notoriety as Hermuz. Stone houses and ancient tombs are remnants of a past life away from the mountains center. The discovery of priceless artifacts, like a surgically altered skull from three thousand years before the Common Era, in a location called Tam Marv also points to the region's ancient past.

== Demographics ==
=== Language ===
The city's people speak Garmsiri dialects.

=== Population ===
At the time of the 2006 National Census, the city's population was 30,060 in 6,302 households. The following census in 2011 counted 33,285 people in 7,954 households. The 2016 census measured the population of the city as 36,121 people in 9,733 households.

== Notable people ==
- Mohammad Ebadizadeh محمد عبادی‌زاده, Cleric
- Seyyed Mostafa zolqadr سید مصطفی ذوالقدر, Cleric. Former parliamentary.
