= Qisi =

Kiş, Qişı, Gishi, Guishi, Kish-Kishlak, or Qisi may refer to:

- Kiş, Khojavend, Azerbaijan
- Kiş, Shaki, Azerbaijan
- Qisi, Georgian Grape Variety
- Qisi, Huaibin County (期思镇), town in Huaibin County, Henan, China

== See also ==
- Kis (surname)
