= Gorunești =

Goruneşti may refer to several villages in Romania:

- Goruneşti, a village in the town of Bălceşti, Vâlcea County
- Goruneşti, a village in Slătioara Commune, Vâlcea County

== See also ==
- Gorun (disambiguation)
- Goruni (disambiguation)
