= Nimeh Kareh =

Nimeh Kareh نيمه كاره
- Village
- Location within Iran
- Coordinates: 34°42′29″N 46°16′40″E
- Country: Iran
- Province: Kermanshah
- County: Salas-e Babajani
- Bakhsh: Zamkan
- Rural District: Zamkan

Population (2006)
  - Total: 411
- Time zone: UTC+3:30 (IRST)
  - Summer (DST): UTC+4:30 (IRDT)

Nimeh Kareh (Persian: نيمه كاره, also Romanized as Nīmeh Kāreh; also known as Neşfeh Kār and Nīmeh Kār) is a village in Zamkan Rural District, in the Zamkan District of Salas-e Babajani County, Kermanshah Province, Iran. At the 2006 census, its population was 411, in 90 families.
