= Varposht, Nain =

Varposht ورپشت
- Village
- Location within Iran
- Coordinates: 32°44′20″N 52°56′22″E
- Country: Iran
- Province: Isfahan
- County: Nain
- Bakhsh: Central
- Rural District: Lay Siyah

Population (2006)
  - Total: 13
- Time zone: UTC+3:30 (IRST)
  - Summer (DST): UTC+4:30 (IRDT)

Varposht (Persian: ورپشت, also Romanized as Var Posht; also known as Kharā Posht, Khar Posht, and Khar Posht) is a village in Lay Siyah Rural District, in the Central District of Nain County, Isfahan Province, Iran. At the 2006 census, its population was 13, in seven families.
