= Jaghan, Bandar Abbas =

Jaghan جغان
- Village
- Location within Iran
- Coordinates: 27°32′48″N 56°37′47″E
- Country: Iran
- Province: Hormozgan
- County: Bandar Abbas
- Bakhsh: Takht
- Rural District: Takht

Population (2006)
  - Total: 101
- Time zone: UTC+3:30 (IRST)
  - Summer (DST): UTC+4:30 (IRDT)

Jaghan (Persian: جغان, also Romanized as Jaghān and Jeghān) is a village in Takht Rural District, Takht District, Bandar Abbas County, Hormozgan Province, Iran. At the 2006 census, its population was 101, in 23 families.
