= Sar Godar, Jiroft =

Sar Godar سرگدار
- Village
- Location within Iran
- Coordinates: 28°57′08″N 57°40′59″E
- Country: Iran
- Province: Kerman
- County: Jiroft
- Bakhsh: Sarduiyeh
- Rural District: Dalfard

Population (2006)
  - Total: 22
- Time zone: UTC+3:30 (IRST)
  - Summer (DST): UTC+4:30 (IRDT)

Sar Godar (Persian: سرگدار, also Romanized as Sar Godār) is a village in Dalfard Rural District, Sarduiyeh District, Jiroft County, Kerman Province, Iran. At the 2006 census, its population was 22, in 7 families.
