= Afshin Mohebbi =

Iranian-born United States businessman

Afshin Mohebbi is an Iranian-born United States businessman, best known as the former president and Chief Operating Officer of Qwest Communications International.

== Education and background ==
A US citizen, Mohebbi was born in Iran and raised in California. Mohebbi received his Bachelor of Science degree in electrical engineering with an emphasis on communications systems from the University of California, Irvine, in two years when he was only 18 years old. He followed this up with a Telecommunications Engineering Certificate from the University of California, Los Angeles. He also has an MBA (dean's scholar) from the University of California.

== Career ==
Starting in 1983, Mohebbi undertook a series of posts in sales and marketing with Pacific Bell, including vice president-business markets; and later with SBC Communications. He then became president and managing director of British Telecom's United Kingdom Markets division, an $18 billion business unit serving 20 million consumers and 1.5 million businesses in the UK. At 34, he was the youngest BT Managing Director to lead a major division.

After 20 months Mohebbi left to join Qwest, managing the company's line operations, including market-facing business units; network engineering and operations; information technology and staff support functions. At age 36, Mohebbi became the youngest ever president of a major telecommunication company in the United States. He was appointed as co-chairman of merger integration for Qwest's merger with telephone company US West. Later he also joined the board of BearingPoint, when it signed a deal with Qwest to sell professional services.

== Allegations of fraud at Qwest ==
On March 15, 2005, Qwest CEO Joseph Nacchio, Mohebbi and six other former Qwest executives were sued by the U.S. Securities and Exchange Commission. They were accused of a $3 billion financial fraud between 1999 and 2002 and of benefiting from an inflated stock price. On March 31, 2011, United States Federal Judge Marcia Krieger issued a summary judgement dismissing the SEC's suit against Mohebbi. Nacchio was convicted of 19 counts of insider trading in Qwest stock on April 19, 2007. Mohebbi testified during Nacchio's trial.
