= Oliver Holmes Gish =

American geophysicist (1883–1987)

Oliver Holmes Gish (September 7, 1883, Dickinson County, Kansas – February 22, 1987, Athens, Georgia) was an American geophysicist, known for his research on atmospheric electricity and earth currents. He "contributed to our understanding of magnetic storms and the daily variation of the geomagnetic field."

== Biography ==
=== Early life and education ===
He was born on a farm near Abilene, Kansas and played ball with one of Dwight D. Eisenhower's older brothers. Oliver Gish graduated in 1908 in physics at Kansas State College (renamed Kansas State University in 1959).

=== Early career and further education ===
After teaching high school mathematics and physics for one school term, he worked as a weather observer for the U.S. Weather Bureau from 1909 to 1910 in Lincoln, Nebraska and from 1910 to 1911 at the Mount Weather Research Observatory near Bluemont, Virginia. From 1911 to 1913 he was a graduate student and teaching assistant in physics at the University of Nebraska. After receiving his M.S. at Nebraska, he went in 1913 to begin work on a doctoral degree in physics at the University of Göttingen. However, with the outbreak of WW I in 1914, he returned to the University of Nebraska, where he worked as a mathematics instructor from 1914 to 1916. In 1918 the Gish family moved to Pittsburgh, where Oliver Gish worked as a research engineer for the Westinghouse Corporation. One of his former students, Edna Miller, graduated with an M.S. in chemistry on June 9, 1915, and married him later on the same day. For three summers from 1915 to 1917, Oliver and Edna Gish both undertook doctoral studies at the University of Chicago. There he worked under Robert Andrews Millikan on some of the first cosmic ray research done in the U.S.A.

=== Carnegie Institution ===
In 1922 Oliver Gish became a staff member with the position of associate physicist at the Carnegie Institution's Department of Terrestrial Magnetism (DTM). He was recommended by Sebastian Mauchly (the father of the digital computer pioneer John Mauchly). The Gish family's third daughter, Helen Pauline, was born in December 1922. At the Carnegie Institution's DTM he held the positions of physicist from 1927 to 1928 and section chief of terrestrial electricity from 1928 to 1948, as well as being the assistant director from 1933 to 1946. Donald Miller Gish was the youngest of Oliver and Edna Gish's four children. From 1922 to 1944 the Gish family lived in Somerset, Maryland, where both Oliver and Edna Gish were members of the town council.

In 1929 Oliver Gish participated in the first leg of the research vessel Carnegie, which was destroyed in November 1929 by an onboard explosion while in port in Apia, Samoa.

For the 1936 project Explorer II, he designed instruments for measuring air conductivity in the stratosphere. For studying electrical phenomena caused by volcanic eruptions, he participated in a 1939 expedition in Guatemala and in a 1945 expedition in Mexico.

=== Post Carnegie career and retirement ===
After retiring from the Carnegie Institute in 1948, Gish became a consultant for a joint project of the DTM and the U.S. Air Force. From 1948 to 1949 he directed the project, working with George R. Wait, involving flights of B-29 planes, equipped with scientific instruments, through and around thunderstorms to collect data.

In collaboration with George R. Wait, Gish studied how the Earth’s atmosphere is affected by atomic bomb tests. Gish developed electrometer designs and collaborated "in instrument development for earth-currents, conductivity, and ionization research".

In 1953 Gish did research for the U.S. Naval Mine Defense Laboratory in Panama City, Florida. From 1955 to 1956 he was a visiting professor of physics at Southern Illinois University Carbondale. He retired completely in 1957, when he and his wife settled in Fort Pierce, Florida. In 1976 the couple moved to a retirement home in Athens, Georgia, where their daughter Lois Eileen Gish Scott was a faculty member at the University of Georgia.

=== Organisational affiliations ===
Oliver H. Gish was elected in 1922 a fellow of the American Association for the Advancement of Science and in 1923 a fellow of the American Physical Society. He was from 1935 to 1938 the president of the American Geophysical Union's Terrestrial Magnetism and Electricity Section.

=== Personal life ===
He was married to Edna Emma (née Miller) Gish for 72 years. They had three daughters and one son. Gish died in 1987. His daughter Eileen Gish Crow (1917–2014) bequeathed to the Carnegie Institution's DTM a monetary gift in her will, in memory of her father.

== Selected publications ==
- Gish, O. H. (1923). "General description of the Earth-current measuring system at the Watheroo Magnetic Observatory". Journal of Geophysical Research. 28 (3): 89–108. Bibcode:1923TeMAE..28...89G. doi:10.1029/TE028i003p00089.
- ——; Rooney, W. J. (1925). "Measurement of resistivity of large masses of undisturbed earth". Journal of Geophysical Research. 30 (4): 161–188. Bibcode:1925TeMAE..30..161G. doi:10.1029/TE030i004p00161.
- Rooney, W. J.; —— (1927). "Results of Earth-resistivity surveys near Watheroo, Western Australia, and at Ebro, Spain". Journal of Geophysical Research. 32 (2): 49–63. Bibcode:1927TeMAE..32...49R. doi:10.1029/TE032i002p00049.
- ——; Rooney, W. J. (1930). "Results of Earth-current observations at Huancayo Magnetic Observatory, 1927–1929". Journal of Geophysical Research. 35 (4): 213–224. Bibcode:1930TeMAE..35..213G. doi:10.1029/TE035i004p00213.
- ——; Sherman, K. L. (1938). "Latitude-effect in electrical resistance of a column of atmosphere". Transactions, American Geophysical Union. 19 (1): 193–199. Bibcode:1938TrAGU..19..193G. doi:10.1029/TR019i001p00193-2.
- —— (1944). "Evaluation and Interpretation of the Columnar Resistance of the Atmosphere". Journal of Geophysical Research. 49 (3): 159–168. Bibcode:1944TeMAE..49..159G. doi:10.1029/TE049i003p00159.
- —— (1951). "Chapter. Universal Aspects of Atmospheric Electricity". Compendium of Meteorology. pp. 101–119. doi:10.1007/978-1-940033-70-9_8. ISBN 978-1-940033-70-9.
