= Poshtkuh Rural District =

Poshtkuh Rural District (Persian: دهستان پشتكوه) may refer to:

- Poshtkuh Rural District (Dashtestan County), Bushehr province
- Poshtkuh Rural District (Ardal County), Chaharmahal and Bakhtiari province
- Poshtkuh Rural District (Lordegan County), Chaharmahal and Bakhtiari province
- Poshtkuh Rural District (Isfahan Province)
- Poshtkuh Rural District (Mazandaran Province)
- Poshtkuh Rural District (Semnan Province)
- Poshtkuh Rural District (Sistan and Baluchestan Province)
- Poshtkuh Rural District (Firuzkuh County), Tehran province

== See also ==
- Poshtkuh-e Mugui Rural District, in Isfahan province
