= Faryab Rural District =

Rural district in Hormozgan province, Iran

Faryab Rural District Persian: دهستان فارياب
- Rural District
- Location within Iran
- Coordinates: 27°27′43″N 57°06′36″E
- Province: Hormozgan
- County: Rudan
- District: Central
- Capital: Faryab

Population (2016)
  - Total: 2,922
- Time zone: UTC+3:30 (IRST)

Faryab Rural District (Persian: دهستان فارياب) is in the Central District of Rudan County, Hormozgan province, Iran. Its capital is the village of Faryab. The previous capital of the rural district was the village of Bikah, now a city.

== Demographics ==
=== Population ===
At the time of the 2006 National Census, the rural district's population was 2,495 in 505 households. There were 3,077 inhabitants in 530 households at the following census of 2011. The 2016 census measured the population of the rural district as 2,922 in 577 households. The most populous of its 15 villages was Faryab, with 1,146 people.
