= Sar Godar, Razavi Khorasan =

Sar Godar سرگدار
- Village
- Location within Iran
- Coordinates: 35°34′45″N 59°33′39″E
- Country: Iran
- Province: Razavi Khorasan
- County: Fariman
- Bakhsh: Central
- Rural District: Balaband

Population (2006)
  - Total: 156
- Time zone: UTC+3:30 (IRST)
  - Summer (DST): UTC+4:30 (IRDT)

Sar Godar (Persian: سرگدار, also Romanized as Sar Godār) is a village in Balaband Rural District, in the Central District of Fariman County, Razavi Khorasan Province, Iran. At the 2006 census, its population was 156, in 31 families.
