= Sarkahnan-e Davari =

Sarkahnan-e Davari سركهنان داورئ
- Village
- Location within Iran
- Coordinates: 26°34′06″N 57°36′52″E
- Country: Iran
- Province: Hormozgan
- County: Minab
- Bakhsh: Senderk
- Rural District: Dar Pahn

Population (2006)
  - Total: 105
- Time zone: UTC+3:30 (IRST)
  - Summer (DST): UTC+4:30 (IRDT)

Sarkahnan-e Davari (Persian: سركهنان داورئ, also Romanized as Sarkahnān-e Dāvarī) is a village in Dar Pahn Rural District, Senderk District, Minab County, Hormozgan Province, Iran. At the 2006 census, its population was 105, in 24 families.
