= Ziarat-e Ali =

City in Hormozgan province, Iran

Ziarat-e Ali Persian: زيارتعلي
- City
- Location within Iran
- Coordinates: 27°44′27″N 57°13′33″E
- Country: Iran
- Province: Hormozgan
- County: Rudan
- District: Rudkhaneh

Population (2016)
  - Total: 2,679
- Time zone: UTC+3:30 (IRST)

Ziarat-e Ali (Persian: زيارتعلي) (Note: Also romanized as Zeyārat-e ‘Alī, Zīārat-e ‘Alī, and Zīyarat Alī; also known as Dar-e Khūneh-ye ‘Alī and Zīārat-e ‘Alī-ye ‘Olyā) is a city in, and the capital of, Rudkhaneh District of Rudan County, Hormozgan province, Iran. It also serves as the administrative center for Rudkhaneh Rural District.

== Demographics ==
=== Population ===
At the time of the 2006 National Census, the city's population was 2,506 in 523 households. The following census in 2011 counted 3,075 people in 669 households. The 2016 census measured the population of the city as 2,679 people in 713 households.
