= Tang Rud, Gilan =

Tang Rud تنگ رود
- Village
- Location within Iran
- Coordinates: 36°51′03″N 49°57′07″E
- Country: Iran
- Province: Gilan
- County: Siahkal
- Bakhsh: Deylaman
- Rural District: Deylaman

Population (2006)
  - Total: 88
- Time zone: UTC+3:30 (IRST)

Tang Rud (Persian: تنگ رود, also Romanized as Tang Rūd; also known as Tankrūd) is a village in Deylaman Rural District, Deylaman District, Siahkal County, Gilan Province, Iran. At the 2016 census, its population was 55, in 21 families. Down from 88 people in 2006.
