= Balashahr, Rudan =

City in Hormozgan province, Iran

Balashahr Persian: بالاشهر
- City
- Location within Iran
- Coordinates: 27°12′43″N 57°20′57″E
- Country: Iran
- Province: Hormozgan
- County: Rudan
- District: Jaghin

Population (2016)
  - Total: 1,277
- Time zone: UTC+3:30 (IRST)

Balashahr (Persian: بالاشهر) (Note: Formerly Jaghin (جغين), also romanized as Jaghīn) is a city in, and the capital of, Jaghin District of Rudan County, Hormozgan province, Iran. It also serves as the administrative center for Jaghin-e Shomali Rural District.

== Demographics ==
=== Population ===
At the time of the 2006 National Census, the population was 491 in 105 households, as the village of Jaghin in Jaghin-e Shomali Rural District. The following census in 2011 counted 939 people in 231 households, by which time the village appears as Balashahr. The 2016 census measured the population of the village as 1,277 people in 336 households.

Balashahr was elevated to the status of a city in 2017.
