= Oniceni =

- Commune
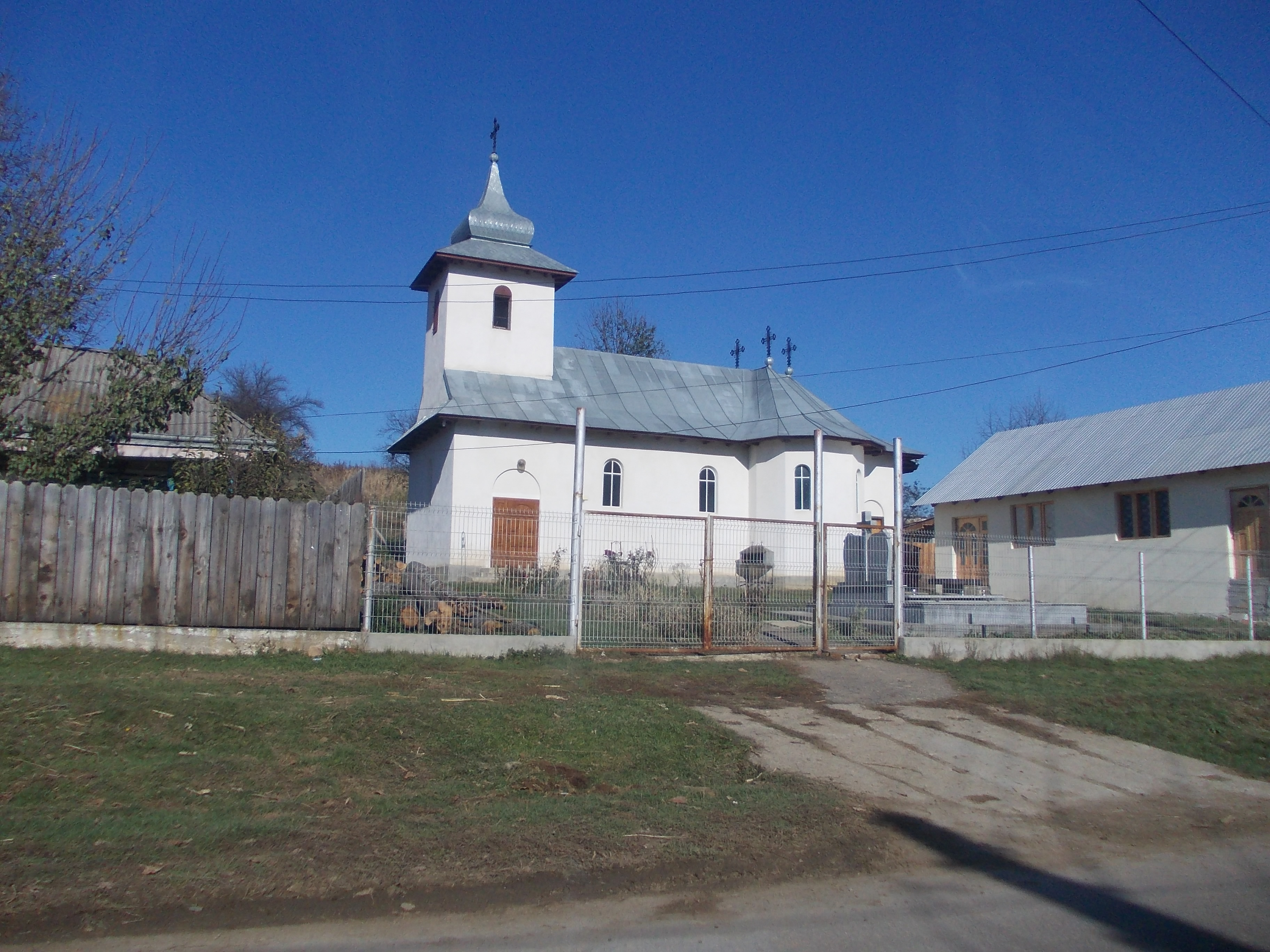
- Church in Valea Enei

- Location in Neamț County

- Location in Romania
- Coordinates: 46°48′N 27°9′E
- Country: Romania
- County: Neamț

Government
  - Mayor (2020–2024): Ioan Duminică (PSD)
- Area: 45.42 km^{2} (17.54 sq mi)
- Elevation: 254 m (833 ft)
- Population (2021-12-01): 3,351
  - Density: 73.78/km^{2} (191.1/sq mi)
- Time zone: UTC+02:00 (EET)
  - Summer (DST): UTC+03:00 (EEST)
- Postal code: 617280
- Area code: +(40) 233
- Vehicle reg.: NT
- Website: www.comunaoniceni.ro

Oniceni is a commune in Neamț County, Western Moldavia, Romania. It is composed of eleven villages: Ciornei, Gorun, Linseşti, Lunca, Mărmureni, Oniceni, Pietrosu, Poiana Humei, Pustieta, Solca, and Valea Enei.

Historical population
Year	Pop.	±%
1992	3,247	—
2002	3,257	+0.3%
2011	3,388	+4.0%
2021	3,351	−1.1%
Source: Census data
