= Tang Rud Zizi =

Tang Rud Zizi تنگ رودزيزي
- Village
- Location within Iran
- Coordinates: 30°18′13″N 50°44′02″E
- Country: Iran
- Province: Kohgiluyeh and Boyer-Ahmad
- County: Boyer-Ahmad
- Bakhsh: Ludab
- Rural District: Ludab

Population (2006)
  - Total: 81
- Time zone: UTC+3:30 (IRST)
  - Summer (DST): UTC+4:30 (IRDT)

Tang Rud Zizi (Persian: تنگ رودزيزي, also Romanized as Tang Rūd Zīzī; also known as Tang Rūd) is a village in Ludab Rural District, Ludab District, Boyer-Ahmad County, Kohgiluyeh and Boyer-Ahmad Province, Iran. At the 2006 census, its population was 81, in 14 families.
