= Gheybi, Lorestan =

Gheybi غيبي
- Village
- Location within Iran
- Coordinates: 33°34′44″N 48°40′12″E
- Country: Iran
- Province: Lorestan
- County: Khorramabad
- Bakhsh: Zagheh
- Rural District: Zagheh

Population (2006)
  - Total: 64
- Time zone: UTC+3:30 (IRST)
  - Summer (DST): UTC+4:30 (IRDT)

Gheybi (Persian: غيبي, also Romanized as Gheybī; also known as Gheybī-ye Pā’īn) is a village in Zagheh Rural District, Zagheh District, Khorramabad County, Lorestan Province, Iran. At the 2006 census, its population was 64, in 15 families.
