= Jaghan, Hajjiabad =

Jaghan جغان
- Village
- Location within Iran
- Coordinates: 28°05′38″N 57°00′13″E
- Country: Iran
- Province: Hormozgan
- County: Hajjiabad
- Bakhsh: Ahmadi
- Rural District: Kuh Shah

Population (2006)
  - Total: 335
- Time zone: UTC+3:30 (IRST)
  - Summer (DST): UTC+4:30 (IRDT)

Jaghan (Persian: جغان, also Romanized as Jaghān; also known as Jaghīn and Jaqān) is a village in Kuh Shah Rural District, Ahmadi District, Hajjiabad County, Hormozgan Province, Iran. At the 2006 census, its population was 335, in 72 families.
