= Bikah, Iran =

City in Hormozgan province, Iran

Bikah Persian: بیکاه
- City
- Location within Iran
- Coordinates: 27°21′17″N 57°10′50″E
- Country: Iran
- Province: Hormozgan
- County: Rudan
- District: Bikah

Population (2016)
  - Total: 7,190
- Time zone: UTC+3:30 (IRST)

Bikah (Persian: بیکاه) (Note: Also romanized as Bī Kāh; also known as Bīkā, romanized as Bika) is a city in, and the capital of, Bikah District of Rudan County, Hormozgan province, Iran. As a village, it was the capital of Faryab Rural District until its capital was transferred to the village of Faryab. Bikah then became the capital of Bikah Rural District.

== Demographics ==
=== Population ===
At the time of the 2006 National Census, Bikah's population was 6,378 in 1,331 households, when it was a village in Bikah Rural District. The following census in 2011 counted 7,002 people in 1,734 households, by which time Bikah had been elevated to the status of a city. The 2016 census measured the population of the city as 7,190 people in 2,045 households.
