= Poshtkuh, Anbarabad =

Poshtkuh پشتكوه
- Village
- Location within Iran
- Coordinates: 28°29′14″N 57°55′02″E
- Country: Iran
- Province: Kerman
- County: Anbarabad
- Bakhsh: Central
- Rural District: Aliabad

Population (2006)
  - Total: 104
- Time zone: UTC+3:30 (IRST)
  - Summer (DST): UTC+4:30 (IRDT)

Poshtkuh (Persian: پشتكوه, also Romanized as Poshtkūh; also known as Khar Posht and Posht Kūh-e Khar Posht) is a village in Aliabad Rural District, in the Central District of Anbarabad County, Kerman Province, Iran. At the 2006 census, its population was 104, in 21 families.
