= Bikah Rural District =

Rural district in Hormozgan province, Iran

Bikah Rural District Persian: دهستان بیکاه
- Rural District
- Location within Iran
- Coordinates: 27°18′45″N 57°09′50″E
- Country: Iran
- Province: Hormozgan
- County: Rudan
- District: Bikah
- Capital: Kahnshuiyeh

Population (2016)
  - Total: 8,732
- Time zone: UTC+3:30 (IRST)

Bikah Rural District (Persian: دهستان بیکاه) is in Bikah District of Rudan County, Hormozgan province, Iran. Its capital is the village of Kahnshuiyeh. The previous capital of the rural district was the village of Bikah, now a city.

== Demographics ==
=== Population ===
At the time of the 2006 National Census, the rural district's population was 14,204 in 2,966 households. There were 8,506 inhabitants in 2,152 households at the following census of 2011. The 2016 census measured the population of the rural district as 8,732 in 2,433 households. The most populous of its eight villages was Eslamabad, with 5,618 people.
