= Gishi, Nagorno-Karabakh =

Gishi Գիշի
- Kiş
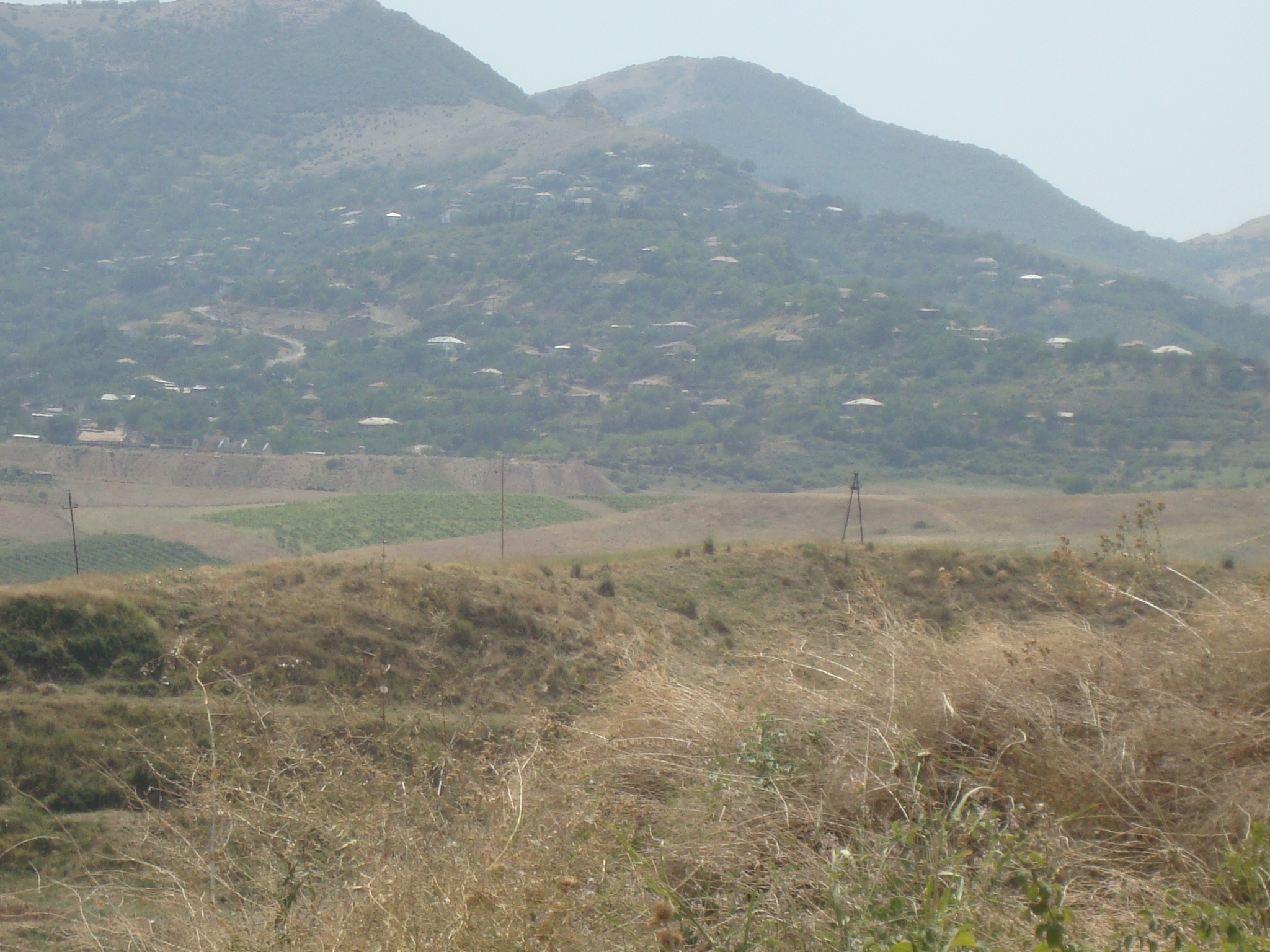

- Location within Azerbaijan
- Coordinates: 39°46′31″N 47°01′13″E
- Country: Azerbaijan
  - District: Khojavend

Population (2015)
  - Total: 1,115
- Time zone: UTC+4 (AZT)

Gishi (Armenian: Գիշի, also Gish, Գիշ) or Kish (Azerbaijani: Kiş) is a village in the Khojavend District of Azerbaijan, in the disputed region of Nagorno-Karabakh. Until 2023 it was controlled by the breakaway Republic of Artsakh. The village had an ethnic Armenian-majority population until the expulsion of the Armenian population of Nagorno-Karabakh by Azerbaijan following the 2023 Azerbaijani offensive in Nagorno-Karabakh.

== History ==
During the Soviet period, the village was a part of the Martuni District of the Nagorno-Karabakh Autonomous Oblast.

== Historical heritage sites ==
Historical heritage sites in and around the village include the 18th/19th-century shrine of Voske Khach (Armenian: Ոսկե խաչ), and an 18th/19th-century spring monument.

== Economy and culture ==
The population is mainly engaged in agriculture and animal husbandry. As of 2015, the village has a municipal building, a house of culture, a secondary school, six shops, and a medical centre.

== Demographics ==
The village had 1,234 inhabitants in 2005, and 1,115 inhabitants in 2015.

== Gallery ==
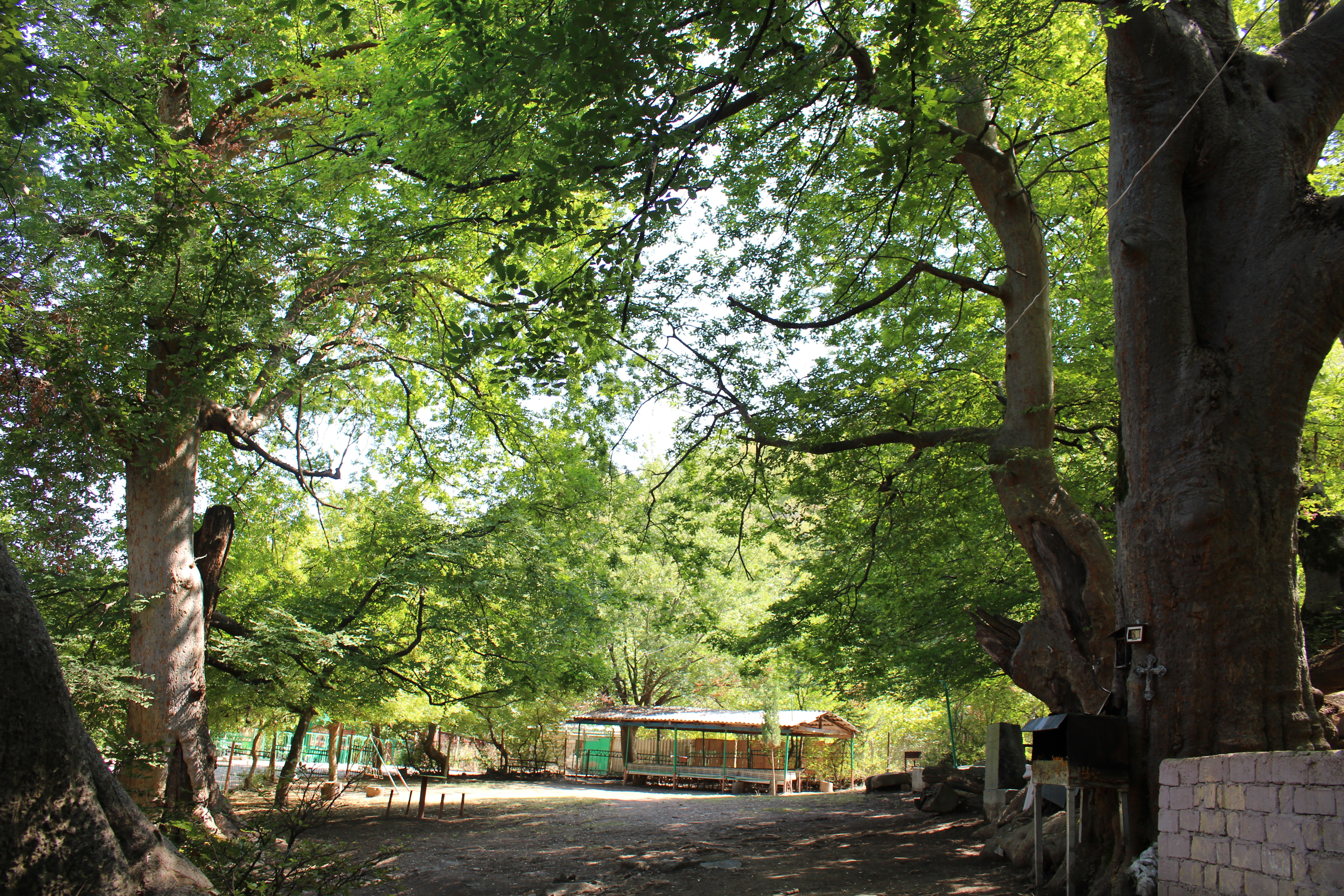
Voske Khach shrine

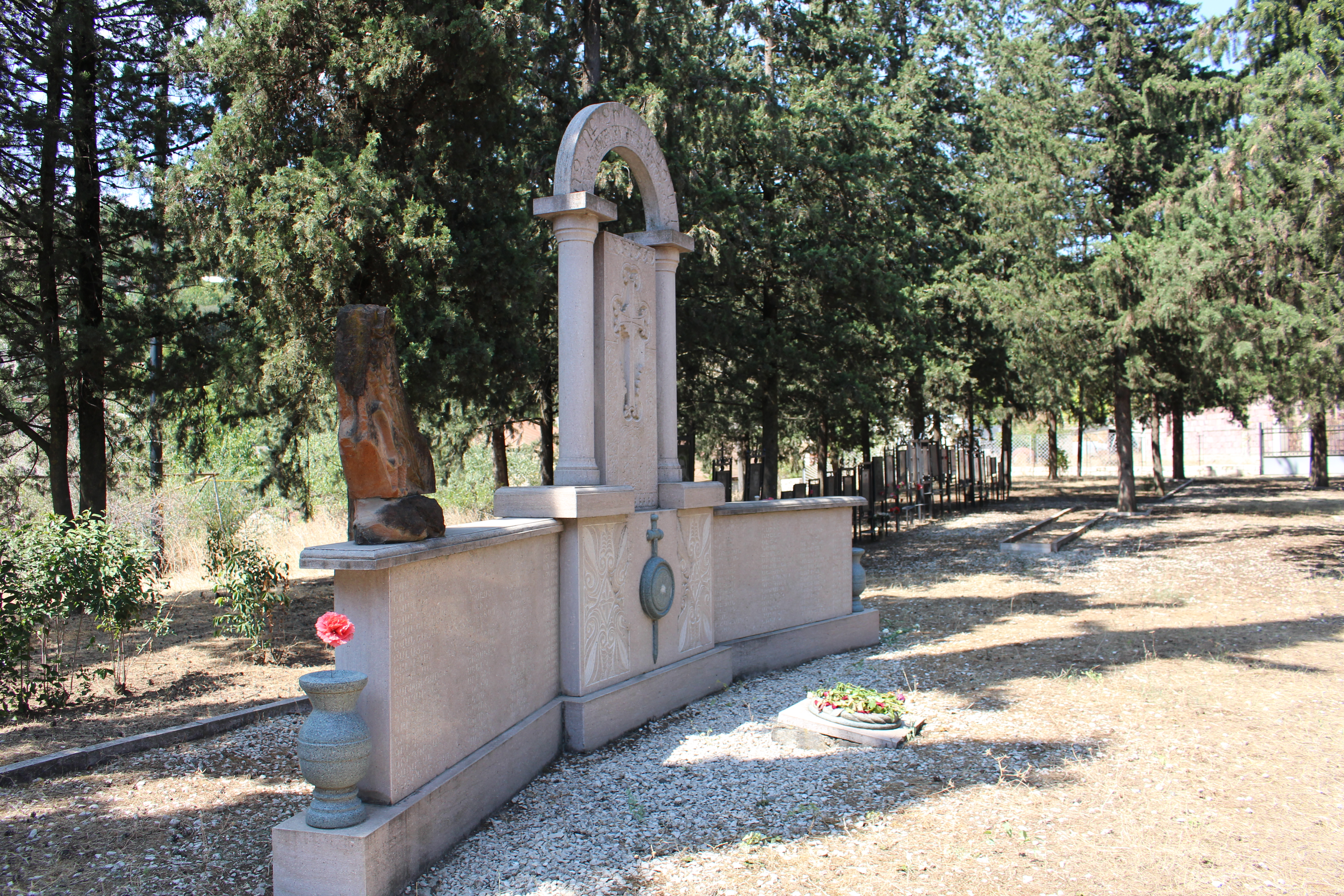
First Nagorno-Karabakh War monument

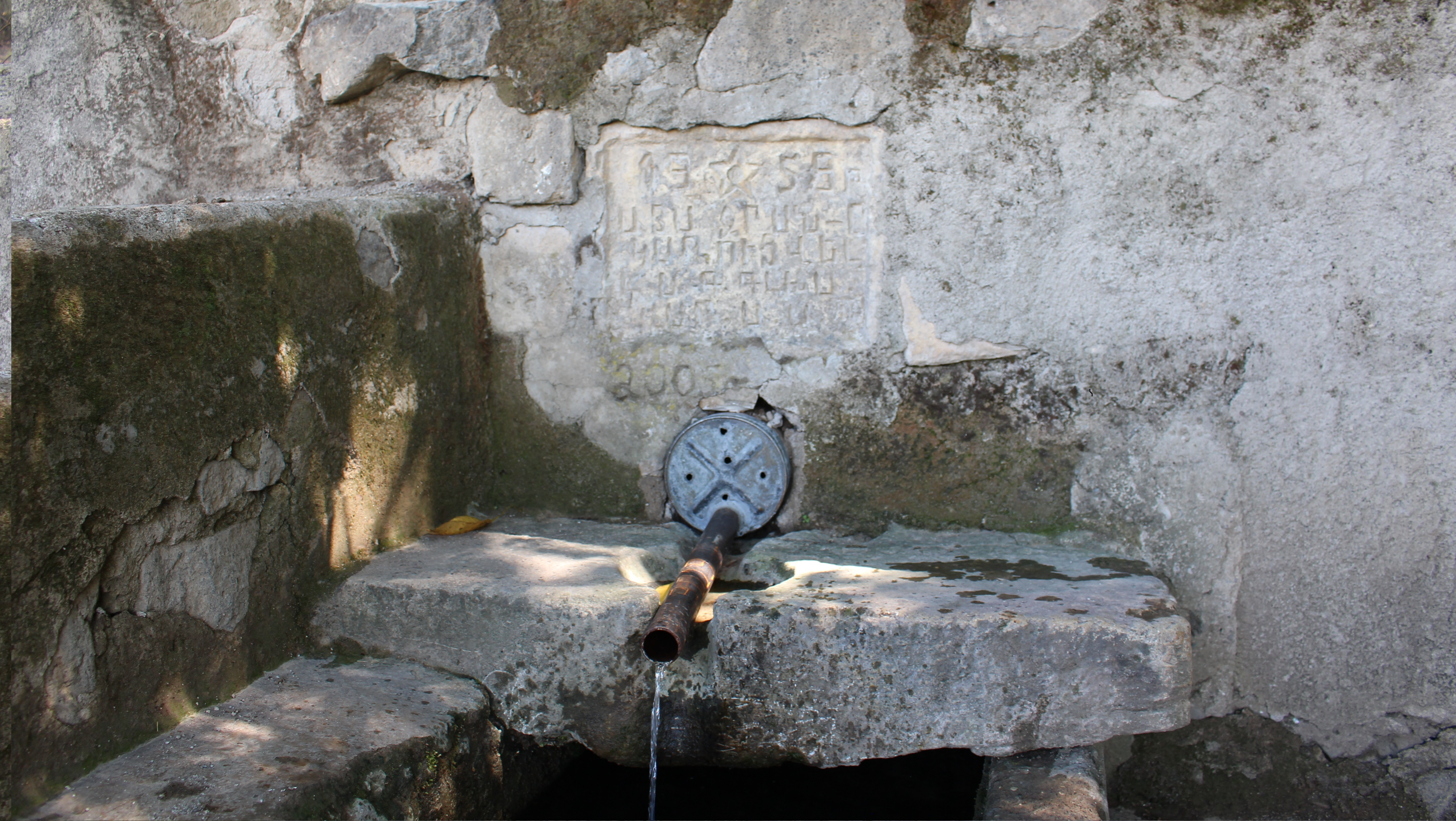
Bjamal spring

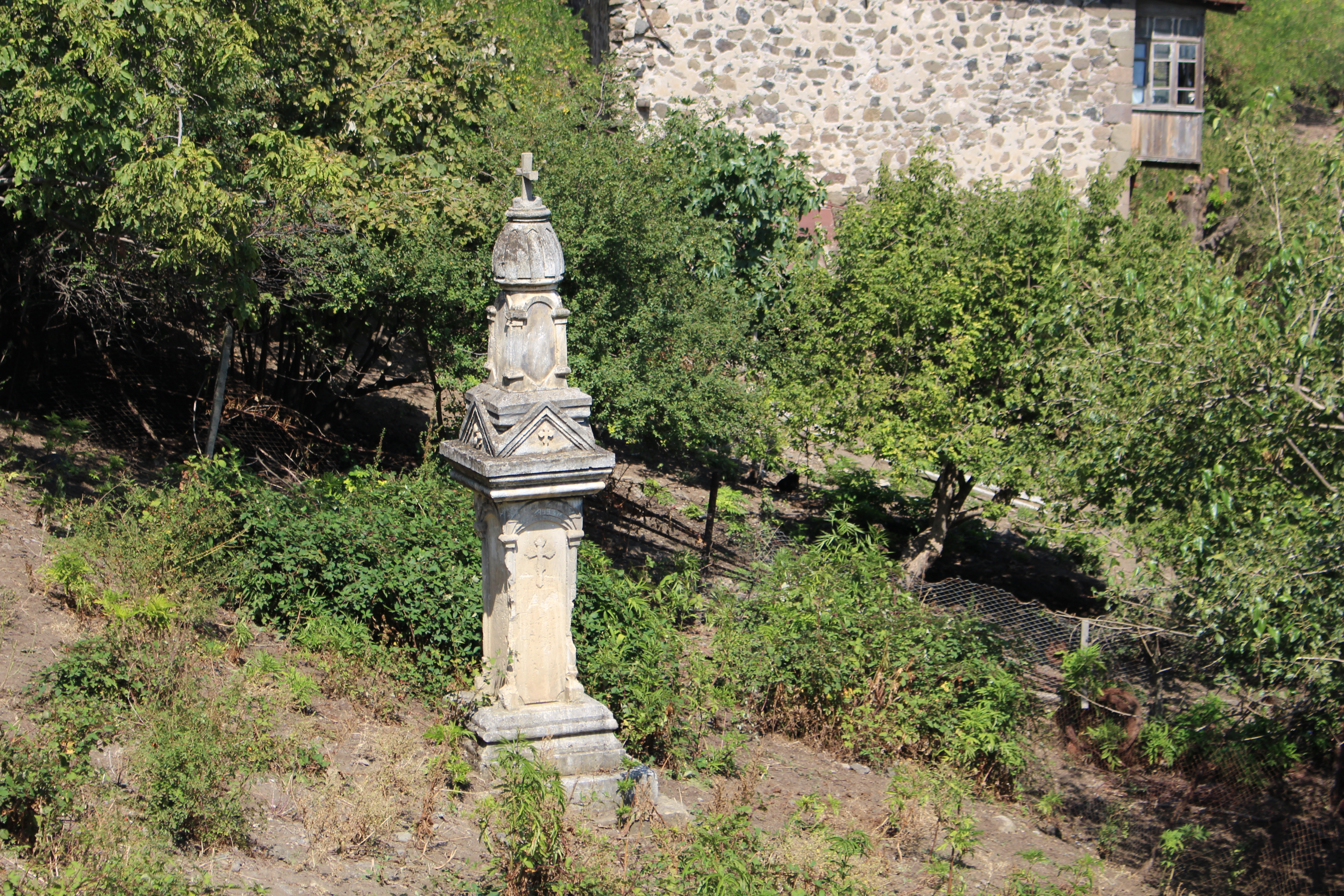
Cemetery in the village
