= Jaghin-e Shomali Rural District =

Rural district in Hormozgan province, Iran

Jaghin-e Shomali Rural District Persian: دهستان جغين شمالي
- Rural District
- Location within Iran
- Coordinates: 27°16′23″N 57°21′39″E
- Country: Iran
- Province: Hormozgan
- County: Rudan
- District: Jaghin
- Capital: Balashahr

Population (2016)
  - Total: 9,382
- Time zone: UTC+3:30 (IRST)

Jaghin-e Shomali Rural District (Persian: دهستان جغين شمالي) is in Jaghin District of Rudan County, Hormozgan province, Iran. It is administered from the city of Balashahr.

== Demographics ==
=== Population ===
At the time of the 2006 National Census, the rural district's population was 7,171 in 1,482 households. There were 10,069 inhabitants in 2,443 households at the following census of 2011. The 2016 census measured the population of the rural district as 9,382 in 2,611 households. The most populous of its 11 villages was Qaleh, with 1,373 people.
