= Jaghin-e Jonubi Rural District =

Rural district in Hormozgan province, Iran

Jaghin-e Jonubi Rural District Persian: دهستان جغين جنوبي
- Rural District
- Location within Iran
- Coordinates: 27°09′19″N 57°18′17″E
- Country: Iran
- Province: Hormozgan
- County: Rudan
- District: Jaghin
- Capital: Palur

Population (2016)
  - Total: 5,086
- Time zone: UTC+3:30 (IRST)

Jaghin-e Jonubi Rural District (Persian: دهستان جغين جنوبي) is in Jaghin District of Rudan County, Hormozgan province, Iran. Its capital is the village of Palur.

== Demographics ==
=== Population ===
At the time of the 2006 National Census, the rural district's population was 4,083 in 847 households. There were 5,249 inhabitants in 1,351 households at the following census of 2011. The 2016 census measured the population of the rural district as 5,086 in 1,399 households. The most populous of its 11 villages was Palur, with 1,370 people.
