= Berentin Rural District =

Rural district in Hormozgan province, Iran

Berentin Rural District Persian: دهستان برنطين
- Rural District
- Location within Iran
- Coordinates: 27°15′24″N 57°16′28″E
- Country: Iran
- Province: Hormozgan
- County: Rudan
- District: Central
- Capital: Berentin

Population (2016)
  - Total: 8,684
- Time zone: UTC+3:30 (IRST)

Berentin Rural District (Persian: دهستان برنطين) is in the Central District of Rudan County, Hormozgan province, Iran. Its capital is the village of Berentin.

== Demographics ==
=== Population ===
At the time of the 2006 National Census, the rural district's population (as a part of Bikah District) was 8,328 in 1,700 households. There were 9,032 inhabitants in 2,336 households at the following census of 2011. The 2016 census measured the population of the rural district as 8,684 in 2,472 households. The most populous of its 10 villages was Berentin, with 5,799 people.

In 2019, the rural district was separated from the district to join the Central District.
