= Rudkhaneh Rural District =

Rural district in Hormozgan province, Iran

Rudkhaneh Rural District Persian: دهستان رودخانه
- Rural District
- Location within Iran
- Coordinates: 27°44′08″N 57°11′32″E
- Country: Iran
- Province: Hormozgan
- County: Rudan
- District: Rudkhaneh
- Capital: Ziarat-e Ali

Population (2016)
  - Total: 3,338
- Time zone: UTC+3:30 (IRST)

Rudkhaneh Rural District (Persian: دهستان رودخانه) is in Rudkhaneh District of Rudan County, Hormozgan province, Iran. It is administered from the city of Ziarat-e Ali.

== Demographics ==
=== Population ===
At the time of the 2006 National Census, the rural district's population was 2,572 in 548 households. There were 2,643 inhabitants in 664 households at the following census of 2011. The 2016 census measured the population of the rural district as 3,338 in 995 households. The most populous of its 23 villages was Samilan-e Bala, with 506 people.
