= Jaghin District =

District in Hormozgan province, Iran

Jaghin District Persian: بخش جغین
- District
- Location within Iran
- Coordinates: 27°13′28″N 57°20′08″E
- Country: Iran
- Province: Hormozgan
- County: Rudan
- Capital: Balashahr

Population (2016)
  - Total: 14,468
- Time zone: UTC+3:30 (IRST)

Jaghin District (Persian: بخش جغین) is in Rudan County, Hormozgan province, Iran. Its capital is the city of Balashahr.

== History ==
In 2017, the village of Balashahr was elevated to the status of a city.

== Demographics ==
=== Population ===
At the time of the 2006 National Census, the district's population was 11,254 in 2,329 households. The following census in 2011 counted 15,318 people in 3,794 households. The 2016 census measured the population of the district as 14,468 inhabitants in 4,010 households.

=== Administrative divisions ===
Jaghin District Population
Administrative Divisions	2006	2011	2016
Jaghin-e Jonubi RD	4,083	5,249	5,086
Jaghin-e Shomali RD	7,171	10,069	9,382
Balashahr (city) (Note: Became a city after the 2016 census)			
Total	11,254	15,318	14,468
RD = Rural District
