= Bikah District =

District in Hormozgan province, Iran

Bikah District Persian: بخش بیکاه
- District
- Location within Iran
- Coordinates: 27°19′09″N 57°09′02″E
- Country: Iran
- Province: Hormozgan
- County: Rudan
- Capital: Bikah

Population (2016)
  - Total: 24,606
- Time zone: UTC+3:30 (IRST)

Bikah District (Persian: بخش بیکاه) is in Rudan County, Hormozgan province, Iran. Its capital is the city of Bikah.

== History ==
After the 2006 National Census, the village of Bikah was elevated to the status of a city. In 2019, Eslamabad Rural District was created in the district, and Berentin Rural District was separated from it to join the Central District.

== Demographics ==
=== Population ===
At the time of the 2006 census, the district's population was 22,532 in 4,666 households. The following census in 2011 counted 24,540 people in 6,222 households. The 2016 census measured the population of the district as 24,606 inhabitants in 6,950 households.

=== Administrative divisions ===
Bikah District Population
Administrative Divisions	2006	2011	2016
Berentin RD (Note: Transferred to the Central District after the 2016 census)	8,328	9,032	8,684
Bikah RD	14,204	8,506	8,732
Eslamabad RD (Note: Established after the 2016 census)			
Bikah (city)		7,002	7,190
Total	22,532	24,540	24,606
RD = Rural District
