= Abnama Rural District =

Rural district in Hormozgan province, Iran

Abnama Rural District Persian: دهستان آب نما
- Rural District
- Location within Iran
- Coordinates: 27°27′45″N 57°17′36″E
- Country: Iran
- Province: Hormozgan
- County: Rudan
- District: Central
- Capital: Kharaji

Population (2016)
  - Total: 22,271
- Time zone: UTC+3:30 (IRST)

Abnama Rural District (Persian: دهستان آب نما) is in the Central District of Rudan County, Hormozgan province, Iran. Its capital is the village of Kharaji.

== Demographics ==
=== Population ===
At the time of the 2006 National Census, the rural district's population was 17,855 in 3,747 households. There were 20,662 inhabitants in 5,153 households at the following census of 2011. The 2016 census measured the population of the rural district as 22,271 in 6,303 households. The most populous of its 42 villages was Kharaji, with 4,712 people.
