= Rahdar Rural District =

Rural district in Hormozgan province, Iran

Rahdar Rural District Persian: دهستان راهدار
- Rural District
- Location within Iran
- Coordinates: 27°36′54″N 57°03′50″E
- Country: Iran
- Province: Hormozgan
- County: Rudan
- District: Central
- Capital: Rahdar

Population (2016)
  - Total: 2,302
- Time zone: UTC+3:30 (IRST)

Rahdar Rural District (Persian: دهستان راهدار) is in the Central District of Rudan County, Hormozgan province, Iran. Its capital is the village of Rahdar.

== Demographics ==
=== Population ===
At the time of the 2006 National Census, the rural district's population was 2,406 in 558 households. There were 2,636 inhabitants in 719 households at the following census of 2011. The 2016 census measured the population of the rural district as 2,302 in 701 households. The most populous of its 75 villages was Ziarat-e Pirchugan, with 917 people.
