= Rudkhaneh Bar Rural District =

Rural district in Hormozgan province, Iran

Rudkhaneh Bar Rural District Persian: دهستان رودخانه بر
- Rural District
- Location within Iran
- Coordinates: 27°50′22″N 57°20′49″E
- Country: Iran
- Province: Hormozgan
- County: Rudan
- District: Rudkhaneh
- Capital: Faryab

Population (2016)
  - Total: 8,862
- Time zone: UTC+3:30 (IRST)

Rudkhaneh Bar Rural District (Persian: دهستان رودخانه بر) is in Rudkhaneh District of Rudan County, Hormozgan province, Iran. Its capital is the village of Faryab.

== Demographics ==
=== Population ===
At the time of the 2006 National Census, the rural district's population was 7,431 in 1,636 households. There were 8,242 inhabitants in 2,090 households at the following census of 2011. The 2016 census measured the population of the rural district as 8,862 in 2,506 households. The most populous of its 36 villages was Kordi Shirazi, with 2,288 people.
