= Mosaferabad Rural District =

Rural district in Hormozgan province, Iran

Mosaferabad Rural District Persian: دهستان مسافرآباد
- Rural District
- Location within Iran
- Coordinates: 27°49′09″N 57°03′01″E
- Country: Iran
- Province: Hormozgan
- County: Rudan
- District: Rudkhaneh
- Capital: Nurabad

Population (2016)
  - Total: 6,727
- Time zone: UTC+3:30 (IRST)

Mosaferabad Rural District (Persian: دهستان مسافرآباد) is in Rudkhaneh District of Rudan County, Hormozgan province, Iran. Its capital is the village of Nurabad.

== Demographics ==
=== Population ===
At the time of the 2006 National Census, the rural district's population was 5,111 in 1,109 households. There were 5,069 inhabitants in 1,322 households at the following census of 2011. The 2016 census measured the population of the rural district as 6,727 in 2,002 households. The most populous of its 52 villages was Mohammadabad, with 535 people.
