= Central District (Rudan County) =

District in Hormozgan province, Iran

Central District (Rudan County) Persian: بخش مرکزی شهرستان رودان
- District
- Location within Iran
- Coordinates: 27°26′33″N 57°08′18″E
- Country: Iran
- Province: Hormozgan
- County: Rudan
- Capital: Rudan

Population (2016)
  - Total: 63,616
- Time zone: UTC+3:30 (IRST)

The Central District of Rudan County (Persian: بخش مرکزی شهرستان رودان) is in Hormozgan province, Iran. Its capital is the city of Rudan. (Note: Formerly Dehbarez)

== History ==
In 2019, Berentin Rural District was separated from Bikah District to join the Central District.

== Demographics ==
=== Population ===
At the time of the 2006 National Census, the district's population was 52,816 in 11,112 households. The following census in 2011 counted 59,660 people in 14,356 households. The 2016 census measured the population of the district as 63,616 inhabitants in 17,314 households.

=== Administrative divisions ===
Central District (Rudan County) Population
Administrative Divisions	2006	2011	2016
Abnama RD	17,855	20,662	22,271
Berentin RD (Note: Transferred from Bikah District after the 2016 census)			
Faryab RD	2,495	3,077	2,922
Rahdar RD	2,406	2,636	2,302
Rudan (city)	30,060	33,285	36,121
Total	52,816	59,660	63,616
RD = Rural District
