= Rudkhaneh District =

District in Hormozgan province, Iran

Rudkhaneh District Persian: بخش رودخانه
- District
- Location within Iran
- Coordinates: 27°49′09″N 57°09′06″E
- Country: Iran
- Province: Hormozgan
- County: Rudan
- Capital: Ziarat-e Ali

Population (2016)
  - Total: 21,606
- Time zone: UTC+3:30 (IRST)

Rudkhaneh District (Persian: بخش رودخانه) is in Rudan County, Hormozgan province, Iran. Its capital is the city of Ziarat-e Ali.

== Demographics ==
=== Population ===
At the time of the 2006 National Census, the district's population was 17,620 in 3,616 households. The following census in 2011 counted 19,029 people in 4,745 households. The 2016 census measured the population of the district as 21,606 inhabitants in 6,216 households.

=== Administrative divisions ===
Rudkhaneh District Population
Administrative Divisions	2006	2011	2016
Mosaferabad RD	5,111	5,069	6,727
Rudkhaneh RD	2,572	2,643	3,338
Rudkhaneh Bar RD	7,431	8,242	8,862
Ziarat-e Ali (city)	2,506	3,075	2,679
Total	17,620	19,029	21,606
RD = Rural District
