= Rudan County =

County in Hormozgan province, Iran

Rudan County Persian: شهرستان رودان
- County
- Location of Rudan County in Hormozgan province (top right, pink)

- Location of Hormozgan province in Iran
- Coordinates: 27°32′N 57°15′E
- Country: Iran
- Province: Hormozgan
- Capital: Rudan
- Districts: Central, Bikah, Jaghin, Rudkhaneh

Area
  - Total: 3,100 km^{2} (1,200 sq mi)

Population (2016)
  - Total: 124,522
  - Density: 40/km^{2} (100/sq mi)
- Time zone: UTC+3:30 (IRST)

Rudan County (Persian: شهرستان رودان) is in Hormozgan province, Iran. Its capital the city of Rudan. (Note: Formerly Dehbarez)

== History ==
After the 2006 National Census, the village of Bikah was elevated to the status of a city. In 2017, the village of Balashahr in Jaghin District rose to city status as well.

In 2019, Eslamabad Rural District was created in Bikah District, and Berentin Rural District was separated from it to join the Central District.

== Demographics ==
=== Population ===
At the time of the 2006 census, the county's population was 104,222 in 21,923 households. The following census in 2011 counted 118,547 people in 29,066 households. The 2016 census measured the population of the county as 124,522 in 34,561 households.

=== Administrative divisions ===
Rudan County's population history and administrative structure over three consecutive censuses are shown in the following table.

Rudan County Population
| Administrative Divisions | 2006 | 2011 | 2016 |
|---|---|---|---|
| Central District | 52,816 | 59,660 | 63,616 |
| Abnama RD | 17,855 | 20,662 | 22,271 |
| Berentin RD | | | |
| Faryab RD | 2,495 | 3,077 | 2,922 |
| Rahdar RD | 2,406 | 2,636 | 2,302 |
| Rudan (city) | 30,060 | 33,285 | 36,121 |
| Bikah District | 22,532 | 24,540 | 24,606 |
| Berentin RD | 8,328 | 9,032 | 8,684 |
| Bikah RD | 14,204 | 8,506 | 8,732 |
| Eslamabad RD (Note: Established after the 2016 census) | | | |
| Bikah (city) | | 7,002 | 7,190 |
| Jaghin District | 11,254 | 15,318 | 14,468 |
| Jaghin-e Jonubi RD | 4,083 | 5,249 | 5,086 |
| Jaghin-e Shomali RD | 7,171 | 10,069 | 9,382 |
| Balashahr (city) (Note: Formerly the village of Jaghin; became a city after the 2016 census) | | | |
| Rudkhaneh District | 17,620 | 19,029 | 21,606 |
| Mosaferabad RD | 5,111 | 5,069 | 6,727 |
| Rudkhaneh RD | 2,572 | 2,643 | 3,338 |
| Rudkhaneh Bar RD | 7,431 | 8,242 | 8,862 |
| Ziarat-e Ali (city) | 2,506 | 3,075 | 2,679 |
| Total | 104,222 | 118,547 | 124,522 |
RD = Rural District

== See also ==
Media related to Rudan County at Wikimedia Commons
