= Shahr-e Kohneh =

Shahr-e Kohneh (Persian: شهركهنه, meaning "Old Town") may refer to:

- Shahr-e Kohneh, Hormozgan
- Shahr Kohneh, Khuzestan
- Shahr-e Kohneh, Nishapur, Razavi Khorasan Province
- Shahr-e Kohneh, Miyan Jolgeh, Nishapur County, Razavi Khorasan Province
- Shahr-e Kohneh, Quchan, Razavi Khorasan Province

== See also ==
- Kohneh Shahr
- Kohneh Shahr, Razavi Khorasan
