= Chuj =

Chuj might refer to:

- A component of Slavic, for example Russian and Polish, profanity
- Chuj language, a Mayan language spoken in western Guatemala and southern Mexico
- Chuj people, speakers of the Chuj language
- Chuj, Iran, a village in Hormozgan Province, Iran
- Chuj (bathhouse), a traditional steam bath used in Guatemala

== See also ==
- Chuj climbing salamander Dendrotriton chujorum
