= Kulaghan =

Kulaghan (Persian: كولغان), also rendered as Kulaqan, may refer to:

- Kulaghan-e Dartujan
- Kulaghan-e Tuman-e Abdollah
- Kulaghan-e Tuman-e Gholam Hasan
