= Gowdu =

Gowdu (Persian: گودو) may refer to:

- Gowdu, Bandar Abbas
- Gowdu, Minab
