= Gol Malek =

Gol Malek (Persian: گل ملك) may refer to:

- Gol Malek, Hormozgan
- Gol Malek, Kerman
