= Sarchil =

Sarchil or Sar Chil (Persian: سرچيل) may refer to:

- Sarchil, Hormozgan
- Sar Chil, Kerman
