= National Register of Historic Places listings in Choctaw County, Oklahoma =

Location of Choctaw County in Oklahoma

This is a list of the National Register of Historic Places listings in Choctaw County, Oklahoma.

This is intended to be a complete list of the properties and districts on the National Register of Historic Places in Choctaw County, Oklahoma, United States. The locations of National Register properties and districts for which the latitude and longitude coordinates are included below, may be seen in a map.

There are 13 properties and districts listed on the National Register in the county.

This National Park Service list is complete through NPS recent listings posted March 14, 2025.

== Current listings ==
	Name on the Register	Image	Date listed	Location	City or town	Description
1	Chief's House		June 21, 1971 (#71000660)	1.5 miles northeast of Swink; 34°01′23″N 95°10′54″W	Swink	Built for the Appuckshunubbe District Chief, the 1830 Treaty of Dancing Rabbit Creek provided for its construction. This house at Swink is the only house still on its original site in existence from that era. Maintained by the Swink Historical Preservation Association, it is open by appointment. (2011)
2	Doaksville Site		May 29, 1975 (#75001561)	Address Restricted	Fort Towson	
3	Everidge Cabin and Cemetery		March 31, 1982 (#82003674)	Off the railroad line 33°56′34″N 95°21′19″W	Hugo	
4	Fort Towson		September 29, 1970 (#70000531)	1 mile northeast of Fort Towson; 34°01′34″N 95°15′08″W	Fort Towson	
5	Hugo Armory	Hugo Armory	September 8, 1988 (#88001378)	Jefferson and 3rd Sts. 34°00′30″N 95°30′36″W	Hugo	
6	Hugo Frisco Railroad Depot	Hugo Frisco Railroad Depot	June 6, 1980 (#80003259)	N. A and Jackson Sts. 34°00′43″N 95°30′53″W	Hugo	
7	Hugo Historic District	Hugo Historic District	November 12, 1980 (#80003260)	U.S. Routes 70 and 271; 34°00′39″N 95°30′46″W	Hugo	
8	Hugo Public Library		September 8, 1988 (#88001379)	703 E. Jackson St. 34°00′39″N 95°30′17″W	Hugo	Building replaced by the Choctaw County Public Library in 2004.
9	Rose Hill Plantation	Rose Hill Plantation	March 15, 2010 (#10000069)	Address Restricted	Hugo	
10	Speer School		September 8, 1988 (#88001380)	Off U.S. Route 271 east on a county road 34°06′49″N 95°32′54″W	Hugo	
11	Spencer Academy		May 21, 1975 (#75001562)	10 miles north of Fort Towson; 34°08′51″N 95°21′37″W	Fort Towson	
12	Spencerville School Campus		September 8, 1988 (#88001381)	South of Spencerville; 34°08′31″N 95°22′13″W	Spencerville	
13	Willie W. Wilson House		April 20, 1982 (#82003673)	Northeastern corner of the junction of Cincinnati Ave. and Main St. 34°01′15″N 95°15′55″W	Fort Towson	

== See also ==
- List of National Historic Landmarks in Oklahoma
- National Register of Historic Places listings in Oklahoma
