= Khuy =

Khuy may refer to:

- Khuy, West Azerbaijan Province, a city in Iran
- Khvan, a village in Iran
- An obscene Russian, Ukrainian and Polish word (chuj)
- Khuy, a controversial song by the Russian punk band Instruktsiya po Vyzhivaniyu, written in 1989
- Khuy, nomarch of Abydos during the reign of Pepi I Meryre in the 24th Century BC.
