= HUJ =

Huj or HUJ may refer to:

- Huj, Gaza (Arabic: هوج), Palestinian village, depopulated by Israel in 1948
- Guz (Persian: گز, Hindi: गज), a unit of length
- Northern Guiyang Miao language, spoken in China
- Stan Stamper Municipal Airport, serving Hugo, Oklahoma, United States
- huj/chuj, Polish profanity
