= Khvor Chah =

Khvor Chah or Khvorchah or Khur Chah (Persian: خورچاه) may refer to:

- Khvorchah, Bandar Abbas
- Khvor Chah, Bandar Lengeh
