= Madong-e Ahmad =

Madngg Ahmad مدنگ احمد
- Village
- Location within Iran
- Coordinates: 27°21′32″N 56°37′17″E
- Country: Iran
- Province: Hormozgan
- County: Bandar Abbas
- Bakhsh: Qaleh Qazi
- Rural District: Qaleh Qazi

Population (2006)
  - Total: 61
- Time zone: UTC+3:30 (IRST)
  - Summer (DST): UTC+4:30 (IRDT)

Madong-e Ahmad (Persian: مدنگ احمد, also Romanized as Madong-e Aḩmad) is a village in Qaleh Qazi Rural District, Qaleh Qazi District, Bandar Abbas County, Hormozgan Province, Iran. At the 2006 census, its population was 61, in 9 families.
