= Dehnow-e Pain, Hormozgan =

Village in Hormozgan province, Iran

Dehnow-e Pain Persian: دهنو پائين
- Village
- Location within Iran
- Coordinates: 27°20′36″N 56°32′29″E
- Country: Iran
- Province: Hormozgan
- County: Bandar Abbas
- District: Qaleh Qazi
- Rural District: Dehnow

Population (2016)
  - Total: 2,338
- Time zone: UTC+3:30 (IRST)

Dehnow-e Pain (Persian: دهنوپائين) (Note: Also romanized as Dehnow-e Pā’īn; also known as Dehnow) is a village in, and the capital of, Dehnow Rural District of Qaleh Qazi District, Bandar Abbas County, Hormozgan province, Iran. The village is about 20km northeast of Bandar Abbas, served by Road 94.

== Demographics ==
=== Population ===
At the time of the 2006 National Census, the village's population was 1,884 in 349 households, when it was in Qaleh Qazi Rural District. The following census in 2011 counted 2,011 people in 511 households, by which time the village had been transferred to Dehnow Rural District created in the district. The 2016 census measured the population of the village as 2,338 people in 639 households. It was the most populous village in its rural district.
