= Chah Faleh =

Chah Faleh (Persian: چاه فعله) may refer to:

- Chah Faleh-ye Gharbi
- Chah Faleh-ye Sharqi
