= Khvorchah, Bandar Abbas =

Village in Hormozgan, Iran

Khvorchah خورچاه
- Village
- Location within Iran
- Coordinates: 27°23′05″N 56°32′12″E
- Country: Iran
- Province: Hormozgan
- County: Bandar Abbas
- Bakhsh: Qaleh Qazi
- Rural District: Qaleh Qazi

Population (2006)
  - Total: 664
- Time zone: UTC+3:30 (IRST)
  - Summer (DST): UTC+4:30 (IRDT)

Khvorchah (Persian: خورچاه, also Romanized as Khvorchāh and Khūr Chāh) is a village in Qaleh Qazi Rural District, Qaleh Qazi District, Bandar Abbas County, Hormozgan Province, Iran. At the 2006 census, its population was 664, in 140 families.
