= Kulaghan-e Tuman-e Gholam Hasan =

Kulaghan-e Tuman-e Gholam Hasan كولغان طومان غلام حسن
- Village
- Location within Iran
- Coordinates: 27°12′00″N 56°37′12″E
- Country: Iran
- Province: Hormozgan
- County: Bandar Abbas
- Bakhsh: Qaleh Qazi
- Rural District: Qaleh Qazi

Population (2006)
  - Total: 34
- Time zone: UTC+3:30 (IRST)
  - Summer (DST): UTC+4:30 (IRDT)

Kulaghan-e Tuman-e Gholam Hasan (Persian: كولغان طومان غلام حسن, also Romanized as Kūlaghān-e Tūmān-e Gholām Ḩasan; also known as Kūlaqān-e Kūchak) is a village in Qaleh Qazi Rural District, Qaleh Qazi District, Bandar Abbas County, Hormozgan Province, Iran. At the 2006 census, its population was 34, in 6 families.
