= Chuj, Iran =

Village in Hormozgan, Iran

Chuj چوج
- Village
- Location within Iran
- Coordinates: 27°19′20″N 56°30′47″E
- Country: Iran
- Province: Hormozgan
- County: Bandar Abbas
- Bakhsh: Qaleh Qazi
- Rural District: Qaleh Qazi

Population (2006)
  - Total: 137
- Time zone: UTC+3:30 (IRST)
  - Summer (DST): UTC+4:30 (IRDT)

Chuj (Persian: چوج, also Romanized as Chūj; also known as Chūch) is a village in Qaleh Qazi Rural District, Qaleh Qazi District, Bandar Abbas County, Hormozgan Province, Iran. At the 2006 census, its population was 137, in 35 families.
