= Rose Hill Plantation (Hugo, Oklahoma) =

Historic plantation in Oklahoma, United States

- U.S. National Register of Historic Places
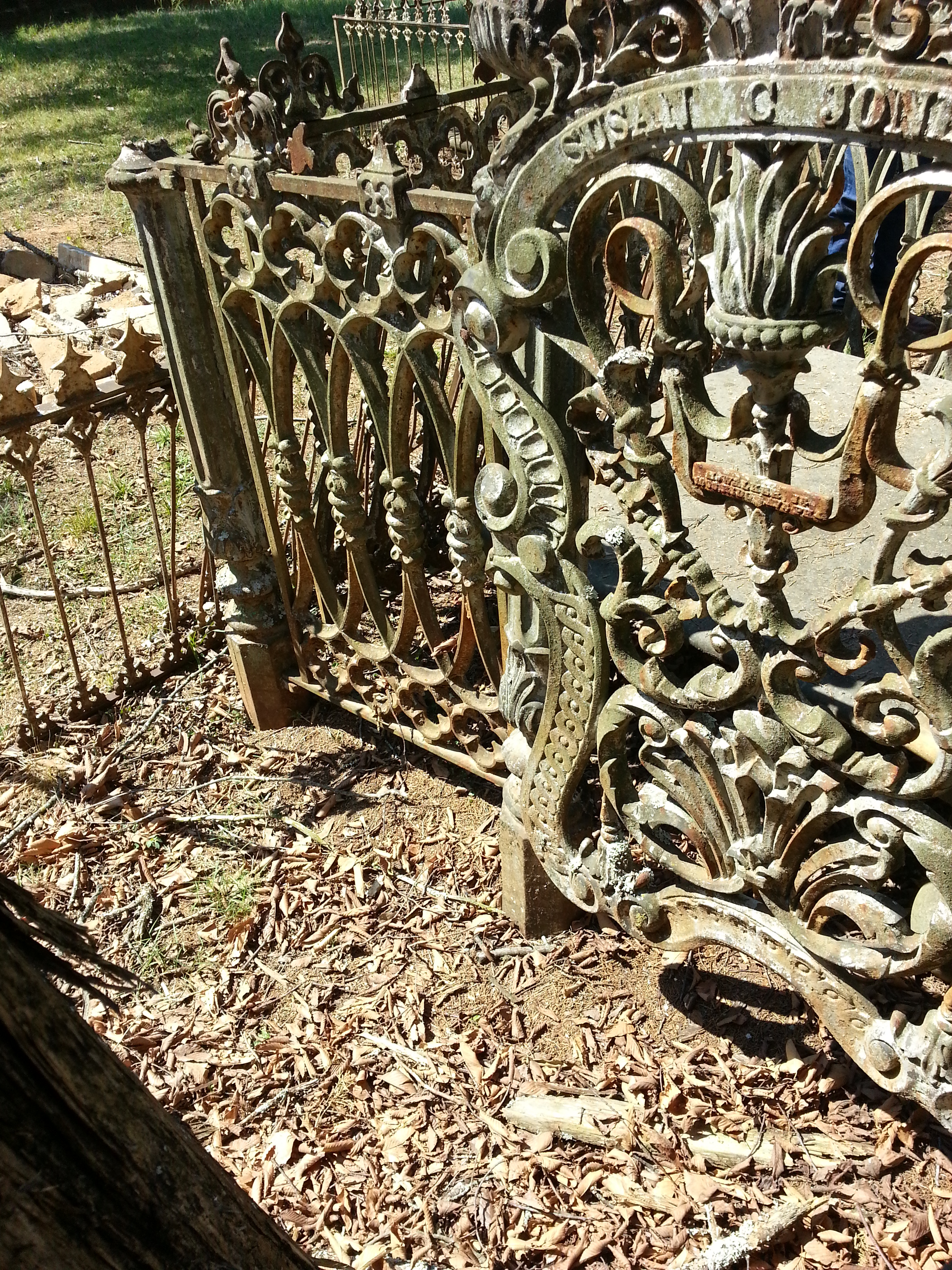
- Cemetery at Rose Hill Plantation, August 2012.

- Location within Oklahoma Location within the United States
- Location: Address restricted
- Coordinates: 33°58′36.9″N 95°27′05.9″W
- Architectural style: Choctaw
- NRHP reference No.: 10000069
- Added to NRHP: 2010

The Rose Hill Plantation is a historic plantation located in Hugo, Oklahoma, United States. It was added to the National Register of Historic Places in 2010. The slave plantation is notable for having been owned by Choctaw Nation senator and Confederate politician Robert McDonald Jones.

== See also ==
- National Register of Historic Places listings in Choctaw County, Oklahoma
