= Sarchil, Hormozgan =

Sarchil سرچيل
- Village
- Location within Iran
- Coordinates: 27°20′31″N 56°40′02″E
- Country: Iran
- Province: Hormozgan
- County: Bandar Abbas
- Bakhsh: Qaleh Qazi
- Rural District: Qaleh Qazi

Population (2006)
  - Total: 145
- Time zone: UTC+3:30 (IRST)
  - Summer (DST): UTC+4:30 (IRDT)

Sarchil (Persian: سرچيل, also Romanized as Sarchīl; also known as Sarchīl Jalābī and Sarchīl Jallābī) is a village in Qaleh Qazi Rural District, Qaleh Qazi District, Bandar Abbas County, Hormozgan Province, Iran. At the 2006 census, its population was 145, in 32 families.
