= Shahr-e Kohneh, Hormozgan =

Village in Hormozgan, Iran

Shahr-e Kohneh شهر كهنه
- Village
- Location within Iran
- Coordinates: 27°26′31″N 56°34′10″E
- Country: Iran
- Province: Hormozgan
- County: Bandar Abbas
- Bakhsh: Qaleh Qazi
- Rural District: Qaleh Qazi

Population (2006)
  - Total: 661
- Time zone: UTC+3:30 (IRST)
  - Summer (DST): UTC+4:30 (IRDT)

Shahr-e Kohneh (Persian: شهر كهنه) is a village in Qaleh Qazi Rural District, Qaleh Qazi District, Bandar Abbas County, Hormozgan Province, Iran. At the 2006 census, its population was 661, in 136 families.
