= K-word =

K-word may refer to:

- Kaffir (racial term), a racial slur used in South Africa
- Kike, an antisemitic ethnic slur
- Keling, a racial slur to denote a person originating from the Indian subcontinent, including overseas Indians
- Khokhol, a racial slur used in Russia against Ukrainians.
- Kurwa, a profanity in Polish
- KWord, a deprecated word processor and desktop publishing application
- KWRD-FM, a Christian radio station in Texas
- "K-Word", a song by JID and Pastor Troy from God Does Like Ugly

== See also ==
- Karen (slang), a slang term aimed towards impolite and sometimes racist women
