= Chah Faleh-ye Sharqi =

Village in Hormozgan, Iran

Chah Faleh-ye Sharqi چاه فعله شرقي
- Village
- Location within Iran
- Coordinates: 27°21′33″N 56°38′08″E
- Country: Iran
- Province: Hormozgan
- County: Bandar Abbas
- Bakhsh: Qaleh Qazi
- Rural District: Qaleh Qazi

Population (2006)
  - Total: 363
- Time zone: UTC+3:30 (IRST)
  - Summer (DST): UTC+4:30 (IRDT)

Chah Faleh-ye Sharqi (Persian: چاه فعله شرقي, also Romanized as Chāh Fa‘leh-ye Sharqī; also known as Chāh Fa‘leh and Chāh Qal‘eh) is a village in Qaleh Qazi Rural District, Qaleh Qazi District, Bandar Abbas County, Hormozgan Province, Iran. At the 2006 census, its population was 363, in 79 families.
