= Gol Malek, Hormozgan =

Gol Malek گل ملك
- Village
- Location within Iran
- Coordinates: 27°22′08″N 56°33′01″E
- Country: Iran
- Province: Hormozgan
- County: Bandar Abbas
- Bakhsh: Qaleh Qazi
- Rural District: Qaleh Qazi

Population (2006)
  - Total: 500
- Time zone: UTC+3:30 (IRST)
  - Summer (DST): UTC+4:30 (IRDT)

Gol Malek (Persian: گل ملك; also known as Galm Malek and Kam Malek) is a village in Qaleh Qazi Rural District, Qaleh Qazi District, Bandar Abbas County, Hormozgan Province, Iran. At the 2006 census, its population was 500, in 100 families.
