= Khuy voyne! =

2003 anti-war neologism

t.A.T.u. in the famous "Khuy Voyne!" shirts. This style was worn on The Tonight Show with Jay Leno, while short-sleeve T-shirts with typed serif text were worn on Jimmy Kimmel Live! and TRL, and short-sleeve T-shirts with the original text style were worn on Last Call with Carson Daly.

Khuy voyne! (also transliterated as Hui voine; Russian: Хуй войне!, IPA: [ˈxuj vɐjˈnʲe], lit. 'Dick to the war' which can be translated as 'Fuck war,' meaning 'no to the war' without sexual connotation) is a pacifist phrase. It was first used publicly by Russian pop duo t.A.T.u. on February 25th, 2003, during a performance of "All the Things She Said" on NBC's The Tonight Show with Jay Leno.

== Origins and the Iraq War ==
Around the time of t.A.T.u.'s performance, anti-war narratives were actively suppressed by major United States television broadcasters as the nation prepared for the Iraq War. Prior to the invasion of Iraq, many significant figures in American pop culture spoke out against the potential start of war. In December 2002, more than 100 influential Hollywood actors, directors, and producers formed the group Artists United to Win Without War. The group later released an open letter to President George W. Bush expressing their opposition to the war.

During a performance with Kid Rock at the 45th Grammy Awards, Sheryl Crow wore a large peace sign and a guitar strap bearing the slogan "No War." Following Crow's statement, an American promoter suggested to t.A.T.u.'s producer Ivan Shapovalov that the duo incorporate an anti-war statement into their performance on The Tonight Show with Jay Leno, though it was Shapovalov who decided to use "Khuy Voyne" instead of "No War." On their February 25th, 2003, performance on The Tonight Show, t.A.T.u. mocked NBC's insistence that they neither kiss nor comment on the Iraq War by performing "All the Things She Said" from their first English album 200 km/h in the Wrong Lane in white T-shirts that bore the slogan across the front, and by blocking their faces with their hands as they kissed during a break in their performance. The stunt prompted NBC to ban t.A.T.u. from any future performances, though it did also help the duo's international record sales.

The documentary Anatomy of t.A.T.u. states that when the slogan was being created, Shapovalov said that it is a Russian slang way to say "No to War" (Нет войне!), however the slang translations may vary to "Dick to War" (word-by-word) or a creative way of saying "Fuck War".

== Usage during Russo-Ukrainian war ==
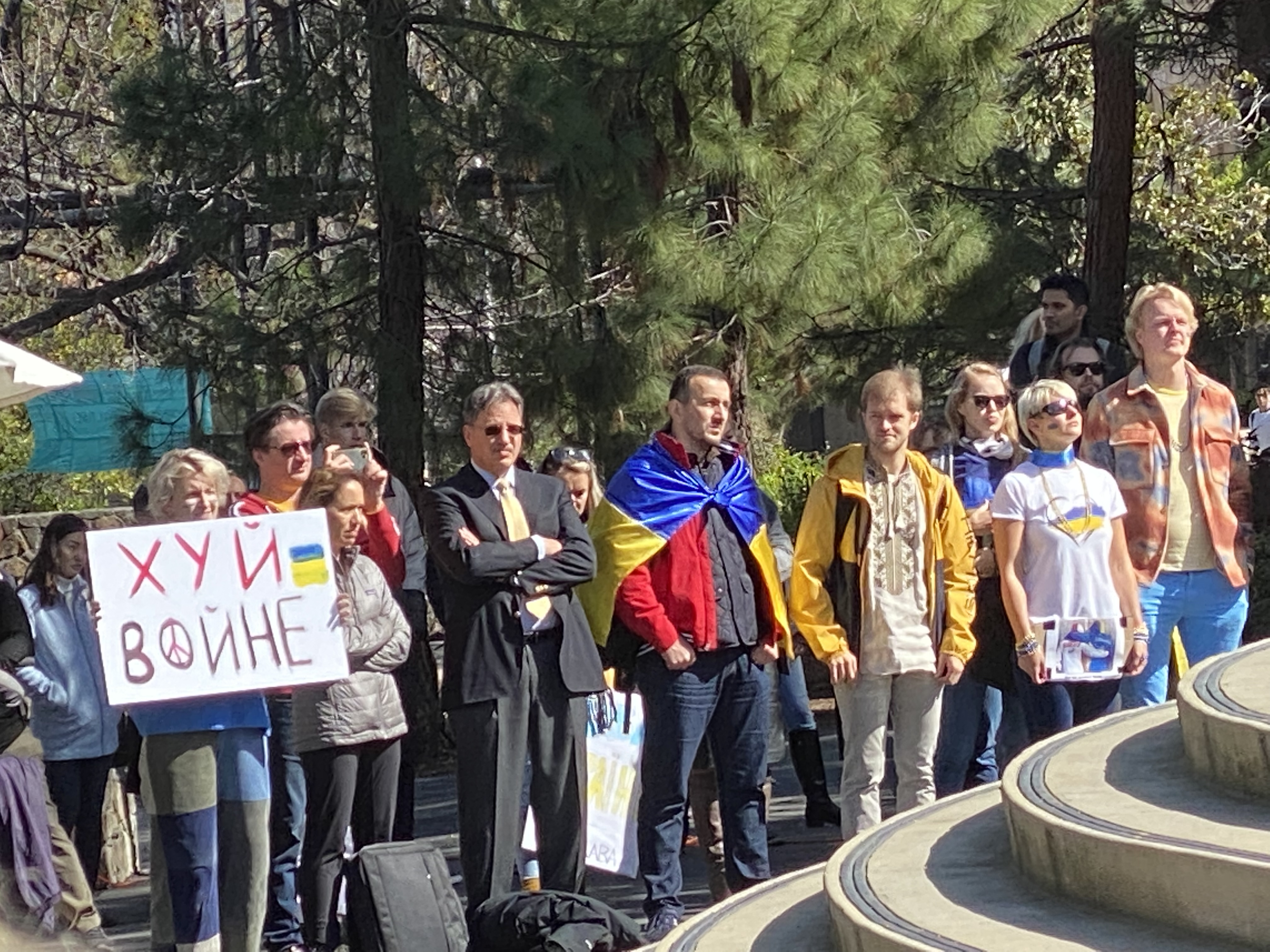
A rally in support of Ukraine, organized at Stanford

Following the Russian invasion of Ukraine in 2022, the phrase became an anti-war slogan (along with “No to War” — «Нет войне»), often used at protest rallies both within and outside Russia. The Russian online media outlet Mediazona later launched a podcast of the same name.

On May 22nd, 2022, audience members at a Kis-kis concert in Saint Petersburg chanted "Khuy Voyne!". Video footage of the moment went viral.

In October 2022, activist Regina Mishchenko was arrested in Saint Petersburg for wearing a T-shirt with the slogan "Khuy Voyne." In January 2023, she was issued a fine of 50,000 rubles, at the time equivalent to US$587.12.

== See also ==
- Opposition to the Iraq War
