= Patrick W. O'Reilly =

American lawyer and politician (1925–2020)

Patrick Wayne O'Reilly

Member of the Arizona House of Representatives
- In office 1955–1956

Personal details
- Born: May 1, 1925 Hugo, Oklahoma, U.S.
- Died: May 1, 2020 (aged 95) Phoenix, Arizona, U.S.
- Party: Democratic

Patrick Wayne O'Reilly (May 1, 1925 – May 1, 2020) was an American lawyer and politician.

O'Reilly was born in Hugo, Oklahoma, In 1932, O'Reilly moved with his family to Arizona and eventually settled in Wickenburg, Arizona. He graduated from the Wickenburg High School and then was involved with the mining and railroad businesses. O'Reilly served in the United States Navy during World War II. O'Reilly then received his bachelor's and law degrees from the University of Arizona. He practiced law in Phoenix, Arizona. O'Reilly served in the Arizona House of Representatives in 1955 and 1956 as a Democrat. He died in Phoenix, Arizona.
