= Dehnow Rural District (Bandar Abbas County) =

Rural district in Hormozgan province, Iran

Dehnow Rural District Persian: دهستان دهنو
- Rural District
- Location within Iran
- Coordinates: 27°17′07″N 56°37′12″E
- Country: Iran
- Province: Hormozgan
- County: Bandar Abbas
- District: Qaleh Qazi
- Capital: Dehnow-e Pain

Population (2016)
  - Total: 5,234
- Time zone: UTC+3:30 (IRST)

Dehnow Rural District (Persian: دهستان دهنو) is in Qaleh Qazi District of Bandar Abbas County, Hormozgan province, Iran. Its capital is the village of Dehnow-e Pain.

== History ==
The Dehnow Rural District was created in Qaleh Qazi District after the 2006 National Census.

== Demographics ==
=== Population ===
At the time of the 2011 census, the rural district's population was 4,598 in 1,120 households. The 2016 census measured the population of the rural district as 5,234 in 1,381 households. The most populous of its nine villages was Dehnow-e Pain, with 2,338 people.
