= Chah Faleh-ye Gharbi =

Village in Hormozgan province, Iran

Chah Faleh-ye Gharbi Persian: چاه فعله غربي
- Village
- Location within Iran
- Coordinates: 27°21′20″N 56°37′11″E
- Country: Iran
- Province: Hormozgan
- County: Bandar Abbas
- District: Qaleh Qazi
- Rural District: Qaleh Qazi

Population (2016)
  - Total: 712
- Time zone: UTC+3:30 (IRST)

Chah Faleh-ye Gharbi (Persian: چاه فعله غربي) (Note: Also romanized as Chāh Fa‘leh-ye Gharbī; also known as Chāh Barrā) is a village in Qaleh Qazi Rural District of Qaleh Qazi District, Bandar Abbas County, Hormozgan province, Iran.

== Demographics ==
=== Population ===
At the time of the 2006 National Census, the village's population was 583 in 139 households. The following census in 2011 counted 636 people in 173 households. The 2016 census measured the population of the village as 712 people in 210 households. It was the most populous village in its rural district.
