= Qaleh Qazi, Hormozgan =

City in Hormozgan province, Iran

Qaleh Qazi Persian: قلعه قاضي
- City
- Location within Iran
- Coordinates: 27°26′39″N 56°32′43″E
- Country: Iran
- Province: Hormozgan
- County: Bandar Abbas
- District: Qaleh Qazi

Population (2016)
  - Total: 5,286
- Time zone: UTC+3:30 (IRST)

Qaleh Qazi (Persian: قلعه قاضي) (Note: Also romanized as Qal’eh Qāzī, Qal’eh Qāẕī, Qal‘eh-i-Qāzi, and Qal‘eh-ye Qāzī; also known as Qal’eh Qāzī-ye Bālā) is a city in, and the capital of, Qaleh Qazi District of Bandar Abbas County, Hormozgan province, Iran. It also serves as the administrative center for Qaleh Qazi Rural District.

== Demographics ==
=== Population ===
At the time of the 2006 National Census, Qaleh Qazi's population was 4,239 in 1,000 households, when it was a village in Qaleh Qazi Rural District. The following census in 2011 counted 5,183 people in 1,356 households, by which time the village had been elevated to the status of a city. The 2016 census measured the population of the city as 5,286 people in 1,440 households.
