= Hugo Historic District =

Historic district in Oklahoma, United States

- U.S. National Register of Historic Places
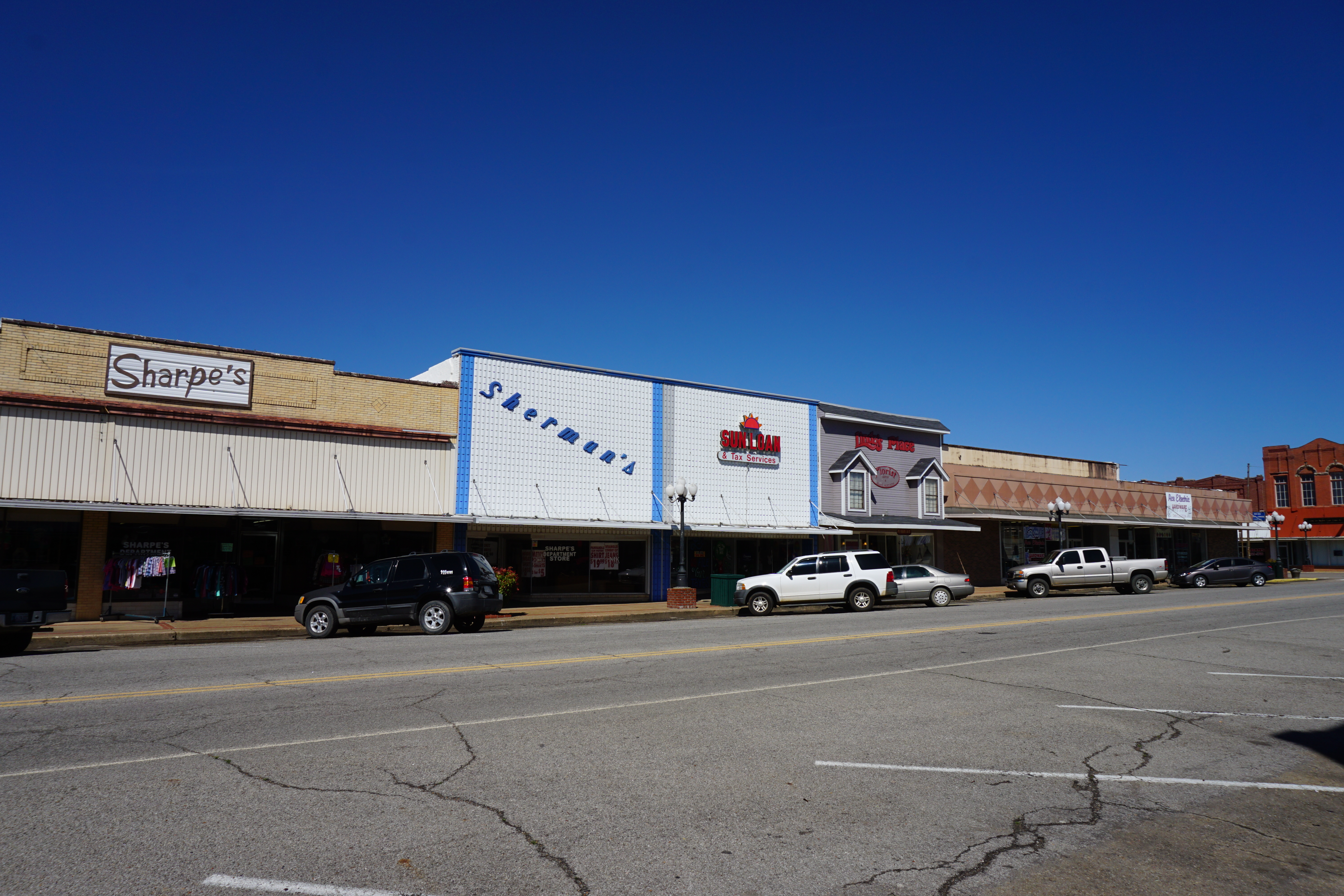

- Location within Oklahoma
- Location: U.S. 70 and U.S. 271, Hugo, Oklahoma
- Coordinates: 34°00′39″N 95°30′46″W
- Area: 20 acres (8.1 ha)
- Built by: Multiple
- NRHP reference No.: 80003260
- Added to NRHP: November 12, 1980

The Hugo Historic District in Hugo, Oklahoma is a 20 acres (8.1 ha) historic district which was listed on the National Register of Historic Places listings in Choctaw County, Oklahoma in 1980. It is located at U.S. 70 and U.S. 271.

The district is a 12 block area including 64 buildings, most built between 1900 and 1920. The largest building is a 40,000 square feet (0.37 ha) railroad depot building built in 1913.
