= Joseph Fleck =

American painter

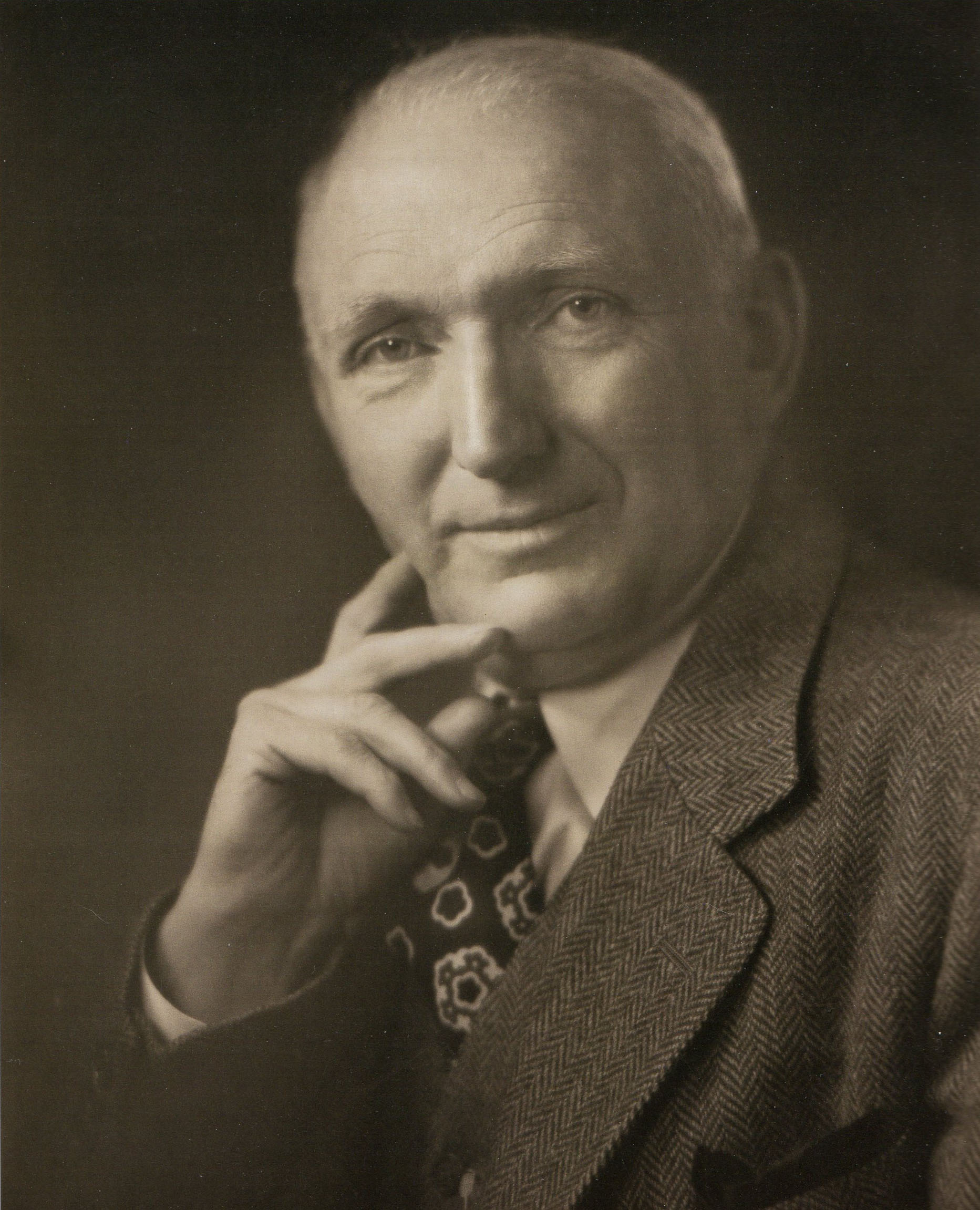
- Picture of Fleck c. 1945
- Born: August 25, 1892; Sigless, Austria-Hungary
- Died: April 7, 1977 (aged 84); Pleasanton, California, United States
- Education: Academy of Fine Arts Vienna
- Known for: Painting
- Notable work: Fiesta Array, Taos (1929); Amarilla (1929); Geraniums (1928); Winter, Spring, Summer, and Fall on the Campus (1944-1945)
- Movement: Regionalism, Social realism, American modernism, American realism, Synchromism
- Awards: Arizona State Fair (1928); Kansas City Art Institute (1929); Leon Gaspard Memorial Prize (1964); New Mexico State Fair (1965)
- Patrons: Thomas Hart Benton; Ernest L. Blumenschein

Joseph Amadeus Fleck (August 25, 1892 – April 5, 1977) was an American painter and muralist. His works include The Red Man of Oklahoma Sees the First Stage Coach, in Hugo, Oklahoma, and First Mail Crossing Raton Pass and Unloading the Mail in Raton, in Raton, New Mexico.

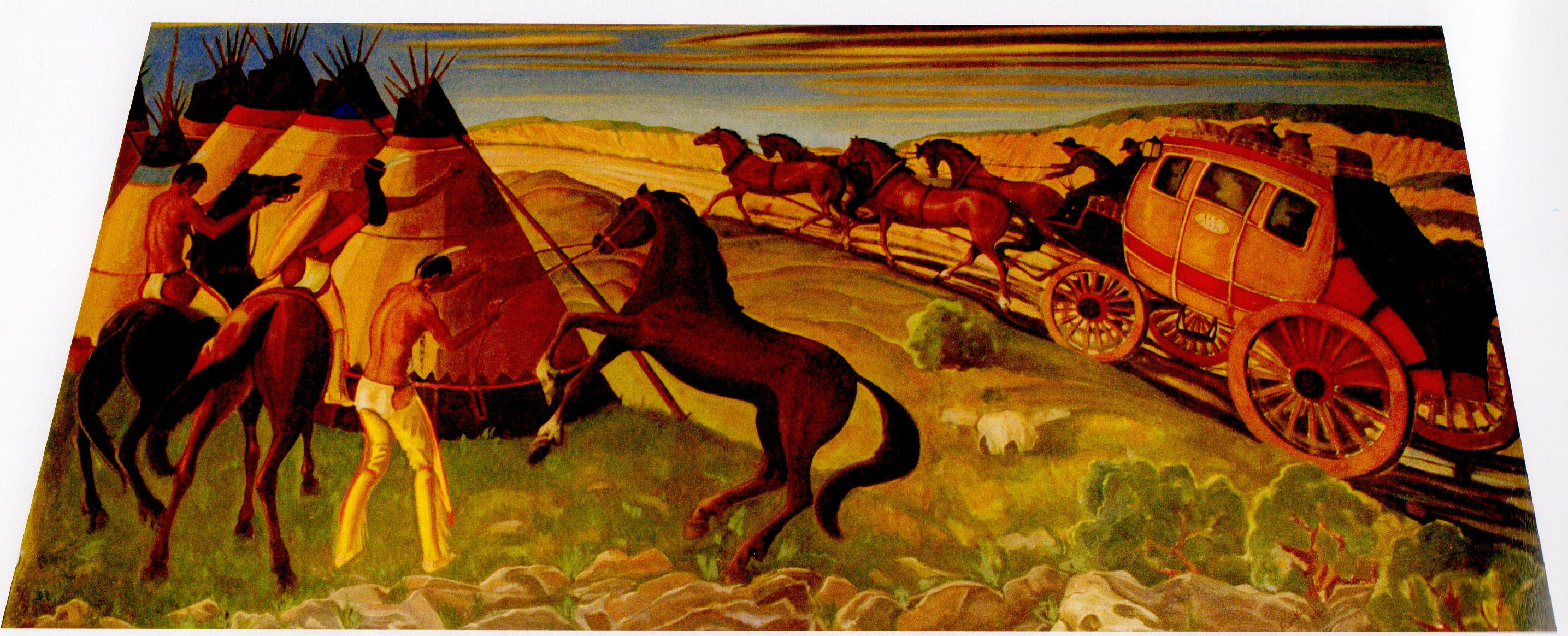
The Red Man of Oklahoma Sees the First Stage Coach (1936). Originally hanging in the Hugo, Oklahoma, U.S. Post Office in 1936, the mural now resides at the Oklahoma School System Administration Building

== Biography ==
Joseph A. Fleck was born in Austria in 1892 and received his academic training at the Royal Viennese Art Academy and Royal Art Academy in Munich. He moved to Kansas City, Missouri in 1922 and then settled in Taos, New Mexico in 1925. From 1942 to 1946 he was Dean of Fine Arts and artist in residence at the University of Missouri in Kansas City.

== Awards ==
- Arizona State Fair, First Prize, 1928
- Kansas City Art Institute, 1923, 1929, 1934 (prize)
- Art Institute of Chicago, 1927 (prize)
