= Shahr Kohneh, Khuzestan =

Shahr Kohneh شهركهنه
- Village
- Location within Iran
- Coordinates: 30°19′47″N 50°07′26″E
- Country: Iran
- Province: Khuzestan
- County: Behbahan
- Bakhsh: Zeydun
- Rural District: Dorunak

Population (2006)
  - Total: 152
- Time zone: UTC+3:30 (IRST)
  - Summer (DST): UTC+4:30 (IRDT)

Shahr Kohneh (Persian: شهركهنه; also known as Shahrī-ye Kohneh) is a village in Dorunak Rural District, Zeydun District, Behbahan County, Khuzestan Province, Iran. At the 2006 census, its population was 152, in 37 families.
