= Sar Chil, Kerman =

Sar Chil سرچيل
- Village
- Location within Iran
- Coordinates: 29°01′19″N 57°36′53″E
- Country: Iran
- Province: Kerman
- County: Jiroft
- Bakhsh: Sarduiyeh
- Rural District: Dalfard

Population (2006)
  - Total: 34
- Time zone: UTC+3:30 (IRST)
  - Summer (DST): UTC+4:30 (IRDT)

Sar Chil (Persian: سرچيل, also Romanized as Sar Chīl) is a village in Dalfard Rural District, Sarduiyeh District, Jiroft County, Kerman Province, Iran. At the 2006 census, its population was 34, in 9 families.
