= Kohneh Shahr =

Kohneh Shahr كهنه شهر
- Village
- Location within Iran
- Coordinates: 27°14′50″N 56°43′46″E
- Country: Iran
- Province: Hormozgan
- County: Minab
- Bakhsh: Central
- Rural District: Band-e Zarak

Population (2006)
  - Total: 1,281
- Time zone: UTC+3:30 (IRST)
  - Summer (DST): UTC+4:30 (IRDT)

Kohneh Shahr (Persian: كهنه شهر) is a village in Band-e Zarak Rural District, in the Central District of Minab County, Hormozgan Province, Iran. At the 2006 census, its population was 1,281, in 248 families.
