= Khvor Chah, Bandar Lengeh =

Khvor Chah خورچاه
- Village
- Location within Iran
- Coordinates: 27°00′55″N 54°50′51″E
- Country: Iran
- Province: Hormozgan
- County: Bandar Lengeh
- Bakhsh: Central
- Rural District: Mehran

Population (2006)
  - Total: 401
- Time zone: UTC+3:30 (IRST)
  - Summer (DST): UTC+4:30 (IRDT)

Khvor Chah (Persian: خورچاه, also Romanized as Khvor Chāh) is a village in Mehran Rural District, in the Central District of Bandar Lengeh County, Hormozgan Province, Iran. At the 2006 census, its population was 401, in 73 families.
