= Hugo Public Library =

- U.S. National Register of Historic Places
- Location within Oklahoma
- Location: E. Jefferson St., Hugo, Oklahoma
- Coordinates: 34.008345°N 95.510434°W
- Area: less than one acre
- Built: 1936-37
- Built by: Works Progress Administration
- MPS: WPA Public Bldgs., Recreational Facilities and Cemetery Improvements in Southeastern Oklahoma, 1935--1943 TR
- NRHP reference No.: 88001379
- Added to NRHP: September 8, 1988

The Hugo Public Library built in 1936–37, on E. Jefferson St. in Hugo, Oklahoma, was listed on the National Register of Historic Places in 1988. It was a Works Progress Administration project.

The importance of the project, in its time, was expressed starkly in the 1988 National Register nomination:

The library building is significant because it has served Hugo since its construction as a center of community activity. Indeed, immediately after it was built it was the regional headquarters of the WPA itself; later it was the site of agricultural fairs and the like. Architecturally it is unique in type, style, materials and workmanship. In the early days of the depression it also provided employment opportunities for destitute laborers with no hope of work in the private sector. In the Hugo area construction of it helped pr-event starvation.

The historic building is a one-story, irregular building about 53 by 75 feet (16 m × 23 m) in plan, built of uncut and uncoursed native stone. The historic building, on the southwest corner of W. Jefferson St. and S. 3rd St., survived still in 2013.

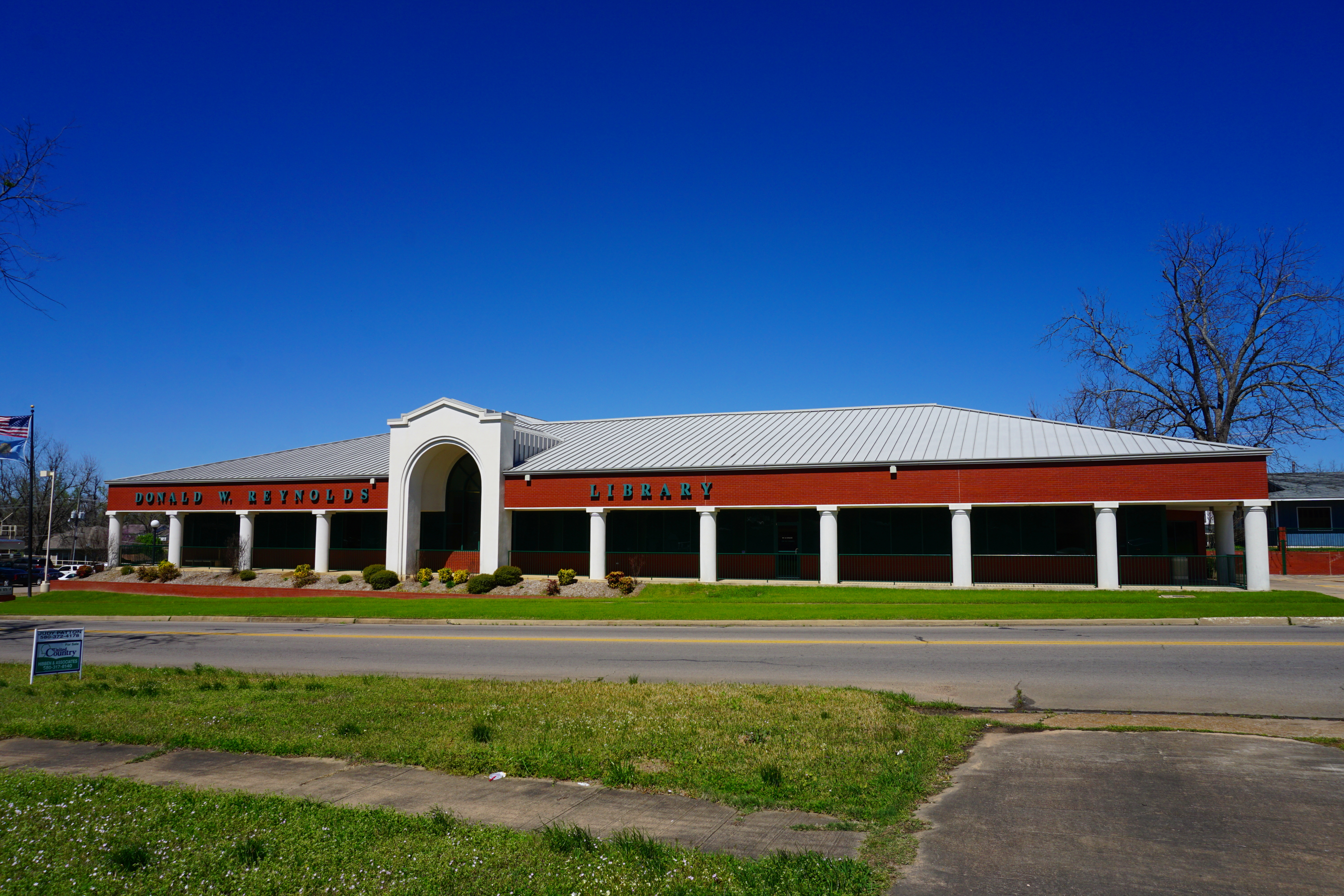
Replacement building

The city's library was moved to a new building, the Choctaw County Public Library, at 703 E. Jackson St. (northeast corner of E.Jackson and N. 7th St.), in 2004. It is now known as the Donald W. Reynolds Library.
