= Kulaghan-e Dartujan =

Kulaghan-e Dartujan كولغان درتوجان
- Village
- Location within Iran
- Coordinates: 27°22′46″N 56°47′29″E
- Country: Iran
- Province: Hormozgan
- County: Bandar Abbas
- Bakhsh: Takht
- Rural District: Shamil

Population (2006)
  - Total: 86
- Time zone: UTC+3:30 (IRST)
  - Summer (DST): UTC+4:30 (IRDT)

Kulaghan-e Dartujan (Persian: كولغان درتوجان, also Romanized as Kūlaghān-e Dartūjān; also known as Dartūjān, Koolghan, Kūlaqān, and Kūlaqān-e Dartūjān) is a village in Shamil Rural District, Takht District, Bandar Abbas County, Hormozgan Province, Iran. At the 2006 census, its population was 86, in 21 families.
