= Stan Stamper Municipal Airport =

Airport in Oklahoma, United States

- IATA: HUJ; ICAO: KHHW; FAA LID: HHW

Summary
- Airport type: Public
- Owner: City of Hugo
- Serves: Hugo, Oklahoma
- Elevation AMSL: 572 ft (174 m)
- Coordinates: 34°02′05″N 095°32′31″W
- Interactive map of Stan Stamper Municipal Airport

Runways
Direction	Length		Surface
Direction	ft	m	Surface
17/35	4,007	1,221	Asphalt

Statistics (2008)
- Aircraft operations: 1,250
- Based aircraft: 13
- Source: Federal Aviation Administration

Stan Stamper Municipal Airport (IATA: HUJ, ICAO: KHHW, FAA LID: HHW) is a city-owned, public-use airport located two nautical miles (3.7 km) northwest of the central business district of Hugo, a city in Choctaw County, Oklahoma, United States. According to the FAA's National Plan of Integrated Airport Systems for 2009–2013, it is classified as a general aviation airport.

Although many U.S. airports use the same three-letter location identifier for the FAA and IATA, this airport is assigned HHW by the FAA and HUJ by the IATA.

== History ==
The Hugo City Council named the airport after Stan Stamper, a local newspaper publisher, who served for 18 years as a member of the Oklahoma Aeronautics Commission. Stamper (1953-) is an accomplished aviator, with multiple aviation ratings, including Commercial, Instrument, Multi-Engine, and Flight Instructor ratings. He was named Aviator of the Year in Oklahoma in 1997 and was inducted into the Oklahoma Journalism Hall of Fame in 2012.

== Facilities and aircraft ==
Stan Stamper Municipal Airport covers an area of 167 acres (68 ha) at an elevation of 572 feet (174 m) above mean sea level. It has one runway designated 17/35 with an asphalt surface measuring 4,007 by 75 feet (1,221 x 23 m).

For the 12-month period ending June 26, 2008, the airport had 1,250 aircraft operations, an average of 104 per month: 96% general aviation and 4% military. At that time there were 13 aircraft based at this airport: 92% single-engine and 8% helicopter.

== See also ==
- List of airports in Oklahoma
