= Chuj (bathhouse) =

Traditional Mayan bathhouse

A chuj is a traditional Mayan bathhouse. It is a sweat bath or steam bath. Traditional chuj had stone walls and live sod roofs. Today, some chuj are made out of adobe bricks or cinder blocks instead.

Each family would build their own chuj near their house. A chuj has no windows. Inside, the bathers heat rocks until they are hot. Then they throw water onto the rocks to make steam. The bathers lie down on wooden beds. Users believe that the chuj cleans the body, spirit, and mind.
