= Gol Malek, Kerman =

Gol Malek گل ملك
- Village
- Location within Iran
- Coordinates: 29°05′46″N 57°54′44″E
- Country: Iran
- Province: Kerman
- County: Bam
- Bakhsh: Central
- Rural District: Deh Bakri

Population (2006)
  - Total: 143
- Time zone: UTC+3:30 (IRST)
  - Summer (DST): UTC+4:30 (IRDT)

Gol Malek (Persian: گل ملك; also known as Bol Malek) is a village in Deh Bakri Rural District, in the Central District of Bam County, Kerman Province, Iran. At the 2006 census, its population was 143, in 33 families.
