= Hugo, Oklahoma =

City in Oklahoma, US

- City
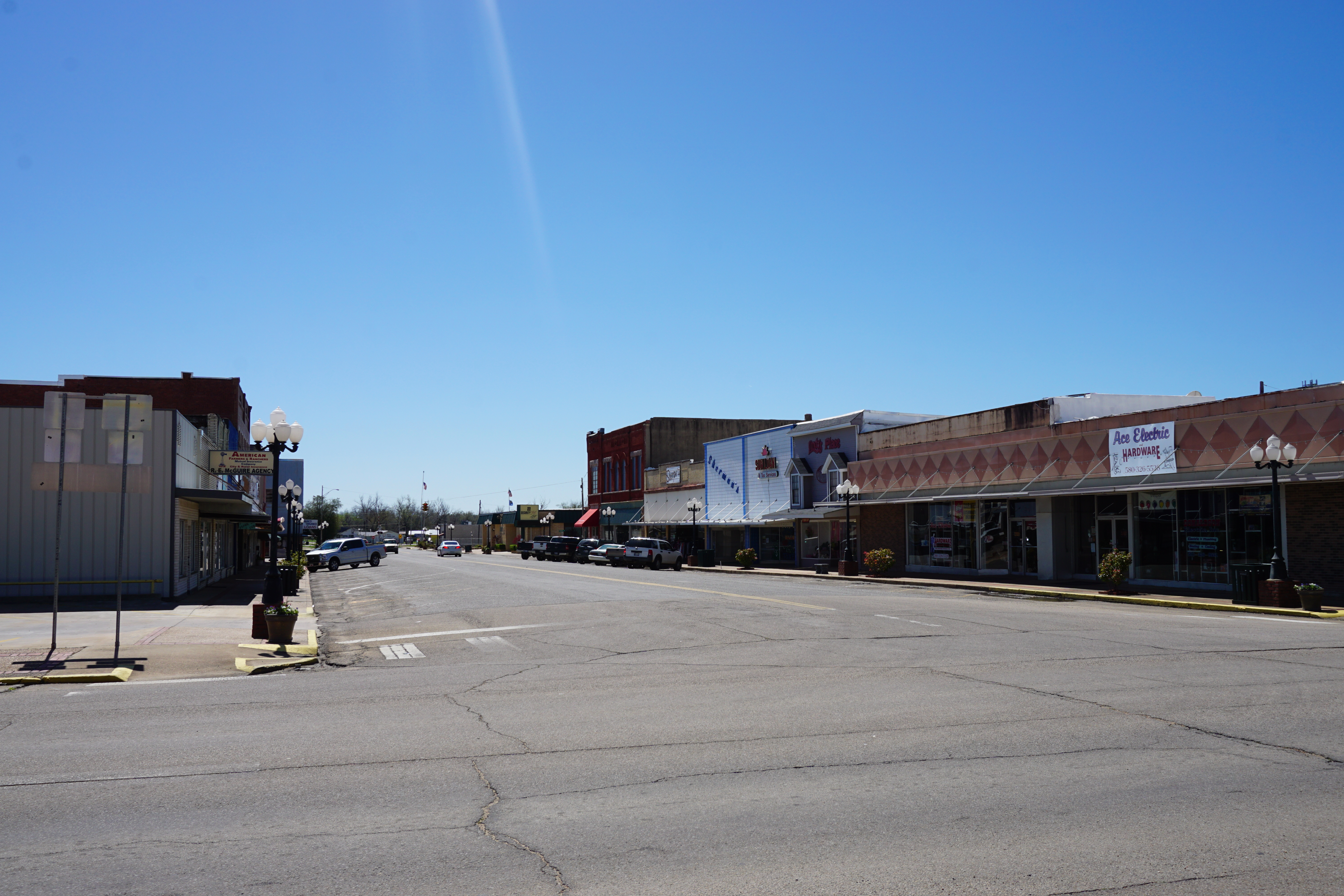
- Broadway Street in Hugo
- Nickname: Circus City, USA
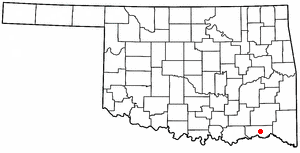
- Location of Hugo, Oklahoma
- Coordinates: 34°00′42″N 95°30′42″W
- Country: United States
- State: Oklahoma
- County: Choctaw

Area
  - Total: 6.33 sq mi (16.39 km^{2})
  - Land: 6.31 sq mi (16.34 km^{2})
  - Water: 0.019 sq mi (0.05 km^{2})
- Elevation: 551 ft (168 m)

Population (2020)
  - Total: 5,166
  - Density: 818.8/sq mi (316.13/km^{2})
- Time zone: UTC−6 (Central (CST))
  - Summer (DST): UTC−5 (CDT)
- ZIP Code: 74743
- Area code: 580
- FIPS code: 40-36300
- GNIS feature ID: 2410805
- Website: hugook.com

Hugo is a city in and the county seat of Choctaw County, Oklahoma, United States. It is located in southeastern Oklahoma, approximately 9 miles (14 km) north of the Texas state line. As of the 2020 census, the city population was 5,166.

The city was founded in 1901 and named for the French novelist Victor Hugo. In the postwar 20th century, the city served as winter quarters for some circus companies and performers. A cemetery has a section for circus personnel. Nearby is one of the oldest boarding schools west of the Mississippi: Goodland Academy, begun in 1848 as a Presbyterian mission, school and orphanage for Native American children.

The town is located in a cultural area of the state known as Little Dixie, as it was settled by Native American tribes, African Americans and European Americans from the southeastern United States. It is within the tourist area designated as Choctaw Country by the Oklahoma Department of Tourism.

== History ==
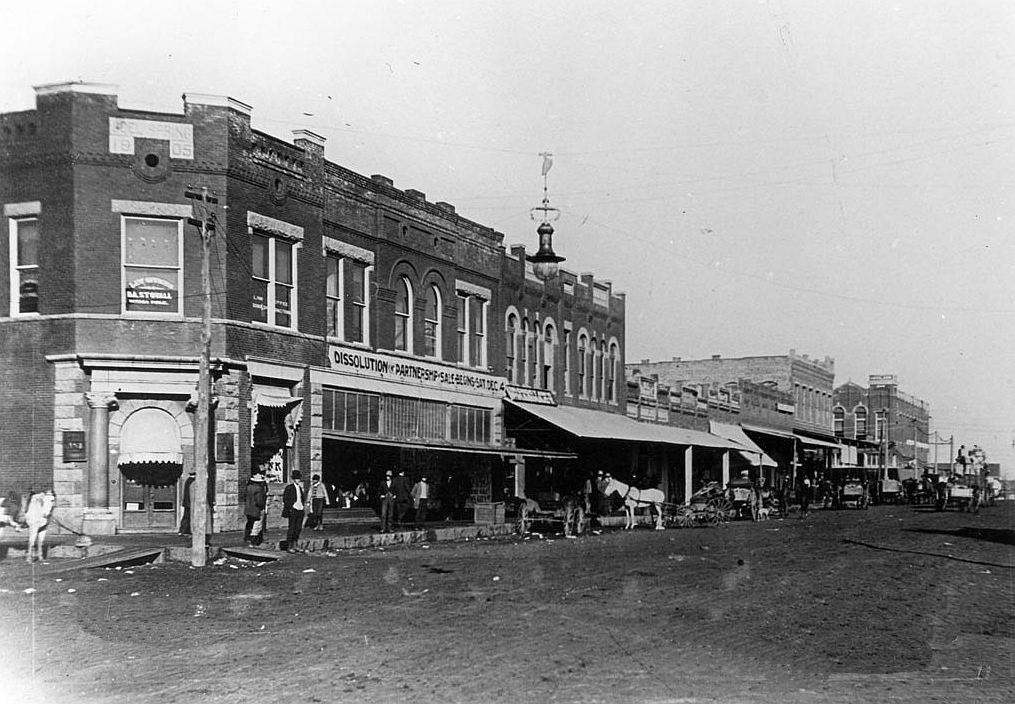
Broadway at Duke looking north, 1910

This was part of the Indian Territory to which the United States government relocated Native American tribes from east of the Mississippi River in the 1830s under its Indian Removal policy. Among the nations relocated here were the Choctaw, for whom the county is named. They were one of what were called the "Five Civilized Tribes" of the southeastern United States, as some of their people had adopted many elements of European-American culture. When they relocated, they brought with them the numerous enslaved African-Americans whom they held as workers and property.

As the majority of the Choctaw allied with the Confederate South during the American Civil War, the United States government insisted on a new peace treaty with them after its end. A condition was the Choctaws' emancipation of their slaves and granting to the freedmen of rights of full citizenship in the Choctaw nation, as the US was granting citizenship to former slaves of the South.

In 1902 the St. Louis, San Francisco and New Orleans Railroad (later the St. Louis–San Francisco Railway or "Frisco") built a line from Hope, Arkansas, to Ardmore, Oklahoma. It crossed the north–south line Frisco had built in 1887 to connect Monett, Missouri, to Paris, Texas. The territorial town that sprang up at the crossing would soon be named Hugo. The town's name was recommended by the wife of local surveyor W.H. Darrough, a fan of French writer Victor Hugo. At the time of its founding, Hugo was located in Kiamitia County, a part of the Pushmataha District of the Choctaw Nation.

As the end of the Indian Territory drew near, tribal citizens and other inhabitants organized an effort for the territory to be admitted to the Union as a state. The State of Sequoyah, which they proposed, divided the territories of the five tribes into counties. Hugo was designated as the county seat of Hitchcock County. Although neither Congress nor the president were interested in admitting Sequoyah as a state, the county boundaries proposed for Sequoyah were in some cases adopted for counties in the future state of Oklahoma.

In southeastern Oklahoma, the future Choctaw County's boundaries were generally those of Hitchcock County, Sequoyah. Similarly, boundaries proposed for Pushmataha County, Sequoyah served, in general, as the boundaries for Pushmataha County, Oklahoma. And McCurtain County, Oklahoma generally follows the boundaries proposed for McCurtain County, Sequoyah. Both counties are adjacent to and share boundaries with Choctaw County.

== Statehood and changes ==
When counties were reorganized to prepare Oklahoma for admission as a state, Hugo was designated as the county seat of the redefined Choctaw County, as it was already a population center in the area.

After allotments of communal tribal land to individual households of tribal members under the Dawes Act, the Choctaw Nation lost control of much of its land, which was purchased by European Americans.

== Circus City ==
Beginning in 1941, when the Al G. Kelly and Miller Brothers Circus relocated to Hugo from Kansas, there have been circuses based in this city. The Kelly and Miller Brothers were recruited by Vernon and Jewell Pratt, a local couple who owned a grocery store. In return the circus offered free Sunday performances for many years.

Hugo became a popular wintering place for circus and rodeo companies, because of its mild climate. Townspeople and circus people formed relationships and collaborated on civic projects. An estimated twenty circuses at times were based in Hugo, and in 2018 three still operate here: Carson and Barnes, Kelly Miller, and Culpepper & Merriweather. All are tent circuses that travel the region by road.

David Rawls (born 1948) grew up in a circus family, who performed with Famous Cole Circus. In addition to performing on trampoline with his brother, he later learned all aspects of the business. In 1984 he became owner/manager of his own show, Kelly Miller Circus. He sold it in 2009. During this period, he also had been selected as City Manager of Hugo for a time, and was elected and served as Mayor of the city at another time.

A portion of Mt. Olivet Cemetery was set aside as Showmen's Rest: buried here were circus owner D. R. Miller and rodeo cowboys Freckles Brown, Lane Frost, and Todd Whatley.

== Late 20th century to present ==
In late 1993, a number of violent incidents occurred. Before Christmas, a shootout took place in a Wal-Mart parking lot. Within one week in December, two fires occurred; the first was at the Booker T. Washington gymnasium on December 26. On December 28 a fire erupted in the central business district of Hugo, consuming five buildings and burning for four hours. The Belmont Hotel, which the area historical society was renovating, was destroyed. Area authorities suspected that the fires were arson.

=== Points of interest ===
In 1937, under the Works Progress Administration program for public art, artist Joseph Fleck painted an oil-on-canvas mural, titled The Red Man of Oklahoma Sees the First Stage Coach, in the United States post office in Hugo. This building is now used as the Oklahoma School System Administration Building. Murals were produced from 1934 to 1943 in the United States through the Section of Painting and Sculpture, later called the Section of Fine Arts, of the Treasury Department.

== Geography ==
Hugo is located at the center of Choctaw County. According to the United States Census Bureau, the city has a total area of 6.42 square miles (16.64 km^{2}), of which 6.40 square miles (16.58 km^{2}) is land and 0.02 square miles (0.06 km^{2}), or 0.36%, is water. Hugo Lake on the Kiamichi River lies northeast of town, and Roebuck Lake, an oxbow former channel of the Red River, lies south of town.

Hugo is the southern terminus of the Indian Nation Turnpike, a 105-mile (169 km) four-lane highway that runs northwest to Interstate 40 in Henryetta. It provides a vital transportation link from southeastern Oklahoma to the state's largest cities, Oklahoma City and Tulsa.

=== Climate ===
Climate data for Hugo, Oklahoma
Month	Jan	Feb	Mar	Apr	May	Jun	Jul	Aug	Sep	Oct	Nov	Dec	Year
Record high °F (°C)	81 (27)	86 (30)	92 (33)	94 (34)	98 (37)	105 (41)	110 (43)	110 (43)	108 (42)	100 (38)	88 (31)	84 (29)	110 (43)
Mean daily maximum °F (°C)	53.1 (11.7)	58.3 (14.6)	67.6 (19.8)	76 (24)	82.2 (27.9)	89.2 (31.8)	94.1 (34.5)	94.5 (34.7)	87.4 (30.8)	77.7 (25.4)	65.8 (18.8)	55.8 (13.2)	75.1 (23.9)
Mean daily minimum °F (°C)	30.6 (−0.8)	34.9 (1.6)	43.3 (6.3)	52.2 (11.2)	59.7 (15.4)	67.1 (19.5)	70.3 (21.3)	69.2 (20.7)	63 (17)	51.8 (11.0)	42.7 (5.9)	33.7 (0.9)	51.5 (10.8)
Record low °F (°C)	0 (−18)	−6 (−21)	7 (−14)	26 (−3)	36 (2)	50 (10)	54 (12)	53 (12)	38 (3)	22 (−6)	13 (−11)	−4 (−20)	−6 (−21)
Average precipitation inches (mm)	2.2 (56)	3.3 (84)	4.2 (110)	4.2 (110)	6.0 (150)	4.8 (120)	2.8 (71)	2.7 (69)	4.5 (110)	4.2 (110)	4.0 (100)	3.3 (84)	46.1 (1,170)
Average snowfall inches (cm)	1.3 (3.3)	1.2 (3.0)	0.4 (1.0)	0 (0)	0 (0)	0 (0)	0 (0)	0 (0)	0 (0)	0 (0)	0.1 (0.25)	0.7 (1.8)	3.4 (8.6)
Average rainy days	6	6	8	8	8	7	5	5	6	6	6	7	83
Source 1: weather.com
Source 2: Weatherbase.com noaa.gov

== Demographics ==
Historical population
Census	Pop.	Note	%±
1910	4,582		—
1920	6,368		39.0%
1930	5,272		−17.2%
1940	5,909		12.1%
1950	5,984		1.3%
1960	6,287		5.1%
1970	6,585		4.7%
1980	7,172		8.9%
1990	5,978		−16.6%
2000	5,536		−7.4%
2010	5,310		−4.1%
2020	5,166		−2.7%
U.S. Decennial Census

=== 2020 census ===
As of the 2020 census, Hugo had a population of 5,166. The median age was 38.3 years.

26.0% of residents were under the age of 18 and 19.7% of residents were 65 years of age or older. For every 100 females there were 87.5 males, and for every 100 females age 18 and over there were 81.9 males age 18 and over.

96.5% of residents lived in urban areas, while 3.5% lived in rural areas.

There were 2,201 households in Hugo, of which 31.3% had children under the age of 18 living in them. Of all households, 28.8% were married-couple households, 22.8% were households with a male householder and no spouse or partner present, and 41.6% were households with a female householder and no spouse or partner present. About 39.4% of all households were made up of individuals and 18.0% had someone living alone who was 65 years of age or older.

There were 2,572 housing units, of which 14.4% were vacant. Among occupied housing units, 42.7% were owner-occupied and 57.3% were renter-occupied. The homeowner vacancy rate was 2.6% and the rental vacancy rate was 11.2%.

Racial composition as of the 2020 census
Race	Percent
White	47.1%
Black or African American	20.5%
American Indian and Alaska Native	15.4%
Asian	0.3%
Native Hawaiian and Other Pacific Islander	0.1%
Some other race	1.7%
Two or more races	15.1%
Hispanic or Latino (of any race)	5.8%

=== 2000 census ===
As of the 2000 census, there were 5,536 people, 2,309 households, and 1,415 families residing in the city. The population density was 999.0 inhabitants per square mile (385.7/km^{2}). There were 2,798 housing units at an average density of 504.9 per square mile (194.9/km^{2}).

There were 2,309 households, out of which 29.4% had children under the age of 18 living with them, 37.4% were married couples living together, 20.7% had a female householder with no husband present, and 38.7% were non-families. Of all households 35.3% were made up of individuals, and 19.7% had someone living alone who was 65 years of age or older. The average household size was 2.30 and the average family size was 2.98.

In the city, the population was spread out, with 26.6% under the age of 18, 8.7% from 18 to 24, 23.6% from 25 to 44, 20.8% from 45 to 64, and 20.3% who were 65 years of age or older. The median age was 38 years. For every 100 females, there were 79.9 males. For every 100 females age 18 and over, there were 73.0 males.

The median income for a household in the city was $19,321, and the median income for a family was $26,523. Males had a median income of $26,473 versus $17,348 for females. The per capita income for the city was $11,676. About 25.5% of families and 29.4% of the population were below the poverty line, including 43.5% of those under age 18 and 22.1% of those age 65 or over.

== Economy ==
Agriculture (especially cotton farming), timber, and ranching have been mainstays of the city's economy since its beginning. With industrial scale agriculture, mechanization replaced numerous farm jobs.

Since the 1940s, circuses have used Hugo as their winter quarters and some regional circuses have been based here. Their owners and performers have often gotten involved in civic life.

The changing economy and culture of the later 20th century resulted in the 1970s opening of the Kiamichi Technology Center and the "Agriplex," originally the Choctaw County Agricultural Center.

== Government ==
Hugo implemented a council-manager form of city government in 1995. Council members are elected from single-member districts, and hire a professional manager to oversee operations of the city.

== Transportation ==
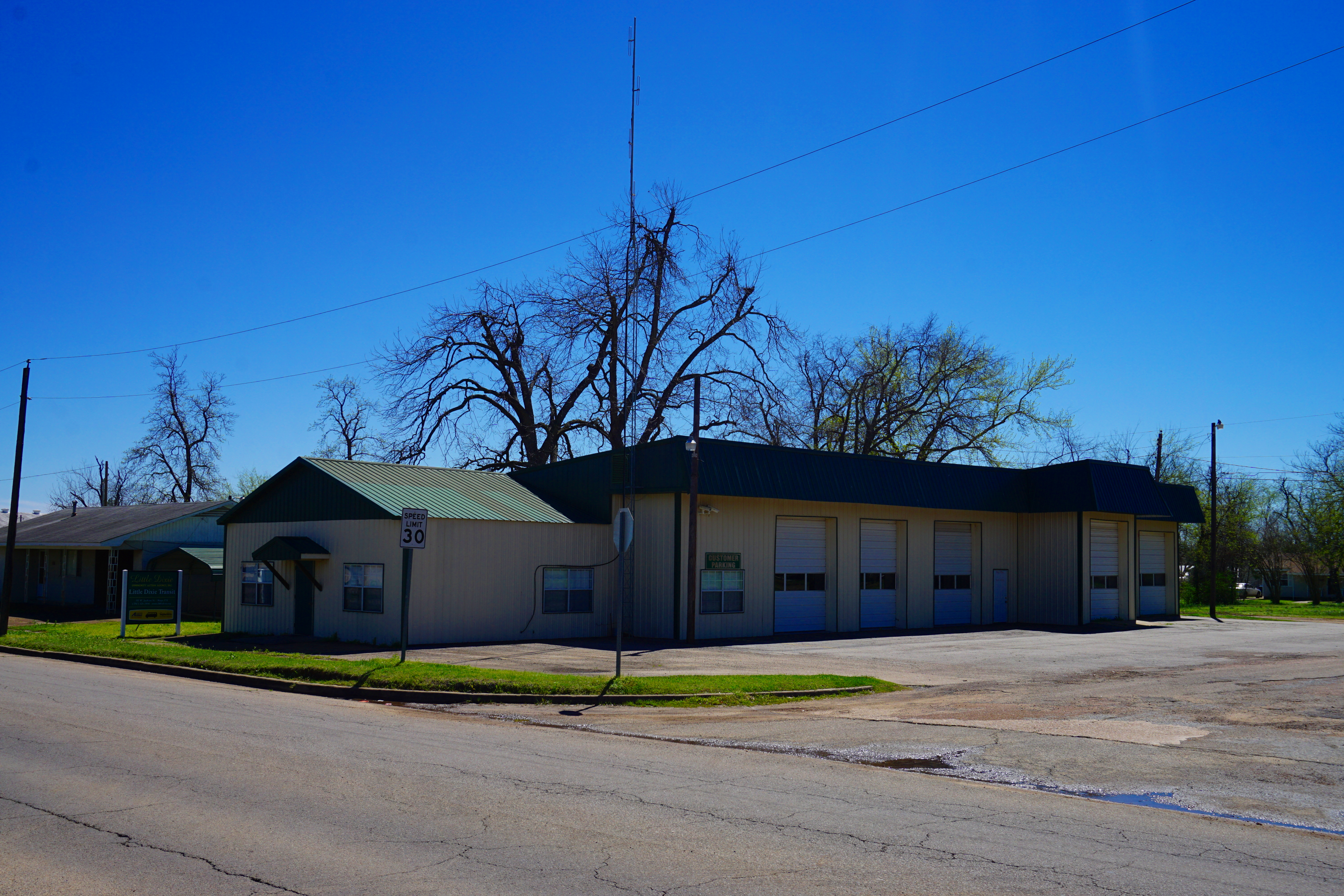
Little Dixie Transit in Hugo

Hugo serves as the southern terminus of the Indian Nation Turnpike. U.S. Highway 70 runs west to east through the city and connects Hugo to Durant 53 miles (85 km) to the west and Idabel 43 miles (69 km) to the east. U.S. Highway 271 runs south out of the city and leads 26 miles (42 km) to Paris, Texas.

Hugo is served by the city-operated Stan Stamper Municipal Airport, with one 4,007-by-75-foot (1,221 m × 23 m) runway. The airport has ten aircraft based on the field. It supports medical air ambulance operations by EagleMed, as well as scheduled cargo operations for all of southeastern Oklahoma, via a flight from Tulsa operated by Martinaire on behalf of UPS.

== National Register of Historic Places ==
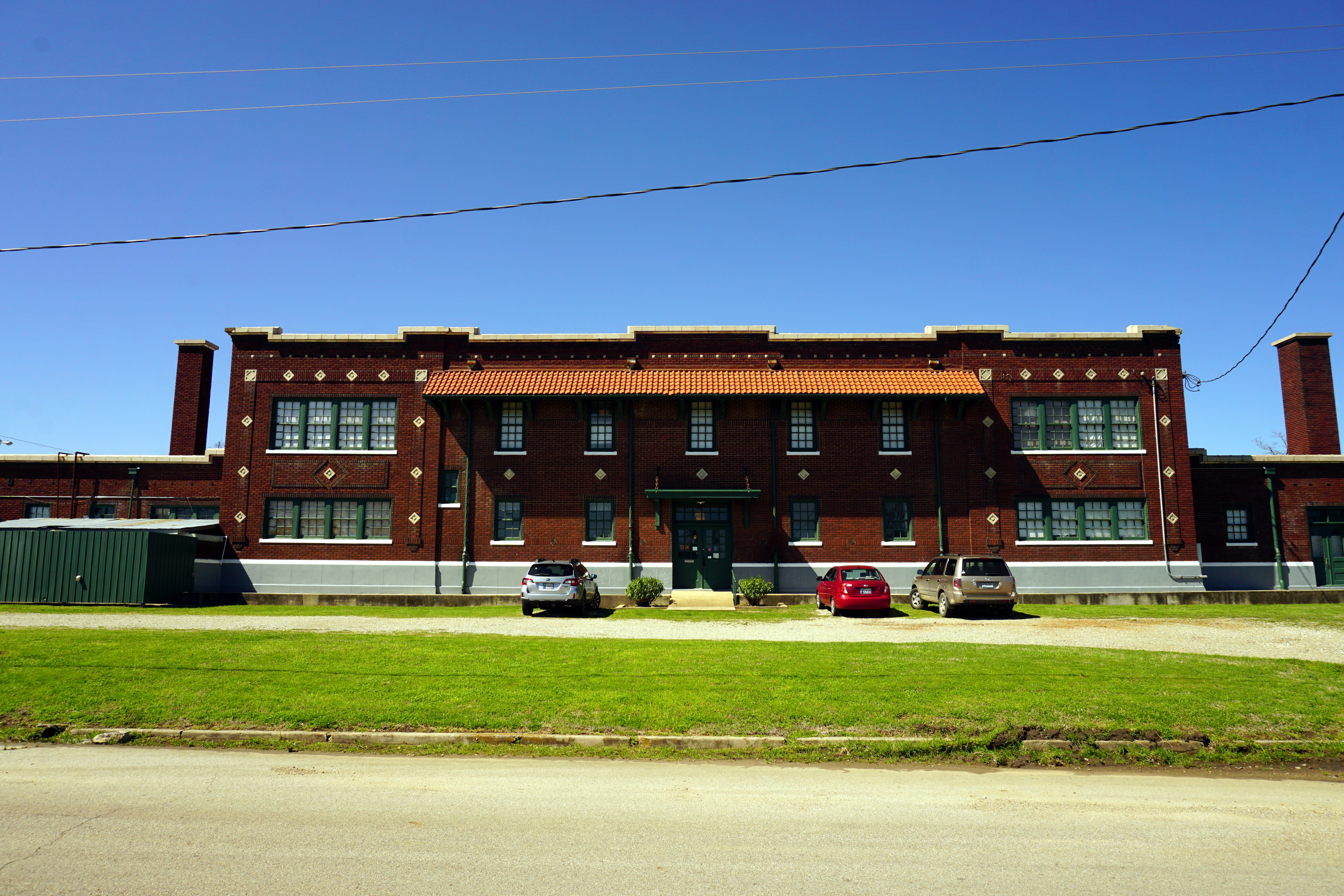
Frisco Depot Museum

- Frisco Depot Museum and Harvey House Restaurant (NR 80003259). The depot, which was built in 1914 and served into the 1960s, houses an eclectic mix of items including a model railway, a miniature circus, and an old Southwestern Bell telephone switching center, as well as railroad and other local memorabilia. A former Harvey House lunchroom has been restored, and Harvey Girl quarters are preserved on the second floor, consisting of three bedrooms and a bath together with a matron's suite. The Frisco Depot RV Park is adjacent to the depot.
- Hugo Historic District (NR 80003260). The Hugo Historic District is a 12 block area consisting of some 64 structures, a majority of which were built between 1900 and 1920. It includes not only the railway depot, but also three hotels and various retail buildings, thus preserving the appearance of an early 20th century railroad town.
- Hugo National Guard Armory (NR 88001378)
- Hugo Public Library (NR 88001379)
- Speer School (NR 88001380)
- Rose Hill Plantation (NR 10000069)
- Everidge Cabin and Cemetery (NR 82003674)

== Notable people ==
- Henry G. Bennett, longest-serving president of Oklahoma State University.
- Buckskin Bill Black (1929–2018), Long-time children's television host in Baton Rouge, Louisiana, grew up in Hugo.
- Lane Clyde Frost (October 12, 1963 – July 30, 1989), world champion bull rider
- William Judson Holloway, former governor of Oklahoma
- William Judson Holloway, Jr., Judge of the United States Court of Appeals for the Tenth Circuit
- James Ling, entrepreneur and founder of Ling-Temco-Vought
- Bill Moyers, liberal journalist and former White House Press Secretary from 1965 to 1967 (during the Lyndon B. Johnson administration); political commentator and cable news figure
- Mike Rabon, vocalist and lead guitarist for The Five Americans with hits "I See The Light", "Western Union", "Zip Code"" etc.
- Patrick W. O'Reilly, lawyer and politician
- Clancy Smith, was born and raised in Hugo. After graduating from Oklahoma University School of Law, she taught English. Later she earned a law degree from University of Tulsa College of Law and was appointed to the Oklahoma Court of Criminal Appeals. She retired in 2017.
- B. J. Thomas (1942–2021), singer known for the #1 hits "Raindrops Keep Fallin' on My Head" (featured in the 1969 film Butch Cassidy and the Sundance Kid) and "(Hey Won't You Play) Another Somebody Done Somebody Wrong Song"
- Wallace Willis, African-American musician and songwriter, born into slavery in Mississippi, was living near present-day Hugo when he wrote "Swing Low, Sweet Chariot" in 1840. Then known as Wallace, he had been brought to Indian Territory during Indian Removal by his master, wealthy Choctaw farmer Britt Willis.
