= Russian profanity =

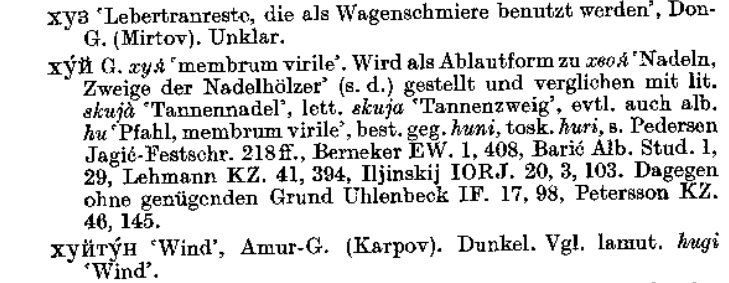
The mat-word хуй (khuy) in Max Vasmer's Russisches etymologisches Wörterbuch ('Etymological Dictionary of the Russian Language'). Heidelberg, 1950–1958

Mat, matershchina, mat language (Russian: мат; матерщи́на / ма́терный язы́к, romanized: matershchina / materny yazyk) are the Russian terms for highly vulgar, obscene, or profane language in Russian and some other Slavic language communities. A person who uses mat profusely is called matershchinnik (матерщинник).

== Basic lexical units ==
Mat is usually defined in terms of its lexical composition. The scholar of mat Yu. I. Levin defines mat ("obscene expressions") as "relatively complete" segments of speech containing at least one obscene root. According to Levin, the roots can be enumerated, with the core consisting of "three universally known mat roots", but the boundaries of the list are blurred. Precise criteria for inclusion cannot be formulated, because in the end mat is whatever native speakers judge to be mat, and some disagreement is unavoidable: the word gondon (гондон, rude for "condom"), for instance, is felt by some speakers to be mat and by others not.

A typical list of mat roots contains four to seven items. Russian mat words are Slavic in origin, entered the language from colloquial speech, dialects and jargon, and relate to the sexual sphere of life.

=== The obscene triad ===
The base of Russian mat vocabulary is the "obscene triad", found in many languages: the male sexual organ (хуй, khuy), the female sexual organ (пизда, pizda) and the verb describing copulation (ебать, yebat). A characteristic feature of modern Russian is that the words of the triad have no neutral literary synonyms: the nearest equivalents are purely medical terms, often of Latin etymology.

=== Other mat roots ===
Aleksey Plutser-Sarno lists 35 roots that respondents in surveys considered mat (the list includes the rude words for "to gobble" (жрать, zhrat) and "to vomit" (блевать, blevat); respondents, he adds, treated "certain other" roots as mat as well), and notes that seven lexemes are most often considered mat: besides the triad, these are blyad (блядь, "fallen woman"), mude (du.)/mudy (pl.) (муде/муды, "testicles"), manda (манда, female genitals) and yelda (елда, male genitals). It is these seven words that Plutser-Sarno proposes to adopt, as a working assumption, as the basis of the "conventional concept" of mat.

Plutser-Sarno observes that blyad stands apart among the mat lexemes: it is the only word at the top of the list that denotes neither the genitals nor copulation. In surveys it ranks second among mat lexemes (after yebat), and its root is therefore included, alongside the triad, in the "expressive core" of mat, which on Plutser-Sarno's account thus consists of four roots.

=== Etymology of mat vocabulary ===
- Khuy (хуй) — from Slavic *xujь "thorn, needle", from Proto-Indo-European *skeu-; the same root yields Russian хвоя (khvoya, "conifer needles"); compare Latvian: skuja "fir needle" and Lithuanian: skuja "fir needle, cone".
- Pizda (пизда) — from Proto-Indo-European *pisd-eH₂- "vulva"; compare Lithuanian: piza with the same meaning.
- Yebat (ебать) — from Proto-Indo-European *iebh- (glossed "to copulate" by Gamkrelidze and Ivanov, or "to enter, to intrude" (German: eingehen, eindringen) in the dictionary edited by Helmut Rix, which cites the retention of the sense "to enter" in the Tocharian languages). The same root gives Old High German eiba, Ancient Greek οιφέω (oiphéō) and Sanskrit yábhati.
- Blyad (блядь) — from Slavic блѫдъ, whence Russian блуд (blud, "delusion, error, sin"); the forms originally showed an alternation of the yuses, ѫ/ѧ. Compare Old East Slavic блясти < блѧсти "to err, to be mistaken"; Old Church Slavonic блѧдити, with the same meaning; Church Slavonic блядословить "to lie, deceive, slander"; and Polish: błąd "mistake". The Proto-Slavic root *blǫd-/*blęd- "to stray, to be confused", from Proto-Indo-European *bhlond-/*bhlend- "to shimmer dimly", has cognates in the Germanic languages: English blend "to mix" and blond "fair-haired".

In the nineteenth century a theory was put forward that mat had been borrowed from Mongolian; it was met with criticism even at the time of its appearance. The theory has now been conclusively refuted by the birch bark letters with mat texts discovered in the second half of the twentieth century. The misconception nevertheless remains widespread: when Timur Kibirov's poem "Epistle to L. Rubinstein", which included several mat words, was first published in the newspaper Atmoda in 1989, one journalist derisively called it "an epistle from a Tatar to a Jew".

== Word formation ==
Russian mat is characterised by a "truly incalculable" number of derived words (due to the highly inflected character of the Russian language), which are continuously generated by the street speech. V. V. Raskin gives the following incomplete list of verbs formed from ебать (yebat):

ебануть, ебануться, ебаться, ебиздить, ёбнуть, ёбнуться, ебстись, въебать, выебать, выёбываться, доебать, доебаться, доёбывать, заебать, заебаться, наебать, наебаться, наебнуть, наебнуться, объебать, объебаться, остоебенить, остоебеть, отъебать, отъебаться, переебать, переебаться, поебать, поебаться, подъебать, подъебаться, подъебнуть, разъебать, разъебаться, съебать, съебаться, уебать.

On the basis of this list, Valery Mokienko concludes that "the entire word-formation paradigm of the Russian verbal lexicon" is brought into play, and notes equally extensive possibilities for deriving other parts of speech: долбоёб, ёбарь, ебатура, ебальник, заёб, мудоёб, поебон, ебливый, приёбливый, поёбанный, and so on.

The scale of word formation provides an additional criterion for delimiting the "core" of mat vocabulary: the first five to seven words in the 35-word list of mat words compiled from surveys generate several thousand derivatives, while the remainder generate only a few hundred in total.

The first volume of the Great Dictionary of Mat by the Russian lexicographer Plutser-Sarno is dedicated to expressions derived from the word khuy, numbering over 500 entries. The second volume is for expressions derived from the word pizda, numbering over 500 entries.

== History and use ==
Some texts in birch bark manuscripts of 12th-13th centuries are interpreted as using mat.

=== Modern usage ===
The contemporaneous use of mat is widespread, especially in the army, police, blue-collar workers, the criminal world, and many other all-male milieus, with particular fervor in the male-dominated military and the structurally similar social strata.

A typical use of mat is verbal aggression directed at a specific addressee whom the swearer wants to berate or insult. Mat is, however, often used by people with bad control of language for more neutral purposes as well; the mat vocabulary is then desemanticised, that is, the speaker has no intention of insulting anyone, and swears:

- in an attempt to make speech more emotional;
- to release the speaker's psychological tension;
- as fillers and interjections.

The tabooed status of mat often leads to the omission of words with mat roots from utterances (aposiopesis): хоть до… ("even up to the..."), ты же такой… ("you're such a..."). Euphemisms are also frequent, but Plutser-Sarno points out that, because the tabooing of mat is relatively weak and the word-formation potential of mat roots is so high, the euphemism of a mat word may be perceived simply as a more elaborate and emotional variant of the original expression.

Yu. I. Levin distinguishes the following areas of practical use of mat:

- swearing proper:
  - utterances with a purpose:
    - dismissals (пошёл на/в…, "go to...") express the speaker's dissociation from the addressee, who may be the interlocutor or, more rarely, a third party. Dismissals aimed at third parties, as well as those of the type а ну на хуй, are weaker in expressive force and blend into expressions of indifference;
    - refusals (хуюшки, хуй тебе) express categorical refusal combined with an insult to the person asking, and have no decent equivalents apart from euphemistic ones;
    - expressions of indifference (хуй с тобой) express dissociation; depending on the context they may convey either indifference or reluctant assent;
    - oaths (блядью буду, "may I be a blyad [if...]") express the second half of the construction "if what I promise does not come to pass (or what I describe did not happen), then consider me a bad person";
  - utterances without a purpose:
    - pejoratives (мудак) are terms of abuse with no pragmatic aim beyond the insult itself, which may be directed at the interlocutor, at the speaker himself, at a third party or at an inanimate object; in the last case the usage approaches that of the pronouns (see below);
    - interjections (бля) serve for the direct expression of emotion: surprise, indignation, admiration, displeasure;
    - insertions: the same turns of phrase that are used as interjections may also be used as empty parenthetical fillers (in Levin's view, either to make speech reliably obscene or to embellish it poetically). There is no sharp boundary between interjections and insertions: compare Во, бля, погодка! ("Some weather, blya!" — a positive or negative emotion) and А он, бля, говорит… ("And he, blya, says..." — a neutral insertion carrying no meaning);
- expressive substitutes for non-tabooed expressions:
  - pronouns: хуй, for instance, serves as a pronoun replacing practically any animate masculine noun (the same role for inanimates is played by хуёвина). The emotional colouring in this case is neutral or mildly negative;
  - pro-verbs: many verbal derivatives of the triad (like пиздячить) denote an unspecific action; the roots carry no semantics of their own, the meaning being determined by prefixes, suffixes and context. The view that mat nouns and verbs are in fact pronouns and pro-verbs goes back as far as I. A. Baudouin de Courtenay;
  - substitutes for ordinary words with negative semantics (ни хуя instead of ничего, "nothing"; хуёвый instead of плохой, "bad").

It is easy to picture to oneself the world described by [negative mat] vocabulary … a world in which people steal and deceive, beat and fear, in which "everything has been plundered, betrayed, sold", in which people fall but do not get up, take but do not give, in which they either work themselves to exhaustion or botch the work — but in any case treat work, like everything and everyone around them, with disgust or with profound indifference — and it all ends up as полный пиздец [total pizdets].

— Yu. I. Levin

=== Etymology of the word "mat" ===
On the generally accepted account, the Old Russian word mat derives from мать ("mother") as a contraction of expressions such as матерная брань (maternaya bran, "maternal abuse"), материться (materitsya, "to swear obscenely") and посылать к матери (posylat k materi, "to send someone 'to the mother'"). An alternative theory derives "mat" from the original meaning of the word mat — "voice" — that survived into the present day in phrases such as кричать благим матом (krichat blagim matom, "to scream at the top of one's lungs") and in Belarusian, a language related to Russian. Berneker and Vasmer rejected this theory (cf. the expression скакать лихим матом, skakat likhim matom, "to gallop at full tilt").

== Legal issues ==
=== Censorship ===
In 2013, Roskomnadzor deemed the four expressive core roots "absolutely unacceptable in the mass media": "Obscene designation of the male genital organ, obscene designation of the female genital organ, obscene designation of the process of copulation and obscene designation of a woman of dissolute behavior, as well as all linguistic units derived from these words".

Mat words were included by Polish linguist Jan Baudouin de Courtenay in the 3rd and 4th editions of the Explanatory Dictionary of the Living Great Russian Language, which was printed four times in 1903–1909 (twice) and in 1911–1912, 1912–1914. The inclusion of rude and abusive words became an obstacle to the reprinting of this version of the dictionary in the Soviet Union for censorship reasons.

=== Hooliganism ===
In the Soviet Union obscenity was censored in print and in the media, and could be prosecuted as petty hooliganism when used in public places. With the collapse of the Soviet Union censorship of mat stopped, and a number of writers, singers, and actors started using taboo-shattering mat in their works. For example, the singer Sergey "Shnur" Shnurov is notorious of using mat in his songs.

In modern Russia, since the times of the Soviet Union, the use of obscenities in public aggravates a disorderly conduct charge and may lead to its qualification as petty hooliganism, punishable under article 20.1.1 of the Offences Code of Russia, although there was no clear legal definition of what exactly constitutes an obscenity.

== Notable incidents ==
- 2003: "Khuy voyne!" (literally "Dick to the war!"), a pacifist phrase attributed to the Russian girl pop duo t.A.T.u.
- 2014: "Putin khuylo!", abbreviated as "ПТН X̆ЛО" (PTN KhLO).
- 2015: Debils, blyad abbreviated as "ДБЛ БЛД" (DBL BLD): In August 2015, Russian Foreign Minister Sergey Lavrov swore in low voice, but audibly, during a press conference with Saudi Arabian Foreign Minister Adel al-Jubeir while the interpreter was translating his words. It is unknown who or what the swear was targeting. Lavrov's only commentary was that he didn't lose his temper and that he is not the only whose utterance was unintentionally caught by a microphone that was not turned off. The phrase became a Russian internet meme and a cliche in reference to stupid acts or utterances.
- 2022: "Russian warship, go fuck yourself", Russian: Русский военный корабль, иди нахуй, romanized: Russky voyenny korabl, idi nakhuy, pronounced [ˈrusːkʲɪj vɐˈjenːɨj kɐˈrablʲ ɪˈdʲi ˈnaxʊj];

== See also ==
- Fenya
- Russian jokes § Taboo vocabulary
- Seven dirty words
- Leningrad, a Russian ska/punk band famous for its vulgar lyrics
- Sektor Gaza, a Russian metaironic horror hard-rock band famous for its vulgar lyrics
- Polish profanity

== Sources ==
- Chernyavskaya, T. N.; Miloslavskaya, K. S.; Rostova, E. G.; Frolova, O. E.; Borisenko, V. I.; Vyunov, Yu. A.; Chudnov, V. P. (2007). Мат [Mat]. Россия. Большой лингвострановедческий словарь [Russia: The Great Linguocultural Dictionary] (in Russian). Moscow: Pushkin State Russian Language Institute; AST-Press.
- Dreizin, Felix; Priestly, Tom (1982). "A Systematic Approach to Russian Obscene Language". Russian Linguistics. 6: 233–249.
- Gamkrelidze, Tamaz V.; Ivanov, Vyacheslav V. (1984). Индоевропейский язык и индоевропейцы [Indo-European and the Indo-Europeans] (in Russian). Vol. 2. Tbilisi: Tbilisi University Press.
- Levin, Yuri I. (1997). Об обсценных выражениях русского языка [On the obscene expressions of the Russian language]. Анти-мир русской культуры [The Anti-World of Russian Culture] (in Russian). Moscow: Ladomir. pp. 108–120.
- Levin, Yuri I. (1998). Об обсценных выражениях русского языка [On the obscene expressions of the Russian language]. Избранные труды. Поэтика. Семиотика [Selected Works: Poetics. Semiotics] (in Russian). Moscow. pp. 809–819. Archived from the original on 29 November 2014.
- Mokienko, Valery M. (1994). Русская бранная лексика: цензурное и нецензурное [Russian abusive vocabulary: the censored and the unprintable]. Rusistika (in Russian) (1–2). Berlin. Archived from the original on 19 March 2015.
- Plutser-Sarno, Alexei Yu. (2005). О семантике слова «мат» [On the semantics of the word "mat"]. Большой словарь мата [The Big Dictionary of Mat] (in Russian). Vol. 1. Saint Petersburg: Limbus Press.
- Rix, Helmut, ed. (2001). Lexikon der indogermanischen Verben [Lexicon of Indo-European Verbs] (in German). Wiesbaden: Reichert.
- Shansky, Nikolai M.; Bobrova, Tatyana A. (2004). "Мат (3)". Школьный этимологический словарь русского языка. Происхождение слов [School Etymological Dictionary of the Russian Language: The Origin of Words] (in Russian). Moscow. Archived from the original on 29 November 2014.
- Uspensky, Boris A. (1996). Мифологический аспект русской экспрессивной фразеологии [The mythological aspect of Russian expressive phraseology]. Анти-мир русской культуры [The Anti-World of Russian Culture] (in Russian). Moscow: Ladomir. pp. 9–107.
- Vinogradov, Viktor V. (2010). Благим матом. История слов [A History of Words] (in Russian).
- Zorin, Andrei (1996). Легализация обсценной лексики и её культурные последствия [The legalisation of obscene vocabulary and its cultural consequences]. Анти-мир русской культуры [The Anti-World of Russian Culture] (in Russian). Moscow: Ladomir. pp. 134–135.
