= Polish profanity =

Swearing in the Polish language

The Polish language, like many others, includes swear words and profanity. While some terms are not always regarded as pejorative, others are considered highly offensive. There is scholarly debate regarding which words in Polish are the most derogatory.

Different types of swearing identified by Steven Pinker are present in Polish. These include abusive, cathartic, dysphemistic, emphatic and idiomatic forms.

Studies suggest that perceptions of profanity in Poland vary depending on context, such as swearing in public versus in private. In one survey, 65% of adults reported swearing due to emotional reasons, while 21% stated they never swore.

The CBOS (Centrum Badania Opinii Społecznej; Centre for Public Opinion Research) has conducted surveys on the use of profanity. Its reports note that self-reported data on swearing in private settings may not always be reliable, as respondents could underreport or alter their behaviour, potentially limiting the accuracy of findings.

== Vulgar words ==
Linguist Jerzy Bralczyk has stated that there are five basic vulgarisms in Polish: chuj ("cock"), pizda ("cunt"), pierdolić and jebać ("fuck"), and kurwa ("whore"). Other vulgarisms are typically combinations of these, as well as derived forms and phraseological expressions. New vulgarisms emerge when new word configurations are created or when their semantic context shifts.

The Dictionary of Real Polish lists four vulgar words used in 350 different configurations, including gówno ("shit"), which appears in 47 distinct functions.

=== Vagina ===
Term	Pronunciation (IPA)	Meanings
Cipa	[ˈt͡ɕipa]	1. Literally "pussy". A diminutive form is cipka, which is usually not considered as crude.; 2. An insult directed towards a female.; 3. A person regarded as incompetent.
Pizda	[ˈpizda]	1. Similar to cipa, but more vulgar; comparable to the English "cunt". Also used in Russian mat.; 2. A black eye.; 3. A coward.

=== Penis ===
Term	Pronunciation (IPA)	Meanings
Chuj (Note: Sometimes incorrectly written as huj. Same as in Russian mat.)	[xuj]	1. "Dick" or "cock". The diminutive form is chujek.; 2. An insult for a rude person, usually male.; 3. A disliked male.
Chujowy (Note: Sometimes incorrectly written as hujowy.)	[xujɔvɨ]	1. An adjective derived from chuj, literally meaning "dick-like". Masculine form: chujowy; feminine: chujowa; neuter: chujowe.; 2. Often used to describe an object or situation of poor or undesirable quality. Example: Chujowy samochód ("A vehicle that broadly fails in its utility to be of use, breaks down often, looks bad, etc.").
Chujowo (Note: Sometimes incorrectly written as hujowo.)	[xujɔvɔ]	1. An adverb derived from chuj.; 2. Used to describe a bad state of being.; 3. Used to describe a poor way of doing something.

=== To copulate ===
Term	Pronunciation (IPA)	Meanings
Pierdolić się	[ˈpʲɛrdɔlʲit͡ɕ ˈɕɛ]	1. To have sex.; 2. To waste time on something.; 3. To be overly cautious with something.
Jebać	[ˈjɛbat͡ɕ]	1. Literally "to fuck" or "to have sex with".; 2. Considered one of the most versatile vulgar words in Polish, with many derivatives and figurative meanings.; Odjebać – To mess up (Co ty odjebałeś!? → "What did you do?!"); Rozjebać – To break/destroy (Rozjebałem samochód na drzewie → "I wrecked the car by driving it into a tree"); Przejebać – To screw up / be in trouble (On ma przejebane → "He's in deep trouble"); Wyjebać – To throw away (Wyjebałem telewizor przez okno → "I threw the TV out of the window"); Najebać – To beat someone / get drunk (Chłopaki się najebali jak żule pod Biedronką → "The guys got drunk like bums in front of Biedronka"); Zajebać – To kill / to steal (Gościu zajebał mi gorzałę! Zaraz go zajebię! → "The guy stole my vodka! I'm going to kill him!"); Ujebać – To get dirty (Ujebałeś się jak świnia! → "You got yourself dirty like a pig!"); Przyjebać – To hit (Wkurwił mnie, to mu przyjebałem. → "He pissed me off, so I hit him.")
Pieprzyć	[ˈpʲɛpʂɨt͡ɕ]	1. To have sex, "to fuck".; 2. To lie or talk nonsense.; 3. To disregard something or someone as unimportant.; 4. To waste time on something.; 5. In a non-vulgar sense, "to add pepper".
Pierdolić	[ˈpʲɛrdɔlit͡ɕ]	1. To have sex, "to fuck".; 2. To regard something as irrelevant or not worth attention.; 3. To lie or talk nonsense.
Wyruchać	[ˈvɨruxat͡ɕ]	1. To have sex with someone, "to fuck". A variation of ruchać, often used in the past or future tense.; 2. To deceive someone.; 3. To steal from someone.
Rżnąć	[ˈrʐnɔɲt͡ɕ]	1. To have sex, "to fuck".; 2. Has additional non-vulgar meanings, e.g. "to saw".
Wypierdalać	[ˈvɨpʲɛrdalat͡ɕ]	1. To kick someone out.; 2. To leave or get away from somewhere.; 3. To throw something away.

=== Anti-LGBT slurs ===
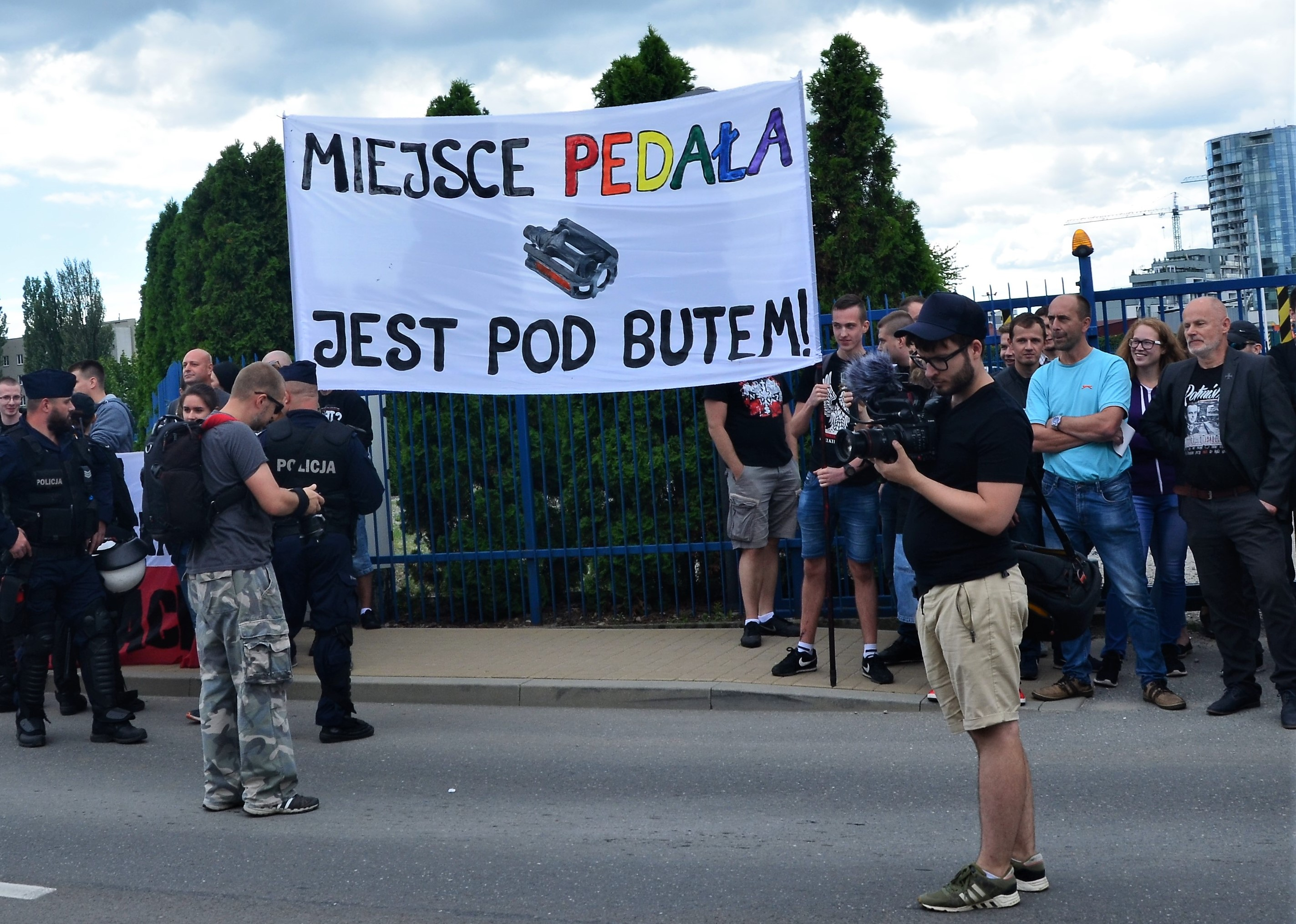
Anti-LGBT protesters holding a banner that translates as "a fag's place is under the boot".

Term	Pronunciation (IPA)	Meaning	Notes
Pedał	[ˈpɛdaw]	A derogatory term equivalent to "faggot", referring to a gay man.	The literal meaning of the word is "pedal". "Pedaling forbidden" anti-gay symbol

=== Other ===
Term	Pronunciation (IPA)	Meanings	Notes
Dupa	[ˈdupa]	1. Buttocks, "ass".; 2. A scaredy cat.; 3. An insult directed at a man.; 4. A vulgar way to refer to an attractive woman.; 5. Can refer to a girlfriend (preferably when discussed in her absence, unless derogatorily described as a ździra).	
Gówno	[ˈɡuvnɔ]	1. Feces, literally "shit".; 2. An insult towards a person considered unworthy of attention.; 3. Something useless or worthless.; 4. Can also mean "nothing", similar to English expressions "jack shit" or "fuck all".	
Jasna cholera	[ˈjasna ˈxɔlɛra]	1. An expression of frustration, similar to "holy shit" in English.	
Kurwa	[ˈkurva]	1. A female prostitute.; 2. An immoral or unethical person.; 3. An expression of frustration, similar to "fuck!" in English.; 4. Used as a filler, like "fucking" in English, e.g. "I hate this fucking show".	

== Context and function ==
Numerous studies have examined the use of profanity in everyday life, as well as in online interactions. There is no consensus on whether vulgar language is more common online, and the topic is considered difficult to study because usage can change over time.

One study analysed interactions on different internet platforms: an open discussion forum, a closed discussion forum, and a social networking site. The open forum allowed for the most anonymity, while the other two required some form of user identification. The study found that users often employed vulgar expressions to criticize arguments, attack other users directly, or insult larger groups. In other cases, profanity was used to express general frustration.

Profanity began appearing in Polish songs around the late 1970s and into the 1980s. This was largely a response to the political and social climate of the time, with youth using vulgar expressions to convey frustration. While some songs containing profanities were presented in mass media, works with vulgar language more often circulated within local communities.

This censorship contributed to innovative methods of expressing emotion and frustration, which influenced the development of Polish rock in the 1980s. Profanity in Polish music has been subject to less strict censorship in recent years.

== Lexical borrowing ==
Several words in the Polish lexicon have been borrowed from foreign languages and are used with meanings similar to their original context. Some of these borrowed words are profane or vulgar.

For example, the English abbreviation MILF retains the same meaning in Polish as in its original context. Similarly, the abbreviation WTF ("what the fuck") is sometimes used in Polish profanity.

The noun swołocz is borrowed from the Russian word сволочь. Some profanities have been adopted from German and transcribed phonetically to reflect Polish pronunciation. For instance, szajs is derived from the German Scheiße and carries the same meaning as the Polish word.

== See also ==
- Mat (profanity)
- Seven dirty words
