= Qaleh Qazi Rural District =

Rural district in Hormozgan province, Iran

Qaleh Qazi Rural District Persian: دهستان قلعه قاضي
- Rural District
- Location within Iran
- Coordinates: 27°22′58″N 56°37′06″E
- Country: Iran
- Province: Hormozgan
- County: Bandar Abbas
- District: Qaleh Qazi
- Capital: Qaleh Qazi

Population (2016)
  - Total: 5,529
- Time zone: UTC+3:30 (IRST)

Qaleh Qazi Rural District (Persian: دهستان قلعه قاضي) is in Qaleh Qazi District of Bandar Abbas County, Hormozgan province, Iran. It is administered from the city of Qaleh Qazi.

== Demographics ==
=== Population ===
At the time of the 2006 National Census, the rural district's population was 12,011 in 2,566 households. There were 4,694 inhabitants in 1,275 households at the following census of 2011. The 2016 census measured the population of the rural district as 5,529 in 1,578 households. The most populous of its 18 villages was Chah Faleh-ye Gharbi, with 712 people.
