= Qaleh Qazi District =

District in Hormozgan province, Iran

Qaleh Qazi District Persian: بخش قلعه قاضی
- District
- Location within Iran
- Coordinates: 27°20′36″N 56°37′12″E
- Country: Iran
- Province: Hormozgan
- County: Bandar Abbas
- Capital: Qaleh Qazi

Population (2016)
  - Total: 16,049
- Time zone: UTC+3:30 (IRST)

Qaleh Qazi District (Persian: بخش قلعه قاضی) is in Bandar Abbas County, Hormozgan province, Iran. Its capital is the city of Qaleh Qazi.

== History ==
After the 2006 National Census, Dehnow Rural District was established in the district, Sarkhun Rural District was transferred from it to the Central District, and the village of Qaleh Qazi was elevated to the status of a city.

== Demographics ==
=== Population ===
At the time of the 2006 census, the district's population was 17,195 in 5,763 households. The following census in 2011 counted 14,475 people in 3,751 households. The 2016 census measured the population of the district as 16,049 inhabitants in 4,399 households.

=== Administrative divisions ===
Qaleh Qazi District Population
Administrative Divisions	2006	2011	2016
Dehnow RD		4,598	5,234
Qaleh Qazi RD	12,011	4,694	5,529
Sarkhun RD (Note: Transferred to the Central District)	5,184		
Qaleh Qazi (city)		5,183	5,286
Total	17,195	14,475	16,049
RD = Rural District
