= Dar Pahn =

Dar Pahn or Dar-e Pahn (Persian: درپهن) may refer to:

- Dar Pahn, Hormozgan
- Dar Pahn, Kerman
- Dar Pahn Rural District, in Hormozgan Province
