= Cherak =

Cherak (Persian: چراك) may refer to:

- Cherak-e Bala, Hormozgan Province
- Cherak-e Pain, Hormozgan Province
- Cherak, North Khorasan, a village in Iran
- Mohamed Cherak, Algerian journalist
