= Gashiraz =

Gashiraz گشيراز
- Village
- Location within Iran
- Coordinates: 26°33′33″N 57°35′21″E
- Country: Iran
- Province: Hormozgan
- County: Minab
- Bakhsh: Senderk
- Rural District: Dar Pahn

Population (2006)
  - Total: 213
- Time zone: UTC+3:30 (IRST)
  - Summer (DST): UTC+4:30 (IRDT)

Gashiraz (Persian: گشيراز, also Romanized as Gashīrāz) is a village in Dar Pahn Rural District, Senderk District, Minab County, Hormozgan Province, Iran. At the 2006 census, its population was 213, in 46 families.
