= Deh-e Ziaratan =

Deh-e Ziaratan ده زيارتان
- Village
- Country: Iran
- Province: Hormozgan
- County: Minab
- Bakhsh: Senderk
- Rural District: Senderk

Population (2006)
  - Total: 51
- Time zone: UTC+3:30 (IRST)
  - Summer (DST): UTC+4:30 (IRDT)

Deh-e Ziaratan (Persian: ده زيارتان, also Romanized as Deh-e Zīāratān) is a village in Senderk Rural District, Senderk District, Minab County, Hormozgan Province, Iran. At the 2006 census, its population was 51 residents across 12 families.
