= Chah Hanan =

Chah Hanan چاه حنان
- Village
- Location within Iran
- Coordinates: 26°57′06″N 57°25′47″E
- Country: Iran
- Province: Hormozgan
- County: Minab
- Bakhsh: Senderk
- Rural District: Bondar

Population (2006)
  - Total: 309
- Time zone: UTC+3:30 (IRST)
  - Summer (DST): UTC+4:30 (IRDT)

Chah Hanan (Persian: چاه حنان, also Romanized as Chāh Ḩanān; also known as Chāhanan, Chāhenon, Chāh Nan, and Chāhnon) is a village in Bondar Rural District, Senderk District, Minab County, Hormozgan Province, Iran. At the 2006 census, its population was 309, in 79 families.
