= Davari =

Davari (Persian: داورئ) may refer to:

- Davari-ye Bala
- Davari-ye Pain

== People ==
- Reza Davari Ardakani, Iranian philosopher
- Daniel Davari, German-Iranian footballer
- Javad Davari, Iranian professional basketball player
- Mohammad Davari, Iranian journalist

== Other ==
- Davari Shahnameh, a 19th-century manuscript of Ferdowsi's Shahnameh
