= Posht Kalat =

Posht Kalat پشت كلات
- Village
- Location within Iran
- Coordinates: 26°58′24″N 57°24′15″E
- Country: Iran
- Province: Hormozgan
- County: Minab
- Bakhsh: Senderk
- Rural District: Bondar

Population (2006)
  - Total: 363
- Time zone: UTC+3:30 (IRST)
  - Summer (DST): UTC+4:30 (IRDT)

Posht Kalat (Persian: پشت كلات, also Romanized as Posht Kalāt) is a village in Bondar Rural District, Senderk District, Minab County, Hormozgan Province, Iran. At the 2006 census, its population was 363, in 77 families.
