= Arangu =

Arangu may refer to:

- Arangu (Pravia), Asturias, Spain
- Arangu-ye Bala, Iran
- Arangu-ye Pain, Iran
- Arangu (film), a 1991 Indian Malayalam-language film

== See also ==
- Arang (disambiguation)
