= Pishunla Key =

Pishunla Key پيشان لكي
- Village
- Location within Iran
- Coordinates: 26°55′45″N 57°33′34″E
- Country: Iran
- Province: Hormozgan
- County: Minab
- Bakhsh: Senderk
- Rural District: Senderk

Population (2006)
  - Total: 584
- Time zone: UTC+3:30 (IRST)
  - Summer (DST): UTC+4:30 (IRDT)

Pishunla Key (Persian: پيشان لكي, also Romanized as Pīshūnla Key; also known as Pīshūnlū Key) is a village in Senderk Rural District, Senderk District, Minab County, Hormozgan Province, Iran. At the 2006 census, its population was 584, in 128 families.
