= Charubuni =

ghaem abad قائم آباد
- Village
- Location within Iran
- Coordinates: 27°01′52″N 57°23′24″E
- Country: Iran
- Province: Hormozgan
- County: Minab
- Bakhsh: Senderk
- Rural District: Bondar

Population (2006)
  - Total: 118
- Time zone: UTC+3:30 (IRST)
  - Summer (DST): UTC+4:30 (IRDT)

ghaem abad (Persian: قائم آباد, also Romanized as Charūbūnī; also known as Chardbūnī) is a village in Bondar Rural District, Senderk District, Minab County, Hormozgan Province, Iran. At the 2006 census, its population was 118, in 30 families.
