= Shivehi =

Shivehi شيوه اي
- Village
- Location within Iran
- Coordinates: 26°53′33″N 57°25′47″E
- Country: Iran
- Province: Hormozgan
- County: Minab
- Bakhsh: Senderk
- Rural District: Senderk

Population (2006)
  - Total: 214
- Time zone: UTC+3:30 (IRST)
  - Summer (DST): UTC+4:30 (IRDT)

Shivehi (Persian: شيوه اي, also Romanized as Shīveh'ī) is a village in Senderk Rural District, Senderk District, Minab County, Hormozgan Province, Iran. At the 2006 census, its population was 214, in 38 families.
