= Sarmazegh =

Sarmazegh سرمازغ
- Village
- Location within Iran
- Coordinates: 26°50′29″N 57°24′26″E
- Country: Iran
- Province: Hormozgan
- County: Minab
- Bakhsh: Senderk
- Rural District: Senderk

Population (2006)
  - Total: 506
- Time zone: UTC+3:30 (IRST)
  - Summer (DST): UTC+4:30 (IRDT)

Sarmazegh (Persian: سرمازغ, also Romanized as Sarmāzegh; also known as Sarmāzeq) is a village in Senderk Rural District, Senderk District, Minab County, Hormozgan Province, Iran. At the 2006 census, its population was 506, in 123 families.
