= Dargelu =

Dargelu درگلو
- Village
- Location within Iran
- Coordinates: 26°52′09″N 57°27′00″E
- Country: Iran
- Province: Hormozgan
- County: Minab
- Bakhsh: Senderk
- Rural District: Senderk

Population (2006)
  - Total: 311
- Time zone: UTC+3:30 (IRST)
  - Summer (DST): UTC+4:30 (IRDT)

Dargelu (Persian: درگلو, also Romanized as Dargelū; also known as Dargīlū) is a village in Senderk Rural District, Senderk District, Minab County, Hormozgan Province, Iran. At the 2006 census, its population was 311, in 64 families.
