= Benambani =

Benambani بنم باني
- Village
- Location within Iran
- Coordinates: 26°40′04″N 57°21′56″E
- Country: Iran
- Province: Hormozgan
- County: Minab
- Bakhsh: Senderk
- Rural District: Dar Pahn

Population (2006)
  - Total: 127
- Time zone: UTC+3:30 (IRST)
  - Summer (DST): UTC+4:30 (IRDT)

Benambani (Persian: بنم باني, also Romanized as Benambānī; also known as Benahbānī) is a village in Dar Pahn Rural District, Senderk District, Minab County, Hormozgan Province, Iran. At the 2006 census, its population was 127, in 27 families.
