= Mosheka ol Din =

Mosheka ol Din مشكاالدين
- Village
- Location within Iran
- Coordinates: 26°59′49″N 57°38′41″E
- Country: Iran
- Province: Hormozgan
- County: Minab
- Bakhsh: Senderk
- Rural District: Bondar

Population (2006)
  - Total: 18
- Time zone: UTC+3:30 (IRST)
  - Summer (DST): UTC+4:30 (IRDT)

Mosheka ol Din (Persian: مشكاالدين, also Romanized as Moshekā ol Dīn; also known as Mogh Shekāleddīn and Mogh Shekāl od Dīn) is a village in Bondar Rural District, Senderk District, Minab County, Hormozgan Province, Iran. At the 2006 census, its population was 18, in 6 families.
