= Tam Babol =

Tam Babol تم بابل
- Village
- Location within Iran
- Coordinates: 27°02′19″N 57°23′42″E
- Country: Iran
- Province: Hormozgan
- County: Minab
- Bakhsh: Senderk
- Rural District: Bondar

Population (2006)
  - Total: 170
- Time zone: UTC+3:30 (IRST)
  - Summer (DST): UTC+4:30 (IRDT)

Tam Babol (Persian: تم بابل, also Romanized as Tam Bābol) is a village in Bondar Rural District, Senderk District, Minab County, Hormozgan Province, Iran. At the 2006 census, its population was 170, in 34 families.
