= Beneh Kan =

Beneh Kan بنهكان
- Village
- Location within Iran
- Coordinates: 26°52′30″N 57°28′17″E
- Country: Iran
- Province: Hormozgan
- County: Minab
- Bakhsh: Senderk
- Rural District: Senderk

Population (2006)
  - Total: 632
- Time zone: UTC+3:30 (IRST)
  - Summer (DST): UTC+4:30 (IRDT)

Beneh Kan (Persian: بنهكان, also Romanized as Beneh Kān) is a village in Senderk Rural District, Senderk District, Minab County, Hormozgan Province, Iran. At the 2006 census, its population was 632, in 116 families.
