= Chah Kharu =

Chah Kharu چاه خارو
- Village
- Location within Iran
- Coordinates: 27°01′39″N 57°33′39″E
- Country: Iran
- Province: Hormozgan
- County: Minab
- Bakhsh: Senderk
- Rural District: Bondar

Population (2006)
  - Total: 20
- Time zone: UTC+3:30 (IRST)
  - Summer (DST): UTC+4:30 (IRDT)

Chah Kharu (Persian: چاه خارو, also Romanized as Chāh Khārū; also known as Chāh Khārūk) is a village in Bondar Rural District, Senderk District, Minab County, Hormozgan Province, Iran. At the 2006 census, its population was 20, in 5 families.
