= Kashpiri =

Kashpiri كش پيري
- Village
- Location within Iran
- Coordinates: 26°36′36″N 57°35′03″E
- Country: Iran
- Province: Hormozgan
- County: Minab
- Bakhsh: Senderk
- Rural District: Dar Pahn

Population (2006)
  - Total: 163
- Time zone: UTC+3:30 (IRST)
  - Summer (DST): UTC+4:30 (IRDT)

Kashpiri (Persian: كش پيري, also Romanized as Kashpīrī) is a village in Dar Pahn Rural District, Senderk District, Minab County, Hormozgan Province, Iran. At the 2006 census, its population was 163, in 29 families.
