= Cherak-e Pain =

Cherak-e Pain چراك پايين
- Village
- Location within Iran
- Coordinates: 26°54′33″N 57°23′58″E
- Country: Iran
- Province: Hormozgan
- County: Minab
- Bakhsh: Senderk
- Rural District: Bondar

Population (2006)
  - Total: 113
- Time zone: UTC+3:30 (IRST)
  - Summer (DST): UTC+4:30 (IRDT)

Cherak-e Pain (Persian: چراك پايين, also Romanized as Cherāk-e Pā’īn; also known as Shahrāndak and Cherāk) is a village in Bondar Rural District, Senderk District, Minab County, Hormozgan province, Iran. At the 2006 census, its population was 113, in 20 families.
