= Arang (disambiguation) =

Arang may refer to:

- Arang, town and a nagar panchayat in Raipur District in the state of Chhattisgarh, India
- Arang (film) (아랑, Arang), 2006 South Korean horror film
- Arang (Korean folklore), figure in the folklore of the Miryang area of Korea
- Tale of Arang, a 2012 South Korean MBC television series
- Arang (musical), a 2002 South Korean original musical, recreated in 2026 with a newly written book and score

== See also ==
- Arangu (disambiguation)
- Batu Arang, coal main mining town in Selangor, Malaysia
- Calon Arang, character in Javanese and Balinese folklore from the 12th century
- Aarong, Bangladeshi department stores
