= Cherak-e Bala =

Cherak-e Bala چراك بالا
- Village
- Location within Iran
- Coordinates: 26°55′44″N 57°23′35″E
- Country: Iran
- Province: Hormozgan
- County: Minab
- Bakhsh: Senderk
- Rural District: Bondar

Population (2006)
  - Total: 114
- Time zone: UTC+3:30 (IRST)
  - Summer (DST): UTC+4:30 (IRDT)

Cherak-e Bala (Persian: چراك بالا, also Romanized as Cherāk-e Bālā; also known as Pas-e Gardaneh) is a village in Bondar Rural District, Senderk District, Minab County, Hormozgan Province, Iran. At the 2006 census, its population was 114, in 31 families.
