= Arangu-ye Pain =

Arangu-ye Pain ارنگوپائين
- Village
- Location within Iran
- Coordinates: 26°49′35″N 57°25′15″E
- Country: Iran
- Province: Hormozgan
- County: Minab
- Bakhsh: Senderk
- Rural District: Senderk

Population (2006)
  - Total: 343
- Time zone: UTC+3:30 (IRST)
  - Summer (DST): UTC+4:30 (IRDT)

Arangu-ye Pain (Persian: ارنگوپائين, also Romanized as Ārangū-ye Pā’īn and Ārangū Pā’īn) is a village in Senderk Rural District, Senderk District, Minab County, Hormozgan Province, Iran. At the 2006 census, its population was 343, in 74 families.
