= Garu, Minab =

Village in Hormozgan province, Iran

Garu Persian: گرو
- Village
- Location within Iran
- Coordinates: 26°50′32″N 57°16′54″E
- Country: Iran
- Province: Hormozgan
- County: Minab
- District: Senderk
- Rural District: Senderk

Population (2016)
  - Total: 2,336
- Time zone: UTC+3:30 (IRST)

Garu (Persian: گرو) (Note: Also romanized as Garū) is a village in Senderk Rural District of Senderk District, Minab County, Hormozgan province, Iran.

== Demographics ==
=== Population ===
At the time of the 2006 National Census, the village's population was 1,971 in 366 households. The following census in 2011 counted 2,113 people in 440 households. The 2016 census measured the population of the village as 2,336 people in 594 households. It was the most populous village in its rural district.
