= Gudi =

Gudi may refer to:

- Gudi (instrument), a type of ancient Chinese flute
- Gudi, Iran, a village in Hormozgan Province, Iran
- Gudi, a term for a Hindu temple
- The gudi, a symbol associated with the Hindu new year in India
  - Gudi Padwa, Marathi and Konkani Hindu new year festival
- Gudi Gantalu (lit. 'Temple bells'), a 1964 Indian Telugu-language film
