= Arangu-ye Bala =

Arangu-ye Bala ارنگوبالا
- Village
- Location within Iran
- Coordinates: 26°49′16″N 57°26′01″E
- Country: Iran
- Province: Hormozgan
- County: Minab
- Bakhsh: Senderk
- Rural District: Senderk

Population (2006)
  - Total: 655
- Time zone: UTC+3:30 (IRST)
  - Summer (DST): UTC+4:30 (IRDT)

Arangu-ye Bala (Persian: ارنگوبالا, also Romanized as Ārangū-ye Bālā and Ārangū Bālā; also known as Ārangū, Āremgū, and Ārengūy-e Bālā) is a village in Senderk Rural District, Senderk District, Minab County, Hormozgan Province, Iran. At the 2006 census, its population was 655, in 135 families.
