= Davari-ye Bala =

Davari-ye Bala داوري بالا
- Village
- Location within Iran
- Coordinates: 26°34′33″N 57°36′13″E
- Country: Iran
- Province: Hormozgan
- County: Minab
- Bakhsh: Senderk
- Rural District: Dar Pahn

Population (2006)
  - Total: 290
- Time zone: UTC+3:30 (IRST)
  - Summer (DST): UTC+4:30 (IRDT)

Davari-ye Bala (Persian: داوري بالا, also Romanized as Dāvarī-ye Bālā; also known as Dāvarī) is a village in Dar Pahn Rural District, Senderk District, Minab County, Hormozgan Province, Iran. At the 2006 census, its population was 290, in 61 families.
