= Darjadun =

Village in Hormozgan province, Iran

Darjadun Persian: درجادون
- Village
- Location within Iran
- Coordinates: 26°34′21″N 57°36′29″E
- Country: Iran
- Province: Hormozgan
- County: Minab
- District: Senderk
- Rural District: Darpahn

Population (2016)
  - Total: 982
- Time zone: UTC+3:30 (IRST)

Darjadun (Persian: درجادون) (Note: Also romanized as Darjādūn; also known as Sarsarūgh) is a village in Darpahn Rural District of Senderk District, Minab County, Hormozgan province, Iran.

== Demographics ==
=== Population ===
At the time of the 2006 National Census, the village's population was 614 in 127 households. The following census in 2011 counted 916 people in 204 households. The 2016 census measured the population of the village as 982 people in 216 households. It was the most populous village in its rural district.
