= Bondar, Minab =

Village in Hormozgan province, Iran

Bondar Persian: بندر
- Village
- Location within Iran
- Coordinates: 26°58′22″N 57°24′58″E
- Country: Iran
- Province: Hormozgan
- County: Minab
- District: Senderk
- Rural District: Bondar

Population (2016)
  - Total: 492
- Time zone: UTC+3:30 (IRST)

Bondar (Persian: بندر) is a village in, and the capital of, Bondar Rural District of Senderk District, Minab County, Hormozgan province, Iran.

== Demographics ==
=== Population ===
At the time of the 2006 National Census, the village's population was 449 in 101 households. The following census in 2011 counted 622 people in 149 households. The 2016 census measured the population of the village as 492 people in 127 households. It was the most populous village in its rural district.
