= Senderk =

City in Hormozgan province, Iran

Senderk Persian: سندرك
- City
- Location within Iran
- Coordinates: 26°50′13″N 57°25′38″E
- Country: Iran
- Province: Hormozgan
- County: Minab
- District: Senderk

Population (2016)
  - Total: 1,915
- Time zone: UTC+3:30 (IRST)

Senderk (Persian: سندرك) (Note: Also romanized as Sandarak, Sanderk, Sendaraic, and Sendarak; also known as Senderg and Sindrik) is a city in, and the capital of, Senderk District of Minab County, Hormozgan province, Iran. It also serves as the administrative center for Senderk Rural District.

== Demographics ==
=== Population ===
At the time of the 2006 National Census, Senderk's population was 1,284 in 277 households, when it was a village in Senderk Rural District. The following census in 2011 counted 2,024 people in 381 households, by which time the village had been elevated to the status of a city. The 2016 census measured the population of the city as 1,915 people in 459 households.
