= Dhamek Stupa =

Post Gupta-era stupa at Sarnath, Uttar Pradesh, India

Dhamek Stupa धमेख स्तूप (in Hindi)
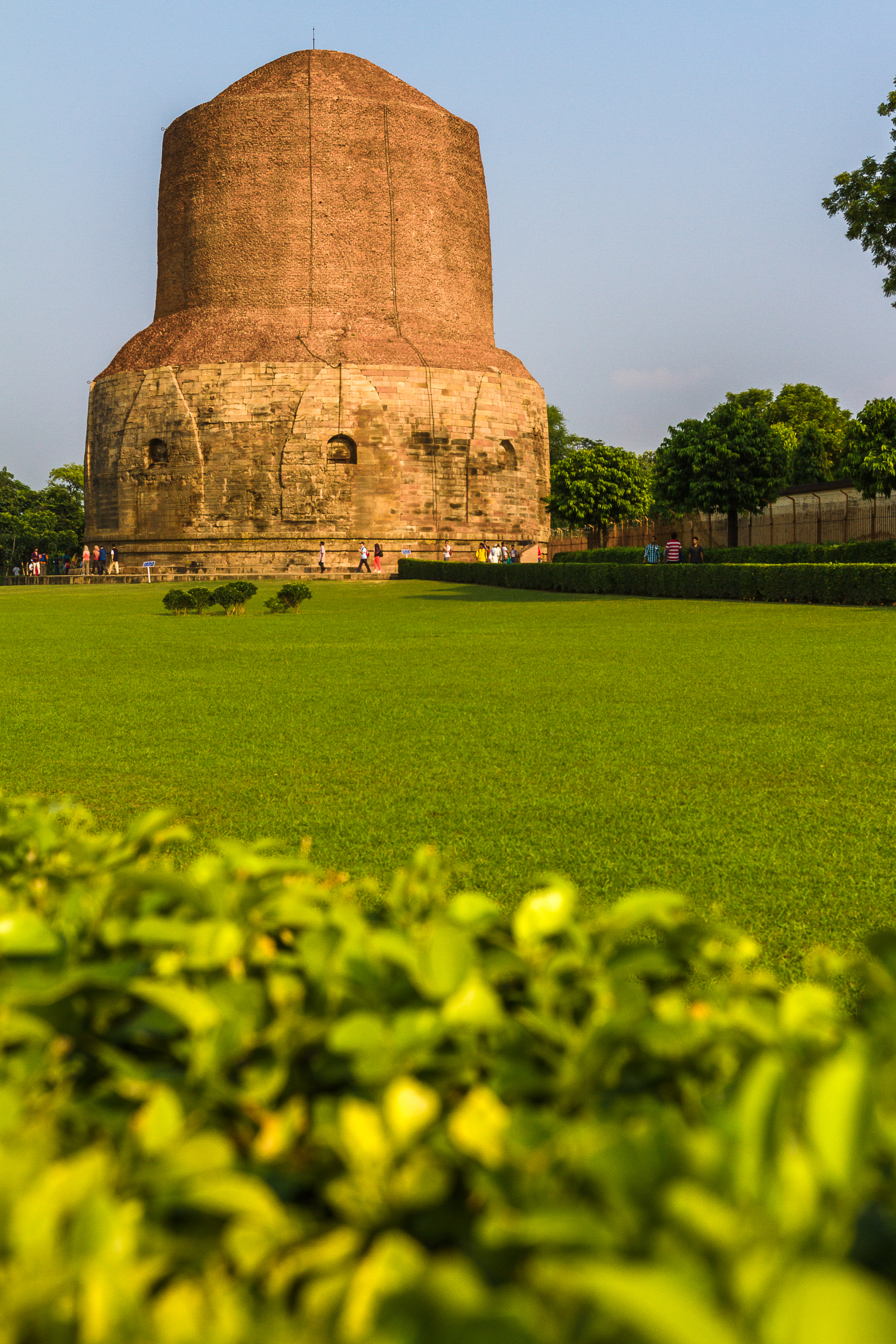
- Dhamek Stupa is located in Sarnath, Varanasi, Uttar Pradesh, India

- Location in Uttar Pradesh, India Dhamek Stupa (Uttar Pradesh)

Religion
- Affiliation: Buddhism
- Status: Preserved

Location
- Location: Sarnath, Varanasi, Uttar Pradesh, India
- Administration: Archaeological Survey of India
- Coordinates: 25.3808°N 83.0245°E

Architecture
- Type: Stupa
- Style: Buddhist, Mauryan art
- Completed: 5th-6th century AD

Specifications
- Length: 28 metres (92 feet)
- Width: 28 metres (92 feet)
- Height (max): 43 metres (141 feet)
- Materials: white makrana marble

Dhamek Stupa (also spelled Dhamekh and Dhamekha) is a massive stupa located in Deer Park at Sarnath in the state of Uttar Pradesh, India. One of the eight most important pilgrimage sites for Buddhists, the Dhamek Stupa marks the location where the Buddha gave his first teaching to his first five disciples Kaundinya, Assaji, Bhaddiya, Vappa and Mahanama. All five disciples eventually became fully liberated. According to the Lalitavistara sutra, the Buddha said he chooses "Deer Park by the Hill of the Fallen Sages, outside of Varanasi" for the location of his first teachings of Buddhism.

== Etymology ==
The name Dhamek derives from the Sanskrit word dharmeksā, which means "pondering of the law" in the Sanskrit language.

== Location ==
Dhamek Stupa is located in Deer Park at Sarnath, which is located 8 kilometres (5.0 miles) to the northeast of Varanasi. The ancient city of Banares, or Varanasi, was outside of Sarnath during the Buddha's time. According to the Lalitavistara sutra, when the Buddha decided to teach, he chose "Deer Park by the Hill of the Fallen Sages, outside of Varanasi".

== Description ==
Dhamek Stupa is the most massive structure in Sarnath. In its current shape, the stupa is a solid cylinder of bricks and stone reaching a height of 43.6 meters and having a diameter of 28 meters. The basement seems to have survived from Ashoka's structure, while the stone facing displays delicate floral carvings characteristic of the Gupta era. The wall is covered with exquisitely carved figures of humans and birds, as well as inscriptions in Brahmi script. The stupa was enlarged on six occasions but the upper part is still unfinished. While visiting Sarnath in 640 CE, Xuanzang recorded that the colony had over 1,500 priests and the main stupa was nearly 300 feet (91 m) high.

An Ashoka pillar with an edict engraved on it stands near the site.

== History ==
Dhamek Stupa marks the location where the Buddha gave his first teaching to his first five disciples Kaundinya, Assaji, Bhaddiya, Vappa and Mahanama. All five eventually became fully liberated. This event also marked the formation of the sangha. Several of the ancient sources describe the site of this first teaching as a Mriga-dayaa-vanam or a sanctuary for animals, which was the founding reason for the establishment of Deer Park by a local king. In Sanskrit, the word mriga is used in the sense of game animals, with deer being the most common.

After the parinirvana of the Buddha, his remains were cremated and the ashes were divided and buried under eight stupas, with two further stupas encasing the urn and the embers. The Dhamek Stupa was presumably among these eight stupas. The Mauryan King Ashoka may have commissioned the stupa's expansion. The contemporary profile of the Dhamek Stupa has been conclusively dated to the Gupta Empire and the 5th-6th century CE.

A 17th-century Jain manuscript describes a Jain temple in Varanasi as a pilgrimage site for Jains. The temple is located close to "a famous Bodisattva sanctuary" at a place called dharmeksā.

In what is the first incontrovertible reference to the ruins at Sarnath, Jonathan Duncan (a charter member of the Asiatic Society and later Governor of Bombay) described the discovery of a green marble reliquary encased in a sandstone box in the relic chamber of a brick stupa at that location. The reliquary was discovered in January 1794, during the dismantling of a stupa (referred to by Alexander Cunningham as stupa "K" or the "Jagat Singh stupa", later identified as the Dharmarajika Stupa) by employees of Babu Jagat Singh (the Aumil of parganas Shivpur & Katehar and Nephew of Raja Balwant Singh of Benares). Duncan published his observations in 1799 with the periodical of the Asiatic Society. The reliquary contained a few bones and some pearls, which were subsequently immersed in the Ganges river. The reliquary itself, although sent over to the Asiatic Society, disappeared. The outer sandstone box once containing the reliquary was rediscovered by Cunningham in 1835. The bricks of the stupa were hauled off and used for the construction of the market in Jagatganj, Varanasi. Jagat Singh and his crew also removed a large part of the facing of the Dhamek Stupa, and removed several Buddha statues which he retained at his house in Jagatganj.

== Gallery ==
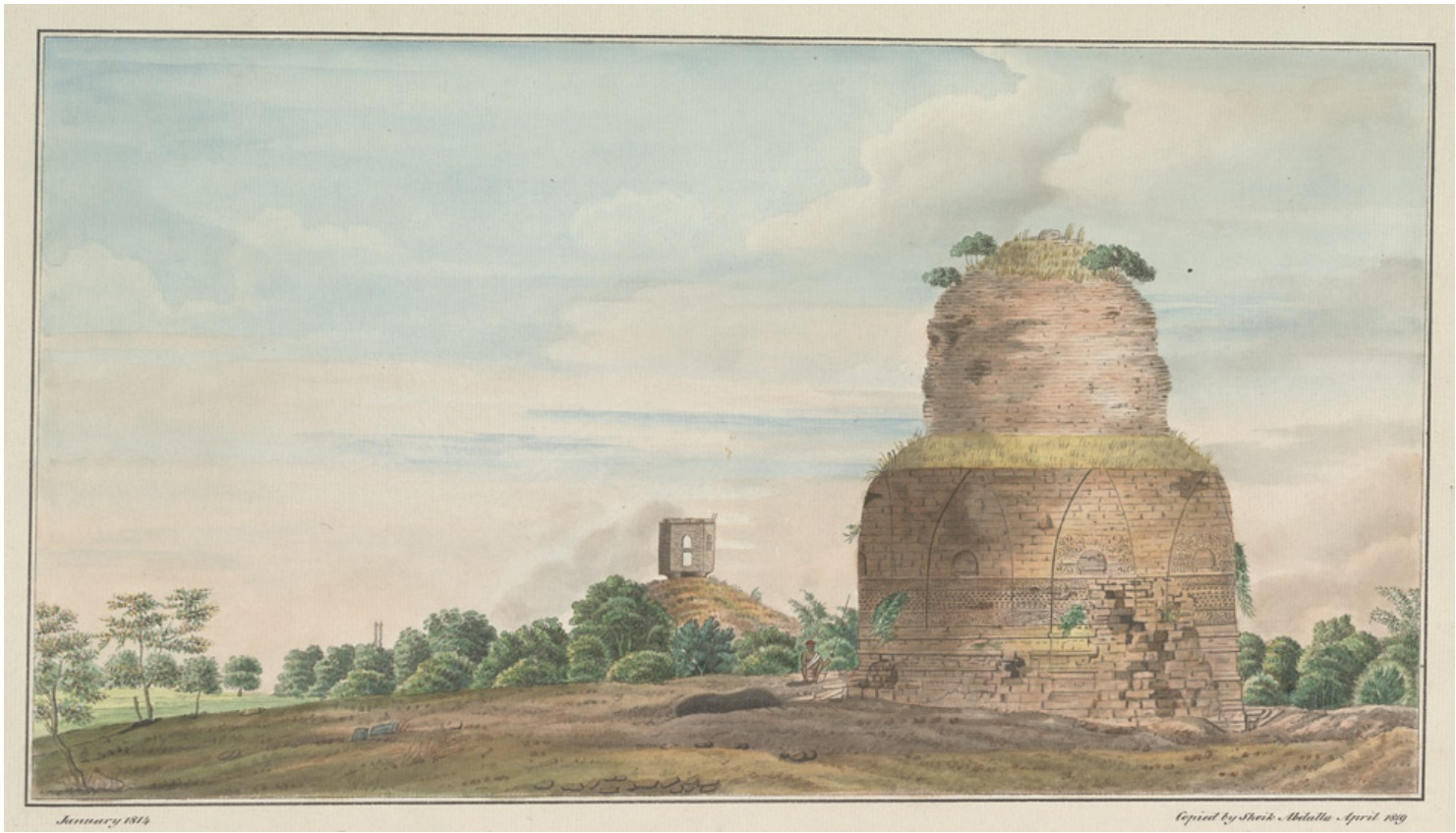
As it appeared in 1814

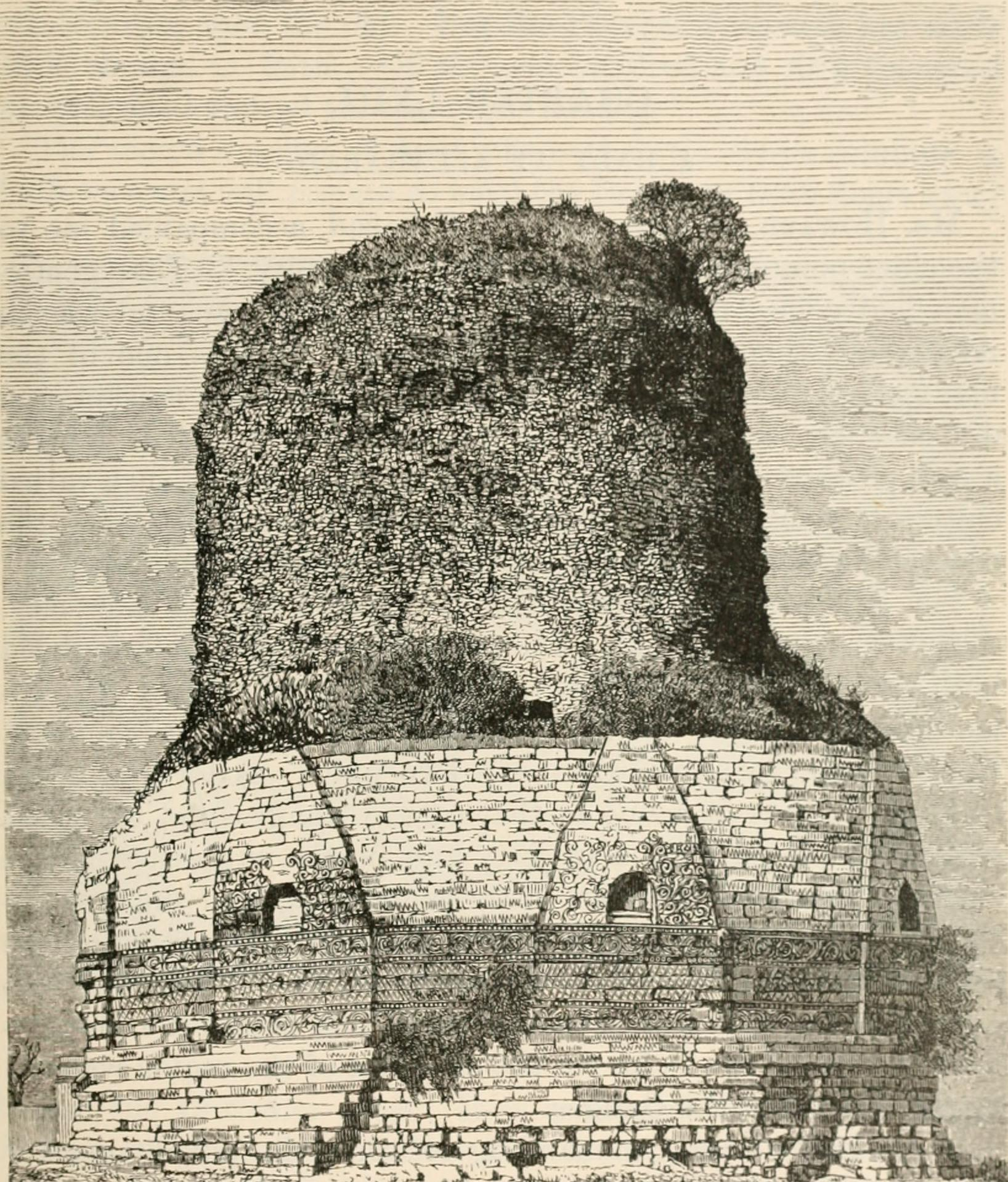
As it appeared in 1891

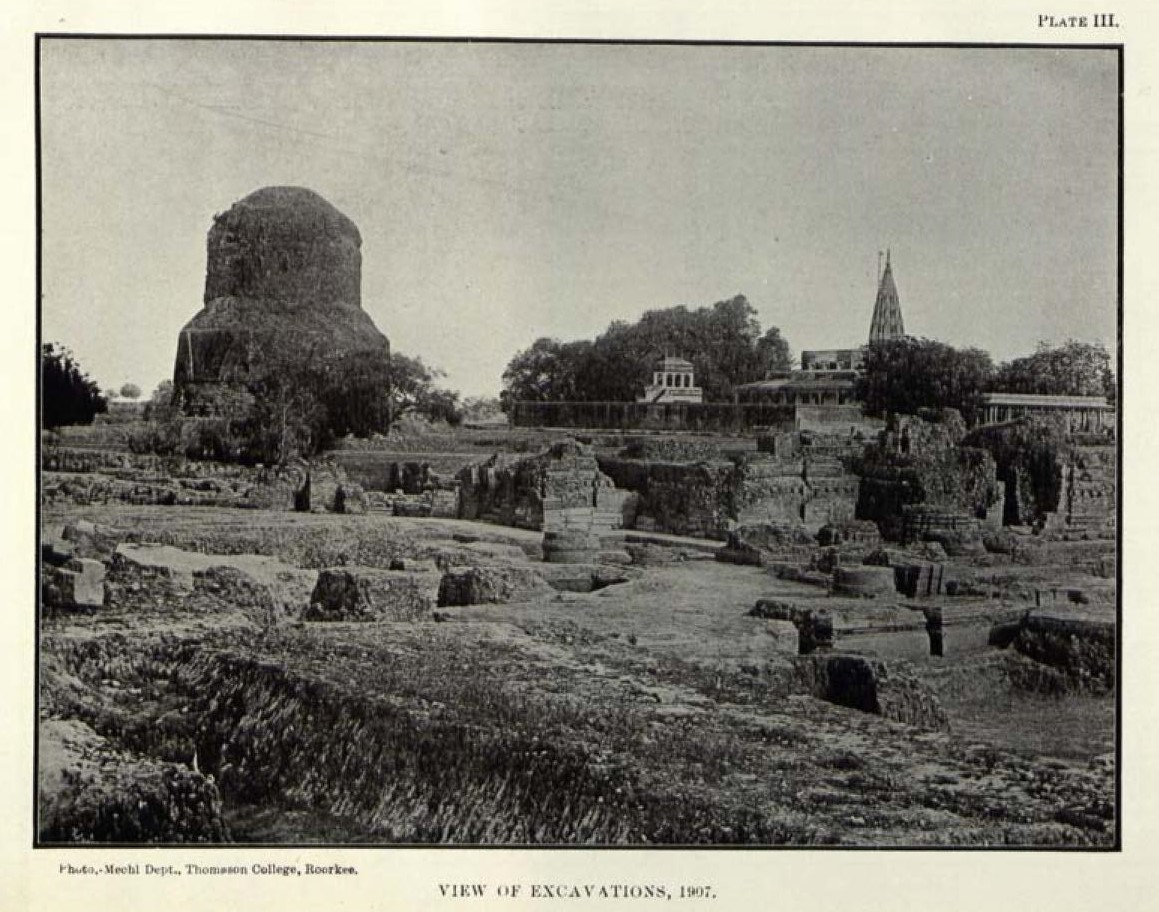
As it appeared in 1905. Camera angle from the ruins of the ancient Mulagandha Kuty Vihara towards the Dhamek Stupa; the Sri Digamber Jain temple can be seen on the right side of the photograph.

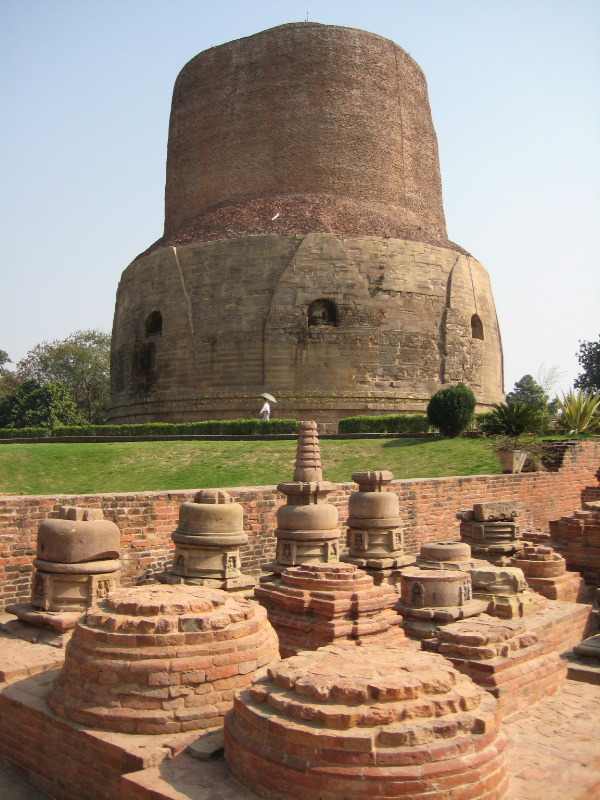
As it appeared in 2008

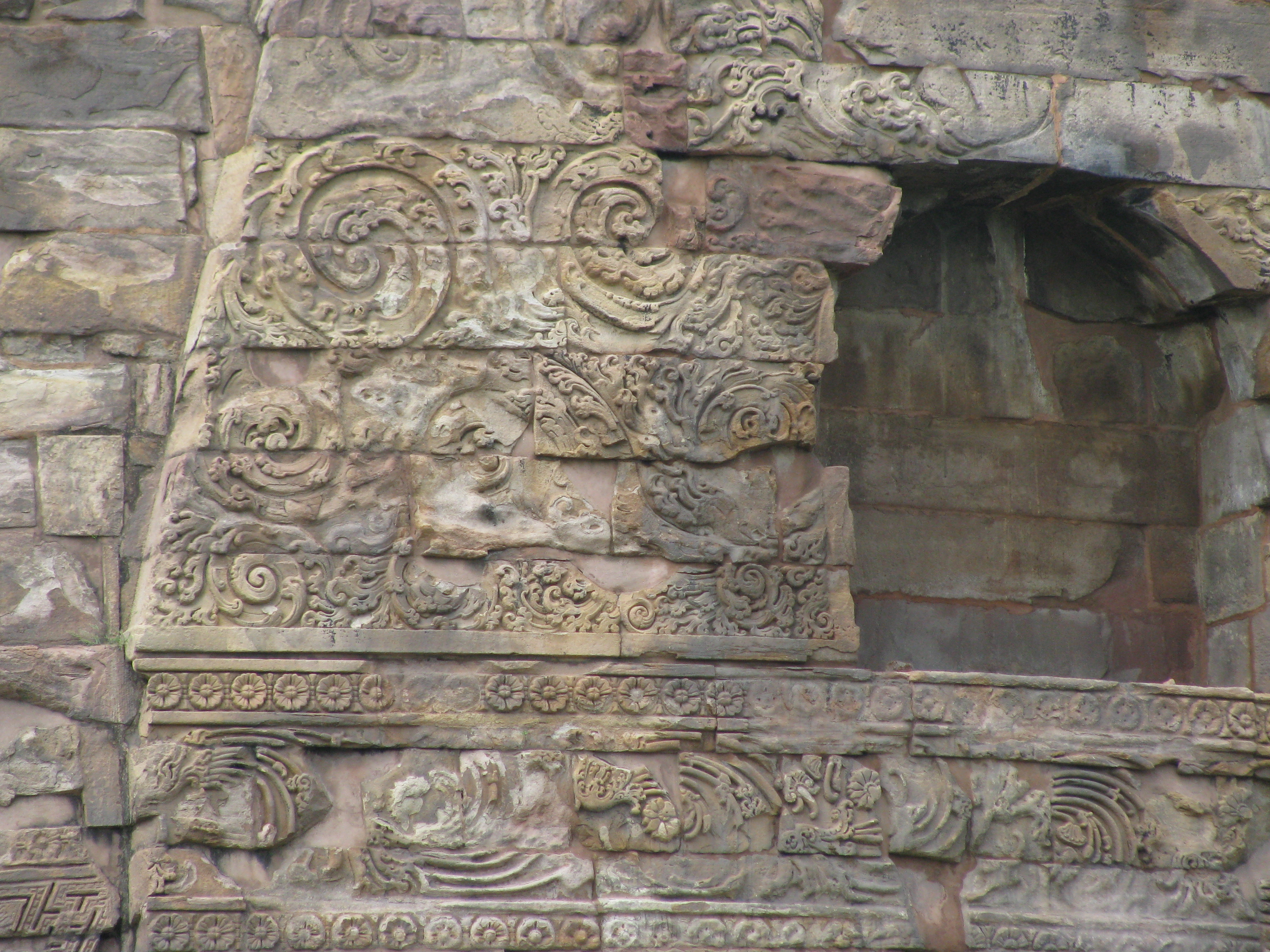
Dhamekh Stupa wall close-up, as it appeared in 2008

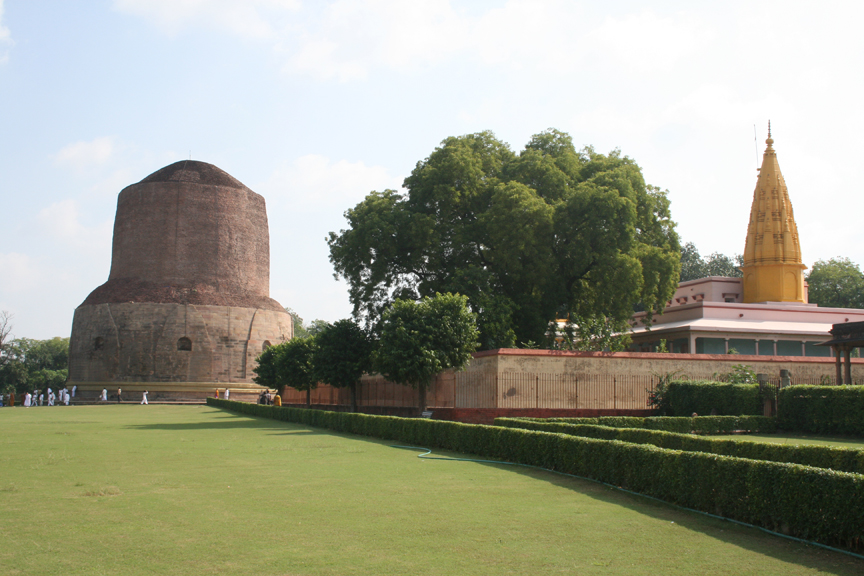
As it appeared in 2009

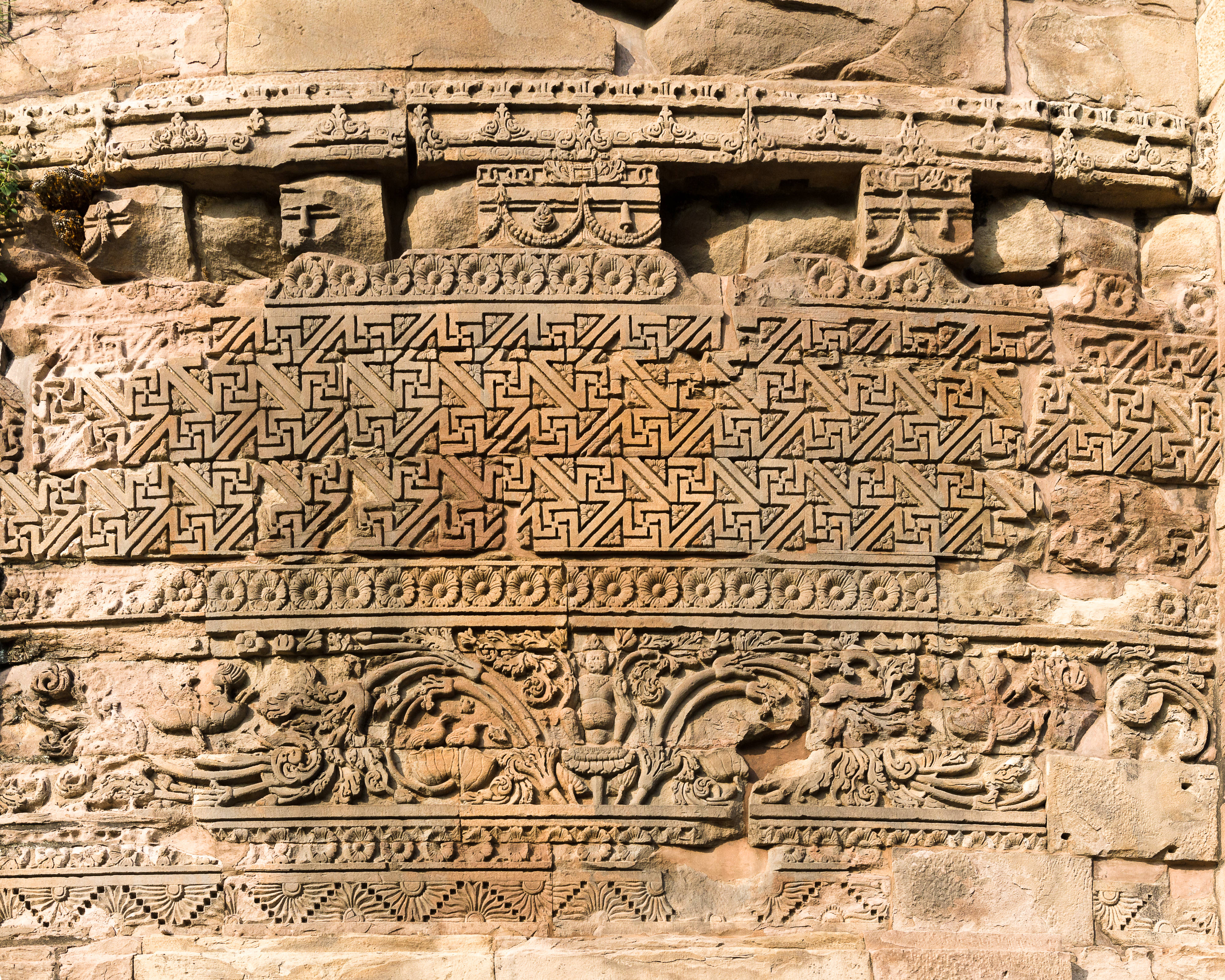
As it appeared in 2009 (close-up view)

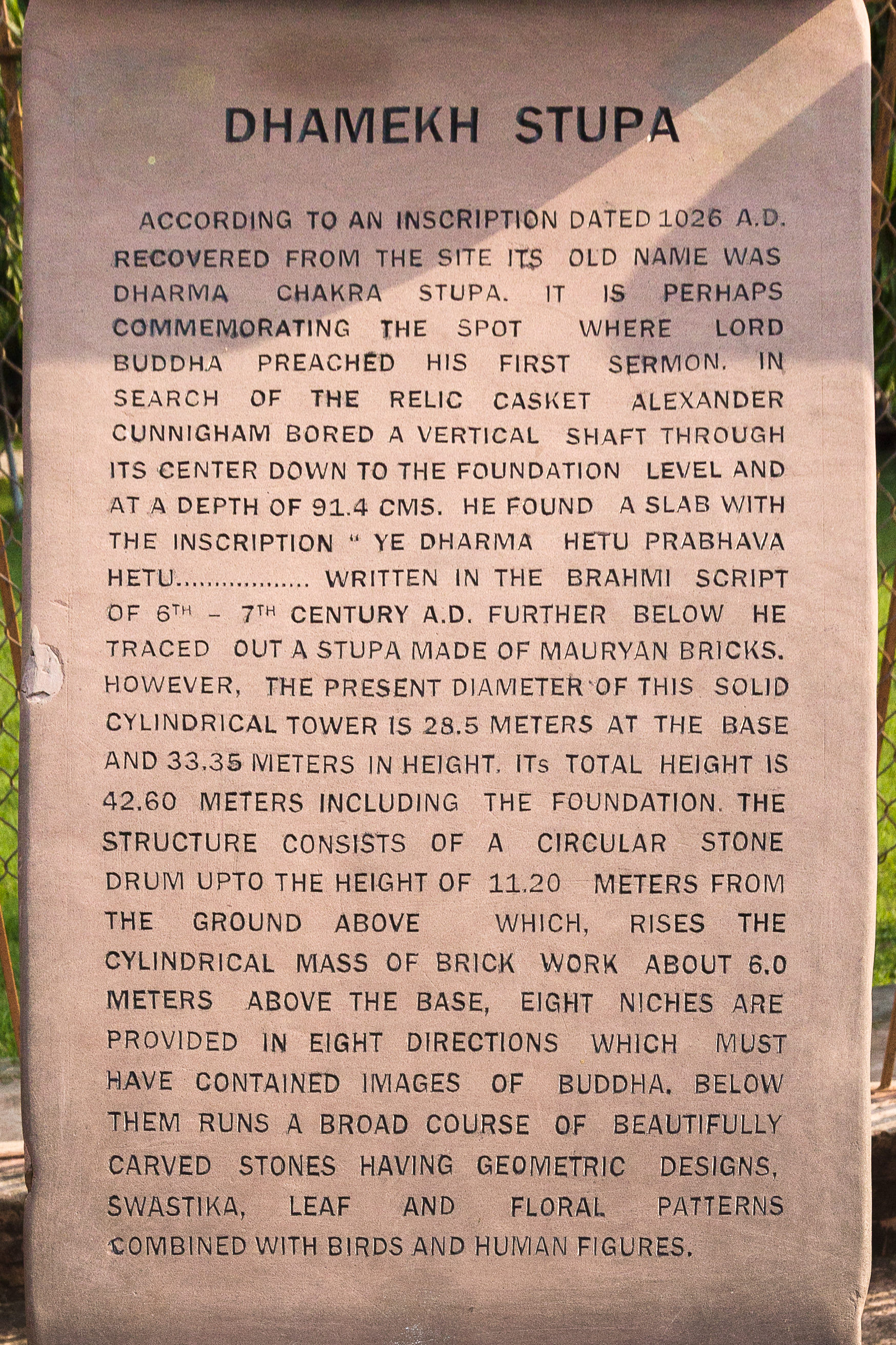
Plaque at Sarnath historical site, outlining the history of Dhamekh Stupa (2010)

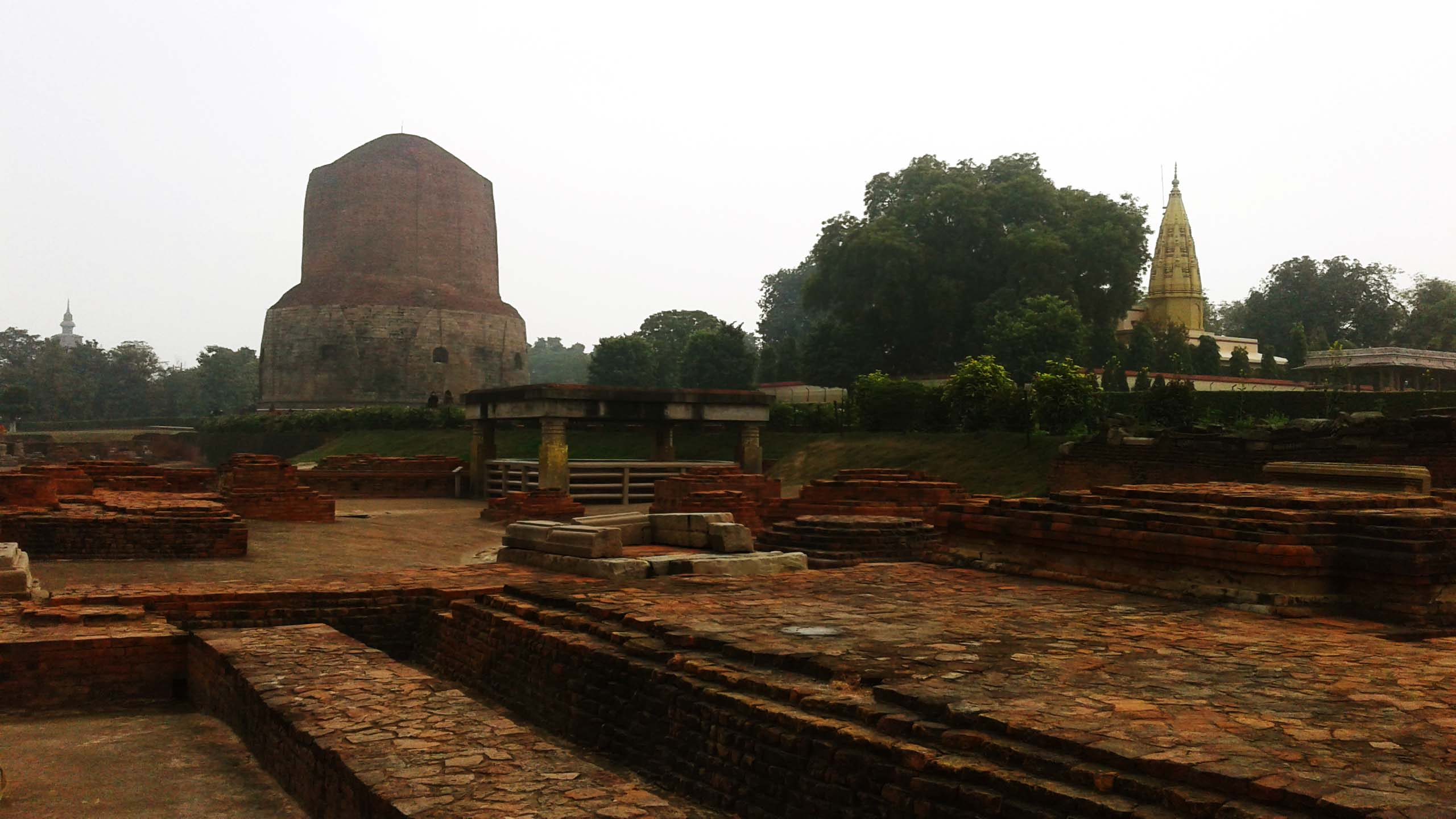
As it appeared in 2019. Camera angle from the ruins of the ancient Mulagandha Kuti Vihar towards the Dhamek Stupa; the Shreyanshnath Jain Temple can be seen on the right side of the photograph (the Panchayatan Temple can also be seen in the middle).

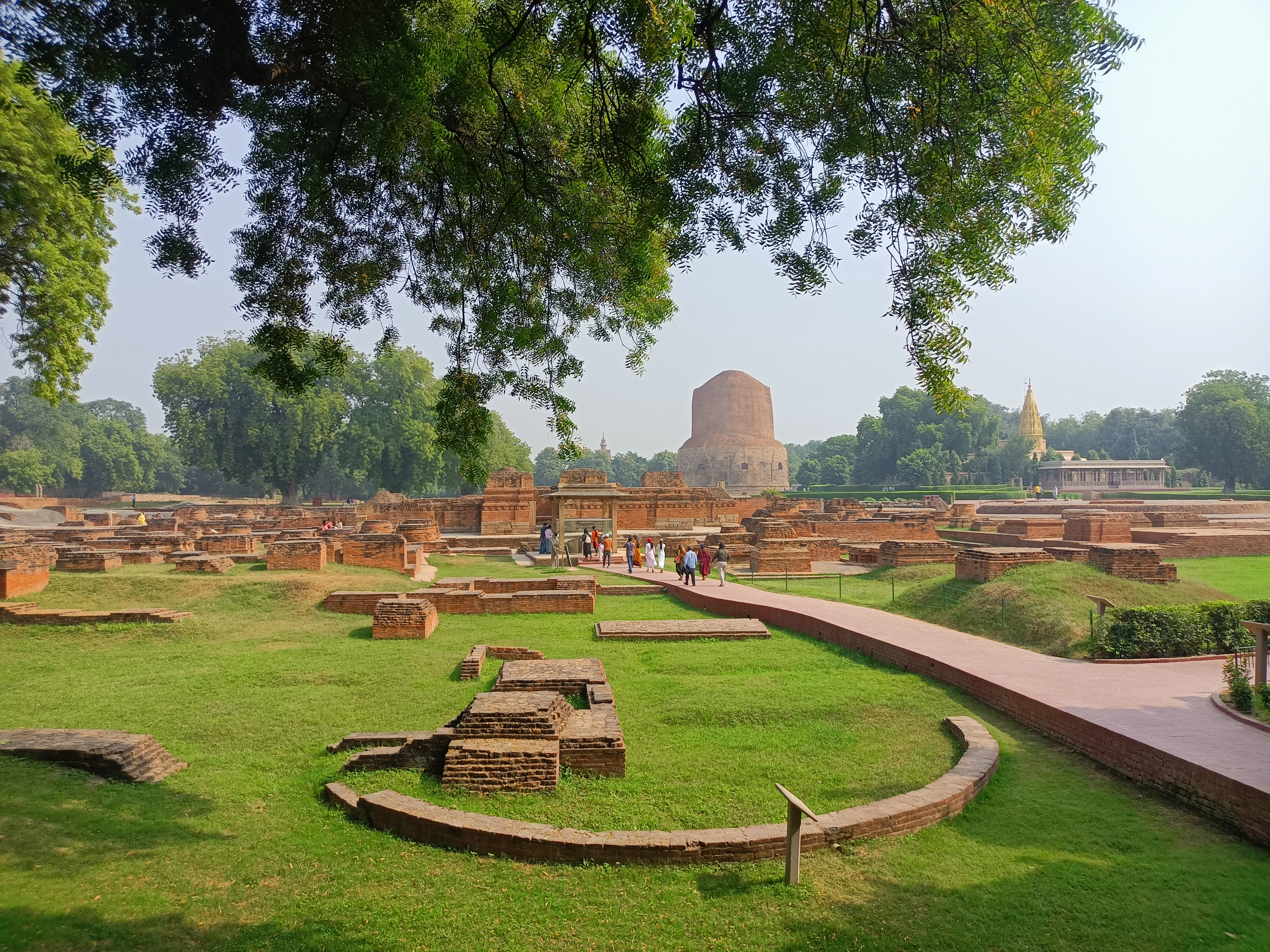
As it appeared in 2023. Camera angle from the far north of the ruins.

== Cited works ==
- Asher, Frederick M. (2020). Sarnath: A Critical History of the Place Where Buddhism Began. Los Angeles: Getty Research Institute. ISBN 978-1606066164.
- Cunningham, Alexander (1871). "Banaras Sarnath". Four reports made during the years 1862-63-64-65. Vol. 1. Shimla, Himachal Pradesh, India: Archaeological Survey of India. pp. 103–130.
- Duncan, Johnathan (1799). "An Account of the Discovery of Two Urns in the Vicinity of Benares". Transactions of the Society Instituted in Bengal, for enquiring into the History and Antiquities, the Arts, Sciences and Literature, of Asia. 5: 131–3.
- Oertel, Friedrich Oscar (1908). "Excavations at Sarnath". Archaeological Survey of India Annual Report, 1904–1905. Calcutta: Superintendent Government Printing, India.
- Sahni, Daya Ram (1917). Guide to the Buddhist ruins of Sarnath. Calcutta: Archaeological Survey of India.
- Sherring, Matthew Atmore (1868). Benares: The Sacred City of the Hindus. Delhi: B. R. Publishing Corporation.
