= Arang =

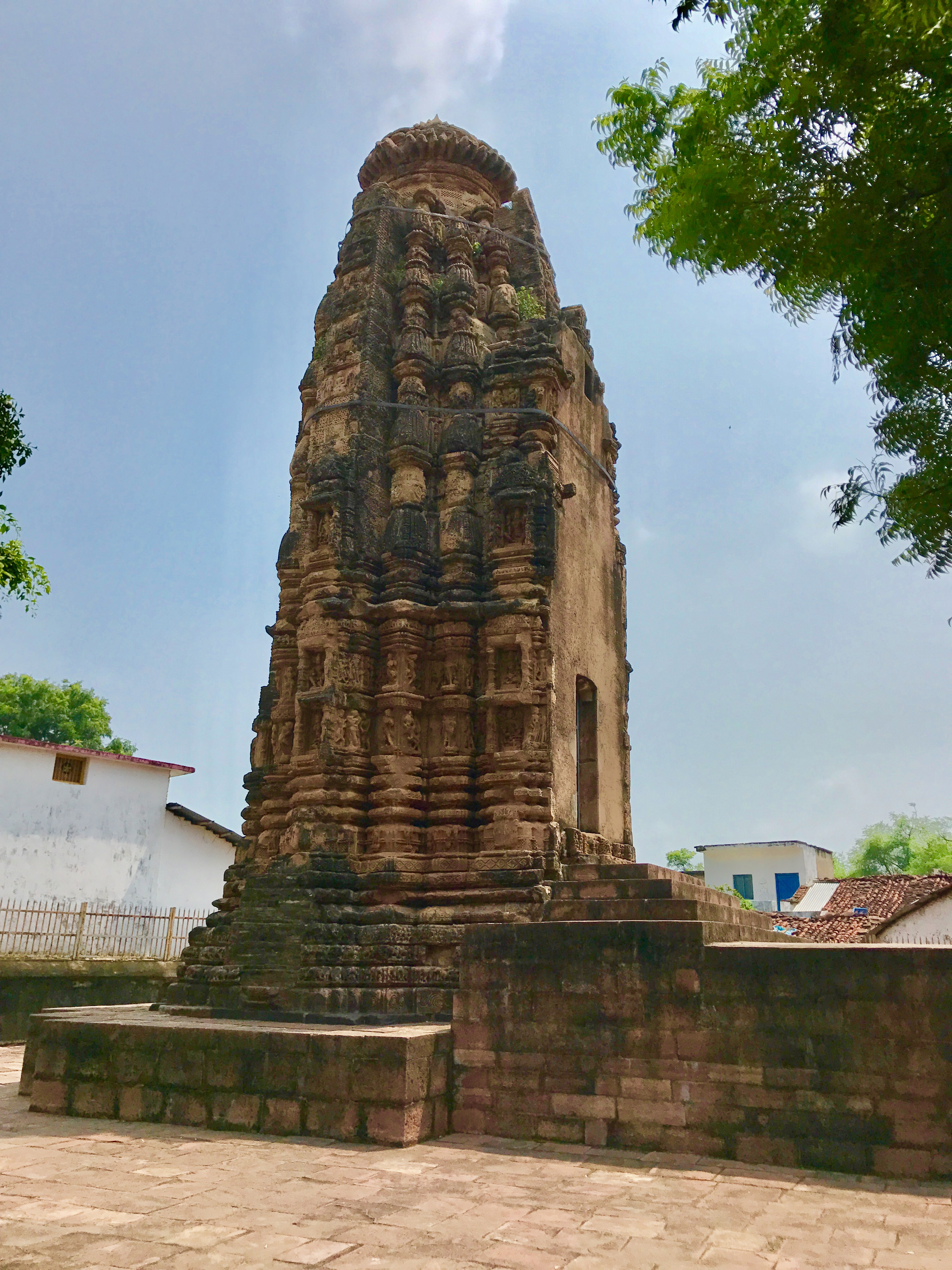
- Bhand Dewal Temple
- Interactive map of Arang
- Country: India

Arang, also known as "The town of temples" of Chhattisgarh, is a block and a Nagar Palika in Raipur District in the state of Chhattisgarh, India. It is situated near the eastern limits of Raipur City and close to Mahasamund City. Arang is an ancient town, which was ruled by the Haihayas Rajput dynasty. It is famous for its many Jain and Hindu temples which belong to the 11th and 12th centuries; these are the Mand Deval Jain temple, the Mahamaya temple, the Panchmukhi temple and the Hanuman temple. Due to the Archaeological finds of a copper plate inscription dated to the Gupta Empire, known as the Arang Plate of Bhimasena II of the clan of Rajarsitulya, has established the town's ancient history as a Hindu and Jain religious centre, which was then under the rule of Hindu kings. The Mand Deval Jain temple is the most ancient of these temples dated to the 11th century where three huge images of Digambara tirthankaras are deified in the sanctum sanctorum; these are carved in black stone and polished.

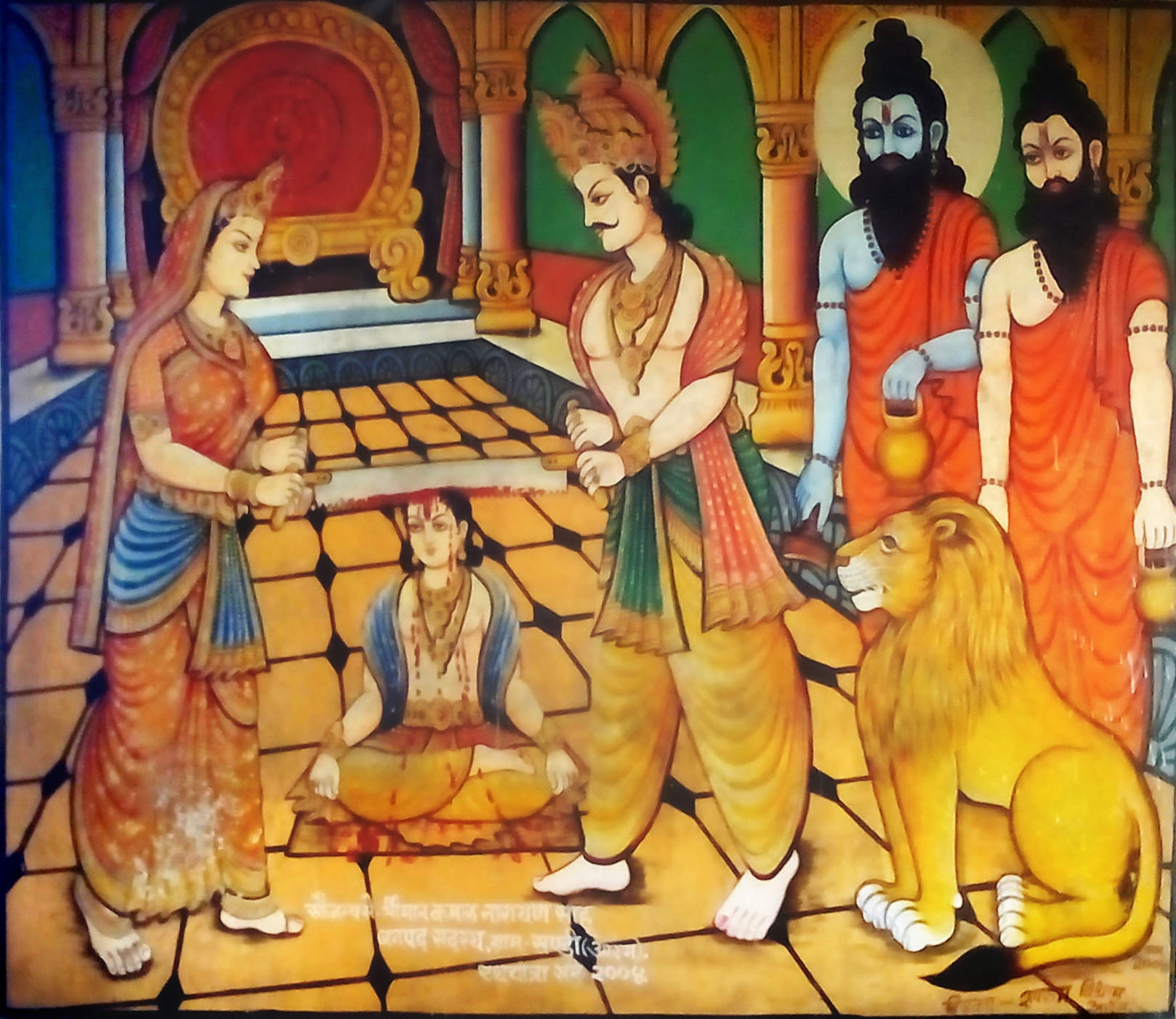
Raja Muraddhawaja (Muratdhawaja) and his wife cutting their son's body (Anga) by a saw (Ara). in the front of saints Shri Krishna and Balram, Arjun as Lion.

Economic activity in the town is mostly related to small scale industries of rice and pulse mills, and many types of forest products. Religious tourism is receiving attention.

== History ==
The name Arang is formed of two words "ara" meaning "saw" and "anga" meaning "body". According to a legend, god Krishna appeared disguised as a Brahmin before King Murddhawaja (Mordhwaj) of the Haihaya dynasty. The pious king offered him whatever dakshina he wanted. The disguised Brahmin asked for one half of the king's body. The king immediately ordered that he be sawed off, and one half given as dakshina. As he was about to be cut in half, a tear drop fell from one of the eyes. The Brahmin asked the king if the tear drop reflected his regret in accepting his request. The king replied no, adding that the half of the body which he did not ask for weeps as it too would like to be a part of the dakshina. Krishna then revealed himself and blessed the king for his devotion.

Arang was ruled in ancient times by the Haihayas Rajput dynasty. Archaeological finds establishes that the town had an ancient history as the centre of Hindu and Jain religious faiths. Arang also finds mention in the Hindu epic Mahabharata.

An archaeological antiquary in the form a copper plate inscription dated to the Gupta period, known as the Arang Plate of Bhimasena II of the clan of Rajarsitulya was unearthed at Arang. It attests to the reign of this dynasty over Chhattisgarh, particularly of Bhimasena II and five rulers who preceded him. It is inferred that they were vassals of the Gupta Empire.

Archaeological finds in Arang also included few Jain images made of gem stones, which are now preserved in the Digambar Jain temple at Raipur.

Another historical legend attributed to Arang in particular, and Chhattisgarh in general, relates to the princess Chandini and her lover Lorik. This legend is in the form of folk-poetry which is widely sung in the state. A memorial statue in their honour exists near Arang.

== Geography and climate ==
Arang, a prosperous ancient town, known for its many Jain and Hindu temples, is located on the west bank of the Mahanadi River, a Nagar Palika in Raipur District in Chhattisgarh, at 21.2°N 81.97°E. It has an average elevation of 267 metres (876 ft). It is 36 kilometres (22 mi) from Raipur on National Highway 53 (N.H.53), a four lane expressway to Durg passing through Arang. It is 15 kilometres (9.3 mi) from Mahasamund city. There is also a four lane road from Arang to Tumgaon. The nearest airport is the Raipur Airport situated near Mana Camp, which is 23.8 kilometres (14.8 mi) away from Arang. Arang Is located beside National Highway 53 that connects Kolkata to Mumbai.

=== Climate ===
According to the Köppen-Geiger classification, Arang has a Temperate or subtropical hot-summer climate with nomenclature as Cwa. The average annual rainfall is 589 millimetres (23.2 in) with July and August recording the maximum. The average temperature is 22.2 °C (72.0 °F) with a maximum of 40.9 °C (105.6 °F) and a minimum of 3 °C (37 °F). June is the hottest month of the year with average temperature of 33.1 °C (91.6 °F) and January recording the lowest.

Climate data for Arang
Month	Jan	Feb	Mar	Apr	May	Jun	Jul	Aug	Sep	Oct	Nov	Dec	Year
Record high °C (°F)	18.0 (64.4)	19.4 (66.9)	24.5 (76.1)	30.2 (86.4)	36.2 (97.2)	40.9 (105.6)	37.5 (99.5)	35.3 (95.5)	34.7 (94.5)	31.6 (88.9)	25.6 (78.1)	19.9 (67.8)	40.9 (105.6)
Daily mean °C (°F)	10.5 (50.9)	12.6 (54.7)	17.6 (63.7)	22.8 (73.0)	28.2 (82.8)	33.1 (91.6)	31.6 (88.9)	30.0 (86.0)	28.4 (83.1)	23.4 (74.1)	17.0 (62.6)	11.8 (53.2)	22.3 (72.1)
Record low °C (°F)	3.0 (37.4)	5.9 (42.6)	10.7 (51.3)	15.5 (59.9)	20.3 (68.5)	25.3 (77.5)	25.7 (78.3)	24.7 (76.5)	22.5 (72.5)	15.3 (59.5)	8.5 (47.3)	3.8 (38.8)	3.0 (37.4)
Average precipitation mm (inches)	48 (1.9)	49 (1.9)	57 (2.2)	40 (1.6)	22 (0.9)	25 (1.0)	107 (4.2)	136 (5.4)	58 (2.3)	12 (0.5)	9 (0.4)	26 (1.0)	589 (23.3)
Source: Climate: Arang

== Demographics ==
As of 2001 India census, Arang had a population of 16,593. Males constituted 51% of the population and females 49%. Arang had an average literacy rate of 64%, higher than the national average of 59.5%; with 60% of the males and 40% of females literate. 16% of the population is under 6 years of age. As of 2011, the population reported was 19,091, an increase of 1.3% over the 2001 figure, which gives a density figure of 812.7/km^{2} over the Nagar Panchayat area of 23.49 square kilometres (9.07 sq mi).

== Economy ==
Economic activity is in the form of small scale industries of rice and pulses mills. It is a commercial town where various types of forest products are marketed in Earlier Days.

Arang is one of the three locations chosen for community development in its Chandkhuri development block.

== Temples ==
Arang has many Jain and Hindu temples that are dated to the 11th and 12th centuries. Archaeological excavations carried out in the town has confirmed the town's ancient history as a Hindu and Jain religious centre, which prospered under the rule of Hindu kings.

The ancient temples in Arang, which are tourist attractions are: the Mand deval temple, the Mahamaya temple, the Danteshwari temple, the Chandi Maheshwari temple, the Panchmukhi Mahadev temple, and the Panchmukhi Hanuman temple. Of these, the Mand Dewal temple and Bagh Deval temple are particularly ancient and well-known.

=== Bhand Dewal temple ===
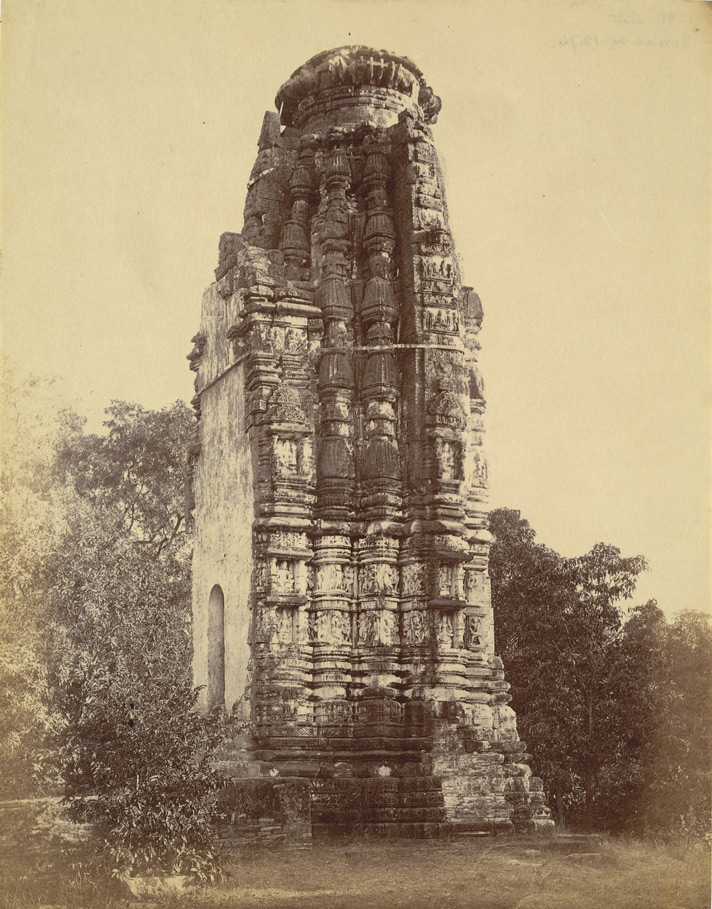
Ruins of the Mand Dewal

Bhand Dewal temple, a Jain temple dated to the late eleventh century, is in the Mahakosala area of Arang. It is built in the Bhumija style of architecture. The plinth of this temple has detailed ornamentation. It has a socle plinth that supports a pedestal, and two rows of sculptures on the wall. The temple layout plan is in a star shape known as stellate (meaning: shaped like a star, having points, or rays radiating from a center) with six "offsets". The temple rises to five floors, which is considered an unusual feature.

The temple faces west and is in rundown condition. In the past, a mandapa (an outdoor pavilion) and a porch probably existed as part of the temple. The temple has three free standing large images of Jain tirthankaras deified in the garbha griha or sanctum sanctorum. These are carved ornately in black stone and highly polished. The three tirthankaras are Ajitanatha, Neminath and Shreyanasanatha. The central figure is adorned with the symbol of a wheel holding two deer in the left hand, and a globe on the right hand. The base of this image has a "winged figure" carving. Carved images also embellish the exterior faces of the temple.

=== Bhand Deval temple ===
Bhand Deval temple, which was inferred initially as a Jain temple, is dated to the 11th century. It has similar architectural features as the Khajuraho temple.

== See also ==
- Champaran (Chhattisgarh), held sacred as the birthplace of Saint Vallabhacharya is nearby.

== Bibliography ==
- Garg, Gaṅgā Rām (1992). Encyclopaedia of the Hindu World. Concept Publishing Company. ISBN 978-81-7022-376-4.
- Jain, Kailash Chand (1972). Malwa Through the Ages, from the Earliest Times to 1305 A.D. Motilal Banarsidass. ISBN 978-81-208-0824-9.
- Kumar, Brajesh (2003). Pilgrimage Centres of India. Diamond Pocket Books (P) Ltd. ISBN 978-81-7182-185-3.
- Misra, Om Prakash (2003). Archaeological Excavations in Central India: Madhya Pradesh and Chhattisgarh. Mittal Publications. ISBN 978-81-7099-874-7.
- Pradesh, India (Republic). Superintendent of Census Operations, Madhya (1964). District Census Handbook, Madhya Pradesh, Census of India, 1961. Government of Madhya Pradesh.
- Provinces, Central (1909). Raipur district. Printed at the Pioneer Press.
- Surjan, Lalit; Verma, Vinod (1996). Reference Deśabandhu Madhya Pradesh. Deshbandhu Publication Division. ISBN 9788190073318.
