= Darpahn, Hormozgan =

Village in Hormozgan province, Iran

Darpahn Persian: درپهن
- Village
- Location within Iran
- Coordinates: 26°38′42″N 57°33′56″E
- Country: Iran
- Province: Hormozgan
- County: Minab
- District: Senderk
- Rural District: Darpahn

Population (2016)
  - Total: 978
- Time zone: UTC+3:30 (IRST)

Darpahn (Persian: درپهن) (Note: Also known as Dar Pahn and Darreh Pahn) is a village in, and the capital of, Darpahn Rural District of Senderk District, Minab County, Hormozgan province, Iran.

== Demographics ==
=== Population ===
At the time of the 2006 National Census, the village's population was 781 in 152 households. The following census in 2011 counted 1,323 people in 274 households. The 2016 census measured the population of the village as 978 people in 237 households.
