= Arang Jain temples =

Arang Jain temple
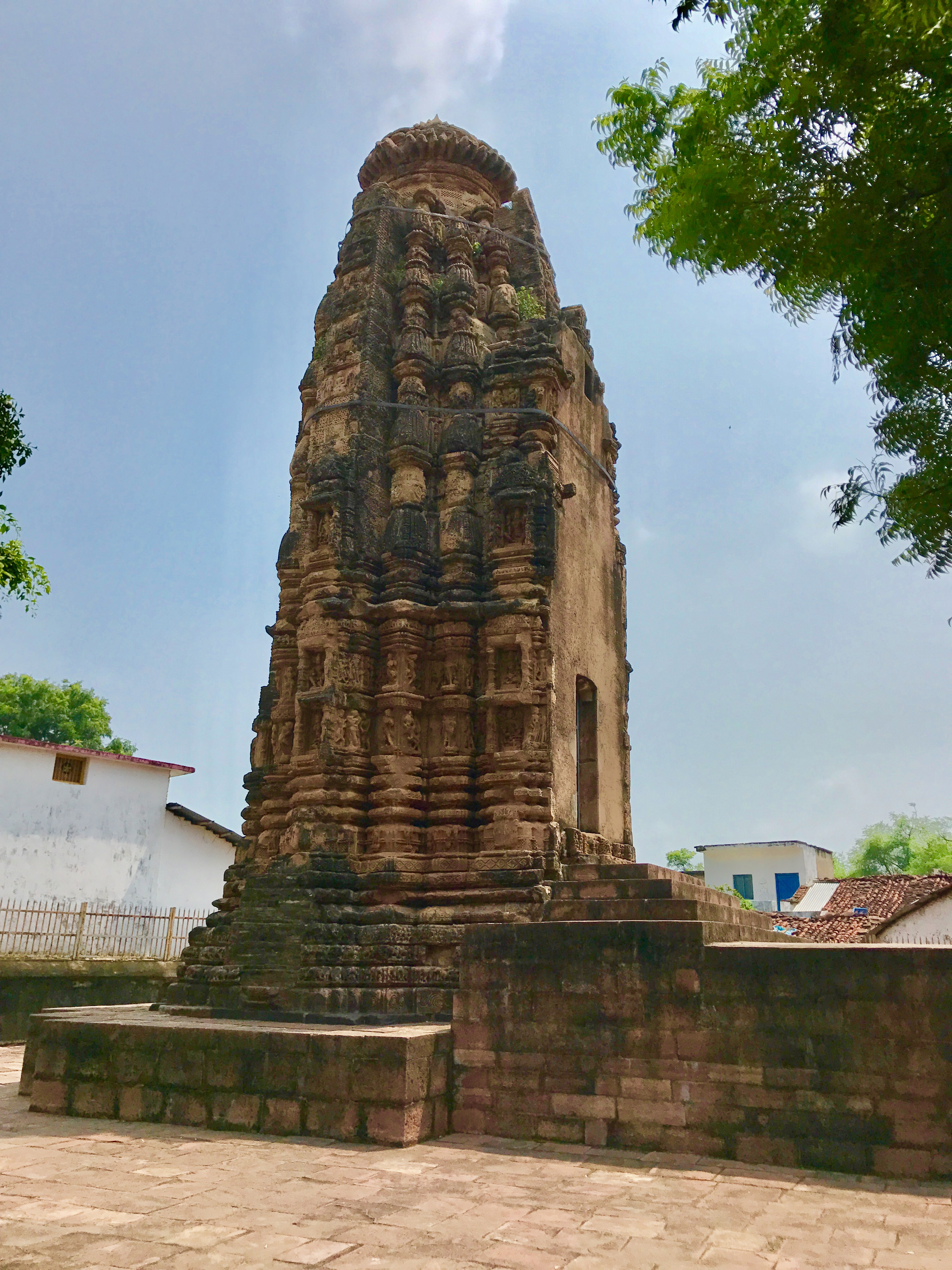
- Bhand Dewal temple

Religion
- Affiliation: Jainism
- Deity: Neminatha
- Festival: Mahavir Jayanti

Location
- Location: Arang, Chhattisgarh
- Interactive map of Arang Jain temple
- Coordinates: 21°11′42.17″N 81°58′9.87″E

Architecture
- Established: 9th century
- Temple: 3

Arang Jain temples is group of three Jain temples in Arang, Raipur, Chhattisgarh, India. These temples dates back to the 9th and 11th centuries.

== History ==
Arang was ruled in ancient times by the Haihayas Rajput dynasty. Archaeological finds establishes that the town had an ancient history as the centre of Hindu and Jain religious faiths. Arang also finds mention in the Hindu epic Mahabharata.

Arang has many Jain and Hindu temples that date backs to the 9th to 11th centuries. Archaeological excavations carried out in the town has confirmed the town's ancient history as a Hindu and Jain religious centre, which prospered under the rule of Hindu kings.

The ancient temples in Arang, which are tourist attractions are the Baghdeval temple, the Bhanda Dewal temple, the Mahamaya temple, the Danteshwari temple, the Chandi Maheshwari temple, the Panchmukhi Mahadev temple, and the Panchmukhi Hanuman temple. Of these, the Bhand Dewal temple and Bagh Deval temple are particularly ancient and well-known. In May 2017 an idol of Adinath (Rishabhanatha) was excavated near this temple. This idol is 1.16 metres (3 ft 10 in) in height, 37 centimetres (15 in) in width and 21 centimetres (8.3 in) in thickness. This standing sculpture has a Yaksha and Yakshini near its knee region on two sides. The sculpture is dated to 5th-6th centuries AD.

== Temples ==
=== Bhand Dewal temple ===
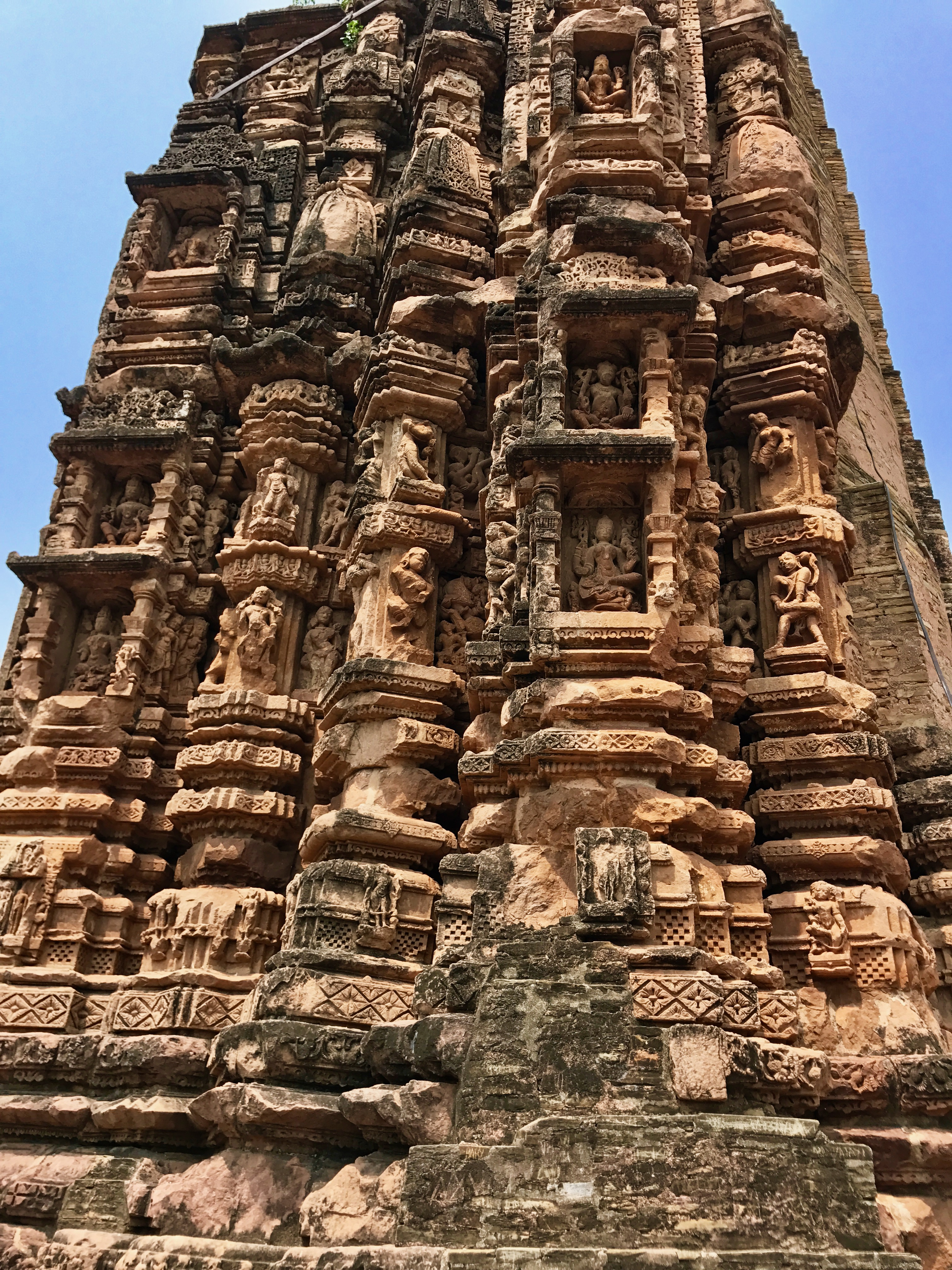
Detailed carvings on the wall

Bhand Dewal temple, a Jain temple dated to the late eleventh century, is in the Mahakosala area of Arang. The temple is built in Bhumija architecture. The plinth of this temple has detailed ornamentation. It has a socle that supports a pedestal and two rows of sculptures on the wall. The temple layout plan is in a star shape known as stellate (meaning: shaped like a star, having points, or rays radiating from a centre) with six "offsets". The temple rises to five floors, which is considered an unusual feature.

The temple faces west and is in a rundown condition. In the past, a mandapa (an outdoor pavilion) and a porch probably existed as part of the temple. The damaged front fascia of the temple tower has been plastered without any decoration and also whitewashed. The north-east and south-east faces of the temple tower, which were also dilapidated, have been redone in brick and mortar, but crudely. However, the overall view of the tower is still pleasing. At some stage, this temple was used as a survey marking station. As there was a tendency for the upper half of the tower to structurally burst by its seams, a metal strap bracing has been wound around the tower at the middle section to give it stability. A similar strap has been wound round at the top of the tower. A large number of images are carved on the exterior and interior faces of the temple. The bigger images are carved in two lines. Above the lines of bigger images, a row of carvings of smaller images has been sculpted. At the base of the larger images is a row of a highly decorated depiction of inscription panels, flowers, and a royal march of horses, animals, and people. The exterior faces of the temple have been embellished with carved images.

The temple has three free-standing large images of Jain tirthankaras deified in the garbha griha or sanctum sanctorum. These are carved ornately in black stone and highly polished. The three Tirthankaras are Ajitanatha, Neminath and Shreyanasanatha. The central figure is adorned with the symbol of a wheel holding two deer in the left hand, and a globe on the right hand. The base of this image has a "winged figure" carving. Carved images also embellish the exterior faces of the temple.

=== Bagh Deval temple ===
Bagh Deval temple, which was inferred initially as a Jain temple, is dated to the 11th century. It has similar architectural features as the Khajuraho temple.

=== Mahamaya temple ===
Mahamaya temple also has three colossal images of Tirthankaras. There is also a large single stone sculpture with illustrations of all 24 Tirthankaras carved on it.

== Gallery ==
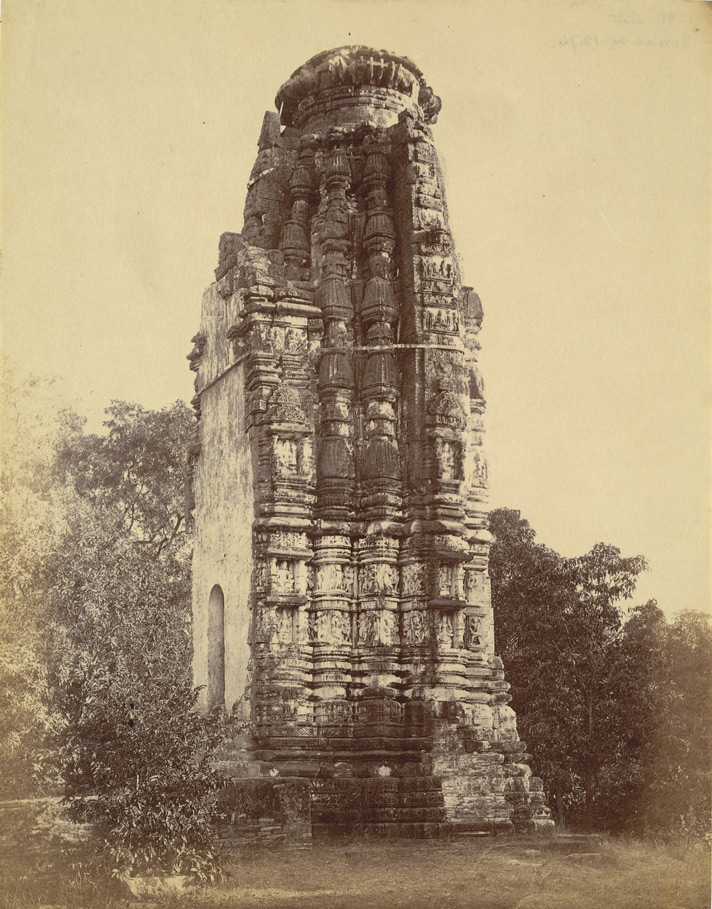
Bhand Dewal in 1873

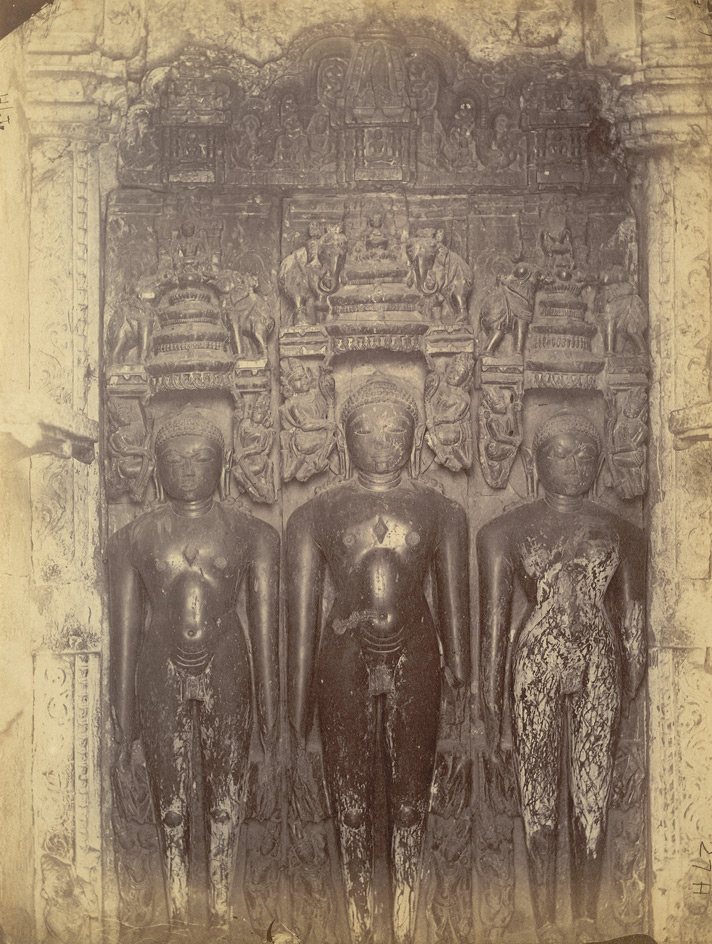
Sculptures of Ajitanatha, Neminath and Shreyanasanatha inside Bhand Dewal

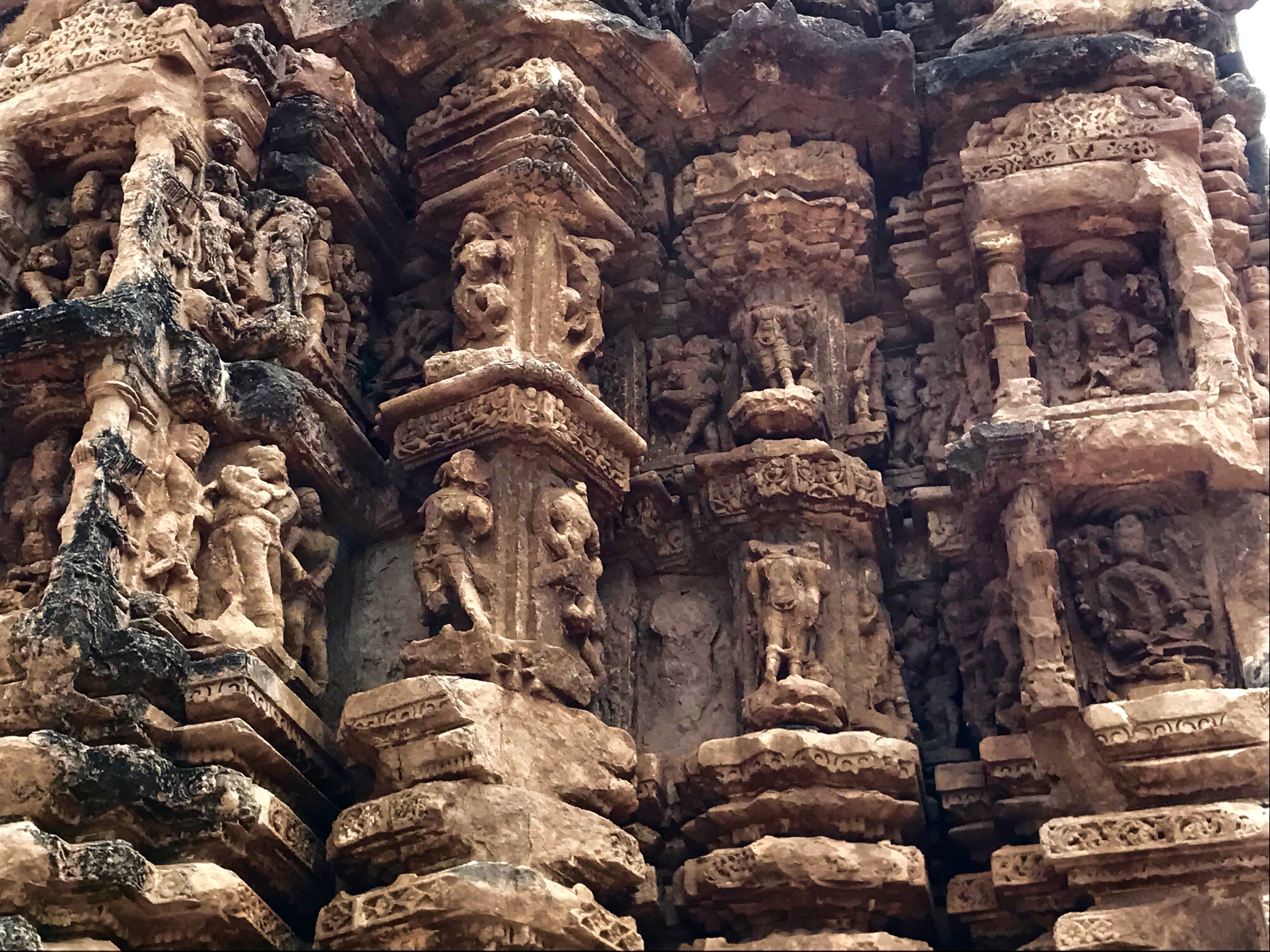
Carvings on the wall, Bhand Deul

== Current status ==
It is a protected monument under the Raipur circle of Archaeological Survey of India, since 1920.

== See also ==
- Haihaiyavansi Kingdom
