= Sarnath Jain Tirth =

Jain temple in the state of Uttar Pradesh

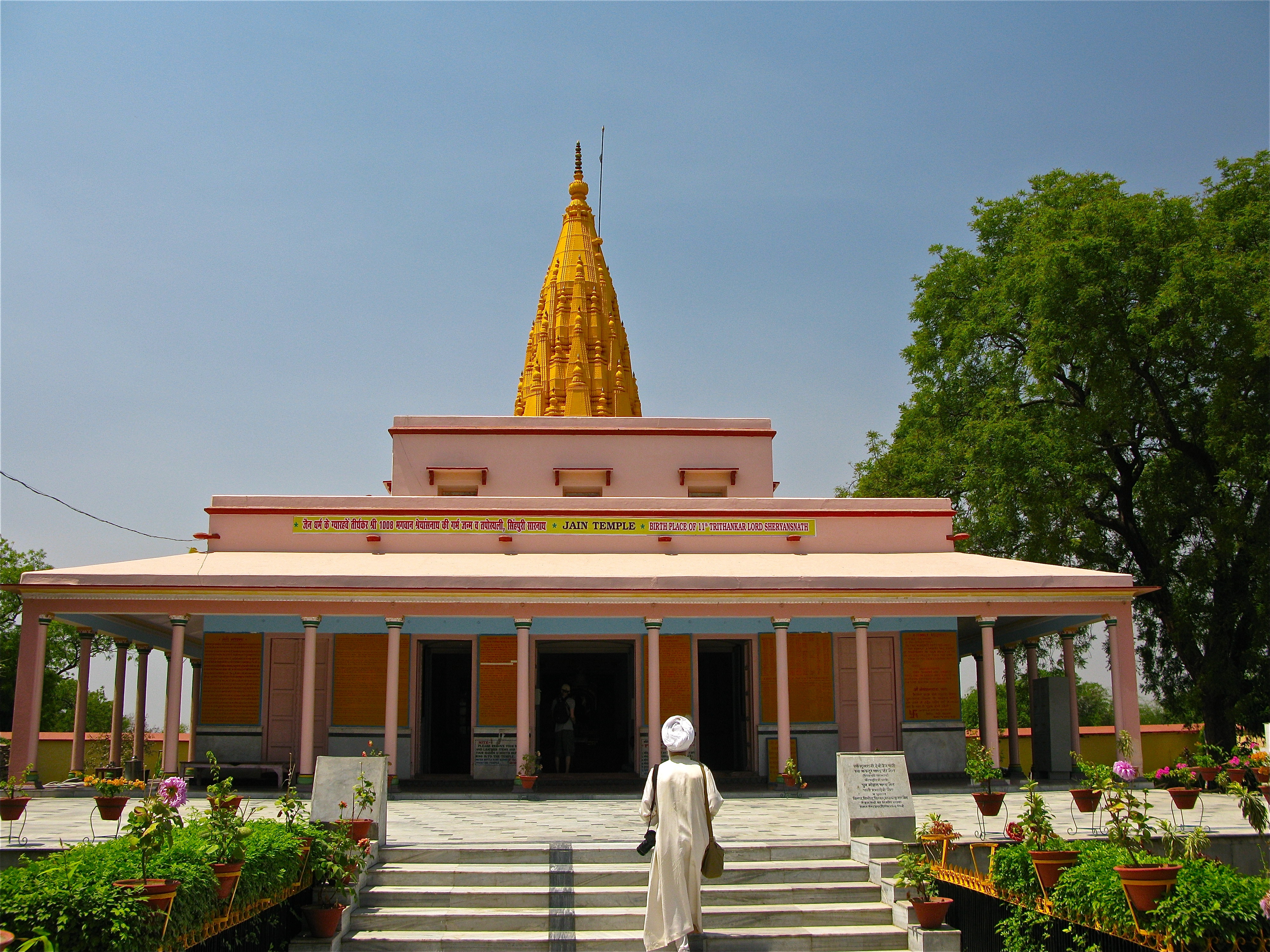
- Shri Singhpuri Jain Tirth

Religion
- Affiliation: Jainism
- Sect: Śvetāmbara and Digambara
- Deity: Shreyansanatha
- Festival: Mahavir Jayanti

Location
- Location: Sarnath, Uttar Pradesh
- Interactive map of Sarnath Jain Tirth
- Coordinates: 25°22′50″N 83°01′26″E

Specifications
- Temple: 1
- Monument: 1 ruined temple

Sarnath Jain Tirth, also called the Shreyanshnath Jain Pilgrimage, is a group of Jain temples in Sarnath. They are located near Dhamek Stupa. The principal surviving temple is a Digambara temple dedicated to Shreyansanatha, the eleventh Tirthankara. The present temple was constructed in 1824, although Jain pilgrimage traditions and textual references indicate a Jain presence at Sarnath considerably earlier.

== History ==
Simhapuri, present-day Singhpuri village, is believed to be the birthplace of the Shreyansanatha, the 11th tirthankara. The place also marks four of five Kalyanaka (auspicious events) of Shreyansanatha: Chyavan (tirthankara enter's their mother's womb), Janm (birth), Diksha (renunciation) and Kevala Jnana (omniscience). The Archaeological Survey of India also identifies Sarnath as sacred to Jains because Shreyansanatha is traditionally associated with attaining asceticism and kevala jnana at the site. Mahavira also delivered sermons at Sarnath and Varanasi.

Jain association with Sarnath predates the construction of the present temple. A Jain pilgrimage text associated with Jinaprabha Suri refers to a Jain religious site in the vicinity of a Buddhist sanctuary called Dharmeksha, identified with the present Dhamek Stupa at Sarnath. This textual reference provides evidence that Sarnath continued to be known within Jain pilgrimage geography during the medieval period, long before construction of the present Digambara temple.

The ruins near a relatively new Digambara temple are of an ancient Jain temple erected by the Śvetāmbaras. The French traveller Louis Rousselet, who visited India in the 19th century, recorded the remains of the earlier Jain establishment near the modern temple.

== About Digambara temple ==
The temple was constructed in 1824 CE to commemorate the birthplace of Shreyansanatha. The construction date is independently recorded in modern documentation of the Sarnath archaeological landscape; the ICOMOS evaluation of Sarnath notes that a Jain temple was built near the Dhamek Stupa in 1824. The temple stands immediately southwest of the Dhamek Stupa, within the wider historic landscape of Sarnath.

The mulnayak (primary deity) of the temple is a large image of Shreyansanatha and impressions of footprints. The temple also features attractive frescoes depicting the life of Mahavira. The present structure is also known as the Shri Digambar Jain Temple and Shreyanshnath Temple.

== Jain association with Sarnath ==
Sarnath occupies an unusual position in the religious geography of Jainism and Buddhism. The Jain pilgrimage centre lies immediately beside the Buddhist archaeological remains dominated by the Dhamek Stupa. A medieval Jain source refers to the Buddhist establishment at Sarnath by the name Dharmeksha. The reference occurs in the context of Jain pilgrimage geography and demonstrates that the Buddhist ruins were used as a geographical landmark for identifying the nearby Jain sacred site. 'The modern Jain temple continues this association between the two religious landscapes, standing approximately 70 metres (230 ft) southwest of the Dhamek Stupa.

== Shreyansanatha ==
According to Jain tradition, Shreyansanatha was born at Simhapuri, identified with Singhpur near Sarnath. He is the eleventh of the twenty-four Tirthankaras of the present cycle. Sarnath is associated with four of his five kalyanakas—conception, birth, renunciation and attainment of omniscience—while his liberation is traditionally associated with Shikharji. The association with Shreyansanatha accounts for the alternative name Shreyanshnath Jain Temple for the present Digambara shrine.

== Gallery ==
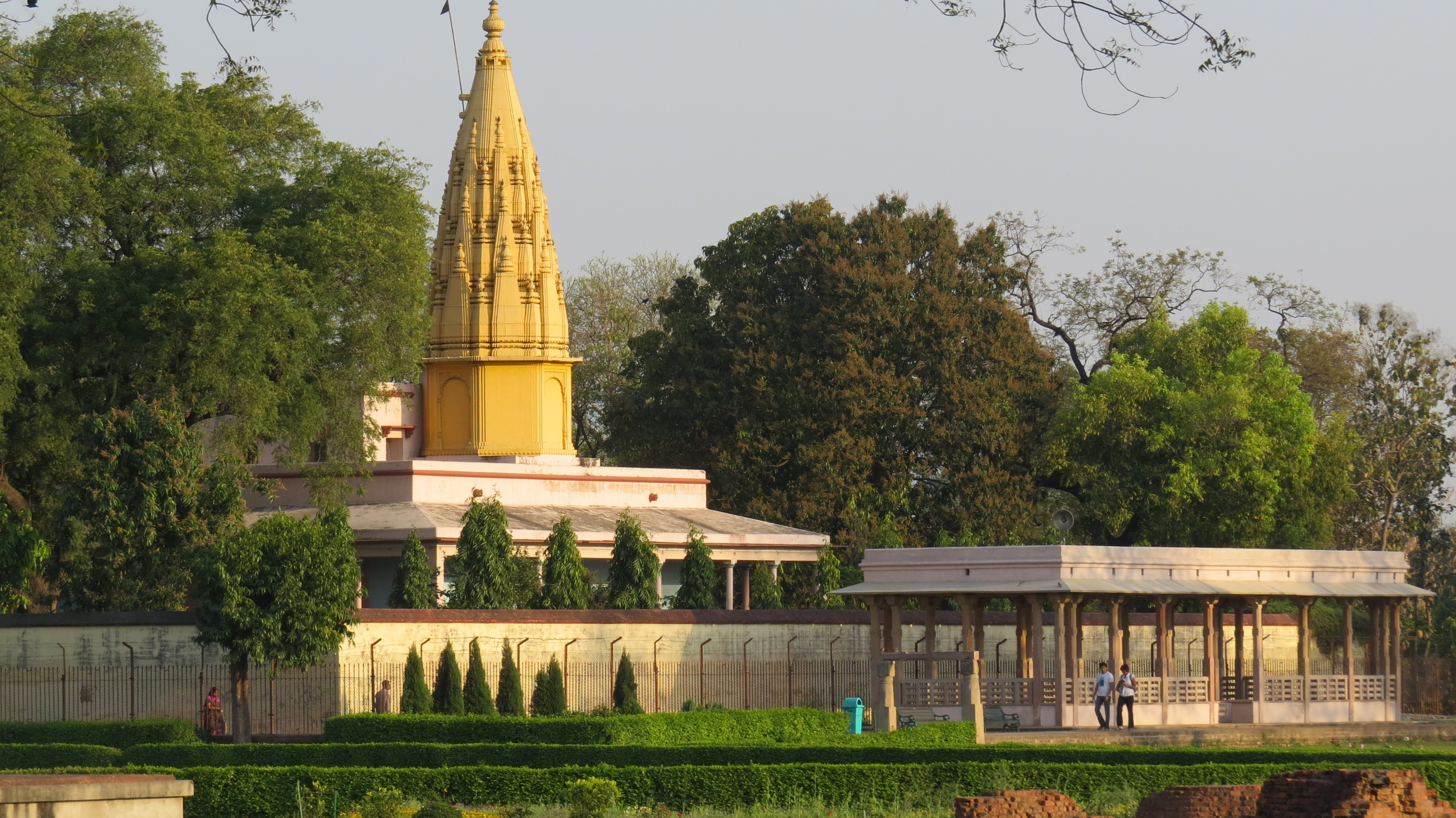
Digambar temple and Śvetāmbara temple ruins

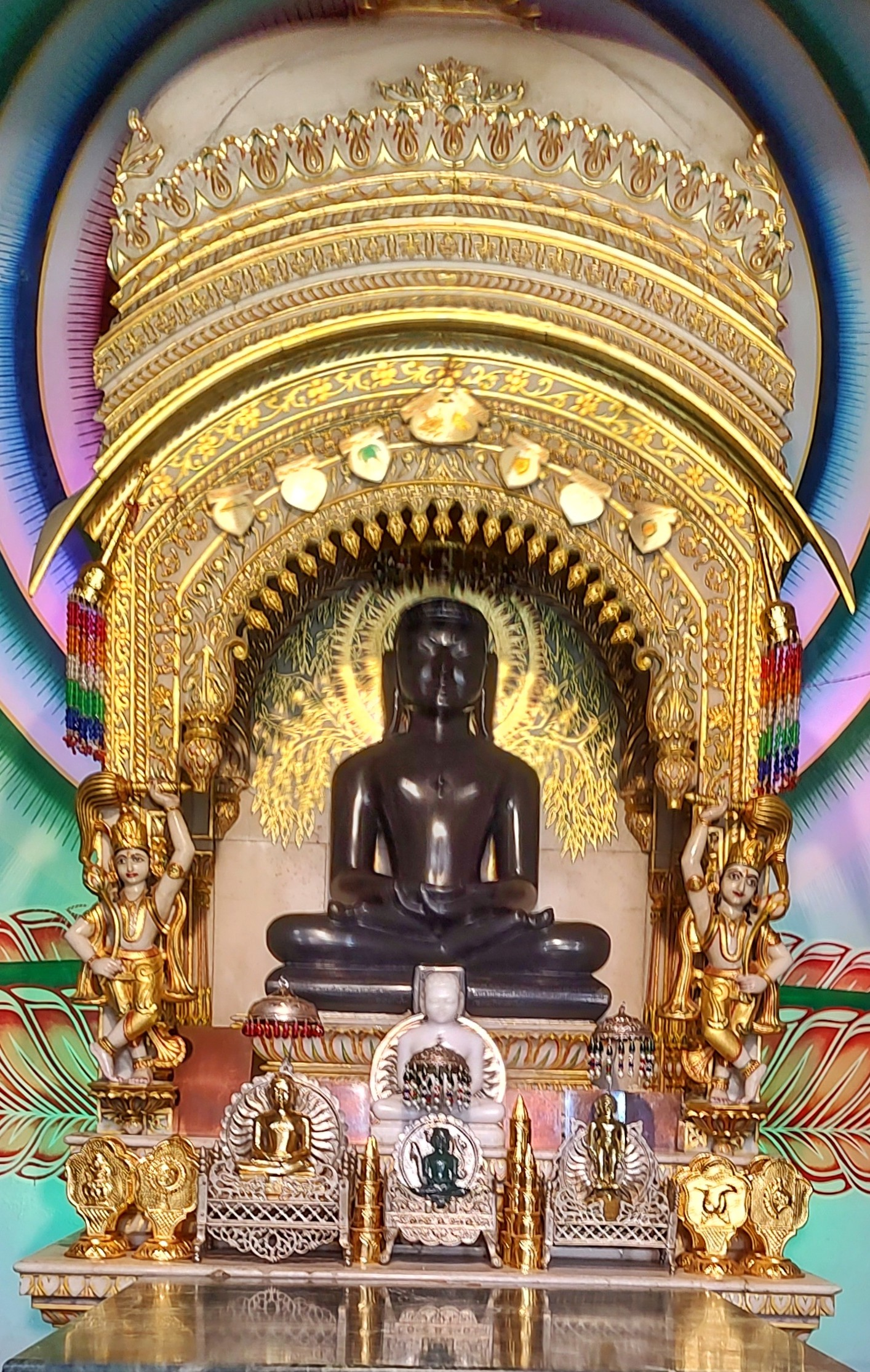
Idol of Shreyansanatha

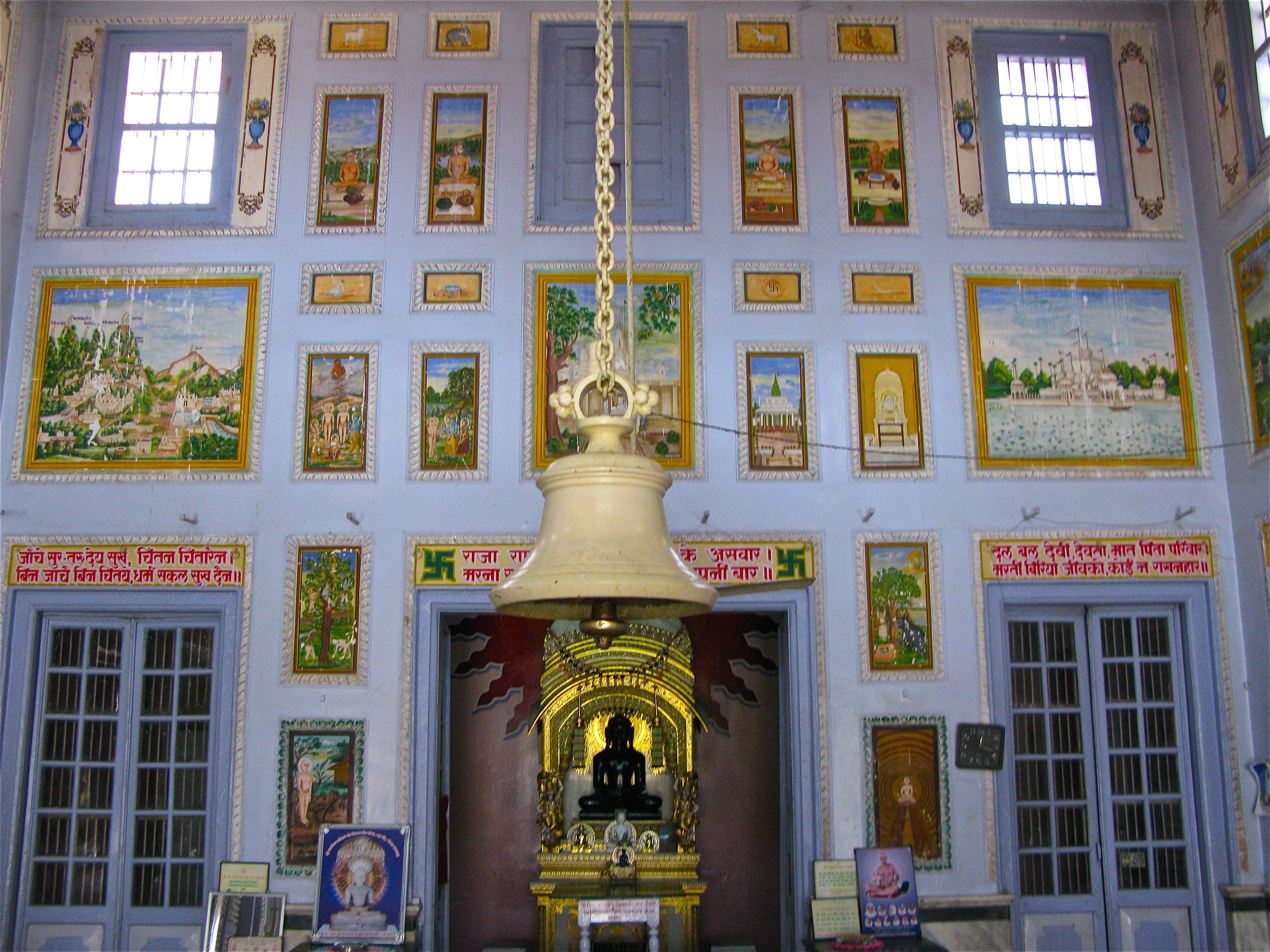
Frescoes inside temple

== See also ==
- Parshvanath Jain temple, Varanasi
- Chandrawati Jain temple
