= Dar Pahn, Kerman =

Dar Pahn درپهن
- Village
- Location within Iran
- Coordinates: 29°09′16″N 56°41′44″E
- Country: Iran
- Province: Kerman
- County: Baft
- Bakhsh: Central
- Rural District: Bezenjan

Population (2006)
  - Total: 48
- Time zone: UTC+3:30 (IRST)
  - Summer (DST): UTC+4:30 (IRDT)

Dar Pahn (Persian: درپهن, also Romanized as Dar-e Pahn) is a village in Bezenjan Rural District, in the Central District of Baft County, Kerman Province, Iran. At the 2006 census, its population was 48, in 12 families.
