= Shreyansanatha =

11th Tirthankara in Jainism

- 11th Jain Tirthankara
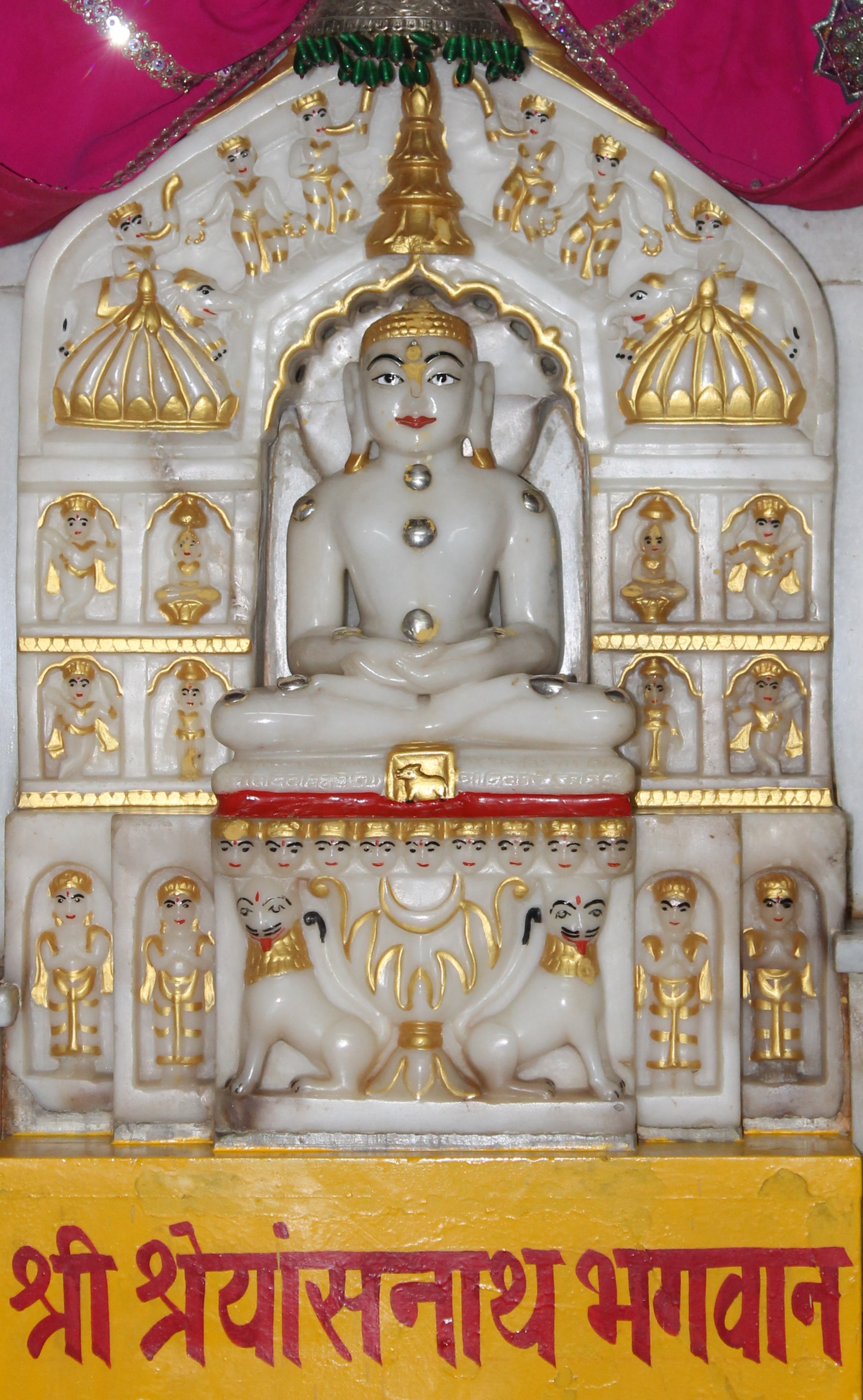
- Shri Shreyansnath Bhagwan at Shri Sinhapuri Tirth, Sarnath, UP.
- Venerated in: Jainism
- Predecessor: Shitalanatha
- Successor: Vasupujya
- Symbol: Rhinoceros
- Height: 80 bows (240 meters)
- Age: 8,400,000 years
- Color: Golden

Genealogy
- Born: Sarnath
- Died: Shikharji
- Parents: Vishnu (father); Vishna (mother)
- Dynasty: Ikṣvākuvaṁśa

Shreyansanath was the eleventh Jain Tirthankara of the present age (Avasarpini). According to Jain beliefs, he became a Siddha – a liberated soul which has destroyed all of its karma. Shreyansanatha was born to King Vishnu and Queen Vishna at Simhapuri, near Sarnath in the Ikshvaku dynasty. His birth date was the twelfth day of the Falgun Krishna month of the Indian calendar.

== Life and legends ==
According to Jain tradition, Shreyansanatha is venerated as the 11th tirthankara of the present cosmic age (avasarpini). Jain universal history states that he was born into the ancient Ikshvaku dynasty to King Vishnu and Queen Vishna in the city of Simhapuri, located near modern-day Sarnath in Uttar Pradesh. Within the expansive framework of Jain cosmology, texts attribute to him a symbolic lifespan of 8,400,000 years and a towering physical height of 80 bows (dhanushas). After ruling his kingdom, traditional narratives describe him renouncing worldly attachments to become an ascetic, eventually attaining omniscience (Kevala Jnana). Following a long period of preaching the doctrines of nonviolence and karmic shedding (nirjara), he ultimately achieved liberation from the cycle of rebirth (moksha) on the sacred peaks of Mount Shikharji in modern-day Jharkhand.

His birth date was the 12th day of the Falgun Krishna month of the Indian calendar. Shreyansanatha is said to have been born 9,999,900 sagara after his predecessor, Shitalanatha. His successor, Vasupujya, is said to have been born 54 sagara after him.

== Teachings on Nirjara ==
Shreyansnath's teachings emphasized Nirjara, the discharge of karmas. He explained that karmas are in stages of charging and discharging, with Nirjara being the stage of discharge. He distinguished between Akaam Nirjara (discharge without purpose) and Sakaam Nirjara (discharge with purpose). For a self-realized person, Sakaam Nirjara ensures that no new karmas are charged, as they remain vigilant in their awareness of being a Knower and Seer. Shreyansnath also highlighted the importance of penance (tapa) in achieving Sakaam Nirjara. He categorized penance into two types: Bahya Tapa (external penance) and Abhyantar Tapa (internal penance).

=== Bahya Tapa ===
The six types of Bahya Tapa are:

1. Anshan (fasting)
2. Unodari (eating less)
3. Vrutti Sankshep (limiting desires)
4. Ras Tyag (abstaining from taste)
5. Kayotsarg (meditation)
6. Sanlinta (modesty)

=== Abhyantar Tapa ===
The six types of Abhyantar Tapa are:

1. Prayashchit (repentance)
2. Vaiyavach (service to saints)
3. Swadhyay (study of the self)
4. Vinay (humility)
5. Vyutsarg (renunciation)
6. Dhyan (meditation)

Through Abhyantar Tapa, true karmic shedding occurs. Practices like Prayashchit help cleanse sins, while maintaining equanimity and viewing others as innocent aids in achieving liberation.

== Iconography ==
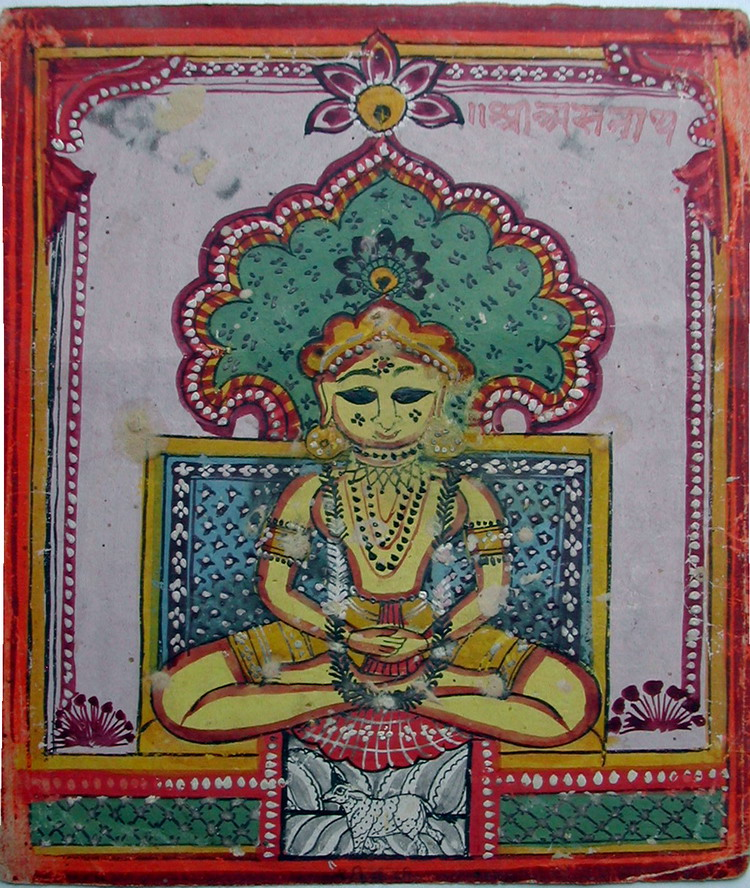
Gouche and Silver on paper painting, Gujarat, 18th century

In Jain art and sculpture, Shreyansanatha is traditionally depicted in a meditative posture and is distinctly identified by his golden physical complexion. He is explicitly recognized by his unique iconographic emblem, the rhinoceros, which is typically carved or stamped onto the pedestal beneath his idols. As with all tirthankaras, he is depicted alongside his dedicated guardian deities (Shashan-devatas). According to both the Digambara and Śvētāmbara traditions, his accompanying male guardian deity (yaksha) is Ishvara. However, sectarian traditions differ regarding his female guardian (yakshi), with the Digambara sect identifying her as Gauri and the Śvētāmbara sect identifying her as Manavi.

== Temples and legacy ==
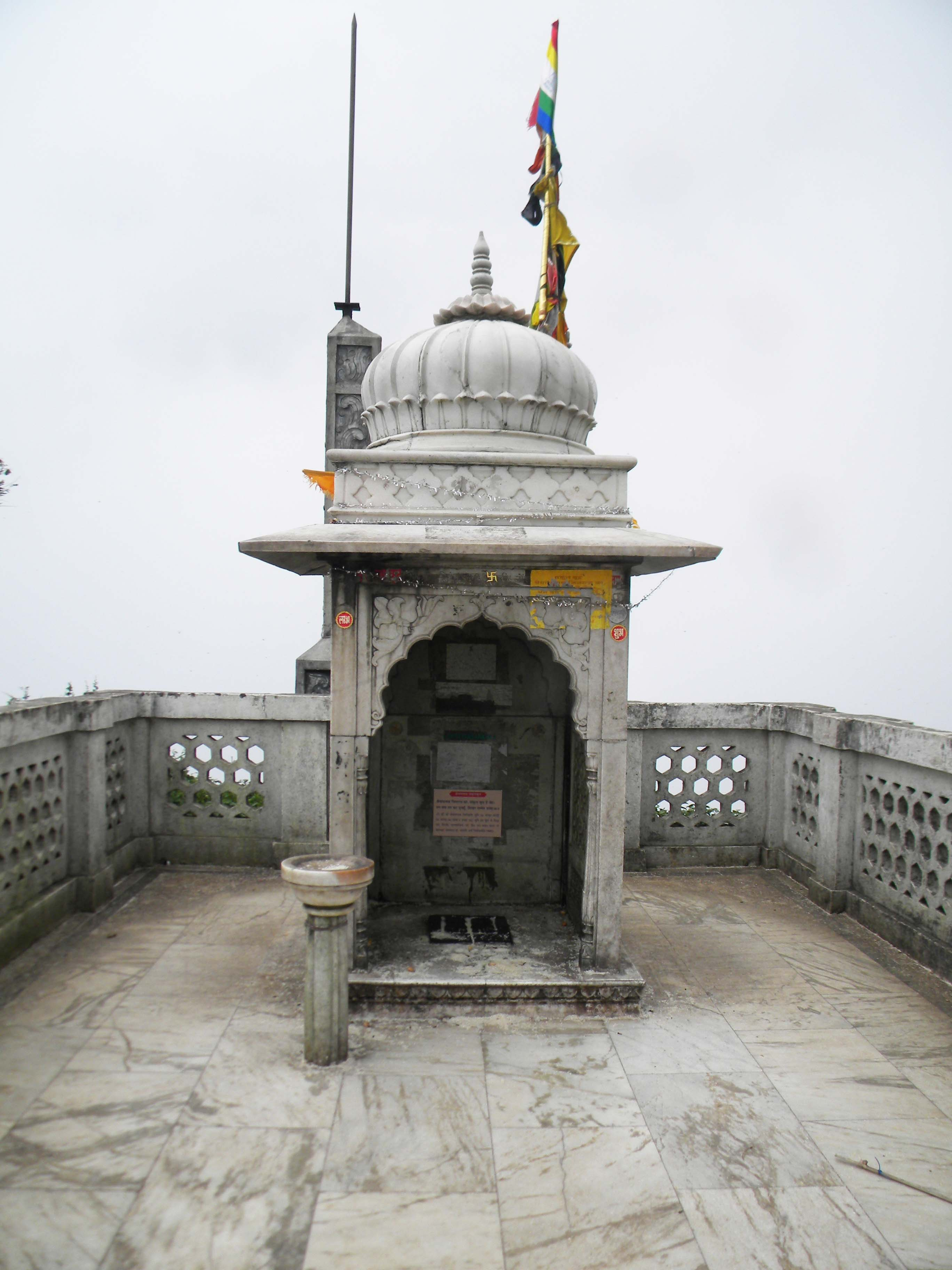
Shreyansanath Tonk, Shikharji

Due to his status as the 11th tirthankara, Shreyansanatha is widely venerated, with several significant historical and modern temple complexes dedicated to his worship.

=== Places of birth and liberation ===
The ancient site of Simhapuri near Sarnath, Varanasi traditionally identified in Jain universal history as his royal birthplace, serves as the primary geographic epicenter of his worship. The Sarnath Jain Tirth in Sarnath is a major pan-Indian pilgrimage destination that commemorates his early life, renunciation, and first sermons. Furthermore, marking the geographic site of his ultimate spiritual liberation, a dedicated shrine (tonk) enshrining his footprints (charan) is actively venerated by pilgrims on the peaks of Mount Shikharji.

=== Other temples ===
A 9th-century idol of Shreyansanatha is housed at the Bhand Dewal temple, depicting him alongside the tirthankaras Neminatha and Ajitnatha. The Simhapuri Jain temple at Sarnath, near Varanasi. Historical regional artwork of Shreyansanatha includes an 18th-century gouache and silver on paper painting from Gujarat.

Shreyansh Giri, Nachna an important archaeological site containing monuments and sculptures dating from the Gupta period in 5th century. Some of the Jain sculptures were found on the hill now known as Siddh-ka-Pahar, identified with present-day Shreyansh Giri. Jain images were installed in caves and rock-cut shelters on the hill.

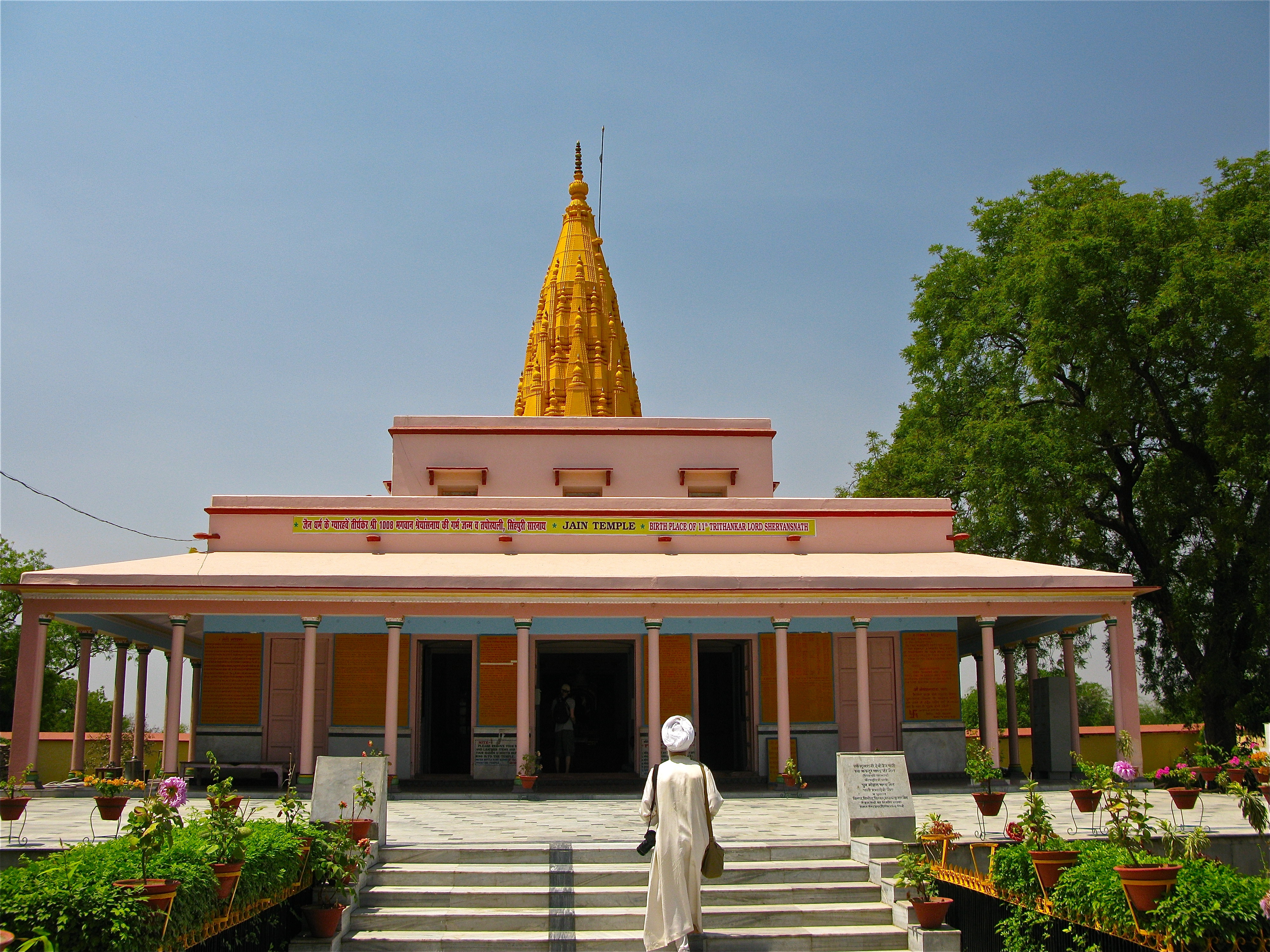
Simhapuri Jain Temple, Sarnath, near Varanasi, the birthplace of Shreyansanath.

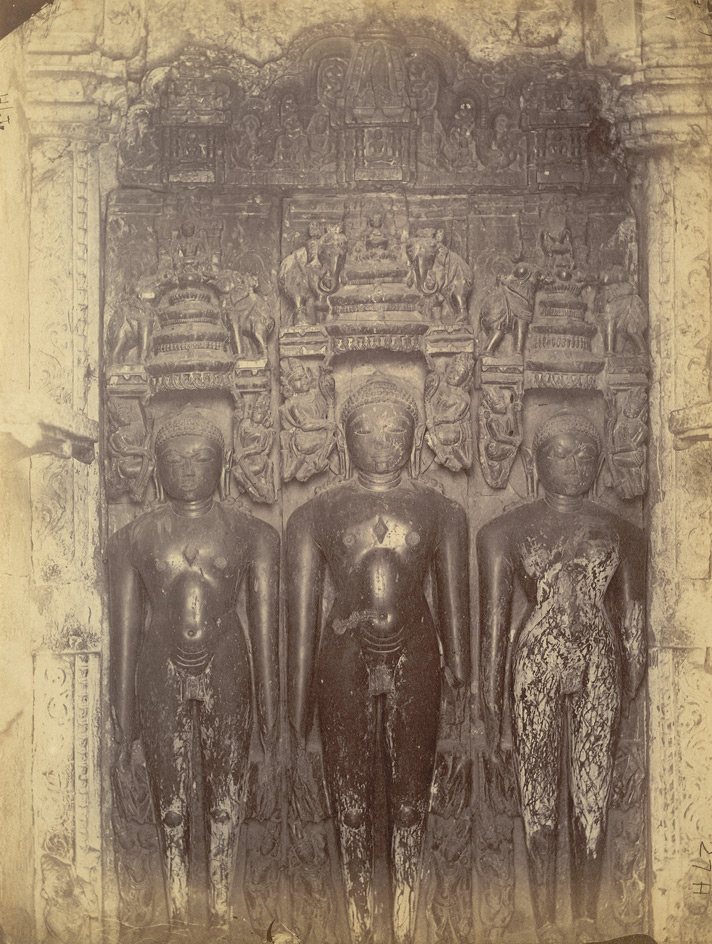
Shreyanasanatha idol in Bhand Dewal along with Neminatha and Ajitnatha dated back to 9th century

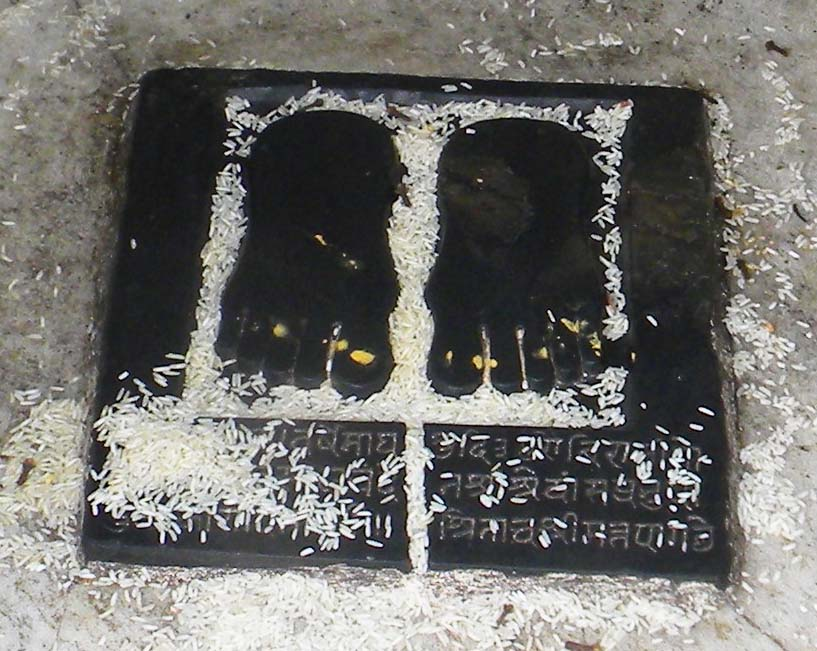
Footprint at Shreyansanath Tonk, Shikharji

== See also ==
- God in Jainism
- Arihant (Jainism)
- Shreyansh Giri
