= Bondar Rural District =

Rural district in Hormozgan province, Iran

Bondar Rural District Persian: دهستان بندر
- Rural District
- Location within Iran
- Coordinates: 26°57′43″N 57°35′43″E
- Country: Iran
- Province: Hormozgan
- County: Minab
- District: Senderk
- Capital: Bondar

Population (2016)
  - Total: 3,730
- Time zone: UTC+3:30 (IRST)

Bondar Rural District (Persian: دهستان بندر) is in Senderk District of Minab County, Hormozgan province, Iran. Its capital is the village of Bondar.

== Demographics ==
=== Population ===
At the time of the 2006 National Census, the rural district's population was 3,512 in 787 households. There were 4,038 inhabitants in 969 households at the following census of 2011. The 2016 census measured the population of the rural district as 3,730 in 1,035 households. The most populous of its 46 villages was Bondar, with 492 people.
