= Darpahn Rural District =

Rural district in Hormozgan province, Iran

Darpahn Rural District Persian: دهستان درپهن
- Rural District
- Location within Iran
- Coordinates: 26°37′18″N 57°29′58″E
- Country: Iran
- Province: Hormozgan
- County: Minab
- District: Senderk
- Capital: Darpahn

Population (2016)
  - Total: 7,537
- Time zone: UTC+3:30 (IRST)

Darpahn Rural District (Persian: دهستان درپهن) is in Senderk District of Minab County, Hormozgan province, Iran. Its capital is the village of Darpahn.

== Demographics ==
=== Population ===
At the time of the 2006 National Census, the rural district's population was 6,118 in 1,309 households. There were 7,832 inhabitants in 1,797 households at the following census of 2011. The 2016 census measured the population of the rural district as 7,537 in 1,881 households. The most populous of its 54 villages was Darjadun, with 982 people.
