= Senderk Rural District =

Rural district in Hormozgan province, Iran

Senderk Rural District Persian: دهستان سندرك
- Rural District
- Location within Iran
- Coordinates: 26°46′45″N 57°28′18″E
- Country: Iran
- Province: Hormozgan
- County: Minab
- District: Senderk
- Capital: Senderk

Population (2016)
  - Total: 8,944
- Time zone: UTC+3:30 (IRST)

Senderk Rural District (Persian: دهستان سندرك) is in Senderk District of Minab County, Hormozgan province, Iran. It is administered from the city of Senderk.

== Demographics ==
=== Population ===
At the time of the 2006 National Census, the rural district's population was 9,871 in 2,095 households. There were 9,730 inhabitants in 2,370 households at the following census of 2011. The 2016 census measured the population of the rural district as 8,944 in 2,386 households. The most populous of its 59 villages was Garu, with 2,336 people.
