= Senderk District =

District in Hormozgan province, Iran

Senderk District Persian: بخش سندرک
- District
- Location within Iran
- Coordinates: 26°45′29″N 57°32′52″E
- Country: Iran
- Province: Hormozgan
- County: Minab
- Capital: Senderk

Population (2016)
  - Total: 22,126
- Time zone: UTC+3:30 (IRST)

Senderk District (Persian: بخش سندرک) is in Minab County, Hormozgan province, Iran. Its capital is the city of Senderk.

== History ==
After the 2006 National Census, the village of Senderk was elevated to the status of a city.

== Demographics ==
=== Population ===
At the time of the 2006 census, the district's population was 19,501 in 4,191 households. The following census in 2011 counted 23,624 people in 5,517 households. The 2016 census measured the population of the district as 22,126 inhabitants in 5,761 households.

=== Administrative divisions ===
Senderk District Population
Administrative Divisions	2006	2011	2016
Bondar RD	3,512	4,038	3,730
Darpahn RD	6,118	7,832	7,537
Senderk RD	9,871	9,730	8,944
Senderk (city)		2,024	1,915
Total	19,501	23,624	22,126
RD = Rural District
