= Ruttan =

Ruttan is a surname. Notable people with the surname include:

- Charles Edwin Ruttan (1884–1939), Canadian-born painter
- Deric Ruttan (born 1972), Canadian country music artist from Bracebridge, Ontario
- Henry Norlande Ruttan (1848–1925), Canadian engineer and Canadian Army Officer
- Henry Ruttan (1792–1871), businessman, inventor and politician figure in Upper Canada
- Jack Ruttan (1889–1973), Canadian amateur ice hockey player and coach
- James Farrand Ruttan (1850–1904), real estate agent and politician in Ontario
- John Paul Ruttan (born 2001), Canadian child actor, played Joe in the film This Means War
- Robert Fulford Ruttan, FRSC (1856–1930), Canadian chemist and university professor
- Susan Ruttan (born 1948), American actress
- Vernon Wesley Ruttan (1924–2008), development economist at the University of Minnesota

== See also ==
- Rutan (disambiguation)
