= Gunamordi =

Village in Hormozgan province, Iran

Gunamordi Persian: گونمردي
- Village
- Location within Iran
- Coordinates: 26°21′49″N 57°13′22″E
- Country: Iran
- Province: Hormozgan
- County: Sirik
- District: Central
- Rural District: Biyaban

Population (2016)
  - Total: 1,461
- Time zone: UTC+3:30 (IRST)

Gunamordi (Persian: گونمردي) (Note: Also romanized as Gownamordī) is a village in, and the capital of, Biyaban Rural District of the Central District of Sirik County, Hormozgan province, Iran.

== Demographics ==
=== Population ===
At the time of the 2006 National Census, the village's population was 1,334 in 220 households, when it was in the former Biyaban District of Minab County. The following census in 2011 counted 1,365 people in 244 households, by which time the district had been separated from the county in the establishment of Sirik County. The 2016 census measured the population of the village as 1,461 people in 305 households. The rural district was transferred to the new Central District.
