= Sarzeh, Sirik =

Village in Hormozgan province, Iran

Sarzeh Persian: سرزه
- Village
- Location within Iran
- Coordinates: 26°26′01″N 57°16′01″E
- Country: Iran
- Province: Hormozgan
- County: Sirik
- District: Central
- Rural District: Biyaban

Population (2016)
  - Total: 1,633
- Time zone: UTC+3:30 (IRST)

Sarzeh (Persian: سرزه) is a village in Biyaban Rural District of the Central District of Sirik County, Hormozgan province, Iran.

== Demographics ==
=== Population ===
At the time of the 2006 National Census, the village's population was 1,348 in 219 households, when it was in the former Biyaban District of Minab County. The following census in 2011 counted 1,644 people in 317 households, by which time the district had been separated from the county in the establishment of Sirik County. The rural district was transferred to the new Central District. The 2016 census measured the population of the village as 1,633 people in 355 households. It was the most populous village in its rural district.
