= Gerdu, Hormozgan =

Village in Hormozgan province, Iran

Gerdu Persian: گردو
- Village
- Location within Iran
- Coordinates: 26°50′55″N 57°01′32″E
- Country: Iran
- Province: Hormozgan
- County: Sirik
- District: Bemani
- Rural District: Bemani

Population (2016)
  - Total: 1,878
- Time zone: UTC+3:30 (IRST)

Gerdu (Persian: گردو) (Note: Also romanized as Gardū, Gerdū, and Gordū; also known as Gohardū (گهردو)) is a village in Bemani Rural District of Bemani District, Sirik County, Hormozgan province, Iran.

== Demographics ==
=== Population ===
At the time of the 2006 National Census, the village's population was 1,555 in 250 households, when it was in the former Biyaban District of Minab County. The following census in 2011 counted 1,817 people in 372 households, by which time the district had been separated from the county in the establishment of Sirik County. The rural district was transferred to the new Bemani District. The 2016 census measured the population of the village as 1,878 people in 444 households. It was the most populous village in its rural district.
