= Shahidmardan =

Village in Hormozgan province, Iran

Shahidmardan Persian: شهیدمردان
- Village
- Location within Iran
- Coordinates: 26°45′50″N 57°05′41″E
- Country: Iran
- Province: Hormozgan
- County: Sirik
- District: Bemani
- Rural District: Shahmardi

Population (2016)
  - Total: 1,488
- Time zone: UTC+3:30 (IRST)

Shahidmardan (Persian: شهیدمردان) (Note: Also known as Shamardi (شامردی), romanized as Shāmardī; also known as Shāh Mardī) is a village in, and the capital of, Shahmardi Rural District of Bemani District, Sirik County, Hormozgan province, Iran.

== Demographics ==
=== Population ===
At the time of the 2006 National Census, the village's population was 1,186 in 223 households, when it was in Bemani Rural District of the former Biyaban District of Minab County. The following census in 2011 counted 1,330 people in 329 households, by which time the district had been separated from the county in the establishment of Sirik County. Shahidmardan was transferred to Shahmardi Rural District created in the new Bemani District. The 2016 census measured the population of the village as 1,488 people in 429 households. It was the most populous village in its rural district.
