= Shah Mardi =

Shah Mardi (Persian: شه مرادي) may refer to:

- Shamardi
- Shahmardi Rural District, an administrative division of Sirik County, Hormozgan province, Iran
- Shahmoradi
