= Sham Ju =

Village in Hormozgan province, Iran

Sham Ju Persian: شمع جو
- Village
- Location within Iran
- Coordinates: 26°29′52″N 57°07′48″E
- Country: Iran
- Province: Hormozgan
- County: Sirik
- District: Central
- Rural District: Sirik

Population (2016)
  - Total: 1,280
- Time zone: UTC+3:30 (IRST)

Sham Ju (Persian: شمع جو) (Note: Also romanized as Sham‘ Jū) is a village in Sirik Rural District of the Central District of Sirik County, Hormozgan province, Iran.

== Demographics ==
=== Population ===
At the time of the 2006 National Census, the village's population was 1,048 in 170 households, when it was in the former Biyaban District of Minab County. The following census in 2011 counted 1,296 people in 292 households, by which time the district had been separated from the county in the establishment of Sirik County. The rural district was transferred to the new Central District. The 2016 census measured the population of the village as 1,280 people in 333 households. It was the most populous village in its rural district.
