= Bemani (disambiguation) =

Bemani is Konami's music video game division.

It may also refer to:

- Bemani, Iran, a village in Sirik County, Hormozgan province, Iran
- Bemani District, an administrative division of Sirik County, Hormozgan province, Iran
- Bemani Rural District, an administrative division of Sirik County, Hormozgan province, Iran
- Bemāni, Persian title for To Stay Alive, a 2002 Iranian drama film directed by Dariush Mehrjui
- Mahdi Bemani Naeini (born 1968), Iranian film director, cinematographer, TV news producer and photographer

== See also ==
- Bemani Pocket, a short-lived attempt by Konami to capitalize on the market of portable entertainment in the late 1990s
