= Band-e Korman =

Band-e Korman بندكرمان
- Village
- Location within Iran
- Coordinates: 26°38′57″N 57°08′07″E
- Country: Iran
- Province: Hormozgan
- County: Minab
- Bakhsh: Byaban
- Rural District: Sirik

Population (2006)
  - Total: 301
- Time zone: UTC+3:30 (IRST)
  - Summer (DST): UTC+4:30 (IRDT)

Band-e Korman (Persian: بندكرمان, also Romanized as Band-e Kormān; also known as Band-e Garmān, Band-e Germān, and Band-e Gormān) is a village in Sirik Rural District, Byaban District, Minab County, Hormozgan Province, Iran. At the 2006 census, its population was 301, in 66 families.
