= Posht Band, Hormozgan =

Posht Band پشت بند
- Village
- Location within Iran
- Coordinates: 26°15′06″N 57°13′32″E
- Country: Iran
- Province: Hormozgan
- County: Minab
- Bakhsh: Byaban
- Rural District: Byaban

Population (2006)
  - Total: 193
- Time zone: UTC+3:30 (IRST)
  - Summer (DST): UTC+4:30 (IRDT)

Posht Band (Persian: پشت بند) is a village in Byaban Rural District, Byaban District, Minab County, Hormozgan Province, Iran. At the 2006 census, its population was 193, in 38 families.
