= Miandar =

Miandar مياندر
- Village
- Location within Iran
- Coordinates: 26°28′58″N 57°16′22″E
- Country: Iran
- Province: Hormozgan
- County: Minab
- Bakhsh: Byaban
- Rural District: Byaban

Population (2006)
  - Total: 55
- Time zone: UTC+3:30 (IRST)
  - Summer (DST): UTC+4:30 (IRDT)

Miandar (Persian: مياندر, also Romanized as Mīāndar) is a village in Byaban Rural District, Byaban District, Minab County, Hormozgan Province, Iran. At the 2006 census, its population was 55, in 7 families.
