= Mahmelian =

Mahmelian محمليان
- Village
- Location within Iran
- Coordinates: 26°45′58″N 57°05′44″E
- Country: Iran
- Province: Hormozgan
- County: Minab
- Bakhsh: Byaban
- Rural District: Bemani

Population (2006)
  - Total: 36
- Time zone: UTC+3:30 (IRST)
  - Summer (DST): UTC+4:30 (IRDT)

Mahmelian (Persian: محمليان, also Romanized as Maḩmelīān, Mohmalīān, and Mohmalyān) is a village in Bemani Rural District, Byaban District, Minab County, Hormozgan Province, Iran. At the 2006 census, its population was 36, in 7 families.
