= Sikui =

Sikui سيكوئي
- Village
- Location within Iran
- Coordinates: 26°16′32″N 57°13′56″E
- Country: Iran
- Province: Hormozgan
- County: Minab
- Bakhsh: Byaban
- Rural District: Byaban

Population (2006)
  - Total: 427
- Time zone: UTC+3:30 (IRST)
  - Summer (DST): UTC+4:30 (IRDT)

Sikui (Persian: سيكوئي, also Romanized as Sīkū’ī; also known as Sikooh) is a village in Byaban Rural District, Byaban District, Minab County, Hormozgan Province, Iran. At the 2006 census, its population was 427, in 71 families.
