= Taru =

Taru may refer to:

== People ==
=== Given or middle name ===
- Bhai Taru Singh (1720–1745), Sikh martyr
- Taru Kuoppa (born 1983), Finnish competitive archer
- Taru Mäkelä (born 1959), Finnish film director and screenwriter
- Taru Rinne (born 1968), Finnish motorcycle racer

=== Surname ===
- Eugen Taru (1913–1991), Romanian artist
- Yoshikazu Taru (born 1964), Japanese wrestler

== Places ==
- Taru, Iran, a village in Hormozgan Province, Iran
- Taru Jabba, a village in Pakistan
- An alternative name for the Nyiri Desert

== Other uses ==
- Taru (album), a 1968 Lee Morgan album
- The Technical Assistance Response Unit of the New York City Police Department
- Taru (god), an ancient Anatolian weather god
- Taru, a 1984 Indian short animated film by Ram Mohan
