= Sargalm =

Sargalm (Persian: سرگلم) may refer to:

- Sargalm, Bandar Abbas
- Sargalm, Minab
