= Gachineh =

Gachineh (Persian: گچينه) may refer to:

- Gachineh-ye Bala, Hormozgan Province
- Gachineh-ye Pain, Hormozgan Province
- Gachineh, Lorestan
