= Sarderang =

Sarderang سردرنگ
- village
- Location within Iran
- Coordinates: 26°29′50″N 57°14′17″E
- Country: Iran
- Province: Hormozgan
- County: Minab
- Bakhsh: Byaban
- Rural District: Byaban

Population (2006)
  - Total: 94
- Time zone: UTC+3:30 (IRST)
  - Summer (DST): UTC+4:30 (IRDT)

Sarderang (Persian: سردرنگ) is a village in Byaban Rural District, Byaban District, Minab County, Hormozgan Province, Iran. At the 2006 census, its population was 94, in 19 families.
