= Garuk, Hormozgan =

City in Hormozgan province, Iran

Garuk Persian: گروک
- City
- Location within Iran
- Coordinates: 26°35′15″N 57°05′36″E
- Country: Iran
- Province: Hormozgan
- County: Sirik
- District: Central

Population (2016)
  - Total: 4,008
- Time zone: UTC+3:30 (IRST)

Garuk (Persian: گروک) (Note: Also romanized as Garūk and Gorūk; also known as Garū, Garūq, Gerow, Girau, and Guru) is a city in the Central District of Sirik County, Hormozgan province, Iran.

== Demographics ==
=== Population ===
At the time of the 2006 National Census, the village's population was 3,705 in 628 households, when it was a village in Sirik Rural District of the former Biyaban District of Minab County. The following census in 2011 counted 4,243 people in 872 households, by which time the district had been separated from the county in the establishment of Sirik County. The rural district was transferred to the new Central District. The 2016 census measured the population of the village as 4,008 people in 943 households, when Garuk had been elevated to the status of a city.
