= Gurdwara Shahid Ganj Singh Singhania =

Historic Gurdware in Lahore, Pakistan

- ਗੁਰਦੁਆਰਾ ਸ਼ਹੀਦ ਗੰਜ ਸਿੰਘ ਸਿੰਘਣੀਆਂ
- Location within Punjab, Pakistan Location within Pakistan Location within Asia

Religion
- Affiliation: Sikhism

Location
- Location: Naulakha Bazaar, Lahore
- State: Punjab
- Country: Pakistan
- Interactive map of Gurdwara Shahid Ganj Singh Singhania
- Coordinates: 31°34′43″N 74°19′56″E

Architecture
- Groundbreaking: 1716
- Completed: 1753

Website
- sites.ualberta.ca/~rnoor/shaheed_ganj_gurdawara.html

The Gurdwara Shahid Ganj Singh Singhania, also known as Gurdwara Shaheedganj Singh Singhnian, is a historic Sikh gurdwara at Shahidganj in Naulakha Bazaar in Lahore, Pakistan, which marks the site where over 100,000 Sikh men and women lost their lives in the 18th century. According to Neelum Naz, 250,000 Sikhs were killed at the site during the 18th century. Sikhs were executed at the site during the periods of Zakaria Khan, Yahya Khan, Shah Nawaz Khan, Mir Mannu, and Adina Beg. It is located opposite of Gurdwara Bhai Taru Singh. Bhai Mani Singh was martyred at this site on 14 June 1738.

== History ==
=== Zakaria Khan ===
In 1721, Zakariya Khan was appointed governor of Lahore by the Mughal court and embarked on a campaign to eradicate the Sikhs. In 1739, hundred of Sikhs were rounded-up and executed at Lahore at a horse-market that later became known as Shahidganj. Furthermore, anyone caught helping Sikhs would be punished and those who cut the hair of Sikhs, provided a Sikh head, or gave intel on Sikhs were rewarded. In 1745, Zakaria Khan sent a force to Phula village to arrest Bhai Taru Singh, as he had been providing assistance to Sikhs. Bhai Taru Singh was subsequently executed at Lahore.

=== Yahya Khan ===
During the Chhota Ghallughara of 1746, the Sikh inhabitants of Lahore were first rounded up, then executed on 10 March 1746. Hundreds of Sikhs living in Lahore were rounded up and executed. The captives from the group of Sikhs that had been originally encamped in the Kahnuwan jungle but later captured while attempting to escape were marched back to Lahore, paraded in the streets and publicly beheaded. For months, they were held and paraded atop of donkeys in Lahore. The captured Sikhs were ultimately killed specifically at Nakhas Chowk in Lahore. The heads of thousands of Sikhs were carried on carts and hung at the gates of Lahore as trophies. Minarets were constructed out of piles of dismembered Sikh heads and their decapitated and mangled bodies were buried within the walls of a mosque.

=== Shah Nawaz and Mir Mannu ===
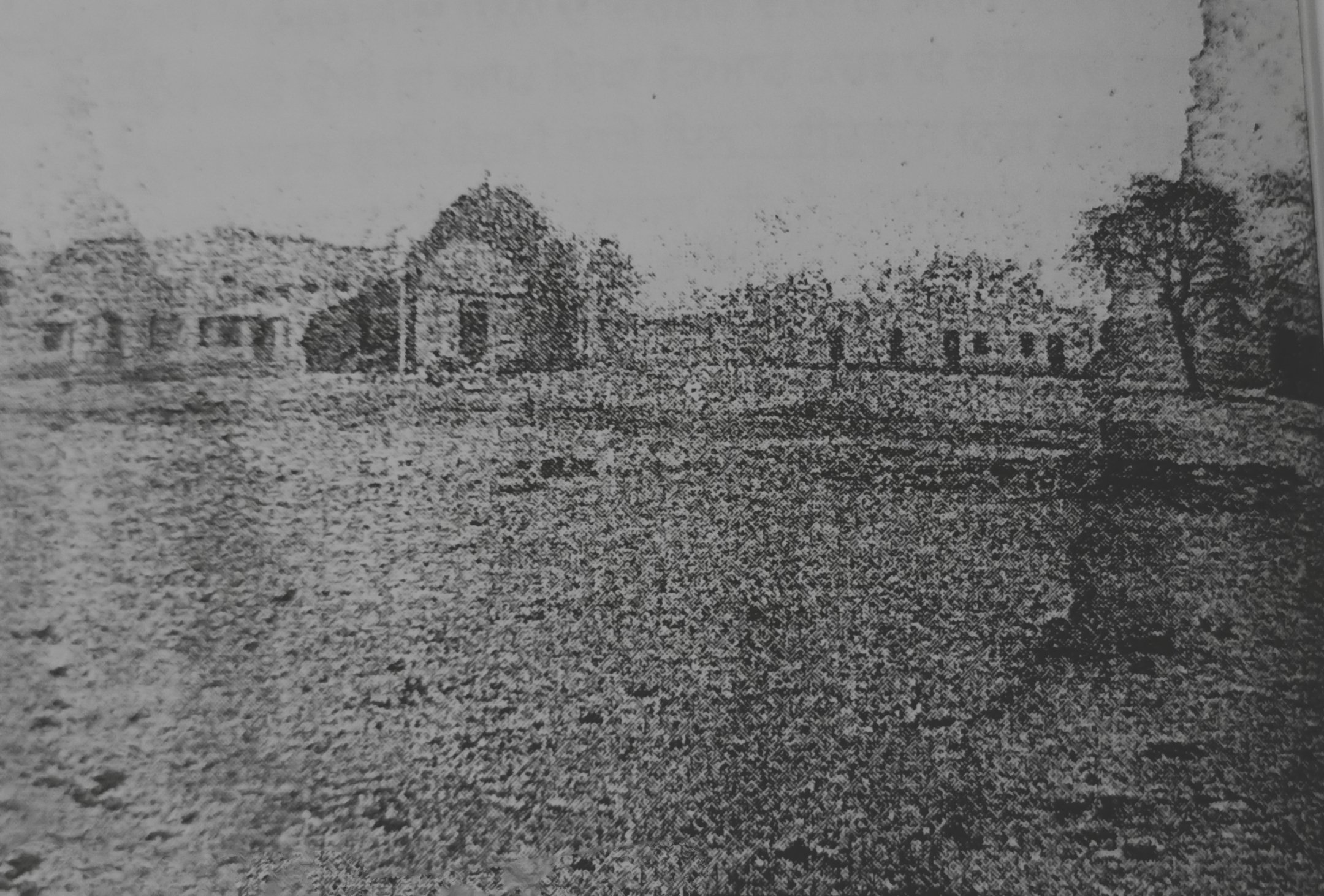
Photograph of Gurdwara Shahid Ganj, ca.1930's

The Mughals officially restarted their anti-Sikh campaign with the appointment of Shah Nawaz as subahdar in 1747. Mir Mannu established a building resembling a mosque at the site where muftis (Muslim judges) would give captives the join between conversion to Islam or execution. Between 1748–53, Mir Mannu had conducted his own persecution of the Sikhs and captured five-hundred Sikhs at Ram Rauni through the assistance of Adina Beg. These Sikhs were tortured and executed at the place now known as Shahidganj in Lahore on the occasion of Eid.

Punjabi historian Ganesh Das makes note of the site of being where many Sikhs were executed:

Large numbers of them (i.e. Sikhs) were shot down, while many others were brought in chains to Lahore where they were executed at a place near the Nakhas outside the Delhi gate, which afterwards came to be called Shahid Ganj

— Ganesh Das, 198; Tahqiqat-e-Chisthi, 101

Sikh women and children were kept in jails at the site, with them being forced to grind wheat and made to starve. The sons of the women were beheaded and their remains thrown into seven nearby wells. According to Sikhs, Sikhs captured by the Pahari Rajas were brought to Lahore, where Mir Mannu beginning in 1748 would tortured and executed them. The torturers would throw Sikh babies in the air and catch them on their spears. Sikh mothers of slain children would have pieces of their murdered children places around their neck as a garland by their captors. Diwan Kaura Mal requested the Sikhs to assist Mir Mannu during the Battle of Multan, therefore he gave the Sikhs control over the site in-response. The Sikhs then built a shrine at the site.

=== Recent history ===
In 1935, a new gurdwara building replaced the old one. A well and kothri were located at the premises. After partition in 1947, the gurdwara became controlled by the Evacuee Trust Property Board. The gurdwara is one of the few Sikh temples still in operation as their original function in Pakistan.

== Location ==
The shrine is located in Naulakha Bazaar at the coordinates 31°34'42.8"N 74°19'55.4"E.

== Architecture ==
The structure is made out of marble and combines old and new styles. A portico is situated on a podium in the centre of the site. The interior of the site is embellished. The remains of holding cells and student quarters can be found at the site.

== See also ==
- List of Gurudwaras
- Gurdwara Darbar Sahib Kartarpur
- Gurudwara Sis Ganj Sahib
- Hazur Sahib Nanded
- Takht Sri Patna Sahib
