= Do Jamilan =

Do Jamilan دوجميلان
- Village
- Location within Iran
- Coordinates: 26°38′32″N 57°09′35″E
- Country: Iran
- Province: Hormozgan
- County: Minab
- Bakhsh: Byaban
- Rural District: Sirik

Population (2006)
  - Total: 121
- Time zone: UTC+3:30 (IRST)
  - Summer (DST): UTC+4:30 (IRDT)

Do Jamilan (Persian: دوجميلان, also Romanized as Do Jamīlān; also known as Do Jambīlān, Dojembīlān, and Dowjamīrān) is a village in Sirik Rural District, Byaban District, Minab County, Hormozgan Province, Iran. At the 2006 census, its population was 121, in 23 families.
