= Konarju =

Konarju كنارجو
- Village
- Location within Iran
- Coordinates: 26°44′16″N 57°06′07″E
- Country: Iran
- Province: Hormozgan
- County: Minab
- Bakhsh: Byaban
- Rural District: Bemani

Population (2006)
  - Total: 876
- Time zone: UTC+3:30 (IRST)
  - Summer (DST): UTC+4:30 (IRDT)

Konarju (Persian: كنارجو, also Romanized as Konārjū, Kanār Jū, Kenar Joo, and Kenārjū) is a village in Bemani Rural District, Byaban District, Minab County, Hormozgan Province, Iran. At the 2006 census, its population was 876, in 182 families.
