= Mehregi =

Mehregi مهرگي
- Village
- Location within Iran
- Coordinates: 26°19′39″N 57°11′07″E
- Country: Iran
- Province: Hormozgan
- County: Minab
- Bakhsh: Byaban
- Rural District: Byaban

Population (2006)
  - Total: 333
- Time zone: UTC+3:30 (IRST)
  - Summer (DST): UTC+4:30 (IRDT)

Mehregi (Persian: مهرگي, also Romanized as Mehregī and Mahragī; also known as Maḩreqī) is a village in Byaban Rural District, Byaban District, Minab County, Hormozgan Province, Iran. At the 2006 census, its population was 333, in 61 families.
