= Mastu =

Village in Iran

Mastu (Persian: مستو, also Romanized as Mastū) is a village in Byaban Rural District, Byaban District, Minab County, Hormozgan Province, Iran. At the 2006 census, its population was 72, in 11 families.
