= Byaban =

Byaban (Persian: بیابان) may refer to:

- Byaban District
- Byaban Rural District
