= Gandomi =

Gandomi گندمي
- Village
- Location within Iran
- Coordinates: 26°38′28″N 57°08′59″E
- Country: Iran
- Province: Hormozgan
- County: Minab
- Bakhsh: Byaban
- Rural District: Sirik

Population (2006)
  - Total: 84
- Time zone: UTC+3:30 (IRST)
  - Summer (DST): UTC+4:30 (IRDT)

Gandomi (Persian: گندمي, also romanized as Gandomī) is a village in Sirik Rural District, Byaban District, Minab County, Hormozgan Province, Iran. At the 2006 census its population was 84, in 17 families.
