= Garaik =

Garaik گرائيك
- Village
- Location within Iran
- Coordinates: 26°28′50″N 57°17′09″E
- Country: Iran
- Province: Hormozgan
- County: Minab
- Bakhsh: Byaban
- Rural District: Byaban

Population (2006)
  - Total: 291
- Time zone: UTC+3:30 (IRST)
  - Summer (DST): UTC+4:30 (IRDT)

Garaik (Persian: گرائيك, also Romanized as Garā’īk) is a village in Byaban Rural District, Byaban District, Minab County, Hormozgan Province, Iran. At the 2006 census, its population was 291, in 45 families.
