= Karpan =

Karpan may refer to:

- Karpan, Iran, village in Hormozgan Province, Iran
- Karpan (character), character in the comic album series Yoko Tsuno
- Karpan (surname)
