= Salmehi =

Salmehi سلمه اي
- Village
- Location within Iran
- Coordinates: 26°17′33″N 57°13′27″E
- Country: Iran
- Province: Hormozgan
- County: Minab
- Bakhsh: Byaban
- Rural District: Byaban

Population (2006)
  - Total: 221
- Time zone: UTC+3:30 (IRST)
  - Summer (DST): UTC+4:30 (IRDT)

Salmehi (Persian: سلمه اي, also Romanized as Salmeh’ī; also known as Mosalmeh’ī and Moslemhī) is a village in Byaban Rural District, Byaban District, Minab County, Hormozgan Province, Iran. At the 2006 census, its population was 221, in 35 families.
