= Gaz Pir =

Gaz Pir گزپير
- Village
- Location within Iran
- Coordinates: 26°21′16″N 57°11′56″E
- Country: Iran
- Province: Hormozgan
- County: Minab
- Bakhsh: Byaban
- Rural District: Byaban

Population (2006)
  - Total: 240
- Time zone: UTC+3:30 (IRST)
  - Summer (DST): UTC+4:30 (IRDT)

Gaz Pir (Persian: گزپير, also Romanized as Gaz Pīr; also known as Gaspīr) is a village in Byaban Rural District, Byaban District, Minab County, Hormozgan Province, Iran. At the 2006 census, its population was 240, in 39 families.
