= Pegu, Iran =

Pegu پگو
- Village
- Location within Iran
- Coordinates: 26°20′43″N 57°20′26″E
- Country: Iran
- Province: Hormozgan
- County: Minab
- Bakhsh: Byaban
- Rural District: Byaban

Population (2006)
  - Total: 332
- Time zone: UTC+3:30 (IRST)
  - Summer (DST): UTC+4:30 (IRDT)

Pegu (Persian: پگو, also Romanized as Pegū and Pogū) is a village in Byaban Rural District, Byaban District, Minab County, Hormozgan Province, Iran. At the 2006 census, its population was 332, in 59 families.
