= Jifiri =

Jifiri جیفری
- Village
- Location within Iran
- Coordinates: 26°26′30″N 57°13′12″E
- Country: Iran
- Province: Hormozgan
- County: Minab
- Bakhsh: Byaban
- Rural District: Byaban

Population (2006)
  - Total: 352
- Time zone: UTC+3:30 (IRST)
  - Summer (DST): UTC+4:30 (IRDT)

Jifiri (Persian: جیفری, also Romanized as Jīfirī) is a village in Byaban Rural District, Byaban District, Minab County, Hormozgan Province, Iran. At the 2006 census, its population was 352, in 54 families.
