= Shahidganj =

Site in Lahore, Pakistan

Shahidganj, also spelt as Shaheedganj, originally Nakhas Chowk, is a square in Naulakha Bazaar, Lahore, Punjab, Pakistan. It is located near Delhi Gate. Thousands of Sikhs were publicly executed at the location during the 18th century. Sikhs were executed at the site during the periods of Zakaria Khan, Yahya Khan, Shah Nawaz Khan, Mir Mannu, and Adina Beg. The site was the location of a legal battle between the Muslim and Sikh communities during British-rule in the early 20th century.

== History ==
The location was originally the Nakhas Chowk, a place where captives, horses and cattle taken as booty were sold. Earlier in Delhi, hundreds of followers of Banda Singh Bahadur had been publicly executed at Chandni Chowk. During Farrukhsiyar's reign from 1713 to 1719, a bounty was placed on the head of every Sikh. This policy was continued by Zakaria Khan in the Lahore Subah.

The Abdullah Khan Mosque was built by Abdullah Khan during the reign of Mughal Emperor Muhammad Shah. Khan was a cook of Prince Dara Shikoh, the elder son of Shah Jahan, and in 1743 CE, rose up to the position of kotwal (Chief police officer) of Lahore for his services. The mosque was completed in 1134 AH (1721/1722 CE) by the Falak Beg Khan, and was built on the premises of the shrine to Pir Shah Kaku. In one deed, Sheikh Din Mohammad and his lineage were designated as Mutawalis. The wakf endowment incorporated a school, a well, and an orchard.

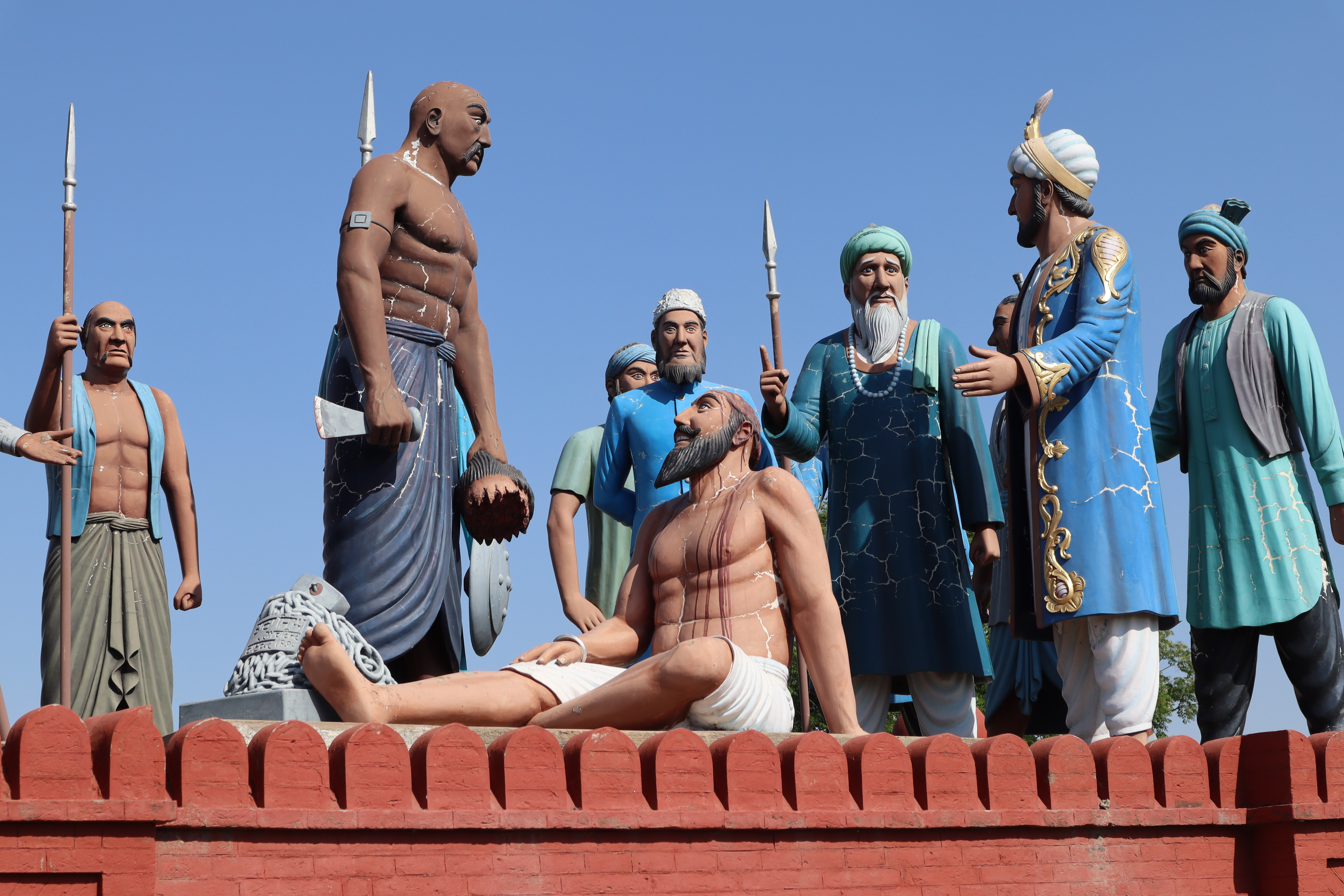
Diorama sculptural monument of the torture and execution of Bhai Taru Singh at Shahidganj, located at Gurdwara Mehdiana Sahib, Mehdiana, Ludhiana district, Punjab, India, 9 April 2023.

In 1721, Zakariya Khan was appointed governor of Lahore by the Mughal court and embarked on a campaign to eradicate the Sikhs. During the governor's reign, the gashti fauj brought Sikhs to be killed at the site. During Nader Shah's invasion of India, Sikhs faced persecution from the invading force. In 1739, hundred of Sikhs were rounded-up and executed at Lahore at a horse-market that later became known as Shahidganj. Furthermore, anyone caught helping Sikhs would be punished and those who cut the hair of Sikhs, provided a Sikh head, or gave intel on Sikhs were rewarded. In 1743, Haqiqat Rai was executed. In 1745, Zakaria Khan sent a force to Phula village to arrest Bhai Taru Singh, as he had been providing assistance to Sikhs. Bhai Taru Singh was subsequently executed at Lahore.

During the Chhota Ghallughara of 1746, the Sikh inhabitants of Lahore were first rounded up, then executed on 10 March 1746. Hundreds of Sikhs living in Lahore were rounded up and executed. The captives from the group of Sikhs that had been originally encamped in the Kahnuwan jungle but later captured while attempting to escape were marched back to Lahore, paraded in the streets and publicly beheaded. For months, they were held and paraded atop of donkeys in Lahore. The captured Sikhs were ultimately killed specifically at Nakhas Chowk in Lahore. The heads of thousands of Sikhs were carried on carts and hung at the gates of Lahore as trophies. Minarets were constructed out of piles of dismembered Sikh heads and their decapitated and mangled bodies were buried within the walls of a mosque.

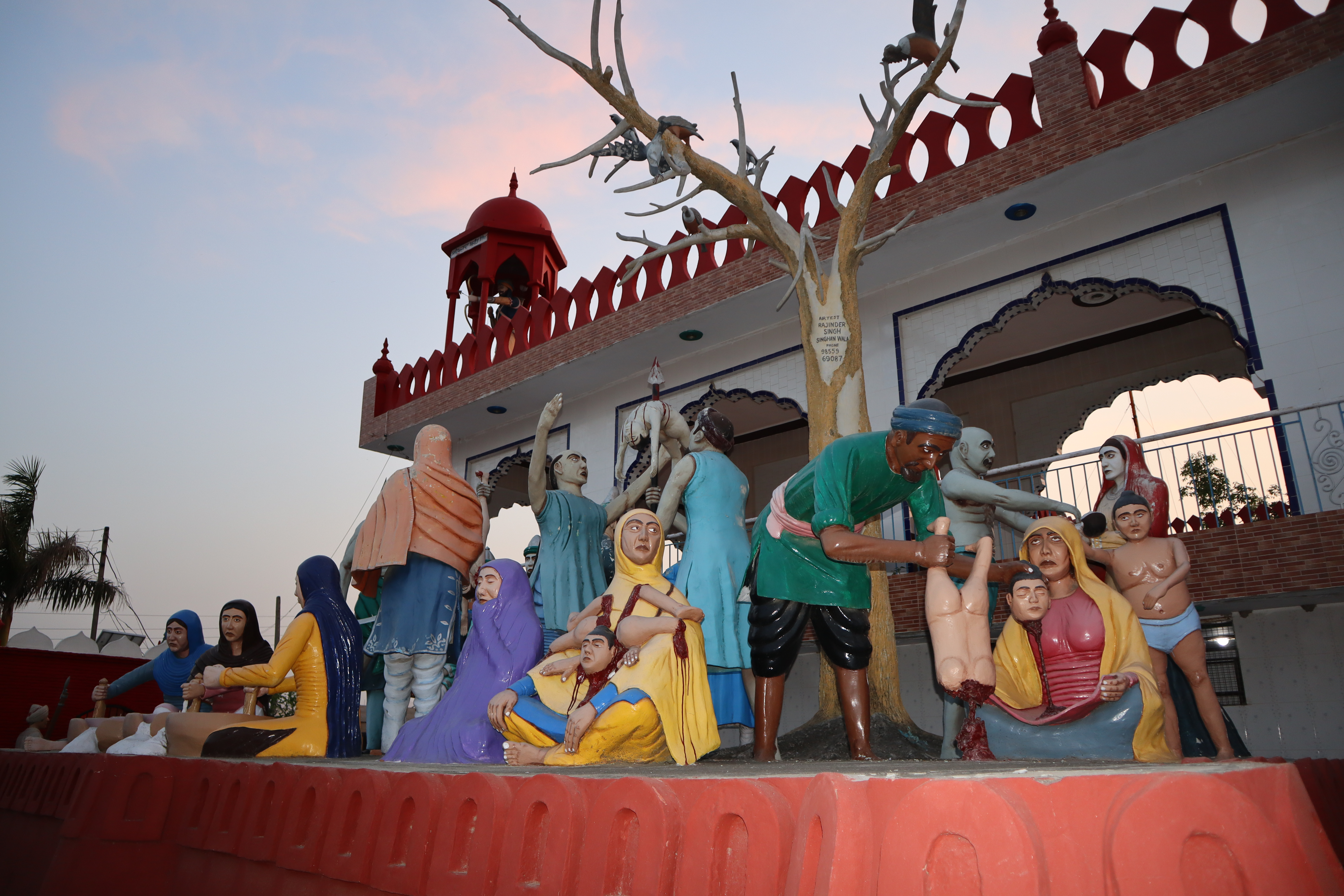
Diorama sculptural monument of Sikh women & children being enslaved, tortured, & executed during the governorship of Mir Mannu, located at Gurdwara Shaheed Baba Tega Singh Ji, Chand Purana, Bagha Purana tehsil, Moga district, Punjab, India, April 2023

The Mughals officially restarted their anti-Sikh campaign with the appointment of Shah Nawaz as subahdar in 1747. Between 1748 and 1753, Mir Mannu had conducted his own persecution of the Sikhs and captured five-hundred Sikhs at Ram Rauni through the assistance of Adina Beg. These Sikhs were tortured and executed at the place now known as Shahidganj in Lahore on the occasion of Eid.

Punjabi historian Ganesh Das makes note of the site of being where many Sikhs were executed:

Large numbers of them (i.e. Sikhs) were shot down, while many others were brought in chains to Lahore where they were executed at a place near the Nakhas outside the Delhi gate, which afterwards came to be called Shahid Ganj

— Ganesh Das, 198; Tahqiqat-e-Chisthi, 101

In 1762, the Bhangi Misl Sikh army conquered Lahore and occupied the mosque, together with the public square. The Muslims were not allowed to enter and pray, although Sikhs were given the right to pray. The Sikhs built a gurdwara called Gurudwara Shaheed Bhai Taru Singh in remembrance of Sikh martyrs in the courtyard while the Mosque building was used as a residence for the Sikh priest. The Guru Granth Sahib was installed in a part of the mosque. Remaining sections were either leased to tenants or utilized for the storage of chaff and refuse. Meanwhile, the area adjacent to the mosque was named Shahidganj due to the deaths of Bhai Taru Singh and many other Sikhs at the exact spot. Therefore, the mosque took-on the new name of Shahidganj Mosque.

After a lengthy legal battle and a sudden demolition of the Shahidganj Mosque by the Sikhs, a gurdwara was built over the site of the former mosque to accompany the older gurdwara dedicated to Taru Singh. In December 2022, Pakistan's Evacuee Trust Property Board closed Gurdwara Shaheed Bhai Taru Singh to the public. The site receives few visitors.

== Legal dispute over ownership ==
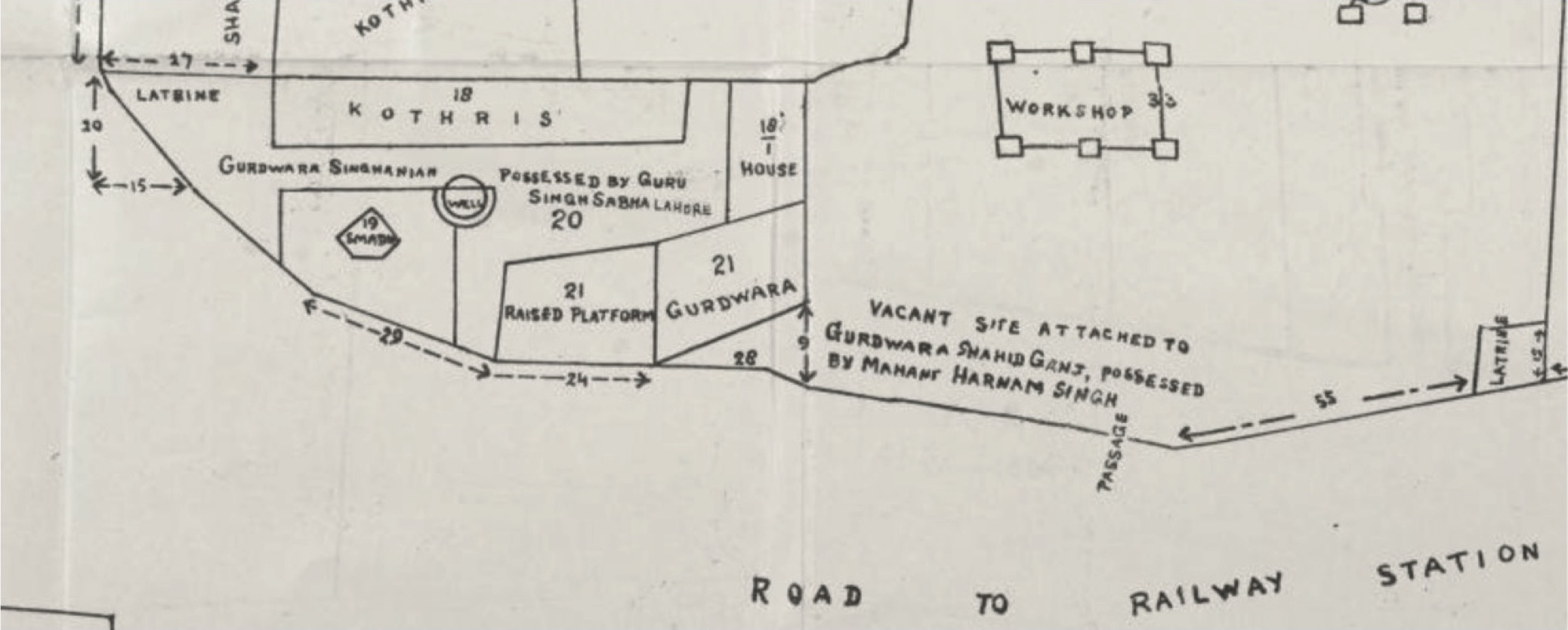
1928 map of the site

The Muslim community claimed that the Shahidganj Mosque at the site had been constructed during Mughal-rule by Abdullah Khan during the regime of Shah Jahan. Meanwhile, the Sikhs had constructed a gurdwara at the site after their conquest of Lahore in the mid-18th century. Furthermore, the Sikhs took control of the mosque during their rule and housed a Sikh priest within it. After British annexation of the Punjab, a Muslim man named Nur Ahmad claimed to be the Mutawalli of the mosque and filed a peition in the courts on 17 April 1850 for control of the site against the Sikh custodians Jiwan Singh and Ganda Singh, but his case was dismissed. He further tried the same in 1853 and 1883. The imam of the Taxali gate mosque in Lahore named Mehar Shah had filed a petition in April 1883 for the site to be given to the Muslims but his case was similarly dismissed by the Deputy Commissioner of Lahore.

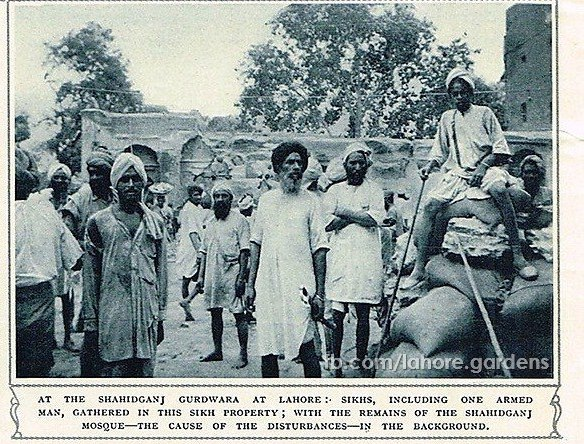
Photograph of the dispute and demolition of the Shaheed Ganj Mosque in Lahore - Sikhs gathered at the site, including one who is armed with a weapon, 1935.

The Sikhs defended their ownership of the site by stating the mosque was used to pass judgments on Sikhs in the past and the area was the site of thousands of executions of Sikhs, with these events being memorialized by Gurdwara Shahidganj Singhnian. Meanwhile, the Muslim position was founded on the principle that, under Shariat, a mosque consecrated as Waqf remains a mosque in perpetuity. The Munsif of Lahore stated that the area was the propoerty of a religious institution headed by a mahant (classified as a manager or trustee), thus was considered an endowed property. The courts shifted control over the site from the mahant custodian to the Shiromani Gurdwara Parbandhak Committee with the Gurdwaras Act in 1925. A notification of the act on 22 December 1927 gave ownership of the mosque building and adjacent land to the adjacent Gurdwara Bhai Taru Singh. The Anjuman Islamia of the Punjab tried filing a claim against this but all these claims were rejected by on 20 January 1930 by the Sikh Gurdwaras Tribunal. Rumours were being shared that the SGPC planned to demolish the mosque at the site in early July 1935, leading to Muslim unrest. The SGPC demolished the mosque on 7 July 1935 during the night, sparking religious riots in 1935–36 between the two communities in the city. Eventually, the Muslim side launched a civil case regarding the matter, being represented by M. Alam, Malik Barkat Ali, and F. J. Coltman whilst the SGPC were represented by Rai Bahadur Badridas and Sardar Harnam Singh. Eventually, the case was dismissed due to Justice Din Mohammed's dissent. Sikandar Hayat Khan and Mohammed Ali Jinnah would eventually accept the verdict of the law over the site. A gurdwara was constructed over the site of the former mosque. After Pakistani independence, the Pakistani courts did not reverse the earlier legal judgement regarding the site.

== List of religious sites ==
- Shahidganj Mosque (no longer extant)
- Pir Kaku Shah's tomb
- Gurdwara Shahid Ganj Singh Singhania
- Gurdwara Shaheed Bhai Taru Singh
