= Rutan =

Rutan may refer to:

- Rutan, Iran, a village in Hormozgan Province, Iran
- Burt Rutan, American aircraft designer
- Dick Rutan, American test pilot, and brother of Burt Rutan
- Erik Rutan, American metal guitarist and producer
- Rutan (Doctor Who), a member of a fictional alien race from the British television series Doctor Who
- Rutan, a planet in the Star Wars universe.

== See also ==
- Routan (disambiguation)
