= Sargalm, Minab =

Sargalm سرگلم
- Village
- Location within Iran
- Coordinates: 26°47′35″N 57°02′14″E
- Country: Iran
- Province: Hormozgan
- County: Minab
- Bakhsh: Byaban
- Rural District: Bemani

Population (2006)
  - Total: 230
- Time zone: UTC+3:30 (IRST)
  - Summer (DST): UTC+4:30 (IRDT)

Sargalm (Persian: سرگلم) is a village in Bemani Rural District, Byaban District, Minab County, Hormozgan Province, Iran. At the 2006 census, its population was 230, in 39 families.
