= Karpan, Iran =

Karpan كرپان
- Village
- Location within Iran
- Coordinates: 26°46′00″N 57°05′00″E
- Country: Iran
- Province: Hormozgan
- County: Minab
- Bakhsh: Byaban
- Rural District: Bemani

Population (2016)
  - Total: 823
- Time zone: UTC+3:30 (IRST)

Karpan (Persian: كرپان) (Note: Also romanized as Karpān) is a village in Bemani Rural District, Byaban District, Minab County, Hormozgan Province, Iran. At the 2006 census, its population was 686, in 136 households, and in 2016 its population was 823 and 230 households.
