= Gachineh-ye Bala =

Gachineh-ye Bala گچينه بالا
- Village
- Location within Iran
- Coordinates: 26°47′29″N 57°04′06″E
- Country: Iran
- Province: Hormozgan
- County: Minab
- Bakhsh: Byaban
- Rural District: Bemani

Population (2006)
  - Total: 113
- Time zone: UTC+3:30 (IRST)
  - Summer (DST): UTC+4:30 (IRDT)

Gachineh-ye Bala (Persian: گچينه بالا, also Romanized as Gachīneh-ye Bālā; also known as Gachīneh) is a village in Bemani Rural District, Byaban District, Minab County, Hormozgan Province, Iran. At the 2006 census, its population was 113, in 17 families.
