= Gedu-ye Pain =

Gedu-ye Pain گدوپايين
- Village
- Location within Iran
- Coordinates: 26°19′04″N 57°16′45″E
- Country: Iran
- Province: Hormozgan
- County: Minab
- Bakhsh: Byaban
- Rural District: Byaban

Population (2006)
  - Total: 200
- Time zone: UTC+3:30 (IRST)
  - Summer (DST): UTC+4:30 (IRDT)

Gedu-ye Pain (Persian: گدوپايين, also Romanized as Gedū-ye Pā’īn and Gedū Pā’īn; also known as Gedū) is a village in Byaban Rural District, Byaban District, Minab County, Hormozgan Province, Iran. At the 2006 census, its population was 200, in 35 families.
