= Gavajag, Hormozgan =

Gavajag گوجگ
- Village
- Location within Iran
- Coordinates: 26°30′12″N 57°16′25″E
- Country: Iran
- Province: Hormozgan
- County: Minab
- Bakhsh: Byaban
- Rural District: Byaban

Population (2006)
  - Total: 326
- Time zone: UTC+3:30 (IRST)
  - Summer (DST): UTC+4:30 (IRDT)

Gavajag (Persian: گوجگ, also Romanized as Gavājag) is a village in Byaban Rural District, Byaban District, Minab County, Hormozgan Province, Iran. At the 2006 census, its population was 326, in 62 families.
