= Gavajag =

Gavajag (Persian: گوجگ) may refer to:

- Gavajag, Hormozgan, Iran
- Gavajag, Sistan and Baluchestan, a settlement in Sistan and Baluchestan Province, Iran
