= Gedu =

Gedu may refer to:

== People ==
- Gedu Andargachew, Ethiopian politician

== Places ==
- Gedu, Bhutan
- Gedu, Iran
