= Turu =

Turu may refer to:

- Turu people (Tanzania), an ethnic and linguistic group in Tanzania who speak the bantu language Kinyaturu
- Turu people, an ethnic group in Indonesia, speakers of Iau language
- Turu language or Nyaturu language, a Bantu language
- Turu (Iau) language, a Papuan language spoken in Indonesia

== Given name and surname ==
- Turu Flores or José Oscar Flores (born 1971), Argentine retired professional footballer
- Turu Rizzo (1894–1961), Maltese water polo player
- Charles Turu Tumahai (1949–1995), New Zealand singer, bass player and songwriter
- István Turu (1962–2021), Hungarian boxer

== Places ==
- Turu, Iran, village in Sirik Rural District, Byaban District, Minab County, Hormozgan Province, Iran
- Turu Island (두루섬), a large island in the Taedong River in Pyongyang, North Korea
- Tura, Krasnoyarsk Krai (Turu in Evenki), a village in Evenkiysky District, Krasnoyarsk Krai, Russia

== See also ==
- Turu Cay, Queensland, a Torres Strait Island between Queensland, Australia and Papua New Guinea
- TuRU Düsseldorf, a German sports club (football and handball) from Düsseldorf
- Turu Qullu, a mountain in the Bolivian Andes
- Turu, the Wacky Hen, a 2019 Spanish-Argentine animated film
- Turku (Turu in Estonian), a city in Finland
