= Tahrui =

Tahrui طاهرويي
- Village
- Location within Iran
- Coordinates: 26°33′08″N 57°06′07″E
- Country: Iran
- Province: Hormozgan
- County: Minab
- Bakhsh: Byaban
- Rural District: Sirik

Population (2006)
  - Total: 442
- Time zone: UTC+3:30 (IRST)
  - Summer (DST): UTC+4:30 (IRDT)

Tahrui (Persian: طاهرويي, also Romanized as Ţāhrū’ī and Ţāherū’ī; also known as Ţāherānī, Ţāherū, Tarū, and Turu) is a village in Sirik Rural District, Byaban District, Minab County, Hormozgan Province, Iran. At the 2006 census, its population was 442, in 65 families.
