= Shahmardi Rural District =

Rural district in Hormozgan province, Iran

Shahmardi Rural District Persian: دهستان شاهمردی
- Rural District
- Location within Iran
- Coordinates: 26°44′18″N 57°09′01″E
- Country: Iran
- Province: Hormozgan
- County: Sirik
- District: Bemani
- Capital: Shamardi

Population (2016)
  - Total: 5,548
- Time zone: UTC+3:30 (IRST)

Shahmardi Rural District (Persian: دهستان شاهمردی) is in Bemani District of Sirik County, Hormozgan province, Iran. Its capital is the village of Shahidmardan.

== History ==
After the 2006 National Census, Biyaban District was separated from Minab County in the establishment of Sirik County. Shahmardi Rural District was created in the new Bemani District.

== Demographics ==
=== Population ===
At the time of the 2011 census, the rural district's population was 5,285 in 1,283 households. The 2016 census measured the population of the rural district as 5,548 in 1,546 households. The most populous of its 10 villages was Shahidmardan, with 1,486 people.
