= Bhai Taru Singh =

Sikh martyr (1720–1745)

- ਭਾਈ ਤਾਰੂ ਸਿੰਘ
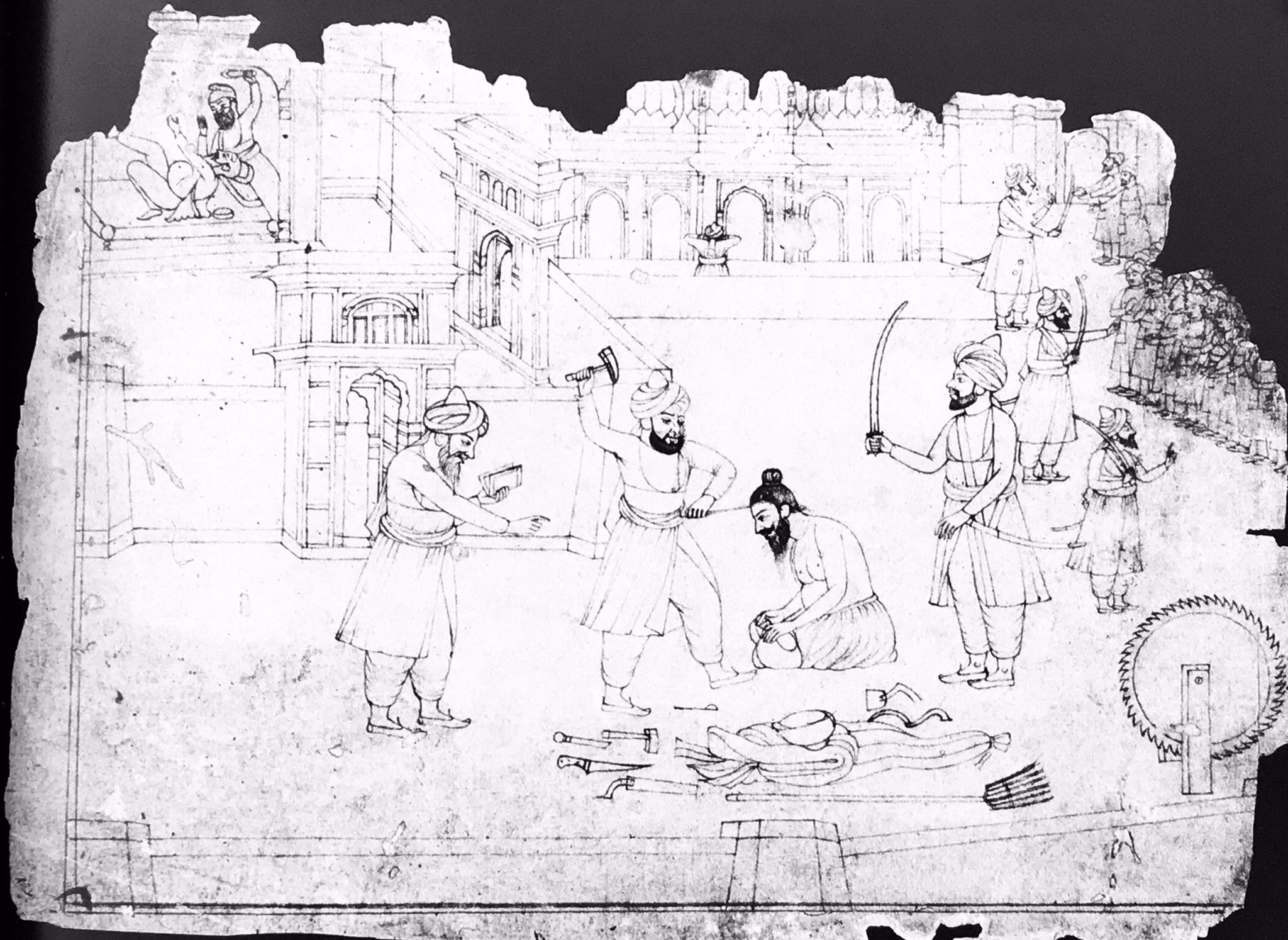
- Incomplete 19th century drawing depicting the martyrdom of Taru Singh

Personal life
- Born: 1720 Amritsar, Bhangi Misl, Punjab (present-day Punjab, India)
- Died: 1 July 1745 (aged 24–25) Lahore, Lahore Subah, Mughal Empire (present-day Punjab, Pakistan)
- Cause of death: Execution by scalping
- Parents: Bhai Jodh Singh (father); Bibi Dharam Kaur (mother)

Religious life
- Religion: Sikhism

Bhai Taru Singh (Punjabi: ਭਾਈ ਤਾਰੂ ਸਿੰਘ; c. 1720 – 1 July 1745) was a prominent Sikh martyr known for sacrificing his life, for protecting his Sikh values, by having had his head scalped rather than cutting his hair and converting to Islam. He is remembered by Sikhs as one of their notable martyrs of the 18th century.

== Biography ==
Bhai Taru Singh was born around 1720 in Amritsar during the reign of the Mughal Empire. He was raised as a Sikh by his widowed mother and had one sister, Tar Kaur. Singh was engaged in agriculture at Poolha, Kasur, Lahore District, where he had a small farm and grew maize.

Upon witnessing Sikh fighters save a poor girl from the clutches of the Mughal oppressors, Bhai Taru Singh decided to become initiated into the Khalsa. During this time, Sikh revolutionaries were plotting the overthrow of the Mughal governor of Punjab, Zakaria Khan. Singh and his sister gave food and other aid to the gursikhs (devout Sikhs of the Guru). An informant, named Aqil Das, reported them to Zakaria Khan and the two were arrested for treason. Some sources, however, say that a mahant (akin to a 'great priest') was the one to have tipped off Mughal authorities because Bhai Taru Singh was harboring Sikh fighters. Though his sister's freedom was bribed for by the villagers, Singh refused to seek a pardon.

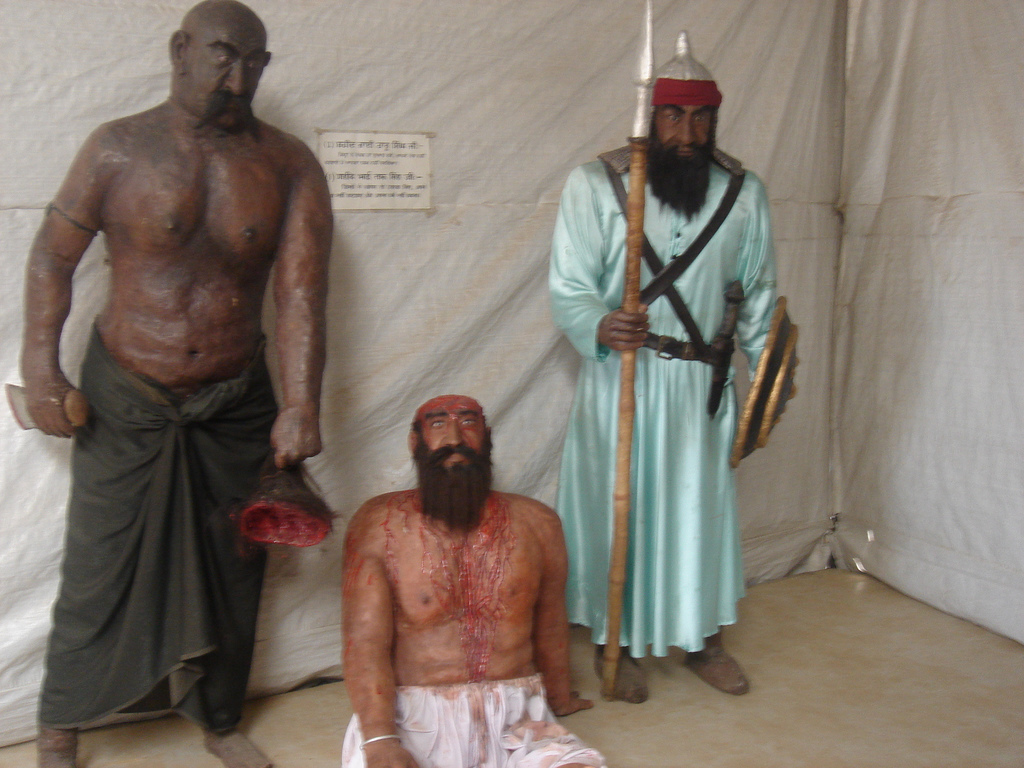
Diorama depicting Bhai Taru Singh being scalped by Mughal soldiers

After a period of imprisonment and torture, Bhai Taru Singh was brought before the Khan who asked him where he got his powers from to endure all of the agony. His reply was through his keshas ('unshorn hair') blessed by Guru Gobind Singh. Zakaria Khan ordered a barber to cut his hair to deprive him of his power and strength. According to Sikh lore, when the barber attempted to do so, his hair became as strong as iron. Angered by this, the emperor ordered his scalp be cut off. According to prominent early Sikh historian Ratan Singh Bhangu, in response to having his scalp torn off, Taru Singh cursed Zakaria Khan, saying he would be killed by his shoes. According to Sikh sources, after cutting Singh's scalp, Zakaria Khan was stricken with unbearable pain and the inability to urinate. As a last resort, Khan sent an apology to the Khalsa Panth for his persecution of Sikhs and begged for forgiveness. It was suggested that if Khan hit himself with Singh's shoes, his condition might be lifted. Although it would cure Khan of his condition, he died 22 days later from having hit himself with the shoes, just as Singh predicted. Upon hearing that he had outlived the Khan, Bhai Taru Singh let go of his breath of his own will on 1 July 1745.

== Legacy ==
In AD 1762, the Bhangi Sikh Sardar army conquered Lahore and took over the public square (now known as Shahidganj) where Singh was scalped. The Abdullah Khan Mosque adjacent to the square was also occupied and converted into Shaheed Ganj Gurdwara. On the location today, Gurdwara Shaheed Bhai Taru Singh in Naulakha Bazaar, marks the place where Singh's scalp was removed.

Two gurdwaras dedicated to Bhai Taru Singh were located in Lahore, namely Gurdwara Shaheedganj Bhai Taru Singh (located near Gurdwara Shaheedganj Singh Singhnian in Naulakha Bazaar) and Gurdwara Shaheed Bhai Taru Singh (located near Hanuman Gali in Gumti Bazaar in the walled city of Lahore). Only the gateway of Gurdwara Shaheed Bhai Taru Singh still exists, the actual gurdwara is no longer extant.

== Popular culture ==
=== Films ===
- A print representing Singh's martyrdom is present in the 2007 film The Darjeeling Limited, in a scene set in a Sikh temple.
- A 3D-animated film about Bhai Taru Singh was released globally on 27 April 2018, directed by Vismaad Singh.

== See also ==
- Gurdwara Shaheed Bhai Taru Singh
- List of Sikhs
- Chhota Ghallughara
