= Anti-Sikh sentiment =

Fear or prejudice against Sikhs

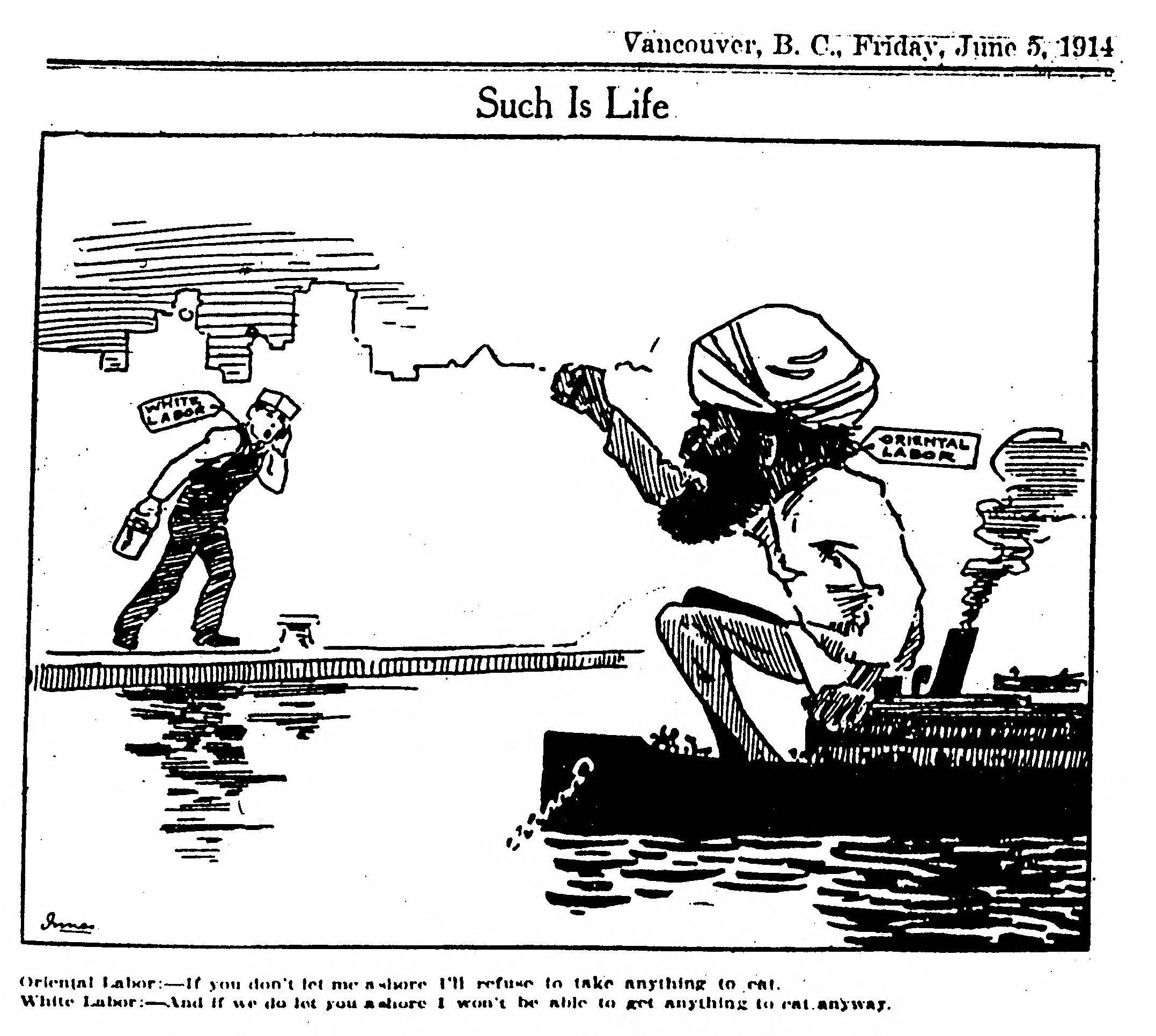
Racist caricature in a Vancouver newspaper of a Sikh man representing "Oriental Labor", 1914

Anti-Sikh sentiment, also known as Sikhophobia, is fear or prejudice against Sikhs. Anti-Sikh sentiment can be motivated by an ethnic hatred of Sikhs or religious hatred of Sikhism, but in Western countries (especially the US and UK) it can also be fuelled by Islamophobia, stemming from a conflation of Sikhs and Muslims due to the racialization of Islamophobia, with Sikhs sharing the same racial background with many Muslims. Sikhs have been targets of hate crimes and discrimination due to various reasons such as appearance (turban, baptized Sikh, having uncut hair) language and the colour of their skin. Therefore, both Sikh men and women are at an increased risk of suffering from racism because of these intersectional ways of oppression that can impact the way Sikhs are treated in society.

Historically, anti-Sikh discrimination began in the roots of India. With a prominent Hindu government and institutions, Sikh's were looked down upon due to the differences with class (Sikhs being farmers), culture, and religious practices. This being said, in the 1980s, Sikh separatists in Punjab demanded an independent homeland, called Khalistan. In 1984, Prime Minister Indira Gandhi ordered a massive military action against those who were sheltering in Amritsar's Golden Temple, the faith's holiest shrine.

In modern times it is not just the cultural and religious difference, there is overlapping forms of oppression that hatred is fuelled, such as anti-immigration, appearance, class, religious practices and the misdirected islamophobia.

Attacks on Sikhs have increased in the aftermath of Islamic terrorist attacks or major political/military events in the Middle East, as Sikhs are often mistakenly perceived as being Muslims. Since 2020, anti-Sikh racism has grown online, in-person, and systematically across the world. Sikh gurdwaras when targeted are often vandalized by spray-painting Islamophobic or white-supremacist messages or imagery.

In present times, Sikhs are being attacked and hate crimes. In particular, suburban areas where there is a less dense Sikh communities may be more prone to hate crimes. These hate crimes can be associated with their appearance, religion and language barriers in a Western societies that are not accepting of the community. Sikhs have claimed that anti-Sikh hatred has been ignored by local governments and policy-makers despite recent rises in anti-Sikh crimes and incidents. Sikhs have increased educational awareness campaigns worldwide on who Sikhs are to decrease the incidence of mistargeted Islamophobic attacks on Sikhs.

== Definitions ==
The APPG for British Sikhs in its 2020 report defines anti-Sikh hate as "any incident or crime which is perceived by the victim or any other person to be religiously or racially motivated by hostility, hatred or prejudice against Sikhs or those perceived to be Sikh people, Gurdwaras, organisations or property".

== By country ==
=== Canada ===
Anti-Sikh hate speech has been on the rise in Canada.

=== India ===
In 1984, many Sikhs were massacred in India in-response to the assassination of Indira Gandhi.

=== United Kingdom ===
Sikhs started immigrating to the UK in notable numbers in the 1950s onwards via direct migration from India or by twice-migration (such as by via East Africa), with them experiencing racism from the onset of arrival. Racism against South Asians, including Sikhs, peaked during the 1970s and early '80's in the United Kingdom, with all South Asians being referred to as "Pakis" by racists. The anti-immigration movement in the UK later specialized into being hostile towards Muslims rather than all South Asians in-general, being tied to the Salman Rushdie affair in 1989 and First Gulf War. However, Islamophobia is tied with attacks and discrimination against Sikhs, as racists cannot or do not bother to differentiate between Muslims and Sikhs in their hate, conflating religion with race. After 9/11, images of Ayatollah Khomeini, Osama bin Laden, and the Taliban, all of whom don a turban and have long-beards just like Sikhs, began to be circulated. By the early 2000s, this reinforced the view that turbans and beards were associated with terrorism and being an enemy, with Sikh men in-particular being targeted as a result result due to the Sikh turban being conflated with the Muslim kaffiyeh and both groups tending to grow long beards. For example, in 2009 there was an incident in Luton where an Islamic extremist group made provocative remarks and in-return, the Sikh mayor of Luton who wore a turban, Lakhbir Singh, was kicked to the ground in a retaliatory attack.

In 1996, a Sikh pupil named Vijay Singh from Manchester committed suicide due to bullying at his predominantly-white school over his turban, with teachers and administration being oblivious to the issue. In recent years, anti-Sikh racism in British schools has been increasing.

After the 2005 London bombings, two gurdwaras in Kent and Leeds were firebombed. Sikh gurdwaras have been vandalized with Islamophobic and white-supremacist graffiti. The same year, a Sikh man in Northampton had his turban removed in a racist attack on 16 August 2005. In the aftermath of the Charlie Hedbo incident, a British-Sikh dentist named Sarandev Bhambra was attacked by a machete-wielding assailant in Wales, who wanted enact revenge for the killing of Lee Rigby. On 14 May 2016, a football match of Manchester United against Bournemouth at Old Trafford was cancelled due to a bomb-scare, with an image of a Sikh attendant of the match being uploaded to Twitter by an Arsenal fan accusing the Sikh man of being the bomber. In 2020, taxi driver Vaneet Singh was attacked by four white-men and forced to remove his turban in Reading, with the attackers accusing him of being a Taliban member.

In the past, it tended to be Sikh males who were victims of racism, however since the E.U. referendum in 2016, more Sikh women, including those who choose to wear a turban, have also been victims of anti-Sikh racism. However, the narrative on the gendered dimension in anti-Sikh racism is not at the same level as in Islamophobia, where Muslim females wearing burqas or hijabs tend to be targeted.

In 2016, the Network of Sikh Organisations (NSO) and other Sikh bodies lobbied for police forces across England and Wales to report religiously biased hate-crimes in their jurisdictions. Thus, all police forces began to compile this data from 2017 onwards by introducing the "religion" category to hate-crime data. The Home Office admitted it does not know if the increased number of apparent incidents over the years is due to an increased number of hate-crimes or rather better reporting and recording. However, hate-crimes against Sikhs in the UK are still relatively low when compared to the rates for the Jewish and Muslim communities. However, Sikh organizations in the UK have claimed the true number of anti-Sikh hate-crimes is higher than what the official stats show, as some incidents are not reported and therefore not recorded, or incidents that are reported have been categorized incorrectly (i.e. an incident involving a victim of Sikh-heritage not being marked as a religiously biased hate-crime against Sikhs, such as homophobia or racially biased instead of religiously biased) and thus are missed in the total annual tallies of anti-Sikh hate-crimes. The 2016 UK Sikh Survey (published by The Sikh Network, 2016) and A Report into Anti-Sikh Hate Crimes (published by the All-Party Parliamentary Group [APPG] for British Sikhs, October 2020) both claimed that Sikhophobia was a growing issue but that the government was ignoring the problem. Furthermore, the reports argued that anti-Sikh hatred had to be treated as serious as Islamophobia and anti-semitism. However, the 2016 UK Sikh Survey claimed a large percentage and number of British-Sikhs had been victimized in anti-Sikh hate crimes and incidents, some of which have been scrutinized, such as one claim of there being "Over 100,000 hate crimes against Sikhs aged 16 and over in the last 12 months". Yet, the figures released by Sikh bodies are higher than the official crime states released by the British government and police.

Home Office statistics for anti-Sikh hate-crimes:

- April 2017 – March 2018: 117 anti-Sikh hate-crimes out of all the religiously biased hate-crime offences (2%)
- 2018 – 2019: 188 anti-Sikh hate-crimes out of all the religiously biased hate-crime offences (3%)
- 2019 – 2020: 202 anti-Sikh hate-crimes out of all the religiously biased hate-crime offences (3%)
- 2020 – 2021: 112 anti-Sikh hate-crimes out of all the religiously biased hate-crime offences (2%) (Note: Jhutti-Johal explains the decline of anti-Sikh hates crimes in 2020–21 as being due to COVID-19 lockdowns.)
- 2021 – March 2022: 301 anti-Sikh hate-crimes out of all the religiously biased hate-crime offences (4%)

In the UK, there has been a 169% in anti-Sikh attacks in 2021–22 compared to the previous year. Some of these attacks involved the forced removal of turbans worn by Sikhs.

The Sikh Council UK developed a website called Sikh Aware UK to improve the reporting of anti-Sikh hate crimes and incidents, however it was not successful. In January 2022, Sikhguard was set up to encourage Sikhs to report hate crimes and took-over the role that the former website Sikh Aware UK had been set-up for. However, Sikh reporting mechanisms are not as integrated with local police bodies when compared to Muslim (Tell MAMA) and Jewish (CST), which have data-sharing agreements with police departments, leading to increased self-reporting by Muslim and Jewish victims when compared to Sikh ones, alongside more professional advocacy for them.

==== Model minority ====
Sikhs have in recent decades become a "model-minority" in the UK, being viewed as integrating into the pluralistic British identity and having been diligent workers since they began arriving in the country, contributing to Britain through their labour and charity. Also, Sikhs are viewed as successfully using legal means to achieve recognition of their religion, such as with their legal battles with employers and the government to win the right to wear a kara, kirpan, or dastar (turban). There are reports commissioned by the British government expounding on the Sikh community's success, such as the British Sikh Reports or the Contribution of Sikhs to the UK – UK Parliament (House of Commons Library, 2019), and local Sikhs have been elected to public-office. Furthermore, Sikhs are represented in British popular culture, such as in films. In the late 1990s, Sikhs were praised for their contributions to the British military causes during both World Wars.

=== United States ===
Since the early 1900s, Sikhs in America have been victims of racism and prejudice. After the 9/11 terrorist attacks, anti-Sikh hatred has increased but mostly it is fuelled by mistaken identity by those who conflate Sikhs as being Muslims. On 15 September 2001, Balbir Singh Sodhi was murdered after being mistaken for an Arab Muslim. In 2012, a white supremacist committed a massacre at a Sikh temple in Oak Creek, Wisconsin, with six Sikhs being killed. In August 2014, a Sikh man named Sandeep Singh was murdered in New York City after being called a terrorist by being run-over and dragged 30-feet. In 2015 in Chicago, Inderjit Singh Mukker was called a "terrorist" and "Bin Laden" during a racist attack.

Since 2020, there have been a number of attacks on Sikhs in the US, such as four Sikhs who were shot and killed at a FedEx facility in Indianapolis, and a number of individual Sikh men being targeted in separate attacks in 2021. There have been instances of American gurdwaras being vandalized as well.

The Sikh Coalition has lobbied the US government to track hate-crime stats regarding Sikhs, which the FBI began doing so in 2015, however the Sikh body claims the data undercounts the actual amount of hate-crimes against Sikhs and the true number is higher. The Sikh Coalition in the US has developed a website called Report Hate to improve the reporting of anti-Sikh crimes and incidents.

According to FBI stats, hate-crimes against Sikhs have been rising since 2015:

- 2015: six anti-Sikh offences (0.4%) out of all hate-crimes involving religious-bias
- 2016: seven anti-Sikh offences (0.5%) out of all hate-crimes involving religious-bias
- 2017: twenty-four anti-Sikh offences (1.4%) out of all hate-crimes involving religious-bias
- 2018: sixty anti-Sikh offences (4.1%) out of all hate-crimes involving religious-bias (Note: A 200% increase compared to the previous year, making Sikhs the third most victimized religious-group in the US, after Muslims and Jews.)
- 2019: forty-nine anti-Sikh offences (3.0%) out of all hate-crimes involving religious-bias
- 2020: eighty-nine anti-Sikh offences out of all hate-crimes involving religious-bias

=== New Zealand ===
On 20 December 2025, protestors associated with Brian Tamaki and Destiny Church interrupted a Nagar Kirtan procession in Manurewa, South Auckland, New Zealand. Tamaki claimed the Sikhs were "terrorists" and "Khalistanis", complaining about seeing too many turbans and stated that multiculturalism was a "failure".

=== Pakistan ===
In 2010, a Sikh youth Jaspal Singh was beheaded in Khyber Agency after his family could not pay the large Jizya ransom. Consequently, thousands of Sikhs had to abandon their homes and flee from tribal areas to resettle in areas with larger Sikh populations, such as Peshawar, Hassanabdal and Nankana Sahib.

In May 2018, a prominent Sikh leader Charanjeet Singh was shot dead in Peshawar. It was the tenth targeted murder of a prominent Sikh since 2014, and "stirred unprecedented fear - and fury - among the community's members, particularly in Peshawar."

On 3 January 2020, Pakistani media reported that "scores of protesters surrounded the Gurdwara Nankana Sahib, on Friday afternoon, threatening to overrun the holy site if their demands for the release of suspects in an alleged forced conversion case were not met". There were also reports of stone-pelting on the shrine by a mob of angry local Muslims, that even threatened to convert it into a mosque.

On 27 July 2020, it was reported that the Gurdwara Shaheed Bhai Taru Singh, which is the site of martyrdom of Bhai Taru Singh, had been forcibly taken over and was converted into a mosque and named as Masjid Shahid Ganj.

In June 2023, two Sikh shopkeepers were attacked in a spate of less than 48 hours in Peshawar. One Sikh succumbed to his injuries whilst the other victim survived. ISIS claimed responsibility for the attacks and targeted the Sikhs for being "polytheistic".

== Scholarly views ==
Jagbir Jhutti-Johal stresses that instead of blanket-labelling all racist attacks against Sikhs as being "anti-Sikh", it is important to consider the intent of the attacker and if they actually were targeting Sikhs or rather mistook Sikhs for Muslims and intended to target Muslims. Thus, according to them there is a difference between actual anti-Sikh hatred and Islamophobic hatred where Sikhs are victims due to mistaken identity. Jhutti-Johal also criticized official anti-Sikh hate-crime statistics as likely being inaccurate, as many incidents are not reported due to a lack of trust some Sikh communities have in the local police, under-reporting (some Sikhs do not know what a hate-crime or hate-incident is and therefore do not report them), or anti-Sikh crimes are labelled as Islamophobic incidents instead. Furthermore, they argue that the apparent rise in anti-Sikh hate-crimes in stats may be due to increased reporting and awareness due to campaigning by Sikh bodies rather than a genuine increase in the number of anti-Sikh incidents. Furthermore, the official definition of anti-Sikh hate proposed by the APPG for British Sikhs in its 2020 report does not describe incidents where the attacker had Islamophobic motivations but due to mistaken identity, a Sikh was vicitimized by them rather than an actual Muslim. Jhutti-Johal concludes by stating that current systems and mechanisms of reporting do not address the issue of the conflation of race and religion, nor intended/perceived victim (Muslim) and actual victim (Sikh), and also raises the legal complexity of Sikhs being classified as both a race and religion in certain jurisdictions and how it could impact crime-reporting (thus, would an anti-Sikh crime be classified as a race-biased or a religiously biased one, or both at the same time?). Therefore, "anti-Sikh" is a reference to the actual victim (a Sikh) and not to the perceived target (Muslims), thus anti-Sikh hatred may not be proper Sikhophobia, that being actual hatred for Sikhs and being anti-Sikhism, rather it is misdirected Islamophobia.

== See also ==
- Anti-Sikh sentiment in Canada
- Pajeet
