= Kuhestak =

City in Hormozgan province, Iran

Kuhestak Persian: کوهستک
- City
- Location within Iran
- Coordinates: 26°48′14″N 57°01′36″E
- Country: Iran
- Province: Hormozgan
- County: Sirik
- District: Bemani

Population (2016)
  - Total: 3,060
- Time zone: UTC+3:30 (IRST)

Kuhestak (Persian: کوهستک) (Note: Also romanized as Koohastak, Kouhestak, Kūhastak, Kūhestak, and Kūhistak) is a small coastal city in, and the capital of, Bemani District of Sirik County, Hormozgan province, Iran. It also serves as the administrative center for Bemani Rural District. The city has a harbour facing onto the Strait of Hormuz.

== Demographics ==
=== Population ===
At the time of the 2006 National Census, Kuhestak's population was 2,449 in 430 households, when it was a village in Bemani Rural District of the former Byaban District of Minab County. The following census in 2011 counted 2,548 people in 591 households, by which time the district had been separated from the county in the establishment of Sirik County. The rural district was transferred to the new Bemani District. The 2016 census measured the population of the city as 3,060 people in 746 households, when Kuhestak had been elevated to the status of a city.

== History ==
=== IRGC Navy ===
In 1986 the Islamic Revolutionary Guard Corps Navy deployed HY-2 Silkworm cruse missiles near Kuhestak. By 2009, the Iranian Navy had Hudong fast missile-carrying boats equipped with Silkworm missiles based in Kuhestak. By 2014, the Kuhestak Missile Battery, with missile facilities and engaging in missile technical design and engineering, was located in Kuhestak.

=== 2026 wedding attack ===
On 1 September 2026, amidst the 2026 Iran war, the United States military allegedly launched an airstrike on a home in the area hosting a wedding party. Five people were killed and over 60 injured.
