= Naulakha Bazaar =

Naulakha Bazaar نولکھا بازار
- Bazaar
- Country: Pakistan
- Province: Punjab
- District: Lahore District

Languages
  - Official: Punjabi
- Time zone: UTC+5:00 (PST)

Naulakha Bazaar (Punjabi, Urdu: نولکھا بازار) is a bazaar located in Lahore, Punjab, Pakistan. The bazaar is located east of the old Walled City. The Shahidganj square is located in the bazaar.

== Etymology ==
The name Naulakha likely derived from the cost of the palace (nine hundred thousand rupees) originally constructed at the site.

== History ==
In the early 16th century, prince Mirza Kamran built a garden and palace in what is now the Naulakha Bazaar. This was further expanded and developed by Asaf Khan and Dara Shikoh. The bazaar was established in 1633 and is located in Lahore Fort near Naulakha Pavilion. The Shaheed Ganj Mosque is located in Naulakha Bazaar. The used clothing and crockery bazaar, landa bazaar, is also located near Naulakha Bazaar. When the Naulakha Pavilion was built in 1633 by the Mughal emperor Shah Jahan as a small summer house, it cost around 900,000 rupees, an exorbitant amount at the time. It is called Naulakha because in Punjabi language, the word means 'worth 9 lakhs rupees'. This also brought the word Naulakha into common use to signify something precious.

During the Sikh-era, the word nakhas (from the Persian word nakhkhas) referred to a place where captives, horses and cattle taken as booty were sold. There was the Shaheed Ganj section with a bazaar west of which were many residences, mosques, and a courtyard that had vessels of bhang. The city of Lahore began expanding past its old walled-city during the British-era due to demographic pressure, with this encroachment eventually reaching the locality of Naulakha Bazaar, with this urbanization being encouraged by the establishment of a railway station at Naulakha in 1864.

After the Babri Masjid incident in 1992, a group attacked the Moolchand Mandir in Naulakha Bazaar and destroyed its murti. The site is being redeveloped in the present-day, with parts of its heritage and history being lost. Some areas are abandoned and dilapidated.

== Location ==
The area starts from Zafar Shaheed Chowk, Railway Road and ends at Delhi Gate. There are three sub-sections:

- Naulakha Bazaar proper: extends from the Zafar Shaheed to Shaheed Ganj Chowk
- Loha Bazaar from Zafar Shaheed Chowk to Shaheed Ganj Chowk
- Landa Bazaar from Shaheed Ganj Chowk to Delhi Gate

Within Naulakha Bazaar are famous landmarks, such as Sarai Mian Sultan, Hazrat Shah Kaku Chishti Mausoleum, Gurdwara Shaheed Ganj, Gurdwara Bhai Taru Singh, Moolchand Mandir, Naulakha Church, and Government Technical College (GCT), Lahore.

== Economy ==
Over 180 shops can be found in the area, specializing in electronics, textiles and clothing, walking sticks, mosquito nets, canvas sheets (tarpal), bags, travel trolleys, chadars, and other items.Fashion designing is a part of Landa Bazaar's economy.

== See also ==
- Badshahi Mosque
- Bazaar
- History of marketing
- Lahore Fort
- Market (place)
- Naulakha Pavilion
- Retail
- Shalimar Gardens
- Shaheed Ganj Mosque
- Walled City of Lahore
