= Karpan (surname) =

Karpan is a surname. Notable people with the surname include:

- Kathy Karpan (1942–2025), American politician from Wyoming
- Martín Karpan (born 1974), Argentine-Colombian actor
- Vaughn Karpan (born 1961), Canadian ice hockey player
