= Henry Norlande Ruttan =

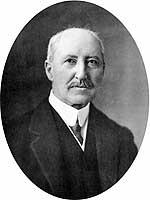
- Henry Norlande Ruttan
- Born: May 21, 1848; Cobourg, Canada West
- Died: October 13, 1925 (aged 77); Armstrong's Point, Winnipeg, Manitoba, Canada
- Relatives: Henry Ruttan (grandfather); James Farrand Ruttan (brother)
- Military career
- Rank: Brigadier General
- Awards: Canada General Service Medal

Brigadier General Henry Norlande Ruttan (May 21, 1848 – October 13, 1925) was a Canadian engineer and Canadian Army Officer. In 1885, he became the first city engineer of Winnipeg, remaining in office until his retirement in 1914.

== Career ==
Ruttan served as a survey engineer to Sir Sandford Fleming. He was Winnipeg's city engineer for many years. Of Ruttan's many engineering projects, the James Avenue Pumping Station (1906), was considered the most modern such institution in the world.

A charter member of the Canadian Society for Civil Engineering, he served as president in 1910. In addition to the Canadian Society of Civil Engineering, he belonged to several other professional organizations, including Institution of Civil Engineers, American Society of Civil Engineers, and Royal Society for the encouragement of Arts, Manufactures & Commerce.

A recipient of the Canada General Service Medal, he was promoted to the rank of brigadier general in 1912.

== Personal life ==
Ruttan was born in Cobourg, Ontario, in 1848 to Henry Jones Ruttan and Margaret Pringle. He was a descendant of United Empire Loyalists, as was his wife, Andrina Barberie of Dalhousie, New Brunswick, whom he married in 1882. They had nine children, of whom four sons and two daughters survived infancy including Mary Louise Ruttan (b. 1877), Arthur Charles Ruttan, Col. Charles Millidge Ruttan (d. 1970), Henry Andrew Ruttan (1881–1958 – father of Susan), Francis Norlande Ruttan (born 1885), and J. D. Ruttan (born 1888). Ruttan's paternal grandfather, Henry Ruttan, was Speaker of the Legislative Assembly of Upper Canada.

Ruttan belonged to several social clubs, including Manitoba Club, Carlton Club, St. Charles Country Club, and the Winnipeg Automobile Club. He was a Mason, a member of the AF & AM, and he attended the Anglican church.

He died at his home in Armstrong's Point, Winnipeg, Manitoba, in 1925.
