= Bandar Sirik =

City in Hormozgan province, Iran

Bandar Sirik بندر سیریک
- City
- Location within Iran
- Coordinates: 26°30′59″N 57°06′06″E
- Country: Iran
- Province: Hormozgan
- County: Sirik
- District: Central

Population (2016)
  - Total: 5,137
- Time zone: UTC+3:30 (IRST)
- Bandar-e Sirik Lighthouse
- Markings: Red (daymark)
- Focal height: 38 m (125 ft)
- Range: 28 nmi (52 km; 32 mi)
- Characteristic: Fl(3) W 20s

Bandar Sirik (Persian: بندر سیریک) (Note: Also known as Sirik, also romanized as Sīrīk; and Sirik-e Kohneh (سيريك کهنه), also romanized as Sīrīk-e Kohneh; formerly the village of Biyaban) is a city in the Central District of Sirik County, Hormozgan province, Iran, serving as capital of both the county and the district. It is also the administrative center for Sirik Rural District.

== Demographics ==
=== Population ===
At the time of the 2006 National Census, the city's population was 3,640 in 640 households, when it was capital of the former Biyaban District of Minab County. The following census in 2011 counted 4,140 people in 920 households, by which time the district had been separated from the county in the establishment of Sirik County. Bandar Sirik was transferred to the new Central District as the county's capital. The 2016 census measured the population of the city as 5,137 people in 1,182 households.

=== Language ===
The linguistic composition of the city:

Sirik linguistic composition
Language	percent
Balochi	90%
Bandari Farsi	10%

== Overview ==
Bandar Sirik overlooks the Strait of Hormuz and contains a small harbour to the northwest of the main settlement. The Minab River empties into the sea near Sirik, and a mangrove estuary is located here. To the northwest along the coast to Bandar-e-Abbas, there are thousands of hidden caves and valleys dotted around the horn of the Strait of Hormuz.

In 2021, the Iranian Revolutionary Guards opened a naval base in Sirik. Its avowed goal was to exercise “full control” of the Strait.

== Sirik Under Attack ==
According to IRNA, (during 2026 Iran war) the CEO of the Hormozgan Water and Wastewater Company stated that following a US attack in the early hours of Wednesday, June 10, 2026, on water supply facilities in Sirik County, the supply of drinking water to the city of Kohestak and ten villages in the Bamani District was completely cut off.

== See also ==
- List of lighthouses in Iran
