= James Farrand Ruttan =

Canadian politician (1850-1904)

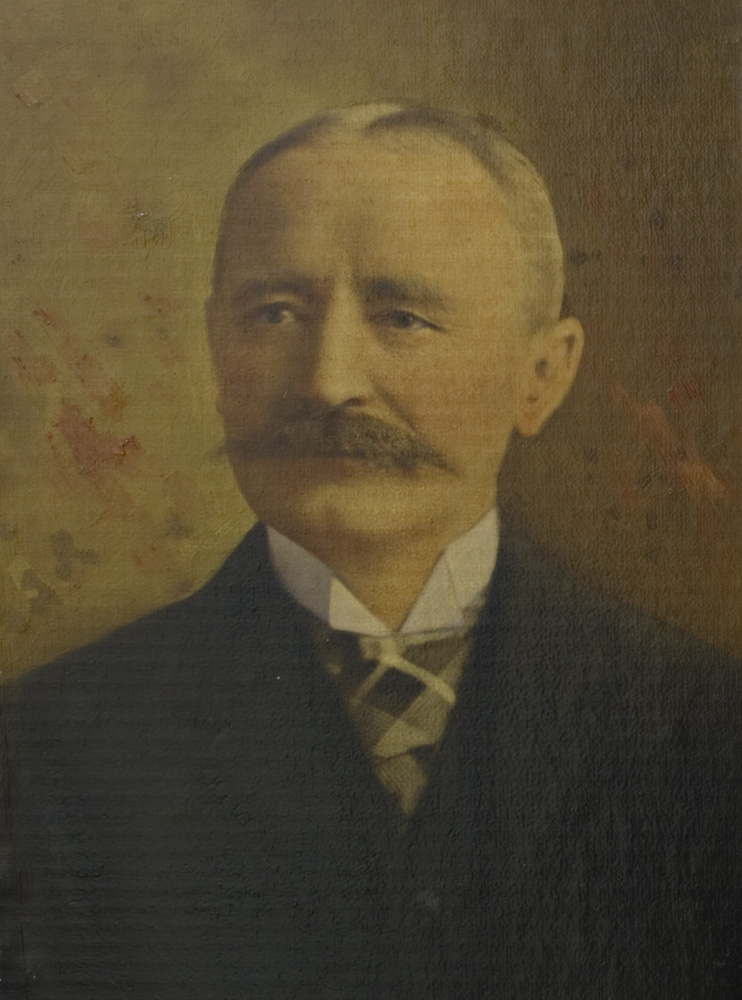
Ruttan in 1892

James Farrand Ruttan (March 10, 1850 – January 21, 1904) was a real estate agent and politician in Ontario. He was mayor of Port Arthur from 1891 to 1892.

He was born in Cobourg, the son of Henry Jones Ruttan, who was the son of Henry Ruttan, and Margaret Pringle. Ruttan began work with the Post Office in Ottawa, later becoming involved in railway construction. In 1882, he opened a real estate office in Port Arthur, settling there the following year. Ruttan became real estate agent for the McVicar family, a large land-holder in the area. This brought him into conflict with the Canadian Pacific Railway, who required land to build a railway station. Rutton served on the town council in 1884, 1888 and 1889. From 1889 to 1903, he was Crown Lands agent for the Thunder Bay District.

Ruttan died of pneumonia in Port Arthur at the age of 53. Farrand Street and Ruttan Street in Thunder Bay were named in his honour.

His brother Henry Norlande served as Winnipeg's first city engineer.
