= Mahdi Bemani Naeini =

مهدی بمانی نائینی Mehdi Bemani Naeini
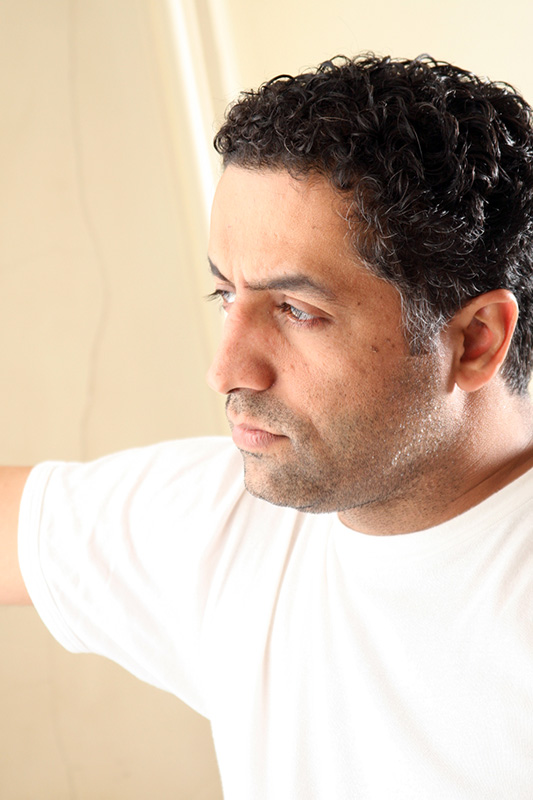
- Mahdi Bemani in 2006
- Born: Mahdi Bemani Naeini; November 3, 1968 (age 57); Mashad, Khorasan, Iran
- Years active: 1984 - present
- Children: Abtin

Mahdi Bemani Naeini (also spelt Mehdi Bemani, Mehdi Bemani Naeini, Persian: مهدی بمانی نائینی, born November 3, 1968) is an Iranian film director, cinematographer, TV news producer and photographer.

== Early life ==
Bemani was born into an Iranian middle-class family in Mashad on November 3, 1968. For the first time he touched camera at the age of ten when he developed and printed his first photos personally in his home made atelier. Throughout his early teens, Mahdi Bemani made amateur 8 mm movies with his family and friends. His films widely intended and presented in domestic and international film festivals and by the time he was 17, he gained many national and international prizes. He graduated from IYCS, Iranian Young Cinema Society in 1984 where he experienced film making and photography systematically.

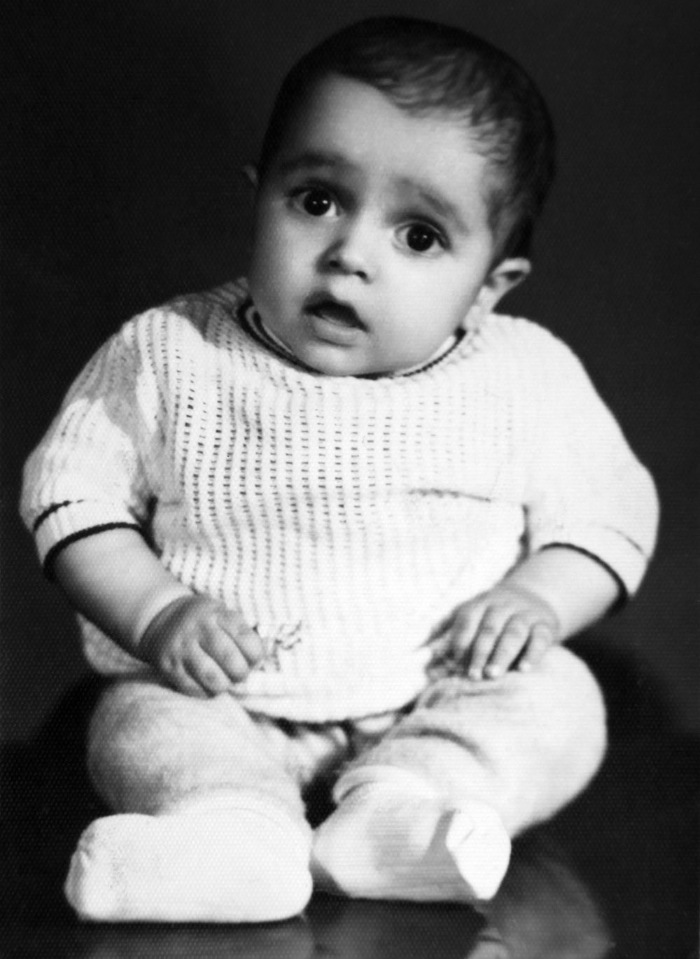
Mahdi Bemani (1969)

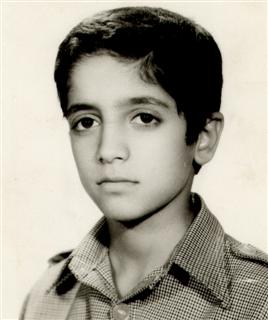
Mahdi Bemani (1978)

== Career ==
Independent producer and filmmaker.

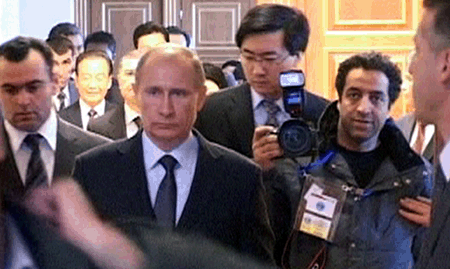
Mahdi Bemani Naeini during Shanghai Cooperation Organization Summit in Dushanbe, Tajikistan (2010)

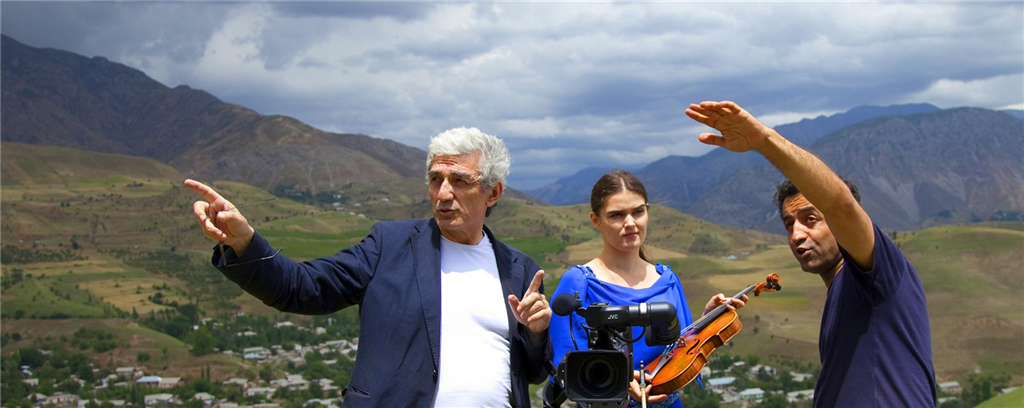
Director Mahdi Bemani Naeini and Composer Tolib Shakhidi during filming of the "Vivaldi Azalia" music video (2010)

== Awards ==
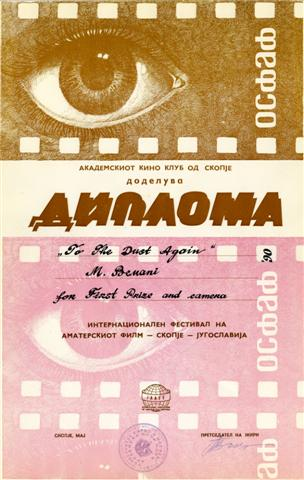
Diploma and first prize for the film "To the dust again" from Skopje International film festival, Yugoslavia (1990).

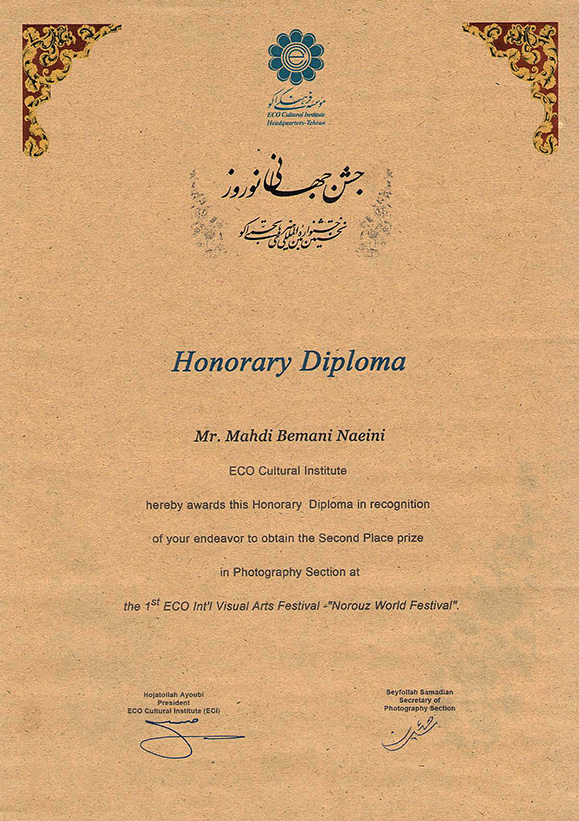
ECO Cultural InstituteThe Second Place Prizein Photography Section at The 1st ECO int'l Visual Arts Festival-"Nowruz World Festival".

== Filmography ==
- Hazrate Amirjon (Mir Sayyid Ali Hamadani) (2015), documentary film
- EID-AL-ADHA in Tajikistan (2015), documentary film
- Gour Ghooli Epic (2015), documentary film
- Nowrouz in Tajikistan (2014), documentary film
- Maria (2012), documentary film
- Bashara Mausoleum (2010), documentary film.
- Vivaldi Azalia (2010), music video
- Beads of Memories (2010), documentary film.
- Maroon Town in Dushanbe (2009), documentary film.
- Documents of a letter (2008), documentary film.
- Breeze of Moulian River (2008), documentary film.
- My prospect (2007), music video.
- Kindness (2007), music video.
- Rumi's dance (2007), music video.
- Time contrast (2006), documentary film.
- Re-reading (2005), documentary film.
- Un Amore Grande (2005, Language: Italian), music video.
- City of God (2004), music video.
- Pendulum (2002)
- One Two Three (2002), animation.
- One day for all (2001), animation.
- Straggle (2001), animation.
- Cross Country (2000), animation.
- Holiday (1998), documentary film.
- Nowruz (1998), documentary film.
- Smell of Wheat (1993), documentary film.
- Statue (1993), documentary film.
- Dream (1992)
- Those days (1991)
- To the dust again (1988)
- Teacher's lesson (1985)
- Silence (1985)
- Ascent (1984)
