= Henry Ruttan =

Canadian politician

Henry Ruttan (June 12, 1792 – July 31, 1871) was a businessman, inventor and politician figure in Upper Canada.

He was born in Adolphustown in 1792 to William Ruttan and Margaret Steele. The Ruttans were United Empire Loyalists from New York and descendants of French Huguenots who fled to America via England and Holland. At the age of 14, he left school to work in a store in Kingston. He served in the militia (1st Battalion of Northumberland Militia) during the War of 1812. After the war, he remained in the militia and reached the rank of colonel with the 3rd Battalion of Northumberland. He left the militia in 1846 but was called back into service from 1860 to 1862 with the 4th Military District. He set up a business in Cobourg in 1815. In 1820, he was elected to the Legislative Assembly of Upper Canada for Northumberland; he served until 1824 and was reelected in 1836. During his second term, 1836–40, he was influential in having the Trent Canal started. He served as speaker of the house from December 1837 to January 1838. In 1827, he was named sheriff for the Newcastle District; he continued to serve after the district was replaced by the United Counties of Northumberland and Durham in 1849.

Ruttan designed more efficient heating and ventilation equipment for buildings and also invented a system for heating and cooling railway coaches that was put to use by several railway companies in North America.

He died in Cobourg in 1871.

His grandson, Henry Norlande Ruttan, worked as an engineer with several railway companies and served as city engineer for the city of Winnipeg. His other grandson, James Farrand Ruttan, was the mayor of Port Arthur from 1891 to 1892.

Preceded by Allan McNab	Speaker of the Legislative Assembly of Upper Canada; 1837	Succeeded by post abolished
