= Charles Edwin Ruttan =

Lieutenant Charles Edwin Ruttan U.S.N.R.F.
- Born: 21 August 1884; Ottawa, Ontario, Canada
- Died: 6 November 1939 (aged 55); Hollywood, Los Angeles, California
- Notable work: "A Wonderful Opportunity for You" (1917)
- Style: Oil painting

Charles Edwin Ruttan, known professionally as Charles E. Ruttan, (1884–1939) was a Canadian-born painter. He served in the United States Naval Reserve Force as a pilot lieutenant during World War I. Because of his background with painting aerial combat scenes, Ruttan was put in charge of pictorial records of trans-Atlantic flights for the United States Navy. One of his most well-known works is the World War I poster titled "A Wonderful Opportunity for You".

== Personal life ==
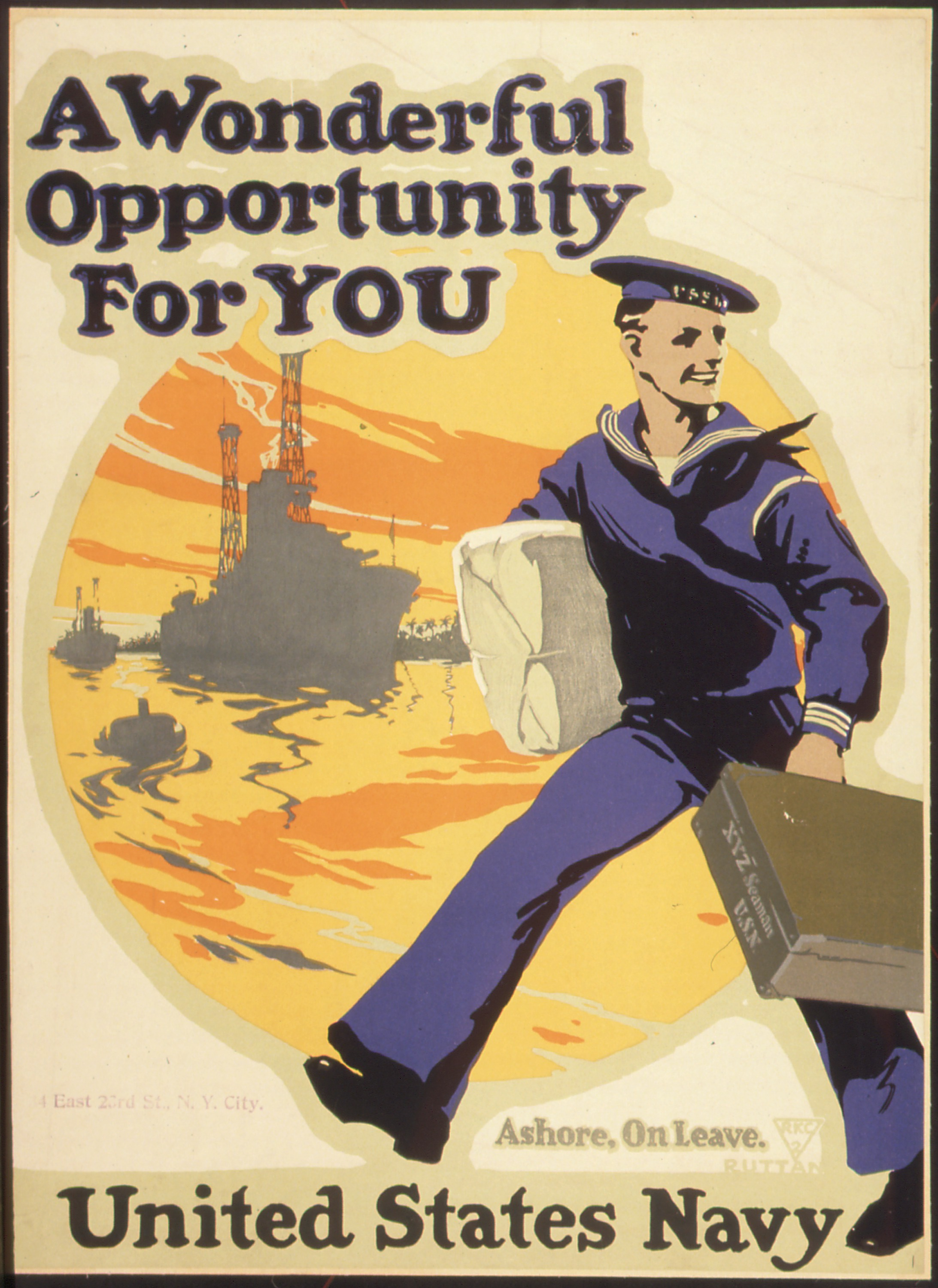
"Wonderful Opportunity For You". WWI poster illustrated by Ruttan

Ruttan was born on 21 August 1884, in Ottawa, Ontario, Canada, to Thomas David Ruttan (1851-1918) and Martha A. Duetta (1853-1924). He had three siblings: William, Alfred Arthur and a sister.

On 1 June 1905, Ruttan married Della Elvira Brown. They had two children.

Ruttan died on 6 November 1939, in Hollywood.

== Career ==
Ruttan designed advertisements for various products and companies such as Post Toasties, Procter & Gamble and Pompeian Cream. He also illustrated a Cream of Wheat advertisement that was displayed in trolleys and train cars.

Reported on March 11, 1916, Ruttan resigned from the Street Railways Advertising Company in New York City and opened a private art studio. He had been chief artist and manager at Street Railways for many years, but decided to open the studio to "devote his time to [the] promotion of a higher art for commercial purposes".

On June 23, 1916, Ruttan entered the Naval Militia. His ranking in the United States Navy Reserve was lieutenant. Ruttan, a qualified pilot, was temporarily assigned to the U.S.S. Melville, which was a supply and repair ship for seaplanes at Ponta Delgada. Here, Ruttan was designated by the Navy Department as the official artist of the flight. His experience with painting naval aviation scenes on the Western Front secured him the position. His paintings were compiled for the U.S. Navy Department historical archives. They depicted scenes of bombing raids at Zeebrugge, Paris and other locations. In 1918, he was stationed at the U.S. Coastal Air Station at Montauk, New York.

After the war, Ruttan illustrated a series of paintings which depicted the first successful crossing of the Atlantic by a flight of Navy Curtiss NC seaplanes.

Ruttan exhibited his aeronautical paintings for the first time at the Second Pan-American Aeronautic Convention on the Steel Pier in Atlantic City, New Jersey. He also loaned his paintings to be shown in the club rooms of the Aero Club of America. In 1918, he showed his aerial paintings at the Treasure and Trinket Drive. In the same year, he gave his paintings to the Aviation Committee for them to use in propaganda work for the Treasure and Trinket Fund.

In 1917, Ruttan's World War I poster for the U.S. Navy was released. It showed a man in uniform walking with suitcases in his hands. Behind him is a ship surrounded in yellow and orange light. The poster reads, "A wonderful opportunity for YOU. United States Navy." The message conveyed was that by joining military service, young men were able to travel the world and gain experiences they would not have had before.

In 1919, Ruttan moved to Los Angeles and worked in Hollywood as a painter and artist.

He was a member of the Aero Club of America, of which he was elected a member in 1918. In April the same year, he was elected a member of the Air Service Institute.
