= Gurdwara Shaheed Bhai Taru Singh =

Sikh temple in Lahore, Pakistan

Gurudwara Shaheed Bhai Taru Singh
- Interactive map of the Gurudwara Shaheed Bhai Taru Singh area

General information
- Architectural style: Sikh architecture
- Location: Naulakha Bazaar, Lahore, Punjab, Pakistan
- Coordinates: 31°34′44″N 74°19′55″E
- Construction started: 1747
- Completed: 1748

Gurdwara Shaheed Bhai Taru Singh (Punjabi and Urdu: گوردوارہ شہید بھائی تارو سنگھ) or Gurdwara Shahidi Asthan Bhai Taru Singh ji is a Sikh Gurdwara at Naulakha Bazaar in Lahore, Pakistan, which commemorates the spot where Bhai Taru Singh was executed. The shrine was built on the grounds of the Shaheed Ganj Mosque, leading to a legal dispute over ownership that began in 1850. British, and later Pakistani, courts upheld the right of Sikhs to maintain a place of worship at the site. While a settlement was being negotiated by British authorities, a group of Sikhs demolished the mosque on 7–8 July 1935, triggering communal riots. In December 2022, Pakistan’s Evacuee Trust Property Board closed it to the public. Located opposite to the gurdwara is Gurdwara Shahid Ganj.

== Location ==
The gurdwara is located at Shahidganj, Naulakha Bazaar, Lahore, near Gurdwara Shahid Ganj.

== History ==
The gurdwara was built on the grounds of the Shaheed Ganj Mosque, which was dedicated in 1722 by Falak Beg Khan. The mosque was built on the premises of the shrine to the Sufi saint Pir Shah Kaku. After Sikh rule began in Lahore in 1762 under the Bhangi Misl, Muslims were forbidden from entering the site, and a small new gurdwara to commemorate the execution site of Bhai Taru Singh was built next to the mosque building and shrine of Pir Shah Kaku. Sikhs did not demolish the mosque immediately, but instead used it as the residence of the granthi priest of the gurdwara. Muslims began to petition British courts for ownership of the site, after the Sikh Empire was defeated in 1849.

=== Disputes ===
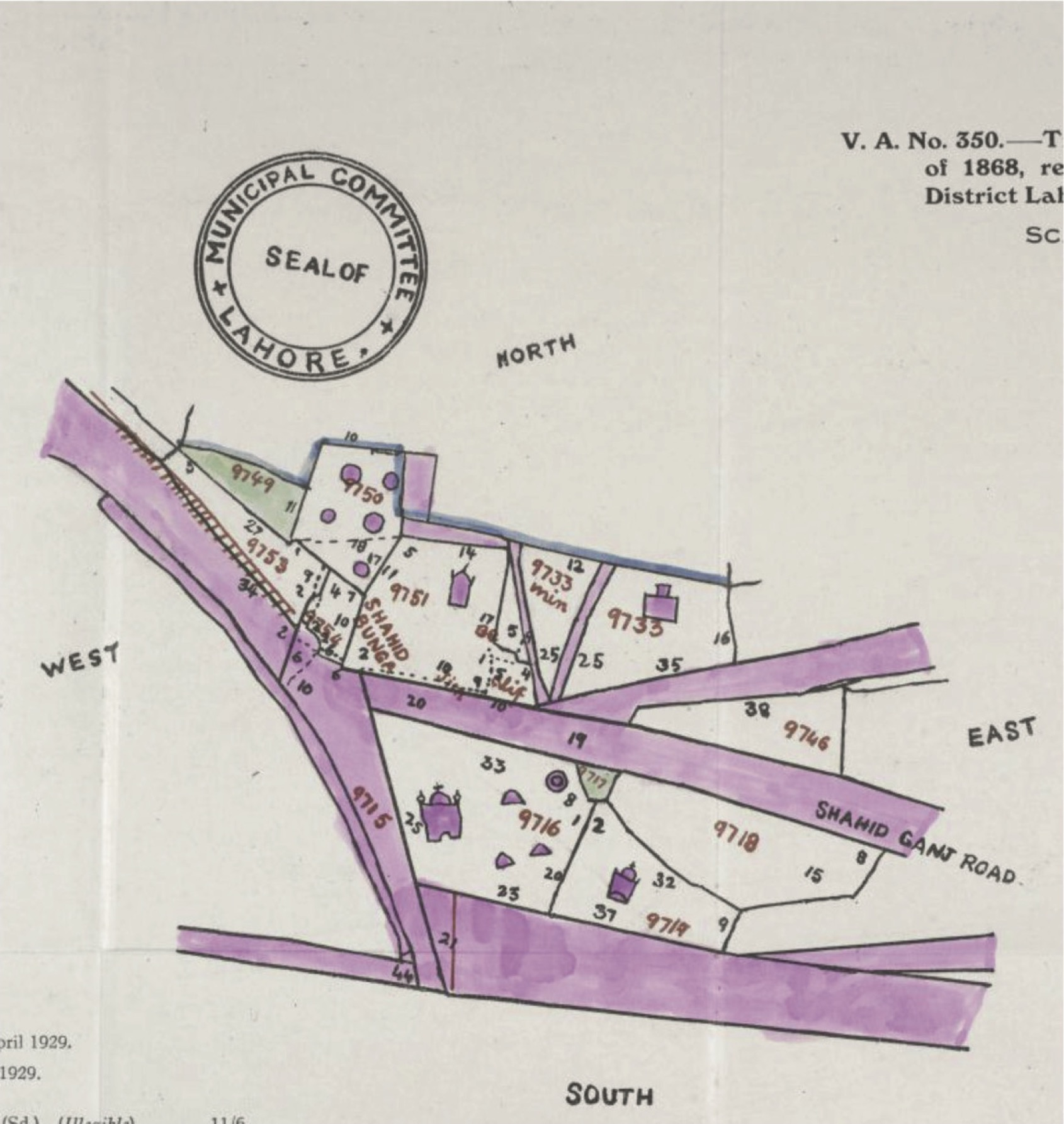
Custodianship of Shahidganj in colonial Lahore - Translation of a Tracing of Portion of a Shajara of 1868

Shortly after the commencement of British rule in 1849, the first petitions for retrieval of the mosque were made by Nur Ahmad in 1849. British authorities cited the existence of the Bhai Taru Singh shrine as reason for maintaining the status quo, and Sikhs were allowed to continue worshipping at the site. The entire site was handed to the Sikh community on 22 December 1927 by British authorities. Another appeal against Sikh ownership by the secretary of Anjuman-e-Islam, Syed Mohsin Shah, was rejected in 1934, and the mosque demolished on 8 July 1935, while negotiations with Muslims were ongoing. The act triggered communal riots in Lahore. In 1938, another appeal against Sikh occupation of the site was rejected. Fazl-i-Hussain, Prime Minister of Punjab under British rule, advised Muslims to give up claims to the site, and believed communal agitation would harm the cause of the pro-British Unionists.

After independence, the Sikh temple was abandoned and came under the control of the Pakistani government. Another appeal in 1950 to reclaim the land for Muslims was rejected, and Muslims were barred from converting the site into a mosque. Another appeal in the 1980s was also rejected. The site was handed back to the Sikh community by General Muhammad Zia-ul-Haq. A new and larger gurdwara building was built on the grounds of Gurdwara Bhai Taru Singh in 2004.

==== July 2011 ====
Every July, Sikhs conducted religious ceremonies at the site. However, in July 2011, a group of Sikh musicians were removed from the gurdwara by the Dawat-e-Islami and barred from entering. The same year, Muslims offered Eid-ul-Fitr prayers at the site. Since then, the gurdwara has remained closed to Sikhs.

On 16 July 2011, Sikhs were not allowed to pray at Gurdwara by Muslims because of the holy day Shab e-Barat while the martyrdom anniversary of Bhai Taru Singh also fell on the same day. Since 2012, the Market committee of Naulakha Bazaar led by Sohail Butt group has allegedly encroached upon more than 90% land of Gurdwara Shaheed Bhai Taru Singh by constructing a Mazar shrine inside the Gurdwara complex, and separated the Gurdwara by cloth partition leaving 18 to 20 square yard of land out of original 600 square yard land.

==== July 2020 ====
In July 2020, a cleric and shopkeeper named Sohail Butt claimed in a video the land belonged to the shrine of the Shah Kaku and to the previous mosque. He also alleged that Gopal Chawla, the former chief of Pakistan Gurudwara Prabandhak Committee, had threatened to occupy the shrine of Pir Shah Kaku without proof of ownership of the site. Butt in 2012 had been accused of leading efforts to encroach upon land allocated to the gurdwara.

After Butt's threats, some Indian newspapers reported that Pakistan planned to convert the gurdwara into a mosque. The Chief Minister of the Indian state of Punjab, Amarinder Singh, condemned what he called an "attempt" to convert the shrine into a mosque. The Government of India's Ministry of External Affairs on 27 July 2020 lodged a protest with the Pakistani High Commission "over reports of attempts being made to convert" the shrine into a mosque. Pakistan Sikh Gurdwara Prabandhak Committee demanded strict action against Suhail Butt.

== Significance ==
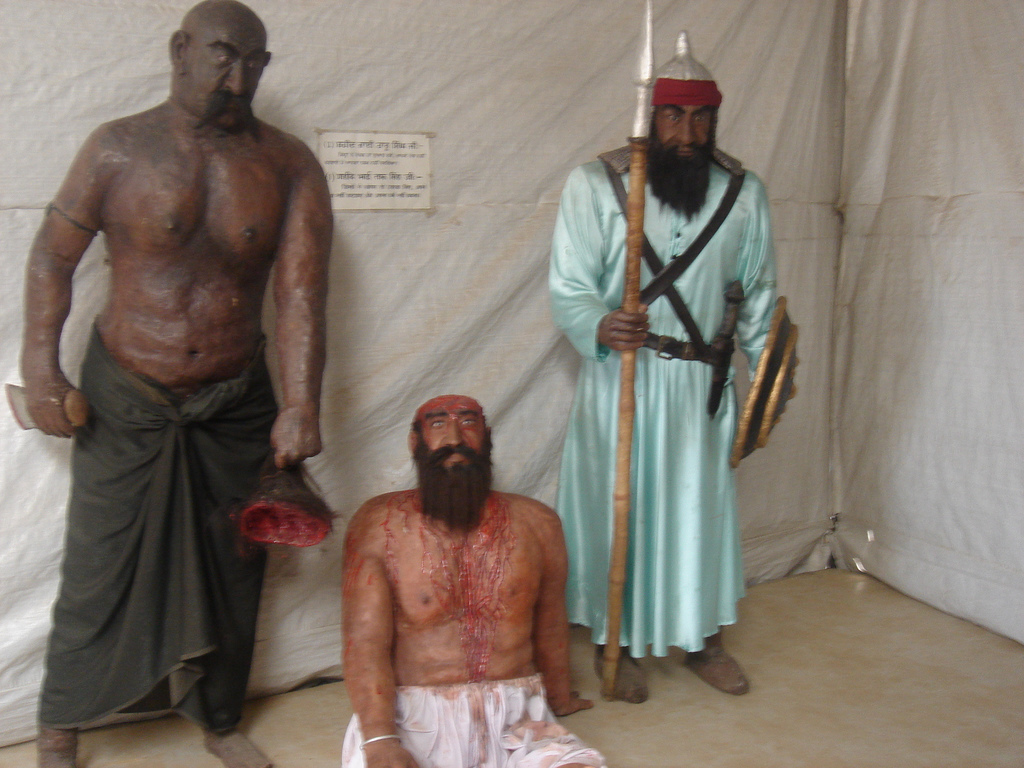
A diorama of Bhai Taru Singh being executed at the site

The shrine ("shaheedi asthan") is believed to be situated at the place where Bhai Taru Singh was executed in 1745 by Zakariya Khan when he had his head scalped rather than cutting his hair or converting to Islam. According to Sikh sources, after cutting Bhai Taru Singh's scalp Zakaria Khan was stricken with unbearable pain and the inability to urinate. As a last resort, Khan sent an apology to the Khalsa Panth for his persecution of Sikhs and begged for forgiveness. It was suggested that if Khan hit himself with Bhai Taru Singh's shoes his condition might be lifted. Although hitting himself with Bhai Taru Singh's shoe did cure the Khan's condition, he died 22 days later from having hit himself with the shoes, which is what Bhai Taru Singh had predicted. Upon hearing the death of Khan and that he had outlived him, Taru Singh also died on 1 July 1745.

== See also ==
- Bhai Taru Singh
- Gurdwara Lal Khoohi, a formerly Sikh shrine in Lahore repurposed to a Muslim one after Partition
- Pakistan Sikh Gurdwara Prabandhak Committee
- Sikhism in Pakistan
