= Routan =

Routan may refer to:

- Routan Islands, a group of two islands in Chukotka, Russia in the Chaunskaya Bay
- Volkswagen Routan, a 2008–2013 German-American minivan
