= Shahmoradi =

Shahmoradi شهمرادي
- Village
- Location within Iran
- Coordinates: 27°10′33″N 57°02′55″E
- Country: Iran
- Province: Hormozgan
- County: Minab
- Bakhsh: Central
- Rural District: Howmeh

Population (2006)
  - Total: 712
- Time zone: UTC+3:30 (IRST)
  - Summer (DST): UTC+4:30 (IRDT)

Shahmoradi (Persian: شهمرادي, also Romanized as Shahmorādī and Shahmaradī, and Shāh Mardī) is a village in Howmeh Rural District, in the Central District of Minab County, Hormozgan Province, Iran. At the 2006 census, its population was 712, in 148 families.
