= Bemani District =

District in Hormozgan province, Iran

Bemani District Persian: بخش بمانی
- District
- Location within Iran
- Coordinates: 26°48′40″N 57°06′51″E
- Country: Iran
- Province: Hormozgan
- County: Sirik
- Capital: Kuhestak

Population (2016)
  - Total: 14,173
- Time zone: UTC+3:30 (IRST)

Bemani District (Persian: بخش بمانی) is in Sirik County, Hormozgan province, Iran. Its capital is the city of Kuhestak.

== History ==
After the 2006 National Census, Biyaban District was separated from Minab County in the establishment of Sirik County, which was divided into two districts of two rural districts each, with Bandar Sirik as its capital and only city at the time. After the 2011 census, the village of Kuhestak was elevated to the status of a city.

== Demographics ==
=== Population ===
At the time of the 2011 census, the district's population was 12,987 people in 2,948 households. The 2016 census measured the population of the district as 14,173 inhabitants in 3,673 households.

=== Administrative divisions ===
Bemani District Population
Administrative Divisions	2011	2016
Bemani RD	7,702	5,565
Shahmardi RD	5,285	5,548
Kuhestak (city)		3,060
Total	12,987	14,173
RD = Rural District

== Under Attack ==
During 2026 Iran war, the CEO of the Hormozgan Water and Wastewater Company stated that following a US attack in the early hours of Wednesday, June 10, 2026, on water supply facilities in Sirik County, the supply of drinking water to the city of Kohestak and ten villages in the "Bamani District" was completely cut off.
