= Central District (Sirik County) =

District in Hormozgan province, Iran

Central District (Sirik County) Persian: بخش مرکزی شهرستان سیریک
- District
- Location within Iran
- Coordinates: 26°24′19″N 57°16′45″E
- Country: Iran
- Province: Hormozgan
- County: Bandar Sirik
- Capital: Sirik

Population (2016)
  - Total: 31,550
- Time zone: UTC+3:30 (IRST)

The Central District of Sirik County (Persian: بخش مرکزی شهرستان سیریک) is in Hormozgan province, Iran. Its capital is the city of Bandar Sirik. (Note: Formerly the village of Biyaban)

== History ==
After the 2006 National Census, Biyaban District was separated from Minab County in the establishment of Sirik County, which was divided into two districts of two rural districts each, with Bandar Sirik as its capital and only city at the time. After the 2011 census, the village of Garuk was elevated to the status of a city.

== Demographics ==
=== Population ===
At the time of the 2011 census, the district's population was 30,198 people in 6,355 households. The 2016 census measured the population of the district as 31,550 inhabitants in 7,631 households.

=== Administrative divisions ===
Central District (Sirik County) Population
Administrative Divisions	2011	2016
Biyaban RD	13,160	13,559
Sirik RD	12,898	8,846
Bandar Sirik (city)	4,140	5,137
Garuk (city)		4,008
Total	30,198	31,550
RD = Rural District
