= Shaheed Ganj Mosque =

Mosque in Lahore, Punjab, Pakistan

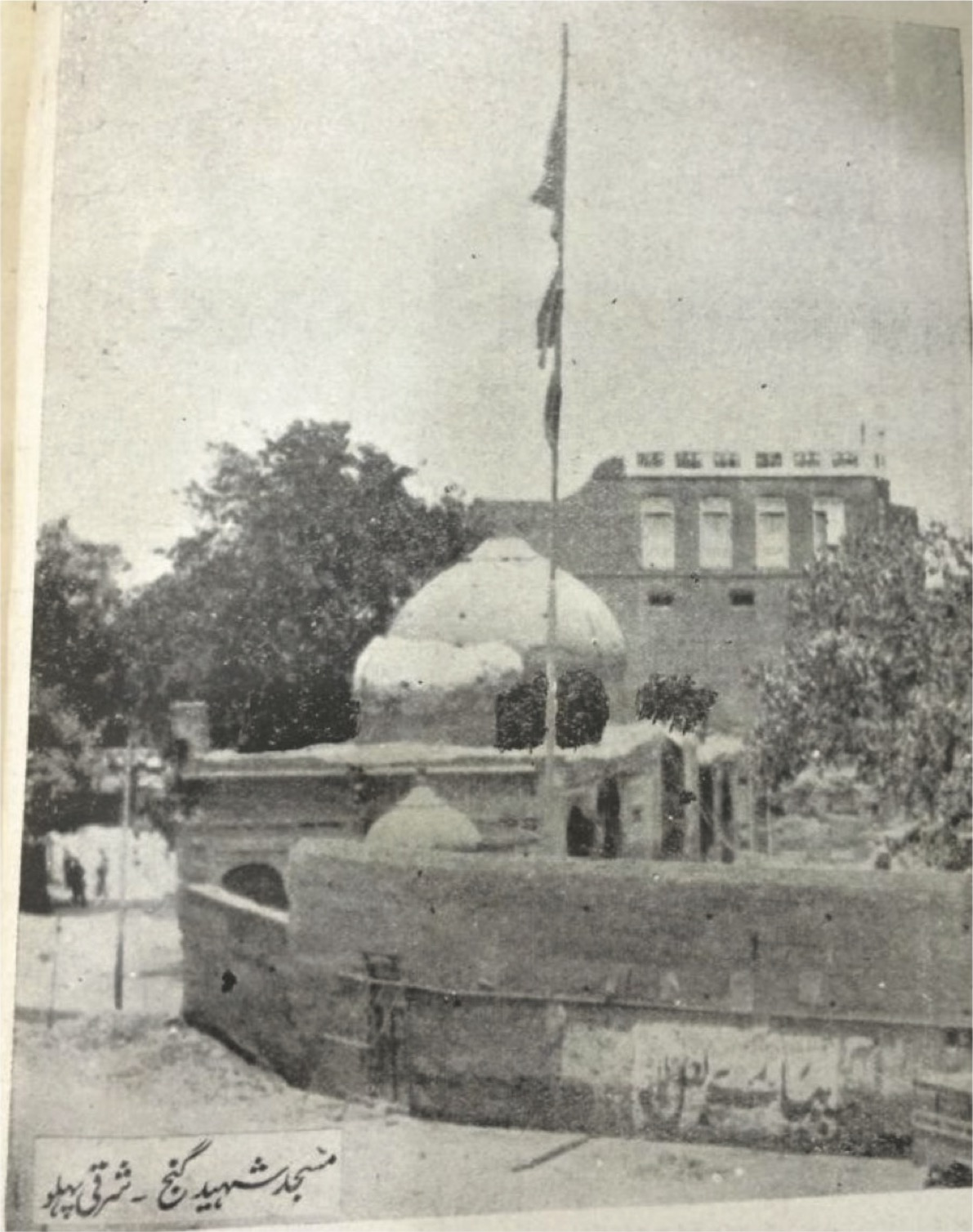
- Photograph of the eastern aspect of Masjid Shahidganj, c. 1930s

- Location of the mosque in Lahore

Religion
- Affiliation: Islam (former)
- Ecclesiastical or organizational status: Mosque (1753–1935)
- Status: Demolished

Location
- Location: Lahore, Punjab
- Country: Pakistan
- Interactive map of Shaheed Ganj Mosque

Architecture
- Type: Mosque architecture
- Style: Indo-Islamic
- Creator: Abdullah Khan
- Completed: 1134 AH (1721/1722 CE)
- Demolished: 8 July 1935

Specifications
- Dome: Three
- Minaret: Three

The Shaheed Ganj Mosque, originally named the Abdullah Khan Mosque (Urdu: مسجد شَهيد گنج), is a former mosque, since demolished, that was located in Lahore, Punjab, Pakistan. The mosque was commissioned in 1722 during the reign of Mughal Emperor Muhammad Shah and built by Abdullah Khan. Construction was completed in 1753 during the reign of Ahmad Shah Bahadur. It was constructed next to the shrine of Pir Shah Kaku. Sikh rule began in 1762 and the Gurdwara Bhai Taru Singh was built afterwards within the same grounds. The mosque site was under dispute during British rule, and was demolished by Sikhs on 8 July 1935.

== History ==
The Abdullah Khan Mosque was built by Abdullah Khan during the reign of Mughal Emperor Muhammad Shah. Khan was a cook of Prince Dara Shikoh, the elder son of Shah Jahan, and in 1743 CE, rose up to the position of kotwal (Chief police officer) of Lahor] for his services. The mosque was completed in 1134 AH (1721/1722 CE) by the Falak Beg Khan, and was built on the premises of the shrine to Pir Shah Kaku.

=== Sikh rule and occupation/destruction of the mosque ===
There was a public square near the mosque, where criminals were punished during the tenure of Nawab Zakariya Khan Bahadur, a Mughal governor of the Punjab in the 18th century. Taru Singh, a Sikh man who aided Sikhs against the Mughals was executed. After that incident, the Sikhs officially declared Taru Singh a martyr and named the public square as the Shaheed Ganj (Martyr Square).

In 1762, the Bhangi Misl Sikh army conquered Lahore and occupied the mosque, together with the public square. The Muslims were not allowed to enter and pray, although Sikhs were given the right to pray. The Sikhs built a gurdwara called Gurudwara Shaheed Bhai Taru Singh in remembrance of Sikh martyrs in the courtyard while the Mosque building was used as a residence for the Sikh priest.

=== British rule and demolition of the mosque ===
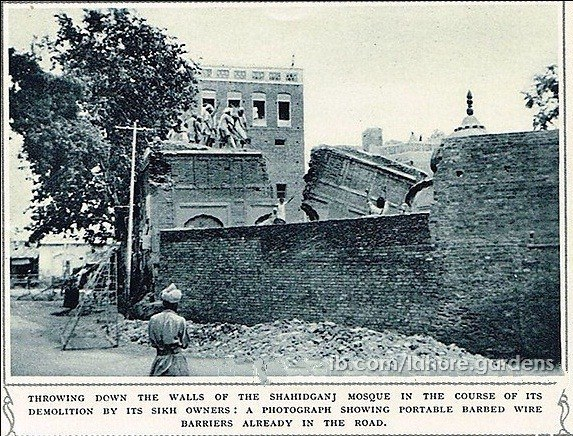
Throwing down the walls of the mosque in the course of its demolition, ca.1935

After British colonial occupation of the Punjab in 1849, The Mosque became an issue between Muslims and Sikhs again. Muslims protested against the Sikh occupation Shaheed Ganj Mosque. On April 17, 1850, Nur Ahmed, a Muslim resident of Lahore, claimed to be a mutawallī (trustee) of the mosque and filed a case in Punjab High Court. Nur Ahmed filed several suits between 1853 and 1883 to recover the Shaheed Ganj Mosque, but courts maintained the status quo.

On 29 June 1935, the Sikhs announced that they would demolish the Shaheed Ganj Mosque. Several thousand Muslims assembled in front of the mosque to protect it and Anjuman-i Tahaffuz-i Masjid Shahidganj (Organization for the protection of the Shaheedgunj Mosque) was formed. Sir Herbert Emerson, the Governor of the Punjab, tried to negotiate to find mutually acceptable solution. But, on the night of 7 July 1935 the Sikhs demolished the mosque, minutes of British India Privy Council say "by or with the connivance of its Sikh custodians", leading to riots and disorder in Lahore.

=== Muslim reactions ===
Jamaat Ali Shah (1834–1951), born in Alipur Sharif Dist, Sialkot, Pakistan, led the Shaheed Ganj Mosque movement. After the mosque's demolition, Muslims held a public meetings on 19–20 July at the Badshahi Mosque, and marched directly on the Shaheedganj mosque. There were riots on 20 and 21 July in which the police opened fire, and killed 12 Muslims.

=== Court case ===
On 25 May 1936, a Judge of the District Court of Lahore dismissed the suit which Muslims had filed after the demolition. The judgement of Bombay High Court on 2 May 1940 on Masjid Shahid Ganj Mosque vs Shiromani Gurdwara Parbandhak recognized the building as a mosque, but maintained that the Statute of limitations has passed since the property has been occupied by the Sikhs for more than 170 years.

== Architecture ==
The mosque had three domes, each accompanied by a minaret and five arches. It had a courtyard and an orchard of fruit trees.

== See also ==
- Islam in Pakistan
- List of mosques in Pakistan
- Dulla Bhatti
