= Sirik Rural District =

Rural district in Hormozgan province, Iran

Sirik Rural District Persian: دهستان سيريك
- Rural District
- Location within Iran
- Coordinates: 26°34′14″N 57°11′13″E
- Country: Iran
- Province: Hormozgan
- County: Sirik
- District: Central
- Capital: Bandar Sirik

Population (2016)
  - Total: 8,846
- Time zone: UTC+3:30 (IRST)

Sirik Rural District (Persian: دهستان سيريك) is in the Central District of Sirik County, Hormozgan province, Iran. It is administered from the city of Bandar Sirik. (Note: Formerly the village of Biyaban)

== Demographics ==
=== Population ===
At the time of the 2006 National Census, the rural district's population (as a part of the former Biyaban District of Minab County) was 11,311 in 1,909 households. There were 12,898 inhabitants in 2,800 households at the following census of 2011, by which time the district had been separated from the county in the establishment of Sirik County. The rural district was transferred to the new Central District. The 2016 census measured the population of the rural district as 8,846 in 2,343 households. The most populous of its 19 villages was Sham Ju, with 1,280 people.

== Sirik Under Attack ==
According to IRNA, (during 2026 Iran war) the CEO of the Hormozgan Water and Wastewater Company stated that following a US attack in the early hours of Wednesday, June 10, 2026, on water supply facilities in Sirik County, the supply of drinking water to the city of Kohestak and ten villages in the Bamani District was completely cut off.
