= Biyaban District =

Former district in Hormozgan province, Iran

Biyaban District Persian: بخش بيابان
- Former District
- Location within Iran
- Coordinates: 26°30′N 57°17′E
- Country: Iran
- Province: Hormozgan
- County: Minab
- Capital: Bandar Sirik

Population (2006)
  - Total: 38,251
- Time zone: UTC+3:30 (IRST)

Biyaban District (Persian: بخش بيابان) is a former administrative division of Minab County, Hormozgan province, Iran. Its capital was the city of Bandar Sirik. (Note: Formerly the village of Biyaban)

== History ==
After the 2006 National Census, the district was separated from the county in the establishment of Sirik County.

== Demographics ==
=== Population ===
At the time of the 2006 census, the district's population was 38,251 in 6,623 households.

=== Administrative divisions ===
Biyaban District Population
Administrative Divisions	2006
Bemani RD	11,633
Biyaban RD	11,667
Sirik RD	11,311
Bandar Sirik (city)	3,640
Total	38,251
RD = Rural District
