= Bemani Rural District =

Rural district in Hormozgan province, Iran

Bemani Rural District Persian: دهستان بمانی
- Rural District
- Location within Iran
- Coordinates: 26°51′57″N 57°02′24″E
- Country: Iran
- Province: Hormozgan
- County: Sirik
- District: Bemani
- Capital: Kuhestak

Population (2016)
  - Total: 5,565
- Time zone: UTC+3:30 (IRST)

Bemani Rural District (Persian: دهستان بمانی) is in Bemani District of Sirik County, Hormozgan province, Iran. It is administered from the city of Kuhestak.

== Demographics ==
=== Population ===
At the time of the 2006 National Census, the rural district's population (as a part of the former Biyaban District of Minab County) was 11,633 in 2,078 households. There were 7,702 inhabitants in 1,665 households at the following census of 2011, by which time the district had been separated from the county in the establishment of Sirik County. The rural district was transferred to the new Bemani District. The 2016 census measured the population of the rural district as 5,565 in 1,381 households. The most populous of its nine villages was Gerdu, with 1,878 people.

== Attack and cutting off the water supply ==
During 2026 Iran war, the CEO of the Hormozgan Water and Wastewater Company stated that following a US attack in the early hours of Wednesday, June 10, 2026, on water supply facilities in Sirik County, the supply of drinking water to the city of Kohestak and ten villages in the "Bamani District" was completely cut off.
