= Biyaban Rural District =

Rural district in Hormozgan province, Iran

Biyaban Rural District Persian: دهستان بيابان
- Rural District
- Location within Iran
- Coordinates: 26°18′58″N 57°17′06″E
- Country: Iran
- Province: Hormozgan
- County: Sirik
- District: Central
- Capital: Gunamordi

Population (2016)
  - Total: 13,559
- Time zone: UTC+3:30 (IRST)

Biyaban Rural District (Persian: دهستان بيابان) is in the Central District of Sirik County, Hormozgan province, Iran. Its capital is the village of Gunamordi.

== Demographics ==
=== Population ===
At the time of the 2006 National Census, the rural district's population (as a part of the former Biyaban District of Minab County) was 11,667 in 1,996 households. There were 13,160 inhabitants in 2,635 households at the following census of 2011, by which time the district had been separated from the county in the establishment of Sirik County. The rural district was transferred to the new Central District. The 2016 census measured the population of the rural district as 13,559 in 3,163 households. The most populous of its 41 villages was Sarzeh, with 1,633 people.
