= Sirik County =

County in Hormozgan province, Iran

Sirik County Persian: شهرستان سیریک
- County
- Location of Sirik County in Hormozgan province (right, green)

- Location of Hormozgan province in Iran
- Coordinates: 26°30′N 57°17′E
- Country: Iran
- Province: Hormozgan
- Capital: Bandar Sirik
- Districts: Central, Bemani

Population (2016)
  - Total: 45,723
- Time zone: UTC+3:30 (IRST)

Sirik County (Persian: شهرستان سیریک) is in Hormozgan province, Iran. Its capital is the city of Bandar Sirik. (Note: Formerly the village of Biyaban)

== History ==
After the 2006 National Census, Biyaban District was separated from Minab County in the establishment of Sirik County, which was divided into two districts of two rural districts each, with Bandar Sirik as its capital and only city at the time. After the 2011 census, the villages of Garuk and Kuhestak were elevated to city status.

== Demographics ==
=== Population ===
At the time of the 2011 census, the county's population was 43,185 people in 9,294 households. The 2016 census measured the population of the county as 45,723 in 11,304 households.

=== Administrative divisions ===
Sirik County's population history and administrative structure over two consecutive censuses are shown in the following table.

Sirik County Population
Administrative Divisions	2011	2016
Central District	30,198	31,550
Biyaban RD	13,160	13,559
Sirik RD	12,898	8,846
Bandar Sirik (city)	4,140	5,137
Garuk (city)		4,008
Bemani District	12,987	14,173
Bemani RD	7,702	5,565
Shahmardi RD	5,285	5,548
Kuhestak (city)		3,060
Total	43,185	45,723
RD = Rural District

== Geography ==
There are two main types of hara and Chandelle forests in Khoreh Azini. A salt-tolerant tree known as the hara absorbs seawater during high tide and, thanks to its purifying properties, excretes the salt through its bark. The hara forests have grown to a size of about 500 hectares close to the village of Ganari. The coexistence of two plant species, mangroves and Hara, along with the rare Chandelle species, makes these mangrove forests distinct from other muddy habitats along Iran's southern coasts. Numerous animal and plant species can thrive in these forests thanks to the ecological circumstances that govern them, and many birds winter here.

== Tourism ==
The tourist village of Kuhestak is located in Sirik County. This old port town has sandy beaches and is one of the tourist-friendly areas in the region. The establishment of fishing shelters and the presence of fishing and commercial vessels are among the advantages of this area.

The presence of sandy beaches between Garuk and Sirik, as well as the construction of a multipurpose port in Sirik, have consistently attracted many tourists and visitors to the natural attractions of the sea and the beach throughout the seasons.

== Sirik Under Attack ==
According to IRNA, (during 2026 Iran war) the CEO of the Hormozgan Water and Wastewater Company stated that following a US attack in the early hours of Wednesday, June 10, 2026, on water supply facilities in Sirik County, the supply of drinking water to the city of Kohestak and ten villages in the Bamani District was completely cut off.

== See also ==
Media related to Sirik County at Wikimedia Commons
