= Dohneh =

Dohneh or Dahaneh or Dahneh or Dohineh or Duhinah or Dukhinakh (Persian: دهنه) may refer to:

== Afghanistan ==
- Dahaneh-ye Ghowri

== Iran ==
- Dahaneh, Golestan
- Dahaneh Khvajeh Nafas, Golestan Province
- Dahaneh-ye Porsu Qui, Golestan Province
- Dahaneh-ye Dahandar, Hormozgan Province
- Dahaneh-ye Meymand, Hormozgan Province
- Dahaneh-ye Sohrab, Hormozgan Province
- Dahaneh-ye Tavarkan, Hormozgan Province
- Dahaneh-ye Abshuiyeh, Kerman Province
- Dahaneh-ye Gomrokan, Kerman Province
- Dahaneh Morghak, Kerman Province
- Dahaneh Sar Asiyab, Kerman Province
- Dahaneh-ye Ab Dar, Kerman Province
- Dahaneh-ye Abbasali, Kerman Province
- Dahaneh-ye Bagh, Kerman Province
- Dahaneh-ye Khargan, Kerman Province
- Dahaneh-e Zurak, Kerman Province
- Dahaneh-ye Ojaq, North Khorasan Province
- Dahaneh-ye Shirin, North Khorasan Province
- Dohneh, Qazvin
- Dahaneh-ye Chahal, Razavi Khorasan Province
- Dahaneh-ye Heydari, Razavi Khorasan Province
- Dahaneh-ye Sakhu, Razavi Khorasan Province
- Dahaneh-ye Shur, Razavi Khorasan Province
- Dahaneh, Sistan and Baluchestan
- Dahaneh, South Khorasan
- Dahaneh-ye Chah, South Khorasan Province
- Dahaneh-ye Tangal, South Khorasan Province
- Dohneh, Zanjan
