= Zamin =

Zamin may refer to:

- Zameen (novel), alternatively spelled as Zamin, an Urdu novel by Khadija Mastoor

Places in Iran

- Zamin-e Anjir
- Zamin-e Bandabad-e Barik
- Zamin-e Dar
- Zamin-e Hansin
- Zamin-e Hasan
- Zamin Lashkari
- Zamin-e Molla
- Zamin-e Sabah
- Zamin-e Siah
- Zamin-e Taghuk
- Zamin-e Tuman

== See also ==
- Zaamin (disambiguation)
- Zameen (disambiguation)
- Zamindar (disambiguation)
