= Dahandar =

Dahandar or Dehendar or Dahan-e Dar (Persian: دهن در or دهندر) may refer to:

- Dahan-e Dar, Senderk, Hormozgan Province
- Dahandar, Tukahur, Hormozgan Province
- Dahandar-e Kalak, Hormozgan Province
- Dahandar-e Mir Amr, Hormozgan Province
- Dehendar-e Shahbabak, Hormozgan Province
- Dahandar-e Shonbeh, Hormozgan Province
- Dahandar, Kerman
