= SIT =

Sit commonly refers to sitting.

Sit, SIT or Sitting may also refer to:

== Places ==
- Sit, Bashagard, a village in Hormozgan Province, Iran
- Sit, Gafr and Parmon, a village in Hormozgan Province, Iran
- Sit, Minab, a village in Hormozgan Province, Iran
- Sīt, a village in Hormozgan Province, Iran
- Sit (island), Croatia
- Sit (river), Russia

== Organizations ==
- Singapore Improvement Trust, a government public housing organization
- Special Investigation Team (India), a team of Indian investigators for serious crimes
- Special Investigation Team, tactical detective units of Japanese prefectural police
- Strategic Information Technology, a Canadian banking software company

=== Educational organizations and certification ===
- Salazar Institute of Technology, Cebu, Philippines
- Schaffhausen Institute of Technology, Schaffhausen, Switzerland
- School of Information Technology, King Mongkut's University of Technology Thonburi, Bangkok, Thailand
- School for International Training, Brattleboro, Vermont, United States
- Shibaura Institute of Technology, Tokyo, Japan
- Siliguri Institute of Technology, West Bengal, India
- Singapore Institute of Technology, an autonomous university in Singapore
- Southeastern Institute of Technology, Huntsville, Alabama, United States
- Southern Institute of Technology, Invercargill, New Zealand
- Stevens Institute of Technology, Hoboken, New Jersey, United States

== Psychology ==
- Sexual identity therapy
- SIT-lite, pejorative term for a form of social identity theory
- Structural Information Theory, a theory of human perception

== Science and technology ==
- Sea ice thickness
- Static induction thyristor
- Static induction transistor
- Simple Internet Transition, an IPv6 over IPv4 tunneling protocol
- .sit, or .sitx, file extensions used for compressed files created with StuffIt
- System integration testing, a process in software engineering
- Special information tone, a three beep signal indicating a call did not go through
- Specific ion interaction theory, a theory for estimation of single-ion activity coefficients
- Sprint interval training, a form of high-intensity interval training in which sprinting is interspersed with walking
- Sterile insect technique, a technique for managing insect populations
- Systematic inventive thinking, a practical methodology for innovation and creative problem solving
  - Systematic Inventive Thinking (company), a company based in Israel implementing the systematic inventive thinking method in organizations
- Spectrum Information Technologies, a defunct American computer networking hardware company

== Transport ==
- SIT, IATA code for Sitka Rocky Gutierrez Airport, United States
- SIT, National Rail station code for Sittingbourne railway station, Kent, England

== Other ==
- Sino-Tibetan languages, the ISO 639-2 code
- Slovenian tolar, the ISO 4217 code for the former currency of Slovenia
- SİT areas in Turkey, archaeological sites in Turkey
- Sit (surname), Chinese surname
- "Sitting", a song from Cat Stevens' album Catch Bull at Four
- Somewhere In Time (Iron Maiden album) (1986)

== See also ==
- SITS (disambiguation)
