= Akharan =

Village in Hormozgan province, Iran

Akharan Persian: اخران
- Village
- Location in Iran
- Coordinates: 26°16′49″N 58°31′10″E
- Country: Iran
- Province: Hormozgan
- County: Bashagard
- District: Gafr and Parmon
- Rural District: Gafr

Population (2016)
  - Total: 334
- Time zone: UTC+3:30 (IRST)

Akharan (Persian: اخران) (Note: Also romanized as Ākharān and Ākherān; also known as Ākharūn) is a village in Gafr Rural District of Gafr and Parmon District, Bashagard County, Hormozgan province, Iran.

== Demographics ==
=== Population ===
At the time of the 2006 National Census, the village's population was 176 in 46 households, when it was in Gafr and Parmon Rural District (Note: Renamed Parmon Rural District) of the former Bashagard District of Jask County. The following census in 2011 counted 351 people in 100 households, by which time the district had been separated from the county in the establishment of Bashagard County. The rural district was transferred to the new Gafr and Parmon District and renamed Parmon Rural District. Akharan was transferred to Gafr Rural District created in the district. The 2016 census measured the population of the village as 334 people in 81 households. It was the most populous village in its rural district.
