= Khomeyni Shahr, Hormozgan =

Village in Hormozgan province, Iran

Khomeyni Shahr Persian: خميني شهر
- Village
- Location within Iran
- Coordinates: 26°37′06″N 58°02′03″E
- Country: Iran
- Province: Hormozgan
- County: Bashagard
- District: Gowharan
- Rural District: Dar Absar

Population (2016)
  - Total: 812
- Time zone: UTC+3:30 (IRST)

Khomeyni Shahr (Persian: خميني شهر) (Note: Also romanized as Khomeynī Shahr) is a village in, and the capital of, Dar Absar Rural District of Gowharan District, Bashagard County, Hormozgan province, Iran.

== Demographics ==
=== Population ===
At the time of the 2006 National Census, the village's population was 356 in 71 households, when it was in Gowharan Rural District of the former Bashagard District of Jask County. The following census in 2011 counted 984 people in 85 households, by which time the district had been separated from the county in the establishment of Bashagard County. The rural district was transferred to the new Gowharan District, and Khomeyni Shahr was transferred to Dar Absar Rural District created in the district. The 2016 census measured the population of the village as 812 people in 71 households. It was the most populous village in its rural district.
