= Kohnab =

Kohnab or Kahnab (Persian: كهناب), sometimes written Konab, may refer to:

- Kohnab, Lali, Khuzestan Province
- Kohnab, Kohgiluyeh and Boyer-Ahmad
- Konab, Markazi
- Kahnab, Zanjan
- Kohnab-e Bala (disambiguation)
- Kohnab-e Pain
