= Pahetek =

Village in Hormozgan province, Iran

Pahetek Persian: پاهتك
- Village
- Location within Iran
- Coordinates: 26°35′09″N 57°52′15″E
- Country: Iran
- Province: Hormozgan
- County: Bashagard
- District: Gowharan
- Rural District: Gowharan

Population (2016)
  - Total: 503
- Time zone: UTC+3:30 (IRST)

Pahetek (Persian: پاهتك) (Note: Also romanized as Pāhetek and Pāhtek; also known as Pātek, Pathek, and Zīnan) is a village in Gowharan Rural District (Note: Formerly Angahran Rural District) of Gowharan District, Bashagard County, Hormozgan province, Iran.

== Demographics ==
=== Population ===
At the time of the 2006 National Census, the village's population was 584 in 150 households, when it was in the former Bashagard District of Jask County. The following census in 2011 counted 626 people in 176 households, by which time the district had been separated from the county in the establishment of Bashagard County. The rural district was transferred to the new Gowharan District. The 2016 census measured the population of the village as 503 people in 172 households. It was the most populous village in its rural district.
