= Zach Darbast =

Zach Darbast زاچ داربست
- Village
- Interactive map of Zach Darbast
- Country: Iran
- Province: Hormozgan
- County: Bashagard
- Bakhsh: Central
- Rural District: Jakdan

Population (2006)
  - Total: 119
- Time zone: UTC+3:30 (IRST)
  - Summer (DST): UTC+4:30 (IRDT)

Zach Darbast (Persian: زاچ داربست, also Romanized as Zāch Dārbast) is a village in Jakdan Rural District, in the Central District of Bashagard County, Hormozgan Province, Iran. At the 2006 census, its population was 119, in 25 families.
