= Bar Ahang =

Bar Ahang براهنگ
- Village
- Location within Iran
- Coordinates: 26°26′57″N 57°32′24″E
- Country: Iran
- Province: Hormozgan
- County: Bashagard
- Bakhsh: Central
- Rural District: Jakdan

Population (2006)
  - Total: 228
- Time zone: UTC+3:30 (IRST)
  - Summer (DST): UTC+4:30 (IRDT)

Bar Ahang (Persian: براهنگ, also Romanized as Bar Āhang and Barāheng; also known as Derakht-e Lashkarī) is a village in Jakdan Rural District, in the Central District of Bashagard County, Hormozgan Province, Iran. At the 2006 census, its population was 228, in 50 families.
