= Sit, Gafr and Parmon =

Village in Hormozgan province, Iran

Sit Persian: سيت
- Village
- Location within Iran
- Coordinates: 26°14′58″N 58°12′33″E
- Country: Iran
- Province: Hormozgan
- County: Bashagard
- District: Gafr and Parmon
- Rural District: Gafr

Population (2016)
  - Total: 249
- Time zone: UTC+3:30 (IRST)

Sit (Persian: سيت) (Note: Also romanized as Sīt) is a village in, and the capital of, Gafr Rural District, Gafr and Parmon District, Bashagard County, Hormozgan province, Iran.

== Demographics ==
=== Population ===
At the time of the 2006 National Census, the village's population was 260 in 67 households, when it was in Gafr and Parmon Rural District (Note: Renamed Parmon Rural District) of the former Bashagard District of Jask County. The following census in 2011 counted 320 people in 90 households, by which time the district had been separated from the county in the establishment of Bashagard County. The rural district was transferred to the new Gafr and Parmon District and renamed Parmon Rural District. Sit was transferred to Gafr Rural District created in the district. The 2016 census measured the population of the village as 249 people in 68 households.
