= Jakdan, Iran =

Village in Hormozgan province, Iran

Jakdan Persian: جكدان
- Village
- Location within Iran
- Coordinates: 26°25′57″N 57°44′45″E
- Country: Iran
- Province: Hormozgan
- County: Bashagard
- District: Central
- Rural District: Jakdan

Population (2016)
  - Total: 1,239
- Time zone: UTC+3:30 (IRST)

Jakdan (Persian: جكدان) (Note: Also romanized as Jakadān and Jakdān; also known as Jagdān, Jogdān, Joghdān, and Kalūjakadān (كلوجكدان )) is a village in, and the capital of, Jakdan Rural District of the Central District of Bashagard County, Hormozgan province, Iran.

== Demographics ==
=== Population ===
At the time of the 2006 National Census, the village's population was 684 in 161 households, when it was in the former Bashagard District of Jask County. The following census in 2011 counted 1,596 people in 412 households, by which time the district had been separated from the county in the establishment of Bashagard County. The rural district was transferred to the new Central District. The 2016 census measured the population of the village as 1,239 people in 367 households. It was the most populous village in its rural district.
