= Do Gonvir =

Do Gonvir دوگنوير
- Village
- Location within Iran
- Coordinates: 26°24′12″N 58°18′30″E
- Country: Iran
- Province: Hormozgan
- County: Bashagard
- Bakhsh: Gafr and Parmon
- Rural District: Gafr and Parmon

Population (2006)
  - Total: 292
- Time zone: UTC+3:30 (IRST)
  - Summer (DST): UTC+4:30 (IRDT)

Do Gonvir (Persian: دوگنوير, also Romanized as Do Gonvīr) is a village in the Gafr and Parmon Rural District, Gafr and Parmon District, Bashagard County, Hormozgan Province, Iran. At the 2006 census, its population was 292, living in 79 families.
