= Gurevi =

Gurevi گوروي
- Village
- Location within Iran
- Coordinates: 26°49′15″N 57°52′14″E
- Country: Iran
- Province: Hormozgan
- County: Bashagard
- Bakhsh: Gowharan
- Rural District: Gowharan

Population (2006)
  - Total: 259
- Time zone: UTC+3:30 (IRST)
  - Summer (DST): UTC+4:30 (IRDT)

Gurevi (Persian: گوروي, also Romanized as Gūrevī; also known as Gorevī) is a village in Gowharan Rural District, Gowharan District, Bashagard County, Hormozgan Province, Iran. At the 2006 census, its population was 259, in 59 families.
