= Tejak =

Tejak تجك
- Village
- Location within Iran
- Coordinates: 26°35′21″N 57°57′45″E
- Country: Iran
- Province: Hormozgan
- County: Bashagard
- Bakhsh: Gowharan
- Rural District: Gowharan

Population (2006)
  - Total: 223
- Time zone: UTC+3:30 (IRST)
  - Summer (DST): UTC+4:30 (IRDT)

Tejak (Persian: تجك, also Romanized as Tachak and Techek) is a village in Gowharan Rural District, Gowharan District, Bashagard County, Hormozgan Province, Iran. At the 2006 census, its population was 223, in 59 families.
