= Molkan =

Village in Hormozgan province, Iran

Molkan Persian: ملكن
- Village
- Location within Iran
- Coordinates: 26°33′22″N 58°02′07″E
- Country: Iran
- Province: Hormozgan
- County: Bashagard
- District: Central
- Rural District: Sardasht

Population (2016)
  - Total: 685
- Time zone: UTC+3:30 (IRST)

Molkan (Persian: ملكن) is a village in Sardasht Rural District of the Central District of Bashagard County, Hormozgan province, Iran.

== Demographics ==
=== Population ===
At the time of the 2006 National Census, the village's population was 571 in 101 households, when it was in the former Bashagard District of Jask County. The following census in 2011 counted 743 people in 176 households, by which time the district had been separated from the county in the establishment of Bashagard County. The rural district was transferred to the new Central District. The 2016 census measured the population of the village as 685 people in 153 households. It was the most populous village in its rural district.
