= Kujak Mahmudi =

Kujak Mahmudi كوجك محمودئ
- Village
- Country: Iran
- Province: Hormozgan
- County: Bashagard
- Bakhsh: Central
- Rural District: Jakdan

Population (2006)
  - Total: 15
- Time zone: UTC+3:30 (IRST)
  - Summer (DST): UTC+4:30 (IRDT)

Kujak Mahmudi (Persian: كوجك محمودئ, also Romanized as Kūjaḵ Maḥmūdi) is a village in Jakdan Rural District, in the Central District of Bashagard County, Hormozgan Province, Iran. At the 2006 census, its population was 15, in 4 families.
