= Sagarkan =

Sagarkan سگركن
- Village
- Location within Iran
- Coordinates: 26°18′16″N 58°08′26″E
- Country: Iran
- Province: Hormozgan
- County: Bashagard
- Bakhsh: Gafr and Parmon
- Rural District: Gafr and Parmon

Population (2006)
  - Total: 201
- Time zone: UTC+3:30 (IRST)
  - Summer (DST): UTC+4:30 (IRDT)

Sagarkan (Persian: سگركن, also Romanized as Segerkan) is a village in Gafr and Parmon Rural District, Gafr and Parmon District, Bashagard County, Hormozgan Province, Iran. At the 2006 census, its population was 201, in 52 families.
