= Sar Hur =

Sar Hur سرهور
- Village
- Location within Iran
- Coordinates: 26°41′58″N 57°51′15″E
- Country: Iran
- Province: Hormozgan
- County: Bashagard
- Bakhsh: Gowharan
- Rural District: Gowharan

Population (2006)
  - Total: 219
- Time zone: UTC+3:30 (IRST)
  - Summer (DST): UTC+4:30 (IRDT)

Sar Hur Village Board

Sar Hur (Persian: سرهور, also Romanized as Sar Hūr; also known as Sirhur) is a village in Gowharan Rural District, Gowharan District, Bashagard County, Hormozgan Province, Iran. At the 2006 census, its population was 219, in 47 families.
