= Behtish =

Behtish به تيش
- Village
- Location within Iran
- Coordinates: 26°38′26″N 58°02′02″E
- Country: Iran
- Province: Hormozgan
- County: Bashagard
- Bakhsh: Gowharan
- Rural District: Gowharan

Population (2006)
  - Total: 314
- Time zone: UTC+3:30 (IRST)
  - Summer (DST): UTC+4:30 (IRDT)

Behtish (Persian: به تيش, also Romanized as Behtīsh) is a village in Gowharan Rural District, Gowharan District, Bashagard County, Hormozgan Province, Iran. At the 2006 census, its population was 314, in 69 families.
