= Garaman =

Garaman گارامان
- Village
- Location within Iran
- Coordinates: 26°36′41″N 57°43′43″E
- Country: Iran
- Province: Hormozgan
- County: Bashagard
- Bakhsh: Gowharan
- Rural District: Gowharan

Population (2006)
  - Total: 243
- Time zone: UTC+3:30 (IRST)
  - Summer (DST): UTC+4:30 (IRDT)

Garaman (Persian: گارامان, also Romanized as Gārāmān; also known as Gārāmūn and Gāvamūn) is a village in Gowharan Rural District, Gowharan District, Bashagard County, Hormozgan Province, Iran. At the 2006 census, its population was 243, in 54 families.
