= Do Mergh =

Do Mergh دومرغ
- Village
- Location within Iran
- Coordinates: 26°37′29″N 57°57′02″E
- Country: Iran
- Province: Hormozgan
- County: Bashagard
- Bakhsh: Gowharan
- Rural District: Gowharan

Population (2006)
  - Total: 122
- Time zone: UTC+3:30 (IRST)
  - Summer (DST): UTC+4:30 (IRDT)

Do Mergh (Persian: دومرغ; also known as Domerkh, Do Sorkh, Dowmerkh, and Dūmerkh) is a village in Gowharan Rural District, Gowharan District, Bashagard County, Hormozgan Province, Iran. At the 2006 census, its population was 122, in 30 families.
