= Band-e Barak =

Band-e Barak بند بارك
- Village
- Country: Iran
- Province: Hormozgan
- County: Bashagard
- Bakhsh: Gowharan
- Rural District: Gowharan

Population (2006)
  - Total: 272
- Time zone: UTC+3:30 (IRST)
  - Summer (DST): UTC+4:30 (IRDT)

Band-e Barak (Persian: بند بارك, also Romanized as Band-e Bāraḵ) is a village in Gowharan Rural District, Gowharan District, Bashagard County, Hormozgan Province, Iran.

== Demographics ==
At the 2006 census, its population was 272, in 45 families.
