= Tirahmad =

Tirahmad تيراحمد
- Village
- Location within Iran
- Coordinates: 26°29′47″N 57°46′43″E
- Country: Iran
- Province: Hormozgan
- County: Bashagard
- Bakhsh: Central
- Rural District: Jakdan

Population (2006)
  - Total: 112
- Time zone: UTC+3:30 (IRST)
  - Summer (DST): UTC+4:30 (IRDT)

Tirahmad (Persian: تيراحمد, also Romanized as Tīraḩmad; also known as Tīraḩmat) is a village in Jakdan Rural District, in the Central District of Bashagard County, Hormozgan Province, Iran. At the 2006 census, its population was 112, in 27 families.
