= Darmar =

Darmar درمار
- Village
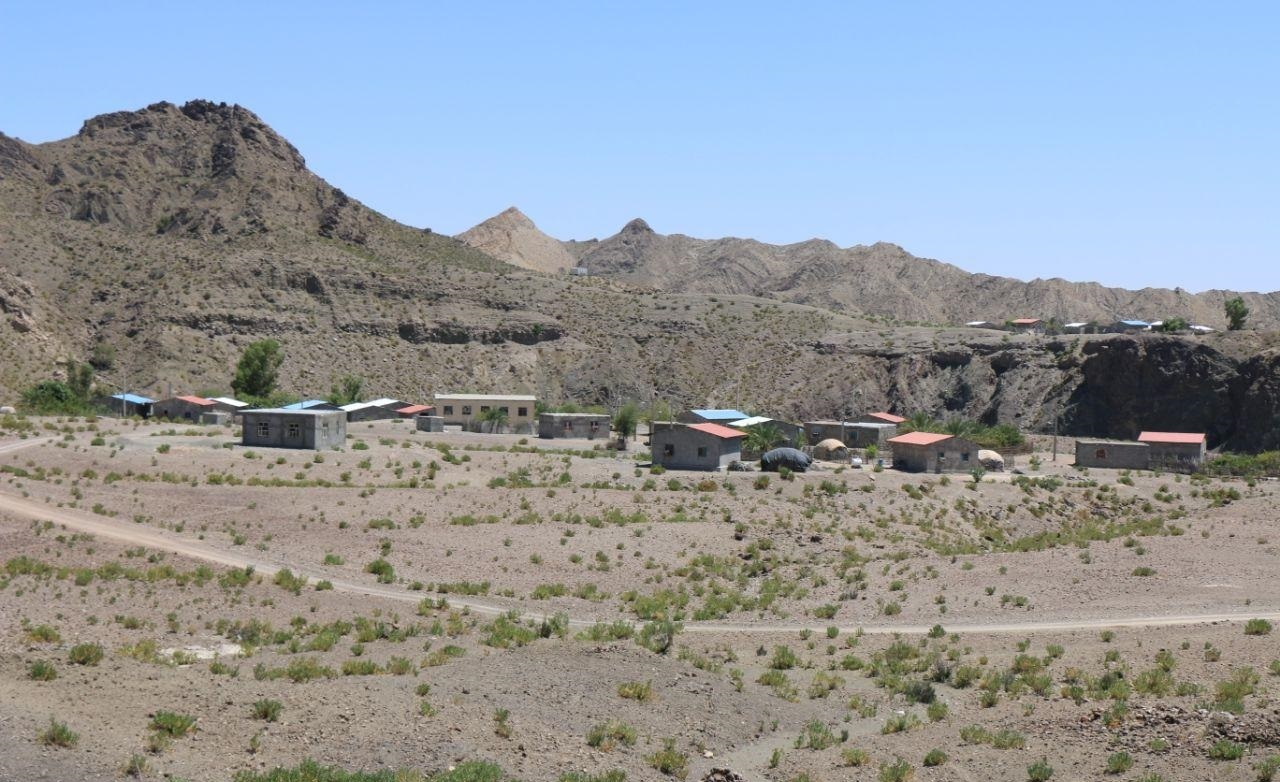
- Interactive map of Darmar
- Country: Iran
- Province: Hormozgan
- County: Bashagard
- Bakhsh: Gowharan
- Rural District: Gowharan

Population (2006)
  - Total: 74
- Time zone: UTC+3:30 (IRST)
  - Summer (DST): UTC+4:30 (IRDT)

Darmar (Persian: درمار, also Romanized as Darmār) is a village in Gowharan Rural District, Gowharan District, Bashagard County, Hormozgan Province, Iran. At the 2006 census, its population was 74, in 19 families.
