= Rapij =

Rapij راپيج
- Village
- Location within Iran
- Coordinates: 26°20′54″N 58°12′32″E
- Country: Iran
- Province: Hormozgan
- County: Bashagard
- Bakhsh: Gafr and Parmon
- Rural District: Gafr and Parmon

Population (2006)
  - Total: 106
- Time zone: UTC+3:30 (IRST)
  - Summer (DST): UTC+4:30 (IRDT)

Rapij (Persian: راپيج, also Romanized as Rāpīj; also known as Epīch, Rāh Pīch, and Rāpīch) is a village in Gafr and Parmon Rural District, Gafr and Parmon District, Bashagard County, Hormozgan Province, Iran. At the 2006 census, its population was 106, in 23 families.
