= Gurichi =

Gurichi گوريچي
- Village
- Location within Iran
- Coordinates: 26°27′23″N 57°45′05″E
- Country: Iran
- Province: Hormozgan
- County: Bashagard
- Bakhsh: Central
- Rural District: Jakdan

Population (2006)
  - Total: 480
- Time zone: UTC+3:30 (IRST)
  - Summer (DST): UTC+4:30 (IRDT)

Gurichi (Persian: گوريچي, also Romanized as Gūrīchī; also known as Gūrīchī Bālā) is a village in Jakdan Rural District, in the Central District of Bashagard County, Hormozgan Province, Iran. At the 2006 census, its population was 480, in 118 families.
