= Biskau =

Biskau بيسكاو
- Village
- Location within Iran
- Coordinates: 26°29′03″N 57°52′23″E
- Country: Iran
- Province: Hormozgan
- County: Bashagard
- Bakhsh: Central
- Rural District: Sardasht

Population (2006)
  - Total: 115
- Time zone: UTC+3:30 (IRST)
  - Summer (DST): UTC+4:30 (IRDT)

Biskau (Persian: بيسكاو, also Romanized as Bīskāū; also known as Bīskāh, Bīskan, and Bīskū) is a village in Sardasht Rural District, in the Central District of Bashagard County, Hormozgan Province, Iran. At the 2006 census, its population was 115, in 28 families.
