= Deralavi =

Deralavi درالوي
- Village
- Location within Iran
- Coordinates: 26°28′22″N 57°46′05″E
- Country: Iran
- Province: Hormozgan
- County: Bashagard
- Bakhsh: Central
- Rural District: Jakdan

Population (2006)
  - Total: 257
- Time zone: UTC+3:30 (IRST)
  - Summer (DST): UTC+4:30 (IRDT)

Deralavi (Persian: درالوي, also Romanized as Derālavī) is a village in Jakdan Rural District, in the Central District of Bashagard County, Hormozgan Province, Iran. At the 2006 census, its population was 257, in 60 families.
