= Gafr and Parmon =

Gafr and Parmon (Persian: بخش گافروپارمون) may refer to:

- Gafr Rural District
- Gafr and Parmon District
- Gafr and Parmon Rural District
- Parmon Rural District
