= Abgaman =

Abgaman ابگمان
- Village
- Location within Iran
- Coordinates: 26°36′44″N 58°00′21″E
- Country: Iran
- Province: Hormozgan
- County: Bashagard
- Bakhsh: Gowharan
- Rural District: Gowharan

Population (2006)
  - Total: 11
- Time zone: UTC+3:30 (IRST)
  - Summer (DST): UTC+4:30 (IRDT)

Abgaman (Persian: ابگمان, also Romanized as Ābgamān) is a village in Gowharan Rural District, Gowharan District, Bashagard County, Hormozgan Province, Iran. At the 2006 census, its population was 11, in 4 families.
