= Jumit =

Jumit جوميت
- Village
- Location within Iran
- Coordinates: 26°39′42″N 57°48′17″E
- Country: Iran
- Province: Hormozgan
- County: Bashagard
- Bakhsh: Gowharan
- Rural District: Gowharan

Population (2006)
  - Total: 26
- Time zone: UTC+3:30 (IRST)
  - Summer (DST): UTC+4:30 (IRDT)

Jumit (Persian: جوميت, also Romanized as Jūmīt; also known as Ānkhor and Jūmīt Chehel Gazī) is a village in Gowharan Rural District, Gowharan District, Bashagard County, Hormozgan Province, Iran. At the 2006 census, its population was 26, in 8 families.
