= Baharkan =

Baharkan بهركان
- Village
- Location within Iran
- Coordinates: 26°26′15″N 58°14′36″E
- Country: Iran
- Province: Hormozgan
- County: Bashagard
- Bakhsh: Gafr and Parmon
- Rural District: Gafr and Parmon

Population (2006)
  - Total: 34
- Time zone: UTC+3:30 (IRST)
  - Summer (DST): UTC+4:30 (IRDT)

Baharkan (Persian: بهركان, also Romanized as Baharkān; also known as Bāharīkān and Bāhrīkān) is a village in Gafr and Parmon Rural District, Gafr and Parmon District, Bashagard County, Hormozgan Province, Iran. At the 2006 census, its population was 34, in 11 families.
