= Zahak-e Pain =

Zahak-e Pain زحک پایین
- Village
- Location within Iran
- Coordinates: 26°18′30″N 57°30′34″E
- Country: Iran
- Province: Hormozgan
- County: Bashagard
- Bakhsh: Central
- Rural District: Jakdan

Population (2006)
  - Total: 86
- Time zone: UTC+3:30 (IRST)
  - Summer (DST): UTC+4:30 (IRDT)

Zahak-e Pain (Persian: زحک پایین, also Romanized as Zaḥaḵ-e Pāyīn) is a village in Jakdan Rural District, in the Central District of Bashagard County, Hormozgan Province, Iran. According to the 2006 census, its population was 86, in 20 families.
