= Gimach =

Gimach گيمچ
- Village
- Location within Iran
- Coordinates: 26°43′09″N 57°48′44″E
- Country: Iran
- Province: Hormozgan
- County: Bashagard
- Bakhsh: Gowharan
- Rural District: Gowharan

Population (2006)
  - Total: 178
- Time zone: UTC+3:30 (IRST)
  - Summer (DST): UTC+4:30 (IRDT)

Gimach (Persian: گيمچ, also Romanized as Gīmach; also known as Gīmajg) is a village in Gowharan Rural District, Gowharan District, Bashagard County, Hormozgan Province, Iran. At the 2006 census, its population was 178, in 36 families.
