= Parangi, Iran =

Parangi پرانگي
- Village
- Location within Iran
- Coordinates: 26°19′52″N 57°37′42″E
- Country: Iran
- Province: Hormozgan
- County: Bashagard
- Bakhsh: Central
- Rural District: Jakdan

Population (2006)
  - Total: 126
- Time zone: UTC+3:30 (IRST)
  - Summer (DST): UTC+4:30 (IRDT)

Parangi (Persian: پرانگي, also Romanized as Parāngī) is a village in Jakdan Rural District, in the Central District of Bashagard County, Hormozgan Province, Iran. At the 2006 census, its population was 126, in 40 families.
