= Shahr-e Shib =

Shahr-e Shib شهرشيب
- Village
- Location within Iran
- Coordinates: 26°34′43″N 57°54′48″E
- Country: Iran
- Province: Hormozgan
- County: Bashagard
- Bakhsh: Gowharan
- Rural District: Gowharan

Population (2006)
  - Total: 209
- Time zone: UTC+3:30 (IRST)
  - Summer (DST): UTC+4:30 (IRDT)

Shahr-e Shib (Persian: شهرشيب, also Romanized as Shahr-e Shīb; also known as Shahr-e Shīv) is a village in Gowharan Rural District, Gowharan District, Bashagard County, Hormozgan Province, Iran. At the 2006 census, its population was 209, in 42 families.
