= Parapiyun =

Parapiyun پاراپيون
- Village
- Location within Iran
- Coordinates: 26°16′09″N 58°21′31″E
- Country: Iran
- Province: Hormozgan
- County: Bashagard
- Bakhsh: Gafr and Parmon
- Rural District: Gafr and Parmon

Population (2006)
  - Total: 265
- Time zone: UTC+3:30 (IRST)
  - Summer (DST): UTC+4:30 (IRDT)

Parapiyun (Persian: پاراپيون, also Romanized as Pārāpīyūn; also known as Pārāpīyan) is a village in Gafr and Parmon Rural District, Gafr and Parmon District, Bashagard County, Hormozgan Province, Iran. At the 2006 census, its population was 265, in 58 families.
