= Sagan, Iran =

Sagan سگن
- Village
- Location within Iran
- Coordinates: 26°17′29″N 58°05′19″E
- Country: Iran
- Province: Hormozgan
- County: Bashagard
- Bakhsh: Central
- Rural District: Sardasht

Population (2006)
  - Total: 161
- Time zone: UTC+3:30 (IRST)
  - Summer (DST): UTC+4:30 (IRDT)

Sagan (Persian: سگن; also known as Saghān) is a village in Sardasht Rural District, in the Central District of Bashagard County, Hormozgan Province, Iran. At the 2006 census, its population was 161, in 42 families.
