= Kuruj Kollan =

Kuruj Kollan كوروج كولن
- Village
- Location within Iran
- Coordinates: 26°27′00″N 58°21′00″E
- Country: Iran
- Province: Hormozgan
- County: Bashagard
- Bakhsh: Gafr and Parmon
- Rural District: Gafr and Parmon

Population (2006)
  - Total: 150
- Time zone: UTC+3:30 (IRST)
  - Summer (DST): UTC+4:30 (IRDT)

Kuruj Kollan (Persian: كوروج كولن, also Romanized as Kūrūj Kollān; also known as Kūrūch Kollān) is a village in Gafr and Parmon Rural District, Gafr and Parmon District, Bashagard County, Hormozgan Province, Iran. At the 2006 census, its population was 150, in 41 families.
