= Bolbolabad =

Bolbolabad (Persian: بلبل اباد) may refer to:

- Bolbolabad, Hormozgan
- Bolbolabad, Kerman
