= Kahur =

Kahur (Persian: كهور) may refer to:

- Kahur, Hormozgan
- Kahur, Sarduiyeh, Kerman Province
