= Darjak, Bashagard =

Darjak درجك
- Village
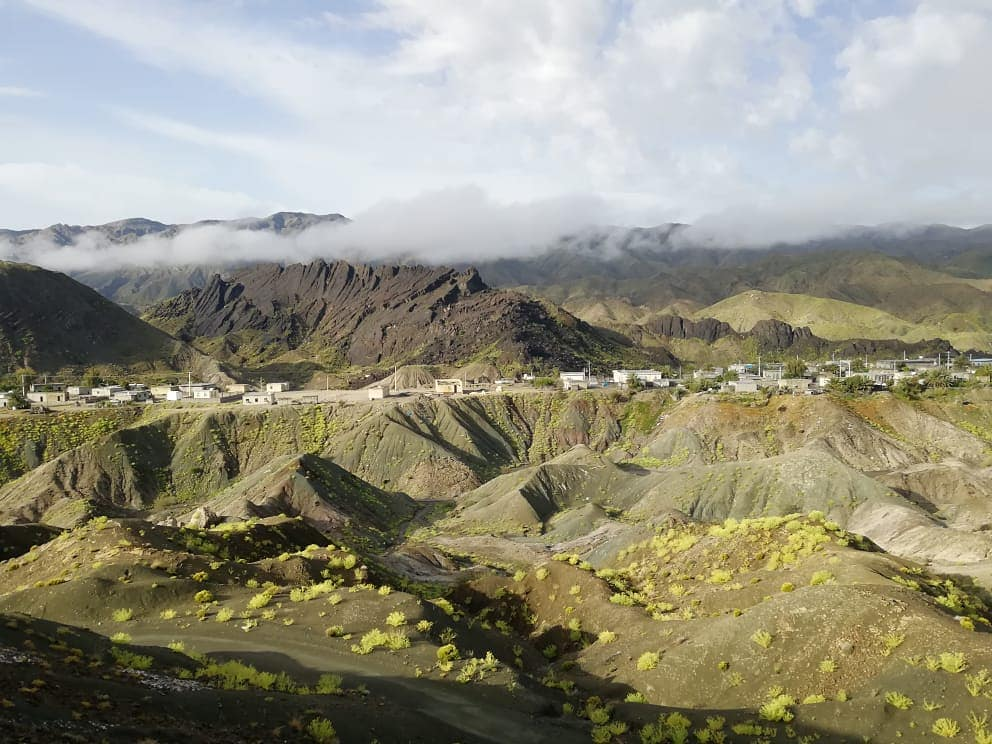

- Location within Iran
- Coordinates: 26°21′58″N 57°35′48″E
- Country: Iran
- Province: Hormozgan
- County: Bashagard
- Bakhsh: Central
- Rural District: Jakdan

Population (2006)
  - Total: 249
- Time zone: UTC+3:30 (IRST)
  - Summer (DST): UTC+4:30 (IRDT)

Darjak (Persian: درجك), also known as Darjag, is a village in Jakdan Rural District, in the Central District of Bashagard County, Hormozgan Province, Iran. According to the 2006 census, the village has a population of 249 people across 60 families.
