= Kalahu =

Kalahu or Kolahu or Kolahoo (Persian: كلاهو) may refer to:

- Kalahu, Gafr and Parmon, Hormozgan Province
- Kalahu, Gowharan, Hormozgan Province
