= Dahaneh-ye Sohrab =

Dahaneh-ye Sohrab دهنه سهراب
- Village
- Country: Iran
- Province: Hormozgan
- County: Bashagard
- Bakhsh: Central
- Rural District: Jakdan

Population (2006)
  - Total: 84
- Time zone: UTC+3:30 (IRST)
  - Summer (DST): UTC+4:30 (IRDT)

Dahaneh-ye Sohrab (Persian: دهنه سهراب, also Romanized as Dahaneh-ye Sohrāb; also known as Dehen-e Sarā) is a village in Jakdan Rural District, in the Central District of Bashagard County, Hormozgan Province, Iran. At the 2006 census, its population was 84, in 20 families.
