= Garani, Hormozgan =

Garani گاراني
- Village
- Location within Iran
- Coordinates: 26°38′52″N 57°44′38″E
- Country: Iran
- Province: Hormozgan
- County: Bashagard
- Bakhsh: Gowharan
- Rural District: Gowharan

Population (2006)
  - Total: 142
- Time zone: UTC+3:30 (IRST)
  - Summer (DST): UTC+4:30 (IRDT)

Garani (Persian: گاراني, also Romanized as Gārānī) is a village in Gowharan Rural District, Gowharan District, Bashagard County, Hormozgan Province, Iran. At the 2006 census, its population was 142, in 29 families.
