= Murdan =

Murdan or Muredan or Moordan (Persian: موردن or موردان) may refer to:

- Murdan, Hormozgan (موردن - Mūrdan)
- Murdan, Anbarabad, Kerman Province (موردان - Mūrdān)
- Murdan, Faryab, Kerman Province (موردان - Mūrdān)
- Murdan, Narmashir, Kerman Province (موردان - Mūrdān)
- Murdan, Sistan and Baluchestan (موردان - Mūrdān)
