= Darang Madu =

Village in Hormozgan province, Iran

Darang Madu Persian: درنگ مدو
- Village
- Location within Iran
- Coordinates: 26°30′21″N 58°09′25″E
- Country: Iran
- Province: Hormozgan
- County: Bashagard
- District: Gafr and Parmon
- Rural District: Parmon

Population (2016)
  - Total: 259
- Time zone: UTC+3:30 (IRST)

Darang Madu (Persian: درنگ مدو) (Note: Also romanized as Darang Madū; also known as Darang Madūnag) is a village in Parmon Rural District of Gafr and Parmon District, Bashagard County, Hormozgan province, Iran, serving as capital of both the district and the rural district.

== Demographics ==
=== Population ===
At the time of the 2006 National Census, the village's population was 234 in 42 households, when it was in Gafr and Parmon Rural District (Note: Renamed Parmon Rural District) of the former Bashagard District of Jask County. The following census in 2011 counted 321 people in 68 households, by which time the district had been separated from the county in the establishment of Bashagard County. The rural district was transferred to the new Gafr and Parmon District and renamed Parmon Rural District. The 2016 census measured the population of the village as 259 people in 70 households.
