= Bolbolabad, Hormozgan =

Bolbolabad بلبل اباد
- Village
- Location within Iran
- Coordinates: 26°24′49″N 57°39′01″E
- Country: Iran
- Province: Hormozgan
- County: Bashagard
- Bakhsh: Central
- Rural District: Jakdan

Population (2006)
  - Total: 574
- Time zone: UTC+3:30 (IRST)
  - Summer (DST): UTC+4:30 (IRDT)

Bolbolabad (Persian: بلبل اباد, also Romanized as Bolbolābād; also known as Bolbolak) is a village in Jakdan Rural District, in the Central District of Bashagard County, Hormozgan Province, Iran. At the 2006 census, its population was 574, in 120 families.
