= Zamin-e Hasan =

Zamin-e Hasan زمين حسن
- Village
- Location within Iran
- Coordinates: 26°23′54″N 58°23′16″E
- Country: Iran
- Province: Hormozgan
- County: Bashagard
- Bakhsh: Gafr and Parmon
- Rural District: Gafr and Parmon

Population (2006)
  - Total: 195
- Time zone: UTC+3:30 (IRST)
  - Summer (DST): UTC+4:30 (IRDT)

Zamin-e Hasan (Persian: زمين حسن, also Romanized as Zamīn-e Ḩasan; also known as Zemīn-e Ḩasan) is a village in Gafr and Parmon Rural District, Gafr and Parmon District, Bashagard County, Hormozgan Province, Iran. At the 2006 census, its population was 195, in 53 families.
