= Kohnab-e Pain =

Kohnab-e Pain كهناب پائين
- Village
- Location within Iran
- Coordinates: 26°35′27″N 58°03′43″E
- Country: Iran
- Province: Hormozgan
- County: Bashagard
- Bakhsh: Gowharan
- Rural District: Gowharan

Population (2006)
  - Total: 95
- Time zone: UTC+3:30 (IRST)
  - Summer (DST): UTC+4:30 (IRDT)

Kohnab-e Pain (Persian: كهناب پائين, also Romanized as Kohnāb-e Pā‘īn; also known as Kahnāb and Kohnāb) is a village in Gowharan Rural District, Gowharan District, Bashagard County, Hormozgan Province, Iran. At the 2006 census, its population was 95, in 17 families.
