= Dehendar-e Shahbabak =

Dehendar-e Shahbabak دهندر شه بابك
- Village
- Location within Iran
- Coordinates: 26°24′49″N 57°50′45″E
- Country: Iran
- Province: Hormozgan
- County: Bashagard
- Bakhsh: Central
- Rural District: Jakdan

Population (2006)
  - Total: 257
- Time zone: UTC+3:30 (IRST)
  - Summer (DST): UTC+4:30 (IRDT)

Dehendar-e Shahbabak (Persian: دهندر شه بابك, also Romanized as Dehendar-e Shahbābak) is a village in Jakdan Rural District, in the Central District of Bashagard County, Hormozgan Province, Iran. At the 2006 census, its population was 257, in 74 families.
