= Zamin-e Tuman =

Zamin-e Tuman زمين تومان
- Village
- Location within Iran
- Coordinates: 26°33′06″N 58°10′11″E
- Country: Iran
- Province: Hormozgan
- County: Bashagard
- Bakhsh: Gafr and Parmon
- Rural District: Gafr and Parmon

Population (2006)
  - Total: 107
- Time zone: UTC+3:30 (IRST)
  - Summer (DST): UTC+4:30 (IRDT)

Zamin-e Tuman (Persian: زمين تومان, also Romanized as Zamīn-e Tūmān; also known as Zamīntamān and Zatmān) is a village in Gafr and Parmon Rural District, Gafr and Parmon District, Bashagard County, Hormozgan Province, Iran. At the 2006 census, its population was 107, in 30 families.
