= Zamin-e Hansin =

Zamin-e Hansin زمين حنصين
- Village
- Location within Iran
- Coordinates: 26°16′17″N 58°17′08″E
- Country: Iran
- Province: Hormozgan
- County: Bashagard
- Bakhsh: Gafr and Parmon
- Rural District: Gafr and Parmon

Population (2006)
  - Total: 22
- Time zone: UTC+3:30 (IRST)
  - Summer (DST): UTC+4:30 (IRDT)

Zamin-e Hansin (Persian: زمين حنصين, also Romanized as Zamīn-e Ḩanşīn, Zamīn Ḩanşīn, and Zamīn Ḩansīn; also known as Zamīn-e Ḩoseyn) is a village in Gafr and Parmon Rural District, Gafr and Parmon District, Bashagard County, Hormozgan Province, Iran. At the 2006 census, its population was 22, in 6 families.
