= Renin-e Kuchek =

Renin-e Kuchek رنین کوچک
- Village
- Location within Iran
- Coordinates: 26°35′07″N 57°49′44″E
- Country: Iran
- Province: Hormozgan
- County: Bashagard
- Bakhsh: Gowharan
- Rural District: Gowharan

Population (2006)
  - Total: 89
- Time zone: UTC+3:30 (IRST)
  - Summer (DST): UTC+4:30 (IRDT)

Renin-e Kuchek (Persian: رنین کوچک, also Romanized as Renīn-e Kūcheḵ) is a village in Gowharan Rural District, Gowharan District, Bashagard County, Hormozgan Province, Iran. At the 2006 census, its population was 89, in 28 families.
