= Renin, Iran =

Renin (Persian: رنين) may refer to:

- Renin-e Bozorg
- Renin-e Kuchek
