= Sit-e Bandkharas =

Sit-e Bandkharas سيت بندخرس
- Village
- Location within Iran
- Coordinates: 26°14′37″N 58°12′33″E
- Country: Iran
- Province: Hormozgan
- County: Bashagard
- Bakhsh: Gafr and Parmon
- Rural District: Gafr and Parmon

Population (2006)
  - Total: 47
- Time zone: UTC+3:30 (IRST)
  - Summer (DST): UTC+4:30 (IRDT)

Sit-e Bandkharas (Persian: سيت بندخرس, also Romanized as Sīt-e Bandkharas; also known as Sīt) is a village in Gafr and Parmon Rural District, Gafr and Parmon District, Bashagard County, Hormozgan Province, Iran. At the 2006 census, its population was 47, in 11 families.
