= Kunek, Hormozgan =

Village in Hormozgan province, Iran

Kunek Persian: كونك
- Village
- Location within Iran
- Coordinates: 26°35′54″N 58°12′07″E
- Country: Iran
- Province: Hormozgan
- County: Bashagard
- District: Gafr and Parmon
- Rural District: Parmon

Population (2016)
  - Total: 592
- Time zone: UTC+3:30 (IRST)

Kunek (Persian: كونك) (Note: Also romanized as Kūnek; also known as Kahnak, Kohnak, and Kohnek) is a village in Parmon Rural District of Gafr and Parmon District, Bashagard County, Hormozgan province, Iran.

== Demographics ==
=== Population ===
At the time of the 2006 National Census, the village's population was 693 in 153 households, when it was in Gafr and Parmon Rural District (Note: Renamed Parmon Rural District) of the former Bashagard District of Jask County. The following census in 2011 counted 676 people in 145 households, by which time the district had been separated from the county in the establishment of Bashagard County. The rural district was transferred to the new Gafr and Parmon District and renamed Parmon Rural District. The 2016 census measured the population of the village as 592 people in 143 households. It was the most populous village in its rural district.
