= Kuruch =

Kuruch (Russian: Куруч) may refer to

- Kuruch-Karan, a rural locality (selo) in Bashkortostan, Russia
- Kuruj Kollan (also Kūrūch Kollān), a village in Iran
- Rimma Kuruch (1938–2019), Russian language educator
