= Dahandar-e Mir Amr =

Dahandar-e Mir Amr دهن درميرعمر
- Village
- Location within Iran
- Coordinates: 26°25′34″N 58°12′08″E
- Country: Iran
- Province: Hormozgan
- County: Bashagard
- Bakhsh: Gafr and Parmon
- Rural District: Gafr and Parmon

Population (2006)
  - Total: 151
- Time zone: UTC+3:30 (IRST)
  - Summer (DST): UTC+4:30 (IRDT)

Dahandar-e Mir Amr (Persian: دهن درميرعمر, also Romanized as Dahandar-e Mīr ʿAmr; also known as Dahandar) is a village in Gafr and Parmon Rural District, Gafr and Parmon District, Bashagard County, Hormozgan Province, Iran. At the 2006 census, its population was 151, in 40 families.
