= Kalahu, Gafr and Parmon =

Kalahu كلاهو
- Village
- Location within Iran
- Coordinates: 26°28′20″N 58°26′49″E
- Country: Iran
- Province: Hormozgan
- County: Bashagard
- Bakhsh: Gafr and Parmon
- Rural District: Gafr and Parmon

Population (2006)
  - Total: 26
- Time zone: UTC+3:30 (IRST)
  - Summer (DST): UTC+4:30 (IRDT)

Kalahu (Persian: كلاهو, also Romanized as Kalāhū, Kolahoo, and Kolāhū) is a village in Gafr and Parmon Rural District, Gafr and Parmon District, Bashagard County, Hormozgan Province, Iran. At the 2006 census, its population was 26, in 7 families.
