= Kohnab-e Bala, Hormozgan =

Kohnab-e Bala كهناب بالا
- Village
- Location within Iran
- Coordinates: 26°36′03″N 58°03′03″E
- Country: Iran
- Province: Hormozgan
- County: Bashagard
- Bakhsh: Gowharan
- Rural District: Gowharan

Population (2006)
  - Total: 139
- Time zone: UTC+3:30 (IRST)
  - Summer (DST): UTC+4:30 (IRDT)

Kohnab-e Bala (Persian: كهناب بالا, also Romanized as Kohnāb-e Bālā; also known as Kohnāb-e Sar) is a village in Gowharan Rural District, Gowharan District, Bashagard County, Hormozgan Province, Iran. At the 2006 census, its population was 139, in 28 families.
