= Darjak =

Darjak (Persian: درجك), also rendered as Darjag, may refer to:

- Darjak, Bashagard
- Darjak, Minab
