= Marang =

Marang may refer to:

== Plants ==
- Marang (plant), a Filipino common name for Artocarpus odoratissimus

== Places ==
- Marang (district), a district in Malaysia
  - Marang (federal constituency)
  - Marang, Terengganu, a town in Malaysia
  - Marang River, a river of Terengganu, Malaysia
- Marang, Iran, a village in Iran
- Marang, Nepal, a village in Nepal

== People ==
- Akuot Mercy Marang, South Sudanese social activist and singer
- Ido Marang (1918–1970), French field hockey player
- Marang Molosiwa (born 1992), Botswana actress

== See also ==
- Mereng, dance music and national symbol of Haiti
- Meringue, a dessert
- Merrang, a historic pastoral property in Victoria, Australia
- Morang, a district in eastern Nepal
- Murang, the Mru people who live in the border regions of Myanmar, Bangladesh and India
