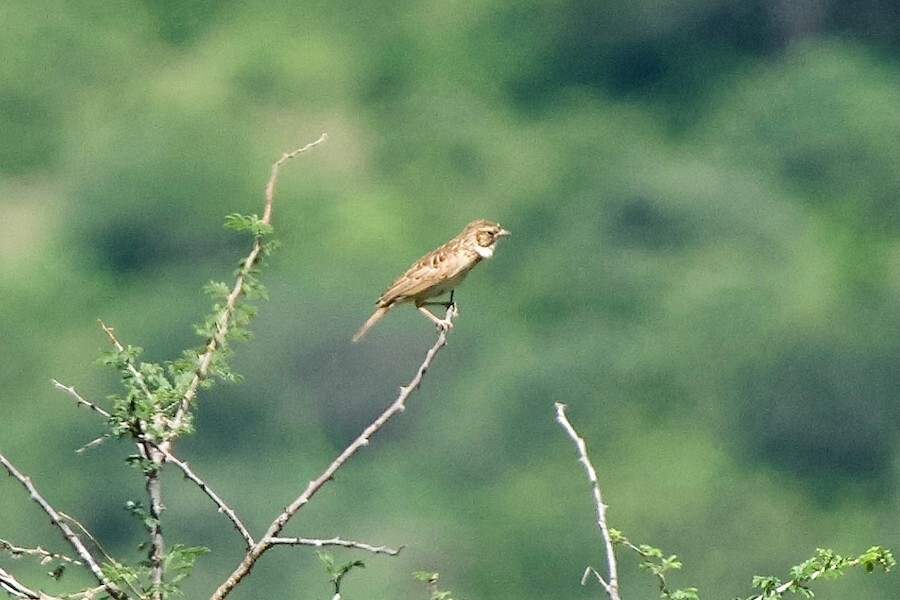

Conservation status
- Data Deficient (IUCN 3.1)

Scientific classification
- Kingdom: Animalia
- Phylum: Chordata
- Class: Aves
- Order: Passeriformes
- Family: Alaudidae
- Genus: Mirafra
- Species: M. pulpa

Binomial name
- Mirafra pulpa Friedmann, 1930
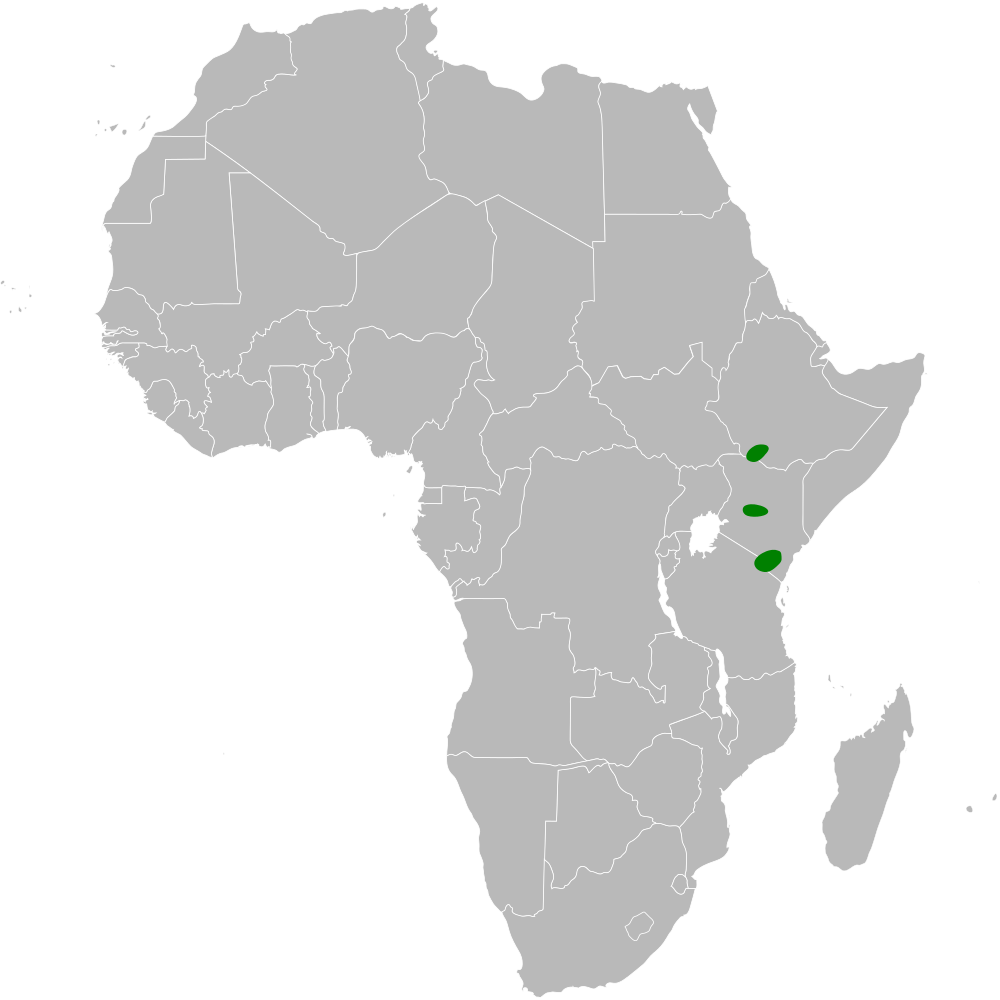

Synonyms
- Mirafra cantillans marginata

= Friedmann's lark =

Species of bird

Friedmann's lark (Mirafra pulpa) is a species of lark in the family Alaudidae found in East Africa.

== Taxonomy and systematics ==
Formerly, some authorities considered Friedmann's lark to be a subspecies of the singing bush lark. Alternate names for the species include Friedmann's bush lark, rufous lark and Sagon lark.

== Description ==
It is best identified by its distinctive song; a long, drawn-out singular note, hoo-ee-oo (with slight stress on the ee), repeated at 1 or 2 second intervals. It is heard more often at night, and given while atop a bush or during undulating display flights.

== Distribution and habitat ==
Friedmann's lark is found in southern Ethiopia, central and south-eastern Kenya, and north-eastern Tanzania, but its population and exact range are very poorly known. The type specimen was collected in Ethiopia (from the Konso-Sagan area) in 1992, having been seen only one time since, in 1998; but most of what is known comes primarily from data collected in Tsavo East and West National Parks, in Kenya. There are also a few records from Tanzania, from Mkomazi Game Reserve, south of Arusha.

In general, the natural habitats of Friedmann's lark are subtropical or tropical dry lowland grasslands. Being aloof and shy, it apparently chooses the moister (or less dry), ranker-growing of these areas, and where it can find it, those with more bush-cover. This is in contrast to the more dry, and more open environs preferred by many other species of lark.

== Behaviour and ecology ==
It is nearly always witnessed only during certain times of year (in Tanzania, during rainy season, for example), to the exclusion of other times; and often amongst other migrant species. These observations would seem to suggest that it is a migratory bird, but more corroborating data is needed to make a definitive determination.

Friedmann's lark appears to subsist mainly on small beetles, grasshoppers and other insects, as well as grass seeds.

== Cited works ==
- Phil Benstead; Stuart Butchart; Mike Evans; Pete Robertson; Malcolm Starkey; Andy Symes; John S. Ash; Neil Baker; Donald Turner (2008). "Friedmann's Lark - BirdLife Species Factsheet". Evaluators: Jeremy Bird, Stuart Butchart, Alison Stattersfield. BirdLife International.
