= Kunak (disambiguation) =

Kunak is the capital of the Kunak District in the Tawau Division of Sabah, Malaysia.

Kunak may also refer to:

- Kunak District, administrative district in the Malaysian state of Sabah
- Kunak (state constituency), state constituency in Sabah, Malaysia

== See also ==
- Kunek (disambiguation)
