= Carl Sagan (disambiguation) =

Carl Sagan (1934–1996) was an American astronomer and science communicator.

Carl Sagan may also refer to:

== Arts and entertainment ==
- Carl Sagan EP, a 2017 album by Night Moves
- "Carl Sagan", a 2010 song off the album Third Party

== Other uses ==
- Apple Power Macintosh 7100, a personal computer codenamed "Carl Sagan"

== See also ==
- Sagan (disambiguation)
- Carl (disambiguation)
