= Garani =

Garani may refer to:

- Garani, Hormozgan, Iran
- Garani, Kičevo, North Macedonia
- Granai, Afghanistan; also romanized Garani
