= Sagan =

Sagan may refer to:

== Places ==
- German name for
  - Żagań, Poland
  - Duchy of Żagań (1274–1549), one of the duchies of Silesia
- Sagan, Iran, a village in Hormozgan Province, Iran
- Sagan, West Azerbaijan, a village in West Azerbaijan Province, Iran
- Sagan, Ethiopia
- Sagan River, Ethiopia
- Şağan, Azerbaijan
- 2709 Sagan, asteroid named after Carl Sagan
- Sagan (crater), impact crater on Mars named after Carl Sagan

== People ==
- Segan, an Aramaic term for the deputy of a civil or religious leader, rendered as sagan in Hebrew
- Anna of Sagan (died 1541), duchess by marriage to Duke Charles I of Münsterberg-Oels
- Alexandra "Sasha" Sagan (born 1982), American author, television producer, and filmmaker, and Carl Sagan's daughter
- Carl Sagan (1934–1996), American astronomer, science writer, and advocate for rationalism and skepticism
- Dorion Sagan (born 1959), American writer, one of Carl Sagan's sons
- Françoise Sagan (1935–2004), French writer
- Ginetta Sagan (1925–2000), American human-rights activist
- Hedwig of Sagan (died 1390), Queen of Poland as wife of Casimir III
- Jacob Dungau Sagan (born 1946), Malaysian politician and Deputy Minister of International Trade and Industry, Malaysia
- Jeanne Sagan (born 1979), American musician, bassist for All That Remains
- Juraj Sagan (born 1988), Slovak cyclist, Peter Sagan's brother
- Leontine Sagan (1889–1974), Austrian film director and actress
- Nick Sagan (born 1970), American writer, one of Carl Sagan's sons
- Peter Sagan (born 1990), Slovak cyclist, Juraj Sagan's brother
- Scott Sagan (born 1955), professor of political science at Stanford University

== Engineering, science and technology ==
- Sagan (number), the number of stars in the observable universe
- Sagan (unit of measurement), humorous unit of measurement named after Carl Sagan
- S.A.G.A.N., social and collaborative web-platform
- Sagan (software), a high performance, multi-threaded log analysis engine

== Other ==
- Sagan (ceremony), a Nepalese sacred ritual
- Sagan (film), 2008 French film about the French writer Françoise Sagan
- Sagan Tosu, Japanese professional football club based in Tosu, Saga Prefecture

== See also ==
- Sagen (disambiguation)
