= Dar Absar Rural District =

Rural district in Hormozgan province, Iran

Dar Absar Rural District Persian: دهستان درآبسر
- Rural District
- Location within Iran
- Coordinates: 26°45′49″N 58°05′31″E
- Country: Iran
- Province: Hormozgan
- County: Bashagard
- District: Gowharan
- Capital: Khomeyni Shahr

Population (2016)
  - Total: 5,011
- Time zone: UTC+3:30 (IRST)

Dar Absar Rural District (Persian: دهستان درآبسر) is in Gowharan District of Bashagard County, Hormozgan province, Iran. Its capital is the village of Khomeyni Shahr.

== History ==
After the 2006 National Census, Bashagard District was separated from Jask County in the establishment of Bashagard County, and Dar Absar Rural District was created in the new Gowharan District.

== Demographics ==
=== Population ===
At the time of the 2011 census, the rural district's population was 5,746 in 1,179 households. The 2016 census measured the population of the rural district as 5,011 in 1,220 households. The most populous of its 31 villages was Khomeyni Shahr, with 812 people.
