= SITS =

SITS or Sits, may refer to:

- Sitting, when one sits
- Saganami Island Tactical Simulator (SITS), published by Ad Astra and set in the Honorverse
- SITS:Vision, also called "SITS", a student and course management database application
- Dario Šits (born 2004), Latvian soccer player
- Satellite image time series

== See also ==
- SIT (disambiguation), included Sit and SIT, for the singular of SITs and Sits
