= Boshnu =

Boshnu or Beshnow (Persian: بشنو) may refer to:

- Beshnow, Hormozgan
- Boshnu, Razavi Khorasan
