= Kohnab-e Bala =

Kohnab-e Bala (Persian: كهناب بالا) may refer to:

- Kohnab-e Bala, Hormozgan
- Kohnab-e Bala, Khuzestan
- Kohnab-e Bala, Kohgiluyeh and Boyer-Ahmad
