= Izar =

Izar (from the Arabic word ازار izār, 'veil') may refer to:

- Izar, Iran, a village in Hormozgan Province, Iran
- Izār, a part of the Ihram clothing worn by male pilgrims during the Islamic Hajj
- Izaar, the Arabic name of a wrap clothing item commonly worn in Arabia, the Horn of Africa, and South and Southeast Asia, known elsewhere as a futah, sarong, izār, lungi, macawwis or mundu
- Izar, a star, also known as Pulcherrima and Epsilon Boötis
- IZAR, Spanish shipbuilder; sold and renamed Navantia in 2005
- IZAR, product name for the Motorola RAZR V3xx cellular phone
