= Zamindar (disambiguation) =

Zamindar were land-owning nobility in the Indian subcontinent.

Zamindar may also refer to:

- Zamindar (newspaper), a popular and influential Muslim newspaper in the Indian subcontinent run by Zafar Ali Khan
- Zamindar (1952 film), a 1952 Tamil film
- Zamindar (1965 film), a 1965 Telugu film
- Zamindar, Iran, a village in Hormozgan Province, Iran
- Manyam Zamindar, Zamindars from the family of Manyam, belonging to the Komati Arya Vysya Caste
- Fine-Leaf Wadara, a woody plant found in South America

== Places ==
- Wadera, Ethiopia
- Adolana Wadera

== See also ==
- Zameen (disambiguation)
- Zamin (disambiguation)
