= Anarshirin =

Anarshirin or Anar-e Shirin (Persian: انارشيرين) may refer to:

- Anarshirin, Hormozgan
- Anar-e Shirin 3, Kerman Province
