= Segan (surname) =

Segan is a surname. Notable people with the surname include:

- Allison Lyon Segan, American film producer, wife of Lloyd
- Lloyd Segan, American film and television producer
- Noah Segan (born 1983), American actor

== See also ==
- Sagan (disambiguation)
