= Zameen =

Zameen (lit. 'land') may refer to:

- Zameen (1943 film), a Bollywood film
- Zameen (1987 film), an Indian film by Ramesh Sippy
- Zameen (2003 film), an Indian action thriller film
- Zameen (novel), an Urdu novel by Khadija Mastoor

== See also ==
- Zameen (film), list of films titled Zameen
- Zamin (disambiguation)
- Zameen Aasmaan (disambiguation)
- Zamindar (disambiguation)
  - Zamindar, landholders in colonial India
