= Sagen =

Sagen is a surname and a given name. This may refer to:

- Anette Sagen (born 1985), Norwegian ski jumper
- Lyder Sagen (1777–1850), Norwegian educator and author
- Rolf Sagen (1940–2017), Norwegian author, curator and daily leader of the Bergen Academy of Writing
- Steinar Sagen (born 1975), Norwegian comedian, radio host and actor
- Tore Sagen (born 1980), Norwegian comedian, radio host and actor
- Sagen Ishizuka (1850–1909), Japanese doctor who pioneered the concepts of shokuiku (food education) and the macrobiotic diet
- Sagen Maddalena (born 1993), American sport shooter

== See also ==
- Sagan (disambiguation)
