= Gowharan, Hormozgan =

City in Hormozgan province, Iran

Gowharan Persian: گوهران
- City
- Location within Iran
- Coordinates: 26°35′44″N 57°53′46″E
- Country: Iran
- Province: Hormozgan
- County: Bashagard
- District: Gowharan

Population (2016)
  - Total: 1,170
- Time zone: UTC+3:30 (IRST)

Gowharan (Persian: گوهران) (Note: Also romanized as Gowharān and Gūharān; formerly the village of Angahran, also romanized as Angohrān (انگهران); also known as Angūran (انگوران) and Qal‘eh-ye Angūrān) is a city in, and the capital of, Gowharan District of Bashagard County, Hormozgan province, Iran. It also serves as the administrative center for Gowharan Rural District. (Note: Formerly Angahran Rural District)

== Demographics ==
=== Population ===
At the time of the 2006 National Census, Gowharan's population was 828 in 199 households, when it was a village in Gowharan Rural District of the former Bashagard District of Jask County. The following census in 2011 counted 1,316 people in 298 households, by which time the district had been separated from the county in the establishment of Bashagard County. The rural district was transferred to the new Gowharan District, and Gowharan was elevated to the status of a city. The 2016 census measured the population of the city as 1,170 people in 323 households.
