= Gafr Rural District =

Rural district in Hormozgan province, Iran

Gafr Rural District Persian: دهستان گافر
- Rural District
- Location within Iran
- Coordinates: 26°14′12″N 58°32′32″E
- Country: Iran
- Province: Hormozgan
- County: Bashagard
- District: Gafr and Parmon
- Capital: Sit

Population (2016)
  - Total: 2,808
- Time zone: UTC+3:30 (IRST)

Gafr Rural District (Persian: دهستان گافر) is in Gafr and Parmon District of Bashagard County, Hormozgan province, Iran. Its capital is the village of Sit.

== History ==
After the 2006 National Census, Bashagard District was separated from Jask County in the establishment of Bashagard County, and Gafr Rural District was created in the new Gafr and Parmon District.

== Demographics ==
=== Population ===
At the time of the 2011 census, the rural district's population was 3,220 in 893 households. The 2016 census measured the population of the rural district as 2,808 in 762 households. The most populous of its 34 villages was Akharan, with 334 people.
