= Kunek =

Kunek may refer to:

- Kunek, Hormozgan, a village in Iran
- Alice Kunek (born 1991), Australian basketball player
- Other Lives (band)
