= Zamin Band =

Zamin Band زمین بند
- village
- Interactive map of Zamin Band
- Coordinates: 27°44′39″N 57°40′54″E
- Country: Iran
- Province: Kerman
- County: Kahnuj
- Bakhsh: Central
- Rural District: Deh Kahan

Population (2006)
  - Total: 275
- Time zone: UTC+3:30 (IRST)
  - Summer (DST): UTC+4:30 (IRDT)

Zamin Band (Persian: زمين بند, also Romanized as Zamīn Band) is a village in Deh Kahan Rural District, Central District, Kahnuj County, Kerman Province, Iran. At the 2006 census, its population was 275, in 59 families.
