= Sit, Minab =

Sit سيت
- Village
- Location within Iran
- Coordinates: 26°44′02″N 57°32′31″E
- Country: Iran
- Province: Hormozgan
- County: Minab
- Bakhsh: Senderk
- Rural District: Senderk

Population (2006)
  - Total: 226
- Time zone: UTC+3:30 (IRST)
  - Summer (DST): UTC+4:30 (IRDT)

Sit (Persian: سيت, also Romanized as Sīt) is a village in Senderk Rural District, Senderk District, Minab County, Hormozgan Province, Iran. At the 2006 census, its population was 226, in 55 families.
