= Darjak, Minab =

Darjak درجك
- Village
- Location within Iran
- Coordinates: 26°59′29″N 57°24′57″E
- Country: Iran
- Province: Hormozgan
- County: Minab
- Bakhsh: Senderk
- Rural District: Bondar

Population (2006)
  - Total: 266
- Time zone: UTC+3:30 (IRST)
  - Summer (DST): UTC+4:30 (IRDT)

Darjak (Persian: درجك; also known as Darjag) is a village in Bondar Rural District, Senderk District, Minab County, Hormozgan Province, Iran. At the 2006 census, its population was 266, in 62 families.
