= Kuruch-Karan =

Kuruch-Karan Куруч-Каран
- Selo
- Location within Bashkortostan Location within Russia
- Coordinates: 55°05′N 53°56′E
- Country: Russia
- Region: Bashkortostan
- District: Bakalinsky District
- Time zone: UTC+5:00

Kuruch-Karan (Russian: Куруч-Каран; Bashkir: Ҡорос-Ҡаран, Qoros-Qaran) is a rural locality (a selo) in Starokuruchevsky Selsoviet, Bakalinsky District, Bashkortostan, Russia. The population was 42 as of 2010. There is 1 street.

== Geography ==
Kuruch-Karan is located 20 km southeast of Bakaly (the district's administrative centre) by road. Bugabashevo is the nearest rural locality.
