= Dohneh, Qazvin =

Dohneh دهنه
- Village
- Location within Iran
- Coordinates: 36°30′57″N 49°05′23″E
- Country: Iran
- Province: Qazvin
- County: Qazvin
- Bakhsh: Tarom Sofla
- Rural District: Chuqur

Population (2006)
  - Total: 94
- Time zone: UTC+3:30 (IRST)
  - Summer (DST): UTC+4:30 (IRDT)

Dohneh (Persian: دهنه, also Romanized as Dahaneh, Dohīneh, Duhinah, and Dukhinakh) is a village in Chuqur Rural District, Tarom Sofla District, Qazvin County, Qazvin Province, Iran. At the 2006 census, its population was 94, in 24 families.
