= Dahaneh, South Khorasan =

Dahaneh دهنه
- Village
- Location within Iran
- Coordinates: 33°06′49.4″N 58°48′31.3″E
- Country: Iran
- Province: South Khorasan
- County: Birjand
- Bakhsh: Central
- Rural District: Fasharud

Population (2016)
  - Total: 13
- Time zone: UTC+3:30 (IRST)
  - Summer (DST): UTC+4:30 (IRDT)

Dahaneh (Persian: دهنه) is a village in Fasharud Rural District, in the Central District of Birjand County, South Khorasan Province, Iran. At the 2016 census, its population was 13, in 4 families.
