= Dahaneh Sar Asiyab =

Dahaneh Sar Asiyab دهنه سراسياب
- Village
- Country: Iran
- Province: Kerman
- County: Bam
- Bakhsh: Central
- Rural District: Howmeh

Population (2006)
  - Total: 72
- Time zone: UTC+3:30 (IRST)
  - Summer (DST): UTC+4:30 (IRDT)

Dahaneh Sar Asiyab (Persian: دهنه سراسياب, also Romanized as Dahaneh Sar Asīyāb) is a village in Howmeh Rural District, in the Central District of Bam County, Kerman Province, Iran. At the 2006 census, its population was 72, across 20 families.
