= Dahaneh-ye Ghowri =

- Location in Afghanistan
- Coordinates: 35°54′27″N 68°29′38″E
- Country: Afghanistan
- Province: Baghlan Province
- Time zone: + 4.30

Dahaneh-ye Ghowri is a village in Baghlan Province in north eastern Afghanistan.

== See also ==
- Baghlan Province
