= Sardasht, Hormozgan =

City in Hormozgan province, Iran

Sardasht Persian: سردشت
- City
- Location within Iran
- Coordinates: 26°27′19″N 57°53′59″E
- Country: Iran
- Province: Hormozgan
- County: Bashagard
- District: Central

Population (2016)
  - Total: 1,725
- Time zone: UTC+3:30 (IRST)

Sardasht (Persian: سردشت) (Note: Also known as Sardasht-e Bashākerd) is an Iranian city in the Central District of Bashagard County, in the southern Hormozgan province, serving as capital of both the county and the district. It is also the administrative center for Sardasht Rural District.

== Demographics ==
=== Population ===
At the time of the 2006 National Census, Sardasht's population was 928 in 204 households, when it was a village in Sardasht Rural District of the former Bashagard District of Jask County. The following census in 2011 counted 1,536 people in 256 households, by which time the district had been separated from the county in the establishment of Bashagard County. The rural district was transferred to the new Central District, and Sardasht was elevated to the status of a city as the county's capital. The 2016 census measured the population of the city as 1,725 people in 391 households.
