= Sakan =

Sakan ساكان
- Village
- Location within Iran
- Coordinates: 37°53′28″N 44°45′34″E
- Country: Iran
- Province: West Azerbaijan
- County: Urmia
- Bakhsh: Sumay-ye Beradust
- Rural District: Sumay-ye Shomali

Population (2006)
  - Total: 182
- Time zone: UTC+3:30 (IRST)
  - Summer (DST): UTC+4:30 (IRDT)

Sakan (Persian: ساكان, also Romanized as Sākān; also known as Sagān) is a village in Sumay-ye Shomali Rural District, Sumay-ye Beradust District, Urmia County, West Azerbaijan Province, Iran. At the 2006 census, its population was 182, in 35 families.
