= Dahaneh-e Zurak =

Dahaneh-e Zurak دهنه زورک
- Village
- Location within Iran
- Coordinates: 28°56′59″N 57°39′30″E
- Country: Iran
- Province: Kerman
- County: Jiroft
- Bakhsh: Sarduiyeh
- Rural District: Dalfard

Population (2006)
  - Total: 605
- Time zone: UTC+3:30 (IRST)
  - Summer (DST): UTC+4:30 (IRDT)

Dahaneh-e Zurak (Persian: دهنه زورک, also Romanized as Dahaneh-e Zūrak; also known as Eslāmābād) is a village in Dalfard Rural District, Sarduiyeh District, Jiroft County, Kerman Province, Iran. At the 2006 census, its population was 605, in 101 families.
