= Zamin-e Siah =

Zamin-e Siah زمين سياه
- Village
- Location within Iran
- Coordinates: 27°54′23″N 56°44′39″E
- Country: Iran
- Province: Hormozgan
- County: Hajjiabad
- Bakhsh: Fareghan
- Rural District: Ashkara

Population (2006)
  - Total: 161
- Time zone: UTC+3:30 (IRST)
  - Summer (DST): UTC+4:30 (IRDT)

Zamin-e Siah (Persian: زمين سياه, also Romanized as Zamīn-e Sīāh and Zamīn-e Seyāh) is a village in Ashkara Rural District, Fareghan District, Hajjiabad County, Hormozgan Province, Iran. At the 2006 census, its population was 161, comprising 43 families.
