= SITS:Vision =

SITS:Vision, also known just as SITS, is a database application used for course and student management in further and higher education institutions, developed and maintained by the Tribal Group. It is currently used by roughly 70% of the UK higher education sector as well as international institutions such as the University of Sydney and the University of Otago.

== History ==
SITS has been in existence since 1991 and was first developed by a former Registrar and IT Director of a UK university. The company, Strategic Information Technology Services, started in a residential property in Beverley, East Yorkshire before moving to commercial property in Middleton-on-the-Wolds. The business moved to Hessle, East Yorkshire, in 1997 and into the current premises in Hesslewood in 2000. SITS was acquired by Tribal Group PLC [TRB.L] in 2004.

== E:Vision ==
E:Vision (sometimes styled as eVision or e:Vision), is a web-based interface designed to interact with the SITS client.

It was created with the intention of allowing users to design web-based interfaces for student and/or staff interaction. This has the advantage of allowing the user to circumvent the SITS client which some customers find cumbersome.

E:Vision interfaces are created using the traditional SITS client, but does not come as a standard component when purchasing SITS. The two basic type of interfaces that can be created are 'tasks' and 'vistas' - the former allowing workflows to be created wherein a user might complete a process or operation, the latter offers an area in which data can be viewed and edited.

== Institutions that use SITS:Vision ==
=== In the United Kingdom ===
- Arts University Bournemouth
- Adam Smith College
- Anglia Ruskin University
- Arden University
- Aston University
- Bath Spa University
- Birkbeck College
- Birmingham City University
- Bournemouth University
- University of Brighton
- Brunel University of London
- Cardiff University
- City St. George's, University of London
- Courtauld Institute of Art
- Cranfield University
- University of Cumbria
- Dundee & Angus College
- Falmouth University
- Guildhall School of Music and Drama
- Keele University
- King's College London
- Kingston University
- Liverpool Hope University
- Liverpool Institute for Performing Arts
- London Metropolitan University
- London School of Economics and Political Science
- London School of Hygiene and Tropical Medicine
- Northumbria University
- Norwich University of the Arts
- Queen Mary University of London
- Ravensbourne University London
- Regent's University London
- Robert Gordon University
- Royal Veterinary College
- Saint Marys University Twickenham
- Swansea University
- Sheffield Hallam University
- Teesside University
- UK College of Business and Computing
- University College of Estate Management
- University of the Arts London
- University of Abertay
- University of Bath
- University of Bedfordshire
- University of Bolton
- University of Bristol
- University of Bradford
- University of Chester
- University of Chichester
- University College London
- University for the Creative Arts
- University of Dundee
- University of East Anglia
- University of East London
- University of Exeter
- University of Gloucestershire
- University of Huddersfield
- University of Hull
- University of Kent
- University of London
- University of Leicester
- University of Oxford
- University of Portsmouth
- University of Reading
- University of Sheffield
- University of St Andrews
- University of Stirling
- University of Sunderland
- University of Surrey
- University of Sussex
- University of the Highlands and Islands
- University of Wales Trinity Saint David
- University of Warwick
- University of Westminster
- University of the West of England
- University of Winchester
- University of Wolverhampton
- University of Worcester
- University of York
- York St. John University

=== Outside the United Kingdom ===
- British University Vietnam, Vietnam
- Central European University, Austria
- Trinity College Dublin, Ireland
- University of Malta, Malta
- Massey University, New Zealand
- University of Otago, New Zealand
- University of Waikato, New Zealand
- University of Sydney, Australia
- RMIT University, Australia
- Universiti Teknologi PETRONAS, Malaysia
- University of Malaya, Malaysia
- University of Limerick, Ireland
- University of British Columbia, Canada
- Xi'an Jiaotong-Liverpool University, China
- Osloskolen, Norway
