= Dahaneh-ye Abshuiyeh =

Dahaneh-ye Abshuiyeh دهنه ابشوييه
- Village
- Location within Iran
- Coordinates: 28°18′19″N 57°02′00″E
- Country: Iran
- Province: Kerman
- County: Faryab
- Bakhsh: Central
- Rural District: Hur

Population (2006)
  - Total: 286
- Time zone: UTC+3:30 (IRST)
  - Summer (DST): UTC+4:30 (IRDT)

Dahaneh-ye Abshuiyeh (Persian: دهنه ابشوييه, also romanized as Dahaneh-ye Ābshū’īyeh; also known as Dahaneh-ye Ābshūeeyeh) is a village in Hur Rural District, in the Central District of Faryab County, Kerman province, Iran. At the 2006 census, its population was 286, in 76 families.
