= Dahaneh-ye Khargan =

Dahaneh-ye Khargan دهنه خارگان
- Village
- Country: Iran
- Province: Kerman
- County: Manujan
- Bakhsh: Aseminun
- Rural District: Deh Kahan

Population (2006)
  - Total: 23
- Time zone: UTC+3:30 (IRST)
  - Summer (DST): UTC+4:30 (IRDT)

Dahaneh-ye Khargan (Persian: دهنه خارگان, also Romanized as Dahaneh-ye Khārgān) is a village in Deh Kahan Rural District, Aseminun District, Manujan County, Kerman Province, Iran. At the 2006 census, its population was 23, in 4 families.
