= Dahaneh-ye Chah =

Dahaneh-ye Chah دهنه چاه
- Village
- Location within Iran
- Coordinates: 32°44′35″N 59°50′30″E
- Country: Iran
- Province: South Khorasan
- County: Sarbisheh
- Bakhsh: Central
- Rural District: Momenabad

Population (2006)
  - Total: 101
- Time zone: UTC+3:30 (IRST)
  - Summer (DST): UTC+4:30 (IRDT)

Dahaneh-ye Chah (Persian: دهنه چاه, also romanized as Dahaneh-ye Chāh and Dahaneh Chāh; also known as Kalāteh-ye Dahaneh-ye Chāh and Kalāteh Daheneh Chāh) is a village in Momenabad Rural District, in the Central District of Sarbisheh County, South Khorasan Province, Iran. According to the 2006 census, it had a population of 101 in 33 families.
