= Dahaneh-ye Chahal =

Dahaneh-ye Chahal دهنه چهل
- Village
- Location within Iran
- Coordinates: 35°57′07″N 60°13′25″E
- Country: Iran
- Province: Razavi Khorasan
- County: Mashhad
- Bakhsh: Razaviyeh
- Rural District: Pain Velayat

Population (2006)
  - Total: 191
- Time zone: UTC+3:30 (IRST)
  - Summer (DST): UTC+4:30 (IRDT)

Dahaneh-ye Chahal (Persian: دهنه چهل; also known as Dahaneh-ye Jahl and Qāsemābād) is a village in Pain Velayat Rural District, Razaviyeh District, Mashhad County, Razavi Khorasan Province, Iran. At the 2006 census, its population was 191, in 45 families.
