= Zamin-e Taghuk =

Zamin-e Taghuk زمين طاغوك
- Village
- Country: Iran
- Province: Kerman
- County: Jiroft
- Bakhsh: Sarduiyeh
- Rural District: Sarduiyeh

Population (2006)
  - Total: 58
- Time zone: UTC+3:30 (IRST)
  - Summer (DST): UTC+4:30 (IRDT)

Zamin-e Taghuk (Persian: زمين طاغوك, also Romanized as Zamīn-e Ţāghūk) is a village in Sarduiyeh Rural District, Sarduiyeh District, Jiroft County, Kerman Province, Iran. At the 2006 census, its population was 58, in 15 families.
