= Zamin-e Anjir =

Zamin-e Anjir زمين انجير
- Village
- Location within Iran
- Coordinates: 29°17′25″N 56°57′45″E
- Country: Iran
- Province: Kerman
- County: Rabor
- Bakhsh: Hanza
- Rural District: Javaran

Population (2006)
  - Total: 110
- Time zone: UTC+3:30 (IRST)
  - Summer (DST): UTC+4:30 (IRDT)

Zamin-e Anjir (Persian: زمين انجير, also Romanized as Zamīn-e Anjīr and Zamīn Anjīr) is a village in Javaran Rural District, Hanza District, Rabor County, Kerman Province, Iran. At the 2006 census, its population was 110, in 26 families.
