= Dahaneh-ye Tavarkan =

Dahaneh-ye Tavarkan دهنه توركن
- Village
- Location within Iran
- Coordinates: 28°03′36″N 56°49′49″E
- Country: Iran
- Province: Hormozgan
- County: Hajjiabad
- Bakhsh: Ahmadi
- Rural District: Kuh Shah

Population (2006)
  - Total: 44
- Time zone: UTC+3:30 (IRST)
  - Summer (DST): UTC+4:30 (IRDT)

Dahaneh-ye Tavarkan (Persian: دهنه توركن) is a village in Kuh Shah Rural District, Ahmadi District, Hajjiabad County, Hormozgan Province, Iran. At the time of the 2006 census, ten families lived in the village, which had a total population of 44.
