= Dahaneh-ye Bagh =

Dahaneh-ye Bagh دهنه باغ
- Village
- Location within Iran
- Coordinates: 28°20′15″N 58°40′46″E
- Country: Iran
- Province: Kerman
- County: Rigan
- Bakhsh: Central
- Rural District: Gavkan

Population (2006)
  - Total: 30
- Time zone: UTC+3:30 (IRST)
  - Summer (DST): UTC+4:30 (IRDT)

Dahaneh-ye Bagh (Persian: دهنه باغ, also Romanized as Dahaneh-ye Bāgh and Dahaneh-e Bāgh) is a village in Gavkan Rural District, in the Central District of Rigan County, Kerman Province, Iran. At the 2006 census, its population was 30, in 9 families.
