= Dahaneh-ye Heydari =

Dahaneh-ye Heydari دهنه حيدري
- Village
- Location within Iran
- Coordinates: 36°35′05″N 58°34′49″E
- Country: Iran
- Province: Razavi Khorasan
- County: Nishapur
- Bakhsh: Central
- Rural District: Binalud

Population (2006)
  - Total: 51
- Time zone: UTC+3:30 (IRST)
  - Summer (DST): UTC+4:30 (IRDT)

Dahaneh-ye Heydari (Persian: دهنه حيدري, also Romanized as Dahaneh-ye Ḩeydarī) is a village in Binalud Rural District, in the Central District of Nishapur County, Razavi Khorasan Province, Iran. At the 2006 census, its population was 51, in 15 families.
