= Zamin-e Molla =

Zamin-e Molla زمين ملا
- Village
- Location within Iran
- Coordinates: 26°40′01″N 57°07′41″E
- Country: Iran
- Province: Hormozgan
- County: Minab
- Bakhsh: Byaban
- Rural District: Bemani

Population (2006)
  - Total: 58
- Time zone: UTC+3:30 (IRST)
  - Summer (DST): UTC+4:30 (IRDT)

Zamin-e Molla (Persian: زمين ملا, also Romanized as Zamīn-e Mollā and Zamīn Mollā) is a village in Bemani Rural District, Byaban District, Minab County, Hormozgan Province, Iran. At the 2006 census, its population was 58, in 11 families.
