= Zamin Lashkari =

Zamin Lashkari زمين لشكري
- Village
- Location within Iran
- Coordinates: 25°45′04″N 57°45′30″E
- Country: Iran
- Province: Hormozgan
- County: Jask
- Bakhsh: Central
- Rural District: Jask

Population (2006)
  - Total: 321
- Time zone: UTC+3:30 (IRST)
  - Summer (DST): UTC+4:30 (IRDT)

Zamin Lashkari (Persian: زمين لشكري, also Romanized as Zamīn Lashkarī; also known as Zamīn Lashgarī) is a village in Jask Rural District, in the Central District of Jask County, Hormozgan Province, Iran. At the 2006 census, its population was 321, in 61 families.
