= Bolbolabad, Kerman =

Bolbolabad بلبل اباد
- Village
- Location within Iran
- Coordinates: 27°38′38″N 57°57′15″E
- Country: Iran
- Province: Kerman
- County: Qaleh Ganj
- Bakhsh: Central
- Rural District: Qaleh Ganj

Population (2006)
  - Total: 420
- Time zone: UTC+3:30 (IRST)
  - Summer (DST): UTC+4:30 (IRDT)

Bolbolabad (Persian: بلبل اباد, also Romanized as Bolbolābād) is a village in Qaleh Ganj Rural District, in the Central District of Qaleh Ganj County, Kerman Province, Iran. At the 2006 census, its population was 420, in 80 families.
