= Dahaneh-ye Ab Dar =

Dahaneh-ye Ab Dar دهنه ابدر
- Village
- Location within Iran
- Coordinates: 30°14′13″N 55°16′23″E
- Country: Iran
- Province: Kerman
- County: Shahr-e Babak
- Bakhsh: Central
- Rural District: Meymand

Population (2006)
  - Total: 47
- Time zone: UTC+3:30 (IRST)
  - Summer (DST): UTC+4:30 (IRDT)

Dahaneh-ye Ab Dar (Persian: دهنه ابدر, also Romanized as Dahaneh-ye Āb Dar; also known as Dahaneh and Dam-e Dahaneh-ye Ābdar) is a village in Meymand Rural District, in the Central District of Shahr-e Babak County, Kerman Province, Iran. At the 2006 census, its population was 47, in 10 families.
