= Sagan, Ethiopia =

Sagan is a town in southern Ethiopia. Located in the Southern Nations, Nationalities, and Peoples Region, this town has a latitude and longitude of 05°35′N 37°46′E with an elevation of 1066 meters above sea level. It is named after the nearby Sagan River, a tributary of the Weito.

An elementary school building was constructed in Sagan with assistance from Sweden through ESBU. The school was opened in 1966

== Demographics ==
Based on figures from the Central Statistical Agency in 2005, Sagan has an estimated total population of 5,335 of whom 2,592 are men and 2,743 are women. The 1994 national census reported this town had a total population of 2,944 of whom 1,435 were males and 1,509 were females. It is one of three towns in Konso special woreda.
