= Sardasht Rural District (Bashagard County) =

Rural district in Hormozgan province, Iran

Sardasht Rural District Persian: دهستان سردشت
- Rural District
- Location within Iran
- Coordinates: 26°20′54″N 57°54′00″E
- Country: Iran
- Province: Hormozgan
- County: Bashagard
- District: Central
- Capital: Sardasht

Population (2016)
  - Total: 1,898
- Time zone: UTC+3:30 (IRST)

Sardasht Rural District (Persian: دهستان سردشت) is in the Central District of Bashagard County, Hormozgan province, Iran. It is administered from the city of Sardasht.

== Demographics ==
=== Population ===
At the time of the 2006 National Census, the rural district's population (as a part of the former Bashagard District of Jask County) was 2,172 in 474 households. There were 1,805 inhabitants in 496 households at the following census of 2011, by which time the district had been separated from the county in the establishment of Bashagard County. The rural district was transferred to the new Central District. The 2016 census measured the population of the rural district as 1,898 in 527 households. The most populous of its 17 villages was Molkan, with 685 people.
