= Dahandar, Tukahur =

Dahandar دهن در
- Village
- Location within Iran
- Coordinates: 27°09′41″N 57°32′55″E
- Country: Iran
- Province: Hormozgan
- County: Minab
- Bakhsh: Tukahur
- Rural District: Cheraghabad

Population (2006)
  - Total: 122
- Time zone: UTC+3:30 (IRST)
  - Summer (DST): UTC+4:30 (IRDT)

Dahandar (Persian: دهن در; also known as Dahaneh-ye Dahandar) is a village in Cheraghabad Rural District, Tukahur District, Minab County, Hormozgan Province, Iran. At the 2006 census, its population was 122, in 32 families.
