= Zamindar, Iran =

Zamindar زمين در
- Village
- Location within Iran
- Coordinates: 26°30′08″N 57°40′23″E
- Country: Iran
- Province: Hormozgan
- County: Minab
- Bakhsh: Senderk
- Rural District: Dar Pahn

Population (2006)
  - Total: 210
- Time zone: UTC+3:30 (IRST)
  - Summer (DST): UTC+4:30 (IRDT)

Zamindar (Persian: زمين در, also Romanized as Zamīndar) is a village in Dar Pahn Rural District, Senderk District, Minab County, Hormozgan Province, Iran. At the 2006 census, its population was 210, in 45 families.
