= Bashagard District =

Former district in Hormozgan province, Iran

Bashagard District Persian: بخش بشاگرد
- Former District
- Location within Iran
- Coordinates: 26°30′00″N 58°13′30″E
- Country: Iran
- Province: Hormozgan
- County: Jask
- Capital: Angahran

Population (2006)
  - Total: 31,235
- Time zone: UTC+3:30 (IRST)

Bashagard District (Persian: بخش بشاگرد) is a former administrative division of Jask County, Hormozgan province, Iran. Its capital was the village of Angahran, now the city of Gowharan.

== History ==
After the 2006 National Census, the district was separated from the county in the establishment of Bashagard County.

== Demographics ==
=== Population ===
At the time of the 2006 census, the district's population was 31,235 in 7,174 households.

=== Administrative divisions ===
Bashagard District Population
Administrative Divisions	2006
Gafr and Parmon RD	7,968
Gowharan RD (Note: Formerly Angahran Rural District)	13,017
Jakdan RD	8,078
Sardasht RD	2,172
Total	31,235
RD = Rural District
