= Jakdan Rural District =

Rural district in Hormozgan province, Iran

Jakdan Rural District Persian: دهستان جكدان
- Rural District
- Location within Iran
- Coordinates: 26°21′12″N 57°36′51″E
- Country: Iran
- Province: Hormozgan
- County: Bashagard
- District: Central
- Capital: Jakdan

Population (2016)
  - Total: 10,053
- Time zone: UTC+3:30 (IRST)

Jakdan Rural District (Persian: دهستان جكدان) is in the Central District of Bashagard County, Hormozgan province, Iran. Its capital is the village of Jakdan.

== Demographics ==
=== Population ===
At the time of the 2006 National Census, the rural district's population (as a part of the former Bashagard District of Jask County) was 8,078 in 1,861 households. There were 11,700 inhabitants in 2,841 households at the following census of 2011, by which time the district had been separated from the county in the establishment of Bashagard County. The rural district was transferred to the new Central District. The 2016 census measured the population of the rural district as 10,053 in 2,705 households. The most populous of its 46 villages was Jakdan, with 1,239 people.
