= Central District (Bashagard County) =

District in Hormozgan province, Iran

Central District (Bashagard County) Persian: بخش مرکزی شهرستان بشاگرد
- District
- Location within Iran
- Coordinates: 26°20′54″N 57°45′24″E
- Country: Iran
- Province: Hormozgan
- County: Bashagard
- Capital: Sardasht

Population (2016)
  - Total: 13,676
- Time zone: UTC+3:30 (IRST)

The Central District of Bashagard County (Persian: بخش مرکزی شهرستان بشاگرد) is in Hormozgan province, Iran. Its capital is the city of Sardasht.

== History ==
After the 2006 National Census, Bashagard District was separated from Jask County in the establishment of Bashagard County, which was divided into three districts of two rural districts each, with Sardasht as its capital.

== Demographics ==
=== Population ===
At the time of the 2011 census, the district's population was 15,041 people in 3,593 households. The 2016 census measured the population of the district as 13,676 inhabitants in 3,623 households.

=== Administrative divisions ===
Central District (Bashagard County) Population
Administrative Divisions	2011	2016
Jakdan RD	11,700	10,053
Sardasht RD	1,805	1,898
Sardasht (city)	1,536	1,725
Total	15,041	13,676
RD = Rural District
