= Gafr and Parmon District =

District in Hormozgan province, Iran

Gafr and Parmon District Persian: بخش گافر و پارمون
- District
- Location within Iran
- Coordinates: 26°23′06″N 58°32′32″E
- Country: Iran
- Province: Hormozgan
- County: Bashagard
- Capital: Darang Madu

Population (2016)
  - Total: 7,260
- Time zone: UTC+3:30 (IRST)

Gafr and Parmon District (Persian: بخش گافر و پارمون) is in Bashagard County, Hormozgan province, Iran. Its capital is the village of Darang Madu.

== History ==
After the 2006 National Census, Bashagard District was separated from Jask County in the establishment of Bashagard County, which was divided into three districts of two rural districts each, with the city of Sardasht as its capital.

== Demographics ==
=== Population ===
At the time of the 2011 census, the district's population was 8,478 people in 2,228 households. The 2016 census measured the population of the district as 7,260 inhabitants in 1,938 households.

=== Administrative divisions ===
Gafr and Parmon District Population
Administrative Divisions	2011	2016
Gafr RD	3,220	2,808
Parmon RD (Note: Formerly Gafr and Parmon Rural District)	5,258	4,452
Total	8,478	7,260
RD = Rural District
