= Parmon Rural District =

Rural district in Hormozgan province, Iran

Parmon Rural District Persian: دهستان پارمون
- Rural District
- Location within Iran
- Coordinates: 26°30′13″N 58°29′11″E
- Country: Iran
- Province: Hormozgan
- County: Bashagard
- District: Gafr and Parmon
- Capital: Darang Madu

Population (2016)
  - Total: 4,452
- Time zone: UTC+3:30 (IRST)

Parmon Rural District (Persian: دهستان پارمون) (Note: Formerly Gafr and Parmon Rural District (دهستان گافر و پارمون)) is in Gafr and Parmon District of Bashagard County, Hormozgan province, Iran. Its capital is the village of Darang Madu.

== Demographics ==
=== Population ===
At the time of the 2006 National Census, the rural district's population (as Gafr and Parmon Rural District of the former Bashagard District of Jask County) was 7,968 in 1,933 households. There were 5,258 inhabitants in 1,335 households at the following census of 2011, by which time the district had been separated from the county in the establishment of Bashagard County. The rural district was transferred to the new Gafr and Parmon District and renamed Parmon Rural District. The 2016 census measured the population of the rural district as 4,452 in 1,176 households. The most populous of its 42 villages was Kunek, with 592 people.
