= Gowharan District =

District in Hormozgan province, Iran

Gowharan District Persian: بخش گوهران
- District
- Location within Iran
- Coordinates: 26°45′00″N 58°04′09″E
- Country: Iran
- Province: Hormozgan
- County: Bashagard
- Capital: Gowharan

Population (2016)
  - Total: 14,149
- Time zone: UTC+3:30 (IRST)

Gowharan District (Persian: بخش گوهران) is in Bashagard County, Hormozgan province, Iran. Its capital is the city of Gowharan. (Note: Formerly the village of Angahran)

== History ==
After the 2006 National Census, Bashagard District was separated from Jask County in the establishment of Bashagard County, which was divided into three districts of two rural districts each, with the city of Sardasht as its capital.

== Demographics ==
=== Population ===
At the time of the 2011 census, the district's population was 16,488 people in 3,779 households. The 2016 census measured the population of the district as 14,149 inhabitants in 3,798 households.

=== Administrative divisions ===
Gowharan District Population
| Administrative Divisions | 2011 | 2016 |
|---|---|---|
| Dar Absar RD | 5,746 | 5,011 |
| Gowharan RD (Note: Formerly Angahran Rural District) | 9,426 | 7,968 |
| Gowharan (city) | 1,316 | 1,170 |
| Total | 16,488 | 14,149 |
RD = Rural District
