= Gowharan Rural District (Bashagard County) =

Rural district in Hormozgan province, Iran

Gowharan Rural District Persian: دهستان گوهران
- Rural District
- Location within Iran
- Coordinates: 26°43′19″N 57°53′39″E
- Country: Iran
- Province: Hormozgan
- County: Bashagard
- District: Gowharan
- Capital: Gowharan

Population (2016)
  - Total: 7,968
- Time zone: UTC+3:30 (IRST)

Gowharan Rural District (Persian: دهستان گوهران) (Note: Formerly Angahran Rural District (دهستان انگهران)) is in Gowharan District of Bashagard County, Hormozgan province, Iran. It is administered from the city of Gowharan. (Note: Formerly the village of Angahran)

== Demographics ==
=== Population ===
At the time of the 2006 National Census, the rural district's population (as a part of the former Bashagard District of Jask County) was 13,017 in 2,906 households. There were 9,426 inhabitants in 2,302 households at the following census of 2011, by which time the district had been separated from the county in the establishment of Bashagard County. The rural district was transferred to the new Gowharan District. The 2016 census measured the population of the rural district as 7,968 in 2,255 households. The most populous of its 48 villages was Pahetek, with 503 people.
