= Bashagard County =

County in Hormozgan province, Iran

Bashagard County Persian: شهرستان بشاگرد
- County
- Location of Bashagard County in Hormozgan province (right, yellow)

- Location of Hormozgan province in Iran
- Coordinates: 26°30′00″N 58°13′30″E
- Country: Iran
- Province: Hormozgan
- Capital: Sardasht
- Districts: Central, Gafr and Parmon, Gowharan

Area
  - Total: 8,747 km^{2} (3,377 sq mi)

Population (2016)
  - Total: 35,085
  - Density: 4.011/km^{2} (10.39/sq mi)
- Time zone: UTC+3:30 (IRST)

Bashagard County (Persian: شهرستان بشاگرد) is in Hormozgan province, in southern Iran. Its capital is the city of Sardasht.

== History ==
After the 2006 National Census, Bashagard District was separated from Jask County in the establishment of Bashagard County, which was divided into three districts of two rural districts each, with Sardasht as its capital.

== Demographics ==
=== Population ===
At the time of the 2011 census, the county's population was 40,007 people in 9,571 households. The 2016 census measured the population of the county as 35,085 in 9,359 households.

=== Administrative divisions ===
Bashagard County's population history and administrative structure over two consecutive censuses are shown in the following table.

Bashagard County Population
Administrative Divisions	2011	2016
Central District	15,041	13,676
Jakdan RD	11,700	10,053
Sardasht RD	1,805	1,898
Sardasht (city)	1,536	1,725
Gafr and Parmon District	8,478	7,260
Gafr RD	3,220	2,808
Parmon RD (Note: Formerly Gafr and Parmon Rural District)	5,258	4,452
Gowharan District	16,488	14,149
Dar Absar RD	5,746	5,011
Gowharan RD (Note: Formerly Angahran Rural District)	9,426	7,968
Gowharan (city) (Note: Formerly the village of Angahran)	1,316	1,170
Total	40,007	35,085
RD = Rural District

== Climate ==
Bashagard experiences cold winters and hot, dry summers, but the climate is more tolerable in areas that are nearer to the mountains. Garlic from the county is of extremely high quality because it is aromatic, sharp, and pungent. Dates are one of the county's most significant agricultural products. Pomegranates and figs are among the available seasonal fruits.

== Agriculture ==
Wild cherry (also known as bestel, which is especially crucial for treating anemia in medicine), bitter almonds, wild pistachios, and cumin are some of the other goods produced in the highlands throughout the various seasons. Wild edible mushrooms, also referred to as "Akhur" locally, are a highly favored and nutrient-dense food that flourishes in the highlands during the winter. Bashagard honey is of the highest quality and is exported to nations along the Persian Gulf as well as further abroad.

== See also ==
Media related to Bashagard County at Wikimedia Commons
