= Cheraghabad =

Cheraghabad (Persian: چراغ اباد) may refer to:

- Cheraghabad, Hormozgan
- Cheraghabad-e Bala, Hormozgan Province
- Cheraghabad-e Jonubi, Hormozgan Province
- Cheraghabad-e Markazi, Hormozgan Province
- Cheraghabad, Kerman
- Cheraghabad, Manujan, Kerman Province
- Cheraghabad, Rudbar-e Jonubi, Kerman Province
- Cheraghabad-e Chah Log, Kerman Province
- Cheraghabad, Kermanshah
- Cheraghabad, Firuzabad, Kermanshah County, Kermanshah Province
- Cheraghabad, Sahneh, Kermanshah Province
- Cheraghabad, Kurdistan
- Cheraghabad, Qorveh, Kurdistan Province
- Cheraghabad, Lorestan
- Charaghabad Pir Dusti, Lorestan Province, Iran
- Cheraghabad, Sistan and Baluchestan
- Cheraghabad Cham Nus, Lorestan Province, Iran
- Cheraghabad-e Olya, Lorestan Province, Iran
- Cheraghabad-e Sofla, Lorestan Province, Iran
- Cheraghabad Rural District, in Hormozgan Province, Iran
