= Tiab =

Tiab or Tiyab or Teyab (Persian: تياب) may refer to:

== Places ==
Iran

- Tiab, Fars, Fars province
- Tiab, Hajjiabad, Hormozgan province
- Tiab, Minab, Hormozgan province
- Tiab (27°18′ N 57°38′ E), Manujan, Kerman province
- Tiab (27°30′ N 57°41′ E), Manujan, Kerman province
- Tiab, Sistan and Baluchestan
- Tiab District, in Hormozgan province
- Tiab Rural District, in Hormozgan province
