= Kalatak =

Kalatak (Persian: كلاتك) may refer to:

- Kalatak, Bandar Abbas, Hormozgan Province
- Kalatak, Minab, Hormozgan Province
- Kalatak Sar, Hormozgan Province
- Kalatak, Kerman
- Kalatak, Kohgiluyeh and Boyer-Ahmad
- Kalatak, Mehrestan, Sistan and Baluchestan
- Kalatak, Saravan, Sistan and Baluchestan
