= Sarmast, Hormozgan =

Village in Hormozgan province, Iran

Sarmast Persian: سرمست
- Village
- Location within Iran
- Coordinates: 26°59′40″N 57°05′22″E
- Country: Iran
- Province: Hormozgan
- County: Minab
- District: Band-e Zarak
- Rural District: Kargan

Population (2016)
  - Total: 1,454
- Time zone: UTC+3:30 (IRST)

Sarmast (Persian: سرمست) is a village in, and the capital of, Kargan Rural District of Band-e Zarak District, Minab County, Hormozgan province, Iran. The previous capital of the rural district was the village of Kargan, now a city.

== Demographics ==
=== Population ===
At the time of the 2006 National Census, the village's population was 1,269 in 245 households, when it was in Band-e Zarak Rural District of the Central District. The following census in 2011 counted 1,274 people in 282 households, by which time the rural district had been separated from the district in the formation of Band-e Zarak District. Sarmast was transferred to Kargan Rural District created in the new district. The 2016 census measured the population of the village as 1,454 people in 355 households.
