= Sarbaran =

Village in Hormozgan province, Iran

Sarbaran Persian: سرباران
- Village
- Location within Iran
- Coordinates: 27°10′32″N 56°57′32″E
- Country: Iran
- Province: Hormozgan
- County: Minab
- District: Tiyab
- Rural District: Sarbaran

Population (2016)
  - Total: 620
- Time zone: UTC+3:30 (IRST)

Sarbaran (Persian: سرباران) (Note: Also romanized as Sarbārān; also known as Sārebānān) is a village in, and the capital of, Sarbaran Rural District of Tiyab District, Minab County, Hormozgan province, Iran.

== Demographics ==
=== Population ===
At the time of the 2006 National Census, the village's population was 618 in 109 households, when it was in Tiyab Rural District of the Central District. The following census in 2011 counted 675 people in 152 households. The 2016 census measured the population of the village as 620 people in 164 households.

After the census, the rural district was separated from the district in the formation of Tiyab District. Sarbaran was transferred to Sarbaran Rural District created in the new district.
