= Kahnan-e Sarney =

Kahnan-e Sarney كهنان سرني
- Village
- Location within Iran
- Coordinates: 27°04′43″N 57°21′48″E
- Country: Iran
- Province: Hormozgan
- County: Minab
- Bakhsh: Tukahur
- Rural District: Tukahur

Population (2006)
  - Total: 1,144
- Time zone: UTC+3:30 (IRST)
  - Summer (DST): UTC+4:30 (IRDT)

Kahnan-e Sarney (Persian: كهنان سرني, also Romanized as Kahnān-e Sarney, Kahanān Sarney, Kahnān-e Sarnī, and Kahnān-e Sorney) is a village in Tukahur Rural District, Tukahur District, Minab County, Hormozgan Province, Iran. At the 2006 census, its population was 1,144, in 263 families.
