= Baghuni =

Baghuni باغوني
- Village
- Location within Iran
- Coordinates: 27°11′00″N 56°57′59″E
- Country: Iran
- Province: Hormozgan
- County: Minab
- Bakhsh: Central
- Rural District: Tiab

Population (2006)
  - Total: 318
- Time zone: UTC+3:30 (IRST)
  - Summer (DST): UTC+4:30 (IRDT)

Baghuni (Persian: باغوني, also Romanized as Bāghūnī) is a village in Tiab Rural District, in the Central District of Minab County, Hormozgan Province, Iran. At the 2006 census, its population was 318, in 58 families.
