= Qalamzani =

Qalamzani قلم زنی
- Village
- Location within Iran
- Coordinates: 27°03′00″N 57°20′24″E
- Country: Iran
- Province: Hormozgan
- County: Minab
- Bakhsh: Central
- Rural District: Karian

Population (2006)
  - Total: 282
- Time zone: UTC+3:30 (IRST)
  - Summer (DST): UTC+4:30 (IRDT)

Qalamzani (Persian: قلم زنی, also Romanized as Qalamzanī) is a village in Karian Rural District, in the Central District of Minab County, Hormozgan Province, Iran. At the 2006 census, its population was 282, in 60 families.
