= Miskanak =

Miskanak ميسكنك
- Village
- Location within Iran
- Coordinates: 27°01′20″N 57°02′14″E
- Country: Iran
- Province: Hormozgan
- County: Minab
- Bakhsh: Central
- Rural District: Band-e Zarak

Population (2006)
  - Total: 260
- Time zone: UTC+3:30 (IRST)
  - Summer (DST): UTC+4:30 (IRDT)

Miskanak (Persian: ميسكنك, also Romanized as Mīskanak; also known as Meskanak and Mīs Kan) is a village in Band-e Zarak Rural District, in the Central District of Minab County, Hormozgan Province, Iran. At the 2006 census, its population was 260, in 57 families.
