= Mahmud Shahi =

Mahmud Shahi محمودشاهي
- Village
- Location within Iran
- Coordinates: 27°10′04″N 56°58′36″E
- Country: Iran
- Province: Hormozgan
- County: Minab
- Bakhsh: Central
- Rural District: Tiab

Population (2006)
  - Total: 77
- Time zone: UTC+3:30 (IRST)
  - Summer (DST): UTC+4:30 (IRDT)

Mahmud Shahi (Persian: محمودشاهي, also Romanized as Maḩmūd Shāhī; also known as Maḩmūd Shādī) is a village in Tiab Rural District, in the Central District of Minab County, Hormozgan Province, Iran. At the 2006 census, its population was 77, in 14 families.
