= Tom Malantaki =

Tom Malantaki تم ملنتكي
- Village
- Country: Iran
- Province: Hormozgan
- County: Minab
- Bakhsh: Tukahur
- Rural District: Cheraghabad

Population (2006)
  - Total: 623
- Time zone: UTC+3:30 (IRST)
  - Summer (DST): UTC+4:30 (IRDT)

Tom Malantaki (Persian: تم ملنتكي, also Romanized as Tom Malantakī) is a village in Cheraghabad Rural District, Tukahur District, Minab County, Hormozgan Province, Iran. At the 2006 census, its population was 623, in 121 families.
