= Pabanan =

Pabanan پابنان
- Village
- Location within Iran
- Coordinates: 27°03′18″N 57°19′35″E
- Country: Iran
- Province: Hormozgan
- County: Minab
- Bakhsh: Central
- Rural District: Karian

Population (2006)
  - Total: 140
- Time zone: UTC+3:30 (IRST)
  - Summer (DST): UTC+4:30 (IRDT)

Pabanan (Persian: پابنان, also Romanized as Pābanān) is a village in Karian Rural District, in the Central District of Minab County, Hormozgan Province, Iran. At the 2006 census, its population was 140, in 35 families.
