= Mazegh =

Mazegh or Mazagh (Persian: مازغ), also rendered as Mazigh or Maziq, may refer to:

- Mazegh, Rudan, Rudan County, Hormozgan Province, Iran
- Mazagh-e Kurian, Minab County, Hormozgan Province, Iran
- Mazegh-e Bala, Minab County, Hormozgan Province, Iran
- Mazegh-e Pain, Minab County, Hormozgan Province, Iran
