= Talang-e Saratak =

Village in Hormozgan province, Iran

Talang-e Saratak Persian: تلنگ سراتك
- Village
- Location within Iran
- Coordinates: 26°53′39″N 57°12′35″E
- Country: Iran
- Province: Hormozgan
- County: Minab
- District: Kariyan
- Rural District: Talang

Population (2016)
  - Total: 732
- Time zone: UTC+3:30 (IRST)

Talang-e Saratak (Persian: تلنگ سراتك) (Note: Also romanized as Talang-e Sarātaḵ) is a village in, and the capital of, Talang Rural District of Kariyan District, Minab County, Hormozgan province, Iran. Talang is a non-seasonal fruit and has predominantly contributed to the production of vegetables.

== Demographics ==
=== Population ===
At the time of the 2006 National Census, the village's population was 602 in 127 households, when it was in Kariyan Rural District of the Central District. The following census in 2011 counted 659 people in 164 households. The 2016 census measured the population of the village as 732 people in 191 households.

After the census, the rural district was separated from the district in the formation of Kariyan District. Talang-e Saratak was transferred to Talang Rural District created in the district.
