= Rigak =

Rigak (Persian: ريگك) may refer to:

- Rigak, Chaharmahal and Bakhtiari
- Rigak, Hormozgan
- Rigak, Kerman
