= Sarkontkan =

Sarkontkan سركنتكان
- Village
- Location within Iran
- Coordinates: 27°11′40″N 57°00′00″E
- Country: Iran
- Province: Hormozgan
- County: Minab
- Bakhsh: Central
- Rural District: Howmeh

Population (2006)
  - Total: 162
- Time zone: UTC+3:30 (IRST)
  - Summer (DST): UTC+4:30 (IRDT)

Sarkontkan (Persian: سركنتكان, also Romanized as Sarkontkān; also known as Sarkontān) is a village in Howmeh Rural District, in the Central District of Minab County, Hormozgan Province, Iran. At the 2006 census, its population was 162, in 29 families.
