= Rig Muled =

Rig Muled ريگ مولد
- Village
- Location within Iran
- Coordinates: 27°08′09″N 57°23′38″E
- Country: Iran
- Province: Hormozgan
- County: Minab
- Bakhsh: Tukahur
- Rural District: Tukahur

Population (2006)
  - Total: 463
- Time zone: UTC+3:30 (IRST)
  - Summer (DST): UTC+4:30 (IRDT)

Rig Muled (Persian: ريگ مولد, also Romanized as Rīg Mūled; also known as Rīgmūlet) is a village in Tukahur Rural District, Tukahur District, Minab County, Hormozgan Province, Iran. At the 2006 census, its population was 463, in 101 families.
