= Qalaman-e Abdollah =

Qalaman-e Abdollah قلمان عبداله
- Village
- Country: Iran
- Province: Hormozgan
- County: Minab
- Bakhsh: Central
- Rural District: Karian

Population (2006)
  - Total: 50
- Time zone: UTC+3:30 (IRST)
  - Summer (DST): UTC+4:30 (IRDT)

Qalaman-e Abdollah (Persian: قلمان عبداله, also Romanized as Qalamān-e ʿAbdollah) is a village in Karian Rural District, in the Central District of Minab County, Hormozgan Province, Iran. At the 2006 census, its population was 50, in 11 families.
