= Poshteh-ye Azadegan =

Poshteh-ye Azadegan پشته آزادگان
- Village
- Location within Iran
- Coordinates: 27°13′15″N 57°03′20″E
- Country: Iran
- Province: Hormozgan
- County: Minab
- Bakhsh: Central
- Rural District: Howmeh

Population (2006)
  - Total: 1,128
- Time zone: UTC+3:30 (IRST)
  - Summer (DST): UTC+4:30 (IRDT)

Poshteh-ye Azadegan (Persian: پشته ازادكان, also Romanized as Poshteh-ye Āzādegān) is a village in Howmeh Rural District, in the Central District of Minab County, Hormozgan Province, Iran. At the 2006 census, its population was 1,128, in 238 families.
