= Kolahi =

Village in Hormozgan province, Iran

Kolahi Persian: كلاهي
- Village
- Location within Iran
- Coordinates: 27°03′32″N 56°52′24″E
- Country: Iran
- Province: Hormozgan
- County: Minab
- District: Tiyab
- Rural District: Tiyab

Population (2016)
  - Total: 5,686
- Time zone: UTC+3:30 (IRST)

Kolahi (Persian: كلاهي) (Note: Also romanized as Kolāhī) is a village in Tiyab Rural District of Tiyab District, Minab County, Hormozgan province, Iran.

== Demographics ==
=== Population ===
At the time of the 2006 National Census, the village's population was 4,537 in 886 households, when it was in the Central District. The following census in 2011 counted 5,284 people in 1,228 households. The 2016 census measured the population of the village as 5,686 people in 1,390 households. It was the most populous village in its rural district.

After the census, the rural district was separated from the district in the formation of Tiyab District.
