= Rig Deraz =

Village in Hormozgan, Iran

Rig Deraz ريگ دراز
- Village
- Location within Iran
- Coordinates: 27°10′06″N 57°25′35″E
- Country: Iran
- Province: Hormozgan
- County: Minab
- Bakhsh: Tukahur
- Rural District: Cheraghabad

Population (2006)
  - Total: 786
- Time zone: UTC+3:30 (IRST)
  - Summer (DST): UTC+4:30 (IRDT)

Rig Deraz (Persian: ريگ دراز, also Romanized as Rīg Derāz) is a village in Cheraghabad Rural District, Tukahur District, Minab County, Hormozgan Province, Iran. At the 2006 census, its population was 786, in 166 families.
