= Dalalun =

Dalalun دلالون
- Village
- Location within Iran
- Coordinates: 27°09′37″N 56°56′52″E
- Country: Iran
- Province: Hormozgan
- County: Minab
- Bakhsh: Central
- Rural District: Tiab

Population (2006)
  - Total: 99
- Time zone: UTC+3:30 (IRST)
  - Summer (DST): UTC+4:30 (IRDT)

Dalalun (Persian: دلالون, also Romanized as Dalālūn; also known as Dalālan, Delālān, and Delālon) is a village in Tiab Rural District, in the Central District of Minab County, Hormozgan Province, Iran. At the 2006 census, its population was 99, in 21 families.
