= Kalentan =

Kalentan كلنتان
- Village
- Location within Iran
- Coordinates: 27°08′31″N 57°02′27″E
- Country: Iran
- Province: Hormozgan
- County: Minab
- Bakhsh: Central
- Rural District: Howmeh

Population (2006)
  - Total: 456
- Time zone: UTC+3:30 (IRST)
  - Summer (DST): UTC+4:30 (IRDT)

Kalentan (Persian: كلنتان, also Romanized as Kalentān and Kalantān) is a village in Howmeh Rural District, in the Central District of Minab County, Hormozgan Province, Iran. At the 2006 census, its population was 456, in 110 families.
