= Poshteh-ye Mohnu =

Poshteh-ye Mohnu پشته مهنو
- Village
- Location within Iran
- Coordinates: 27°13′07″N 57°03′25″E
- Country: Iran
- Province: Hormozgan
- County: Minab
- Bakhsh: Central
- Rural District: Howmeh

Population (2006)
  - Total: 1,313
- Time zone: UTC+3:30 (IRST)
  - Summer (DST): UTC+4:30 (IRDT)

Poshteh-ye Mohnu (Persian: پشته مهنو, also Romanized as Poshteh-ye Mohnū) is a village in Howmeh Rural District, in the Central District of Minab County, Hormozgan Province, Iran. At the 2006 census, its population was 1,313, in 268 families.
