= Koshtaran =

Koshtaran كشتاران
- Village
- Location within Iran
- Coordinates: 26°52′40″N 57°10′18″E
- Country: Iran
- Province: Hormozgan
- County: Minab
- Bakhsh: Central
- Rural District: Karian

Population (2006)
  - Total: 420
- Time zone: UTC+3:30 (IRST)
  - Summer (DST): UTC+4:30 (IRDT)

Koshtaran (Persian: كشتاران, also Romanized as Koshtārān; also known as Koshtāvān) is a village in Karian Rural District, in the Central District of Minab County, Hormozgan Province, Iran. At the 2006 census, its population was 420, in 78 families.
