= Deh-e Vosta =

Deh-e Vosta دهوسطي
- Village
- Location within Iran
- Coordinates: 27°09′37″N 57°01′47″E
- Country: Iran
- Province: Hormozgan
- County: Minab
- Bakhsh: Central
- Rural District: Howmeh

Population (2006)
  - Total: 546
- Time zone: UTC+3:30 (IRST)
  - Summer (DST): UTC+4:30 (IRDT)

Deh-e Vosta (Persian: دهوسطي, also Romanized as Deh-e Vosţá and Deh Vosţá) is a village in Howmeh Rural District, in the Central District of Minab County, Hormozgan Province, Iran. At the 2006 census, its population was 546, in 115 families.
