= Shomjuiyeh =

Shomjuiyeh شمجوئيه
- Village
- Country: Iran
- Province: Hormozgan
- County: Minab
- Bakhsh: Central
- Rural District: Band-e Zarak

Population (2006)
  - Total: 113
- Time zone: UTC+3:30 (IRST)
  - Summer (DST): UTC+4:30 (IRDT)

Shomjuiyeh (Persian: شمجوئيه, also Romanized as Shomjūīyeh) is a village in Band-e Zarak Rural District, in the Central District of Minab County, Hormozgan Province, Iran. At the 2006 census, its population was 113, in 23 families.
