= Hamin, Iran =

Village in Hormozgan, Iran

Hamin هامين
- Village
- Location within Iran
- Coordinates: 27°09′23″N 57°24′51″E
- Country: Iran
- Province: Hormozgan
- County: Minab
- Bakhsh: Tukahur
- Rural District: Cheraghabad

Population (2006)
  - Total: 821
- Time zone: UTC+3:30 (IRST)
  - Summer (DST): UTC+4:30 (IRDT)

Hamin (Persian: هامين, also Romanized as Ḩāmīn) is a village in Cheraghabad Rural District, Tukahur District, Minab County, Hormozgan Province, Iran. At the 2006 census, its population was 821, in 183 families.
