= Dom Shahr =

Dom Shahr دمشهر
- Village
- Location within Iran
- Coordinates: 27°16′13″N 57°00′46″E
- Country: Iran
- Province: Hormozgan
- County: Minab
- Bakhsh: Central
- Rural District: Gurband

Population (2006)
  - Total: 1,806
- Time zone: UTC+3:30 (IRST)
  - Summer (DST): UTC+4:30 (IRDT)

Dom Shahr (Persian: دمشهر, also Romanized as Domshahr; also known as Dovom Shahr and Dumshehr) is a village in Gurband Rural District, in the Central District of Minab County, Hormozgan Province, Iran. At the 2006 census, its population was 1,806, in 383 families.
