= Gishnu =

Gishnu گيشنو
- Village
- Location within Iran
- Coordinates: 27°07′25″N 56°58′33″E
- Country: Iran
- Province: Hormozgan
- County: Minab
- Bakhsh: Central
- Rural District: Tiab

Population (2006)
  - Total: 109
- Time zone: UTC+3:30 (IRST)
  - Summer (DST): UTC+4:30 (IRDT)

Gishnu (Persian: گيشنو, also Romanized as Gīshnū) is a village in Tiab Rural District, in the Central District of Minab County, Hormozgan Province, Iran. At the 2006 census, its population was 109, in 24 families.
