= Anjirak, Hormozgan =

Anjirak انجيرك
- Village
- Location within Iran
- Coordinates: 27°06′28″N 57°24′47″E
- Country: Iran
- Province: Hormozgan
- County: Minab
- Bakhsh: Tukahur
- Rural District: Tukahur

Population (2006)
  - Total: 736
- Time zone: UTC+3:30 (IRST)
  - Summer (DST): UTC+4:30 (IRDT)

Anjirak (Persian: انجيرك, also Romanized as Anjīrak) is a village in Tukahur Rural District, Tukahur District, Minab County, Hormozgan Province, Iran. At the 2006 census, its population was 736, in 139 families.
