= Gorazuiyeh =

Gorazuiyeh گرازوئيه
- Village
- Location within Iran
- Coordinates: 27°02′53″N 57°00′23″E
- Country: Iran
- Province: Hormozgan
- County: Minab
- Bakhsh: Central
- Rural District: Band-e Zarak

Population (2006)
  - Total: 896
- Time zone: UTC+3:30 (IRST)
  - Summer (DST): UTC+4:30 (IRDT)

Gorazuiyeh (Persian: گرازوئيه, also Romanized as Gorāzū’īyeh) is a village in Band-e Zarak Rural District, in the Central District of Minab County, Hormozgan Province, Iran. At the 2006 census, its population was 896, in 174 families.
