= Tombanu =

Tombanu تمبانو
- Village
- Location within Iran
- Coordinates: 27°07′58″N 57°03′20″E
- Country: Iran
- Province: Hormozgan
- County: Minab
- Bakhsh: Central
- Rural District: Howmeh

Population (2006)
  - Total: 815
- Time zone: UTC+3:30 (IRST)
  - Summer (DST): UTC+4:30 (IRDT)

Tombanu (Persian: تمبانو, also Romanized as Tombānū; also known as Tonbānū) is a village in Howmeh Rural District, in the Central District of Minab County, Hormozgan Province, Iran. At the 2006 census, its population was 815, in 149 families.
