= Baziari =

Baziari بازياري
- Village
- Location within Iran
- Coordinates: 27°10′18″N 57°02′23″E
- Country: Iran
- Province: Hormozgan
- County: Minab
- Bakhsh: Central
- Rural District: Howmeh

Population (2006)
  - Total: 1,330
- Time zone: UTC+3:30 (IRST)
  - Summer (DST): UTC+4:30 (IRDT)

Baziari (Persian: بازياري, also Romanized as Bāzīārī) is a village in Howmeh Rural District, in the Central District of Minab County, Hormozgan Province, Iran. At the 2006 census, its population was 1,330, in 253 families.
