= Mah Khatuni, Hormozgan =

Mah Khatuni ماه خاتوني
- Village
- Location within Iran
- Coordinates: 27°10′54″N 56°57′35″E
- Country: Iran
- Province: Hormozgan
- County: Minab
- Bakhsh: Central
- Rural District: Tiab

Population (2006)
  - Total: 177
- Time zone: UTC+3:30 (IRST)
  - Summer (DST): UTC+4:30 (IRDT)

Mah Khatuni (Persian: ماه خاتوني, also Romanized as Māh Khātūnī and Mah Khatooni) is a village in Tiab Rural District, in the Central District of Minab County, Hormozgan Province, Iran. At the 2006 census, its population was 177, in 35 families.
