= Talang =

Talang may refer to:

- The word Talang means "talent" in Swedish.
- Mount Talang, an active volcano in West Sumatra, Indonesia
- Talang, Iran, a village in Sistan and Baluchestan province, Iran
- Talang-e Anbari, a village in Hormozgan province, Iran
- Talang-e Saratak, a village in Hormozgan province, Iran
- Talang Rural District (Minab County), an administrative division of Hormozgan province, Iran
- Talang Rural District (Qasr-e Qand County), an administrative division of Sistan and Baluchestan province, Iran
- a district in Phuket Province, Thailand
- a district in Candaba, Pampanga, Philippines
- Talang (Swedish TV series), a Swedish television show based on Got Talent
