= Paziarat =

Paziarat پازيارت
- Village
- Location within Iran
- Coordinates: 27°10′53″N 56°59′12″E
- Country: Iran
- Province: Hormozgan
- County: Minab
- Bakhsh: Central
- Rural District: Howmeh

Population (2006)
  - Total: 331
- Time zone: UTC+3:30 (IRST)
  - Summer (DST): UTC+4:30 (IRDT)

Paziarat (Persian: پازيارت, also Romanized as Pāzīārat, Pā Zeyārat, and Pā Zīārat) is a village in Howmeh Rural District, in the Central District of Minab County, Hormozgan Province, Iran. At the 2006 census, its population was 331, in 59 families.
