= Sangaki =

Sangaki سنگكي
- Village
- Location within Iran
- Coordinates: 27°00′51″N 57°03′18″E
- Country: Iran
- Province: Hormozgan
- County: Minab
- Bakhsh: Central
- Rural District: Band-e Zarak

Population (2006)
  - Total: 306
- Time zone: UTC+3:30 (IRST)
  - Summer (DST): UTC+4:30 (IRDT)

Sangaki (Persian: سنگكي, also Romanized as Sangakī; also known as Gūlokh Kalam, Kolūkh-e Kalam, and Kolūkh Kalam) is a village in Band-e Zarak Rural District, in the Central District of Minab County, Hormozgan Province, Iran. At the 2006 census, its population was 306, in 53 families.
