= Poshteh-ye Aliabad =

Poshteh-ye Aliabad پشته علي اباد
- Village
- Location within Iran
- Coordinates: 27°12′08″N 57°03′50″E
- Country: Iran
- Province: Hormozgan
- County: Minab
- Bakhsh: Central
- Rural District: Howmeh

Population (2006)
  - Total: 2,050
- Time zone: UTC+3:30 (IRST)
  - Summer (DST): UTC+4:30 (IRDT)

Poshteh-ye Aliabad (Persian: پشته علي اباد, also Romanized as Poshteh-ye ʿAlīābād) is a village in Howmeh Rural District, in the Central District of Minab County, Hormozgan Province, Iran. At the 2006 census, its population was 2,050, in 429 families.
