= Molla Jamati =

Molla Jamati ملاجماتي
- Village
- Location within Iran
- Coordinates: 27°08′10″N 57°01′26″E
- Country: Iran
- Province: Hormozgan
- County: Minab
- Bakhsh: Central
- Rural District: Howmeh

Population (2006)
  - Total: 406
- Time zone: UTC+3:30 (IRST)
  - Summer (DST): UTC+4:30 (IRDT)

Molla Jamati (Persian: ملاجماتي, also Romanized as Mollā Jamātī) is a village in Howmeh Rural District, in the Central District of Minab County, Hormozgan Province, Iran. At the 2006 census, its population was 406, in 80 families.
