= Chah Heydar, Hormozgan =

Chah Heydar چاه حيدر
- Village
- Country: Iran
- Province: Hormozgan
- County: Minab
- Bakhsh: Tukahur
- Rural District: Tukahur

Population (2006)
  - Total: 265
- Time zone: UTC+3:30 (IRST)
  - Summer (DST): UTC+4:30 (IRDT)

Chah Heydar (Persian: چاه حيدر, also Romanized as Chāh Ḩeydar) is a village in Tukahur Rural District, Tukahur District, Minab County, Hormozgan Province, Iran. At the 2006 census, its population was 265, in 56 families.
