= Tombak-e Bala =

Tombek-e Bala تمبك بالا
- Village
- Location within Iran
- Coordinates: 27°05′58″N 56°59′38″E
- Country: Iran
- Province: Hormozgan
- County: Minab
- Bakhsh: Central
- Rural District: Howmeh

Population (2006)
  - Total: 10
- Time zone: UTC+3:30 (IRST)
  - Summer (DST): UTC+4:30 (IRDT)

Tombek-e Bala (Persian: تمبك بالا, also Romanized as Tombek-e Bālā; also known as Tombek is a village in Howmeh Rural District, in the Central District of Minab County, Hormozgan Province, Iran. At the 2006 census, its population was 10, in 4 families.
