= Berenzaki =

Berenzaki برنزكي
- Village
- Location within Iran
- Coordinates: 27°02′00″N 57°19′46″E
- Country: Iran
- Province: Hormozgan
- County: Minab
- Bakhsh: Central
- Rural District: Karian

Population (2006)
  - Total: 65
- Time zone: UTC+3:30 (IRST)
  - Summer (DST): UTC+4:30 (IRDT)

Berenzaki (Persian: برنزكي, also Romanized as Berenzakī or Berenzáki) is a village in Karian Rural District, in the Central District of Minab County, Hormozgan Province, Iran. At the 2006 census, its population was 65 in 13 families.
