= Golshavar, Minab =

Golshavar گلشوار
- Village
- Location within Iran
- Coordinates: 27°09′02″N 57°01′37″E
- Country: Iran
- Province: Hormozgan
- County: Minab
- Bakhsh: Central
- Rural District: Howmeh

Population (2006)
  - Total: 458
- Time zone: UTC+3:30 (IRST)
  - Summer (DST): UTC+4:30 (IRDT)

Golshavar (Persian: گلشوار, also Romanized as Golshavār, Golashvār, and Goleshvār; also known as Gūshvār) is a village in Howmeh Rural District, in the Central District of Minab County, Hormozgan Province, Iran. At the 2006 census, its population was 458, in 87 families.
