= Qader Khani =

Qader Khani قادرخاني
- Village
- Location within Iran
- Coordinates: 26°58′06″N 57°06′40″E
- Country: Iran
- Province: Hormozgan
- County: Minab
- Bakhsh: Central
- Rural District: Band-e Zarak

Population (2006)
  - Total: 542
- Time zone: UTC+3:30 (IRST)
  - Summer (DST): UTC+4:30 (IRDT)

Qader Khani (Persian: قادرخاني, also Romanized as Qāder Khānī) is a village in Band-e Zarak Rural District, in the Central District of Minab County, Hormozgan Province, Iran. At the 2006 census, its population was 542, in 102 families.
