= Shahvarpalur =

Shahvarpalur شهوارپالور
- Village
- Location within Iran
- Coordinates: 27°12′28″N 57°03′37″E
- Country: Iran
- Province: Hormozgan
- County: Minab
- Bakhsh: Central
- Rural District: Howmeh

Population (2006)
  - Total: 1,147
- Time zone: UTC+3:30 (IRST)
  - Summer (DST): UTC+4:30 (IRDT)

Shahvarpalur (Persian: شهوارپالور, also Romanized as Shahvārpālūr; also known as Shahvār) is a village in Howmeh Rural District, in the Central District of Minab County, Hormozgan Province, Iran. At the 2006 census, its population was 1,147, in 225 families.
