= Mashahran =

Mashahran ماهشهران
- Village
- Location within Iran
- Coordinates: 27°09′08″N 56°57′44″E
- Country: Iran
- Province: Hormozgan
- County: Minab
- Bakhsh: Central
- Rural District: Tiab

Population (2006)
  - Total: 464
- Time zone: UTC+3:30 (IRST)
  - Summer (DST): UTC+4:30 (IRDT)

Mashahran (Persian: ماهشهران, also Romanized as Māshahrān and Māshehrān; also known as Māh Shahrān and Māshahrān-e Now) is a village in Tiab Rural District, in the Central District of Minab County, Hormozgan Province, Iran. At the 2006 census, its population was 464, in 91 families.
