= Nakhl-e Ebrahimi =

Village in Hormozgan province, Iran

Nakhl-e Ebrahimi Persian: نخل ابراهيمي
- Village
- Location within Iran
- Coordinates: 27°07′53″N 56°55′00″E
- Country: Iran
- Province: Hormozgan
- County: Minab
- District: Tiyab
- Rural District: Tiyab

Population (2016)
  - Total: 2,094
- Time zone: UTC+3:30 (IRST)

Nakhl-e Ebrahimi (Persian: نخل ابراهيمي) (Note: Also romanized as Nakhl-e Ebrāhīmī and Nakhl Ebrāhīmī; also known as Nakhl Ebrāhīm and Nakhl-e-Ebrāhīm) is a village in, and the capital of, Tiyab Rural District of Tiyab District, Minab County, Hormozgan province, Iran. The previous capital of the rural district was the village of Tiyab.

== Demographics ==
=== Population ===
At the time of the 2006 National Census, the village's population was 1,883 in 378 households, when it was in the Central District. The following census in 2011 counted 1,972 people in 481 households. The 2016 census measured the population of the village as 2,094 people in 606 households.

After the census, the rural district was separated from the district in the formation of Tiyab District.
