= Gur Band =

Gur Band or Gurband (Persian: گوربند) may refer to:

- Gurband, Hormozgan, in Hormozgan Province, Iran
- Gur Band, Razavi Khorasan, in Razavi Khorasan Province, Iran
- Gur Band, Sistan and Baluchestan, in Sistan and Baluchestan Province, Iran
- Gurband Rural District, in Hormozgan Province
