= Nil Gary =

Nil Gary نيل گرئ
- Village
- Interactive map of Nil Gary
- Country: Iran
- Province: Hormozgan
- County: Minab
- Bakhsh: Tukahur
- Rural District: Cheraghabad

Population (2006)
  - Total: 289
- Time zone: UTC+3:30 (IRST)
  - Summer (DST): UTC+4:30 (IRDT)

Nil Gary (Persian: نيل گرئ, also Romanized as Nīl Gary) is a village in Cheraghabad Rural District, Tukahur District, Minab County, Hormozgan Province, Iran. At the 2006 census, its population was 289, in 56 families.
