= Hasht Bandi-ye Do =

Hasht Bandi-ye Do هشت بندي دو
- Village
- Location within Iran
- Coordinates: 27°06′46″N 57°27′18″E
- Country: Iran
- Province: Hormozgan
- County: Minab
- Bakhsh: Tukahur
- Rural District: Cheraghabad

Population (2006)
  - Total: 1,876
- Time zone: UTC+3:30 (IRST)
  - Summer (DST): UTC+4:30 (IRDT)

Hasht Bandi-ye Do (Persian: هشت بندي دو, also Romanized as Hasht Bandī-ye Do) is a village in Cheraghabad Rural District, Tukahur District, Minab County, Hormozgan Province, Iran. At the 2006 census, its population was 1,876, in 396 families.
