= Khvajeh Shamsi =

Khvajeh Shamsi خواجه شمسي
- Village
- Location within Iran
- Coordinates: 27°11′06″N 57°02′50″E
- Country: Iran
- Province: Hormozgan
- County: Minab
- Bakhsh: Central
- Rural District: Howmeh

Population (2006)
  - Total: 144
- Time zone: UTC+3:30 (IRST)
  - Summer (DST): UTC+4:30 (IRDT)

Khvajeh Shamsi (Persian: خواجه شمسي, also Romanized as Khvājeh Shamsī) is a village in Howmeh Rural District, in the Central District of Minab County, Hormozgan Province, Iran. At the 2006 census, its population was 144, in 39 families.
