= Damaghrig =

Damaghrig دماغ ريگ
- Village
- Location within Iran
- Coordinates: 26°57′44″N 57°03′01″E
- Country: Iran
- Province: Hormozgan
- County: Minab
- Bakhsh: Central
- Rural District: Band-e Zarak

Population (2006)
  - Total: 376
- Time zone: UTC+3:30 (IRST)
  - Summer (DST): UTC+4:30 (IRDT)

Damaghrig (Persian: دماغ ريگ, also Romanized as Damāghrīg) is a village in Band-e Zarak Rural District, in the Central District of Minab County, Hormozgan Province, Iran. At the 2006 census, its population was 376, in 59 families.
