= Kurgan (disambiguation) =

A kurgan is a tumulus or burial mound in Eurasia.

Kurgan may also refer to:

== Places in Russia ==
- Kurgan, Kurgan Oblast, a city
  - Kurgan Airport
  - Kurgan West, a former nearby airbase
- Kurgan Oblast, a federal subject of Russia
- Kurgan, Amur Oblast, rural locality
- Kurgan, Blagoveshchensky District, Altai Krai, rural locality
- Kurgan, Cherepovetsky District, Vologda Oblast, rural locality
- Kurgan, Perm Krai, rural locality

== People ==
- Avni Kurgan (born 1912), Turkish footballer
- Laura Kurgan, South African architect
- Lukasz Kurgan (born 1975), Polish bioinformatician

== Other uses ==
- The Kurgan hypothesis, a proposed origin for the Proto-Indo-European language and culture
- The Kurgan, the main antagonist of the film Highlander
- The Kurgan, a fictional human culture in Warhammer Fantasy (setting), aligned to the Chaos faction
- Kurgan cattle, a breed of cattle that originated from Russia

== See also ==
- Kurrgan, ring name of Robert Maillet (born 1969), Canadian actor and retired wrestler
- Kargan (disambiguation)
- Korgan, a town and district in Turkey
