= Gurzang =

Gurzang گورزانگ
- Village
- Location within Iran
- Coordinates: 27°05′46″N 57°01′33″E
- Country: Iran
- Province: Hormozgan
- County: Minab
- Bakhsh: Central
- Rural District: Band-e Zarak

Population (2006)
  - Total: 3,089
- Time zone: UTC+3:30 (IRST)
  - Summer (DST): UTC+4:30 (IRDT)

Gvarzang (Persian: گورزانگ, also Romanized as gurzang, goorzang, Gūrzāng and Gūrzang) is a village in Band-e Zarak Rural District, in the Central District of Minab County, Hormozgan province, Iran. At the 2006 census, its population was 3,089, in 684 families.
