= Mazegh-e Bala =

Mazegh-e Bala مازغ بالا
- Village
- Location within Iran
- Coordinates: 27°06′05″N 56°55′17″E
- Country: Iran
- Province: Hormozgan
- County: Minab
- Bakhsh: Central
- Rural District: Tiab

Population (2006)
  - Total: 1,253
- Time zone: UTC+3:30 (IRST)
  - Summer (DST): UTC+4:30 (IRDT)

Mazegh-e Bala (Persian: مازغ بالا, also Romanized as Māzegh-e Bālā and Māzegh Bālā; also known as Mazagh, Māzigh, and Mazīq) is a village in Tiab Rural District, in the Central District of Minab County, Hormozgan Province, Iran. At the 2006 census, its population was 1,253, in 245 families.
