= Kariyan, Hormozgan =

Village in Hormozgan province, Iran

Kariyan Persian: كريان
- Village
- Location within Iran
- Coordinates: 26°57′20″N 57°13′05″E
- Country: Iran
- Province: Hormozgan
- County: Minab
- District: Kariyan
- Rural District: Kariyan

Population (2016)
  - Total: 5,000
- Time zone: UTC+3:30 (IRST)

Kariyan (Persian: كريان) (Note: Also romanized as Kareyān, Karian, Karīān, and Karīyan; also known as Kariūn) is a village in, and the former capital of, Kariyan Rural District of Kariyan District, Minab County, Hormozgan province, Iran, serving as capital of the district. The capital of the rural district has been transferred to the village of Ravang.

== Demographics ==
=== Population ===
At the time of the 2006 National Census, the village's population wa 4,340 in 818 households, when it was in the Central District. The following census in 2011 counted 4,306 people in 1,113 households. The 2016 census measured the population of the village as 5,000 people in 1,369 households. It was the most populous village in its rural district.

After the census, the rural district was separated from the district in the establishment of Kariyan District.

== Background ==
Both famous poets and great poets come from the village of Kariyan . In the distant past, residents of nearby towns and villages used to travel to Kariyan for agriculture and a means of subsistence. Kariyan is one of the largest villages in Minab county. A unique and widespread language is used in the Kariyan elegy. Geographical location: the Kariyan dam, orchards, and agricultural farms are among the village's attractions. It is situated 20 kilometers southeast of Minab County. Watermelon, tomato, onion, eggplant, green pepper, cabbage, mulberry, tobacco, and snuff are among the agricultural products produced in this village. The village also has a large number of neighborhoods, including Khayari, Kalat, Hanai, Kolan, Shahguzan, Miromar, and Shabanee, among others.
