= Talang-e Anbari =

Talang-e Anbari تلنگ انباري
- Village
- Location within Iran
- Coordinates: 26°53′27″N 57°11′23″E
- Country: Iran
- Province: Hormozgan
- County: Minab
- Bakhsh: Central
- Rural District: Karian

Population (2006)
  - Total: 259
- Time zone: UTC+3:30 (IRST)
  - Summer (DST): UTC+4:30 (IRDT)

Talang-e Anbari (Persian: تلنگ انباري, also Romanized as Talang-e Ānbārī; also known as Talang and Tālang) is a village in Karian Rural District, in the Central District of Minab County, Hormozgan Province, Iran. At the 2006 census, its population was 259, in 52 families.
