= Cheraghabad-e Jonubi =

Cheraghabad-e Jonubi چراغ آباد جنوبي
- Village
- Location within Iran
- Coordinates: 27°11′05″N 57°27′52″E
- Country: Iran
- Province: Hormozgan
- County: Minab
- Bakhsh: Tukahur
- Rural District: Cheraghabad

Population (2006)
  - Total: 997
- Time zone: UTC+3:30 (IRST)
  - Summer (DST): UTC+4:30 (IRDT)

Cheraghabad-e Jonubi (Persian: چراغ آباد جنوبي, also Romanized as Cherāghābād-e Jonūbī) is a village in Cheraghabad Rural District, Tukahur District, Minab County, Hormozgan Province, Iran. At the 2006 census, its population was 997, in 207 families.
