= Kash Qalman =

Kash Qalman (Persian: كشقلمان) may refer to:

- Kash Qalman-e Bala
- Kash Qalman-e Pain
