= Kahtek, Minab =

Kahtek كهتك
- Village
- Location within Iran
- Coordinates: 26°57′21″N 57°09′12″E
- Country: Iran
- Province: Hormozgan
- County: Minab
- Bakhsh: Central
- Rural District: Karian

Population (2006)
  - Total: 236
- Time zone: UTC+3:30 (IRST)
  - Summer (DST): UTC+4:30 (IRDT)

Kahtek (Persian: كهتك, also Romanized as Kahtak) is a village in Karian Rural District, in the Central District of Minab County, Hormozgan Province, Iran. At the 2006 census, its population was 236, in 43 families.
