= Kash Qalman-e Pain =

Kash Qalman-e Pain كشقلمان پائين
- Village
- Location within Iran
- Coordinates: 27°01′42″N 56°59′35″E
- Country: Iran
- Province: Hormozgan
- County: Minab
- Bakhsh: Central
- Rural District: Band-e Zarak

Population (2006)
  - Total: 232
- Time zone: UTC+3:30 (IRST)
  - Summer (DST): UTC+4:30 (IRDT)

Kash Qalman-e Pain (Persian: كشقلمان پائين, also Romanized as Kash Qalmān-e Pā’īn) is a village in Band-e Zarak Rural District, in the Central District of Minab County, Hormozgan Province, Iran. At the 2006 census, its population was 232, in 40 families.
