= Tukahur =

Village in Hormozgan province, Iran

Tukahur Persian: توكهور
- Village
- Location within Iran
- Coordinates: 27°07′11″N 57°25′34″E
- Country: Iran
- Province: Hormozgan
- County: Minab
- District: Tukahur
- Rural District: Tukahur

Population (2016)
  - Total: 1,967
- Time zone: UTC+3:30 (IRST)

Tukahur (Persian: توكهور) (Note: Also romanized as Tūkahūr)) is a village in, and the capital of, Tukahur Rural District of Tukahur District, Minab County, Hormozgan province, Iran. The previous capital of the rural district was the village of Hasht Bandi, now a city.

== Demographics ==
=== Population ===
At the time of the 2006 National Census, the village's population was 1,852 in 355 households. The following census in 2011 counted 2,287 people in 530 households. The 2016 census measured the population of the village as 1,967 people in 545 households.
