= Cheraghabad-e Bala =

Cheraghabad-e Bala چراغ آباد بالا
- Village
- Location within Iran
- Coordinates: 27°12′35″N 57°28′07″E
- Country: Iran
- Province: Hormozgan
- County: Minab
- Bakhsh: Tukahur
- Rural District: Cheraghabad

Population (2006)
  - Total: 782
- Time zone: UTC+3:30 (IRST)
  - Summer (DST): UTC+4:30 (IRDT)

Cheraghabad-e Bala (Persian: چراغ آباد بالا, also Romanized as Cherāghābād-e Bālā) is a village in Cheraghabad Rural District, Tukahur District, Minab County, Hormozgan Province, Iran. At the 2006 census, its population was 782, in 162 families.
