= Hanai Sarrigan =

Hanai Sarrigan حنائي سرريگان
- Village
- Location within Iran
- Coordinates: 27°12′12″N 56°57′30″E
- Country: Iran
- Province: Hormozgan
- County: Minab
- Bakhsh: Central
- Rural District: Howmeh

Population (2006)
  - Total: 84
- Time zone: UTC+3:30 (IRST)
  - Summer (DST): UTC+4:30 (IRDT)

Hanai Sarrigan (Persian: حنائي سرريگان, also Romanized as Ḩanā’ī Sarrīgān; also known as Ḩanā’ī) is a village in Howmeh Rural District, in the Central District of Minab County, Hormozgan Province, Iran. At the 2006 census, its population was 84, in 17 families.
