= Kulegh Kashi =

Kulegh Kashi كولغ كاشي
- Village
- Location within Iran
- Coordinates: 27°04′10″N 56°57′44″E
- Country: Iran
- Province: Hormozgan
- County: Minab
- Bakhsh: Central
- Rural District: Band-e Zarak

Population (2006)
  - Total: 2,059
- Time zone: UTC+3:30 (IRST)
  - Summer (DST): UTC+4:30 (IRDT)

Kulegh Kashi (Persian: كولغ كاشي, also Romanized as Kūlegh Kāshī; also known as Kūlaq Kāshī and Kūleh Kāshī) is a village in Band-e Zarak Rural District, in the Central District of Minab County, Hormozgan Province, Iran. At the 2006 census, its population was 2,059, in 364 families.
