= Hakami, Iran =

Village in Hormozgan province, Iran

Hakami Persian: حكمي
- Village
- Location within Iran
- Coordinates: 27°10′32″N 57°01′17″E
- Country: Iran
- Province: Hormozgan
- County: Minab
- District: Central
- Rural District: Howmeh

Population (2016)
  - Total: 4,446
- Time zone: UTC+3:30 (IRST)

Hakami (Persian: حكمي) (Note: Also romanized as Hakamī) is a village in, and the capital of, Howmeh Rural District of the Central District of Minab County, Hormozgan province, Iran.

== Demographics ==
=== Population ===
At the time of the 2006 National Census, the village's population was 4,310 in 849 households. The following census in 2011 counted 4,649 people in 1,174 households. The 2016 census measured the population of the village as 4,446 people in 1,197 households. It was the most populous village in its rural district.
