= Borhan =

Borhan (Persian: برهان) may refer to:

- Borhan, Hormozgan
- Borhan, West Azerbaijan
