= Chah Gharbal =

Village in Hormozgan province, Iran

Chah Gharbal Persian: چاه غربال
- Village
- Location within Iran
- Coordinates: 27°07′00″N 57°20′31″E
- Country: Iran
- Province: Hormozgan
- County: Minab
- District: Tukahur
- Rural District: Tukahur

Population (2016)
  - Total: 2,282
- Time zone: UTC+3:30 (IRST)

Chah Gharbal (Persian: چاه غربال) (Note: Also romanized as Chāh Gharbāl) is a village in Tukahur Rural District of Tukahur District, Minab County, Hormozgan province, Iran.

== Demographics ==
=== Population ===
At the time of the 2006 National Census, the village's population was 1,625 in 355 households. The following census in 2011 counted 1,704 people in 427 households. The 2016 census measured the population of the village as 2,282 people in 631 households. It was the most populous village in its rural district.
