= Kulegh Kalam =

Kulegh Kalam كولغ كلم
- Village
- Location within Iran
- Coordinates: 27°01′13″N 57°04′04″E
- Country: Iran
- Province: Hormozgan
- County: Minab
- Bakhsh: Central
- Rural District: Band-e Zarak

Population (2006)
  - Total: 344
- Time zone: UTC+3:30 (IRST)
  - Summer (DST): UTC+4:30 (IRDT)

Kulegh Kalam (Persian: كولغ كلم, also Romanized as Kūlegh Kalam; also known as Kūlekhkalam) is a village in Band-e Zarak Rural District, in the Central District of Minab County, Hormozgan Province, Iran. At the 2006 census, its population was 344, in 51 families.
