= Rig Kag =

Rig Kag ريگ كگ
- Village
- Location within Iran
- Coordinates: 27°12′57″N 57°26′25″E
- Country: Iran
- Province: Hormozgan
- County: Minab
- Bakhsh: Tukahur
- Rural District: Cheraghabad

Population (2006)
  - Total: 300
- Time zone: UTC+3:30 (IRST)
  - Summer (DST): UTC+4:30 (IRDT)

Rig Kag (Persian: ريگ كگ, also Romanized as Rīg Kag; also known as Rīgak) is a village in Cheraghabad Rural District, Tukahur District, Minab County, Hormozgan Province, Iran. At the 2006 census, its population was 300, in 60 families.
