= Now Band =

Now Band or Noband (Persian: نوبند) may refer to:

- Now Band-e Jadid
- Now Band-e Qadim
