= Kulegh =

Kulegh (Persian: كولغ) may refer to:

- Kulegh Kashi
- Kulegh Kalam
