= Borhan, Hormozgan =

Borhan برهان
- Village
- Location within Iran
- Coordinates: 26°59′21″N 57°11′21″E
- Country: Iran
- Province: Hormozgan
- County: Minab
- Bakhsh: Central
- Rural District: Karian

Population (2006)
  - Total: 110
- Time zone: UTC+3:30 (IRST)
  - Summer (DST): UTC+4:30 (IRDT)

Borhan (Persian: برهان, also Romanized as Borhān) is a village in Karian Rural District, in the Central District of Minab County, Hormozgan Province, Iran. At the 2006 census, its population was 110, in 24 families.
