= Mazegh-e Pain =

Mazegh-e Pain مازغ پايين
- Village
- Location within Iran
- Coordinates: 27°05′35″N 56°54′06″E
- Country: Iran
- Province: Hormozgan
- County: Minab
- Bakhsh: Central
- Rural District: Tiab

Population (2006)
  - Total: 1,023
- Time zone: UTC+3:30 (IRST)
  - Summer (DST): UTC+4:30 (IRDT)

Mazegh-e Pain (Persian: مازغ پايين, also Romanized as Māzegh-e Pā’īn and Māzegh Pā’īn; also known as Māzegh) is a village in Tiab Rural District, in the Central District of Minab County, Hormozgan Province, Iran.

== Census ==
At the 2006 census, its population was 1,023, in 197 families.
