= Zehuki, Minab =

City in Hormozgan province, Iran

Zehuki Persian: زهوكي
- City
- Location within Iran
- Coordinates: 27°04′41″N 57°03′51″E
- Country: Iran
- Province: Hormozgan
- County: Minab
- District: Band-e Zarak

Population (2016)
  - Total: 4,451
- Time zone: UTC+3:30 (IRST)

Zehuki (Persian: زهوكي) (Note: Also romanized as Zehūkī) is a city in Band-e Zarak District of Minab County, Hormozgan province, Iran.

== Demographics ==
=== Population ===
At the time of the 2006 National Census, Zehuki's population was 3,349 in 664 households, when it was a village in Band-e Zarak Rural District of the Central District. The following census in 2011 counted 3,274 people in 809 households, by which time the rural district had been separated from the district in the formation of Band-e Zarak District. The 2016 census measured the population as 4,451 people in 1,136 households.

Zehuki was elevated to the status of a city after the census.
