= Sarbaran Rural District =

Rural district in Hormozgan province, Iran

Sarbaran Rural District Persian: دهستان سرباران
- Rural District
- Location within Iran
- Coordinates: 27°10′32″N 56°57′32″E
- Country: Iran
- Province: Hormozgan
- County: Minab
- District: Tiyab
- Capital: Sarbaran
- Time zone: UTC+3:30 (IRST)

Sarbaran Rural District (Persian: دهستان سرباران) is in Tiyab District of Minab County, Hormozgan province, Iran. Its capital is the village of Sarbaran, whose population at the time of the 2016 National Census was 620 in 164 households.

== History ==
After the 2016 census, Tiyab Rural District was separated from the Central District in the formation of Tiyab District, and Sarbaran Rural District was created in the new district.
