= Kash Qalman-e Bala =

Kash Qalman-e Bala كشقلمان بالا
- Village
- Location within Iran
- Coordinates: 27°02′14″N 56°59′48″E
- Country: Iran
- Province: Hormozgan
- County: Minab
- Bakhsh: Central
- Rural District: Band-e Zarak

Population (2006)
  - Total: 460
- Time zone: UTC+3:30 (IRST)
  - Summer (DST): UTC+4:30 (IRDT)

Kash Qalman-e Bala (Persian: كشقلمان بالا, also Romanized as Kash Qalmān-e Bālā) is a village in Band-e Zarak Rural District, in the Central District of Minab County, Hormozgan Province, Iran. At the 2006 census, its population was 460, in 83 families.
