= Kahtek =

Kahtek or Kahtak (Persian: كهتك) may refer to:

- Kahtek, Bandar Abbas
- Kahtek, Minab
