= Ravang, Hormozgan =

Village in Hormozgan province, Iran

Ravang Persian: راونگ
- Village

- Location within Iran
- Coordinates: 27°03′51″N 57°11′51″E
- Country: Iran
- Province: Hormozgan
- County: Minab
- District: Kariyan
- Rural District: Kariyan

Population (2016)
  - Total: 2,800
- Time zone: UTC+3:30 (IRST)

Ravang (Persian: راونگ) (Note: Also romanized as Rāvang and Ravanag; also known as Rābin and Rāving) is a village in, and the capital of, Kariyan Rural District of Kariyan District, Minab County, Hormozgan province, Iran. The previous capital of the rural district was the village of Kariyan.

== Demographics ==
=== Population ===
At the time of the 2006 National Census, the village's population was 2,445 in 488 households, when it was in the Central District. The following census in 2011 counted 2,800 people in 663 households. The 2016 census measured the population of the village as 2,800 people in 753 households.

After the census, the rural district was separated from the district in the establishment of Kariyan District.
