= Kargan =

Kargan may refer to:

Villages in Iran

- Kargan, Ardabil
- Kargan-e Qadim, East Azerbaijan, also known as Kargān
- Kargan, Hormozgan
- Kargan Rural District, an administrative division of Minab County, Hormozgan province
- Kargan, Kermanshah

Other

- Kargan (lake), a body of water in Novosibirsk Oblast, Russia

== See also ==
- Karkan, Gilan
