= Now Band-e Qadim =

Now Band-e Qadim نوبندقديم
- Village
- Location within Iran
- Coordinates: 27°15′46″N 57°00′31″E
- Country: Iran
- Province: Hormozgan
- County: Minab
- Bakhsh: Central
- Rural District: Gurband

Population (2006)
  - Total: 231
- Time zone: UTC+3:30 (IRST)
  - Summer (DST): UTC+4:30 (IRDT)

Now Band-e Qadim (Persian: نوبندقديم, also Romanized as Now Band-e Qadīm; also known as Noband and Now Band) is a village in Gurband Rural District, in the Central District of Minab County, Hormozgan Province, Iran. At the 2006 census, its population was 231, in 52 families.
