= Cheraghabad, Hormozgan =

Cheraghabad چراغ اباد
- Village
- Location within Iran
- Coordinates: 27°12′26″N 57°26′13″E
- Country: Iran
- Province: Hormozgan
- County: Minab
- Bakhsh: Tukahur
- Rural District: Cheraghabad

Population (2006)
  - Total: 559
- Time zone: UTC+3:30 (IRST)
  - Summer (DST): UTC+4:30 (IRDT)

Cheraghabad (Persian: چراغ اباد, also Romanized as Cherāghābād) is a village in Cheraghabad Rural District, Tukahur District, Minab County, Hormozgan Province, Iran. At the 2006 census, its population was 559, in 120 families.
