= Mojtame-ye Emam =

Village in Hormozgan province, Iran

Mojtame-ye Emam Persian: مجتمع امام
- Village
- Location within Iran
- Coordinates: 27°06′23″N 57°27′57″E
- Country: Iran
- Province: Hormozgan
- County: Minab
- District: Tukahur
- Rural District: Cheraghabad

Population (2016)
  - Total: 2,335
- Time zone: UTC+3:30 (IRST)

Mojtame-ye Emam (Persian: مجتمع امام) (Note: Also romanized as Mojtame`-ye Emām) is a village in Cheraghabad Rural District of Tukahur District, Minab County, Hormozgan province, Iran.

== Demographics ==
=== Population ===
At the time of the 2006 National Census, the village's population was 2,260 in 480 households. The following census in 2011 counted 2,394 people in 565 households. The 2016 census measured the population of the village as 2,335 people in 594 households. It was the most populous village in its rural district.
