= Hezareh Castle =

Castle in Hormozgan Province, Iran

Hezareh castle
- قلعه هزاره
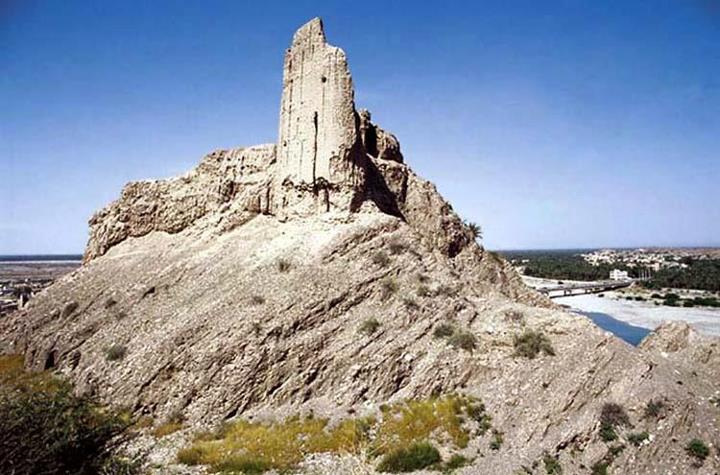
- Interactive map of the Hezareh castle area

General information
- Type: Castle
- Location: Minab County, Iran
- Coordinates: 27°09′09″N 57°04′41″E

Hezareh castle (Persian: قلعه هزاره) is a historical castle located in Minab County in Hormozgan Province,] The Hezareh Castle is located in the city of Mināb (Hormozgān region) and dates back to the first millennium AD The historic building of the Hezāreh Castle or Bibi Minu (local inhabitants are convinced that in the past two sisters named Bibi Minu and Bibi Nāzanin built this city and lived in this castle), in raw bricks and mud, had a defensive and military function.

This place from the Achaemenid period and was used for governmental purposes and this function lasted until the Safavid period.
