= Raving =

Raving may refer to:

- Rave, a party
- Raving, Iran, a village in Hormozgan Province, Iran
- Official Monster Raving Loony Party, a single-issue, parodical political party in the United Kingdom
- Raving (film), a film
- Rayman Raving Rabbids, a Wii video game
