= Gurband, Hormozgan =

Village in Hormozgan province, Iran

Gurband Persian: گوربند
- Village
- Location within Iran
- Coordinates: 27°19′33″N 56°58′48″E
- Country: Iran
- Province: Hormozgan
- County: Minab
- District: Central
- Rural District: Gurband

Population (2016)
  - Total: 2,692
- Time zone: UTC+3:30 (IRST)

Gurband (Persian: گوربند) (Note: Also romanized as Gavārband and Gūrband; also known as Gavarbaad and Qal‘eh-ye Gūrband) is a village in, and the capital of, Gurband Rural District of the Central District of Minab County, Hormozgan province, Iran.

== Demographics ==
=== Population ===
At the time of the 2006 National Census, the village's population was 2,444 in 615 households. The following census in 2011 counted 2,562 people in 651 households. The 2016 census measured the population of the village as 2,692 people in 813 households.
