= Tiyab, Minab =

Village in Hormozgan province, Iran

Tiyab Persian: تياب
- Village
- Location within Iran
- Coordinates: 27°06′41″N 56°52′05″E
- Country: Iran
- Province: Hormozgan
- County: Minab
- District: Tiyab
- Rural District: Tiyab

Population (2016)
  - Total: 827
- Time zone: UTC+3:30 (IRST)

Tiyab (Persian: تياب) (Note: Also romanized as Teyāb, Tiab, Tīāb, and Tīyab) is a village in, and the former capital of, Tiyab Rural District of Tiyab District, Minab County, Hormozgan Province, Iran, serving as the capital of the district. The capital of the rural district has been transferred to the village of Nakhl-e Ebrahimi.

== Demographics ==
=== Population ===
At the time of the 2006 National Census, the village's population was 991 in 209 households, when it was in the Central District. The following census in 2011 counted 993 people in 258 households. The 2016 census measured the population of the village as 827 people in 265 households. It was the most populous village in its rural district.

After the census, the rural district was separated from the district in the formation of Tiyab District.
