= Band-e Zarak =

City in Hormozgan province, Iran

Band-e Zarak Persian: بندزرك
- City
- Location within Iran
- Coordinates: 27°04′04″N 56°58′45″E
- Country: Iran
- Province: Hormozgan
- County: Minab
- District: Band-e Zarak

Population (2016)
  - Total: 4,796
- Time zone: UTC+3:30 (IRST)

Band-e Zarak (Persian: بندزرك) (Note: Also known as Bandark-e Kohneh, Banz̄ark, Banz̄ark Kohneh, Banz̄ark-e Kohneh, and Banz̄ark Now) is a city in, and the capital of, Band-e Zarak District of Minab County, Hormozgan province, Iran. It also serves as the administrative center for Band-e Zarak Rural District.

== Demographics ==
=== Population ===
At the time of the 2006 National Census, Band-e Zarak's population was 4,386 in 776 households, when it was a village in Band-e Zarak Rural District of the Central District. The following census in 2011 counted 4,683 people in 1,026 households, by which time the rural district had been separated from the district in the formation of Band-e Zarak District. The 2016 census measured the population as 4,796 people in 1,279 households. It was the most populous village in its rural district.

Band-e Zarak was elevated to the status of a city after the census.
