= Kargan Rural District =

Rural district in Hormozgan province, Iran

Kargan Rural District Persian: دهستان کرگان
- Rural District
- Location within Iran
- Coordinates: 26°57′58″N 57°01′53″E
- Country: Iran
- Province: Hormozgan
- County: Minab
- District: Band-e Zarak
- Capital: Sarmast

Population (2016)
  - Total: 13,724
- Time zone: UTC+3:30 (IRST)

Kargan Rural District (Persian: دهستان کرگان) is in Band-e Zarak District of Minab County, Hormozgan province, Iran. Its capital is the village of Sarmast. The previous capital of the rural district was the village of Kargan, now a city.

== History ==
After the 2006 National Census, Band-e Zarak Rural District was separated from the Central District in the formation of Band-e Zarak District, and Kargan Rural District was created in the new district.

== Demographics ==
=== Population ===
At the time of the census of 2011, the rural district's population was 12,381 in 2,749 households. The 2016 census measured the population of the rural district as 13,724 in 3,505 households. The most populous of its 16 villages was Kargan (now a city).
