= Khademi =

Khademi may refer to:

== Surname ==
- Ali-Mohammad Khademi (1913–1978), general manager of Iran Air from 1962 until 1978, assassinated during the Islamic Revolution in Iran
- Hedayatollah Khademi (born 1958), Iranian politician and executive manager
- Kaisy Khademi (born 1994), Afghanistan-born British professional boxer
- Kubra Khademi (born 1989), Afghan performance artist, refugeed and now based in Paris, France
- Majid Khademi (died 2026), Iranian brigadier general of the Islamic Revolutionary Guard Corps

== Other ==
- Hajji Khademi, a village in Gurband Rural District of the Central District of Minab County, Hormozgan province, Iran
- Khademi Fajrabad, a village in Zavarom Rural District of the Central District in Shirvan County, North Khorasan province, Iran
