= Talang Rural District (Minab County) =

Rural district in Hormozgan province, Iran

Talang Rural District Persian: دهستان تلنگ
- Rural District
- Location within Iran
- Coordinates: 26°53′39″N 57°12′35″E
- Country: Iran
- Province: Hormozgan
- County: Minab
- District: Kariyan
- Capital: Talang-e Saratak
- Time zone: UTC+3:30 (IRST)

Talang Rural District (Persian: دهستان تلنگ) is in Kariyan District of Minab County, Hormozgan province, Iran. Its capital is the village of Talang-e Saratak, whose population at the time of the 2016 National Census was 732 in 191 households.

== History ==
After the 2016 census, Kariyan Rural District was separated from the Central District in the formation of Kariyan District, and Talang Rural District was created in the new district.
