= Tumulus (disambiguation) =

A tumulus is a mound of earth and stones raised over a grave or graves.

Tumulus may also refer to:

- Tumulus (biology), a mound of earth surrounding the entrance of ground-nesting bees and wasps
- Tumulus culture, culture that dominated Central Europe during the Middle Bronze Age (ca.1600 BC to 1200 BC)
- Tumulus (band), a progressive folk metal band from Yaroslavl Russia
- Pressure ridge (lava), in volcanology, sometimes referred to as a tumulus

== See also ==
- Kurgan (disambiguation)
