= Hanai =

Hanai (written: 花井 lit "flower well") is a Japanese surname. Notable people with the surname include:

- Ranko Hanai (花井 蘭子; 1918–1961), Japanese actress
- Rumi Hanai (花井 瑠美; born 1987), Japanese actress, model and former rhythmic gymnast
- Sho Hanai (花井 聖; born 1989), Japanese footballer

== Fictional characters ==
- Haruki Hanai (花井 春樹), a character in the manga series School Rumble

== See also ==
- Hānai, the Hawaiian cultural practice of informal adoption
- Hanai Sarrigan, a village in Hormozgan Province, Iran
- Saeed Hanaei
