= Now Band-e Jadid =

Nowband-e Jadid نوبند جديد
- Village
- Location within Iran
- Coordinates: 27°15′27″N 57°02′09″E
- Country: Iran
- Province: Hormozgan
- County: Minab
- Bakhsh: Central
- Rural District: Gwarband

Population (2006)
  - Total: 1,436
- Time zone: UTC+3:30 (IRST)
  - Summer (DST): UTC+4:30 (IRDT)

Nowband-e Jadid (Persian: نوبند جديد, also Romanized as Nowband-e Jadīd) is a village in Gwarband Rural District, in the Central District of Minab County, Hormozgan Province, Iran. At the 2006 census, its population was 1,436, in 326 families.
