= Kargan, Hormozgan =

City in Hormozgan province, Iran

Kargan Persian: كرگان
- City
- Location within Iran
- Coordinates: 26°57′14″N 56°57′10″E
- Country: Iran
- Province: Hormozgan
- County: Minab
- District: Band-e Zarak

Population (2016)
  - Total: 5,282
- Time zone: UTC+3:30 (IRST)

Kargan (Persian: كرگان) (Note: Also romanized as Kargān) is a city in Band-e Zarak District of Minab County, Hormozgan province, Iran. As a village, it was the capital of Kargan Rural District until its capital was transferred to the village of Sarmast.

== Demographics ==
=== Population ===
At the time of the 2006 National Census, Kargan's population was 4,380 in 789 households, when it was a village in Band-e Zarak Rural District of the Central District. The following census in 2011 counted 4,848 people in 1,138 households, by which time the rural district had been separated from the district in the formation of Band-e Zarak District. Kargan was transferred to Kargan Rural District created in the new district. The 2016 census measured the population as 5,282 people in 1,393 households. It was the most populous village in its rural district.

Kargan was elevated to the status of a city after the census.
