= Tirur, Iran =

City in Hormozgan province, Iran

Tirur Persian: تيرور
- City
- Location within Iran
- Coordinates: 27°20′21″N 56°57′20″E
- Country: Iran
- Province: Hormozgan
- County: Minab
- District: Central

Population (2016)
  - Total: 4,871
- Time zone: UTC+3:30 (IRST)

Tirur (Persian: تيرور) (Note: Also romanized as Tīrūr) is a city in the Central District of Minab County, Hormozgan province, Iran.

== Demographics ==
=== Population ===
At the time of the 2006 National Census, Tirur's population was 4,037 in 873 households, when it was a village in Gurband Rural District. The following census in 2011 counted 4,362 people in 1,098 households. The 2016 census measured the population as 4,871 people in 1,365 households, by which time Tirur had been elevated to the status of a city.
