= Hajji Khademi =

Village in Hormozgan province, Iran

Hajji Khademi Persian: حاجي خادمي
- Village
- Location within Iran
- Coordinates: 27°13′53″N 57°02′40″E
- Country: Iran
- Province: Hormozgan
- County: Minab
- District: Central
- Rural District: Gurband

Population (2016)
  - Total: 2,955
- Time zone: UTC+3:30 (IRST)

Hajji Khademi (Persian: حاجي خادمي) (Note: Also romanized as Ḩājī Khādemī and Ḩājjī Khādemī; also known as Ḩājjī Khādem) is a village in Gurband Rural District of the Central District of Minab County, Hormozgan province, Iran.

== Demographics ==
=== Population ===
At the time of the 2006 National Census, the village's population was 2,545 in 509 households. The following census in 2011 counted 2,794 people in 613 households. The 2016 census measured the population of the village as 2,955 people in 853 households. It was the most populous village in its rural district.
