= Hasht Bandi =

City in Hormozgan province, Iran

Hasht Bandi Persian: هشت بندی
- City
- Location within Iran
- Coordinates: 27°09′57″N 57°27′29″E
- Country: Iran
- Province: Hormozgan
- County: Minab
- District: Tukahur

Population (2016)
  - Total: 6,718
- Time zone: UTC+3:30 (IRST)

Hasht Bandi (Persian: هشت بندي يك or هشت بندی) (Note: Also romanized as Hasht Bandī; formerly Hasht Bandi-ye Yek) is a city in, and the capital of, Tukahur District of Minab County, Hormozgan province, Iran. It also serves as the administrative center for Cheraghabad Rural District. As a village, it was the capital of Tukahur Rural District until its capital was transferred to the village of Tukahur.

== Demographics ==
=== Population ===
At the time of the 2006 National Census, Hasht Bandi's population was 3,009 in 631 households, when it was the village of Hasht Bandi-ye Yek in Cheraghabad Rural District. The following census in 2011 counted 4,438 people in 1,026 households, by which time the village had been elevated to city status as Hasht Bandi. The 2016 census measured the population of the city as 6,718 people in 1,710 households.
