= Mazagh-e Kurian =

Mazagh-e Kurian مازغ كوريان
- Village
- Country: Iran
- Province: Hormozgan
- County: Minab
- Bakhsh: Senderk
- Rural District: Senderk

Population (2006)
  - Total: 208
- Time zone: UTC+3:30 (IRST)
  - Summer (DST): UTC+4:30 (IRDT)

Mazagh-e Kurian (Persian: مازغ كوريان, also Romanized as Māzagh-e Kūrīān) is a village in Senderk Rural District, Senderk District, Minab County, Hormozgan Province, Iran. At the 2006 census, its population was 208, in 44 families.
