= Gur Band, Sistan and Baluchestan =

Gur Band گوربند
- Village
- Location within Iran
- Coordinates: 27°33′21″N 61°07′55″E
- Country: Iran
- Province: Sistan and Baluchestan
- County: Khash
- Bakhsh: Irandegan
- Rural District: Kahnuk

Population (2006)
  - Total: 95
- Time zone: UTC+3:30 (IRST)
  - Summer (DST): UTC+4:30 (IRDT)

Gur Band (Persian: گوربند, also Romanized as Gūr Band) is a village in Kahnuk Rural District, Irandegan District, Khash County, Sistan and Baluchestan Province, Iran. At the 2006 census, its population was 95, in 22 families.
