= Rigak, Kerman =

Rigak ريگك
- Village
- Location within Iran
- Coordinates: 27°46′10″N 58°41′09″E
- Country: Iran
- Province: Kerman
- County: Rudbar-e Jonubi
- Bakhsh: Jazmurian
- Rural District: Jazmurian

Population (2006)
  - Total: 491
- Time zone: UTC+3:30 (IRST)
  - Summer (DST): UTC+4:30 (IRDT)

Rigak (Persian: ريگك, also Romanized as Rīgak) is a village in Jazmurian Rural District, Jazmurian District, Rudbar-e Jonubi County, Kerman Province, Iran. At the 2006 census, its population was 491, in 103 families.
