= Charaghabad-e Pirdusti =

Village in Lorestan province, Iran

Charaghabad-e Pirdusti Persian: چراغ آباد پيردوستي
- Village
- Country: Iran
- Province: Lorestan
- County: Delfan
- District: Itivand
- Rural District: Itivand-e Shomali

Population (2016)
  - Total: 60
- Time zone: UTC+3:30 (IRST)

Charaghabad Pirdusti (Persian: چراغ آباد پيردوستي) (Note: Also romanized as Charaghabad Pir Dusti, Charāghābād Pīr Dūstī, and Charāghābād Pīrdūstī) is a village in Itivand-e Shomali Rural District of Itivand District in Delfan County, Lorestan province, Iran.

== Demographics ==
=== Population ===
At the time of the 2006 National Census, the village's population was 63 in 15 households, when it was in Kakavand District. The following census in 2011 counted 70 people in 21 households. The 2016 census measured the population of the village as 60 people in 19 households.

In 2022, the rural district was separated from the district in the formation of Itivand District.
