= Tiab, Fars =

Tiab تي اب
- Village
- Location within Iran
- Coordinates: 28°40′05″N 55°06′18″E
- Country: Iran
- Province: Fars
- County: Darab
- Bakhsh: Rostaq
- Rural District: Kuhestan

Population (2006)
  - Total: 17
- Time zone: UTC+3:30 (IRST)
  - Summer (DST): UTC+4:30 (IRDT)

Tiab (Persian: تي اب, also Romanized as Tīāb) is a village in Kuhestan Rural District, Rostaq District, Darab County, Fars province, Iran. At the 2006 census, its population was 17, in 5 families.
