= Kurgan, Cherepovetsky District, Vologda Oblast =

Kurgan Курган
- Village
- Location within Vologda Oblast Location within Russia
- Coordinates: 58°43′N 38°31′E
- Country: Russia
- Region: Vologda Oblast
- District: Cherepovetsky District
- Time zone: UTC+3:00

Kurgan (Russian: Курган) is a rural locality (a village) in Myaksinskoye Rural Settlement, Cherepovetsky District, Vologda Oblast, Russia. The population was 3 as of 2002.

== Geography ==
Kurgan is located 63 km (39 mi) southeast of Cherepovets (the district's administrative centre) by road. Kornigovka is the nearest rural locality.
