= Kalatak, Kerman =

Kalatak كلاتك
- Village
- Location within Iran
- Coordinates: 27°49′36″N 57°58′23″E
- Country: Iran
- Province: Kerman
- County: Qaleh Ganj
- Bakhsh: Central
- Rural District: Sorkh Qaleh

Population (2006)
  - Total: 32
- Time zone: UTC+3:30 (IRST)
  - Summer (DST): UTC+4:30 (IRDT)

Kalatak (Persian: كلاتك, also romanized as Kalātak) is a village in Sorkh Qaleh Rural District, in the Central District of Qaleh Ganj County, Kerman Province, Iran. At the 2006 census, its population was 32, in 5 families.
