= Tiab, Hajjiabad =

Tiab تياب
- Village
- Location within Iran
- Coordinates: 27°38′15″N 57°05′18″E
- Country: Iran
- Province: Hormozgan
- County: Hajjiabad
- Bakhsh: Ahmadi
- Rural District: Kuh Shah

Population (2006)
  - Total: 275
- Time zone: UTC+3:30 (IRST)
  - Summer (DST): UTC+4:30 (IRDT)

Tiab (Persian: تياب, also Romanized as Tīāb) is a village in Kuh Shah Rural District, Ahmadi District, Hajjiabad County, Hormozgan Province, Iran. At the 2006 census, its population was 275, in 71 families.
