= Kurgan, Blagoveshchensky District, Altai Krai =

Kurgan Курган
- Settlement
- Location within Altai Krai Location within Russia
- Coordinates: 53°05′N 80°17′E
- Country: Russia
- Region: Altai Krai
- District: Blagoveshchensky District
- Time zone: UTC+7:00

Kurgan (Russian: Курган) is a rural locality (a settlement) in Novokulundinsky Selsoviet, Blagoveshchensky District, Altai Krai, Russia. The population was 90 as of 2013. It was founded in 1912. There are two streets.

== Geography ==
Kurgan is located 53 km northeast of Blagoveshchenka (the district's administrative centre) by road. Novotyumentsevo is the nearest rural locality.
