= Cheraghabad-e Shokrabad =

Cheraghabad-e Shokrabad, Iran چراغ آباد شكر آباد
- Village
- Location within Iran
- Coordinates: 35°29′58″N 47°46′36″E
- Country: Iran
- Province: Kurdistan
- County: Qorveh
- Bakhsh: Serishabad
- Rural District: Lak

Population (2006)
  - Total: 169
- Time zone: UTC+3:30 (IRST)
  - Summer (DST): UTC+4:30 (IRDT)

Cheraghabad-e Shokrabad (Persian: چراغ آباد شكر آباد, also Romanized as Cherāghābād-e Shokrābād; also known as Cherāghābād, Shokrābād, Shokr Abad Abdol Abad, and Shrākāwa) is a village in Lak Rural District, Serishabad District, Qorveh County, Kurdistan Province, Iran. At the 2006 census, its population was 169, in 37 families. The village is populated by Kurds.
