= Daharan =

Daharan دهاران
- Village
- Location within Iran
- Coordinates: 27°47′16″N 57°41′53″E
- Country: Iran
- Province: Kerman
- County: Manujan
- Bakhsh: Aseminun
- Rural District: Deh Kahan

Population (2006)
  - Total: 30
- Time zone: UTC+3:30 (IRST)
  - Summer (DST): UTC+4:30 (IRDT)

Daharan (Persian: دهاران, also Romanized as Dahārān; also known a Cherāghābād and Dahārūn) is a village in Deh Kahan Rural District, Aseminun District, Manujan County, Kerman Province, Iran. At the 2006 census, its population was 30, in 5 families.
