= Cheraghabad, Kerman =

Cheraghabad چراغ اباد
- Village
- Location within Iran
- Coordinates: 27°29′43″N 57°53′53″E
- Country: Iran
- Province: Kerman
- County: Qaleh Ganj
- Bakhsh: Central
- Rural District: Qaleh Ganj

Population (2006)
  - Total: 465
- Time zone: UTC+3:30 (IRST)
  - Summer (DST): UTC+4:30 (IRDT)

Cheraghabad (Persian: چراغ اباد, also Romanized as Cherāghābād) is a village in Qaleh Ganj Rural District, in the Central District of Qaleh Ganj County, Kerman Province, Iran. At the 2006 census, its population was 465, in 97 families.
