= Chah Lak =

Chah Lak چاه لك
- Village
- Location within Iran
- Coordinates: 27°24′18″N 57°56′02″E
- Country: Iran
- Province: Kerman
- County: Qaleh Ganj
- Bakhsh: Central
- Rural District: Qaleh Ganj

Population (2006)
  - Total: 213
- Time zone: UTC+3:30 (IRST)
  - Summer (DST): UTC+4:30 (IRDT)

Chah Lak (Persian: چاه لك, also Romanized as Chāh Lak; also known as Chāh Lākī, Chāh Log, Chāh Logh, and Cherāghābād-e Chāh Log) is a village in Qaleh Ganj Rural District, in the Central District of Qaleh Ganj County, Kerman Province, Iran. At the 2006 census, its population was 213, in 43 families.
