= Cheraghabad-e Olya =

Cheraghabad-e Olya چراغ ابادعليا
- Village
- Location within Iran
- Coordinates: 33°52′38″N 48°13′36″E
- Country: Iran
- Province: Lorestan
- County: Selseleh
- Bakhsh: Central
- Rural District: Yusefvand

Population (2006)
  - Total: 179
- Time zone: UTC+3:30 (IRST)
  - Summer (DST): UTC+4:30 (IRDT)

Cheraghabad-e Olya (Persian: چراغ ابادعليا, also Romanized as Cherāghābād-e 'Olyā) is a village in Yusefvand Rural District, in the Central District of Selseleh County, Lorestan province, Iran. At the 2006 census, its population was 179, in 33 families.
