= Kurgan, Amur Oblast =

Kurgan Курган
- Selo
- Location within Amur Oblast Location within Russia
- Coordinates: 51°44′N 128°06′E
- Country: Russia
- Region: Amur Oblast
- District: Svobodnensky District
- Time zone: UTC+9:00

Kurgan (Russian: Курган) is a rural locality (a selo) in Kurgansky Selsoviet of Svobodnensky District, Amur Oblast, Russia. The population was 54 as of 2018. There are 8 streets.

== Geography ==
Kurgan is located on the left bank of the Bolshaya Pera River, 51 km north of Svobodny (the district's administrative centre) by road. Ledyanaya is the nearest rural locality.
