= Kahtek, Bandar Abbas =

Kahtek كهتك
- Village
- Location within Iran
- Coordinates: 27°43′31″N 55°49′20″E
- Country: Iran
- Province: Hormozgan
- County: Bandar Abbas
- Bakhsh: Fin
- Rural District: Fin

Population (2006)
  - Total: 28
- Time zone: UTC+3:30 (IRST)
  - Summer (DST): UTC+4:30 (IRDT)

Kahtek (Persian: كهتك, also Romanized as Khatak) is a village in Fin Rural District, Fin District, Bandar Abbas County, Hormozgan Province, Iran. At the 2006 census, its population was 28, in 8 families.
