= Kalatak, Bandar Abbas =

Kalatak كلاتك
- Village
- Location within Iran
- Coordinates: 27°43′27″N 56°19′43″E
- Country: Iran
- Province: Hormozgan
- County: Bandar Abbas
- Bakhsh: Fin
- Rural District: Siyahu

Population (2006)
  - Total: 17
- Time zone: UTC+3:30 (IRST)
  - Summer (DST): UTC+4:30 (IRDT)

Kalatak (Persian: كلاتك, also Romanized as Kalātak; also known as Kalātak-e Kūh-e Pā’īn) is a village in Siyahu Rural District, Fin District, Bandar Abbas County, Hormozgan Province, Iran. At the 2006 census, its population was 17, in 4 families.
