= Kargan, Kermanshah =

Kargan كرگان
- Village
- Location within Iran
- Coordinates: 34°04′23″N 47°13′22″E
- Country: Iran
- Province: Kermanshah
- County: Kermanshah
- Bakhsh: Firuzabad
- Rural District: Sar Firuzabad

Population (2006)
  - Total: 72
- Time zone: UTC+3:30 (IRST)
  - Summer (DST): UTC+4:30 (IRDT)

Kargan (Persian: كرگان, also Romanized as Kargān) is a village in Sar Firuzabad Rural District, Firuzabad District, Kermanshah County, Kermanshah Province, Iran. At the 2006 census, its population was 72, in 15 families.
