= Rigak, Chaharmahal and Bakhtiari =

Rigak ريگك
- Village
- Location within Iran
- Coordinates: 31°57′34″N 50°38′05″E
- Country: Iran
- Province: Chaharmahal and Bakhtiari
- County: Ardal
- Bakhsh: Central
- Rural District: Poshtkuh

Population (2006)
  - Total: 117
- Time zone: UTC+3:30 (IRST)
  - Summer (DST): UTC+4:30 (IRDT)

Rigak (Persian: ريگك, also Romanized as Rīgak) is a village in Poshtkuh Rural District, in the Central District of Ardal County, Chaharmahal and Bakhtiari Province, Iran. At the 2006 census, its population was 117, in 19 families.
