= Kalatak, Kohgiluyeh and Boyer-Ahmad =

Kalatak كلاتك
- Village
- Location within Iran
- Coordinates: 30°55′03″N 50°28′43″E
- Country: Iran
- Province: Kohgiluyeh and Boyer-Ahmad
- County: Kohgiluyeh
- Bakhsh: Central
- Rural District: Rak

Population (2006)
  - Total: 65
- Time zone: UTC+3:30 (IRST)
  - Summer (DST): UTC+4:30 (IRDT)

Kalatak (Persian: كلاتك, also Romanized as Kalātak) is a village in Rak Rural District, in the Central District of Kohgiluyeh County, Kohgiluyeh and Boyer-Ahmad Province, Iran. At the 2006 census, its population was 65, in 14 families.
