= Cheraghabad, Firuzabad =

Village in Kermanshah, Iran

Cheraghabad چراغ اباد
- Village
- Location within Iran
- Coordinates: 34°02′01″N 47°15′24″E
- Country: Iran
- Province: Kermanshah
- County: Kermanshah
- Bakhsh: Firuzabad
- Rural District: Sar Firuzabad

Population (2006)
  - Total: 53
- Time zone: UTC+3:30 (IRST)
  - Summer (DST): UTC+4:30 (IRDT)

Cheraghabad (Persian: چراغ اباد, also Romanized as Cherāghābād) is a village in Sar Firuzabad Rural District, Firuzabad District, Kermanshah County, Kermanshah Province, Iran. At the 2006 census, its population was 53, in 10 families.
