= Borhan, West Azerbaijan =

Tayylo Iz Colony برهان
- village
- Borhan
- Location within Iran
- Coordinates: 36°41′33″N 45°57′32″E
- Country: Iran
- Province: West Azerbaijan
- County: Mahabad
- Bakhsh: Central
- Rural District: Akhtachi-ye Gharbi

Population (2006)
  - Total: 214
- Time zone: UTC+3:30 (IRST)
  - Summer (DST): UTC+4:30 (IRDT)

Borhan (Persian: برهان, also Romanized as Borhān) is a village in Akhtachi-ye Gharbi Rural District, in the Central District of Mahabad County, West Azerbaijan Province, Iran. At the 2006 census, its population was 214, in 41 families.
