= Band-e Zarak District =

District in Hormozgan province, Iran

Band-e Zarak District Persian: بخش بندزرک
- District
- Location within Iran
- Coordinates: 27°00′33″N 57°01′01″E
- Country: Iran
- Province: Hormozgan
- County: Minab
- Capital: Band-e Zarak

Population (2016)
  - Total: 47,845
- Time zone: UTC+3:30 (IRST)

Band-e Zarak District (Persian: بخش بندزرک) is in Minab County, Hormozgan province, Iran. Its capital is the city of Band-e Zarak.

== History ==
After the 2006 National Census, Band-e Zarak Rural District was separated from the Central District in the formation of Band-e Zarak District.

In 2019, three villages in the district were elevated to city status: Band-e Zarak, Kargan and Zehuki.

== Demographics ==
=== Population ===
At the time of the 2011 census, the district's population was 42,929 people in 9,888 households. The 2016 census measured the population of the district as 47,845 inhabitants in 12,556 households.

=== Administrative divisions ===
Band-e Zarak District Population
Administrative Divisions	2011	2016
Band-e Zarak RD	30,548	34,121
Kargan RD	12,381	13,724
Band-e Zarak (city) (Note: Became a city after the 2016 census)		
Kargan (city) (Note: Became a city after the 2016 census)		
Zehuki (city) (Note: Became a city after the 2016 census)		
Total	42,929	47,845
RD = Rural District
