= Kariyan District =

District in Hormozgan province, Iran

Kariyan District Persian: بخش کریان
- District
- Location within Iran
- Coordinates: 26°57′53″N 57°13′08″E
- Country: Iran
- Province: Hormozgan
- County: Minab
- Capital: Kariyan
- Time zone: UTC+3:30 (IRST)

Kariyan District (Persian: بخش کریان) is in Minab County, Hormozgan province, Iran. Its capital is the village of Kariyan, whose population at the time of the 2016 National Census was 5,000 in 1,369 households.

== History ==
After the 2016 census, Kariyan Rural District was separated from the Central District in the establishment of Kariyan District.

== Demographics ==
=== Administrative divisions ===
Kariyan District
Administrative Divisions
Kariyan RD
Talang RD
RD = Rural District
