= Gurband Rural District =

Rural district in Hormozgan province, Iran

Gurband Rural District Persian: دهستان گوربند
- Rural District
- Location within Iran
- Coordinates: 27°20′58″N 57°01′25″E
- Country: Iran
- Province: Hormozgan
- County: Minab
- District: Central
- Capital: Gurband

Population (2016)
  - Total: 14,087
- Time zone: UTC+3:30 (IRST)

Gurband Rural District (Persian: دهستان گوربند) is in the Central District of Minab County, Hormozgan province, Iran. Its capital is the village of Gurband.

== Demographics ==
=== Population ===
At the time of the 2006 National Census, the rural district's population was 16,513 in 3,569 households. There were 17,761 inhabitants in 4,332 households at the following census of 2011. The 2016 census measured the population of the rural district as 14,087 in 4,078 households. The most populous of its 14 villages was Hajji Khademi, with 2,955 people.
