= Tiyab District =

District in Hormozgan province, Iran

Tiyab District Persian: بخش تیاب
- District
- Location within Iran
- Coordinates: 27°08′55″N 56°53′04″E
- Country: Iran
- Province: Hormozgan
- County: Minab
- Capital: Tiyab
- Time zone: UTC+3:30 (IRST)

Tiyab District (Persian: بخش تیاب) is in Minab County, Hormozgan province, Iran. Its capital is the village of Tiyab, whose population at the time of the 2016 National Census was 827 people in 265 households.

== History ==
After the 2016 census, Tiyab Rural District was separated from the Central District in the formation of Tiyab District.

== Demographics ==
=== Administrative divisions ===
Tiyab District
Administrative Divisions
Sarbaran RD
Tiyab RD
RD = Rural District
