= Tukahur Rural District =

Rural district in Hormozgan province, Iran

Tukahur Rural District Persian: دهستان توكهور
- Rural District
- Location within Iran
- Coordinates: 27°04′28″N 57°22′49″E
- Country: Iran
- Province: Hormozgan
- County: Minab
- District: Tukahur
- Capital: Tukahur

Population (2016)
  - Total: 8,605
- Time zone: UTC+3:30 (IRST)

Tukahur Rural District (Persian: دهستان توكهور) is in Tukahur District of Minab County, Hormozgan province, Iran. Its capital is the village of Tukahur. The previous capital of the rural district was the village of Hasht Bandi, now a city.

== Demographics ==
=== Population ===
At the time of the 2006 National Census, the rural district's population was 7,852 in 1,657 households. There were 8,350 inhabitants in 2,035 households at the following census of 2011. The 2016 census measured the population of the rural district as 8,605 in 2,383 households. The most populous of its 13 villages was Chah Gharbal, with 2,282 people.
