= Tiyab Rural District =

Rural district in Hormozgan province, Iran

Tiyab Rural District Persian: دهستان تياب
- Rural District
- Location within Iran
- Coordinates: 27°07′53″N 56°55′00″E
- Country: Iran
- Province: Hormozgan
- County: Minab
- District: Tiyab
- Capital: Nakhl-e Ebrahimi

Population (2016)
  - Total: 20,271
- Time zone: UTC+3:30 (IRST)

Tiyab Rural District (Persian: دهستان تياب) is in Tiyab District of Minab County, Hormozgan province, Iran. Its capital is the village of Nakhl-e Ebrahimi. The previous capital of the rural district was the village of Tiyab.

== Demographics ==
=== Population ===
At the time of the 2006 National Census, the rural district's population (as a part of the Central District) was 17,835 in 3,527 households. There were 19,642 inhabitants in 4,647 households at the following census of 2011. The 2016 census measured the population of the rural district as 20,271 in 5,435 households. The most populous of its 19 villages was Kolahi, with 5,686 people.

After the census, the rural district was separated from the district in the formation of Tiyab District.
