= Cheraghabad Rural District =

Rural district in Hormozgan province, Iran

Cheraghabad Rural District Persian: دهستان چراغ آباد
- Rural District
- Location within Iran
- Coordinates: 27°07′35″N 57°27′54″E
- Country: Iran
- Province: Hormozgan
- County: Minab
- District: Tukahur
- Capital: Hasht Bandi

Population (2016)
  - Total: 15,241
- Time zone: UTC+3:30 (IRST)

Cheraghabad Rural District (Persian: دهستان چراغ آباد) is in Tukahur District of Minab County, Hormozgan province, Iran. It is administered from the city of Hasht Bandi.

== Demographics ==
=== Population ===
At the time of the 2006 National Census, the rural district's population was 18,281 in 3,831 households. There were 13,619 inhabitants in 3,214 households at the following census of 2011. The 2016 census measured the population of the rural district as 15,241 in 4,001 households. The most populous of its 25 villages was Mojtame-ye Emam, with 2,335 people.
