= Kariyan Rural District =

Rural district in Hormozgan province, Iran

Kariyan Rural District Persian: دهستان كريان
- Rural District
- Location within Iran
- Coordinates: 27°03′51″N 57°11′51″E
- Country: Iran
- Province: Hormozgan
- County: Minab
- District: Kariyan
- Capital: Ravang

Population (2016)
  - Total: 16,814
- Time zone: UTC+3:30 (IRST)

Kariyan Rural District (Persian: دهستان كريان) is in Kariyan District of Minab County, Hormozgan province, Iran. Its capital is the village of Ravang. The previous capital of the rural district was the village of Kariyan.

== Demographics ==
=== Population ===
At the time of the 2006 National Census, the rural district's population (as a part of the Central District) was 14,537 in 2,863 households. There were 15,203 inhabitants in 3,781 households at the following census of 2011. The 2016 census measured the population of the rural district as 16,814 in 4,522 households. The most populous of its 38 villages was Kariyan, with 5,000 people.

After the census, the rural district was separated from the district in the formation of Kariyan District.
