= Band-e Zarak Rural District =

Rural district in Hormozgan province, Iran

Band-e Zarak Rural District Persian: دهستان بندزرك
- Rural District
- Location within Iran
- Coordinates: 27°03′19″N 57°00′01″E
- Country: Iran
- Province: Hormozgan
- County: Minab
- District: Band-e Zarak
- Capital: Band-e Zarak

Population (2016)
  - Total: 34,121
- Time zone: UTC+3:30 (IRST)

Band-e Zarak Rural District (Persian: دهستان بندزرك) is in Band-e Zarak District of Minab County, Hormozgan province, Iran. It is administered from the city of Band-e Zarak.

== Demographics ==
=== Population ===
At the time of the 2006 National Census, the rural district's population (as a part of the Central District) was 39,334 in 7,442 households. There were 30,548 inhabitants in 7,139 households at the following census of 2011, by which time the rural district had been separated from the district in the formation of Band-e Zarak District. The 2016 census measured the population of the rural district as 34,121 in 9,051 households. The most populous of its 32 villages was Band-e Zarak (now a city), with 4,796 people.
