= Howmeh Rural District (Minab County) =

Rural district in Hormozgan province, Iran

Howmeh Rural District Persian: دهستان حومه
- Rural District
- Location within Iran
- Coordinates: 27°10′43″N 57°01′25″E
- Country: Iran
- Province: Hormozgan
- County: Minab
- District: Central
- Capital: Hakami

Population (2016)
  - Total: 29,437
- Time zone: UTC+3:30 (IRST)

Howmeh Rural District (Persian: دهستان حومه) is in the Central District of Minab County, Hormozgan province, Iran. Its capital is the village of Hakami.

== Demographics ==
=== Population ===
At the time of the 2006 National Census, the rural district's population was 27,577 in 5,551 households. There were 26,910 inhabitants in 6,529 households at the following census of 2011. The 2016 census measured the population of the rural district as 29,437 in 8,064 households. The most populous of its 41 villages was Hakami, with 4,446 people.
