= Tukahur District =

District in Hormozgan province, Iran

Tukahur District Persian: بخش توکهور
- District
- Location within Iran
- Coordinates: 27°06′26″N 57°25′09″E
- Country: Iran
- Province: Hormozgan
- County: Minab
- Capital: Hasht Bandi

Population (2016)
  - Total: 30,564
- Time zone: UTC+3:30 (IRST)

Tukahur District (Persian: بخش توکهور) is in Minab County, Hormozgan province, Iran. Its capital is the city of Hasht Bandi.

== History ==
After the 2006 National Census, the village of Hasht Bandi was elevated to the status of a city.

== Demographics ==
=== Population ===
At the time of the 2006 census, the district's population was 26,133 in 5,488 households. The following census in 2011 counted 26,407 people in 6,275 households. The 2016 census measured the population of the district as 30,564 inhabitants in 8,094 households.

=== Administrative divisions ===
Tukahur District Population
Administrative Divisions	2006	2011	2016
Cheraghabad RD	18,281	13,619	15,241
Tukahur RD	7,852	8,350	8,605
Hasht Bandi (city)		4,438	6,718
Total	26,133	26,407	30,564
RD = Rural District
