= Central District (Minab County) =

District in Hormozgan province, Iran

Central District (Minab County) Persian: بخش مرکزی شهرستان میناب
- District
- Location within Iran
- Coordinates: 27°15′10″N 57°01′32″E
- Country: Iran
- Province: Hormozgan
- County: Minab
- Capital: Minab

Population (2016)
  - Total: 158,650
- Time zone: UTC+3:30 (IRST)

The Central District of Minab County (Persian: بخش مرکزی شهرستان میناب) is in Hormozgan province, Iran. Its capital is the city of Minab.

== History ==
After the 2006 National Census, Band-e Zarak Rural District was separated from the district in the formation of Band-e Zarak District. After the 2011 census, the village of Tirur was elevated to the status of a city.

After the 2016 census, Kariyan Rural District was separated from the Central District in the formation of Kariyan District. Tiyab Rural District was also separated from the district to form Tiyab District.

== Demographics ==
=== Population ===
At the time of the 2006 census, the district's population was 170,419 in 34,176 households. The following census in 2011 counted 142,745 people in 34,461 households. The 2016 census measured the population of the district as 158,650 inhabitants in 42,487 households.

=== Administrative divisions ===
Central District (Minab County) Population
Administrative Divisions	2006	2011	2016
Band-e Zarak RD (Note: Transferred to Band-e Zarak District)	39,334		
Gurband RD	16,513	17,761	14,087
Howmeh RD	27,577	26,910	29,437
Kariyan RD (Note: Transferred to Karian District after the 2016 census)	14,537	15,203	16,814
Tiyab RD (Note: Transferred to Tiab District after the 2016 census)	17,835	19,642	20,271
Minab (city)	54,623	63,229	73,170
Tirur (city)			4,871
Total	170,419	142,745	158,650
RD = Rural District

== See also ==
- 2026 Minab school airstrike, during the 2026 Israeli–United States strikes on Iran
