= Minab County =

County in Hormozgan province, Iran

Minab County Persian: شهرستان میناب
- County
- Location of Minab County in Hormozgan province (right, purple)

- Location of Hormozgan province in Iran
- Coordinates: 26°58′N 57°22′E
- Country: Iran
- Province: Hormozgan
- Capital: Minab
- Districts: Central, Band-e Zarak, Kariyan, Senderk, Tiyab, Tukahur

Area
  - Total: 5,103 km^{2} (1,970 sq mi)

Population (2016)
  - Total: 259,221
  - Density: 50.80/km^{2} (131.6/sq mi)
- Time zone: UTC+3:30 (IRST)

Minab County (Persian: شهرستان میناب) is in Hormozgan province, Iran. Its capital is the city of Minab.

== History ==
After the 2006 National Census, Biyaban District was separated from the county in the establishment of Sirik County. Band-e Zarak Rural District was separated from the Central District in the formation of Band-e Zarak District, including the new Kargan Rural District. The villages of Hasht Bandi and Senderk rose to city status.

After the 2011 census, the village of Tirur was elevated to the status of a city.

After the 2016 census, Kariyan Rural District was separated from the Central District in the formation of Kariyan District, including the new Talang Rural District. Tiyab Rural District was also separated from the Central District in the formation of Tiyab District, including the new Sarbaran Rural District.

In 2019, three villages in Band-e Zarak District were elevated to city status: Band-e Zarak, Kargan and Zehuki.

== Demographics ==
=== Population ===
At the time of the 2006 census, the county's population was 254,304 in 50,478 households. The following census in 2011 counted 235,705 people in 56,106 households. The 2016 census measured the population of the county as 259,221 in 68,906 households.

=== Administrative divisions ===
Minab County's population history and administrative structure over three consecutive censuses are shown in the following table.

Minab County Population
Administrative Divisions	2006	2011	2016
Central District	170,419	142,745	158,650
Band-e Zarak RD	39,334		
Gurband RD	16,513	17,761	14,087
Howmeh RD	27,577	26,910	29,437
Kariyan RD	14,537	15,203	16,814
Tiyab RD	17,835	19,642	20,271
Minab (city)	54,623	63,229	73,170
Tirur (city)			4,871
Band-e Zarak District		42,929	47,845
Band-e Zarak RD		30,548	34,121
Kargan RD		12,381	13,724
Band-e Zarak (city) (Note: Became a city after the 2016 census)			
Kargan (city) (Note: Became a city after the 2016 census)			
Zehuki (city) (Note: Became a city after the 2016 census)			
Biyaban District (Note: Transferred to Sirik County)	38,251		
Bemani RD	11,633		
Biyaban RD	11,667		
Sirik RD	11,311		
Sirik (city)	3,640		
Kariyan District (Note: Established after the 2016 census)			
Kariyan RD			
Talang RD			
Senderk District	19,501	23,624	22,126
Bondar RD	3,512	4,038	3,730
Darpahn RD	6,118	7,832	7,537
Senderk RD	9,871	9,730	8,944
Senderk (city)		2,024	1,915
Tiyab District (Note: Established after the 2016 census)			
Sarbaran RD			
Tiyab RD			
Tukahur District	26,133	26,407	30,564
Cheraghabad RD	18,281	13,619	15,241
Tukahur RD	7,852	8,350	8,605
Hasht Bandi (city)		4,438	6,718
Total	254,304	235,705	259,221
RD = Rural District

== See also ==
Media related to Minab County at Wikimedia Commons

- 2026 Minab school airstrike, during the 2026 Israeli–United States strikes on Iran
