= Gujarat under Akbar =

In 1573, Mughal Emperor Akbar conquered Gujarat Sultanate (now Gujarat, India) taking advantage of young Gujarat Sultan Muzaffar Shah III and his quarrelling nobles. Muzaffar was held captive at Agra. He appointed his foster brother Mírza Âzíz Kokaltásh as the first viceroy who faced an insurrection by the rebel nobles of the former Sultanate. Akbar quickly came to aid and ended the insurrection. He soon appointed Mírza Khán who managed to set revenue system and quelled attack by the Mirzas with help of Mughal minister Todar Mal. The next viceroy Shaháb-ud-dín strengthened the military. Soon Sultan Muzaffar escaped, returned to Gujarat and led an attack on Ahmedabad and recaptured it before his former noble and now viceroy Itimad Khan reach the city. Soon Mirza Khan was reappointed as the viceroy who defeated Muzaffar in the battle of Fatehwadi in 1584. Soon Kokaltásh returned as the viceroy and defeated Muzaffar and combined Kathiawad forces in battle of Bhuchar Mori. Later Muzaffar was captured but he committed suicide, putting an end to the Gujarat Sultanate. As Kokaltásh went to the Mecca on pilgrimage, Sultan Murad Bakhsh was appointed as the viceroy on whose death, Kokaltásh returned third time as the viceroy. Akbar was succeeded by Jehangir.

== Background ==
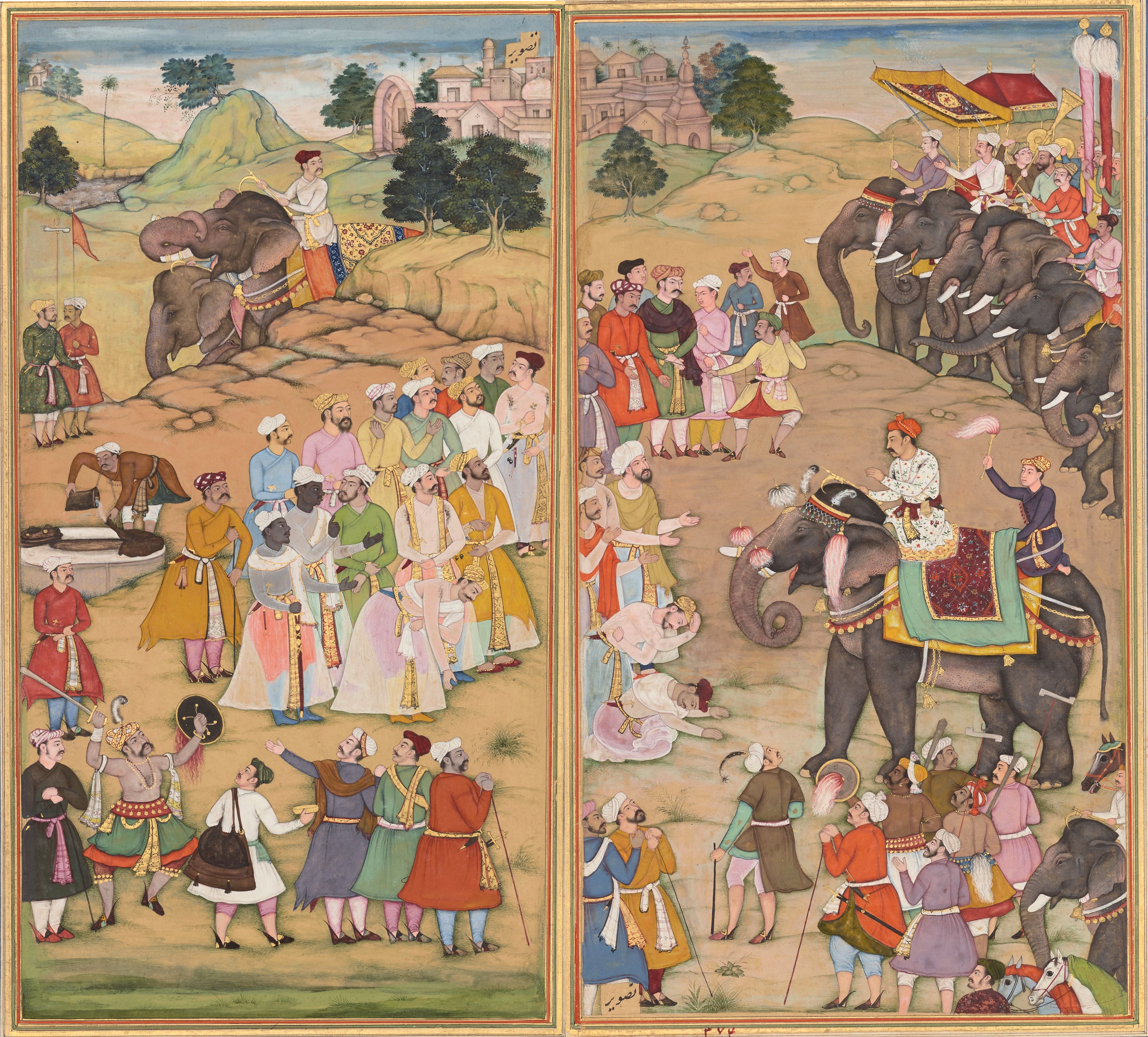
Itimad Khan and the nobles of Gujarat submit to Akbar, November 1572.jpg

The last two Gujarat Sultans, Ahmad Shah III and Mahmud Shah III, were raised to throne when they were young. So the nobles were had decided to carry on the government under one noble as a regent of the Sultan and they further divided the country among themselves. But the nobles had their own aspirations so started looking for opportunity to expand their territories with intention of the supremacy. On one such occasion, the noble named Ítimád Khán requested help from the Mughal Emperor Akbar who promptly agreed to help. Early in July 1572, he invaded Gujarat. He first captured Disa and then Patan and appointed a governor. The most Gujarat nobles soon surrendered to him and the rebel nobles fled to other parts of Gujarat. Akbar reached Ahmedabad, the capital of Gujarat Sultanate. He advanced to Cambay and later the Mirzas controlling southern Gujarat were defeated and Bharuch and Surat was captured.

== Viceroys under Akbar (1573–1605) ==
=== Mirza Âzíz Kokaltash, First Viceroy, 1573–1575 ===
During his conquest, on leaving Khambaht to expel the Mírzas, Akbar appointed his general and foster brother Mírza Âzíz Kokaltásh as his first viceroy of Gujarát. He placed Surat in the charge of Kalíj Khán.

Muhammad Khán; son of Sher Khán Fauládi, the noble who previously held Patan; who had fled to the Idar hills, now returned and took the city of Pátan, besieging the Mughal governor, Sayad Áhmed Khán Bárha, in the citadel. At this time another noble Mírza Muhammad Husain was at Ranpur near Dhandhuka. When Sher Khán Fauládi, who had taken refuge in Sorath, heard of Muhammad Khán's return to Pátan, he met Mírza Muhammad Husain, and uniting their forces they joined Muhammad Khán at Pátan. The viceroy Mírza Âzíz Kokaltásh with other nobles marched against them, and after a hard-fought battle, in which several of the imperial nobles were slain, Mírza Âzíz Kokaltásh was victorious. Sher Khán again took refuge in Sorath, and his son fled for safety to the Ídar hills, while the Mírza withdrew to the Khandesh frontier. As the conquest of Gujarát was completed in 1573, Akbar returned to Agra.

Before leaving Gujarát Akbar placed the charge of the province in the hands of Mírza Âzíz Kokaltásh. (Note: According to the Áin-i-Akbari (Blochmann, I. 325), the province of Gujarát over which the Kokaltásh was placed did not pass further south than the Mahi River.) At the same time the emperor rewarded his supporters by grants of land, assigning Ahmedabad with Petlad and several other districts to the viceroy Mírza Âzíz, Pátan to the Khán-i-Kalán Mír Muhammad Khán, and Baroda to Nawáb Aurang Khán. Bharuch was given to Kutb-ud-dín Muhammad, and Dholka Khánpur and Sami were confirmed to Sayad Hámid and Sayad Mahmúd Bukhári. As soon as the emperor Akbar left, Ikhtiyár-ul-Mulk and Muhammad Khán, son of Sher Khán, who had taken shelter in the Ídar hills, issued forth, and the viceroy marched to Ahmednagar (now Himatnagar) to hold them in check. Mírza Muhammad Husain advancing rapidly from the Nandurbar frontier, took the fort of Bharuch, and went then to Cambay (now Khambhat) which he found abandoned by its governor Husain Khán Karkaráh, while he himself marched to Ahmednagar and Ídar against Ikhtiyár-ul-Mulk. The viceroy ordered Sayad Hámid Bukhári, Nawáb Naurang Khán, and others to join Kutb-ud-dín Muhammad Khán. They went and laid siege to Cambay, but Mírza Muhammad managed to evacuate the town and join Ikhtiyár-ul-Mulk and Muhammad Khán.

Insurrection Quelled by Akbar, 1573

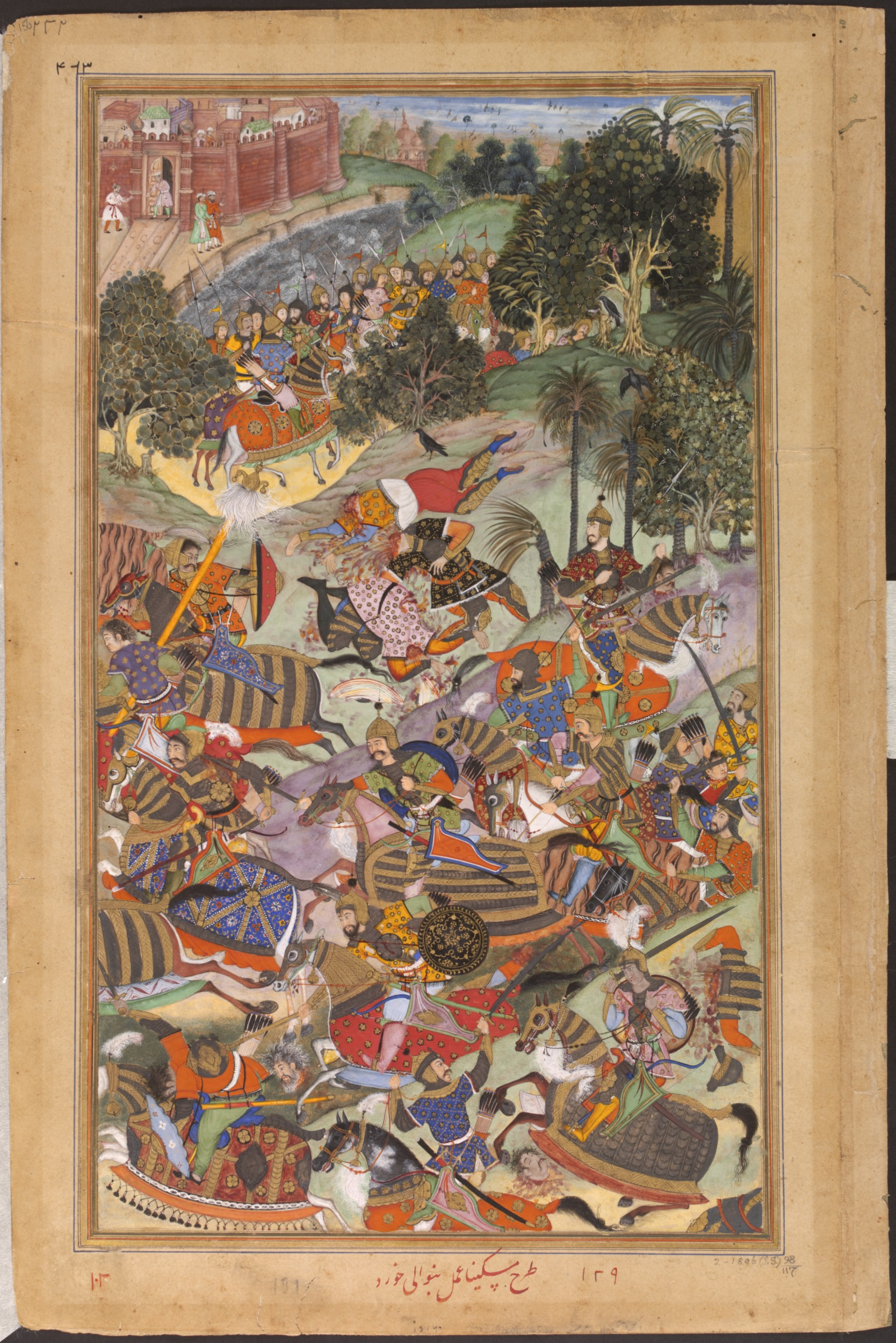
The Battle between the Mughal Army and Muhammad Husain Mirza near Ahmadabad, 1573, Akbarnama

After several unsuccessful attempts to scatter the enemy, the viceroy retired to Áhmedábád, and the rebels laid siege to the city. Kutb-ud-dín Khán, Sayad Mírán, and others of the Mughal party succeeded in entering the city and joining the garrison. After the siege had lasted two months, Akbar, making his famous 600 mile (400 kos) march in nine days from Agra, arrived before Áhmedábád, and, at once engaging the enemy, totally defeated them with the loss of two of their leaders Mírza Muhammad Husain and Ikhtiyár-ul-Mulk.

On the day before the battle Akbar consulting a Hazára Afghán versed in drawing omens from sheep's shoulder-blades, was told that victory was certain, but that it would be won at the cost of the life of one of his nobles. Seif Khán, brother of Zein Khán Koka, coming in prayed that he should be chosen to receive the crown of martyrdom. At the end of the day the only leading noble that was killed was Seif Khán. (Note: Tuzuki Jehángíri or Jehángír's Memoirs, Pers. Text, Sayad Áhmed Khán's Edition page 20. For Akbar's march compare Tabakát-i-Akbari in Elliot, V. 365 and Blochman's Áin-i-Akbari, I. 325 and note. The Mirăt-i-Áhmedi (Pers. Text, 131) records these further details: When starting from his last camp, Akbar began to mount his horse on the day of the battle that took place near Áhmedábád. The royal steed unable to bear the weight of the hero laden with the spirit of victory sat down. Rája Bhagwándás Kachwáhah ran up to the rather embarrassed emperor and offered him his congratulations saying: This, your Majesty, is the surest sign of victory. There are also two further signs: the wind blows from our back and the kites and vultures accompany our host.)

After only eleven days' stay, Akbar again entrusting the government of Gujarát to Mírza Âzíz Koka, returned to Agra. Mírza Âzíz Koka did not long continue viceroy. In 1575, in consequence of some dispute with the emperor, he retired into private life.

=== Mírza Khán, Second Viceroy, 1575–1577 ===
On his resignation, Akbar conferred the post of viceroy on Mírza Khán, son of Behrám Khán, who afterwards rose to the high rank of Khán Khánán or chief of the nobles. As this was Mírza Khán's first service, and as he was still a youth, he was ordered to follow the advice of the deputy viceroy, Wazír Khán, in whose hands the administration of the province remained during the two following years.

Survey by Rája Todar Mal.

Soon after the insurrection of 1573 was suppressed the emperor sent his minister Rája Todar Mal to make a survey settlement of the province. In 1575 after the survey was completed Wajíh-ul-Mulk Gujaráti was appointed díwán or minister. Some historians say that in 1576 Wazír Khán relieved Mírza Âzíz Koka as viceroy, but according to the Mirăt-i-Áhmedi Mirza Khán held office with Wazír Khán as his deputy. One Prágdás, a Hindu, succeeded Wajíh-ul-Mulk as díwán. Troops were sent to reduce the Nándod and Ídar districts, and the fort of Sirohi was captured by Tarsu Khán, the military governor of Pátan. Afterwards, through the intervention of Pahár Khán Jálori, the Sirohi Rája, at an interview with Rája Todar Mal, presented Rupees 12,000 and other articles and was allowed to serve the provincial governor of Gujarát with 1500 horse.

During Wazír Khán's administration Muzaffar Husain Mírza, son of Ibráhím Husain Mírza, raised an insurrection in Gujarát. This Mírza Muzaffar was as an infant carried to the Dakhan (Deccan) from Surat shortly before its capture by Akbar. He lived peacefully till under the influence of an ambitious retainer Mihr Ali by name, he gathered an army and entered Nandurbar. Wazír Khán distrusting his troops shut himself in a fortress, and wrote to Rája Todar Mal, who was in Pátan settling revenue affairs. The Mírza defeated the Mughal forces in Nandurbár and failing to get possession of Cambay (now Khambhat) marched straight to Áhmedábád. On the advance of Rája Todar Mal, the Mírza fell back on Dholka. The Rája and the Khán pursuing defeated him, and he retired to Junagadh. The Rája then withdrew, but the Mírza again advanced and besieged him in Áhmedábád. In an attempt to escalade the city wall, Mihr Ali was killed. Muzaffar Mírza withdrew to Khándesh and the insurrection came to an end.

=== Shaháb-ud-dín, Third Viceroy, 1577–1583 ===
In the end of 1577, as Wazír Khán's management was not successful, the post of viceroy was conferred upon Shaháb-ud-dín Áhmed Khán, the governor of Malwa. Shaháb-ud-dín's first step was to create new military posts and strengthen the old ones.

Sends a Force against Junágaḍh

At this time Fateh Khán Shirwáni, the commander of Amín Khán Ghori's army, quarrelled with his chief, and, coming to Shaháb-ud-dín, offered to capture the fort of Junagadh. Shaháb-ud-dín entertained his proposal, and sent his nephew Mírza Khán and 4000 horse with him. When the troops crossed the Sorath frontier, they were met by envoys from Amín Khán, agreeing, in his name, to pay tribute and surrender the country, provided he were permitted to retain the fortress of Junágaḍh and were allotted a sufficient grant of land. Mírza Khán rejected these proposals and continued his march against Junágaḍh. Amín Khán made a vigorous resistance and applied for aid to the Jám of Nawanagar State. At this juncture Fateh Khán died, and Mírza Khán went and besieged Mangrol. The Jám's minister Isá now joined Amín Khán with 4000 horse, and he, quitting Junágaḍh, marched to Mangrol. On their approach Mírza Khán retired to the town of Kodinar followed by Amín Khán. Here a pitched battle was fought, and Mírza Khán was defeated with the loss of his baggage. Many of his men were slain, and he himself, being wounded, escaped with difficulty to Áhmedábád. Shaháb ud-dín, who had meanwhile been giving his attention to revenue matters, and to the more correct measurement of the lands of the province, was rudely recalled from these peaceful occupations by his nephew's defeat.

Muzaffar Shah III returns Gujarat

During the same time, the former Gujarat Sultan, Muzaffar Shah III escaped to Gujarat from his imprisonment in Agra in 1583. Muzaffar remained for some time in the Rajpipla country, and then came to one Lúna or Lúmbha Káthi, at the village of Khíri in the district of Sardhár in Sorath.

=== Ítimád Khán Gujaráti, Fourth Viceroy, 1583–84 ===
Ítimád Khán Gujaráti was appointed viceroy by Akbar soon in 1583 in place of Shaháb-ud-dín. At this time a party of 700 or 800 Mughals, called Wazír Khánis, separating from Shaháb-ud-dín, remained behind in hope of being entertained by the new viceroy. As Ítimád Khán declared that he was unable to take them into his service, they went off in a body and joined Muzaffar at Khíri, and he with them and three or four thousand Káthi horse marched at once on Áhmedábád. On hearing this Ítimád Khán, leaving his son Sher Khán in Áhmedábád, followed Shaháb-ud-dín to Kadi, and entreated him to return. Shaháb-ud-dín at first affected indifference telling Ítimád that as he had given over charge he had no more interest in the province. After two days, he consented to return if Ítimád stated in writing that the country was on the verge of being lost and that Ítimád being unable to hold it was obliged to relinquish charge to Shaháb-ud-dín. Ítimád Khán made the required statement and Shaháb-ud-dín returned with him.

Muzaffar captures Áhmedábád, 1583

Meanwhile, Muzaffar Sháh reached Áhmedábád, which was weakly defended, and in 1583, after a brief struggle, took possession of the city. While the siege of Áhmedábád was in progress, Shaháb-ud-dín and Ítimád Khán were returning, and were within a few miles of the city, when news of its capture reached them. They continued their advance, but had barely arrived at Áhmedábád when Muzaffar Sháh totally defeated them taking all their baggage. Seeing the issue of the fight, most of their army went over to Muzaffar Sháh III, and the viceroy and Shaháb-ud-dín with a few men fled to Pátan. Kutb-ud-dín Muhammad Khán Atkah, one of the Mughal commanders, who was on the Khándesh frontier, now advanced by forced marches to Baroda. Muzaffar marched against him with a large army, recently strengthened by the union of the army of Sayad Daulát, ruler of Cambay. Kutb-ud-dín threw himself into Baroda, and, in spite of the treachery of his troops, defended the city for some time. At last, on Muzaffar's assurance that his life should be spared Kutb-ud-dín repaired to the enemies' camp to treat for peace. On his arrival, he was treated with respect, but next day was treacherously put to death.

The fort of Bharuch was also at this time traitorously surrendered to Muzaffar by the slaves of the mother of Naurang Khán, fief-holder of the district.

=== Mírza Abdúr-Rahím Khán (Khán Khánán), Fifth Viceroy, 1583–1587 ===
Battle of Fatehwadi

On learning of the Gujarát insurrection, the emperor Akbar, at the close of 1583, conferred the government of the province on Mírza Abdúr-Rahím Khán, son of Behrám Khán, who had formerly (1575) acted as viceroy. Muzaffar, who was still at Broach, hearing of the advance of the new viceroy with a large army, returned rapidly to Áhmedábád, and in 1584 fought a pitched battle with Mírza Abdúr-Rahím Khán between Sarkhej and Sháh Bhíkan's tomb. In this engagement Muzaffar was entirely defeated, and fled to Cambay (Khambhat) pursued by Mírza Abdúr-Rahím Khán. Muzaffar now hearing that Mírza Abdúr-Rahím Khán had been joined by Naurang Khán and other nobles with the Mughal army from Málwa, quitted Cambay, and made for his old place of shelter in Rajpipla.

Finding no rest in Rájpípla, after fighting and losing another battle in the Rájpípla hills, he fled first to Pátan and then to Ídar, and afterwards again repaired to Lúmbha Káthi in Khiri. In reward for these two victories, the emperor bestowed on Mírza Abdúr-Rahím Khán the title of Khán Khánán. Bharuch now submitted, and Muzaffar sought shelter with Amín Khán Ghori at Junagadh, by whom he was allotted the town of Gondal as a residence. Muzaffar made one more attempt to establish his power. He advanced to Morbi, and thence made a raid on Radhanpur and plundered that town, but was soon compelled to return to Kathiawad and seek safety in flight. Amín Khán, seeing that his cause was hopeless, on pretence of aiding him, induced Muzaffar to give him some money, two lakh Mahmudi. (Note: The mahmúdi varied in value from about one-third to one-half of a rupee.) When he had obtained the money, on one pretext or another, Amín Khán withheld the promised aid.

The Khán Khánán now marched an army into Sorath against Muzaffar. The Jám of Navánagar and Amín Khán sent their envoys to meet the viceroy, declaring that they had not sheltered Muzaffar, and that he was leading an outlaw's life, entirely unaided by them. The viceroy agreed not to molest them, on condition that they withheld aid and shelter from Muzaffar, and himself marched against him. When he reached Upleta, about fifteen miles north-west of the fortress of Junágaḍh, the viceroy heard that Muzaffar had sought shelter in the Barda hills in the south-west corner of the Kathiawar peninsula. Advancing to the hills, he halted his main force outside of the rough country and sent skirmishing parties to examine the hills. Muzaffar had already passed through Navánagar and across Gujarát to Danta in the Mahi Kantha. Here he was once more defeated by the Prantij garrison, and a third time took refuge in Rájpípla. The viceroy now marched on Navánagar to punish the Jám. The Jám sent in his submission, and the viceroy taking from him, by way of fine, an elephant and some valuable horses, returned to Áhmedábád. He next sent a detachment against Ghazni Khán of Jalore who had favoured Muzaffar. Ghazni Khán submitted, and no further steps were taken against him.

=== Ismáíl Kuli Khán, Sixth Viceroy, 1587–88 and Mírza Âziz Kokaltásh, Seventh Viceroy, 1588–1592 ===
Battle of Bhuchar Mori

In 1587, the Khán Khánán was replaced by Ismáíl Kuli Khán as a governor. Ismáíl's government lasted only for a few months, when he was superseded by Mírza Âziz Kokaltásh, who was a second time appointed viceroy. In 1591, Muzaffar again returned to Sorath. The viceroy, hearing that he had been joined by the Jám of Nawanagar State, the Cutch State chief, and Daulat Khán Ghori the son of Amín Khán, marched with a large army towards Sorath, and, halting at Viramgam, sent forward a detachment under Naurang Khán, Sayad Kásim, and other officers. Advancing as far as Morbi, Naurang Khán entered into negotiations with the Jám, who, however, refused to accede to the demands of the imperial commander. On this the viceroy joined Naurang Khán with the bulk of his army, and after a short delay marched on Nawánagar. On his way, at a plateau called Bhuchar Mori at the village of Dhrol near Nawánagar, Muzaffar and the Jám opposed him, and an obstinate battle in which the imperialists were nearly worsted, ended in Muzaffar's defeat. The son and minister of the Jám were slain, and Muzaffar, the Jám, and Daulat Khán who was wounded, fled to the fortress of Junágaḍh. The viceroy now advanced and plundered Nawánagar, and remaining there sent Naurang Khán, Sayad Kásím, and Gújar Khán against Junágaḍh. The day the army arrived before the fortress Daulat Khán died of his wounds. Still the fortress held out, and though the viceroy joined them the siege made little progress as the imperial troops were in great straits for grain. The viceroy returned to Áhmedábád, and after seven or eight months again marched against Junágaḍh. The Jám, who was still a fugitive, sent envoys and promised to aid the viceroy if his country were restored to him. The viceroy assented on condition that, during the operations against Junágaḍh, the Jám should furnish his army with grain. The Jám agreed to provide grain, and after a siege of three months the garrison surrendered.

Muzaffar Shah III's last days

News was next received that Muzaffar had taken refuge at Dwarka (also known as Jagat). The viceroy at once sent Naurang Khán and others with an army in pursuit. On reaching Jagat it was found that Muzaffar had already left for a village owned by a Rájput named Sewa Wádhel. Without halting Naurang Khán started in pursuit, nearly surprising Muzaffar, who escaping on horseback with a few followers, crossed to Cutch (now Kachchh). Sewa Wádhel covering Muzaffar's retreat was surprised before he could put to sea and fought gallantly with the imperial forces till he was slain. Naurang Khán then came to Arámra, a village belonging to Singrám Wádhel, Rája of Dwarka, and after frustrating a scheme devised by that chief to entrap a body of the troops on board ship under pretence of pursuing Muzaffar's family, led his men back to Junágaḍh. The viceroy, hearing in what direction Muzaffar had fled, marched to Morbi, where the Jám of Navánagar came and paid his respects. At the same time the Cutch chief, who is called Rao Bháramalji I, sent a message that if the viceroy would refrain from invading his country and would give him his ancestral district of Morbi and supply him with a detachment of troops, he would point out where Muzaffar was concealed. The Khán-i-Ázam agreed to these terms and the chief captured Muzaffar and handed him to the force sent to secure him.

The detachment, strictly guarding the prisoner, were marching rapidly towards Morbi, when, on reaching Dhrol, about thirty miles east of Nawanagar (now Jamnagar), under pretence of obeying a call of nature, Muzaffar withdrew and cut his throat with a knife, so that he died. This happened in 1592. The viceroy sent Muzaffar's head to court of Akbar.

The viceroy was now recalled by Akbar, he delayed on pretence of wishing to humble the Portuguese. His real object was to make a pilgrimage to Mecca, and in 1592, after obtaining the necessary permission from the Portuguese, he started from Veraval. During this viceroyalty, an imperial farmán ordered that the state share of the produce should be one-half and the other half should be left to the cultivator and further that from each half five per cent should be deducted for the village headmen. All other taxes were declared illegal, and it was provided that when lands or houses were sold, half the government demand should be realized from the seller and half from the buyer.

=== Shahzádá Murád Mirza Eighth Viceroy, 1592–1600 ===
The emperor, who was much vexed to hear of the departure of the viceroy, appointed prince Murad in his stead with as his minister Muhammad Sádikkhán one of the great nobles. In 1593–94 Mírza Âzíz Kokaltásh returned from his pilgrimage and repaired to court, and next year on prince Murád going to the Dakhan (Deccan), Súrajsingh was appointed his deputy. In 1594–95 Bahádur, son of the late Muzaffar Sháh III, excited a rebellion, but was defeated by Súrajsingh.

=== Mírza Âzíz Kokaltásh, Ninth Viceroy, 1600–1606 ===
In 1600, owing to the death of prince Murád, Mírza Âzíz Kokaltásh was a third time appointed viceroy of Gujarát, and he sent Shams-ud-dín Husain as his deputy to Áhmedábád. Further changes were made in 1602 when Mírza Âzíz sent his eldest son Shádmán as deputy; his second son Khurram as governor of Junagaḍh; and Sayad Báyazíd as minister. Khurram was afterwards relieved of the charge of Sorath and Junagaḍh by his brother Abdulláh.

Jehangir succeeded Akbar to the Mughal throne in 1605 when he died.

== List of Viceroys under Akbar (1573–1605) ==
- Mírza Âziz Kokaltásh, First Viceroy, 1573–1575
- Mírza Khán (later Mírza Abdúr-Rahím Khán (Khán Khánán)), Second Viceroy, 1575–1577
- Shaháb-ud-dín, Third Viceroy, 1577–1583
- Ítimád Khán Gujaráti, Fourth Viceroy, 1583–1584
- Mírza Abdúr-Rahím Khán (Khán Khánán), Fifth Viceroy, 1583–1587 (second time)
- Ismáíl Kuli Khán, Sixth Viceroy, 1587–1588
- Mírza Âziz Kokaltásh, Seventh Viceroy, 1588–1592 (second time)
- Shahzádá Murad Mirza, Eighth Viceroy, 1592–1600
- Mírza Âzíz Kokaltásh, Ninth Viceroy, 1600–1606 (third time)
