= Hazira Maqbara =

Hazira
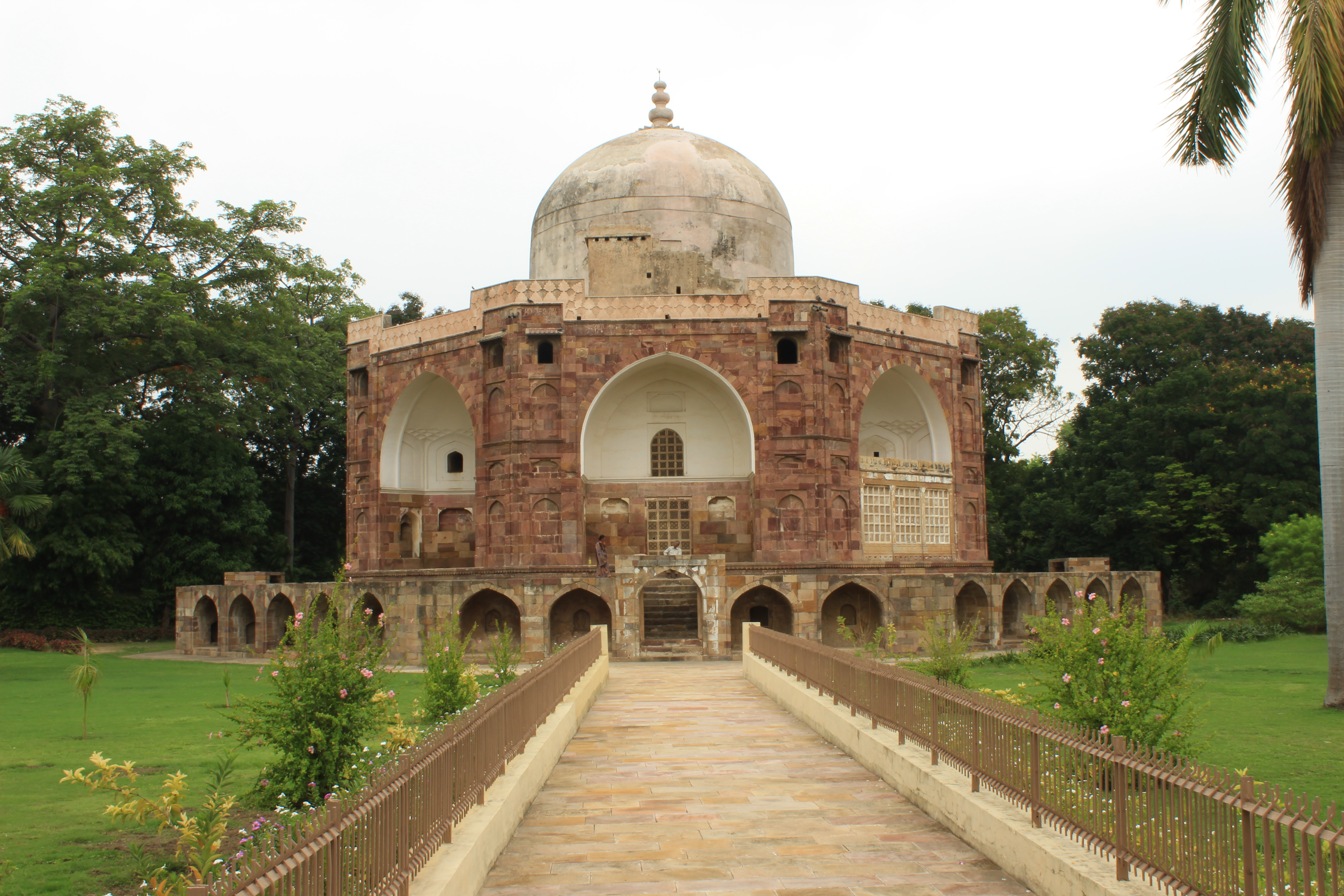
- Front view of Hazira

- Location within Gujarat
- 22.277879°N 73.206952°E
- Location: Vadodara, Gujarat, India

History
- Built: 1586

Site notes
- Architectural style: Mughal architecture

The mausoleum known as Hazira at Vadodara, Gujarat, India; contains the tombs of Qutb-ud-din Muhammad Khan who was the tutor of Salim, son and successor of Akbar, and also that of his son Naurang Khan who held important offices in Gujarat under Akbar. Qutb-ud-din was uncle of Mirza Aziz Koka, a foster brother of Akbar and the Governor of Gujarat thrice in between 1573 AD to 1583 AD. He was killed in 1583 by Muzaffar Shah III, the last sultan of Gujarat Sultanate.

Built on high octagonal platform with smaller gates on the cardinal directions and five arches on each side. It is in the style of Mughal tombs at Delhi. The real grave is in an underground chamber and the false grave in the tomb chamber. The Quranic texts in Arabic are carved, inside tomb chamber, on lintels, arches and also above Jali work on eastern side walls. The extant parapet wall on the roof terrace is embellished with Merlon designs in brick red color evident from the traces. The lower portion of cylindrical dome surrounding the tomb was covered with thick plaster of brick red color.

The mausoleum has a double dome and seems to have been a garden tomb and vav or stepwell to its across west the modern road was perhaps used for supplying the water to the garden.

== Gallery ==
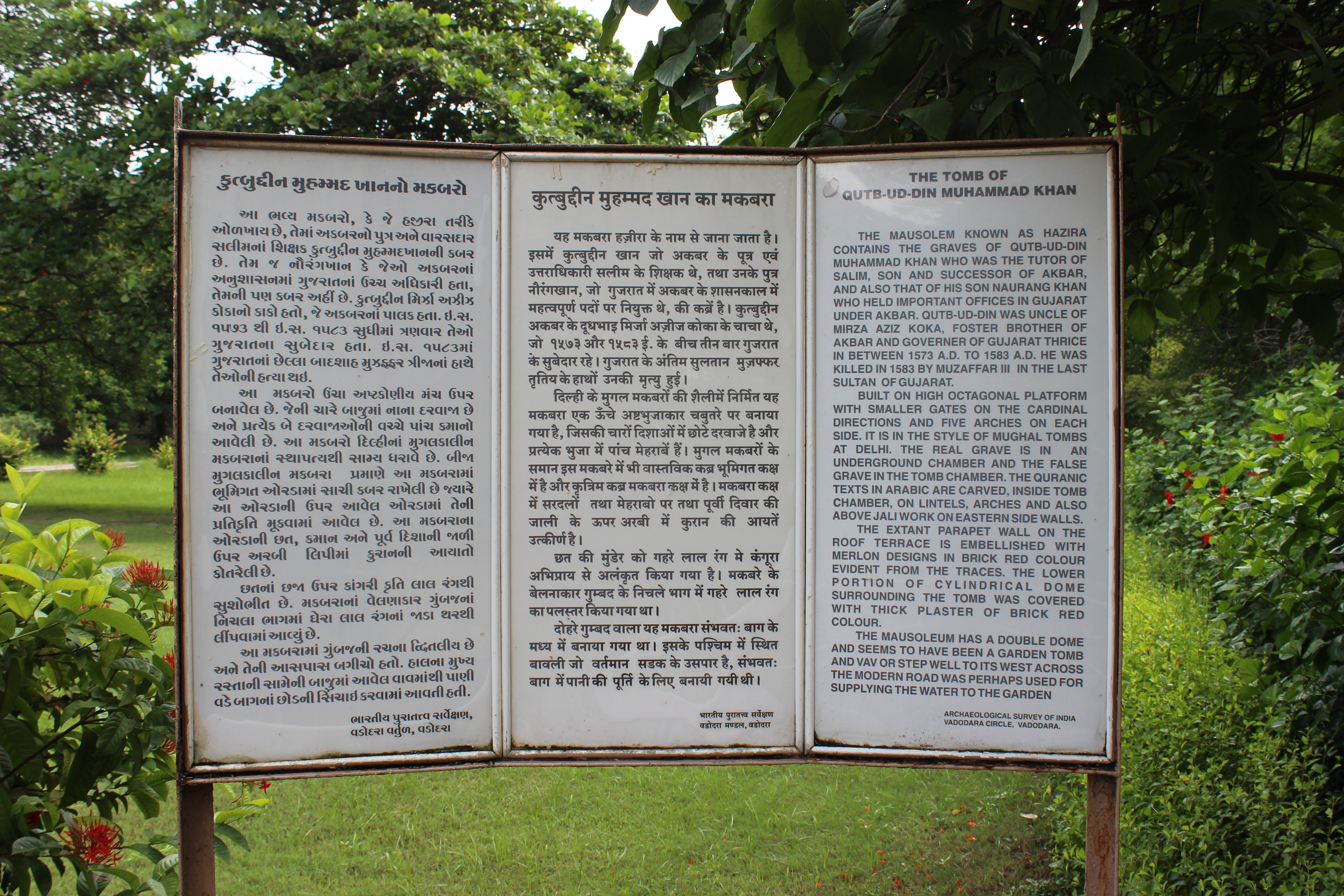
The plaque at the entrance of the tomb

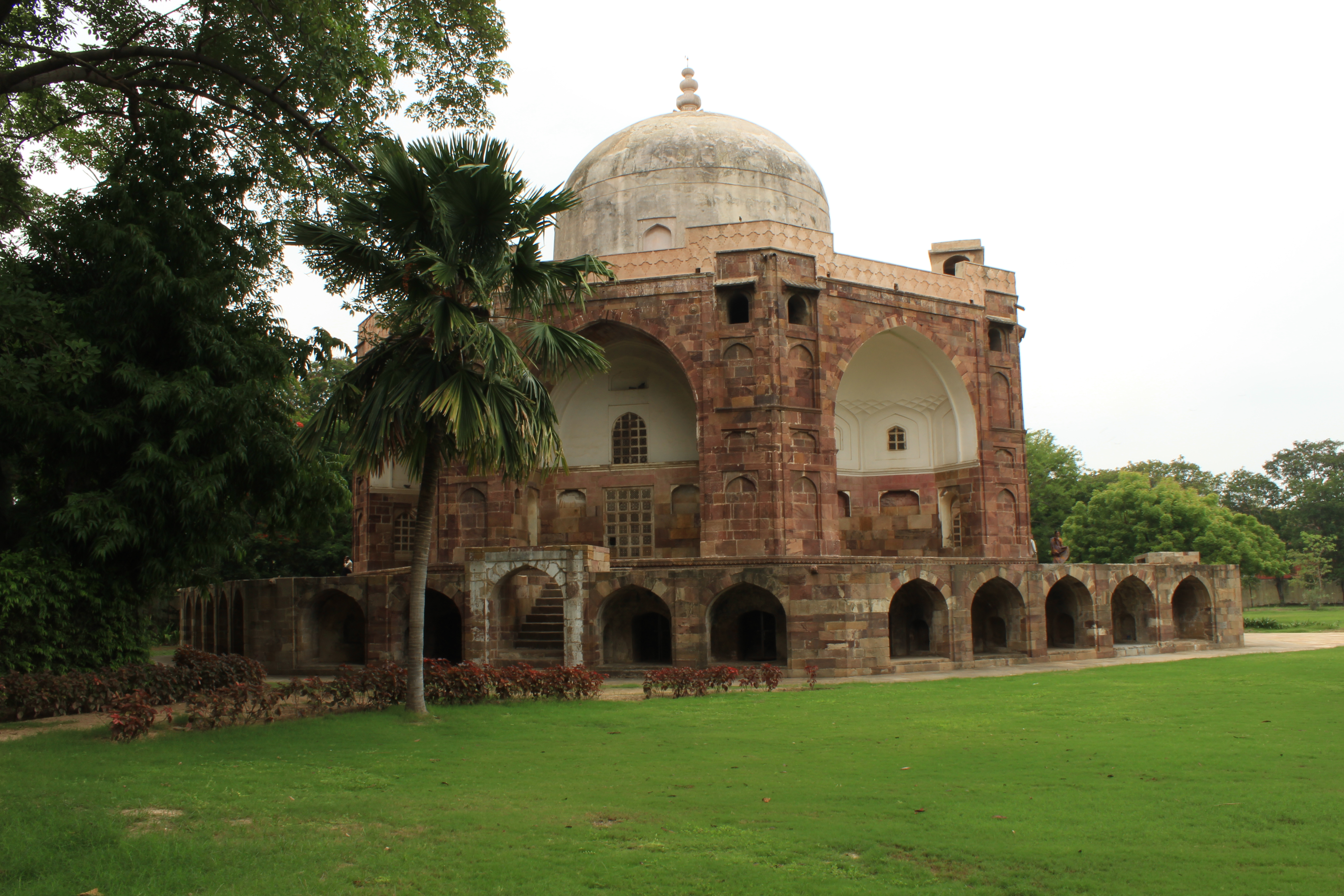
Hazira from side

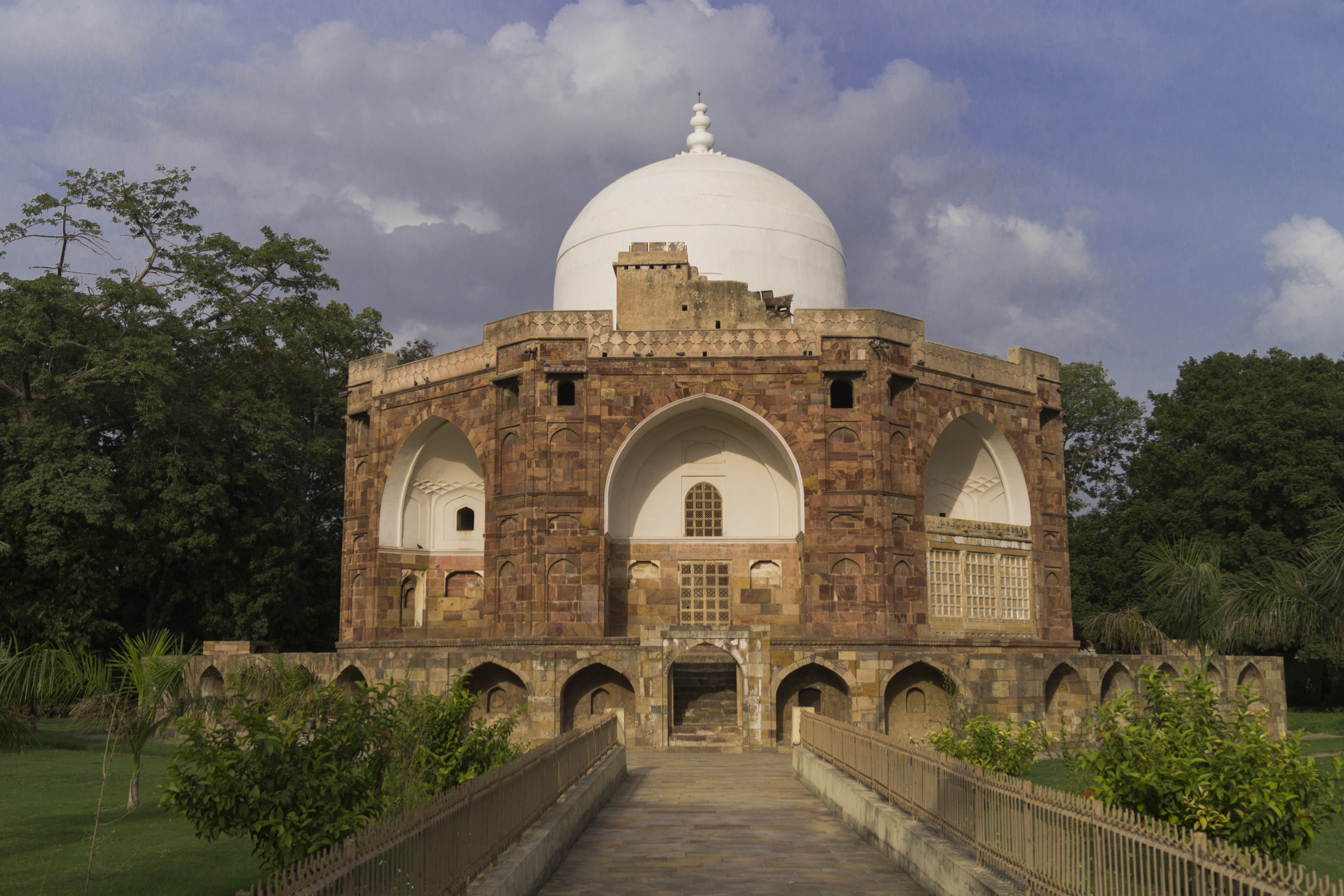
Hazira restored
