= Moti Bhalsan =

Village in Gujarat, India

- Location within Gujarat Location within India
- Coordinates: 22.3190229°N 70.1671624°E
- Country: India
- State: Gujarat
- District: Jamnagar district
- Moti Bhalsan (Bholasan): 1313 savant

Government

Area
  - Total: 1 km^{2} (0.39 sq mi)

Population
  - Total: 1,750
  - Density: 1,800/km^{2} (4,500/sq mi)
- PIN: 361012

Moti Bhalsan (Bholasan) is a village southeast of the Jamnagar district of Gujarat, India. It is roughly 22 kilometres (14 mi) from Jamnagar and roughly 320 kilometres (200 mi) from the State capital of Gujarat.

Jamnagar, Kalavad, Khambhalia, and Salaya are nearby cities. The Pin code for Moti Bhalsan is 361012 and its postal head office is in Chela. It is closest to the Gulf of Kutch near the Arabian Sea. It is spread over an area of roughly 4000 acres of land. It has Six Hindu temples: Nilakanth Mahadev 700 year old, Fuleshvar Mahadev, Bhimnath Mahadev, Meramdada Mandir, Shree Raiya Bapa Temple, Shri Ramdevpir Nu Madh, and Jai Gel Mataji Temple. There is one Jain temple called Jain Derasar, which was built from the Nilkanth Mahadev temple 700-year-old Moti Bhalsan old name called Bholasan.

== History ==
Moti Bhalsan was founded by Rana Parbatji Sodha in 1500 CE. It's the birthplace of Togaji Sodha who was famous for being crucial in helping win several battles. He was involved in winning the Battle of Bhuchar Mori near Jamnagar in 1591 CE. He also played a role in winning the battle of 'Mithoi' near Jamnagar in 1606 CE. Allegedly, there was a really difficult mission his commanders in the Jam Rawal army needed volunteers for. As a way of motivating the troops into volunteering, the commanders threatened to kill wholesome Brahman men until they could find a suitable volunteer. Supposedly, after three rounds of this "motivation", Togaji Sodha and three others volunteered. They approached the opposing army as friendly strangers and eventually disabled 140 big guns before getting caught. He suffered 84 wounds to his body but survived. Regardless of what he sabotaged of the opposing army's, he was universally reported as a war hero.
