= Muzaffar Shah III =

Sultan of Gujarat from 1561 to 1573 and from 1583 to 1584

- Portrait of Muzaffar Shah III

14th Sultan of Gujarat
- First reign: 1561 – 1573 (nominal)
- Predecessor: Ahmad Shah III
- Successor: Akbar; Mirza Aziz Koka, Governor of Gujarat Subah, Mughal Empire
- Second reign: 1583 – January 1584
- Died: 24 December 1592; Dhrol, Gujarat, India
Names
- Shams-ud-Din Muzaffar Shah III
- Dynasty: Muzaffarid House
- Religion: Islam

Shams-ud-Din Muzaffar Shah III was the last sultan of the Muzaffarid dynasty who nominally reigned over the Gujarat Sultanate, a late medieval kingdom in India from 1561 to 1573 though true powers were exerted by his nobles. Mughal Emperor Akbar annexed Gujarat into his empire in 1573. Muzaffar Shah III was taken prisoner to Agra. In 1583, he escaped from the prison and with the help of the nobles succeeded to regain the throne for a short period before being defeated by Akbar's general Abdul Rahim Khan-I-Khana in January 1584. He fled and finally took asylum under Jam Sataji of Nawanagar State. The Battle of Bhuchar Mori was fought between the Mughal forces led by Mirza Aziz Koka and the combined Kathiawar forces in 1591 to protect him. He finally committed suicide in 1592 when he was surrendered to the Mughal by the ruler of Cutch State.

== Reign ==
After assassination of Ahmad Shah III, his noble Ítimád Khán raised a youth to the throne, whom he styled Muzaffar Shah III, and who, he asserted, was a posthumous son of Mahmúd Sháh. According to Abul Fazl (Akbarnáma, III. 404; Elliot, V. 730) Muzaffar was a base-born boy of the name of Nathu. Ítimád Khán then marched towards Pátan to take revenge on the Fauládis for their attack on Fateh Khán Balúch before. The nobles unwilling to crush the Fauládis, fearing lest their turn might come next, entered into secret correspondence with them, and withdrew when battle was joined. The nobles were now independent in their respective jágirs, in which according to the Tabakát-i-Akbari they allowed no interference though still owning nominal allegiance to the throne. Ítimád Khán, forced to return unsuccessful to Ahmedabad, with a view of again attacking the Fauládis, summoned Tátár Khán Ghori from Junagadh. The nobles remained aloof, and even Tátár Khán Ghori made excuses, which so exasperated Ítimád Khán that he sought to slay him. Tátár Khán escaped to Sorath, and there openly sided with the Fauládis. Sayad Mírán also left Áhmedábád for his estate at Dholka, and joining Tátár Khán at Ranpur they both went over to the Fauládis at Pátan. Meanwhile, Ítimád Khán, again collecting an army, marched once more towards Pátan. He was met by the Fauládis near the village of Jotana, about thirty miles south of Pátan, where he was defeated and compelled to return to Áhmedábád. Sayad Mírán now intervened and made peace. Ítimád Khán still thirsting for revenge on the Fauládis, invited Changíz Khán, son of Imád-ul-Mulk Rúmi, to the capital, and by courteous treatment induced him to join in another expedition against the Fauládis. Like the other nobles Changíz Khán was lukewarm; and as Músa Khán Fauládi died while Ítimád Khán was marching on Pátan, Changíz Khán assigned this as a reason for not proceeding further, averring that it was not fit to war with people in misfortune. Ítimád Khán perforce returned to Áhmedábád.

Though Ítimád Khán had disgusted the nobles, both by causing the assassination of Áhmed Sháh and by his enmity with the Fauládis, as he had charge of Muzaffar Sháh and possession of the capital, the government of the country was in his hands. At this time the Mírzás, who were the sons of Sultán Hussain of Khurásán, quarrelling with Jalál-ul-dín Muhammad Akbar, entered Gujarát, and joined Changíz Khán. Changíz Khán now proposed to Sher Khán Fauládi that they should expel Ítimád Khán and divide Gujarát between them, the capital and the country south of the Sábarmati falling to the share of Changíz Khán, and that to the north to Sher Khán Fauládi. Sher Khán agreed, and Changíz Khán joining him they marched on Áhmedábád. Sayad Mirán induced Sher Khán to stay in Kadi. But Changíz Khán refused to listen to him, and a battle was fought between him, Ítimád Khán, and the Sayad on the right bank of the Khari river about eight miles south of Áhmedábád. Ítimád Khán was defeated, and fled with the king to Modasa, while Changíz Khán took possession of the capital. Sher Khán Fauládi now advanced to the Sábarmati, and, after dividing the province as had been agreed, Sher Khán retired to Kadi. Ítimád Khán entreated Mírán Muhammad Sháh, king of Khandesh, to march to his aid, and Changíz Khán invited Ítimád Khán to return. He came to Mehmudábád, where hearing that Muhammad Sháh had sustained a defeat and retired to his own country, he took Muzaffar Sháh with him and returned through Modása to Dungarpur. Changíz Khán remained in Áhmedábád, and Sher Khán withdrew to Kadi. After this success all the chief nobles of Gujarát, including the Habshis, joined Changíz Khán, who was now at the zenith of his power, and began to think of subduing Sher Khán Fauládi, who on his part was anxious and fearful.

At this time Bijli Khán a Habshi eunuch who was offended with Changíz Khán, because he had resumed the grant of Khambhat, persuaded Álíf Khán and Jhujhár Khán Habshi that Changíz Khán had determined to kill them. The Habshi Kháns, resolving to be beforehand, invited Changíz Khán, with whom they were intimate, to play a game of chaugán or polo. Changíz agreed and when near the Farhat-ul-Mulk mosque, between the Bhadra Fort and the Three Gates, Álíf Khán, after making Jhujhár Khán a signal, attracted Changíz Khán's notice to the horse on which he was riding saying it was the best of the last batch imported from the Persian Gulf. As Changíz Khán turned to look at the horse, Jhujhár Khán cut him down. The Habshis now plundered Changíz Khán's house, while the Mírzás, mounting, went south and took possession of Bharuch, Baroda (now Vadodara), and Champaner. Sher Khán advanced from Kadi, and ordered the Habshis to hand him over Áhmedábád. While treating with him the Habshis secretly summoned Ítimád Khán, who, returning with Muzaffar Sháh, entered the city. It was arranged that Ítimád Khán should take the place of Changíz Khán, and that the division of Gujarát between Changíz Khán and Sher Khán should be maintained. Ítimád Khán found the Habshis so domineering that he withdrew from public affairs. Afterwards Álaf Khán and Jhujhár Khán, quarrelling over the division of Changíz Khán's property, Álaf Khán left Áhmedábád and joined Sher Khán, who, advancing from Kadi, laid siege to Áhmedábád. Ítimád Khán now sought aid from the Mírzás, and Mírza Ibráhím Husain marched from Bharuch and harassed Sher Khán's army with his Mughal archers.

=== Mughal conquest of Gujarat ===
At the same time Ítimád Khán went for help to the emperor Akbar, who, glad of any pretext for driving the Mírzás from their place of refuge in Gujarát, was not slow in availing himself of Ítimád Khán's proposal. Early in July 1572 he started for Áhmedábád.

To the nobles thus fighting among themselves, news was brought that the emperor Akbar was at Disa. Ibráhím Husain Mírza returned to Bharuch and the army of the Fauládis dispersed. From Dísa the imperial troops advanced to Pátan and thence to Jotána, thirty miles south of Pátan. Sultán Muzaffar Shah III, who had separated from the Fauládis, fell into the hands of the emperor, who granted him his life but placed him under charge of one of his nobles named Karam Áli. When the imperial army reached Kadi, Ítimád Khán, Ikhtiyár Khán, Álaf Khán, and Jhujhár Khán met Akbar and Sayad Hámid also was honoured with an audience at Hájipur. The emperor imprisoned Álaf Khán and Jhujhár Khán Habshi and encouraged the other Gujarát nobles. Ikhtiyár-ul-Mulk now fled to Lunawada, and the emperor, fearing that others of the Gujarát nobles might follow his example, sent Ítimád Khán to Khambhat and placed him under the charge of Shahbáz Khán Kambo. From Áhmedábád Akbar advanced to Khambhat. At this time Ibráhím Mírza held Baroda, Muhammad Husain Mírza held Surat, and Sháh Mírza held Chámpáner. On leaving Khambaht to expel the Mírzas, Akbar appointed Mírza Âzíz Kokaltásh his first viceroy of Gujarát. At Baroda Akbar heard that Ibráhím Mírza had treacherously killed Rustam Khán Rúmi, who was Changíz Khán's governor of Bharuch. The emperor recalled the detachment he had sent against Surat, and overtaking the Mírza at Sarnál or Thásra on the right bank of the Mahi River about twenty-three miles north-east of Nadiad, after a bloody conflict routed him. The Mírza fled by Ahmednagar to Sirohi, and Akbar rejoined his camp at Baroda. The emperor now sent a force under Sháh Kuli Khán to invest the fort of Surat, and following in person pitched his camp at Gopi Talav, a suburb of that city. After an obstinate defence of one month and seventeen days, the garrison under Hamzabán, a slave of Humáyún's who had joined the Mírzás, surrendered. Hamzabán was in treaty with the Portuguese. Under his invitation a large party of Portuguese came to Surat during the siege, but seeing the strength of the imperial army, represented themselves as ambassadors and besought the honour of an interview. While at Surat the emperor received from Bihár or Vihárji the Rája of Baglan, Sharfuddín Husain Mírza whom the Rája had captured. After the capture of Surat, the emperor ordered the great Sulaimáni cannon which had been brought by the Turks with the view of destroying the Portuguese forts and left by them in Surat, to be taken to Ágra. Surat was placed in the charge of Kalíj Khán. The emperor now advanced to Áhmedábád, where the mother of Changíz Khán came and demanded justice on Jhujhár Khán for having wantonly slain her son. As her complaint was just, the emperor ordered Jhujhár Khán to be thrown under the feet of an elephant. Muhammad Khán, son of Sher Khán Fauládi, who had fled to the Idar hills, now returned and took the city of Pátan, besieging the imperial governor, Sayad Áhmed Khán Bárha, in the citadel. At this time Mírza Muhammad Husain was at Ranpur near Dhandhuka. When Sher Khán Fauládi, who had taken refuge in Sorath, heard of Muhammad Khán's return to Pátan, he met Mírza Muhammad Husain, and uniting their forces they joined Muhammad Khán at Pátan. The viceroy Mírza Âzíz Kokaltásh with other nobles marched against them, and after a hard-fought battle, in which several of the imperial nobles were slain, Mírza Âzíz Kokaltásh was victorious. Sher Khán again took refuge in Sorath, and his son fled for safety to the Ídar hills, while the Mírza withdrew to the Khándesh frontier. As the conquest of Gujarát was completed in 1573, Akbar returned to Agra with Muzaffar Shah III as a captive.

== Second reign ==
Akbar's governors managed the state from 1573 to 1583 with frequent rebellions and disturbances from 1573 to 1583. Akbar jailed Muzaffar in Agra Fort but he escaped back to Gujarat in 1583. Muzaffar remained for some time in the Rajpipla, and thence came to one Lúna or Lúmbha Káthi, at the village of Khíri in the district of Sardhár in Sorath.

Ítimád Khán Gujaráti was appointed viceroy by Akbar soon in 1583 in place of Shaháb-ud-dín. At this time a party of 700 or 800 Mughals, called Wazír Khánis, separating from Shaháb-ud-dín, remained behind in hope of being entertained by the new viceroy. As Ítimád Khán declared that he was unable to take them into his service, they went off in a body and joined Muzaffar at Khíri, and he with them and three or four thousand Káthi horse marched at once on Áhmedábád. On hearing this Ítimád Khán, leaving his son Sher Khán in Áhmedábád, followed Shaháb-ud-dín to Kadi, and entreated him to return. Shaháb-ud-dín at first affected indifference telling Ítimád that as he had given over charge he had no more interest in the province. After two days he consented to return if Ítimád stated in writing that the country was on the verge of being lost and that Ítimád being unable to hold it was obliged to relinquish charge to Shaháb-ud-dín. Ítimád Khán made the required statement and Shaháb-ud-dín returned with him.

Muzaffar captures Áhmedábád, 1583.

Meanwhile, Muzaffar Sháh reached Áhmedábád, which was weakly defended, and in 1583, after a brief struggle, took possession of the city. While the siege of Áhmedábád was in progress Shaháb-ud-dín and Ítimád Khán were returning, and were within a few miles of the city, when news of its capture reached them. They continued their advance, but had barely arrived at Áhmedábád when Muzaffar Sháh totally defeated them taking all their baggage. Seeing the issue of the fight, most of their army went over to Muzaffar Sháh, and the viceroy and Shaháb-ud-dín with a few men fled to Pátan. Kutb-ud-dín Muhammad Khán Atkah, one of the imperial commanders, who was on the Khándesh frontier, now advanced by forced marches to Baroda. Muzaffar marched against him with a large army, recently strengthened by the union of the army of Sayad Daulát ruler of Khambhat. Kutb-ud-dín threw himself into Baroda, and, in spite of the treachery of his troops, defended the city for some time. At last, on Muzaffar's assurance that his life should be spared Kutb-ud-dín repaired to the enemies' camp to treat for peace. On his arrival he was treated with respect, but next day was treacherously put to death. The fort of Bharuch was also at this time traitorously surrendered to Muzaffar by the slaves of the mother of Naurang Khán, fief-holder of the district.

Battle of Fatehwadi

On learning of the Gujarát insurrection the emperor, at the close of 1583, conferred the government of the province on Mírza Abdúr-Rahím Khán, son of Behrám Khán, who had formerly 1575) acted as viceroy. Muzaffar, who was still at Broach, hearing of the advance of the new viceroy with a large army, returned rapidly to Áhmedábád, and in 1584 fought a pitched battle with Mírza Abdúr-Rahím Khán between Sarkhej and Sháh Bhíkan's tomb. In this engagement Muzaffar was entirely defeated, and fled to Khambhat pursued by Mírza Abdúr-Rahím Khán. Muzaffar now hearing that Mírza Abdúr-Rahím Khán had been joined by Naurang Khán and other nobles with the imperial army from Málwa, quitted Khambhat, and made for his old place of shelter in Rájpípla.

Finding no rest in Rájpípla, after fighting and losing another battle in the Rájpípla hills, he fled first to Pátan and then to Ídar, and afterwards again repaired to Lúmbha Káthi in Khiri. In reward for these two victories, the emperor bestowed on Mírza Abdúr-Rahím Khán the title of Khán Khánán. Bharuch now submitted, and Muzaffar sought shelter with Amín Khán Ghori at Junagadh, by whom he was allotted the town of Gondal as a residence. Muzaffar made one more attempt to establish his power. He advanced to Morbi, and thence made a raid on Radhanpur and plundered that town, but was soon compelled to return to Kathiawad and seek safety in flight. Amín Khán, seeing that his cause was hopeless, on pretence of aiding him, induced Muzaffar to give him some money, two lakh Mahmudi. When he had obtained the money, on one pretext or another, Amín Khán withheld the promised aid.

The Khán Khánán now marched an army into Sorath against Muzaffar. The Jám of Navánagar and Amín Khán sent their envoys to meet the viceroy, declaring that they had not sheltered Muzaffar, and that he was leading an outlaw's life, entirely unaided by them. The viceroy agreed not to molest them, on condition that they withheld aid and shelter from Muzaffar, and himself marched against him. When he reached Upleta, about fifteen miles north-west of the fortress of Junágaḍh, the viceroy heard that Muzaffar had sought shelter in the Barda hills in the south-west corner of the peninsula. Advancing to the hills, he halted his main force outside of the rough country and sent skirmishing parties to examine the hills. Muzaffar had already passed through Navánagar and across Gujarát to Danta in the Mahi Kántha. Here he was once more defeated by the Prantij garrison, and a third time took refuge in Rájpípla. The viceroy now marched on Navánagar to punish the Jám. The Jám sent in his submission, and the viceroy taking from him, by way of fine, an elephant and some valuable horses, returned to Áhmedábád. He next sent a detachment against Ghazni Khán of Jalore who had favoured Muzaffar. Ghazni Khán submitted, and no further steps were taken against him.

Battle of Bhuchar Mori

In 1587, the Khán Khánán was replaced by Ismáíl Kuli Khán as a governor. Ismáíl's government lasted only for a few months, when he was superseded by Mírza Âziz Kokaltásh, who was a second time appointed viceroy. In 1591, Muzaffar again returned to Sorath. The viceroy, hearing that he had been joined by the Jám of Nawanagar State, the Cutch State chief, and Daulat Khán Ghori the son of Amín Khán, marched with a large army towards Sorath, and, halting at Viramgam, sent forward a detachment under Naurang Khán, Sayad Kásim, and other officers. Advancing as far as Morbi, Naurang Khán entered into negotiations with the Jám, who, however, refused to accede to the demands of the imperial commander. On this the viceroy joined Naurang Khán with the bulk of his army, and after a short delay marched on Nawánagar. On his way, a plateau called Bhuchar Mori at the village of Dhrol near Nawánagar, Muzaffar and the Jám opposed him, and an obstinate battle in which the imperialists were nearly worsted, ended in Muzaffar's defeat. The son and minister of the Jám were slain, and Muzaffar, the Jám, and Daulat Khán who was wounded, fled to the fortress of Junágaḍh. The viceroy now advanced and plundered Nawánagar, and remaining there sent Naurang Khán, Sayad Kásím, and Gújar Khán against Junágaḍh. The day the army arrived before the fortress Daulat Khán died of his wounds. Still the fortress held out, and though the viceroy joined them the siege made little progress as the imperial troops were in great straits for grain. The viceroy returned to Áhmedábád, and after seven or eight months again marched against Junágaḍh. The Jám, who was still a fugitive, sent envoys and promised to aid the viceroy if his country were restored to him. The viceroy assented on condition that, during the operations against Junágaḍh, the Jám should furnish his army with grain. The Jám agreed to provide grain, and after a siege of three months the garrison surrendered.

== Last days ==
News was next received that Muzaffar had taken refuge at Dwarka (also known as Jagat). The viceroy at once sent Naurang Khán and others with an army in pursuit. On reaching Jagat it was found that Muzaffar had already left for a village owned by a Rájput named Sewa Wádhel. Without halting Naurang Khán started in pursuit, nearly surprising Muzaffar, who escaping on horseback with a few followers, crossed to Cutch (now Kachchh). Sewa Wádhel covering Muzaffar's retreat was surprised before he could put to sea and fought gallantly with the imperial forces till he was slain. Naurang Khán then came to Arámra, a village belonging to Singrám Wádhel, Rája of Dwarka, and after frustrating a scheme devised by that chief to entrap a body of the troops on board ship under pretence of pursuing Muzaffar's family, led his men back to Junágaḍh. The viceroy, hearing in what direction Muzaffar had fled, marched to Morbi, where the Jám of Navánagar came and paid his respects. At the same time the Cutch chief, who is called Rao Bháramalji I, sent a message that if the viceroy would refrain from invading his country and would give him his ancestral district of Morbi and supply him with a detachment of troops, he would point out where Muzaffar was concealed. The Khán-i-Ázam agreed to these terms and the chief captured Muzaffar and handed him to the force sent to secure him.

The detachment, strictly guarding the prisoner, were marching rapidly towards Morbi, when, on reaching Dhrol, about thirty miles east of Nawanagar (now Jamnagar), under pretence of obeying a call of nature, Muzaffar withdrew and cut his throat with a knife, so that he died. This happened in 1592. The viceroy sent Muzaffar's head to the court of Akbar.
