= A. H. Jami =

Indian cartoonist (1942–2020)

- Born: Avad bin Hassan Jami; 2 December 1942 Dhrol, British India
- Died: 11 July 2020 (aged 77) Jamnagar, Gujarat, India
- Area: Cartoonist
- Pseudonym: Tikadam

Avad bin Hassan Jami (2 December 1942 – 11 July 2020) was an Indian cartoonist from Gujarat. He had a career spanning 45 years during which he worked with several publications.

== Biography ==
Jami was born on 2 December 1942 in Dhrol. He was a son of Hasan Bagin Ahmad Jami, an Arab official serving in Morbi State. He studied D. T. C. and started working as a drawing teacher in Dhrol in 1962. He was an art teacher in Kendriya Vidyalaya, Jamnagar from 1968 to 2001 and in Kendriya Vidyalaya, Rajkot from 2001 to 2003. After retirement, he became a full time cartoonist.

He worked with several publications. He started publishing cartoons in Rangtarang magazine when he was 19. His cartoons were later published in various Gujarati publications such as G, Chakchar, Beej, Anjali and Chandani as well as in Hindi publications such as Dharmayug, Madhuri and Parag. He had also worked with Phoolchhab, Divya Bhaskar, Sandesh, Jaihind and Patidar Saurabh. He worked with Abhiyan, a Gujarati magazine, for two decades and published cartoons under pseudonym Tikadam.

He died on 11 July 2020 at G. G. Hospital in Jamnagar, Gujarat, India.

== Recognition ==
Jami was awarded Helpful Citizens' Award in 1993. He was felicitated as the Best Cartoonist by the Government of Gujarat in 1994–95.
