= Battle of Bhuchar Mori =

1591 battle between Mughal Empire and Kathiawar forces

- Part of Mughal conquest of Gujarat
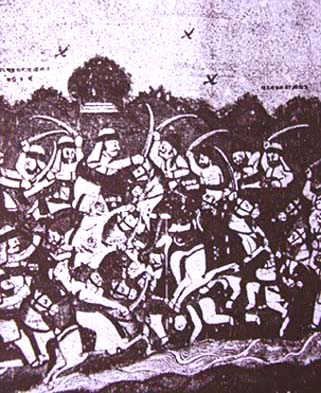
- Sketch from the Yaduvanshprakash by Mavdanji Ratnu, 1934
Date	July 1591
Location	Bhuchar Mori plateau near Dhrol State (now near Dhrol, Jamnagar district, Gujarat, India) 22.582°N 70.400°E
Result	Mughal victory: Dissolution of Gujarat Sultanate
Territorial changes	Gujarat captured by Mughals

Belligerents
Mughal Empire; Junagadh State	Nawanagar State; Gujarat Sultanate; Muli State

Commanders and leaders
Mirza Aziz Koka; Daulat Khan Ghori	Muzaffar Shah III; Jam Sataji; Jam Ajaji †; Jasa Vajir †; Rao Bharmalji I Sanganji Vadher; Vasaji Parmar

Strength
80,000–90,000	17,000–21,000; 84 elephants

Casualties and losses
10,000–20,000 soldiers; 500 injured	2,000 soldiers; 500 horses disabled; 1,500 pilgrim sadhus
- The numbers are derived from agreement of various sources.
- Location of battle in Gujarat Bhuchar Mori (India)

The Battle of Bhuchar Mori, also known as Battle of Dhrol, was fought between the army of Kathiawar led by Nawanagar State and the Mughal army at Bhuchar Mori plateau near Dhrol, Saurashtra (now in Jamnagar district, Gujarat, India). It was meant to protect Muzaffar Shah III, the last Sultan of Gujarat Sultanate who had taken asylum under Jam Sataji of Nawanagar after his escape from the Mughal emperor Akbar. It was fought in July 1591 (Vikram Samvat 1648). The Kathiawar army included the armies of Junagadh who betrayed Nawanagar and joined the Mughal army at last. The battle led to a large number of casualties on both sides. The battle resulted in the victory of the Mughal army.

It is considered the largest battle in the history of Saurashtra. It is often dubbed as the Panipat of Saurashtra.

== Background ==
Muzaffar Shah III, the Sultan of Gujarat Sultanate, was a titular king and the state was managed by various nobles in divisions who were constantly fighting each other. Muzaffar besieged Ahmedabad with the help of other nobles. Itimad Khan, the noble managing Ahmedabad, invited Mughal emperor Akbar to conquer the state. He entered Ahmedabad without a battle on 18 November 1572. Muzaffar was captured hiding in a grain field. Akbar captured the state gradually by 1573 AD (Vikram Samvat 1629). His governors managed the state from 1573 to 1583 with frequent rebellions and disturbances.

Akbar jailed Muzaffar Shah in Agra but he escaped to Gujarat in 1583 AD (Vikram Samvat 1639). After a short stay at Rajpipla, he crossed over to Kathiawar where he was joined by 700 soldiers. He was aided by Loma khuman he raised 5000 cavalry . He plundered villages near Ahmedabad and later captured Ahmedabad and eventually Vadodara and Bharuch. Muzaffar was defeated at Ahmedabad by new Mughal governor Mirza Khan on 26 January 1584 AD. Muzaffar fled to Mahemdabad and later to Khambhat. As Mirza Khan advanced towards Khambhat in February 1584, he moved to Vadodara where again both forces clashed and Muzaffar was defeated. He fled to mountains. Later when Bharuch was captured by the Mughal, he fled from place to place; first to Idar and later to Kathiawar. As nobody gave him asylum, Jam Sataji of Nawanagar State agreed and hid him in Barda Hills.

Akbar transferred his foster brother Mirza Aziz Koka from Malwa to Gujarat in 1588-89 AD (Hijri year 997) in place of Mirza Khan to capture Muzaffar. The large army was stationed at Viramgam. He sent Navroz Khan and Saiyad Kasim with troops to find him to Morbi. Mirza Aziz Koka corresponded with Jam Sataji and asked to surrender but he declined Jam Sataji harassed the Mughal army by cutting their supplies, by killing stragglers, and carrying off horses and elephants whenever he could.

== Battle ==
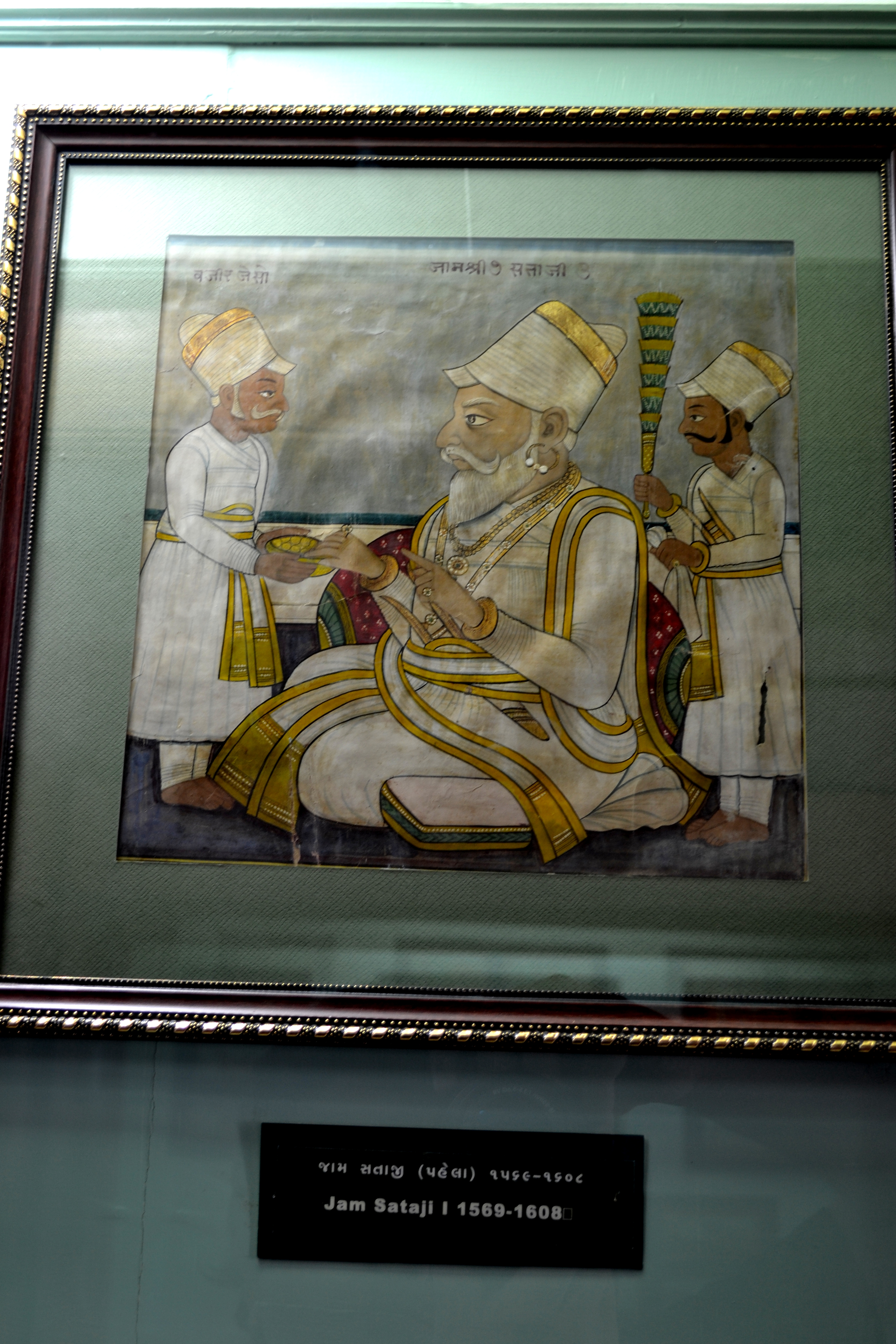
Jam Sataji

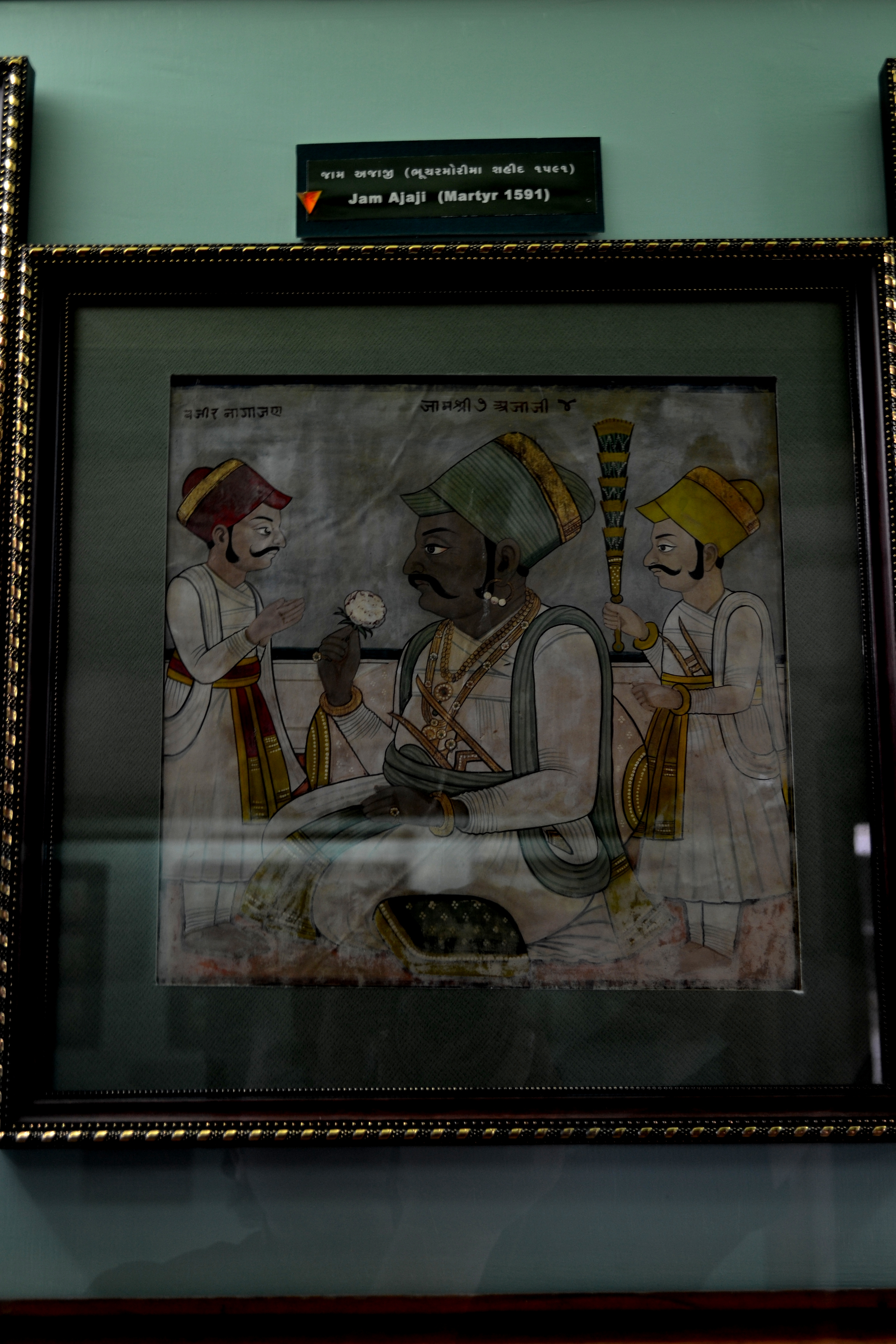
Jam Ajaji who died in battle

Mirza Aziz Koka assembled his army near Dhrol which included 8,900 to 9,000 warriors. The army included the Roman, Arab, Russian, Turk, Firkani, Habasi, Mirkani, Mukrani, Sindhi, and soldiers from Kandhar, Kabul, Khorasan, and Iran. (Note: Various sources suggest the strength of troops from 8900 to 9000. Akbarnama stated less than 10000 warriors.)

The Kathiawar force was stationed near Dhrol which had 17,000 to 21,000 warriors. The Nawanagar forces included Hapa, Kana, Balach, Jiya, Kabar, Dal, Mod, and Rao clans of Jadeja, Sodha, Tumbel, Barhath, Gadhvi and other clans of Cāraṇas, Dhundhan, Dhaman, Sumra, Sindhi and Rajgor. According to regional Sodha genealogical traditions, warriors associated with Moti Bhalsan and neighbouring Sodha settlements of the Halar region also joined the forces of Nawanagar.

The forces of Jam Sataji was joined by Nawab Dolatkhan Ghori and Jagirdar Ra Khengar of Junagadh State and the warriors sent by Rao Bharmalji I of Cutch State. Sanganji Vadher of Okha and Vasaji Parmar of Muli State joined with their army. Maheraman Ajani of Bhadresar, Kutch joined Nawanagar with his fourteen sons. The Jamat of naked Atit Sadhus, returning from pilgrimage Dwarka and going to Hinglaj Devi, also joined them. The army also had a large number of cannons, 84 elephants, cavalry, and camels. (Note: Numbers of Kathiawar force does note correspond to other sources. 17000 of Nawanagar, 15000 of Junagadh, 5000 of Kutch and 1500 Atit Sadhus are stated in some sources but seems exaggerated. Other old sources place the Kathiawar forces ranging from 17000-21000 warriors. Akbarnama stated that it was more than 30000 but it seems that the forces reduced as Junagadh left.) (Note: It is stated in Akbarnama that Muzaffar left battlefield without fighting but no other source mention that he participated in the battle.)

When the Mughal army reached Bhuchar Mori, Jam attacked with the auxiliary forces of Kutch. There were two night raids on the Mughal forces too and the battle was delayed two days due to rain. Several skirmishes were fought, in each of which the Kathiawar army was victorious. Due to the season of rain, the battlefield was not suitable and the strategy of Jam Sataji won frequently. After a period of three months, Mirza Aziz Koka started peace talks with mediation of Chandrasinh of Halvad. He had agreed to pay two lakh to Jam Sataji and one lakh secretly to Chandrasinh if the peace talks succeed. Daulat Khan of Junagadh secretly made pacts with Mirza Aziz Koka. As Mirza Aziz Koka assured support, he declared the war with Jam Sataji again.

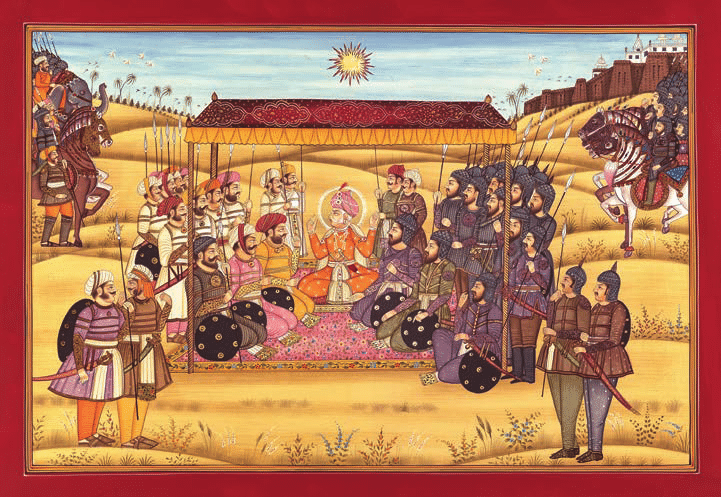
Before the Battle of Bharuch Mori, Chandrasinh Jhala of Halvad (centre) tries to negotiate peace between Mughal (right) and Kathiawad army (left)

When the battle began, the armies of Junagadh left the Kathiawar forces. As Jam Sataji discovered the betrayal, he alighted from his elephant, mounted a fleet horse and left the battlefield to secure the state and family. His minister, Jasa Vajir, and his son Jasaji continued the battle till evening; he also guarded the family of the Jam, whom he placed in ships and despatched by sea, to escape being captured, and afterwards all returned to Nawanagar. The battle started and lasted for three prahars (nine hours approximately). There were 26,000 to 30,000 soldiers on the battlefield. There was a large number of casualties. The artillery, horses, elephants, and camels were also used in the battle.

Jam Sataji's son Kunwar Ajaji III, who was in town due to his wedding feast, left with over 500 Rajput warriors of his wedding party to the battlefield with Nag Vajir.

The next day, the right wing of Mughal forces were led by Sayyid Kasim, Naurang, and Gujar Khan; and the left by Muhammad Rafi, who was a celebrated general, with several imperial Amirs and Zamindars. Mirza Marhum, son of Nawab Azim Humayun, commanded the centre, and before him Mirza Anwar and the Nawab himself took their post. The Nawanagar army was commanded by Jasa Vajir, Kunwar Ajaji, and Mehramanji Dungarani. Nag Vajir, Dahyo Lodak, Bhaljidal were also leading the troops. A cannonade from both armies opened the combat. Muhammad Rafi assailed the army of the Jam with his battalions, while Gujar Khan and Mirza Anwar, the Nawab attacked Kunwar Ajaji, Jasa Vajir.

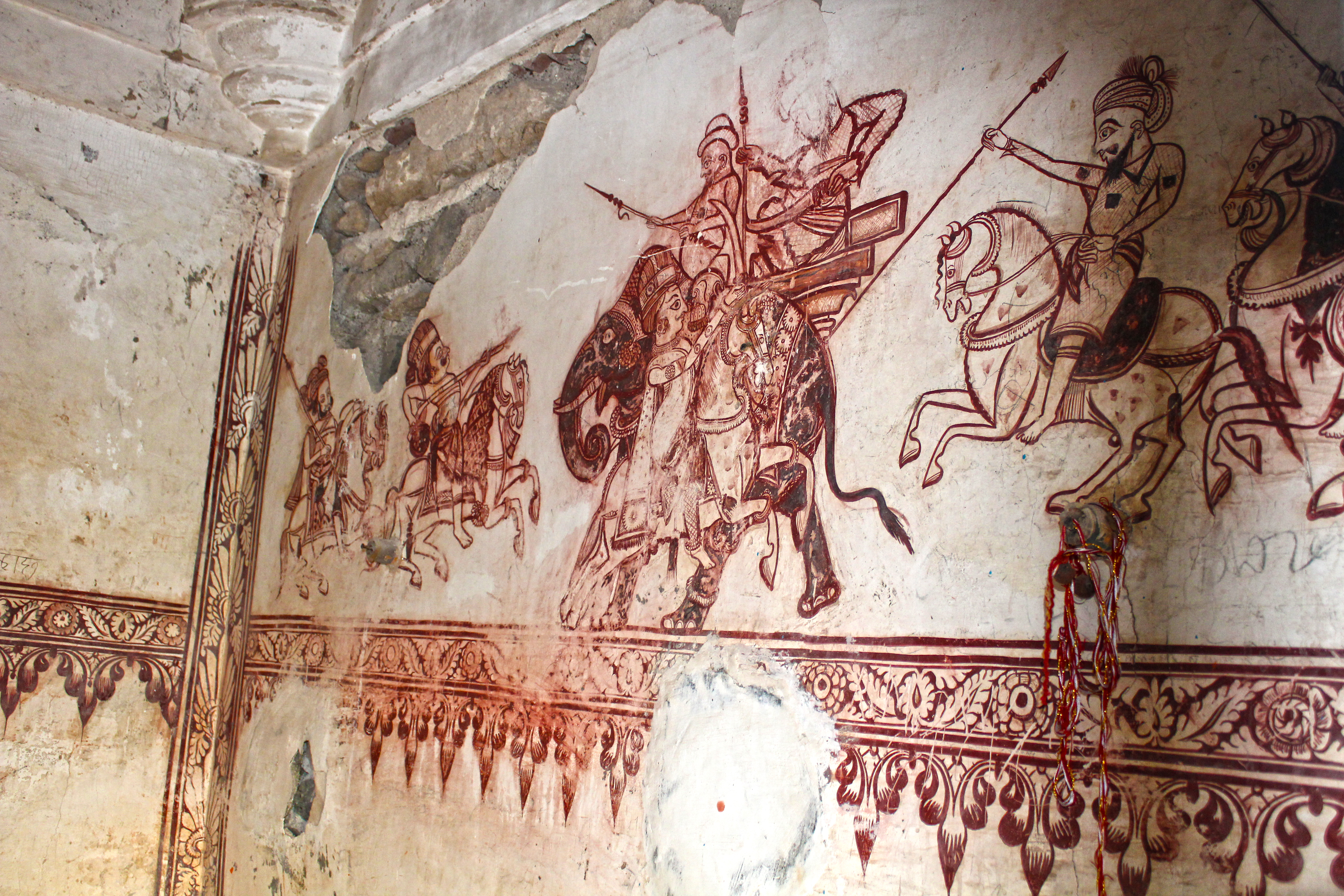
On the north side wall of the memorial shrine, a 16th-century art in traditional style depicting Ajaji on the horse attacking Mirza Aziz Koka on an elephant.

Kunwar Ajaji was on a horse and Mirza Aziz Koka was on an elephant. Ajaji had attacked Mirza Aziz Koka with a spear, but he was not harmed. But Ajaji was attacked by Mughal soldiers and he died on the battlefield. Jasa Vajir, Mehramanji, Dungarani, Bhanjidal, Dahyo Lodak, Nag Vajir, and Togaji Sodha also died on the battlefield. 2000 Kathiawar soldiers died. In the Mughal forces, Mohammed Rafi, Saiyad Saifuddin, Saiyad Kabir, and Saiyad Alikhan also died. Both armies suffered heavily. It is believed that both armies lost more than 10,000 soldiers. More than one thousand Atit Sadhus died. Jam Sataji lost 67 relatives including his son, nephew, and son-in-law. The fourteen sons of Mehramanji also died. The 700 horses of Nawanagar were disabled. In the Mughal army, Muhammad Rafi, Sayyid Sharf-ud-din, Sayyid Kabir, Sayyid Ali Khan, and 100-200 other soldiers died while 500 were wounded.

=== Date ===
According to the notes of the office of Nawanagar, the battle ended on Wednesday, the 7th of the dark fortnight of Shraavana month (Shraavana Vad 7) of Vikram Samvat 1648 (July 1591). The day was a festival day of Shitla Satam. The doha by Gambhirsinh Parmar also gives the same date. (Note: The doha in Gujarati: સંવત સોળ અડતાલીસે, સાવણ માસ ઉદાર, જામ અજો સૂરપૂર ગયો, વદ સાતમ બુધવાર)

According to Akbarnama, the forces met on 4th Amardād or 6th Shawal 999 (14-18 July 1591).

The date of the battle as given by Ranchhodji Diwan, the diwan of Junagadh, in Tarikh-i-Sorath is the 8th of the bright fortnight of the Aaso month, Samvat 1648 or 6th day of Rajab month, Hijri year 1001. (Note: These dates are probably not true as the festival of Shitla Satam is marked as a day of death of Ajaji not corresponding to Vikram Samvat date. Hijri year 1001 correspond to 1593 which does not match.)

== Aftermath ==
As the Mughal army advanced towards Nawanagar, Jam Sataji instructed queens to leave the town by ship from the port. Gopaldas Barhath, the son of Isardasji Barhath of Sachana, reached Surajkunwarba, the recently married Sodha wife of Ajaji, with the Paghadi of Ajaji. Surajkunwarba left the town to reach the battlefield. She was attacked on the way by Mughals but was protected by Thakor Sahib of Dhrol who negotiated even though he had not participated in the battle due to personal differences with Jam Sataji. She reached the battlefield and committed Sati on the funeral pyre of Ajaji.

Mirza Aziz Koka reached Nawanagar and plundered it. Jam Sataji left to Junagadh to save Muzaffar. Daulat Khan was wounded in the battle and went off the Junagadh and died later. The Mughal Army reached Junagadh but returned to Ahmedabad as it was fatigued due to the long season. In 1592 AD, Mirza Aziz Koka again proceeded to Kathiawar with fresh forces. He besieged Junagadh and the garrison surrendered after three months. Muzaffar had already left to the Barda hills. The Mughal army finally left to Ahmedabad after placing a governor at Junagadh. They also eventually conquered Somnath, Dwarka, and Bet Dwarka.

After leaving the Barda hills, Muzaffar reached Okha Mandal where he spent some time. Mirza Aziz Koka sent his son with troops to capture him. Sava Wadher died while covering the escape of Muzaffar. Muzaffar reached Kutch from Vasta Bandar and requested asylum from Rao Bharamalji I of Kutch. The Mughal army was sent to Morbi and prepared to cross Rann of Kutch to enter Kutch. Rao surrender Muzaffar to the troops sent for his capture as he knew the fate of Nawanagar and Junagadh. While being escorted to the Mughal camp, Muzaffar alighted from his horse near Dhrol after traveling the whole night. He went behind a tree on some pretence and committed suicide by cutting his own throat with a knife on 24 December 1592. With his death, the rule of the Muzaffarid dynasty of Gujarat Sultanate ended.

Morbi was granted to Rao Bharmalji as a jagir for his service. Jam Sataji returned Nawanagar in 1593 AD (Vikram Samvat 1649). He lived at Nawanagar but the affairs of the state were managed by the Mughal deputy with his concert. Jasaji, the second son of Jam Sataji, was kept at Delhi for some time. In the absence of Sataji, Kalabai; the queen of Kunwar Bhanji, the son of Rana Ramdevji of Ranpur; had conquered the areas formerly lost to Nawanagar with the help of Mers and Rabaris and established its new capital at Chhaya village.

== Legacy ==
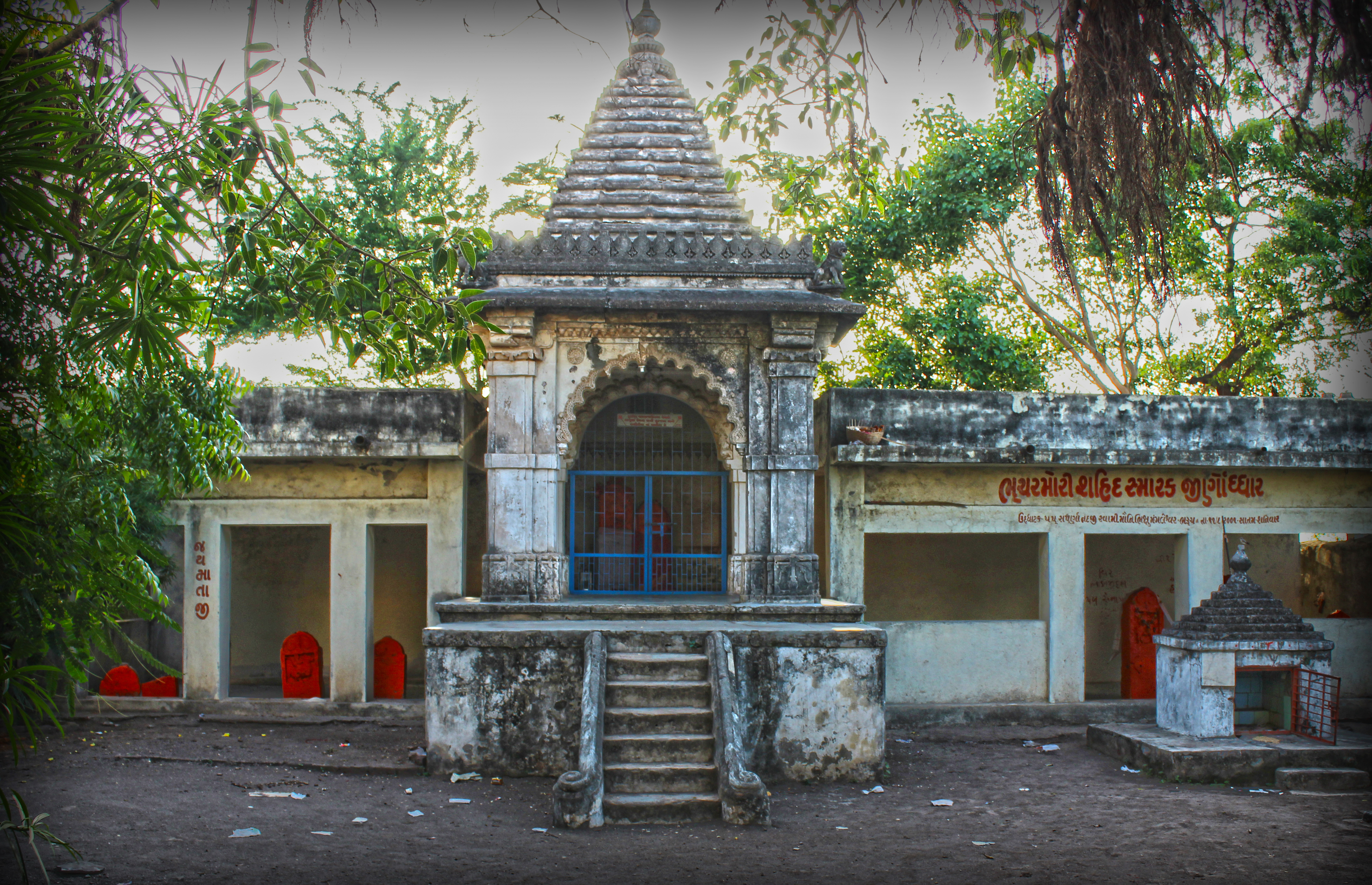
Memorial shrine of Ajaji and nearby paliyas (herostones)

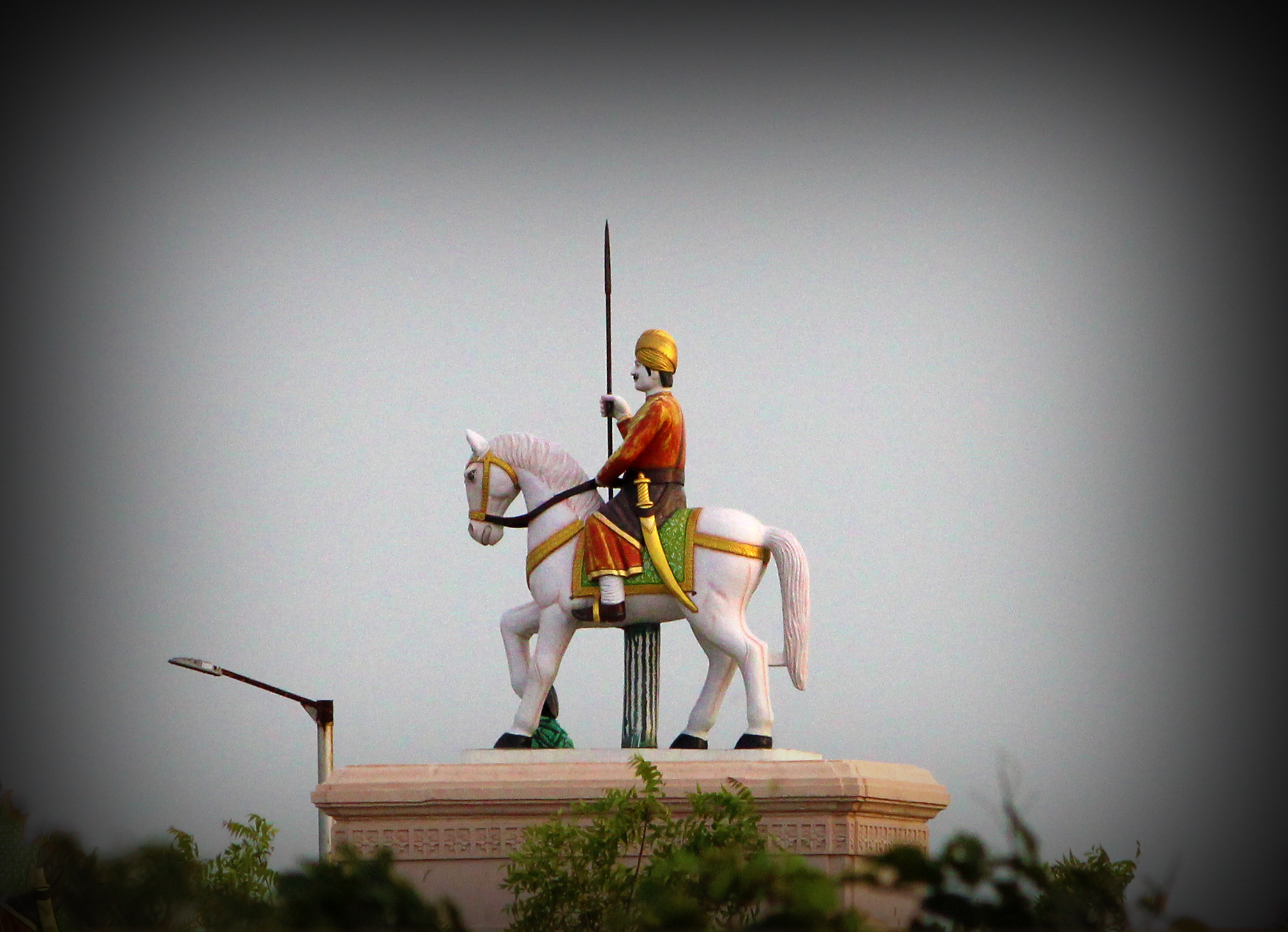
Horse-mounted statue of Ajaji at the site

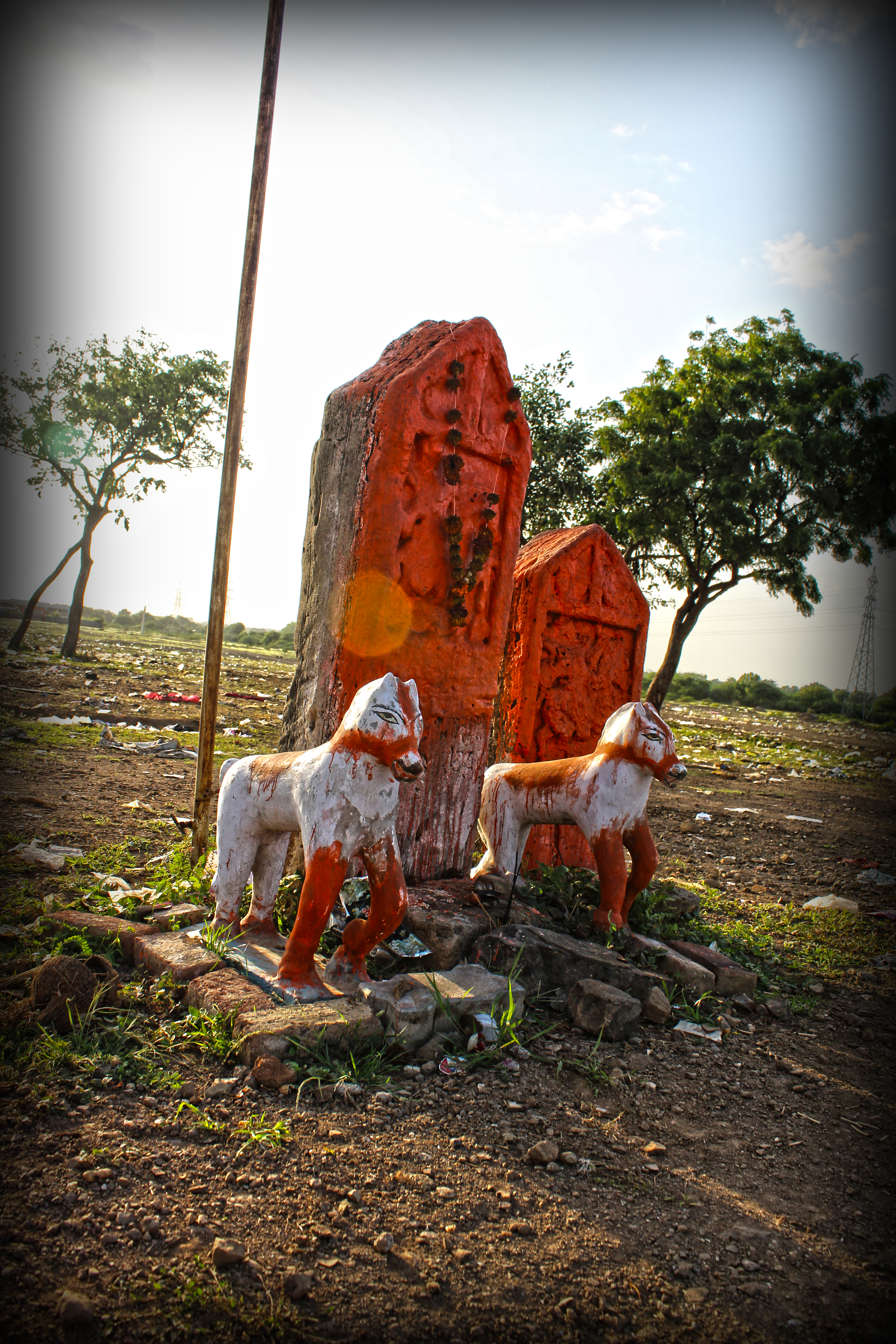
Paliya

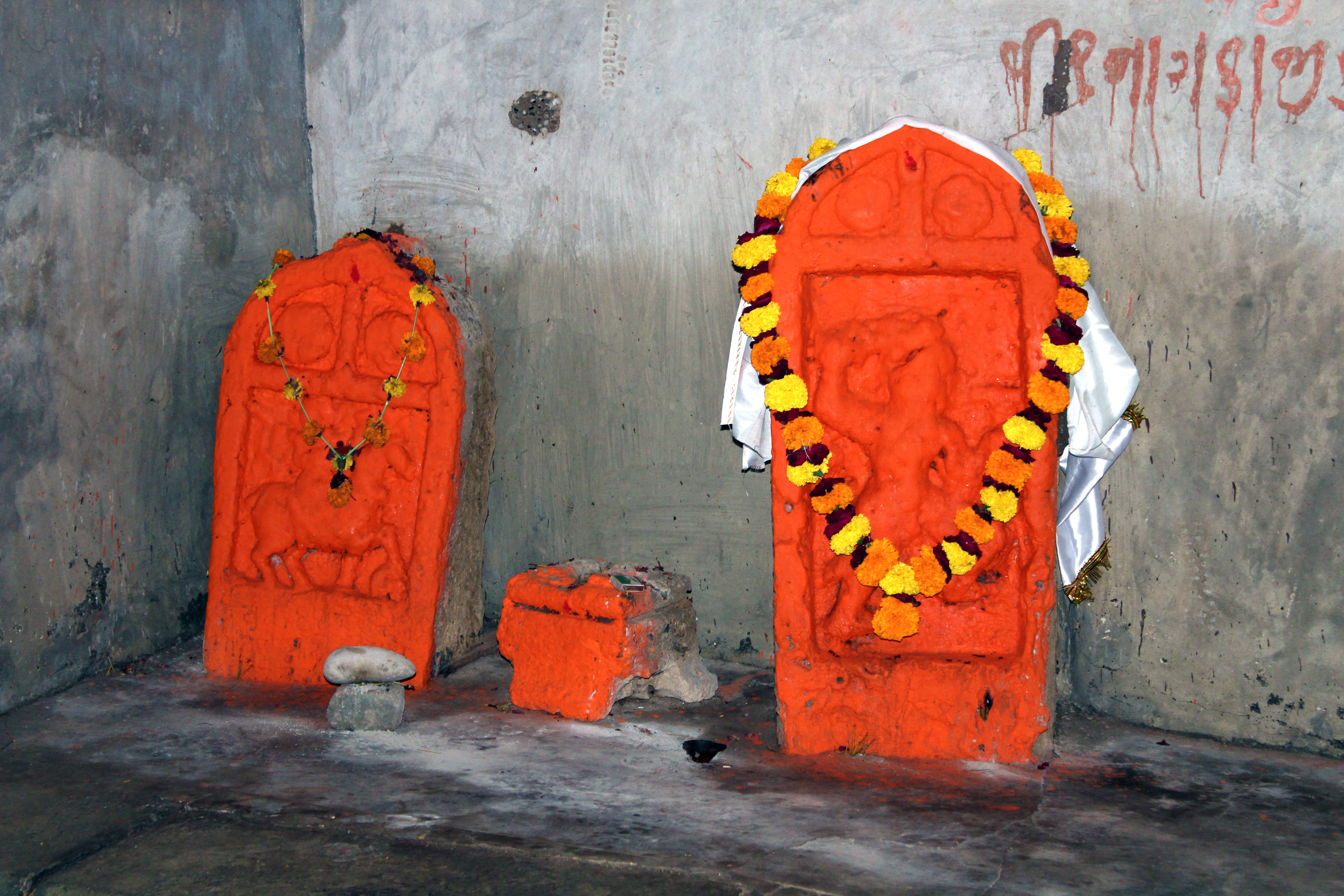
Paliya of Nag Vajir on right

Many folklore, songs, historical fictions and stories originated from the event. Due to large number of casualty, in Halar region, the word Bhuchar Mori became almost synonymous with the massacre.

=== Memorial site ===
The memorial site is situated on the plateau of Bhuchar Mori. There is paliya or memorial stone of Ajaji in a shrine. The paliya dedicated to his wife Surajkunwarba, stand south of it. On the north side wall of the shrine, there is a 16th-century art in traditional style depicting Ajaji on the horse attacking Mirza Aziz Koka on an elephant. There are 23 more paliyas in the compound. More eight memorials are outside of the compound and one dedicated to Rakhehar Dholi is some distance away. There are 32 memorials in total. There are eight tombs on the southwest of the shrine dedicated to the soldiers of the Mughal army. The site had a well and a mosque.

A new memorial was commissioned by Government of Gujarat at the site in 2007 and it was completed in September 2015. A memorial forest, Shaheed Van, was opened to public in August 2016. Since 1992, the memorial site is visited by people of Kshatriya community for prayers on Shitla Satam. The annual fair is organized on the last of the Shravan month (Shravan Vad Amavasya) which is attended by thousands.

=== Mourning ===
As Kunwar Ajaji had died on Shraavana Vad 7, Shitla Satam, the people of Navanagar State and adjoining Halar region had stopped the celebrations of the day. After years, when Bapubha, son of Jam Ranmalji born on the same day, the people started the celebrations of Shitla Satam. The people mourned for nearly 250 years on the day.

=== In literature ===
Durso Adho, the court poet of Akbar, wrote a poetry with mixture of love and heroic moods titled Kumar Shri Ajajini Bhuchar Morini Gajgat. The event is described in the works of court poets of Nawanagar; Vibhavilas (1893) by Vajmalji Mahedu and Yaduvansh Prakash (1934) by Mavdanji Ratnu. Gujarati author Jhaverchand Meghani had written a novel, Samarangan in 1938 based on the event. Harilal Upadhyay wrote Ranmedan (1993) focused on the background which led to the battle.
