= Bhuchar Mori =

- Location within Gujarat Location within India
- 22°34′57.97″N 70°23′51.6″E
- Type: memorial site
- Location: Near Dhrol, Jamnagar district, Gujarat, India
- Nearest city: Rajkot

History
- Built: 16th century
- Built for: Battle of Bhuchar Mori

Site notes
- Restored: 2015
- Restored by: Government of Gujarat
- Governing body: Bhuchar Mori Shahid Smarak Trust

Bhuchar Mori is a plateau and historic site about two kilometres (one mile) northwest of Dhrol, a town about 50 kilometres (31 mi) north of Rajkot, Gujarat, India. The place is known for the Battle of Bhuchar Mori and a memorial site dedicated to it. The annual fair dedicated to the event is organised in July and August.

== Etymology ==
Bhuchar Mori, a Mori branch of Rajput community, used to sit on the plateau while his animals fed on grass. The place was referred to as Bhuchar Mori No Timbo after him. It is said that the bad omens, such as voices of the birds, at the place had foretold about the future battle.

== Battle of Bhuchar Mori ==
The battle of Bhuchar Mori was fought between the army of Kathiawar led by Nawanagar State and the Mughal army in July 1591 (Vikram Samvat 1648). It was meant to protect Muzaffar Shah III, the last Sultan of Gujarat Sultanate who had taken asylum under Jam Sataji of Nawanagar after his escape from the Mughal emperor Akbar. The Kathiawar army included the armies of Junagadh who betrayed Nawanagar and joined the Mughal army at last. The battle led to a large number of casualties on both sides. The battle resulted in the victory of the Mughal and Junagadh

It is considered the largest battle in the history of Saurashtra. It is often dubbed as the Panipat of Saurashtra. Due to the large number of casualties, in Halar region, the word Bhuchar Mori became almost synonymous with the massacre.

== Memorial site ==
The paliya or memorial stone of Ajaji is a horse-mounted idol. The paliya with the hand, dedicated to his wife Surajkunwarba, stand south of it. The inscription on the stone can not be read. There is an inscription in the shrine that the memorial site was renovated by Jam Vibhaji and the shrine was constructed by him on the palia of Ajaji. On the north side wall of the shrine, there is a 16th-century art in traditional style depicting Ajaji on the horse attacking Mirza Aziz Koka on an elephant. There are shrines dedicated to Ram, Laxman and Bhutnath in the compound. To the north of the shrine, there are eight paliya on the floor; including dedicated to Jesha Vajir. There are four paliyas in the row and more three of large size nearby. There are six paliyas to the south of the shrine of which three are partially damaged. There are three black poorly shaped stones in the north of the opposite side of shrine which are dedicated to Atit Sadhus. There are 23 memorials in the compound. Eight more memorials are outside of the compound and one dedicated to Rakhehar Dholi is some distance away. There are 32 memorials in total. The site is visited by people of Jamnagar every year and the worship these memorials with Sindoor.

There are eight tombs on the southwest of the shrine dedicated to the soldiers of the Mughal army. It is believed that soldiers were buried together and eight tombs dedicated to leaders were built on it. The site also has a well and a mosque.

Since 1998, the site is maintained by Bhuchar Mori Shahid Smarak Trust. The site is a protected monument of the archaeological department of the state (S-GJ-84). A new memorial was commissioned by Government of Gujarat headed by Narendra Modi in 2007. The groundbreaking ceremony was held in 2007 and the memorial was completed in September 2015. The new statue of Ajaji was placed at the site which was inaugurated by Anandiben Patel. The government declared that a dedicated forest, Shaheed Van, at site will be developed also.

Since 1992, the memorial site is visited by people of Kshatriya community for prayers on Shitla Satam. The annual fair is organized on the last day of the Shraavana month (Shraavana Vad Amavasya) (July–August) which is attended by thousands.

== Gallery ==
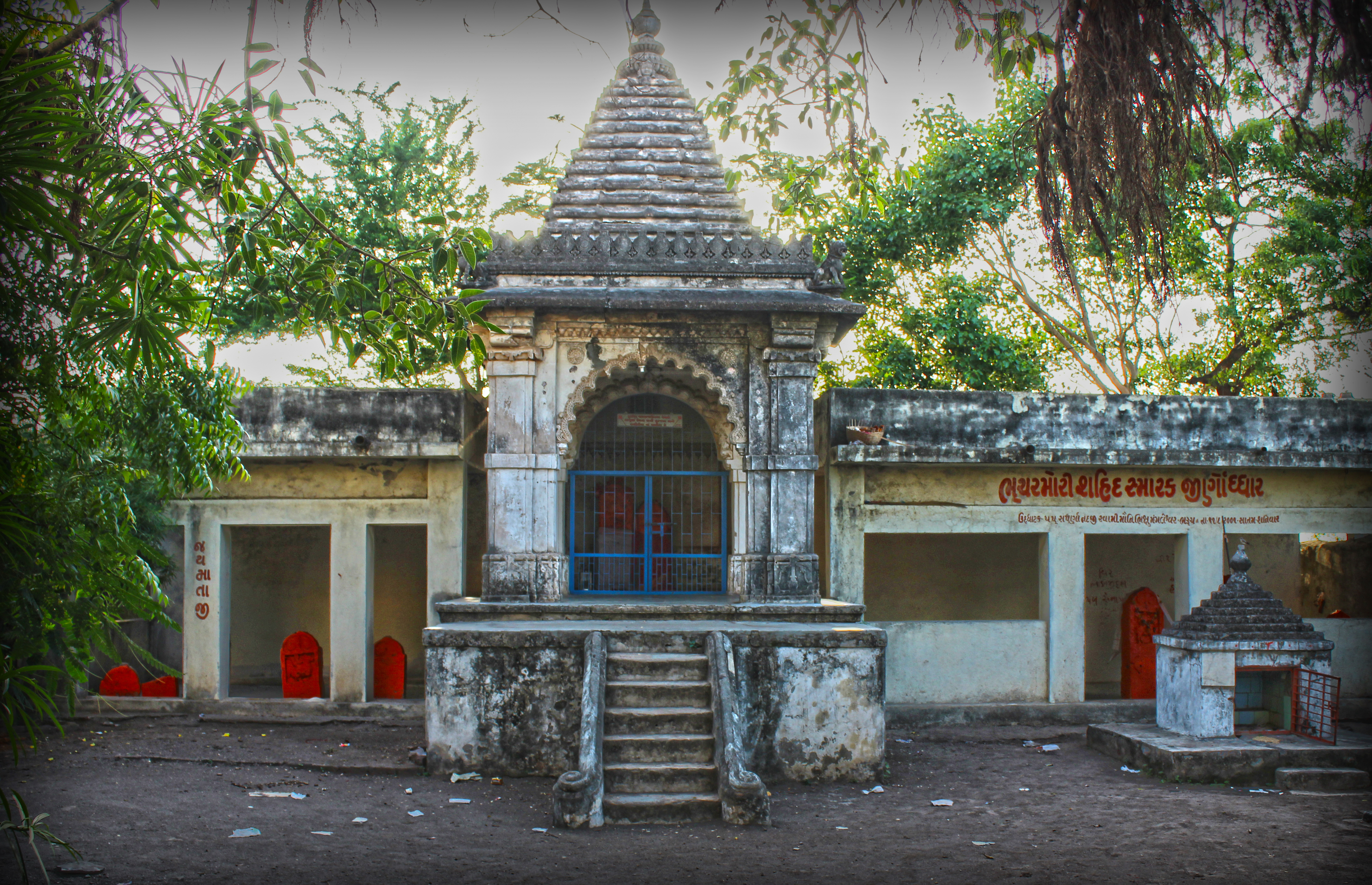
Memorial shrine of Ajaji and nearby paliyas (herostones)

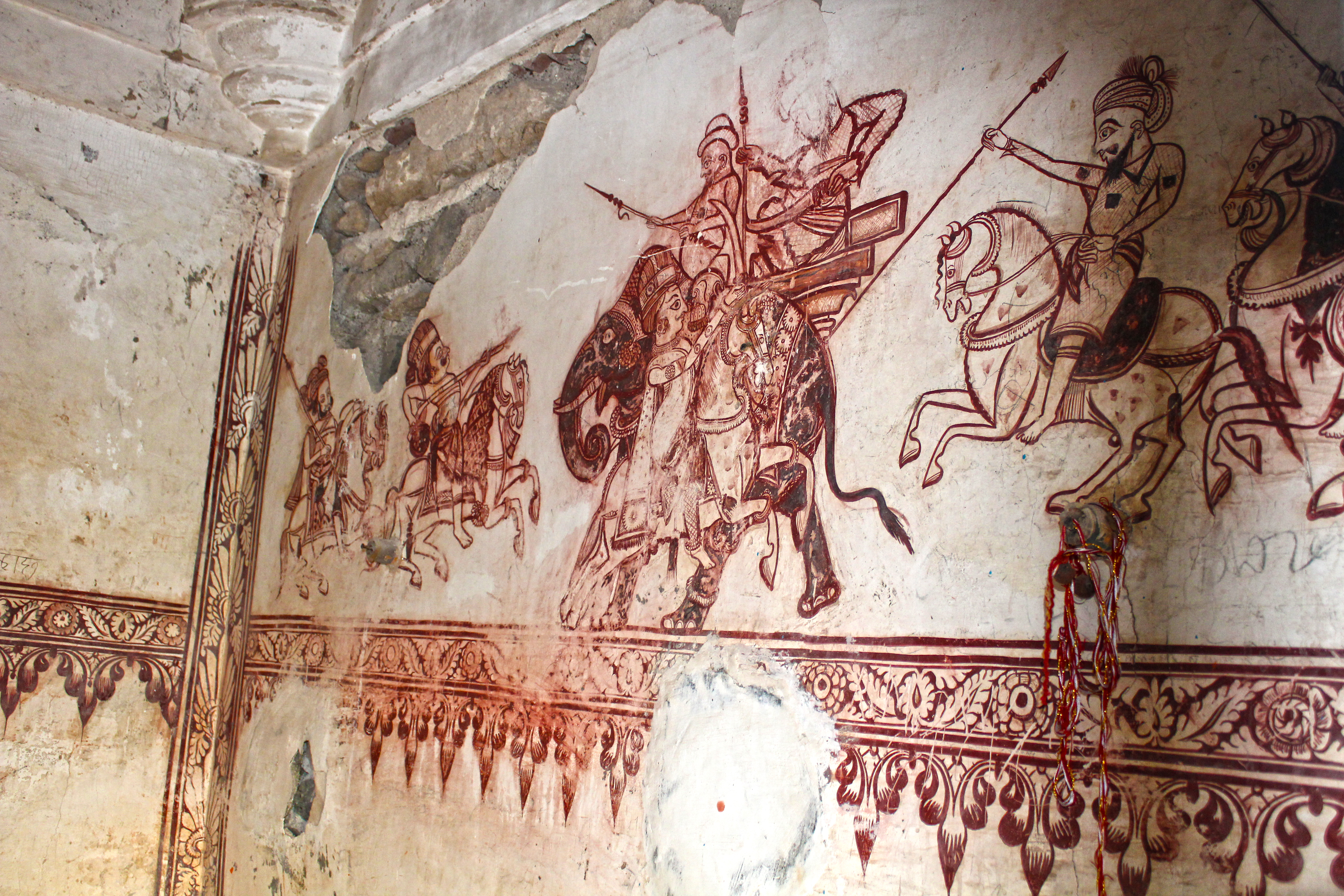
16th-century mural on the north side wall of the shrine depicting Ajaji on the horse attacking Mirza Aziz Koka on an elephant

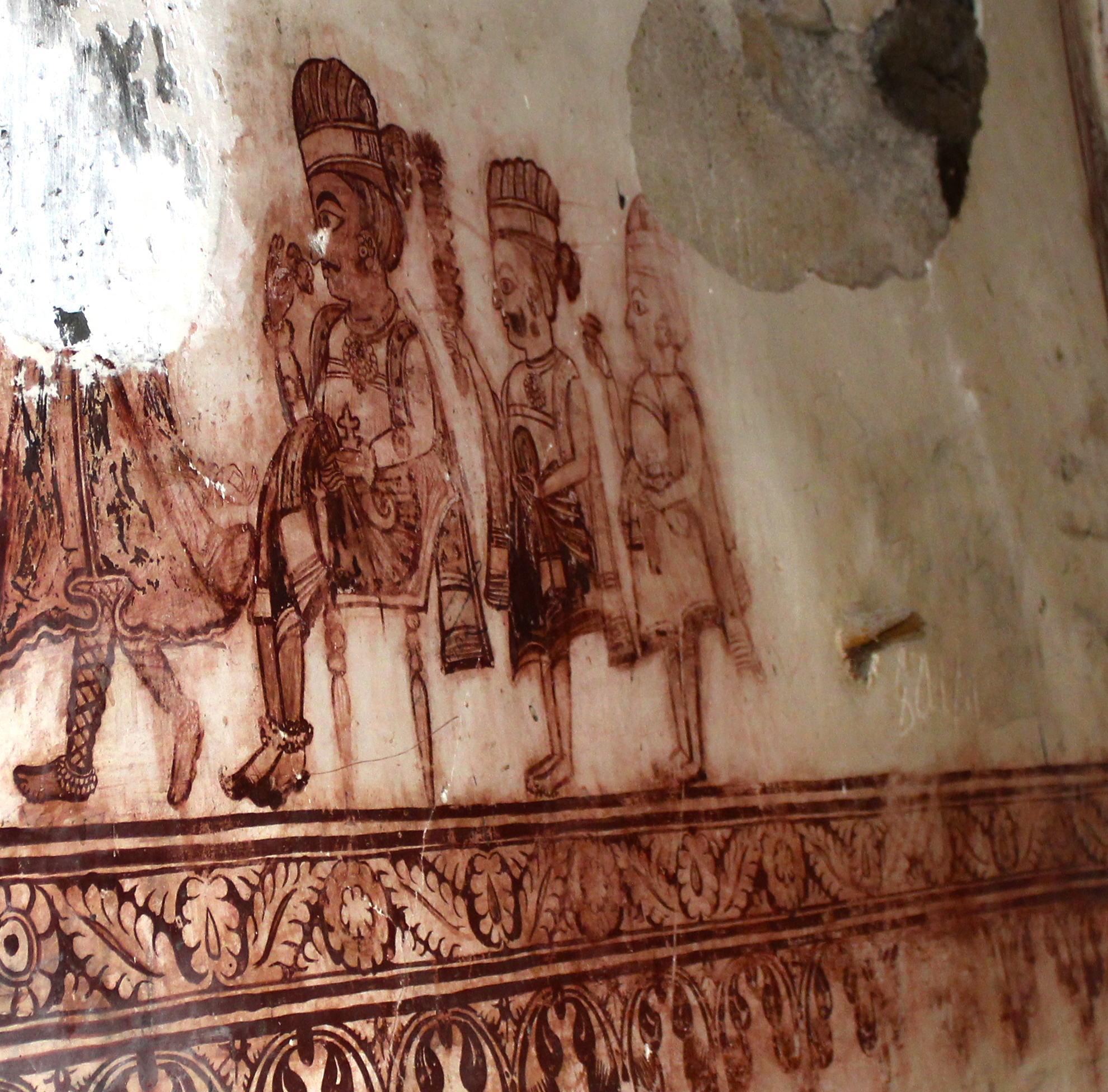
Murals in the shrine of Ajaji

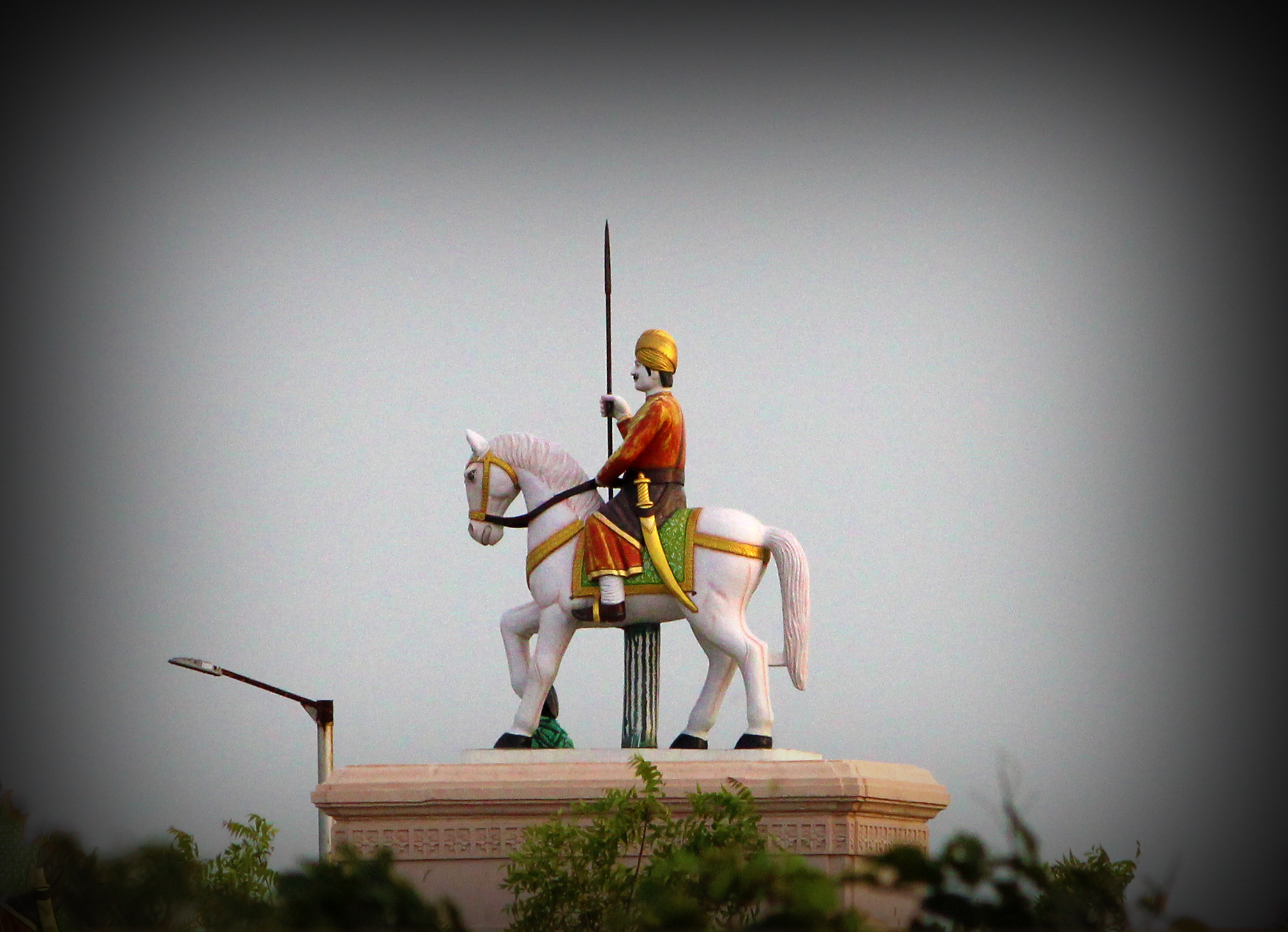
Horse-mounted statue of Ajaji at the site

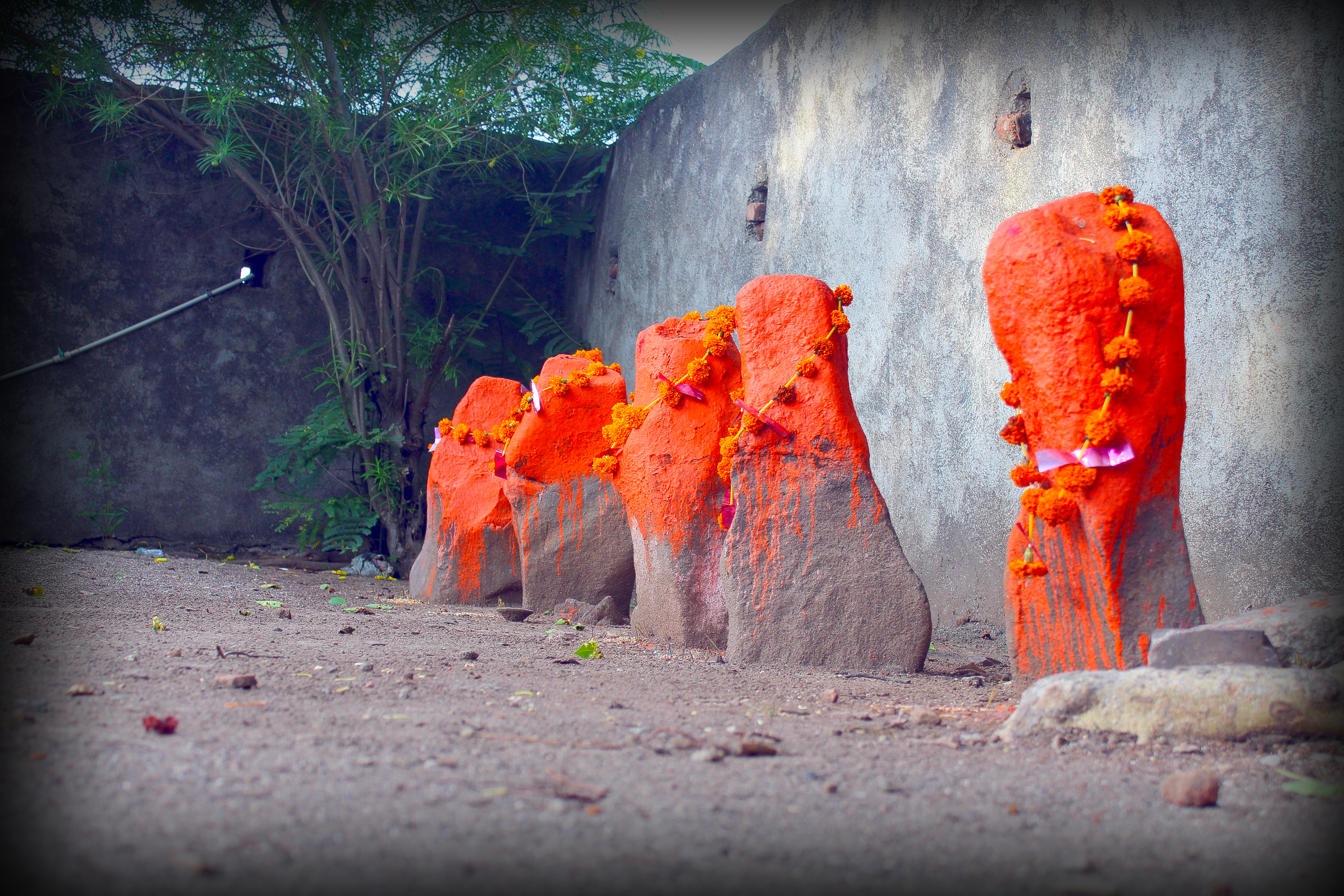
Paliya

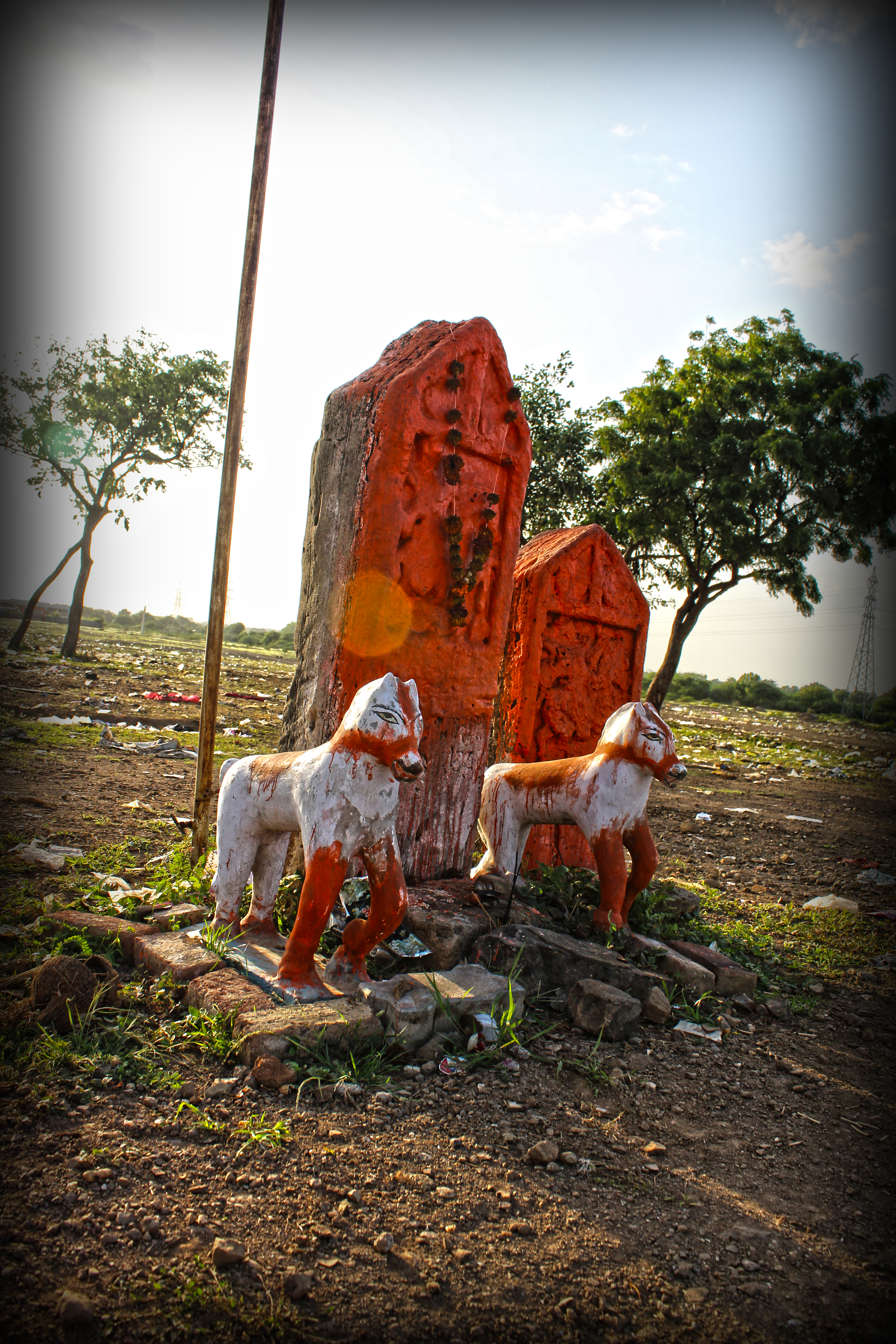
Paliya

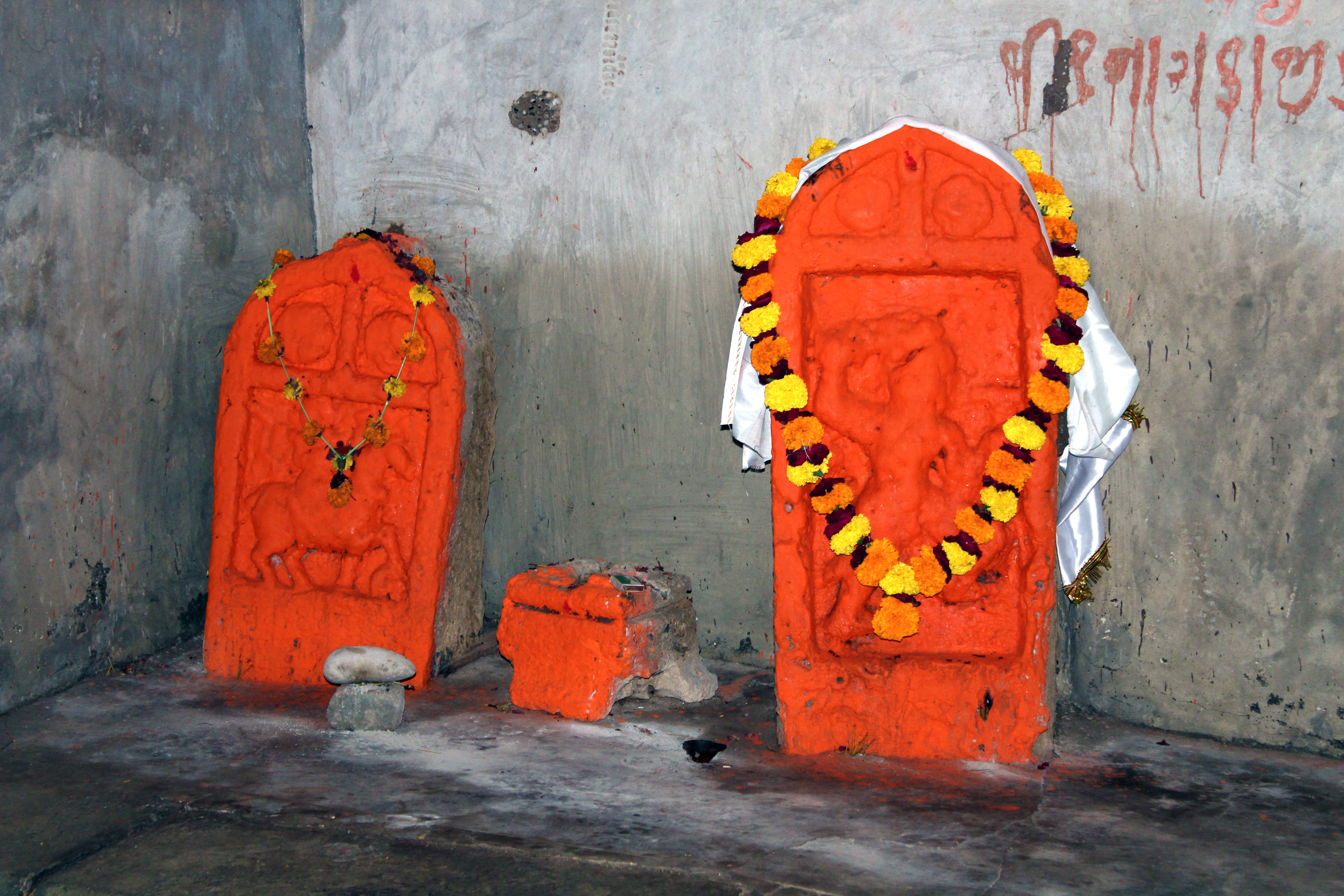
Paliya of Nag Vajir on right
