= Battle of Panipat =

The Battle of Panipat may refer to the three important battles fought at Panipat, India:

- First Battle of Panipat (1526), fought between the Mughals under Babur and Ibrahim Lodi (ruler of Lodi dynasty)
- Second Battle of Panipat (1556), fought between Hemchandra Vikramaditya (a general of Muhammad Adil Shah Suri) and the Mughals Emperor Akbar(under the regency of Bairam Khan)
- Third Battle of Panipat (1761), fought between the Maratha Empire and the Durrani Empire under the Afghan king Ahmad Shah Abdali

== See also ==
- Raid of Panipat (1770), fought between Dal Khalsa under Jassa Singh Ahluwalia and Mughal Empire under Zabita Khan
- Panipat (film), a 2019 Indian film by Ashutosh Gowarikar based on the Third Battle of Panipat
