= Dhrol =

- city
- Location in Gujarat, India Dhrol (India)
- Coordinates: 22.57°N 70.42°E
- Country: India
- State: Gujarat
- District: Jamnagar
- Elevation: 26 m (85 ft)

Population (2011)
  - Total: 25,883

Languages
  - Official: Gujarati, Hindi
- Time zone: UTC+5:30 (IST)
- PIN: 361210
- Vehicle registration: GJ-10
- Website: Dhrol

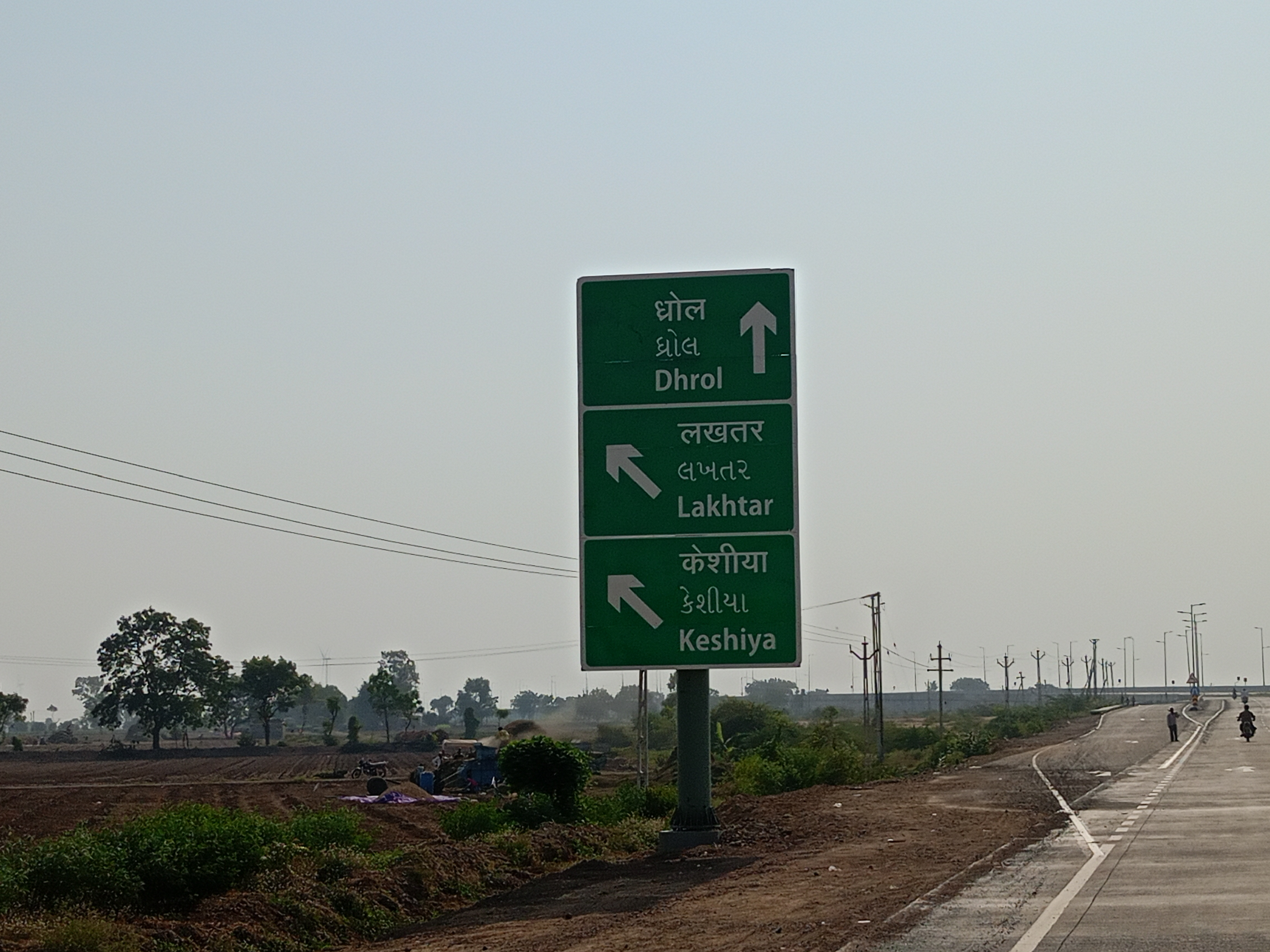
Signboard of keshiya Dhrol at village lakhtar on nh151a

Dhrol is a city and a municipality in Jamnagar district in the state of Gujarat, India.

== Geography ==
Dhrol is located at 22.57°N 70.42°E. It has an average elevation of 26 metres (85 feet).

== Demographics ==
As of 2011 India census, Dhrol has a population of 25,883. Males constitute 51% of the population and females 49%. Dhrol has an average literacy rate of 80.30%, higher than the national average of 72.98% and state average of 78.03%: male literacy is 86.45% and, female literacy is 74.94%. In Dhrol, 12% of the population is under 6 years of age. Dhrol has a female sex ratio of 960 against the state average of 919.

== Education ==
The Sunrise School provides primary education in English and Gujarati.

The M.D. Mehta Girls PTC College provides teacher training.

SHRI B.M. PATEL EDUCATIONAL INSTITUTE - VANKIYA (L.K.G. TO STD -12) (SCIENCE & COMMERCE)

== Places of interest ==
Bhuchar Mori is a historic site 2 kilometres (1.2 mi) from Dhrol, where the Battle of Bhuchar Mori was fought in 1591. The site has a memorials of the people who died in the battle. It was fought between the army of Nawanagar State led by Jam Ajaji, son of Jam Sataji, and the Mughal forces led by Mirza Aziz Koka.

Shahid Van is near to Bhuchar Mori. The site is a tourist attraction developed by Dhrol Municipality and inaugurated by Vijay Rupani, the Chief Minister of Gujarat.

== Notable individuals ==
- A. H. Jami – famous Gujarati cartoonist

== See also ==
- Dhrol State
