= Art of Rajasthan =

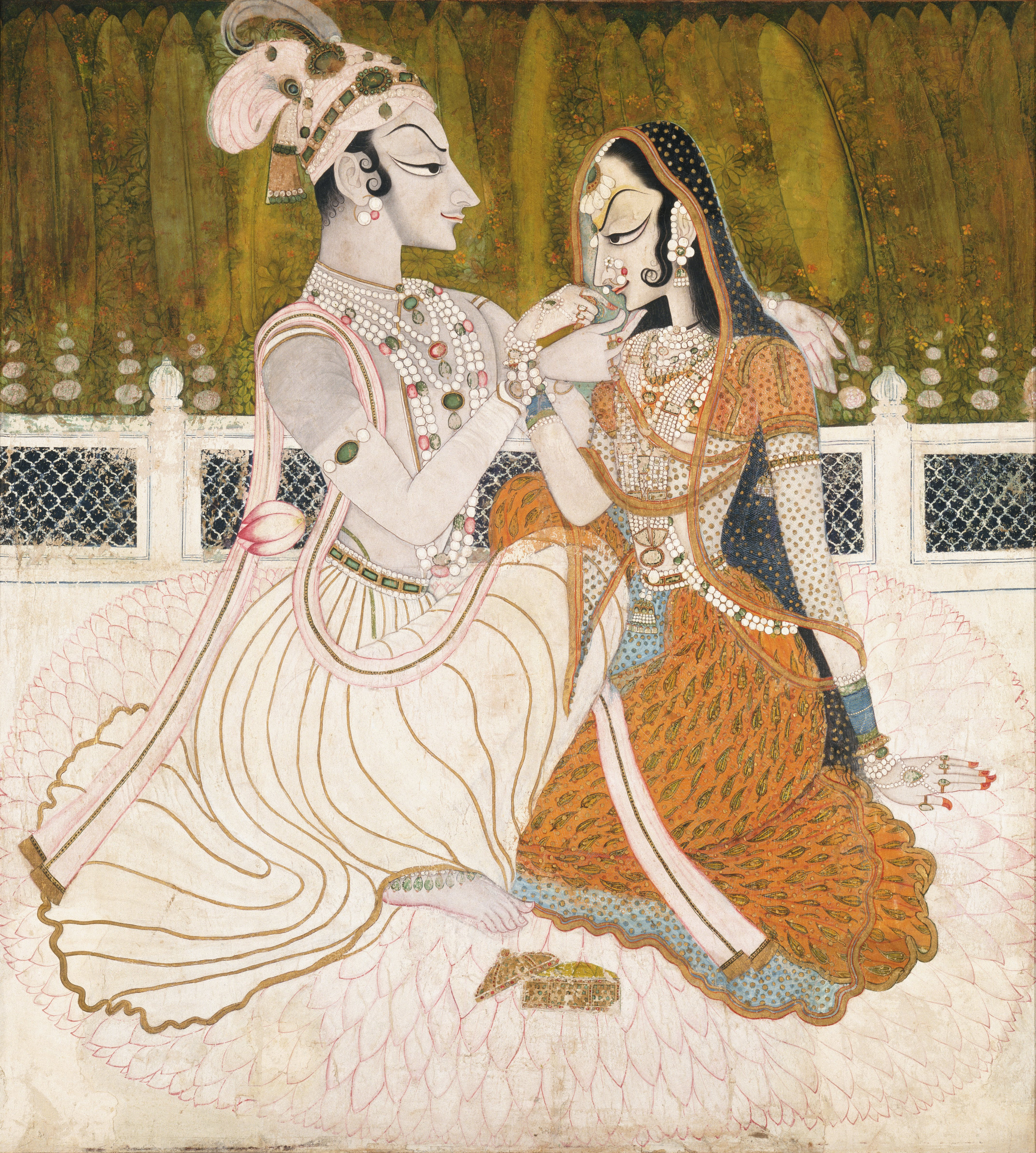
Krishna and Radha, attributed to Nihal Chand, a master of the Kishangarh miniature school trained at the imperial court in Delhi.

Apart from the architecture of Rajasthan, the most notable forms of the visual art of Rajasthan are architectural sculpture on Hindu and Jain temples in the medieval era, in painting illustrations to religious texts, beginning in the late medieval period, and post-Mughal miniature painting in the Early Modern period, where various different court schools developed, together known as Rajput painting. In both cases, Rajasthani art had many similarities to that of the neighbouring region of Gujarat, the two forming most of the region of "Western India", where artistic styles often developed together.

== Architecture ==
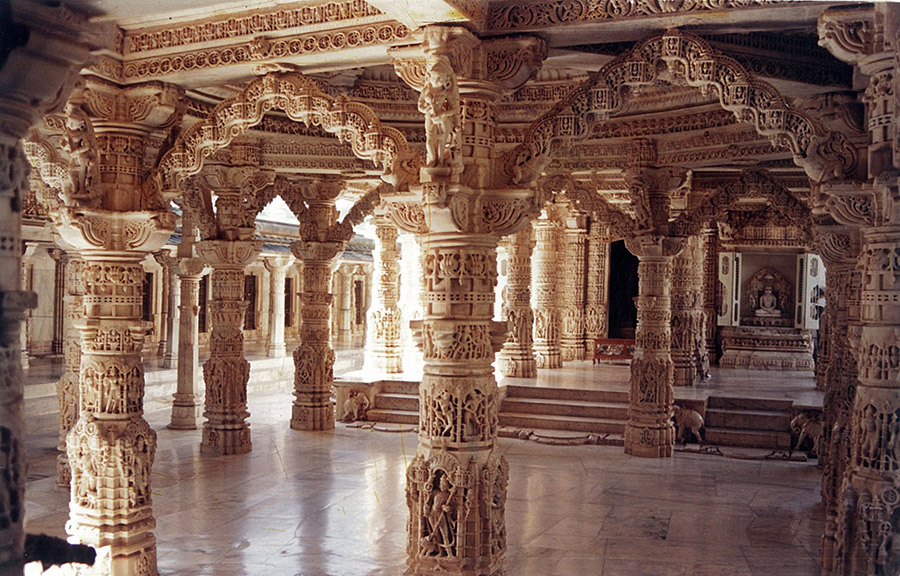
Interior of Jain Luna Vasahi temple at Dilwara, Mount Abu, 1230 and later, with typical "flying arches".

The architecture of Rajasthan has usually been a regional variant of the style of Indian architecture prevailing in north India at the time. Rajasthan is especially notable for the forts and palaces of the many Rajput rulers, which are popular tourist attractions.

Most of the population of Rajasthan is Hindu, and there has historically been a considerable Jain minority; this mixture is reflected in the many temples of the region. Māru-Gurjara architecture, or "Solaṅkī style" is a distinctive style that began in Rajasthan and neighbouring Gujarat around the 11th century, and has been revived and taken to other parts of India and the world by both Hindus and Jains. This represents the main contribution of the region to Hindu temple architecture. The Dilwara Jain Temples of Mount Abu built between the 11th and 13th centuries CE are the best-known examples of the style.

The Adhai Din Ka Jhonpra mosque in Ajmer (no longer in religious use) is an important early example of Indo-Islamic architecture in a state not otherwise notable for this; though the Ajmer Sharif Dargah is another early building. However, there is considerable influence from Mughal architecture in palaces and houses, and Rajasthan has some claim to have sent influence back in elements like the jharokha enclosed balcony and chhatri open pavilions.

== Monumental sculpture ==
Māru-Gurjara architecture, or the "Solaṅkī style" features large amounts of sculpture, with the emphasis usually on great numbers of small, sharply carved figures, rather than larger single figures or groups. These include friezes with repeated figures of animals, sometimes with human riders, running around the bases of temples.

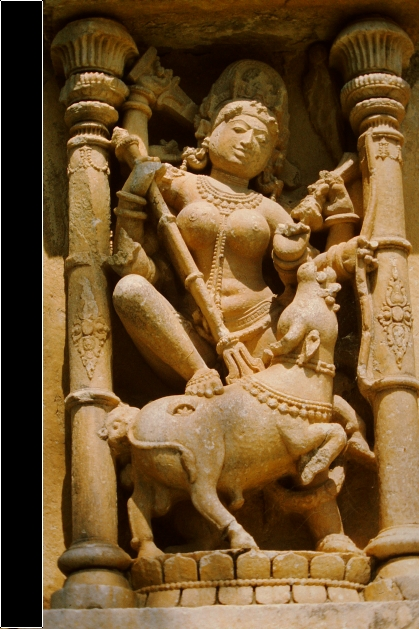
Durga on the Ambika Mata temple in Jagat, by 960

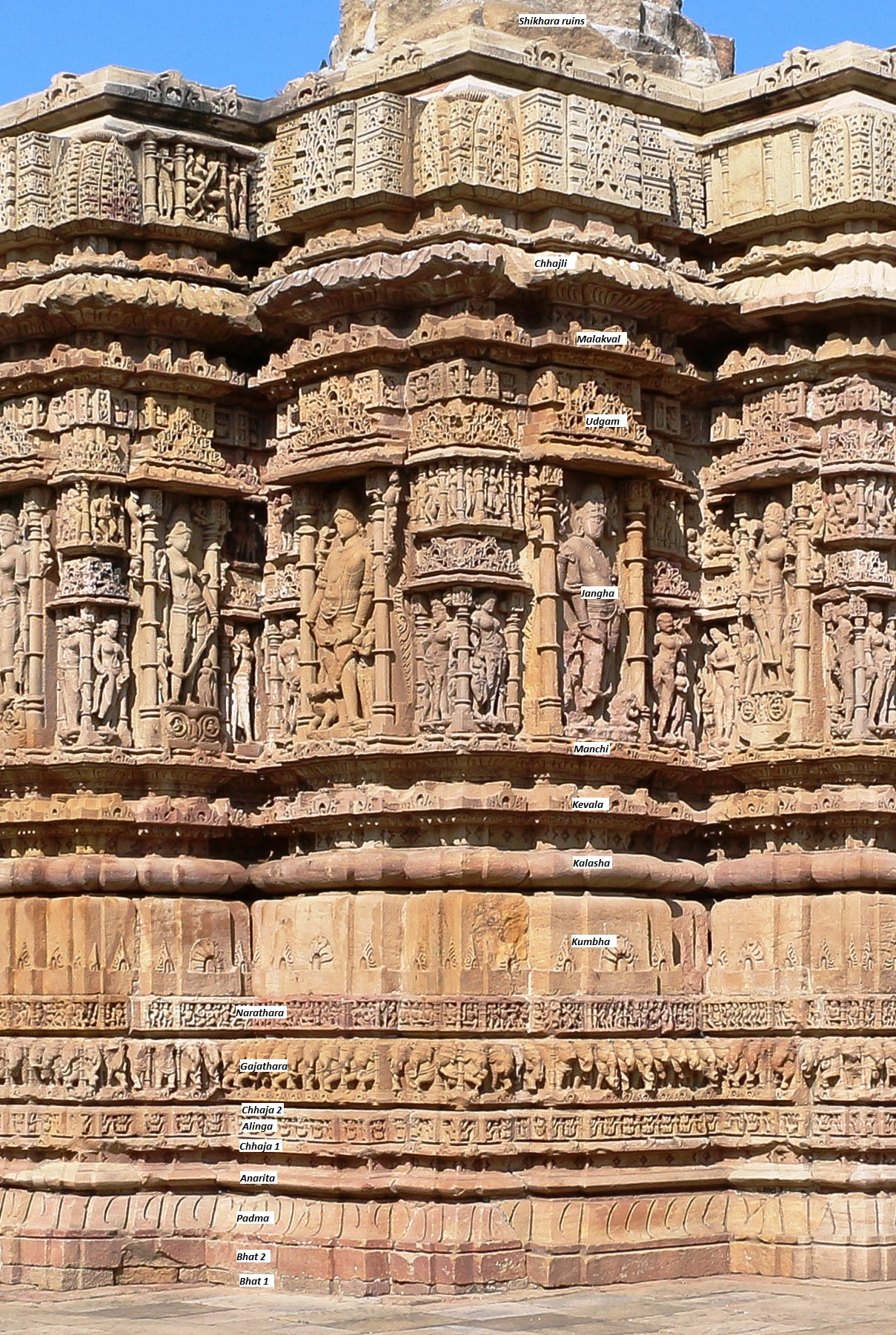
Wall below the shikhara, Sun Temple, Modhera, 1020s

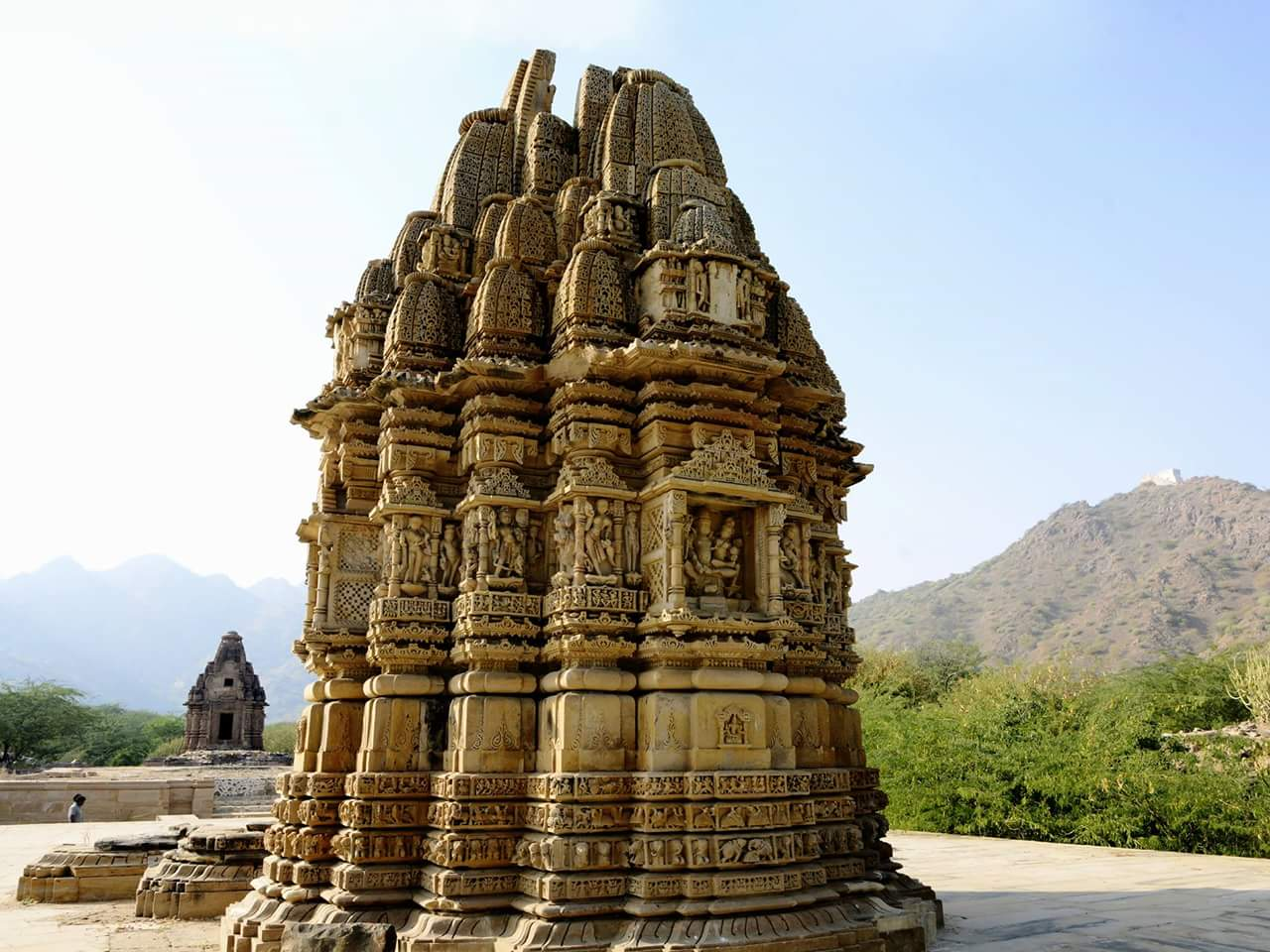
Kiradu temples

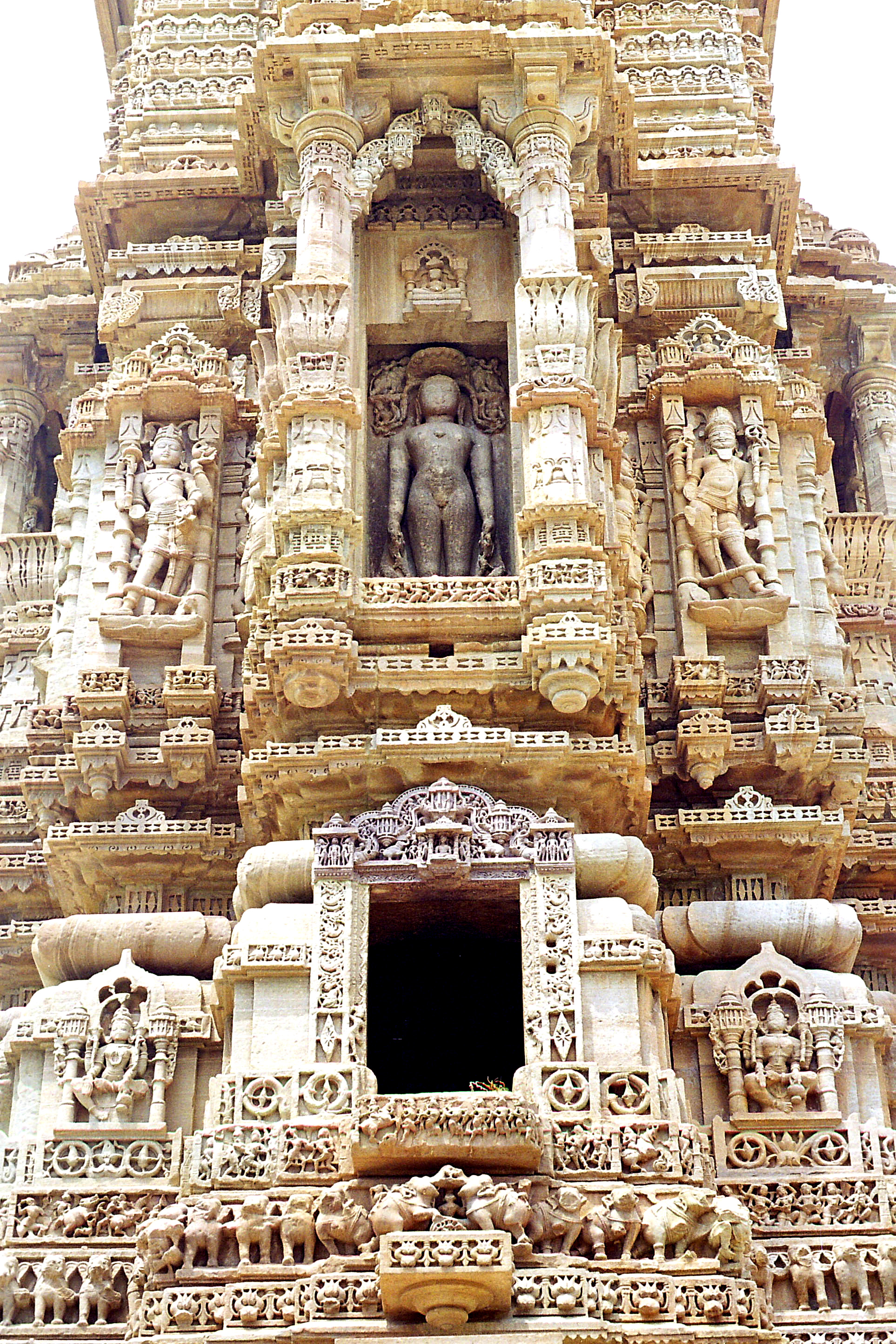
Detail of the Jain Kirti Stambha tower, Chittor Fort

== Medieval painting ==
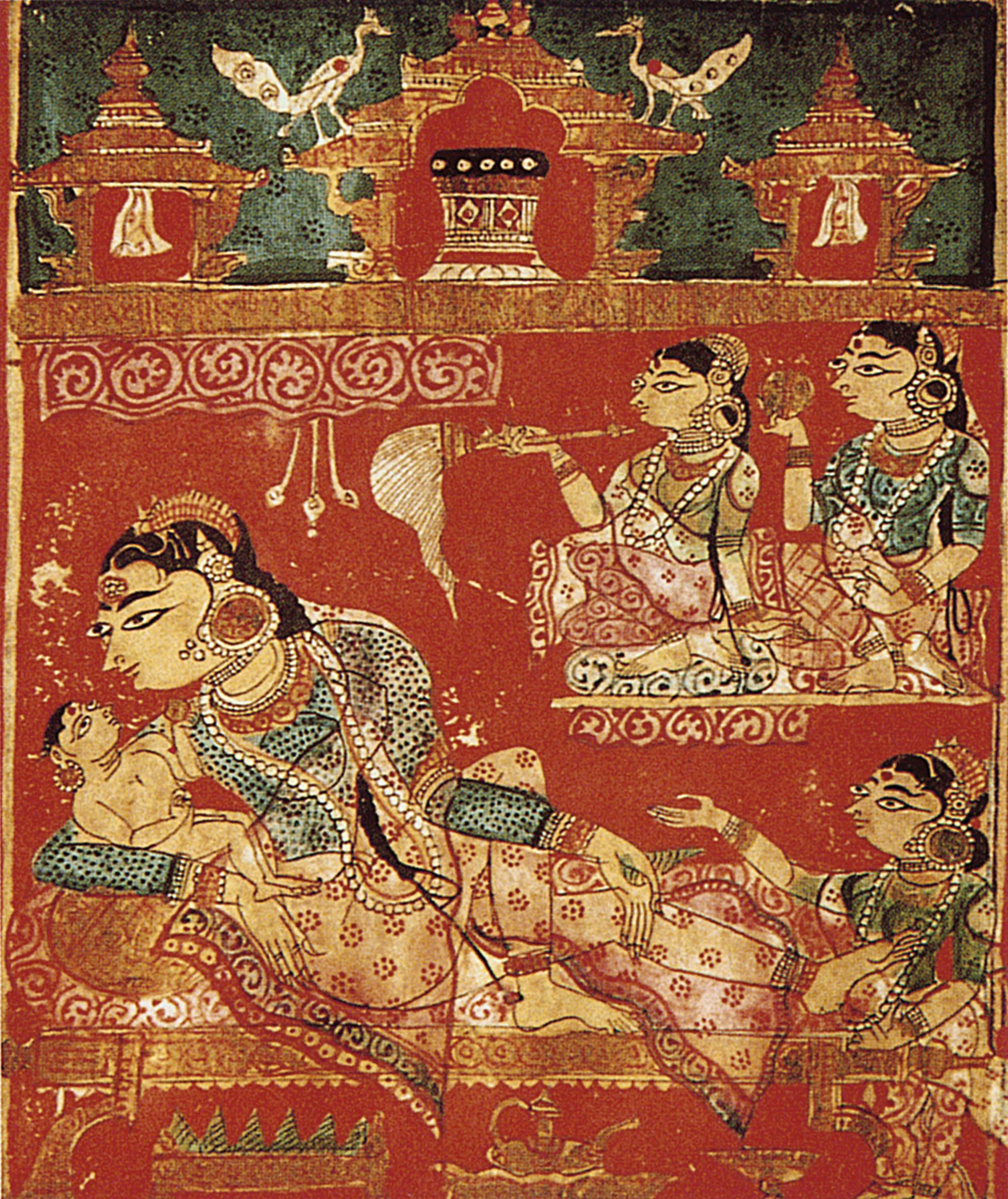
The birth of Mahavira, from the Kalpa Sūtra (c. 1375–1400 CE)

Jain temples and monasteries had mural paintings from at least 2,000 years ago, though pre-medieval survivals are rare. In addition, many Jain manuscripts were illustrated with paintings, sometimes lavishly so. In both these cases, Jain art parallels Hindu art, but the Jain examples are more numerous among the earliest survivals. The manuscripts begin around the 11th century, but are mostly from the 13th onwards, and were made mainly in Gujarat, with some in Rajasthan. By the 15th century they were becoming increasingly lavish, with much use of gold.

The manuscript text most frequently illustrated is the Kalpa Sūtra, containing the biographies of the Tirthankaras, notably Parshvanatha and Mahavira. The illustrations are square-ish panels set in the text, with "wiry drawing" and "brilliant, even jewel-like colour". The figures are always seen in three-quarters view, with distinctive "long pointed noses and protruding eyes". There is a convention whereby the more distant side of the face protrudes, so that both eyes are seen.

== Rajput painting ==
In the late 16th Century, the Rajput courts began to develop distinctive styles of miniature painting, combining indigenous as well as foreign influences such as Persian, Mughal, Chinese and European. Rajasthani painting consists of four principal schools that have within them several artistic styles and substyles that can be traced to the various princely states that patronised these artists. The four principal schools are:

1. The Mewar school that contains the Chavand, Nathdwara, Devgarh, Udaipur and Sawar styles of painting
2. The Marwar school comprising the Kishangarh, Bikaner, Jodhpur, Nagaur, Pali and Ghanerao styles
3. The Hadoti school with the Kota, Bundi and Jhalawar styles
4. The Dhundar school of Amber, Jaipur, Shekhawati and Uniara styles of painting

=== Phad paintings ===
Phad paintings are colourful scroll paintings done on cloth, originally made to illustrate the performances of narratives by Bhopa singer/reciters. These have their own styles and patterns and are very popular due to their vibrant colors and historic themes. The Phad of God Devnarayan is largest among the popular Pars in Rajasthan. The painted area of God Devnarayan Ki Phad is 170 square feet (i.e. 34' x 5'). Some other Pars are also prevalent in Rajasthan, but being of recent origin they are not classical in composition. Another famous Par painting is Pabuji Ki Phad. Pabuji Ki Phad is painted on a 15 x 5 ft. canvas. Other famous heroes of Phad paintings are Gogaji, Prithviraj Chauhan, Amar Singh Rathore etc.

== Gallery ==
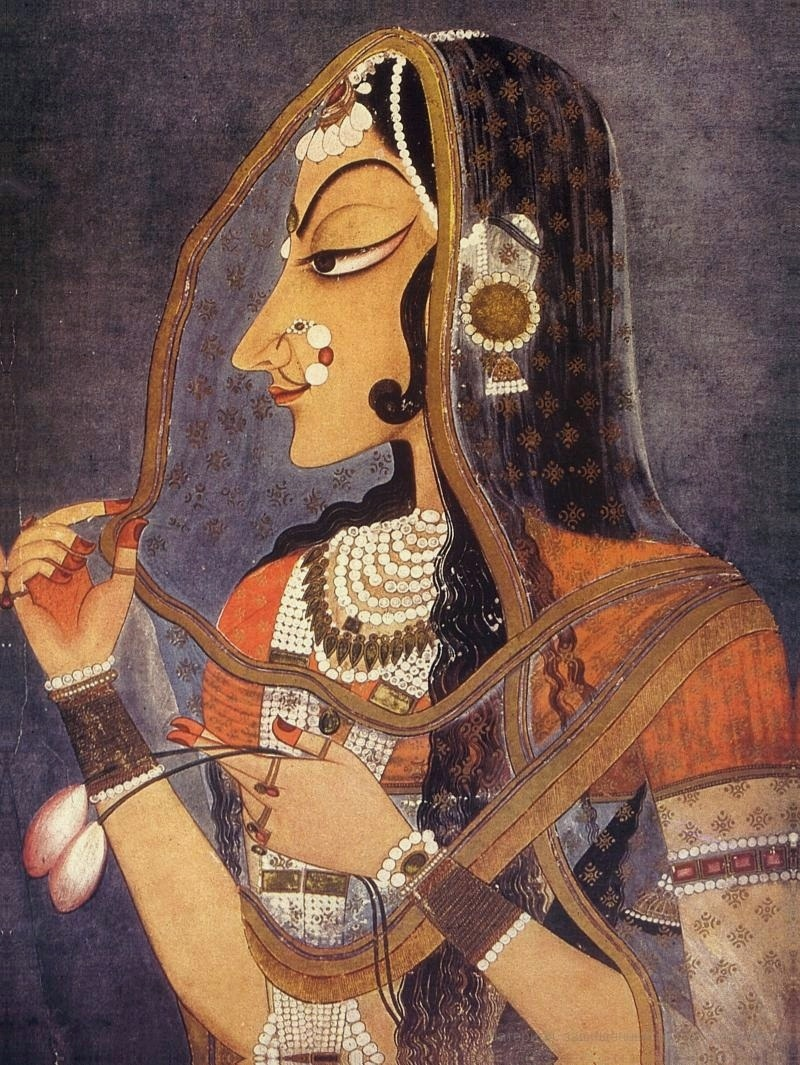
Bani Thani painting

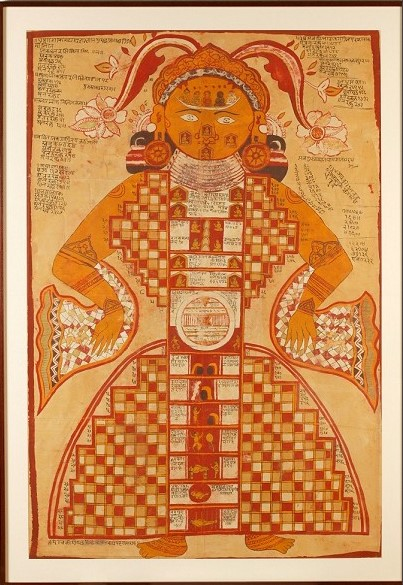
Purushkara Yantra, 18th century

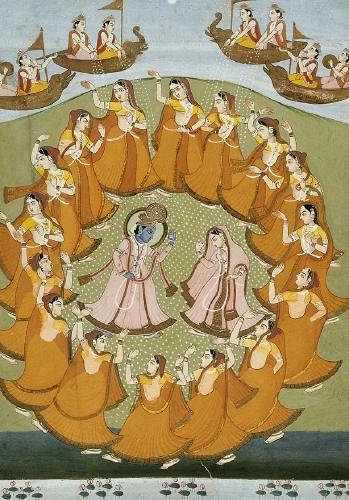
Radha Krishna dancing Raslila with Gopis, 19th century
