= Kharai =

Kharai (Persian: خرائي) may refer to:

- Kharai-ye Bala, and Kharai-ye Pain - two neighbouring villages in Ahmadi Rural District, Iran
- Kharai, a village in the Kachchh district, Gujarat, India.
- Kharai, a breed of camels found in India

== See also ==
- Matta Kharai, in Pakistan.
