= Shree Lal Joshi =

Indian artist (1931–2018)

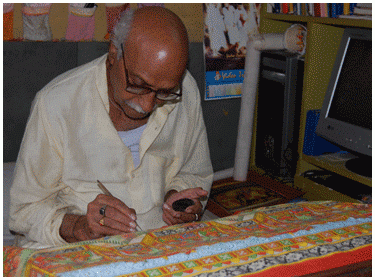
- Born: 5 March 1931; Shahpura, Bhilwara District
- Died: 2 March 2018 (aged 86)

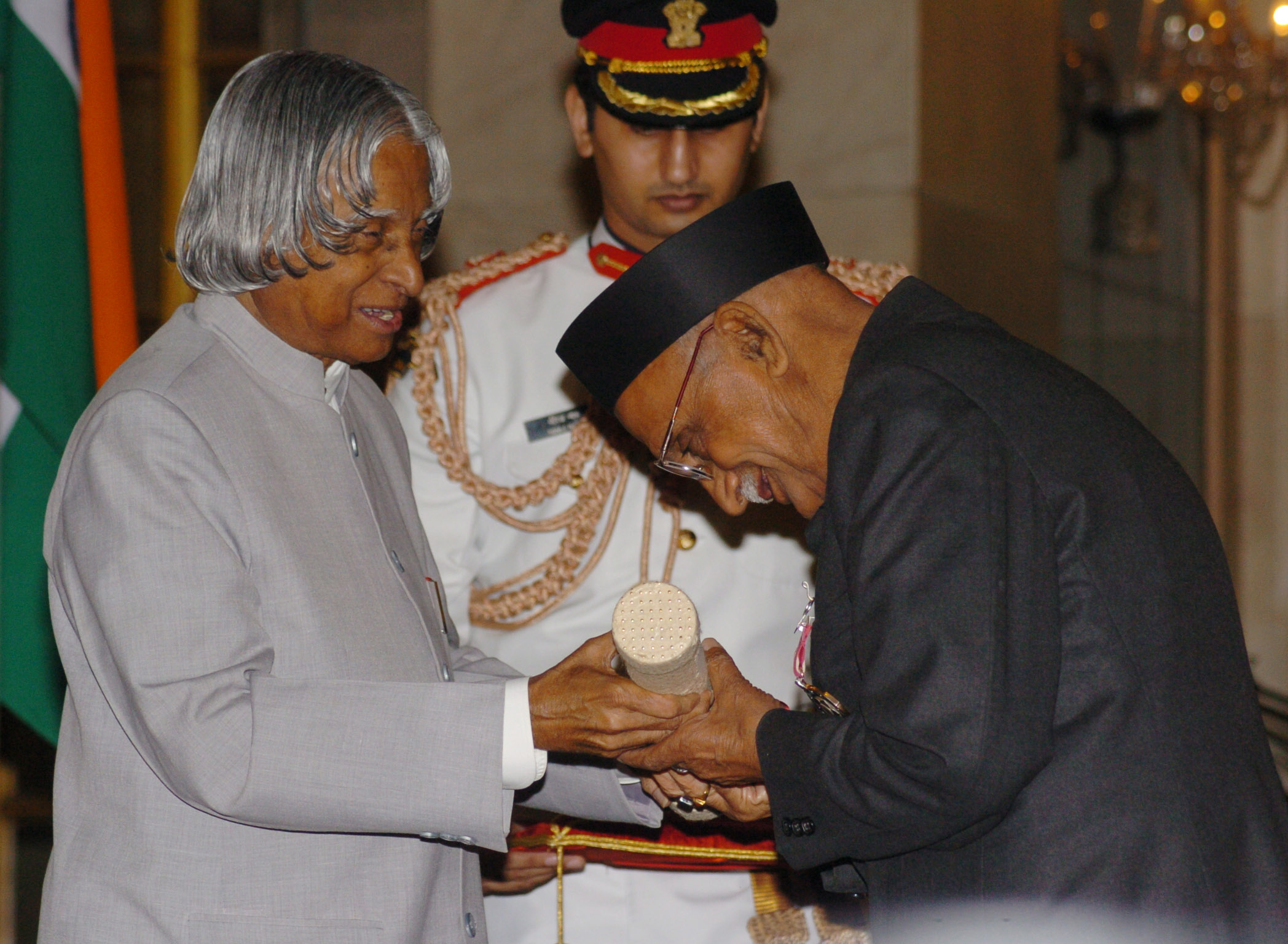
The President, Dr. A.P.J. Abdul Kalam presenting Padma Shri to Shri Shreelal Joshi, for his pioneer work in the art of phad painting, at an Investiture Ceremony at Rashtrapati Bhavan in New Delhi on March 29, 2006

Shree Lal Joshi (5 March 1931 – 2 March 2018) was an Indian Chippa caste artist of phad painting, a form of popular folk painting of Rajasthan.

== Life ==
Joshi was born on 5 March 1931 at Shahpura in Bhilwara district in a family widely known as the traditional artists of phad painting for the last few centuries. His father Ramchandra Joshi initiated him into this traditional art at the age of 13. He discovered many new techniques and painted quite original and meaningful compositions. He was also renowned for his fresco-style wall paintings as well as Phad. He received the National Award for his Wall Painting at Crafts Museum, New Delhi. Elephant, horses, lions, and women with pitchers on their heads were the usual motifs of his painting.

To begin with his experimentation, he introduced and composed small phad paintings with new themes for this traditional art-form based on the episodes of the Devnarayan Mahagatha, the battle of Haldighati and the jauhar (self-immolation) of Padmini, the lives of Maharana Pratap, Prithvi Raj Chouhan, Rani Hadi, Padmini, Dhola Maru, Amar Singh Rathore, Buddha, Mahavira and the narratives from the Gitagovindam, the Ramayana, the Mahabharata and the Kumarasambhava. Tukras (Small pieces) paintings were introduced by him. Apart from the Bhopas, the traditional phad singer-priests, buyers of his works include the art connoisseurs, tourists, private and Government emporia and private art galleries. His works have been also found in the collections of various museums, which include National Museum, Indira Gandhi National Art Museum, National Craft Museum and Sanskriti Museum in New Delhi, Hare Krishna Museum, Kurushetra, Bhartia Lok Kala Mandal, Udaipur, Jawahar Kala Kendra, Jaipur, Linden Museum, Germany, Leforet Museum, Japan, Albert Museum, London, Landes Museum, Austria, Smith Sonian Museum, Washington, Syracuse University, USA Etenografisca Museum, Stockholm, and also in the museums of Singapore, Germany, Netherlands and France.

His sons, Kalyan and Gopal are also notable artists of this art form. Kalyan Joshi's phad paintings are now adorning prime minister Narendra Modi's office walls.

== Awards and honours ==
A long association with Komal Kothari, Kapila Vatsyayan and Jyotindra Jain inspired Joshi to experiment and innovate. He earned many international and national awards. He received the Padma Shri award in 2006 and the Shilpaguru award (2007). The Government of India issued a Rs. 5/- postal stamp on his famous creation- Phad of Shri Devnarayan.

=== International Awards ===
- SAARC International Award, Islamabad
- Black Magician Award, German Festival, Stuttgart

=== National Awards ===
- National Merit Award, New Delhi, 1969,'72,'74
- National Award, 1984
- Silver Award, Bhartiya Lok Kala Mandal, 1979
- Kala Shree Award, Haryana Government, 1989
- Bhuwalka Public Welfare Award, Marudhara Institute, Calcutta, 1994
- Padma Shri Award, New Delhi, 2006
- Sangeet Shyamla Award, Kolkata, 2007
- Shilpaguru Award, 2007

== Documentaries on his works ==
- "The Folklore" by Mani Kaul
- "Phad Painting & Shri Lal Joshi" by Lalit Kala Academy
- "Painted Epics of Rajasthan" by Door Darshan
- "Twenty four Bagrwat Bros. & Lord Dev narayan" by J.C. Miller
- "Phad Paintings of Rajasthan" by BBC.

== See also ==
- Devnarayan Ki Phad
- Pabuji Ki Phad
