= Pabuji (disambiguation) =

Pabuji is an Indian folk-deity.

Pabuji may also refer to:

- Pabuji Ki Phad, a religious scroll painting
- Kolu Pabuji, a village in Rajasthan, India
