= Gishab =

Village in Hormozgan, Iran

Gishab گيشاب
- Village
- Location within Iran
- Coordinates: 28°17′07″N 56°50′18″E
- Country: Iran
- Province: Hormozgan
- County: Hajjiabad
- Bakhsh: Ahmadi
- Rural District: Kuh Shah

Population (2006)
  - Total: 165
- Time zone: UTC+3:30 (IRST)
  - Summer (DST): UTC+4:30 (IRDT)

Gishab (Persian: گيشاب, also Romanized as Gīshāb) is a village in Kuh Shah Rural District, Ahmadi District, Hajjiabad County, Hormozgan Province, Iran. At the 2006 census, its population was 165, in 43 families.
