= Jaer =

Jaer جاعر
- Village
- Location within Iran
- Coordinates: 28°00′09″N 56°50′47″E
- Country: Iran
- Province: Hormozgan
- County: Hajjiabad
- Bakhsh: Ahmadi
- Rural District: Kuh Shah

Population (2006)
  - Total: 64
- Time zone: UTC+3:30 (IRST)
  - Summer (DST): UTC+4:30 (IRDT)

Jaer (Persian: جاعر, also Romanized as Jā’er) is a village in Kuh Shah Rural District, Ahmadi District, Hajjiabad County, Hormozgan Province, Iran. At the 2006 census, its population was 64, in 19 families.
