= Chah Morgh =

Chah Morgh چاه مرغ
- Village
- Location within Iran
- Coordinates: 27°56′50″N 56°34′31″E
- Country: Iran
- Province: Hormozgan
- County: Hajjiabad
- Bakhsh: Ahmadi
- Rural District: Ahmadi

Population (2006)
  - Total: 54
- Time zone: UTC+3:30 (IRST)
  - Summer (DST): UTC+4:30 (IRDT)

Chah Morgh (Persian: چاه مرغ, also Romanized as Chāh Morgh) is a village in Ahmadi Rural District, Ahmadi District, Hajjiabad County, Hormozgan Province, Iran. At the 2006 census, its population was 54, in 10 families.
