= Ban Gowd-e Ahmadi =

Ban Gowd-e Ahmadi بنگوداحمدي
- Village
- Location within Iran
- Coordinates: 27°58′08″N 56°40′38″E
- Country: Iran
- Province: Hormozgan
- County: Hajjiabad
- Bakhsh: Ahmadi
- Rural District: Ahmadi

Population (2006)
  - Total: 554
- Time zone: UTC+3:30 (IRST)
  - Summer (DST): UTC+4:30 (IRDT)

Ban Gowd-e Ahmadi (Persian: بنگوداحمدي, also Romanized as Ban Gowd-e Aḩmadī) is a village in Ahmadi Rural District, Ahmadi District, Hajjiabad County, Hormozgan Province, Iran. At the 2006 census, its population was 554, in 128 families.
