= Marzan Dar =

Marzan Dar مرزان در
- Village
- Location within Iran
- Coordinates: 28°13′06″N 56°57′41″E
- Country: Iran
- Province: Hormozgan
- County: Hajjiabad
- Bakhsh: Ahmadi
- Rural District: Kuh Shah

Population (2006)
  - Total: 103
- Time zone: UTC+3:30 (IRST)
  - Summer (DST): UTC+4:30 (IRDT)

Marzan Dar (Persian: مرزان در, also Romanized as Marzān Dar) is a village in Kuh Shah Rural District, Ahmadi District, Hajjiabad County, Hormozgan Province, Iran. At the 2006 census, its population was 103, in 29 families.
