= Shaqrud =

Shaqrud شقرود
- Village
- Location within Iran
- Coordinates: 27°52′58″N 56°48′10″E
- Country: Iran
- Province: Hormozgan
- County: Hajjiabad
- Bakhsh: Ahmadi
- Rural District: Ahmadi

Population (2006)
  - Total: 68
- Time zone: UTC+3:30 (IRST)
  - Summer (DST): UTC+4:30 (IRDT)

Shaqrud (Persian: شقرود, also Romanized as Shaqrūd; also known as Shaghrood, Shaqar Rūd, and Shaqrūr) is a village in Ahmadi Rural District, Ahmadi District, Hajjiabad County, Hormozgan Province, Iran. At the 2006 census, its population was 68, in 18 families.
