= Khan-e Guran =

Khan-e Guran خان گوران
- Village
- Location within Iran
- Coordinates: 27°55′31″N 56°38′48″E
- Country: Iran
- Province: Hormozgan
- County: Hajjiabad
- Bakhsh: Ahmadi
- Rural District: Ahmadi

Population (2006)
  - Total: 40
- Time zone: UTC+3:30 (IRST)
  - Summer (DST): UTC+4:30 (IRDT)

Khan-e Guran (Persian: خان گوران, also Romanized as Khān-e Gūrān; also known as Khāneh-ye Gūrān and Khūn-e Gūrān) is a village in Ahmadi Rural District, Ahmadi District, Hajjiabad County, Hormozgan Province, Iran. At the 2006 census, its population was 40, in 9 families.
