= Pur, Iran =

Village in Hormozgan province, Iran

Pur Persian: پور
- Village
- Location within Iran
- Coordinates: 27°58′20″N 56°46′18″E
- Country: Iran
- Province: Hormozgan
- County: Hajjiabad
- District: Ahmadi
- Rural District: Kuh-e Shah

Population (2016)
  - Total: 366
- Time zone: UTC+3:30 (IRST)

Pur (Persian: پور) (Note: Also romanized as Poor and Pūr; also known as Pūr Aḩmadī) is a village in, and the capital of, Kuh-e Shah Rural District of Ahmadi District, Hajjiabad County, Hormozgan province, Iran.

== Demographics ==
=== Population ===
At the time of the 2006 National Census, the village's population was 311 in 89 households. The following census in 2011 counted 266 people in 83 households. The 2016 census measured the population of the village as 366 people in 127 households.
