= Kharai-ye Pain =

Kharai-ye Pain خرائي پائين
- Village
- Location within Iran
- Coordinates: 27°54′27″N 56°42′03″E
- Country: Iran
- Province: Hormozgan
- County: Hajjiabad
- Bakhsh: Ahmadi
- Rural District: Ahmadi

Population (2006)
  - Total: 86
- Time zone: UTC+3:30 (IRST)
  - Summer (DST): UTC+4:30 (IRDT)

Kharai-ye Pain (Persian: خرائي پائين, also Romanized as Kharā’ī-ye Pā’īn; also known as Kharā’ī) is a village in Ahmadi Rural District, Ahmadi District, Hajjiabad County, Hormozgan Province, Iran. At the 2006 census, its population was 86, in 20 families.
