= Mazgerd =

Village in Hormozgan province, Iran

Mazgerd Persian: مازگرد
- Village
- Location within Iran
- Coordinates: 27°59′24″N 56°57′37″E
- Country: Iran
- Province: Hormozgan
- County: Hajjiabad
- District: Ahmadi
- Rural District: Kuh-e Shah

Population (2016)
  - Total: 842
- Time zone: UTC+3:30 (IRST)

Mazgerd (Persian: مازگرد) (Note: Also romanized as Mazāgerd and Māzgerd; also known as Mārgaz) is a village in Kuh-e Shah Rural District of Ahmadi District, Hajjiabad County, Hormozgan province, Iran.

== Demographics ==
=== Population ===
At the time of the 2006 National Census, the village's population was 705 in 139 households. The following census in 2011 counted 760 people in 185 households. The 2016 census measured the population of the village as 842 people in 226 households. It was the most populous village in its rural district.
