= Kharai-ye Bala =

Kharai-ye Bala خرائي بالا
- Village
- Location within Iran
- Coordinates: 27°54′12″N 56°41′58″E
- Country: Iran
- Province: Hormozgan
- County: Hajjiabad
- Bakhsh: Ahmadi
- Rural District: Ahmadi

Population (2006)
  - Total: 100
- Time zone: UTC+3:30 (IRST)
  - Summer (DST): UTC+4:30 (IRDT)

Kharai-ye Bala (Persian: خرائي بالا, also Romanized as Kharā’ī-ye Bālā) is a village in Ahmadi Rural District, Ahmadi District, Hajjiabad County, Hormozgan Province, Iran. At the 2006 census, its population was 100, in 24 families.
