= Hasham Balm =

Village in Hormozgan province, Iran

Hasham Balm Persian: حشم بلم
- Village
- Location within Iran
- Coordinates: 27°57′09″N 56°41′24″E
- Country: Iran
- Province: Hormozgan
- County: Hajjiabad
- District: Ahmadi
- Rural District: Ahmadi

Population (2016)
  - Total: 331
- Time zone: UTC+3:30 (IRST)

Hasham Balm (Persian: حشم بلم) (Note: Also romanized as Ḩasham Balam, Ḩashām Balm, Ḩasham Balm, Hāshem Balm, and Ḩāshombalm; also known as Ashām Bolān and Asham Sullam) is a village in Ahmadi Rural District of Ahmadi District, Hajjiabad County, Hormozgan province, Iran.

== Demographics ==
=== Population ===
At the time of the 2006 National Census, the village's population was 440 in 103 households. The following census in 2011 counted 300 people in 81 households. The 2016 census measured the population of the village as 331 people in 101 households. It was the most populous village in its rural district.
