= Indigenous Tattoos of the Indian Subcontinent =

Tattooing has been an integral part of the cultural fabric of the Indian subcontinent for millennia. Known by various regional names such as godna in Hindi and pachakuthar in Tamil, traditional tattoos have served as markers of identity, rites of passage, spiritual symbols, and protective talismans among numerous communities, particularly tribal and rural populations.

== Historical overview ==
The origins of tattooing in the Indian subcontinent trace back to ancient times, with evidence suggesting its presence during the Indus Valley Civilization (c. 3300–1300 BCE). References to tattooing practices are also found in Vedic literature, indicating its longstanding cultural relevance. Tattooing was often associated with rites of passage, religious beliefs, and social status, varying across different regions and communities.

== Cultural significance ==
=== Tribal and caste practices ===
Among tribal communities such as the Bhil, Gond, Santhal, Baiga and Apatani, tattoos have traditionally served as markers of identity, marital status and social affiliation. For instance, Baiga women in Central India were known for extensive body tattoos, believed to be the only adornments carried into the afterlife. In certain scheduled castes, particularly in North India, facial and limb tattoos were common, symbolizing resilience and spiritual protection.

=== Religious and spiritual beliefs ===
Tattoos have held religious significance in various communities. In Hindu traditions, symbols such as the trident (trishul), Om, and depictions of deities like Shiva and Kali were commonly tattooed as expressions of devotion. Rabari women of Gujarat often bore religious symbols on their bodies as acts of piety.

In Northeast India, among the Konyak Nagas, facial tattoos were historically associated with headhunting practices, serving as indicators of valor and social status.

=== Medicinal and protective uses ===
In various rural areas, tattoos were believed to possess medicinal or protective properties. Specific designs were thought to alleviate ailments or ward off evil spirits. For example, ear tattoos (karna godna) were considered remedies for headaches and earaches.

== Regional variations ==
=== Central India ===
Tribes such as the Gond and Baiga utilized intricate designs made with natural pigments, often applied to the arms, legs, and torso. These tattoos were deeply embedded in their cultural practices and beliefs.

=== Western India ===
In Rajasthan and Gujarat, tattoo designs included geometric shapes, flora, and fauna, commonly applied to adolescent girls as part of cultural rituals. The Rabari community, in particular, practiced tattooing as a form of religious expression and social identity.

=== Northeast India ===
Tattoos among tribes like the Apatani, Wancho, and Konyak symbolized military prowess and were also used for protection against enemies. Women would tattoo their faces to safeguard against being kidnapped by other tribes.

=== South India ===
The Tamil and Telugu-speaking regions practiced pachakuthar, involving auspicious symbols tattooed during religious ceremonies. The tradition was particularly notable among devadasis and rural women.

== Tools and techniques ==
Traditional tattooing methods involved basic tools such as sharpened thorns or needles, with pigments derived from soot, ash or plant extracts. Procedures were often painful and performed without anaesthesia. The craft was typically passed down through generations of female tattooists, known as godharins.

== Decline and revival ==
Tattooing traditions declined significantly during the 20th century due to urbanization, modernization, and changing social attitudes, particularly toward visible caste and tribal identifiers. However, in recent years, there has been renewed scholarly and artistic interest in preserving and documenting indigenous tattooing practices. Contemporary tattoo artists and designers have incorporated traditional motifs into modern art, fashion, and body art, aiming to honor and reinterpret these cultural symbols.

== See also ==
- Tribal art
- Adivasi
- Tribal religions in India
