= Sundelao =

Village in Rajasthan, India

Coordinates: 25.575°N 73.072°E

Sundelao village is located in Pali Tehsil of Pali district in Rajasthan, India. It is situated 50 km away from Pali, which is both district & sub-district headquarters of Sundelao village. The total geographical area of village is 1279 hectares. Sundelao has a total population of 481 peoples. There are about 89 houses in Sundelao village.

JODHA rajputs reside here along with kumbhars, lok or choudhary, raikas or rabari a colourful tribe.
