= Vadhel =

Clan of Rajputs in India

The Vadhel (also spelled vadher) are a Rajput clan found in the state of Gujarat in India. They are an offshoot of Rathore of Marwad and claim Suryavanshi descent.

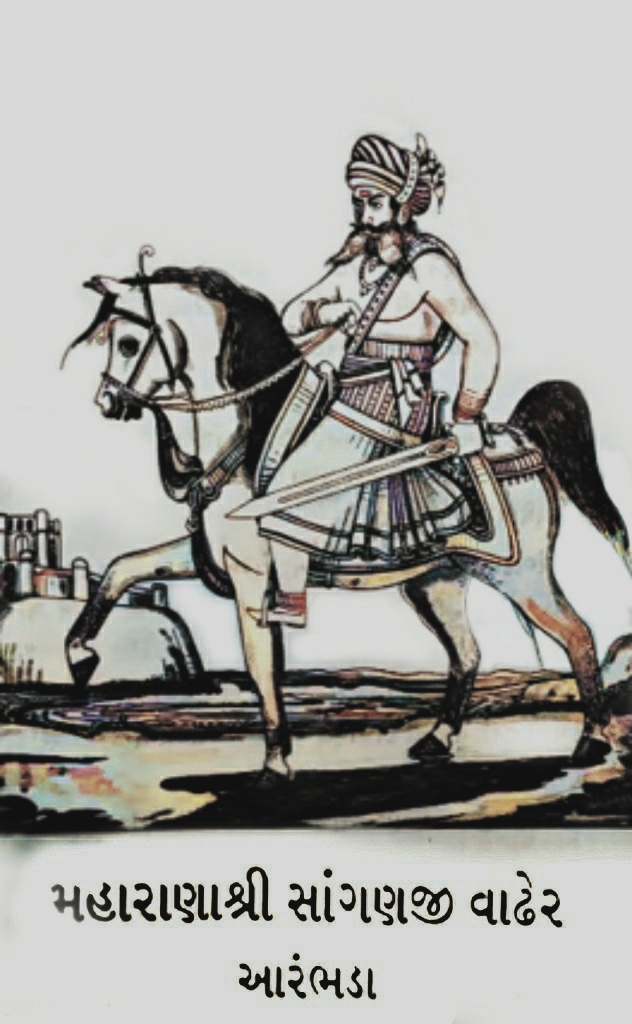
Maharanashri Sanganji Vádhel of Vadhel Dynasty

== Origin ==
About A.D. 1225 Rathore tribes of Vadhel, who are said to have been sprung from Pabuji Rathore, entered the province on the pretence of a pilgrimage to Dwarka. Here they massacred the Chavda and Harol Rajputs and seized Okhamandal.

Seoji and Saitrain, The two grandsons of Jayachandra roamed about as outlaws against the Mahomedan rule for eighteen years. They had left Kannauj the land of their birth, attended by only 200 Rajput followers. Seoji married a Solanki princess, and proceeded on a pilgrimage to the holy shrine of shri krishna at Dwarka. He established Rathore rule in Marwad. Seoji had at the time of his death, three sons,Asothma, Soning and Ajmal(Pabuji). Asothma succeeded him to the gadi, Soning conquered Idar. and Ajmal’s son Vadhelji conquered Dwarka and beyt and established Okhamandal.

== History ==
During the 13th century, Rathore Rajput brothers, Veeravaliji and Bijlaji of the Vadhel dynasty of Okhamandal reached Dwarka from Marwar. In that region, a dispute between Hiron and Chavada Rajputs was going on. The conflict ended with the victory of Rathore Rajputs and Chavadas were completely routed from the region.

Vadhels captured the surrounding territories and established a small but strong estate.Veeravalji conquered the territory till the river Vedmati near the small desert of Kutch. He established a new capital in the north of Dwarka that is at Arambhada a small settlement in the village as a centre of power. After his death Vikamsi, his son, came to power and after him nine descendants one after the other became Ranas. They all ruled for about 120 years. Among the lineage of Vikamsi, one Sanganji also came to power, and expanded his territory to Jamkhambhaliya. Sanganji had defeated Rao Mandlik by attacking the Shankhodwar Dweep. Sanganji came into conflict with the Wagheras of Manik Avantak, this had become quite regular therefore he signed a treaty that Okhamandal that it shall be ruled by Vadhelas and Wagheras shall rule on Dwarka.He also made this kind of an agreement that both of them should remain in harmony, so that their strongest enemy could never destroy them. Since then both the tribes have been living together. After Sanganji, his son Bhimji came to power. During the reign of Bhimji's, Mahmud Baghera attacked his territory on the behest to check the looting pirates due to its proximity with Dwarka and defeated Bhimji, eventually establishing Muslim rule in the region.

== War with Mahumd Begda and Raizadas ==
Conquest of Okha, in 1480, during these eight years in addition to the conquest of Okhamandal, Sanganji stopped Begada's chieftains and defeated Ra Mandlika twice, after the death of Sanganji Vadhel around A.D. 1480 the Sultan heard of the Vadhel chief Bhim of Okha, an attack on Mullah Muhammad Samarkandi, who implored Mahmud in person to avenge his wrongs. The Sultan accordingly marched to Jagat, took the fort, and destroyed the temples. Then he conquered the island of Shankhodwar, the modern Bet, and after building a mosque at Jagat returned, leaving the government of the country in the hands of Farhat-ul-Mulk. According to the Mirat-i-Sikandari this was the first time that Dwarka had been conquered by the Muhammadans. The Vadhel chieftain Bhim was taken prisoner and sent to Ahmadabad, and the governor Muhafiz Khan was directed to hew him in pieces and affix a portion of him to each gate of the city, and this was accordingly done. In A.D. 1480, eight years subsequent to the conquest of Junagadh, Sultan Mahmud returned to Gujarat after the defeat of Vadhels. A son of the Mandlika was appointed jágirdár, but he was associated with a high Muslim official called the Thanahdar who commanded the garrsia.The first jagirdar was Bhupatsingh also called Melag, who was a son of Ra Mandlika. These jagirdars and their descendants, from being sons of the last Ra, were called Raizadahs to distinguish them from other Chudasama.

== See also ==
- Jadeja
- Battle of Bhuchar Mori
- Rathore
