= Sar-e Gaz-e Ahmadi =

City in Hormozgan province, Iran

Sar-e Gaz-e Ahmadi Persian: سر گز احمدي
- City
- Location within Iran
- Coordinates: 27°56′27″N 56°39′46″E
- Country: Iran
- Province: Hormozgan
- County: Hajjiabad
- District: Ahmadi

Population (2016)
  - Total: 1,157
- Time zone: UTC+3:30 (IRST)

Sar-e Gaz-e Ahmadi (Persian: سرگزاحمدي) (Note: Also romanized as Sar-e Gaz-e Aḩmadī; also known as Sar-e Gaz-e Bālā, Sargaz, and Sargaz-e Bāla) is a city in, and the capital of, Ahmadi District of Hajjiabad County, Hormozgan province, Iran. It also serves as the administrative center for Ahmadi Rural District.

== Demographics ==
=== Population ===
At the time of the 2006 National Census, Sar-e Gaz-e Ahmadi's population was 886 in 201 households, when it was a village in Ahmadi Rural District. The following census in 2011 counted 1,170 people in 316 households, by which time the village had been elevated to the status of a city. The 2016 census measured the population of the city as 1,157 people in 353 households.
