= Kharai camel =

Breed of camel

The Kharai is a breed of dromedary camel, commonly known as the 'swimming camel' due to its ability to thrive in the salt marshes of Kutch district, located in the western Indian state of Gujarat. Its name is derived from the Gujarati language word 'khara', meaning salty.

Also locally known as 'Dariyataru', these camels have earned their name due to their ability to swim in the waters of the sea. With a slow and purposeful grace, they glide effortlessly through the water, traversing up to 3 kilometers in the shallow seas to reach their grazing grounds – the mangroves of the neighbouring region.

The Kharai camels are closely associated with the Rabari and Fakirani Jat communities, two local and traditional tribes who have owned and managed these camels for generations. As nomadic pastoralists, these tribes have developed a symbiotic relationship with the Kharai camels, characterized by mutual dependence and understanding of the animals' needs and habits.

== Breed recognition ==
The Kharai camel has been officially recognized as a distinct breed by the National Bureau of Animal Genetic Resources (NBAGR) located at Karnal, Haryana, due to its unique habitat and dietary preferences. This recognition elevates the Kharai camel to the status of India's ninth recognized camel breed.

The nine recognised camel breeds from India are:

- Bikaneri, Rajasthan
- Jaisalmeri, Rajasthan
- Jalori, Rajasthan
- Kutchi, Gujarat
- Malvi, Madhya Pradesh
- Mewari, Rajasthan
- Mewati, Rajasthan and Haryana
- Kharai, Gujarat

== Diet ==
Unlike other camel breeds, Kharai camels have a unique dependence on mangroves for sustenance. During the monsoon season, they migrate in large numbers to neighbouring mangrove islands, where they swim and forage for food. Remarkably, they remain on these islands for extended periods, often staying for several days at a time.

== Distribution and habitat ==
Gujarat is home to approximately 4,000 Kharai camels, with a significant concentration of around 2,000 in the coastal regions of Kutch, specifically in Bhachau, Abdasa, and Lakhpat. The remaining population is distributed across Devbhoomi Dwarka and Jamnagar districts.

== Conservation ==
=== Threats ===
The Kharai camel, a distinct breed, is under threat due to the devastating impact of coastal industrialization and mangrove destruction. With their population in decline, conservation efforts are necessary to protect this vulnerable species.

== See also ==
- Dromedary
