= Devnarayan Ki Phad =

Type of cloth painting

Devnarayan Ki Par or Devnarayan Ki Phad

(Rajasthani:देवनारायण की फड़) are cloth paintings which depict the legend of Devnarayan, a medieval hero venerated as a folk-deity. Traditionally, they are used to accompany a ritual in which the heroic deeds of Devnarayan are sung or recited by priests. Devnarayan is worshipped as an incarnation of the Hindu god Vishnu, mostly in Rajasthan and Madhya Pradesh. According to the legend, he was incarnated in Vikram Samvat in 968 as the son of Sawai Bhoj Bagaravat and his wife Saadu Maata

Devnarayan Ki Par contains 335 songs in all. The entire narration, recorded in 1,200 foolscap pages, runs nearly 15,000 verse lines. A professional Bhopa must remember all these songs by heart.

== Devnarayan Ki Par ==
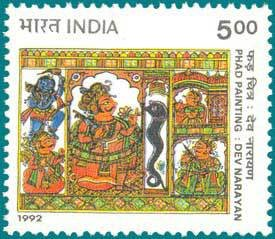
Phad Scroll Paintings from Rajasthan on Indian Postage stamp, 1992

The Par of Devnarayan is largest among the popular Pars in Rajasthan. The painted area of Devnarayan Ki Par is 170 square feet (i.e. 34' x 5'). Some other Pars are also prevalent in Rajasthan, but being of recent origin they are not classical in composition. Devnarayan Ki Par has the following attributes:

- The Devnarayan Ki Par has large and small figures. The largest of them occupy the centre and the second-largest figures are situated in the central part of the Par.
- The painting is full of many sections as well as subsections. The borders contain decorative geometrical designs.
- The depicted scenes of the Par are related to a number of events including wars, hunting, and Sati burning.
- The colors of the clothes, horses, and weapons identify the characters. Usually the faces of the figures are rigid.
- The composition of the Par can be horizontal, vertical, or curved.
- The Devnarayan Ki Par also includes figures of the Hindu gods such as Rama, Krishna, and Narsimha.
- Horses and elephants are the main carriers of the legends and followers.
- Trees and flowers also have their places in the Par but sometimes they are used just as gap fillers.
- The figure of a cow is given a special appearance. It can be clearly distinguished from other figures.
- Some faces are drawn in side poses, though sitting figures have a static form.
- The Par is painted in five colors − orange, red, grey, green, and yellow. Each color has some significance, e.g. orange signifies the human face and body, and red signifies dress.
- The standing cobra in front of a figure signifies Devnarayan who rides on Basag Nag, the king of snakes. All the male figures carry weapons such as swords, spears, and shields.

== Reading the Devnarayan Ki Par ==
The color red dominates the Devnarayan Ki Par. Reading of the Par is started from the central figure of Shri Devnarayan. For the purpose of reading, the Par can be divided in three pars. Part A extends from the left to the central figure of Lord Devnarayan. Part B begins with the figure of Devnarayan and ends with the fourth-largest figure, Devnarayan's cousin Bhangi Ji. The rest is part C. The Par reading is initiated with prayers or aarati of Lord Devnarayan and other gods such as Ganesha.

The figure of Lord Devnarayan is the largest in the Par. The central and largest figure of Lord Devnarayan is shown seated on Basag Nag (king of snakes) and the side view of Deoji has a sharp nose and prominent golden ornament. From the ear hangs a large golden ornament which most of the Brahmin still wear in Rajasthan. In one hand, there is a flower, while in the other, the Khanda (a sword).

== The Bhopa ==
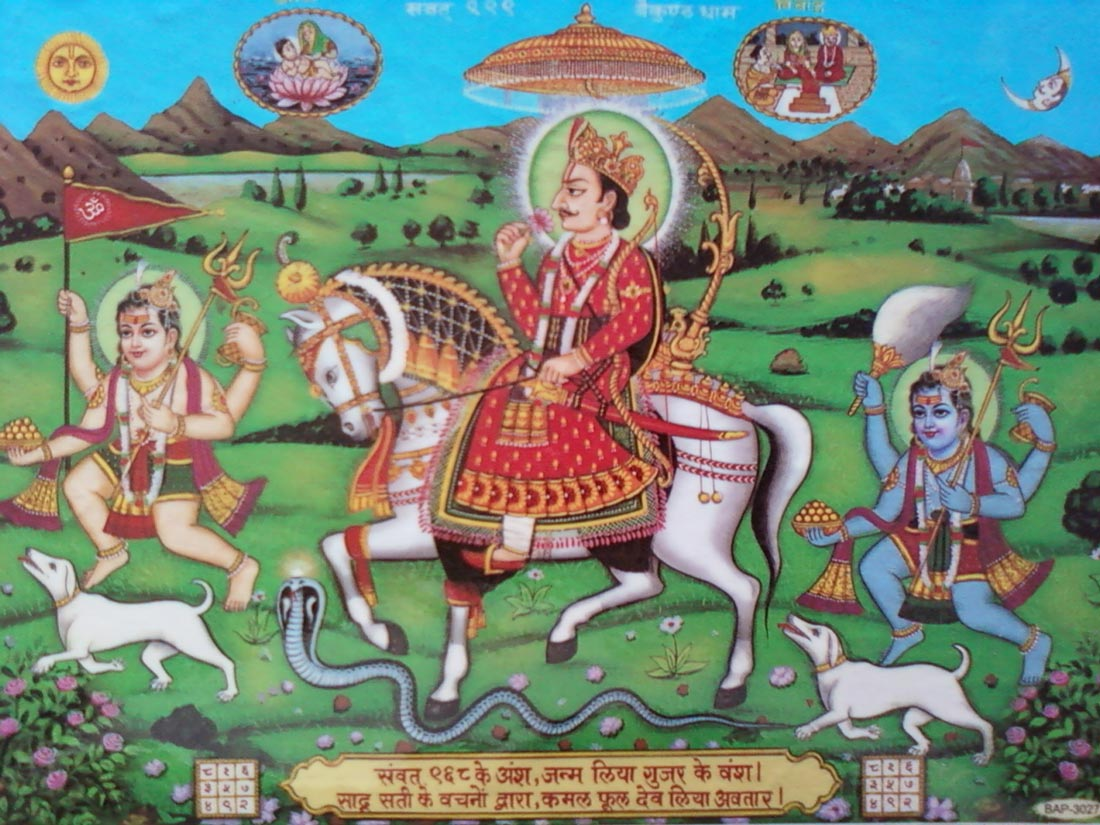
God Sri Devnarayan

Bhopa, the narrator, is the main singer who presents the Par to the audience with explanation and poetic narrations. The Bhopa use instruments such as Jantar when the Par is presented to the audience. The study of narrators and folk epics has been undertaken in other countries such as Russia and Finland. In Russia, these narrators are known as Zhiraus and Baksi. But the tradition of Par painting where Bhopas not only dance and sing but use a painting in their narration is found only in Rajasthan.

There are three types of Bhopas of the god Devnarayan. They are:

- The Temple Bhopa: The Temple Bhopa is a priest who takes care of the temple. He offers daily Puja and prayers to the God Devnarayan, preaches to believers about the religious calendar, and gives advice on religious matters. He takes care of the Pars which Par Bhopas put in the temple, to prevent any damage when they are not in use.
- The Jamat Bhopa: Among Devji's followers, only persons from the Brahmin community can join the Jamats. There are three Jamats among the Brahmin. The Jamat of Shri Sawai Bhoj, father of Lord Devnarayan, is of highest importance and enjoys more respect than any other.
- The Par Bhopa: Par Bhopas are part-time narrators and are generally found in groups of two. One of them is the Paatavi, the chief, and the other is Diyaala, the assistant, who carries a lamp. At the time of performance, the Paatavi Bhopa holds the Par and the Diyala holds the burning lamp (diya). The Par Bhopa belongs to various castes. The Par Bhopas of Devnarayan belong to the Rajput community. A few Par Bhopas live in Mavali, Mandal, and some other villages, but a majority of them reside in the Marwar area of Rajasthan, in the Nagaur district of Jodhpur division.

== Performance of the Par ==
The performance of the Par starts after sunset. The Par Bhopa sprinkles water over the ground, followed by touching it with a gold piece to make the ground holy. Usually the Par performance is done at a place where devotees of Devnarayanji reside. The Par performance is continued until dawn by the Par Bhopas. Initially only the Paatavi Bhopa sings the hymn of Devji, followed by the Diyala Bhopa. The whole epic, including the war of Bagaravats with Durjansaal and incarnation of Lord Vishnu as Shri Devnarayan, is sung by the Bhopas.

== Maintenance of the Par ==
The priests or Bhopas of the god Devnarayan are expected to know how to take care of the Par. The Bhopa offers prayers to it three times a day while playing a Jantar and lighting incense sticks. The Par of Devnarayan is kept vertical against a wall in the temple of Devji. It is not touched with unclean hands, and is only kept in holy places.

== Accessories of the Par ==
There are things which need to be kept along with the Par. These are the Baaaga (red skirt), a red jholi (peacock feather), and a bagatari. The Bhopas try to increase their knowledge pertaining to the epic of Devnarayan when they gather on some occasions. Bhopas from the Brahmin community generally gather at Pushkar, a religious place for the Brahmin and Rajput since ancient times. Priests at Pushkar Temple are only from the Rajput community. Bhopas of the god Devnarayan play an important role in promoting solidarity in the community and preserving its culture.

Another famous Par painting is Pabuji Ki Phad, though it is not as large as Devnarayanji ki Par. Pabuji Ki Phad is painted on a 15 x 5 ft. canvas.

== See also ==
- Phad painting
