= Kolu (Rajasthan) =

Kolu Kolu Pabuji
- Village
- Country: India
- State: Rajasthan
- District: Jodhpur
- Tehsil: Phalodi
- Time zone: UTC+5:30 (IST)

Kolu or Kolu Pabuji is a village in Phalodi of Jodhpur in Rajasthan. In this village folk-deity Pabuji's was born.

Kolu's nearest village is Dechu, and tehsil Phalodi is 27.1 far.
