= Phad painting =

Style of folk painting in India

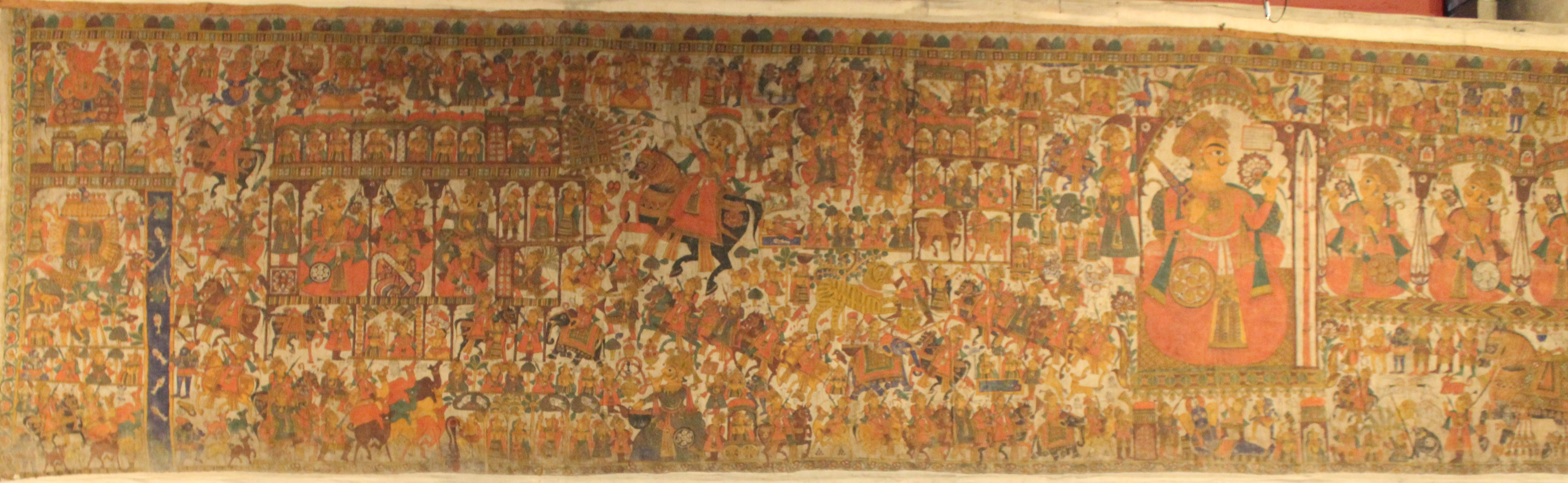
Folk-deity Pabuji in Pabuji Ki Phad, a Phad painting scroll at National Museum, New Delhi

Phad painting or phad (/pʌd/; IAST: Phad, Hindi: फड़) is a style of religious scroll painting and folk painting, practiced in Rajasthan state of India. This style of painting is traditionally done on a long piece of cloth or canvas, known as phad. The narratives of the folk deities of Rajasthan, mostly of Pabuji and Devnarayan are depicted on the phadss. The Bhopas, the priest-singers traditionally carry the painted phads along with them and use these as the mobile temples of the folk deities, who are worshipped by the Rebari community of the region. The phads of Pabuji are normally about 15 feet (4.6 m) in length, while the phads of Devnarayan are normally about 30 feet long. Traditionally the phads are painted with vegetable colors.

Traditional examples of this art are Devnarayan Ki Phad and Pabuji Ki Phad. This style was revolutionized by Shree Lal Joshi and Pradip Mukherjee about forty years ago. Mukherjee's modern version of these paintings are based on the stories of Ramcharitmanas, Gita Govinda, Kumārasambhava, Bhagavad Gita and Hanuman Chalisa. The art of Phad painting was traditionally practiced exclusively by the Joshi community. However, in 1960, Shree Lal Joshi established a school called Joshi Kala Kendra to teach this art form to everyone. Today, the school is known as Chitrashala and is located in Bhilwara city, Rajasthan.
