= Pabuji =

Ruler of Kolumad
- Predecessor: Dhandal Rathore
- Born: Bhadarwa dhooj V.S. 1405; Iktanmba ,Jodhpur
- Died: Dechu, rajsthan
- Spouse: Phulamde(Supriya de)
- Father: Dhandal Rathore , Puru
- Mother: Kamlade , Sitara bai
- Religion: Hindu

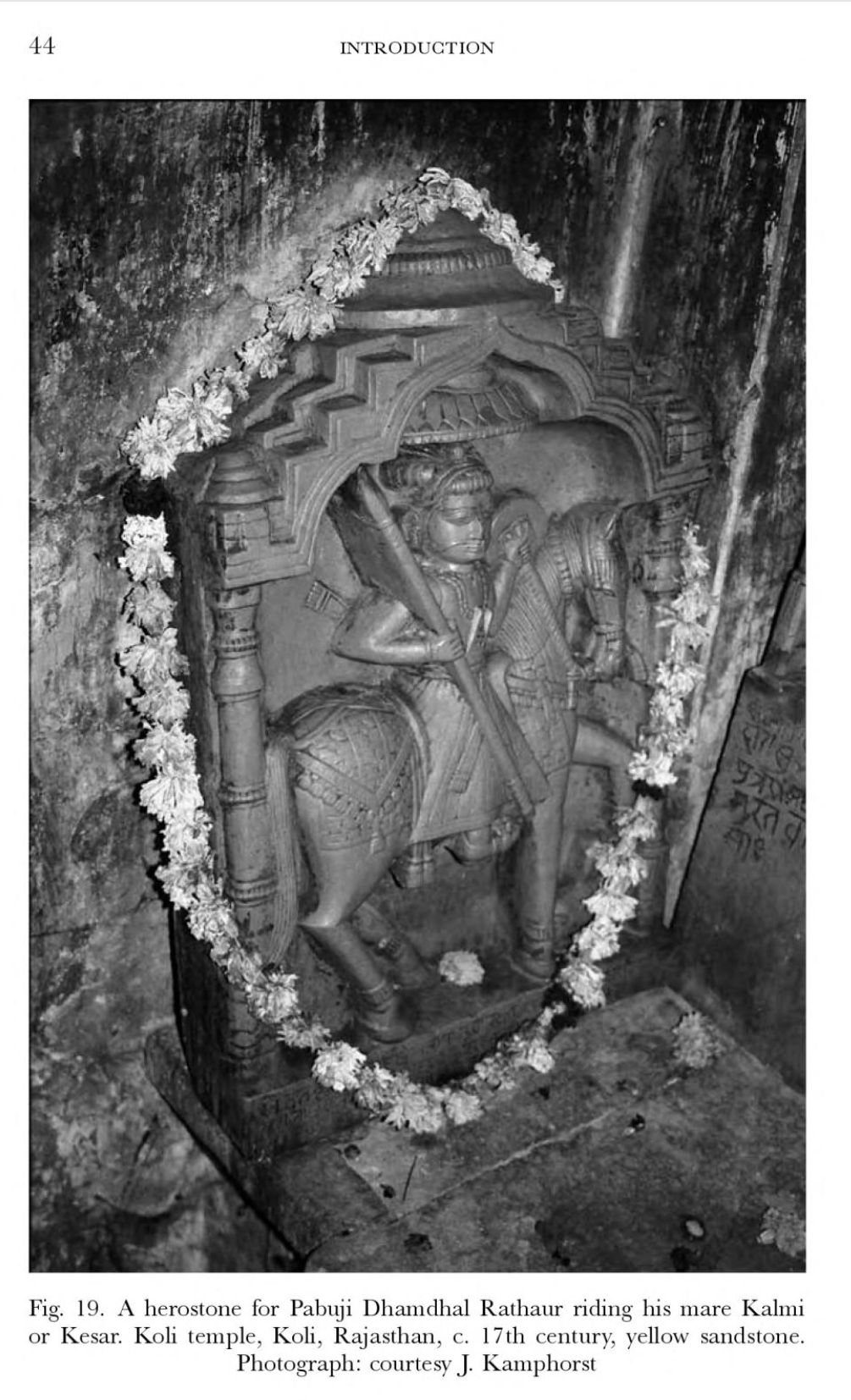
A herostone for Pabuji riding his mare Kalmi or Kesar in Koli temple, Kolis of Rajasthan, c. 17th century, yellow sandstone. Photograph by J. Kamphorst

Pabuji is a folk-deity of Rajasthan in India. Pabuji is worshiped in historical region of Rajputana.

== The Narrative of Pabuji ==
The narrative of Pabuji is sung by the Bhopa poet-singers community is based according to the tradition on a text, the Pabuprakasa. This text, according to the Bhopas consists of number of episodes of two different types, parvaros and sayls. The narrative of Pabuji is found in the Nainsi ri Khyat (17th century) under the title Vata Pabujiri.

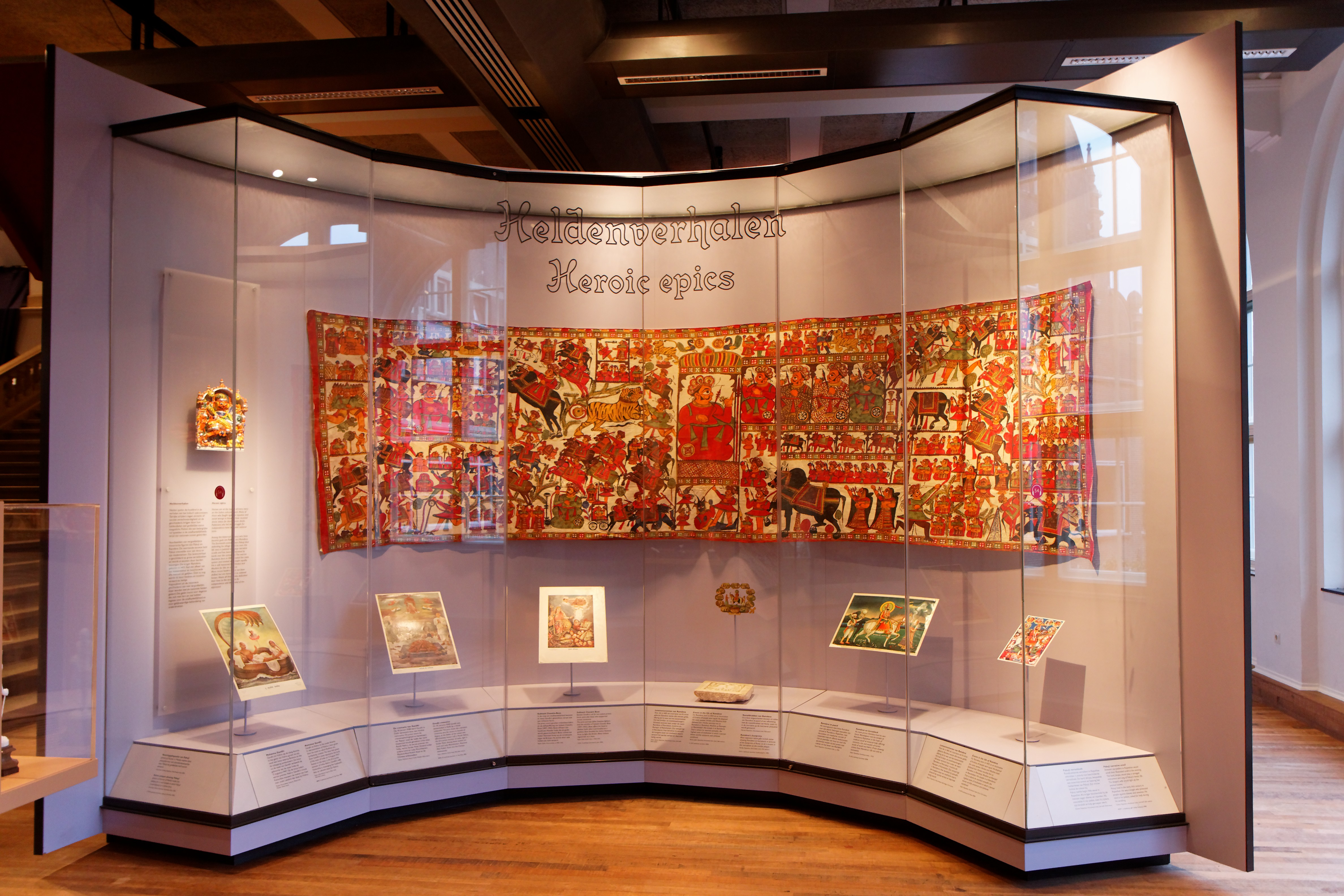
A panoramic view of the Pabhuji Ki Phad displayed in the Wereldmuseum, Amsterdam, Netherlands

=== Episodes of Pabuji ===
"Dhandal Rathore", a Rajput had four children, two sons ("Buro" and "Pabuji") and two daughters ("Sonalbai" and "Pemalbai"). When he died, both his sons set up court in their village of Kolu; but Pabuji was a god incarnate, born not from Dhandal's wife but from a celestial nymph who had promised him that when he was twelve years old she would return to him in the form of a mare for him to ride. He had four companions: "Chando"(chandrasen) and "Dhebo"(dharmveer), two brothers of whom "Dhebo" was a colossus with an insatiable appetite for food, drink and opium, and immensely aggressive; "Salji Solanki" the augurer; and "Harmal" the Rabari herdsman.

Pabuji's first exploit was to fight the Khinchi subclan of the Chauhan Rajputs, who were encroaching on his borders and treating him and Buro arrogantly. In the course of the fight "Jindrao Khinchi"'s father was killed. To try to prevent a blood-feud, "Pabuji" and "Buro" gave their sister "Pema" to "Jindrao Khinchi" in marriage. But "Jindrao Khinchi" remained hostile, and this hostility was brought to a head when "Pabuji" secured from "Deval" (a Charan lady and an incarnation of the Goddess), the fine black mare called "Kesar Kalami", on whom "Jindrao Khinchi" had set his heart. The mare was, of course, "Pabuji"'s mother who was returned to him. In exchange for the mare, "Pabuji" promised to protect "Deval" from "Jindrao Khinchi"'s raids.

"Pabuji" set off on his exploits: he overthrew "Mirza Khan", a cow-killing Muslim ruler of Patan, and then went to bathe in the holy lake of Pushkar to cleanse himself of the sin of bloodshed. Whilst he was bathing his foot slipped, and he was saved from drowning by the snake-god baba "Gogaji Chauhan". As a show of gratitude, "Pabuji" offered him the hand of his niece "Kelam", "Buro"'s daughter, and Gogaji accepted. But "Kelam"'s parents were fiercely opposed to any such wedding, and so "Pabuji" set up a subterfuge instead. At his instigation, "Gogaji" turned himself into a venomous snake and concealed himself in the garden; and when "Kelam" came there to swing he bit her on the little finger. The curers were unable to do anything for her, but "Pabuji" said that she could be cured by tying on her arm an amulet in "Gogaji"'s name, provided that she was then married to him. The cure worked and the wedding had to go ahead.

During the wedding-ceremony various people gave costly presents to Kelam; when his turn came, "Pabuji" said, "I shall plunder she-camels from urban the demon king of Lanka(arban) to give you. Everyone laughed, for camels were then unknown in Rajasthan and Lanka was known to be impregnable. And when "Kelam" reached her husband's home her in-laws taunted her mercilessly. So she sent a letter to "Pabuji" imploring him to carry out his promise. He sent one of his men, "Harmal Dewasi", to Lanka to reconnoitre; and "Harmal", disguised as a jogi (Hindu holy man), managed to get the information they needed, and also obtained physical evidences of the she-camels, all this despite being mistrusted and ill-treated by the inhabitants of Lanka. Then he returned to Kolu with his news, and they all set off to raid Lanka. They crossed the sea by "Pabuji"'s power and rounded up "arban"'s she-camels; then they did battle with Ravana and his army and defeated them, "Pabuji" himself killing "arban" with his spear.

On their way to give the captured she-camels to Kelam they had to pass through Umarkot in Sindh(Pakistan), and here the Sodha princess "Phulvanti" saw "Pabuji" and fell in love with him. "Pabuji" continued on his way: he triumphed in an encounter with "Devnarayan", and was soon able to hand over the she-camels to a delighted "Kelam" and return home to Kolu. But now he received a wedding-proposal from "Phulvanti"'s father. At first he tried to avoid it, and even when he capitulated and accepted it he caused further delay by insisting that saffron be obtained to dye the garments of the men who travelled in his wedding-procession—which resulted in an all-out war with "Lakkhu Pathan", the owner of the saffron. But at last he set off back to Umarkot to be married. "Deval", to whom he had promised his protection, stopped him on the way and tried to persuade him to stay, or at least to leave some of his men behind, but he refused, promising that if she needed him he would come instantly, even if he were sitting inside the wedding-pavilion. Then the wedding-procession started off once more, but as they travelled they observed numbers of bad omens, culminating in a tiger which "Dhebo" killed. They reached Umarkot, and the preparations for the wedding went ahead smoothly; but before the ceremony itself was even complete "Deval" arrived in the form of a bird to say that "Khinchi" had stolen her cattle.

"Pabuji" insisted on abandoning the wedding in order to ride in pursuit: he severed the bridal knot with his sword, and gave his bride a parrot which would tell her what became of him. He rode back to Kolu with his men, and after some slight delay set out in pursuit of the "Khinchis", leaving only "Dhebo" behind asleep. "Deval" woke "Dhebo" up and sent him out too, and he soon overtook "Pabuji", for when his horse tired from endless galloping, he picked it up and put it under his arm and ran on. Then disaster befell him. Vultures began to circle over him, and he as usual told them to be patient ("I shall satiate you with the vital organs of the Khinchis!"); but these vultures were not content, and told him that they wished to eat his own flesh. "Dhebo" was a man of such noble character that he could refuse no request, so he disembowelled himself for the birds. Then he drew his belt tight, and rode on; and soon he caught up with "Khinchi". Single-handed he destroyed "Khinchi"'s whole army, until only "Khinchi" himself was left alive, and he was about to kill him too when "Pabuji", who had arrived on the battlefield, stayed his hand: "If you kill him you make my sister Pema a widow." They freed "Khinchi", and set off to give "Deval" back her cattle. On the way, when "Pabuji" offered "Dhebo" some opium, "Dhebo" revealed that he was disembowelled, and died.

"Pabuji" and his remaining men now returned the cattle to "Deval", but she kept making objections: first she said her favourite bull-calf was missing—but it was discovered inside "Dhebo"'s opium-box, where he had put it as a joke; then she complained that her cattle were thirsty and told "Pabuji" to water them—but when he tried to do so he found that all the water in the well had been swallowed on "Deval"'s instructions by a genie named "Susiyo Pir". He struck the genie through the head with his spear and watered the cattle; but by the time he had finished doing all this "Khinchi" had been able to enlist the support of his uncle "Jaisingh Bhati", and was riding on Kolu with a Bhati army. There was a great battle, in which "Pabuji" and "Khinchi" came face to face. "Pabuji" said, "Khinchi, take my sword and give me your whip: my body cannot fall to a blow from your sword." They exchanged weapons, but at first "Khinchi" did nothing; so "Pabuji" goaded him into fury by whipping him, and "Khinchi" struck back at him with the sword. Instantly, a palanquin came from heaven and took "Pabuji" away with his mare. After this, "Pabuji"'s men were wiped out quickly, the last to fall being "Buro", who had his head cut off by "Khinchi".

"Buro"'s wife had a terrible dream in which she saw the massacre of the Rathores; and when she awoke the news was confirmed by the camel-rider "Harmal Dewasi", who brought her the turban of her dead husband. Similarly in Umarkot, "Phulvanti" heard the news from her parrot, which then died. Then all the women prepared to become satis (i.e. to follow their husbands into death by mounting the funeral pyre). But "Buro"'s widow was advanced in pregnancy, and before becoming a sati she took a knife and cut out from her body a male child. She named him "Rupnath", and had him sent to her mother's home in Girnar to be looked after.

"Rupnath" grew up in ignorance of his origins, but one day when he was twelve years old he encountered "Deval", and persuaded her to tell him the truth. Then he was consumed by desire to take revenge on "Khinchi". In the disguise of a holy man ("Gogaji Chauhan") he went to "Khinchi"'s place, and his aunt "Pema" ("Khinchi"'s wife) told him how to avoid the traps and savage animals with which "Khinchi" guarded himself. He was successful in doing this, and thus came into the room where "Khinchi" was asleep. He awoke him, told him who he was, and then beheaded him. "Pema" helped her nephew escape, and asked him for her husband's head, for her to commit Sati with. After playing with the head, "Rupnath" kicks "Khinchi"'s head back to "Pema". After killing "Khinchi", "Rupnath" becomes a sage and meditates for the rest of his days.

== Shrines ==
Pabuji Maharaj Raan Bhumi at Kolu, 25 km south of Phalodi off State Highway SH25, is the main shrine and the site of Pabuji's martyrdom where Pabuji was killed by Jindrav Khinchi. There are numerous shrines of Pabuji in Rajasthan, as well as in the neighbouring states in India and in Sindh in Pakistan.

Pabuji Ki Phad, housed in Wereldmuseum Amsterdam in Europe, is a religious scroll painting of folk deities in Phad painting style narrating the epic of Pabuji.

== See also ==
- List of Rajputs
- Bhopa, priest-singer of folk deities and Pabuji is one of the folk deity
- Pabuji Ki Phad, scroll painting of Pabyji
- Vadhel, subclan of Rathore Rajputs
