= Pabuji Ki Phad =

Hindu scroll paintings of folk deities

Pabhuji Ki Phad
- Bhil tribals
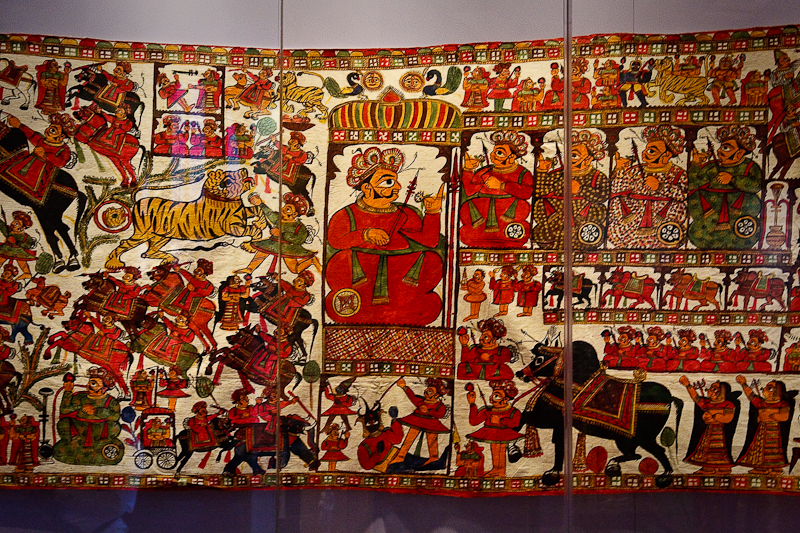
- Affiliation: Hinduism
- Abode: Rajasthan
- Texts: Epic story of Pabuji
- Region: Rajasthan

Pabuji Ki Phad is a religious scroll painting of folk deities, which is used for a musical rendition of the only surviving ancient traditional folk art form, Phad painting in the world of the epic of Pabuji. Bhopas of Pabusar are the bards and also priests who are the traditional narrators of this art form. The Phad is also spelt as "Par". This art form is popular in the Indian state of Rajasthan. Literally, 'Pabuji Ki Phad' translates into two versions namely, "The Screen of Pabuji or O, Read of Pabuji!. Pabuji is also known as "the Ascetic Deity of Sand Desert".

The three basic features associated with this art form are: the epic story of Pabuji, the Rathore chief of Rajasthan in the 13th century, who is extolled as an incarnation of Hindu God, and worshipped by the Bhil tribals of Rajasthan; the Phad or Par, which is a long scroll painting (or sewn) made on cloth, with the martial heroics of Pabuji richly displayed for worship; and the bard priests, known as the Bhopas (who belong to the cult of Pabuji) of the nomadic tribe of Nayakas and specialists in narrating the story of the Pabuji in their sartorial best through the medium of the Phads used as a portable temple, all over the desert lands of the Thar in Rajasthan.

== Legend ==
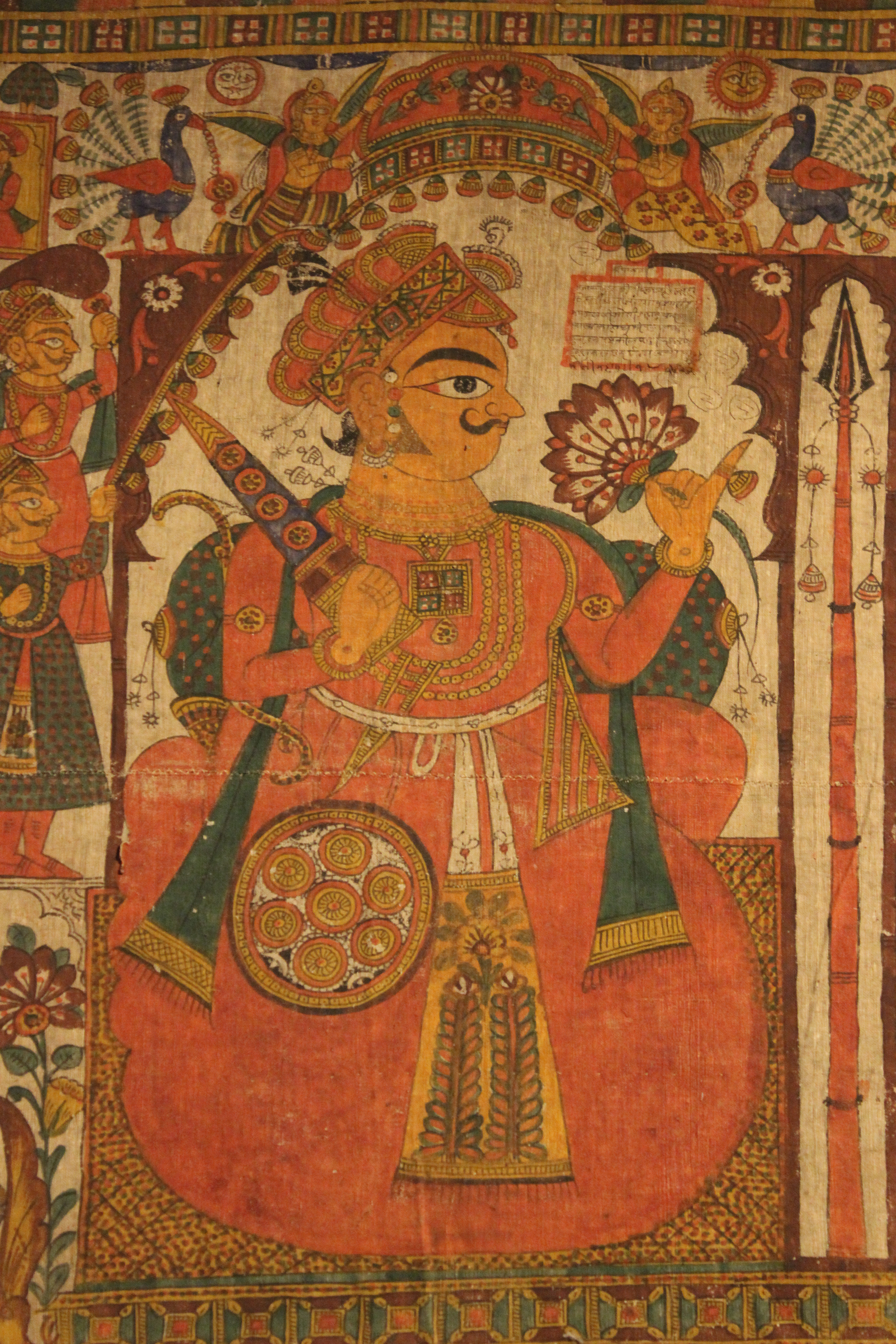
Folk-deity Pabuji in Pabuji Ki Phad, a Phad painting at National Museum, New Delhi

Pabuji is worshipped as a folk-deity. He lived in the 14th century (the 16th century is also mentioned) in a remote village known as Kulu in Rajasthan. Dhadal Rathore of village Kolu had four children: two boys, Buro the older and Pabuji the younger brother, and two girls, Sona and Pema. However, Pabuji was stated to be born to a nymph and as foretold by the nymph she was to return after 12 years as a mare to be with him. In his young age, Pabuji fought against the Khici clan to evict them from his land that they had encroached and killed their leader, Jindrav Khinchi. During this period, he also acquired a black horse from Lady Daval (goddess worshipped in Kolu) of Charan Clan and it is believed that this horse was in the reborn form of his own mother. He then went on to defeat Mirza Khan who was indulging in the killing of cows, which are held sacred by the Hindus and Muslim plunderer named Muslim marauder Mirza Khan Patan and also protected honour of the womenfolk.

An eventful part of Pabuji’s life was the marriage of Kelam, his favourite niece, to his friend, the snake deity of Rajasthan, known as Gogaji. At this wedding, while the wedding guests presented the couple with rich gifts (such as diamonds, pearls, an exquisite dress made from best cloth of South India, white cows, horses, elephants and so forth), Pabuji only promised her camels from Lanka (Lanka referred here is not the island of Sri Lanka, but refers to a kingdom west of the Indus River). He then went in search of a herd of camels to Lanka. After fighting and defeating the local ruler Ravana of Lanka, he then brought the herd of camels for his niece. When he was returning with the camels, he passed through Umarkot in Sindh (now in Pakistan). There, he fell in love with the princess Pulvati and after lot of persuasion married her.

The Kulu village where Pabu was born, now has only two conventional but small temples within a courtyard, where Puja (worship) is offered to the Pabuji. This village was known as the "great village fortress of Kolu" and it included the shrine of goddess Daval. The deity has still not attained the status for universal worship through building of many other temples elsewhere. Hence, only small shrines and commemorative stones are found in and around Kolu. Another reason attributed to the inadequate representation in the form of many temples to Pabuji is that the Bhopas are semi-nomadic and a traveling group who are not rooted to one place where they could build a temple for daily worship. Rabaris, also a semi-nomadic tribe and who are cattle herders of the region also revere Pabuji and consider it as the "myth of their origin".

In villages of Rajasthan, Pabuji was considered an ascetic and hence his blessings were sought for veterinary services provided by his disciples, the Bhopas. He is also invoked to cure children possessed of spirits by driving away the djinn; this is done by tying an amulet created during the early hours of the morning, towards the end of the narration of the Phad, by circling a holy thread seven times around the flame and then seven knots.

The epic story of Pabuji has been analysed by historians with respect to the other epic stories of Ramayana and Mahabharata and the conclusion drawn is that the Pabuji tradition is "one multilayered and collective narrative construction of different Rajasthani performers, transmitted in oral and written forms."

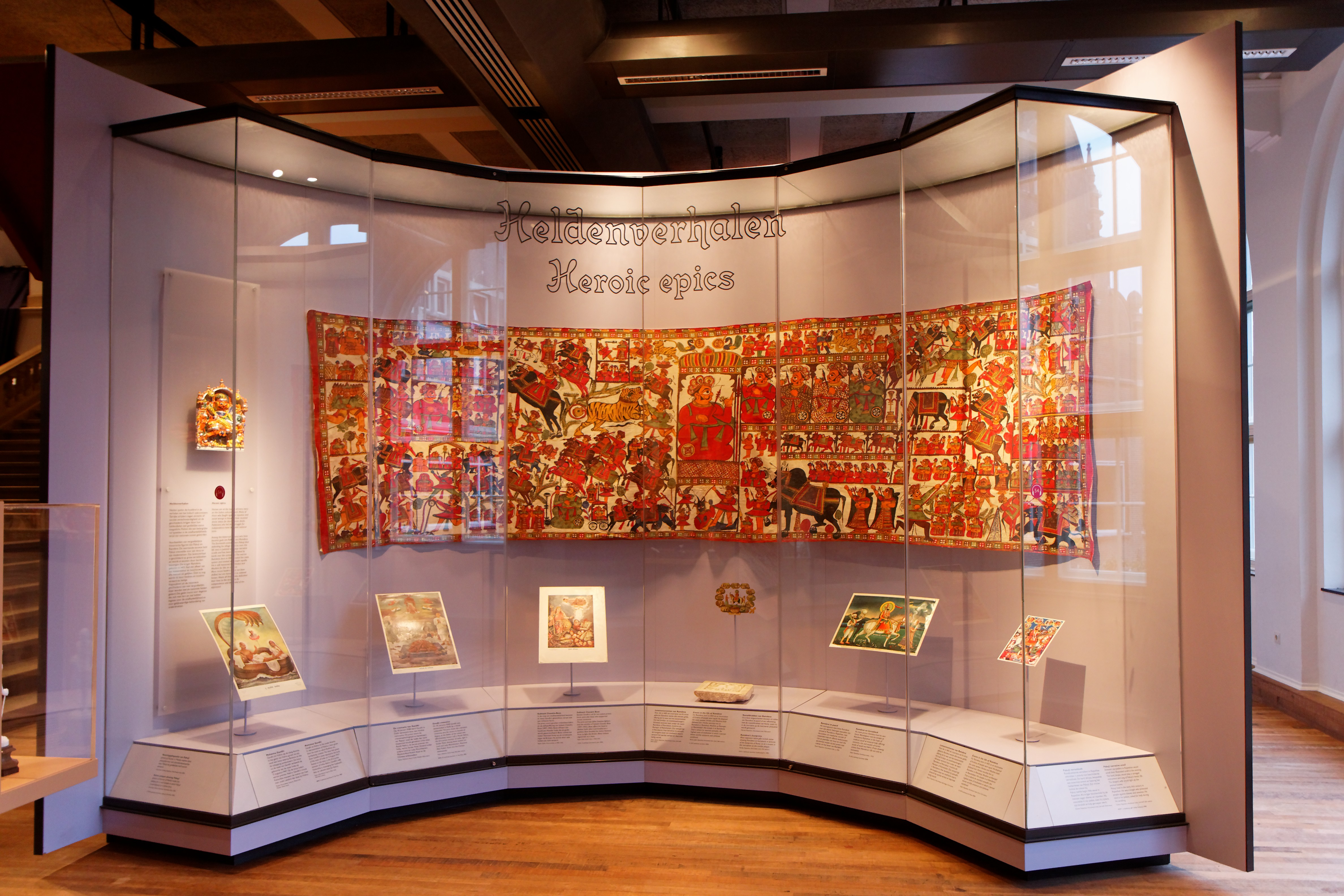
A panoramic view of the Pabhuji Ki Phad displayed in a museum in Europe (Wereldmuseum Amsterdam)

== The Phad ==
The Phad canvas is usually of 15 by 15 feet (4.6 m × 4.6 m) sheet cloth, on which are painted (or sewn) miniature scenes depicting the life of Pabuji and his adventures.

The Phad or Par represents, in its painting, the court of Pabuji (as a historical true Rajput chief who sacrifices his life for protection of others), his palace and his divine character as an incarnation of Laksmana, brother of the Rama of the Ramayana Hindu epic story, the forts in which he lived as well as the sanctum of his goddess Deval. The backdrop of such narrations is invariably in the desert villages of Rajasthan. The images in the painting are arranged logically, also showing revengeful exploits of his nephew on his enemy, Jindrav Khici. However, iconographically it is considered as "extremely complex and intricate."

The depictions (as shown in the image in the infobox) shows according to historian William Dalrymple a "panorama of medieval Rajasthan: women, horses, peacocks, carts, archers, battles, washer-men and fishermen, kings and queens, huge grey elephants and herds of white cows and buff camels, many-armed demons, fish-tailed wonder-creatures and blue-skinned gods, all arranged around the central outsized figure of Pabuji, his magnificent black mare, Kesar Kalami, and his four great companions and brothers-in-arms."

The sequence of images (see infobox) painted on the Pabuji Ki Phad is: the main deity - Pabuji - is at the centre and to his right is his court with his four principal companions, on the left of the main deity, is the court of Buro, his brother. At the extreme left is Umarkot and at the left edge, Lanka. To the right of Pabuji's court is the court of the Lady Deval (goddess of Kolu). At the far right of the painting is Khici's court. The blank spaces in between are depicted with scenes of Pabuji's journey from Rajasthan to Umarkot, and also images of Ganesh, Sarasvati and Vishnu in different incarnations that are painted at the top of the Phad or Par.

The Phad, from the time it is painted by the renowned painters of this art form, is treated with utmost reverence by the Bophas. They make daily offerings to the Phad. It is considered a hereditary possession and is passed on to one of their kin to continue the tradition. As the Phad gets worn or torn or becomes threadbare, a formal religious procedure is followed to decommission it. This procedure is called tandakarna in Hindi, which means to cool or remove its divine power. This is done by confining to the holy waters of the Ganges or Pushkar Lake.

== Bhopas ==
Bhopa community in Rajasthan is considered to be of priest singers of Pabuji. They hail from the village of Pabusar(named after the hero of the epic) and are traced to the 16th century, though 14th century is also mentioned. It is also said that sweet water well was located in the village by Pabuji. They belong to the Nayak community, a Scheduled Caste community of Rajasthan. Phads are integral to the Bhopas' vocation and are considered the “epic qua religious service.” They perform this art form through a combination of folk singing and dancing interspersed with interludes to interact with the audience in front of a scroll or canvas, known as Phad or Par in Rajasthani that depicts the episodes of the narrative of the folk deity. The Phad functions as a 'portable temple.' The Bhopas carry the Phad traditionally and are invited by villagers to perform in their localities during times of sickness and misfortune. The Phads are kept rolled during transit. After reaching a village or town, the Bhopas erect the Phad between two poles under a shamiana (an open tent)in a suitable public place shortly after nightfall. The performance goes on throughout the night and terminates only towards dawn.

== Narration ==
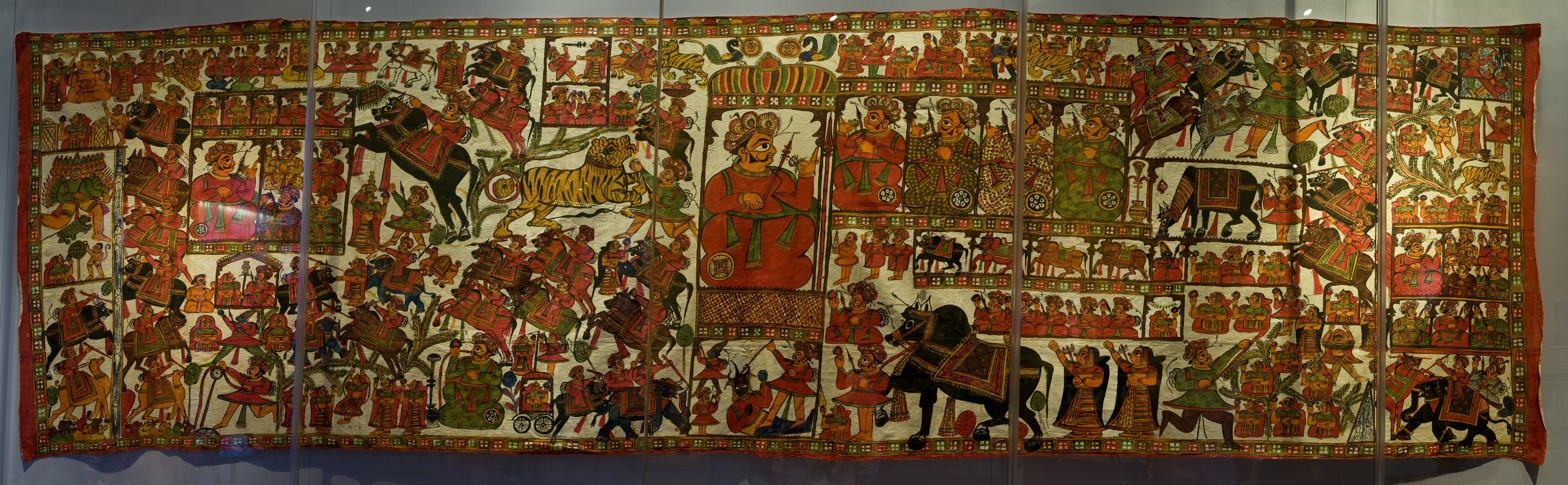
The Phad

The narrative usually held by the Bhopas in the backdrop of Rajasthani deserts, is narrated by the poet-singers as a structured rendition of the epic story, called the Pabuprakasa, glorifying Pabuji as a divine being. The rendering is highly "stylized and formulistic in its narration". The text, which has a number of episodes, belongs to two different types namely, the parvaros and the sayls. The narrative of Pabuji, in particular, is recorded in the Khyata of Muhato Nainasi, a text with the title Vata Pabujiri. The entire narration relates to Pabuji and his heroic deeds. This epic, a courtly religious poem invoking Pabuji has 4,000 lines. Its recitation, from start to the end, takes full five nights of 8 hours duration from dusk to dawn; it is rarely fully recited now. The present trend of narration has many intermissions for taking tea, singing devotional songs (bhajans), popular film music, thus making it partly an entertainment coupled with the "religious ritual of invoking Pabuji as a living deity".

The musical and sometimes chanted narration is in colloquial Rajasthani dialect. Bhopa is the main singer (narrator) who does it with an accompaniment of a musical instrument, called the ravanhattho (a desert zither or a spike fiddle with eighteen strings but without frets), which he crafts by himself. A dholak or drum is also part of the musical ensemble. During the entire narration, Bhopa’s wife called the Bhopi, is present with him and joins him in singing. She also carries a lantern to shed light on the Phad when Bhopa is indicating to some scenes on the Phad linked to his narration. The singer has a stick with which he points out each scene and narrates the story. He also sometimes dances to his songs and interjects his performance with jokes and banter with the audience. There are several such itinerant Bhopa groups performing in various parts of Rajasthan. One of the famous narrators of the epic named Mohan from Pabusar was an illiterate but he could recite the entire 4000 lines of the epic.

The narration of the epic is done in the jagarans (night-wakes) time to invoke the prakas, meaning the presence of the folk deities, in the Rajasthani dialect. The set sequence for the narration, which in local language, called the phad vacno or performance is in the following order.

- Purification rites involving erecting of the Phad is preceded by sanctifying the site by cleaning the land below the Phad and lighting incense sticks. A small jyot (lamp) made of cowdung is lit in front of the Phad and then circled around the Phad of Phabuji.
- The procedure for stretching the Phad involves running a string through the red band stitched at the top and then tie the rope to wooden or bamboo posts at both ends.
- The bard narrating the epic, the Bhopa, is dressed in a costume called the baga. The Bhopa announces the start of the narration by blowing the Conch shell
- Devotees offer grains and money for consecrating the Phad
- The deities depicted on the Phad are then invoked.
- The narration of the epic story by the Bhopas is "prosimetric." The narration of verse sections is called gavs, which has a number of couplets known as karis. This is followed by the narration of the prose sections called arthavs (explanations). Each scene on the Phad is specifically shown with a wand by the Bhopas and then narrated
- Collection of monetary contributions is part of the frequent intermissions for food, tea, tobacco or rest. Every time a donation is received, the Bhopa makes the announcement by blowing a conch-shell and mentioning the name of the donor.
- At the conclusion of the performance, the Bhopas do an arati (offering of a lighted lamp for the deities) to the characters on the Phad, which is followed by another round of donations before the Phad is rolled up before dawn

The Phad's epic narrations are attended primarily by the traditionally nomadic and camel-herding Rabari caste (for Pabuji is their principal deity). The Rajputs of Pabuji’s own warrior caste also attend. It represents navrasas or nine forms of Indian classical aesthetics such as love, war, devotion and so forth in it. Its particular theme is enthralling and is more on bravery so much so that it is said that due to "a narration of the tale, the gross gets burned around it". Though they cater to the village Rajputs, narration is also attended by the Rajputs of the royal class. Present day narratives have drawn parallels with the Ramayana episodes to create divine attributes of the deities to Pabuji and the other characters. One writer attributes this development as "regarding Pabuji and other characters as avatars of Sanskritic deities and personages, though Brahmin influence is still minimal. Pabuji seems to be worshipped for very worldly ends, namely sound health, or its recovery, prosperity, a good marriage, a successful childbirth, and so on. Traditional Brahminic spirituality of moksha and mention of the Vedas is still virtually absent."

An annual festival of Pabuji Ki Phad epic narration is held at Pabusar when 10,000 to 15,000 people are said to attend. This annual event is arranged and popularised by the Jaipur Virasat Foundation.

== Phad painters ==
The Phads or Pars are painted by professional painters called citero. Well known professional painters are known by the clan name 'Josi' of the Chhipa caste. Their expertise is in textile-printing and they operate from their traditional towns of Shahpura and Bhilwara in Bhilwara district of Rajasthan. There are at least seventeen or eighteen painters involved in painting this art form. However, Shree Lal Joshi and Shanti Lal Joshi are the most noted artists of the phad painting, who are known for their innovations and creativity. Bhopas also say that the painting made by Shree Lal Joshi have "the powers to exorcise any spirit...once the Phad was complete and the eyes of the hero were painted in, neither the artist nor the Bhopa regarded it as a piece of art. Instead it instantly became a mobile temple: as Pabuji's devotees were semi-nomadic herders, his temple -the Phad visited the worshippers rather than the other way round."

Painting method

It is a hereditary art form, which is passed on from father to son. A Bhopa commission's this painting for religious purpose. The painting is drawn on a cotton cloth. The cloth is first prepared by applying a paste of flour and gum. It is then polished with a stone. An auspicious date is chosen for starting the painting since it is used for religious purpose by the Bhopa. A virgin girl only has the privilege of giving the first stroke of the brush on the Phad painting; normally the girl belongs to the painter's family or to a high-caste. An outline of the painting is drawn by the artist with light yellow colour paint; only earth colours or vegetable colours or indigo are used. The colours are then mixed with gum and water, and painted one colour after the other, in the order of orange, yellow, and so forth. Black is the last colour paint used for the border. Again, on an auspicious day, the painting is signed by the artist at the centre of the painting, close to the image of the main deity. Signature of the Bhopa who commissions the painting is also included, but it is optional. As a last act, the artist is said to give 'life' or "awaken the deity" of the painting by opening the pupil in the eyes of the main deity at the centre of the painting. It then becomes the Pabuji Ki Phad of the Bhopa who has commissioned it.

The earliest painting of a Phad or Par, as mentioned by John Smith, a scholar of the "Epic of Pabuji", is dated to 1867. Colonel James Tod, the British Lieutenant reported of a ceremony that included a Par painting in 1819. With the emphasis on bardic narration of Pabuji Ki Phad said to be on the decline in recent times, painters of Pars or Phads are also making Phads as collector's items in smaller sizes, and with different religious and other themes.

== See also ==
- Bhopa
- Devnarayan

== Bibliography ==
- Dalrymple, William (2009). Nine Lives. Bloomsbury Publishing Plc. ISBN 978-1-4088-0153-6.
- Smith, John D. (2005). The Epic of Pabuji. Katha, New Delhi. ISBN 81-87649-83-6.
