= Bhopa =

Class of priests in Rajasthan

The Bhopa people are the priest-singers of the folk deities in the state of Rajasthan, India. They perform in front of a scroll, known as phad (par in the Rajasthani language) that depicts the episodes of the narrative of the folk deity and functions as a portable temple. The Bhopas carry this phad traditionally, and are invited by villagers to perform in their localities during times of sickness and misfortune. Traditionally, the phads are kept rolled in transit. After reaching a village or town, the Bhopas erect the phads between two poles in a suitable public place shortly after nightfall. The performance goes on throughout the night and terminates only in early morning

== The phad vacnos (performances) by the Bhopas ==
Bhopas belong to a variety of castes. The epic narratives of the folk deities are told by the Bhopas during the jagarans (night-wakes). The purpose of these jagarans are to evoke the prakas (presence) of the folk deities. The sequence which a phad vacno (performance) follows can be summarized as follows:

1. Purificatory rites are carried out before setting up the phad, which include sweeping the ground beneath the phad clean and burning incense sticks.
2. The phad is set by fastening the rope that runs through the red band sewn on at the top to wooden poles set at each end.
3. The Bhopa wears the special costume, known as baga.
4. Grains and money are offered for consecrating the phad.
5. The deities, whose images are depicted at the top of the phad are invoked.
6. The Bhopa begins prosimetric narration of the epical narrative which consists of verse sections, known as gavs and followed by prose sections known as arthavs (explanations). The gavs consist of a number of karis (couplets). The Bhopa points out each scene on the phad with a stick and narrates the episode.
7. Donations are collected during frequent pauses for food, tea, tobacco or rest. The Bhopa blows a conch-shell, one blast after receiving each donation. The name of the donor is announced by the Bhopa.
8. An arati for the deities and the characters on the phad is carried out at the end of the performance.
9. Offerings are again made at the end of the performance, when the phad is rolled back again before sunrise.

== Bhopas of Pabuji ==
The Bhopa sings various episodes from the narrative of Pabuji and his wife known as Bhopi holds an oil lamp near the visual being described. The Bhopi also sings some parts of the episodes. Mohan Bhopa (who - till his demise in 2011 - performed along with his wife Batasi Bhopi) is a celebrated present-day singer-priest of Pabuji, covered by author and historian William Dalrymple in his famed book Nine Lives. After her husband's death, Batasi now performs with her eldest son Mahavir.

== Bhopas of Devnarayan ==
There are three different types of Bhopas of deity Devnarayan namely the temple Bhopas, the Jamat Bhopas and the Par Bhopas. The Jamat Bhopas of Deity Devnarayan can only be from Gurjar community as the jamat is related to Devji sect, however par Bhopas and temple Bhopas belong to different castes including Gurjars, Kumbhars and balais. During the performance, a jantar (a type of fretted veena with two resonators of gourd or wood) is played to accompany the songs. Usually there are two Bhopas who recite the epic, one is the main Bhopa, the Patavi, and the other is his assistant, the Diyala. When the Patavi Bhopa sings a particular episode of the epic, his junior partner, the Diyala Bhopa lights an oil lamp and illuminates the particular part of the phad, where the particular episode which is being sung is depicted. He also sings some parts of the episodes.

== See also ==
- Pabuji Ki Phad
