= Rabari =

Ethnic group of India

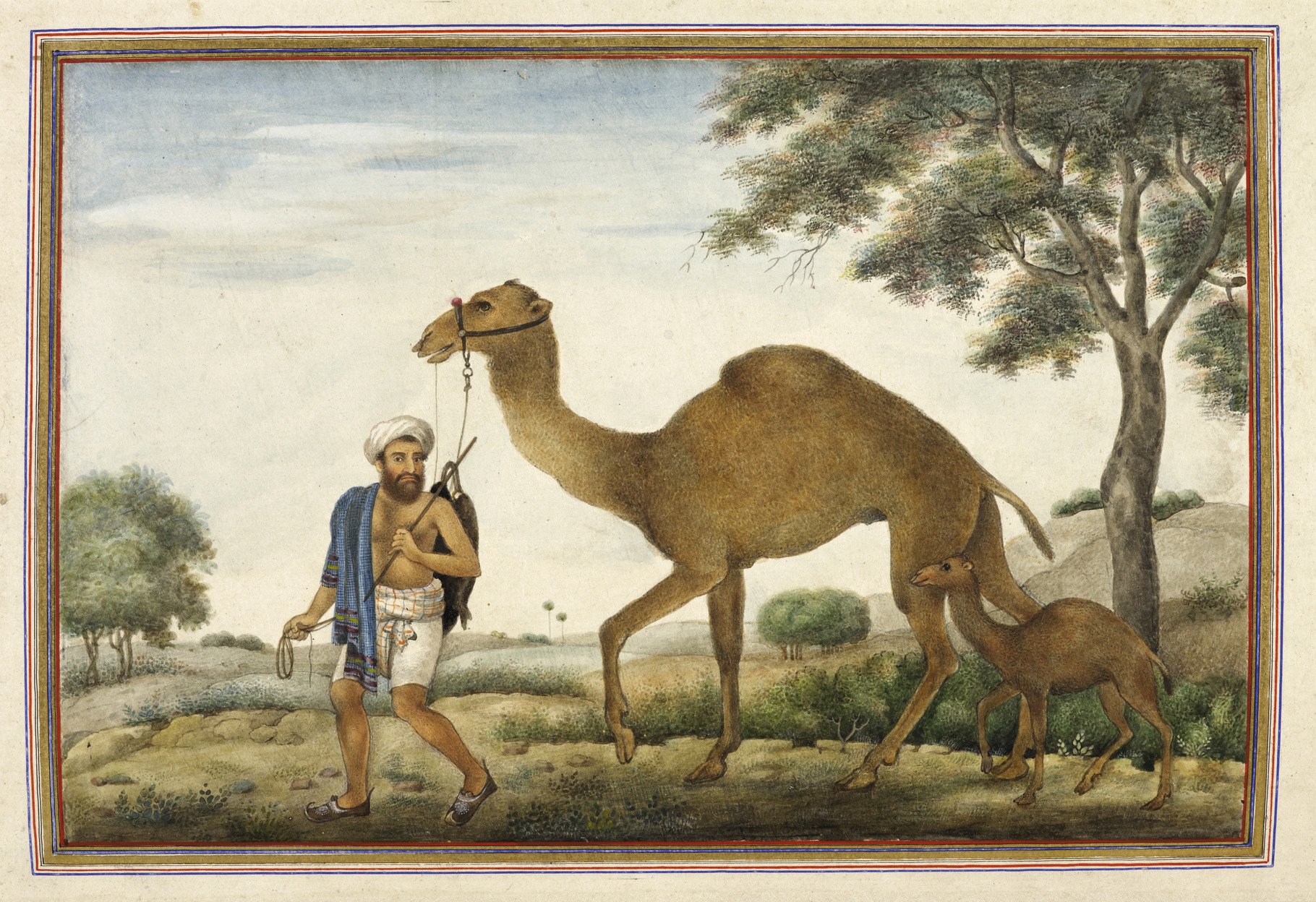
Rabari, a caste of Camel Herders- Tashrih al-aqvam (1825)

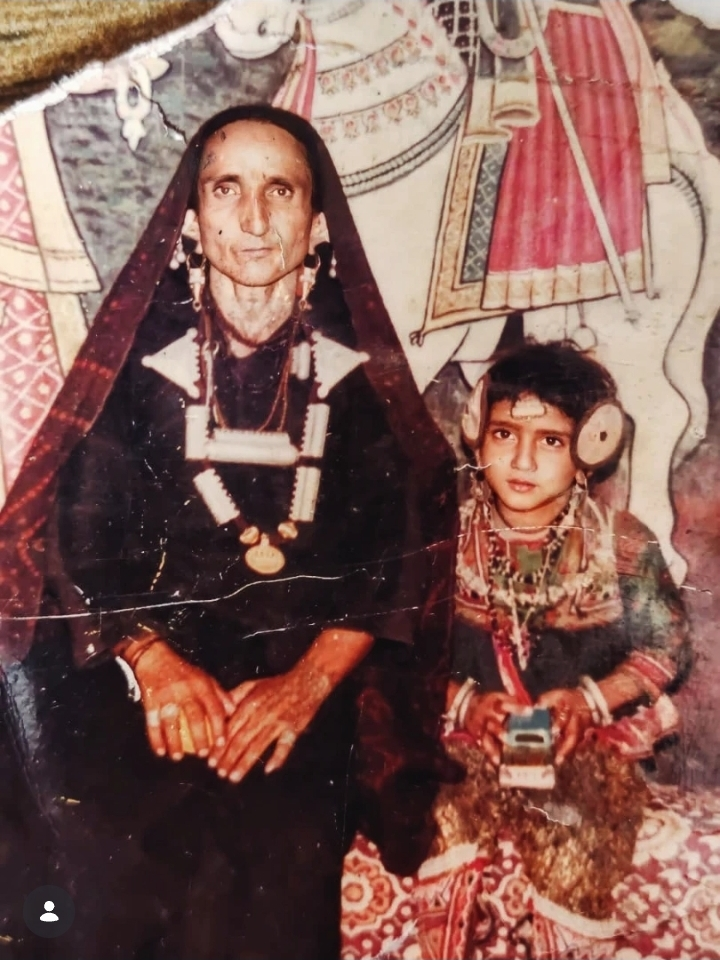
A Rabari woman in traditional attire in Kutch, Gujarat.

Rabari (also known as Rebari, Raika, Desai and Dewasi) is a Hindu caste which mainly inhabits the Indian states of Gujarat (in Kutch) and Rajasthan (in Marwar) with sparse populations in Punjab, Haryana and Madhya Pradesh (in Malwa), and also in Sindh, Pakistan. They are camel herders originally, who started adopting cattle, goats and -sheep after the 19th century

== Camel heritage ==
Camel Domestication

Rabaris have vibrant legacy of Dromedary camel rearing ,Which was supplied to Rajput kingdoms, But historically they also used Bactrian camels to cross breed and sell sale hybrid camel , as part of assignment from mughal army

Camel Warfare

Rabaris had excellence in using camel in warfare , with several examples being from harmal who is celebrated in marwari folklore for assisting pabuji rathore camel raid in sindh; to Haja who resisted maratha invasion using Zamburakh in gohilwad, Saurashtra.

Rabaris depict their martyr hero stones by carving Camel riding Warrior human figure with Archery and Spear

== Origin ==
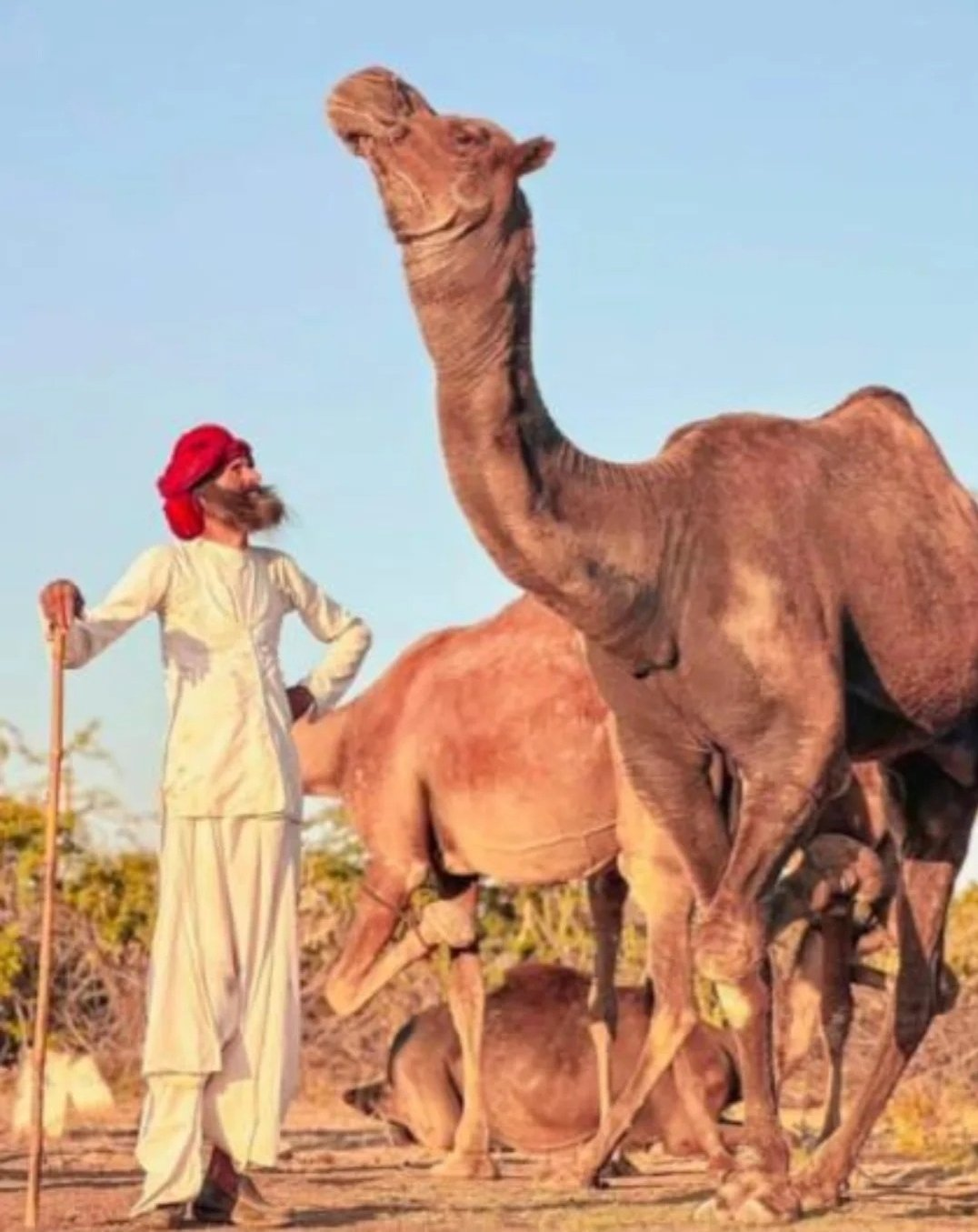
A Rabari camel herder in Rajasthan.

The Rabari claim Balochistan as the place of their origin where there still is a temple of the goddess Hinglaj who they worship. Enthoven traces their origin to Marwar (in Rajasthan) and Sindh, as well as their regular pilgrimages to the temple of Hinglaj in Balochistan. The initial migrations in the folkloric memory of the Rabari refer to flights to Sindh and Kutch undertaken to escape Muslim persecution. According to Sigrid Westphal-Helbusch, significant migrations of Rabaris took place between 12th to 14th century, when they moved from Marwar to Sindh and Kutch. The migrations of Rabaris in fact follow similar paths as those of Rajputs and Charans, two other migrant group in this region, indicating intertwined histories. Westphal-Helbusch ascribes the goddess worship traditions of Rabaris to the Charan influence. as per Kevin McGrath their origins are probably Sindhi, and they came in Kutch, some centuries ago, from Balochistan via a northward circuit through Rajasthan to, where many of them still live.

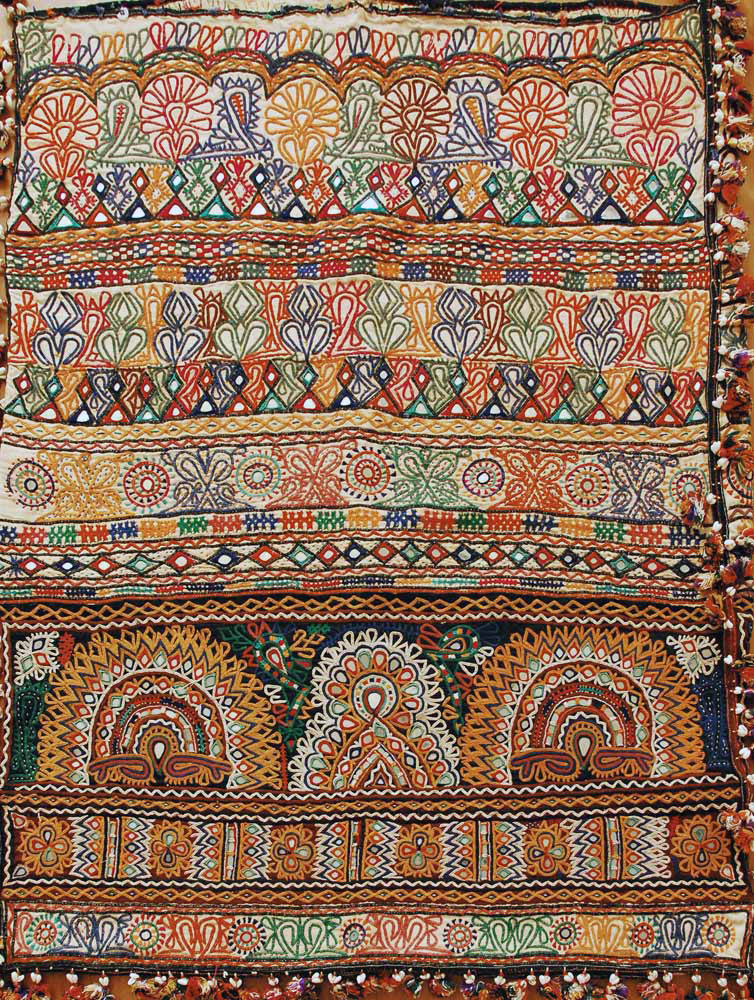
Vintage Rabari bag with heavy embroidery that is unique to Rabaris of Western India. Such bags are used for gifting at wedding ceremonies.

== Culture ==
Rabaris are known for their elaborate Trajva tattoos. They are usually done on the forearms, face, throat. The tattoo can have a range of meanings, including representations of fertility or skill milestones. Green sap from a nearby plant is mixed with soot to make the tattoos.

== Bibliography ==
=== Books ===
- Francesco D'Orazi Flavoni. (1990) Rabari a Pastoral community of Kutch
- Street, Brian V. (2002), Literacy and Development: Ethnographic Perspectives, Routledge, ISBN 9781134566204....
