= Kuh-e Shah Rural District =

Rural district in Hormozgan province, Iran

Kuh-e Shah Rural District Persian: دهستان كوهشاه
- Rural District
- Location within Iran
- Coordinates: 28°05′57″N 56°49′35″E
- Country: Iran
- Province: Hormozgan
- County: Hajjiabad
- District: Ahmadi
- Capital: Pur

Population (2016)
  - Total: 6,082
- Time zone: UTC+3:30 (IRST)

Kuh-e Shah Rural District (Persian: دهستان كوهشاه) is in Ahmadi District of Hajjiabad County, Hormozgan province, Iran. Its capital is the village of Pur.

== Demographics ==
=== Population ===
At the time of the 2006 National Census, the rural district's population was 5,547 in 1,356 households. There were 5,358 inhabitants in 1,464 households at the following census of 2011. The 2016 census measured the population of the rural district as 6,082 in 1,721 households. The most populous of its 45 villages was Mazgerd, with 842 people.
