= Ahmadi Rural District =

Rural district in Hormozgan province, Iran

Ahmadi Rural District Persian: دهستان احمدئ
- Rural District
- Location within Iran
- Coordinates: 27°56′06″N 56°38′25″E
- Country: Iran
- Province: Hormozgan
- County: Hajjiabad
- District: Ahmadi
- Capital: Sar-e Gaz-e Ahmadi

Population (2016)
  - Total: 3,082
- Time zone: UTC+3:30 (IRST)

Ahmadi Rural District (Persian: دهستان احمدئ) is in Ahmadi District of Hajjiabad County, Hormozgan province, Iran. It is administered from the city of Sar-e Gaz-e Ahmadi.

== Demographics ==
=== Population ===
At the time of the 2006 National Census, the rural district's population was 5,261 in 1,215 households. There were 3,392 inhabitants in 966 households at the following census of 2011. The 2016 census measured the population of the rural district as 3,082 in 1,032 households. The most populous of its 48 villages was Hasham Balm, with 331 people.
