= Ahmadi District =

District in Hormozgan province, Iran

Ahmadi District Persian: بخش احمدی
- District
- Location within Iran
- Coordinates: 28°00′09″N 56°43′18″E
- Country: Iran
- Province: Hormozgan
- County: Hajjiabad
- Capital: Sar-e Gaz-e Ahmadi

Population (2016)
  - Total: 10,321
- Time zone: UTC+3:30 (IRST)

Ahmadi District (Persian: بخش احمدی) is in Hajjiabad County, Hormozgan province, Iran. Its capital is the city of Sar-e Gaz-e Ahmadi.

== History ==
After the 2006 National Census, the village of Sar-e Gaz-e Ahmadi was elevated to the status of a city.

== Demographics ==
=== Population ===
At the time of the 2006 census, the district's population was 10,808 in 2,571 households. The following census in 2011 counted 9,920 people in 2,746 households. The 2016 census measured the population of the district as 10,321 inhabitants in 3,106 households.

=== Administrative divisions ===
Ahmadi District Population
Administrative Divisions	2006	2011	2016
Ahmadi RD	5,261	3,392	3,082
Kuh-e Shah RD	5,547	5,358	6,082
Sar-e Gaz-e Ahmadi (city)		1,170	1,157
Total	10,808	9,920	10,321
RD = Rural District
