= Rajasthani people =

Indo-Aryan ethnolinguistic group

Rajasthanis
Total population
- c. 68,548,437 (2011)

Regions with significant populations
- India

Languages
- Rajasthani languages, Hindi

Religion
- Majority: Hinduism; Minority: Islam and Jainism

Related ethnic groups
- Other Indo-Aryan peoples

The Rajasthani people or Rajasthanis are a group of Indo-Aryan peoples native to Rajasthan ("the land of kings"), a state in Northern India. Their languages, Rajasthani, is a part of the western group of Indo-Aryan languages.

== History ==
The first mention of the word Rajasthan comes from the works of George Thomas (Military Memories) and James Tod (Annals). Rajasthan literally means the Land of Kingdoms. However, western Rajasthan and eastern Gujarat were part of "Gurjaratra". The local dialects of the time use the expression Rājwār, the place or land of kings, later Rajputana.

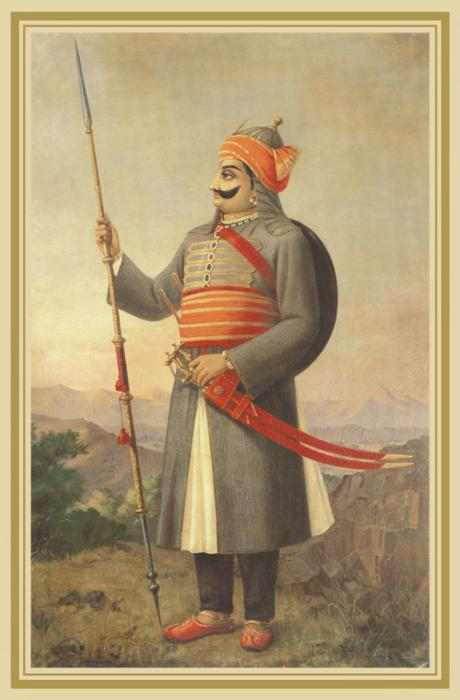
Maharana Pratap, a ruler and great warrior of his time.

Although the history of Rajasthan goes back as far as the Indus Valley Civilisation, the foundation of the Rajasthani community took shape with the rise of Western Middle Kingdoms such as Western Kshatrapas. Western Kshatrapas (35-405 CE) were rulers of the western part of India (Saurashtra and Malwa: modern Gujarat, Southern Sindh, Maharashtra, Rajasthan). They were the successors to the Indo-Scythians who invaded the area of Ujjain and established the Saka era (with Saka calendar), marking the beginning of the long-lived Saka Western Satraps kingdom. Saka calendar (also been adopted as Indian national calendar) is used by the Rajasthani community and adjoining areas such as Punjab and Haryana. With time, their social structures received stronger reorganisations, thus giving birth to several martial sub ethnic groups (previously called as Martial race but the term is now obsolete ). Rajasthanis emerged as major merchants during medieval India. Rajasthan was among the important centres of trade with Rome, eastern Mediterranean and southeast Asia.

=== Romani people ===
The “roma” apparently derives from a form ḍōmba ("man living by singing and music"). Linguistic and genetic evidence indicates the Romanies originated from the Indian subcontinent, emigrating from the northwest of India.

== Origin ==
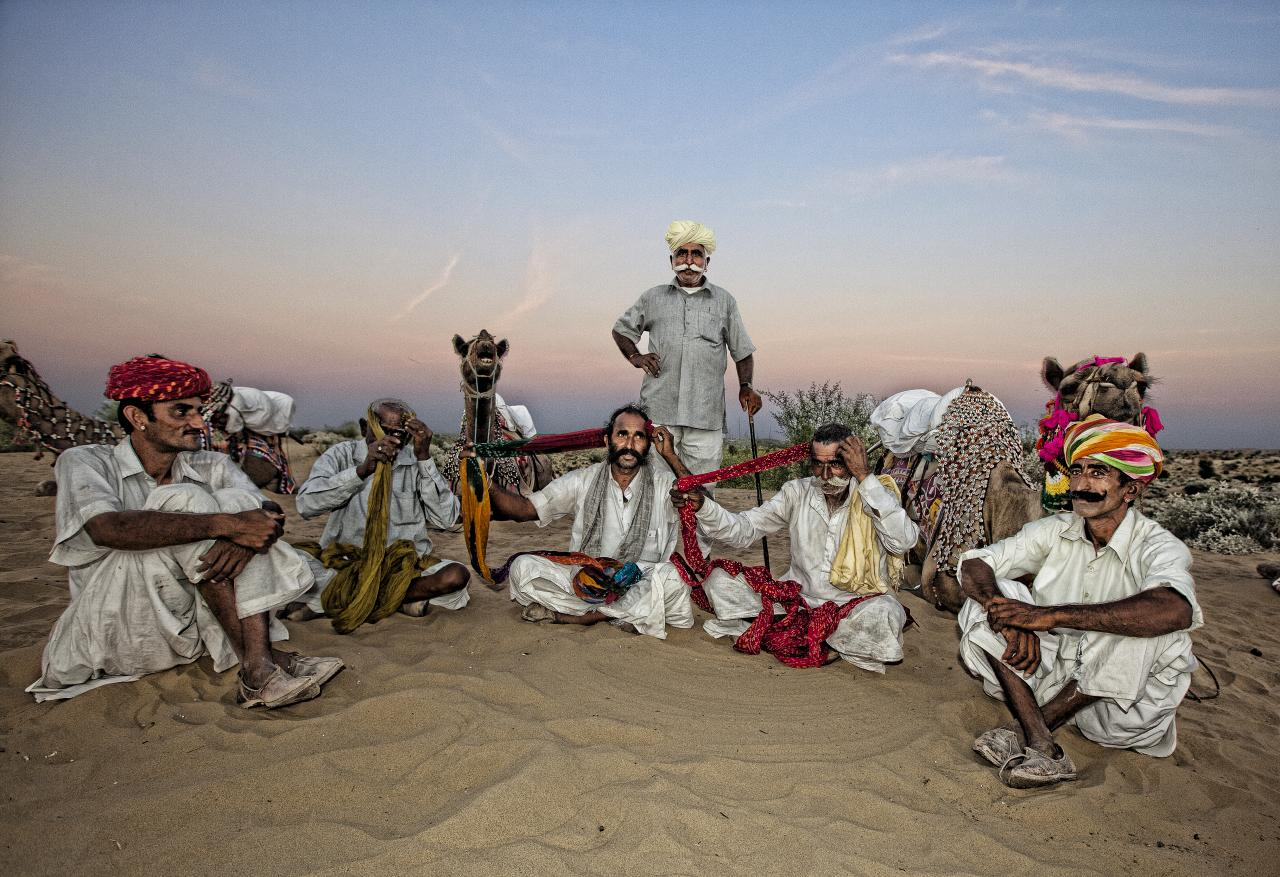
Rajasthani people

Like other Indo-Aryan peoples, modern day Rajasthanis and their ancestors have inhabited Rajasthan since ancient times. The erstwhile state of Alwar, in north-eastern Rajasthan, is possibly the oldest kingdom in Rajasthan. Around 1500 BC, it formed a part of the Matsya territories of Viratnagar (present-day Bairat) encompassing Bharatpur, Dholpur, and Karauli.

== Religion ==
Rajasthani society is a blend of predominantly Hindus with sizeable minorities of Muslims, Sikhs and Jains.

=== Hinduism ===
Shaivism and Vaishnavism is followed by majority of the people; however, Shaktism is followed in the form of Bhavani and her avatars are equally worshiped throughout Rajasthan.

Meenas of Rajasthan till date strongly follow Vedic culture which usually includes worship of Bhainroon (Shiva) and Krishna as well as the Durga.

The Charans worship various forms and incarnations of Shakti such as Hinglaj or Durga, Avad Mata, Karni Mata, and Khodiyar.

The Rajputs generally worship the Karni Mata, Sun, Shiva, Vishnu, and Bhavani (Goddess Durga). Meerabai was an important figure who was devoted Krishna.

The Bishnoi, also spelled as Vishnoi, is a Hindu Vaishnava community or panth found in the Western Thar Desert and northern states of India. Bishnoi community is turned into a Hindu caste with time. It has a set of 29 Niyamas (principles/commandments) given by Guru Jambheshwar.

The Gujars worship the Devnarayan, Shiva, and Goddess Bhavani. Historically, the Gujars were Sun-worshipers and are described as devoted to the feet of the Sun-god.

Hinduism in Rajasthan

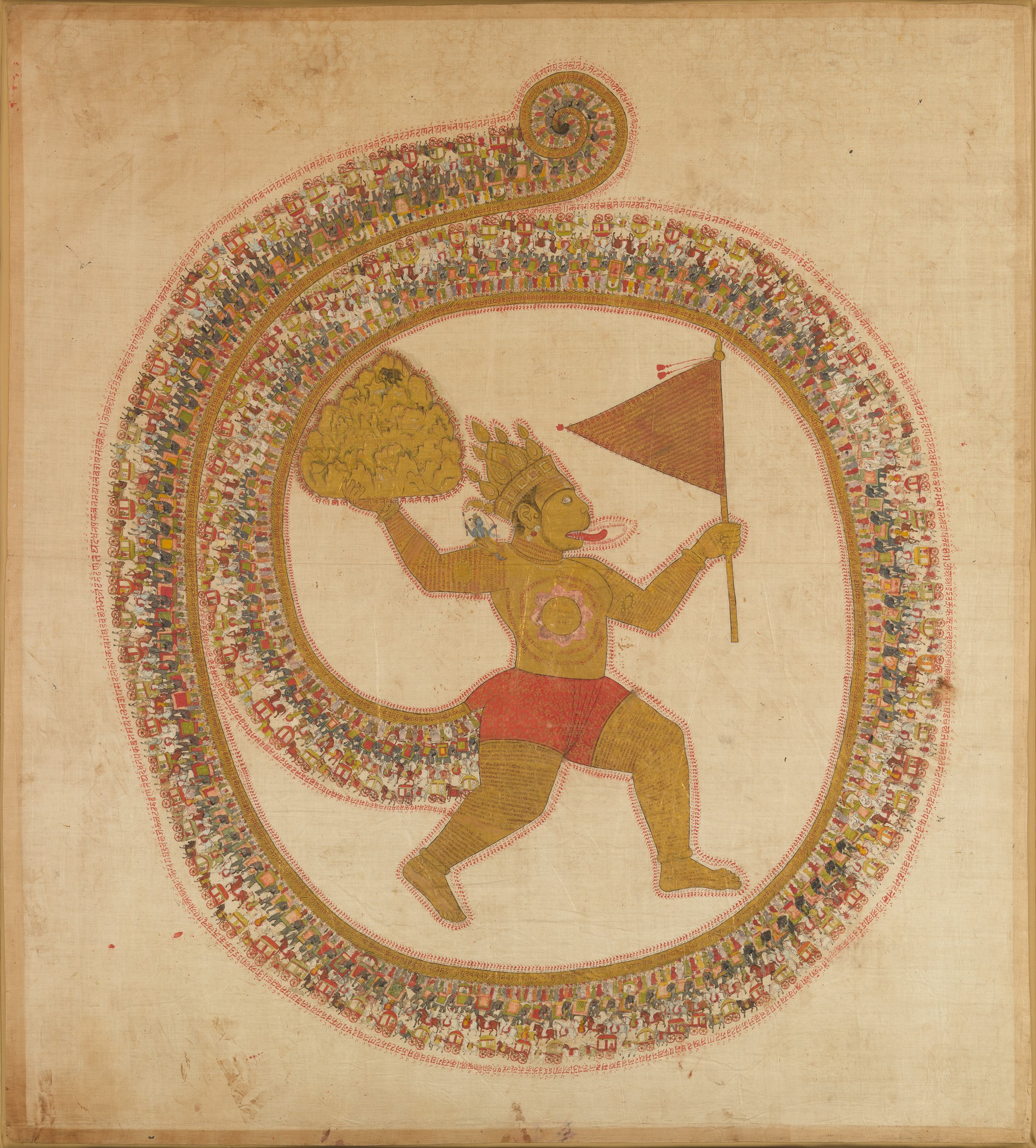
Hanuman

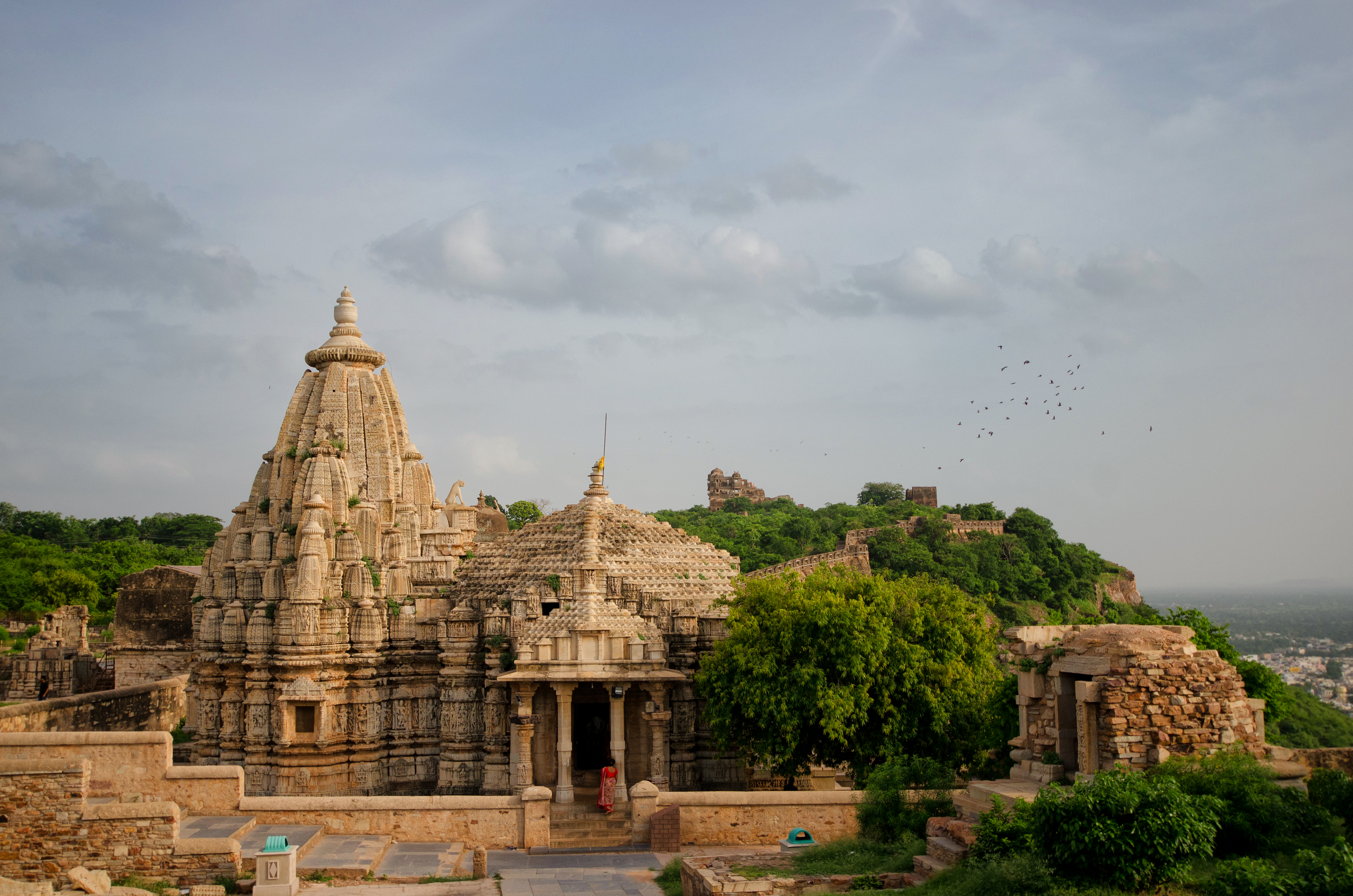
Shiva temple at Chittor Fort

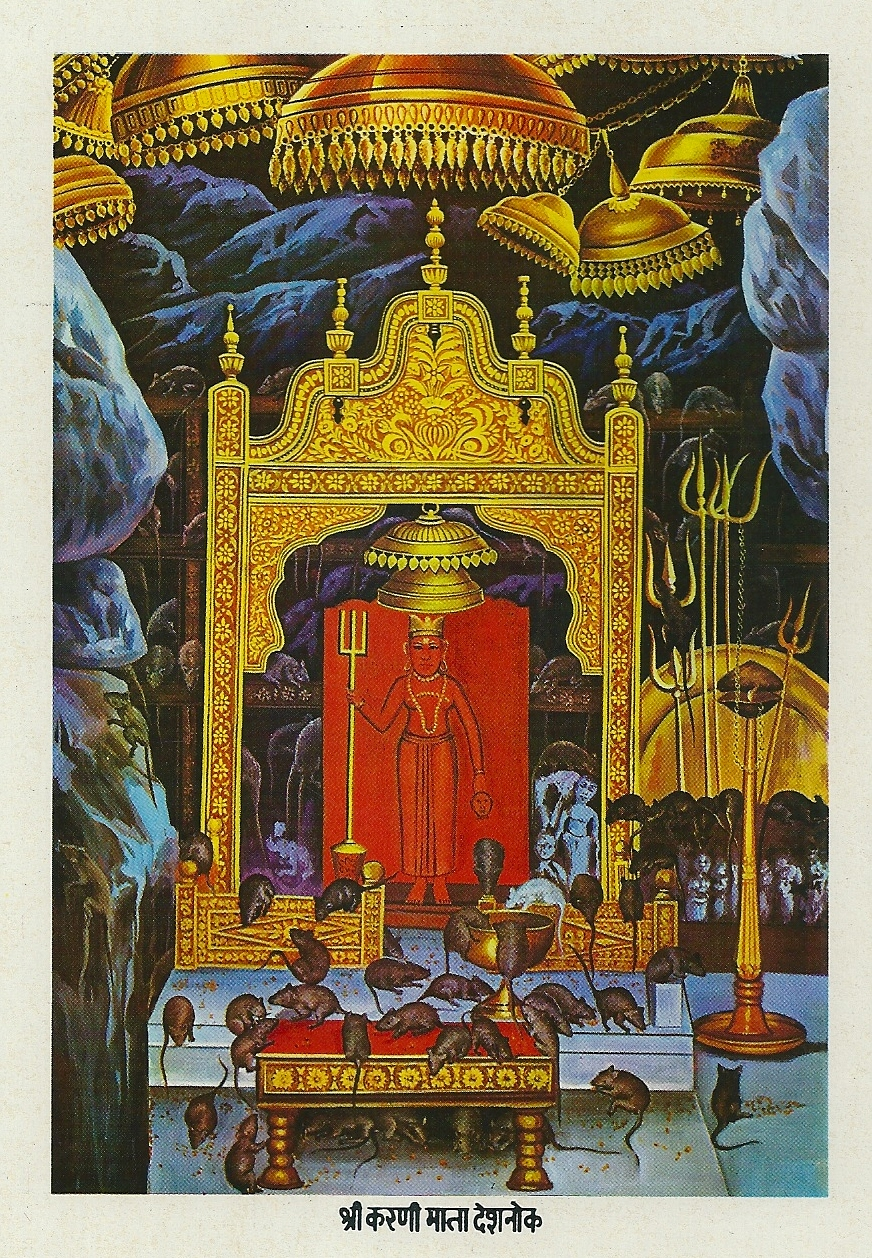
Karni Mata

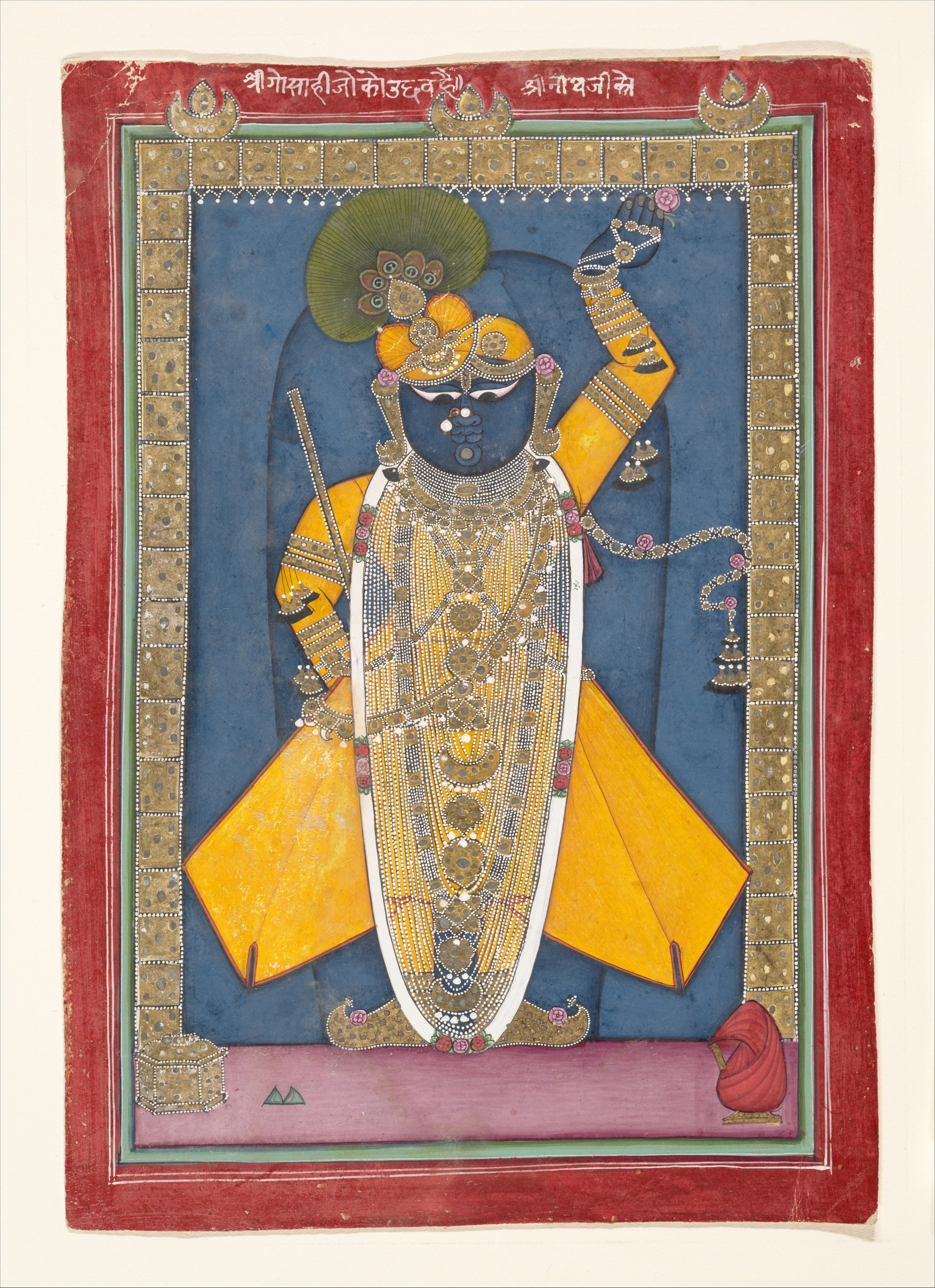
Krishna in the form of Shri Nathji

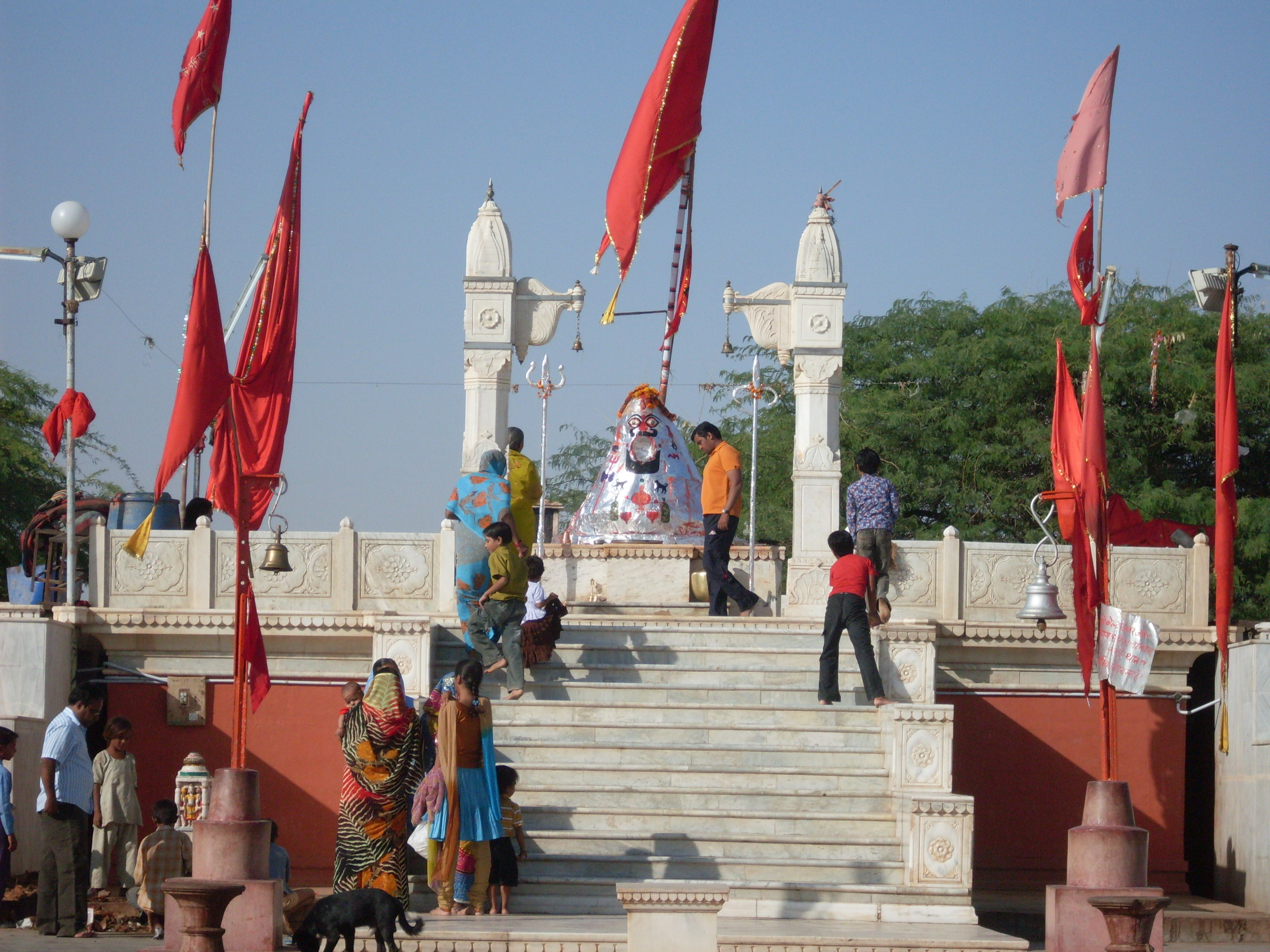
Bheruji Temple (Bhairava)

=== Islam ===
Rajasthani Muslims are predominantly Sunnis. They are mainly Meo, Mirasi, Khanzada, Qaimkhani, Manganiar, Muslim Ranghar, Merat, Sindhi-Sipahi, Rath, and Pathans. Converts to Islam still maintained many of their earlier traditions. They share lot of socio-ritual elements. Rajasthani Muslim communities, after their conversion, continued to follow pre-conversion practices (Rajasthani rituals and customs) which is not the case in other parts of the country. This exhibits the strong cultural identity of Rajasthani people as opposed to religious identity. According to 2001 census, Muslim population of Rajasthan is 4,788,227, accounting for around 9% of the total population.

=== Other religions ===
Some other religions are also prevalent such as Buddhism, Christianity, Parsi religion and others. Over time, there has been an increase in the number of followers of Sikh religion. Though Buddhism emerged as a major religion during 321-184 BC in Mauryan Empire, it had no influence in Rajasthan for the fact that Mauryan Empire had minimal impact on Rajasthan and its culture. Although Jainism is not that prevalent in Rajasthan today, Rajasthan and Gujarat areas were historically strong centres of Jainism in India.

== Castes and communities ==
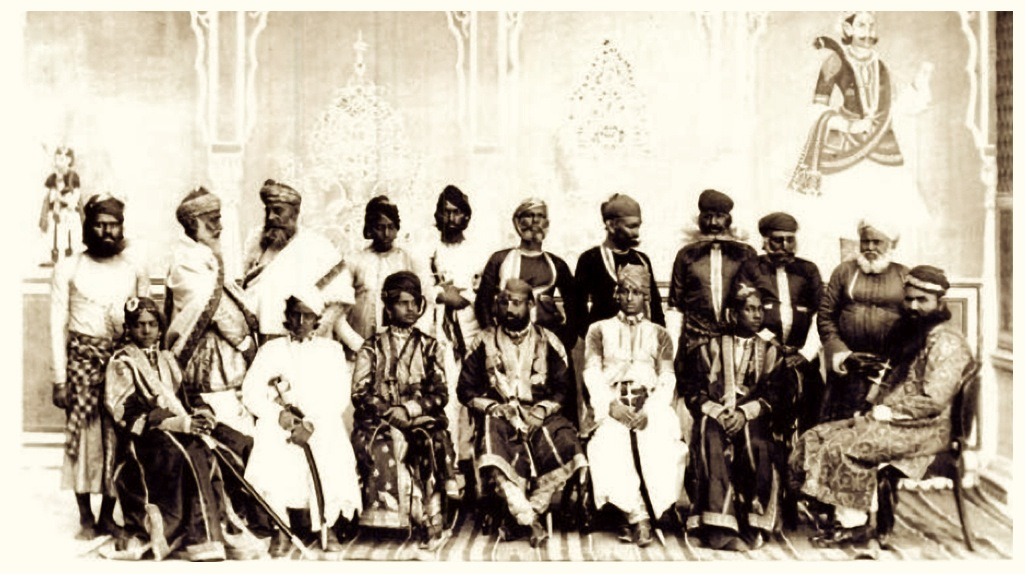
Noblemen from Jaipur 1875

Rajasthanis form an ethno-linguistic group that is distinct in its language, history, cultural and religious practices, social structure, literature, and art. However, there are many different castes and communities, with diversified traditions of their own. Major sub ethnic groups are Rajputs, Raikas, Rajpurohits, Brahmans, Bishnois, Jats, Gurjars, Yadavs, Meenas, Berwas, Chamar, Charans, Meghwals, Malis, Kolis, Agrawals, Barnwals, Kumhars, Kumawat, etc.

- Bania are the trading communities which includes Aggarwals, Barnwals, Khandelwals and Maheshwaris. Agarwals trace their origin to Agroha, a historic town near Hisar in Haryana and Barnwal (also spelled Baranwal, Burnwal, Varnwal, Warnwal or Barnawal) is an Indian toponymic Marwari surname from Baran in Rajasthan, India, while Khandelwal and Maheshwari communities are said to be originated from Khandela, near Jaipur. Baniya community is known for their excellent trading techniques and business acumen.
- Bishnoi (also Vishnoi) is a Vaishnava community which follow Vedic culture and live in well organised social structure. Most of them are agricultural landowners, but many of them are opting for service sector. Also, Bishnois from south-western Rajasthan are business oriented people. Bishnois predominantly live the districts of Anupgarh, Sri Ganganagar, Hanumangarh, Bikaner, Jaisalmer, Barmer, Balotra, Sanchore, Jodhpur, Jodhpur rural, Phalodi, Pali but can also be found throughout Rajasthan in smaller numbers. They are categorised as a forward caste in all the states of India except in Rajasthan, where they are categorised under OBC.
- Brahmin (alternately Brahman) are mostly Gaurs, Paliwals, Dadheechs, Nagars, Vyasas, Pareeks, Rankawats, Audichya Brahmin, Sikhwals, Saraswats, Sanadhyas, Shrimalis, Gargas, Abotis, Pushkarna Brahmins, Bhutia Brahmins. Brahmins, along with the Rajpurohit and Charan, are the only castes other than the Rajput who were granted jagirs in Rajasthan.
- Charan is a caste engaging in diverse occupations like poets, litterateurs, as well as warriors, traders and jagirdars. Charan, along with the Brahmins, are the only castes other than the Rajput who were granted jagirs and were allowed to use the title thakur.
- Gurjars are an animal rearing caste, this caste is included in the Backward Classes group in most of the states of India. They are also found in some states like Jammu and Kashmir and Himachal Pradesh in good number. They were added in criminal tribe by britishers for revolting against them in various parts which is one of the main reason they were left behind in education and this tribe is generally known for its bravery.
- Jats are traditionally an agricultural caste and are listed under Other Backward Class of Rajasthan State. In east Rajasthan, Bharatpur and Dholpur, were ruled by Jat rulers. Jats of these two districts were removed from central OBC list after a order by Supreme Court of India in 2015. Rajasthan state government added them back in the state's OBC list but did not send the recommendation to central government, since they were removed by the Supreme Court.
- Khatik word is derived from the Sanskrit language word Khat. Khatik means "butcher". In ancient times the main profession of Khatik Caste was to slaughter and prepare sheep and goats. Found throughout India, the Khatik community began as hunters and butchers.
- Kumawats are also found all over Rajasthan with majority in Jaipur, Pali, Bikaner, Jodhpur Churu hanumangarh jaisalmer Sri ganganagar etc. . Kumawat's main profession is related to agriculture and now even they are into business all over the country like Indore, Bangalore, Hyderabad, Chennai etc.
- Meghwal The Meghwal or Meghwar (also known as Megh and Meghraj) people live primarily in northwest India, with a small population in Pakistan. Their traditional occupation was agricultural farming.
- Sain Nai mostly lives in Alwar, Dausa, Bharatpur, Jaipur & some other district of Rajasthan. They worship their kuldevi sati Narayani Mata (Temple in Alwar).
- Rajputs are various patrilineal clans historically associated with warriorhood. An aristocratic class in Rajasthan, they are descendants of ancient ruling dynasties of the region. Rajput is a Forward or General caste in India.
- Rajpurohit is a caste with traditions similar to both Rajputs and Brahmins. They are the descendants of Saptrishis. They are engaged in diverse occupations like Gurus of Rajput kings, warriors, traders and jagirdars. Rajpurohit, along with the Brahmins and Charan, are the only castes other than the Rajput who were granted jagirs and were allowed to use the title thakur. Rajpurohits, Rajputs and Charan are considered to be identical for their political ideology.
- Seervi are mainly in agriculture business in Jodhpur and Pali District of Rajasthan. Major population of Seervi's are followers of Aai Mata which has main temple at Bilara. These days Seervi have migrated from Rajasthan to Southern part of India and became good business community.
- Sunar (alternately, Sonar or Swarnkar, Soni) is a community of people who work as goldsmiths. The community is primarily Hindu, and found all over Rajasthan. The Sunar caste is in central as well as the state OBC list in Rajasthan.

There are few other tribal communities in Rajasthan, such as Meena and Bhils. Meena ruled on Dhundhar near 10th century. The Ghoomar dance is one well-known aspect of Bhil tribe. Meena and Bhils were employed as soldiers by the Rajputs. During colonial rule, the British government declared 250 groups which included Meenas, Gujars, etc. as "criminal tribes". Any group or community that took arms and opposed British rule were branded as criminal by the British government in 1871. This Act was repealed in 1952 by Government of India. Sahariyas, the jungle dwellers, who are believed to be of Bhil origin, inhabit the areas of Kota, Dungarpur and Sawai Madhopur in the southeast of Rajasthan. Their main occupations include working as shifting cultivators, hunters and fishermen. Garasias is a small Rajput tribe inhabiting Abu Road area of southern Rajasthan.

There are a few other colourful folks, groups like those of Gadia Luhar, Banjara, Nat, Kalbelia, and Saansi, who criss-cross the countryside with their animals. The Gadia Luhars are said to be once associated with Maharana Pratap.

== Rajasthani literature ==
Scholars agree on the fact that during 10th-12th century, a common language was spoken in western Rajasthan and northern Gujarat. This language was known as Old Gujarati (1100 AD — 1500 AD) (also called Old Western Rajasthani, Gujjar Bhakha, Maru-Gurjar). The language derived its name from Gurjara and its people, who were residing and ruling in Punjab, Rajputana, central India, and various parts of Gujarat at that time. It is said that Marwari and Gujarati has evolved from this Gurjar Bhakha later. The language was used as a literary language as early as the 12th century. Poet Bhoja has referred to Gaurjar Apabhramsha in 1014 AD. Formal grammar of Rajasthani was written by Jain monk and eminent scholar Hemachandra Suri in the reign of Chaulukya king Jayasimha Siddharaja. Rajasthani was recognised by the State Assembly as an official Indian language in 2004. Recognition is still pending from the government of India.

First mention of Rajasthani literature comes from the 778 CE novel Kuvalayamala, composed in the town of Jalor in south-eastern Marwar by Jain acharya Udyotana Suri. Udyotan Suri referred it as Maru Bhasha or Maru Vani. Modern Rajasthani literature began with the works of Suryamal Misrana. His most important works are the Vamsa Bhaskara and the Vira satsaī. The Vira satsaī is a collection of couplets dealing with historical heroes. Two other important poets in this traditional style are Bakhtavara Ji and Kaviraja Murari Dan. Apart from academic literature, there exists folk literature as well. Folk literature consists of ballads, songs, proverbs, folk tales, and panegyrics. The heroic and ethical poetry were the two major components of Rajasthani literature throughout its history. The development of Rajasthani literature, as well as virkavya (heroic poetry), from the Dingal language took form during the early formation of medieval social and political establishments in Rajasthan. Maharaja Chatur Singh (1879–1929) was a devotional poet from Mewar. His contributions were poetry style that was essentially a bardic tradition in nature. Another important poet was Hinglaj Dan Kaviya (1861–1948). His contributions are largely of the heroic poetry style.

Developmental progression and growth of Rajasthani literature cand be divided into 3 stages

Historical stages of Rajasthani literature
900 to 1400 AD	The Early Period
1400 to 1857 AD	Medieval Period
1857 to present day	Modern Period

== Culture and tradition ==
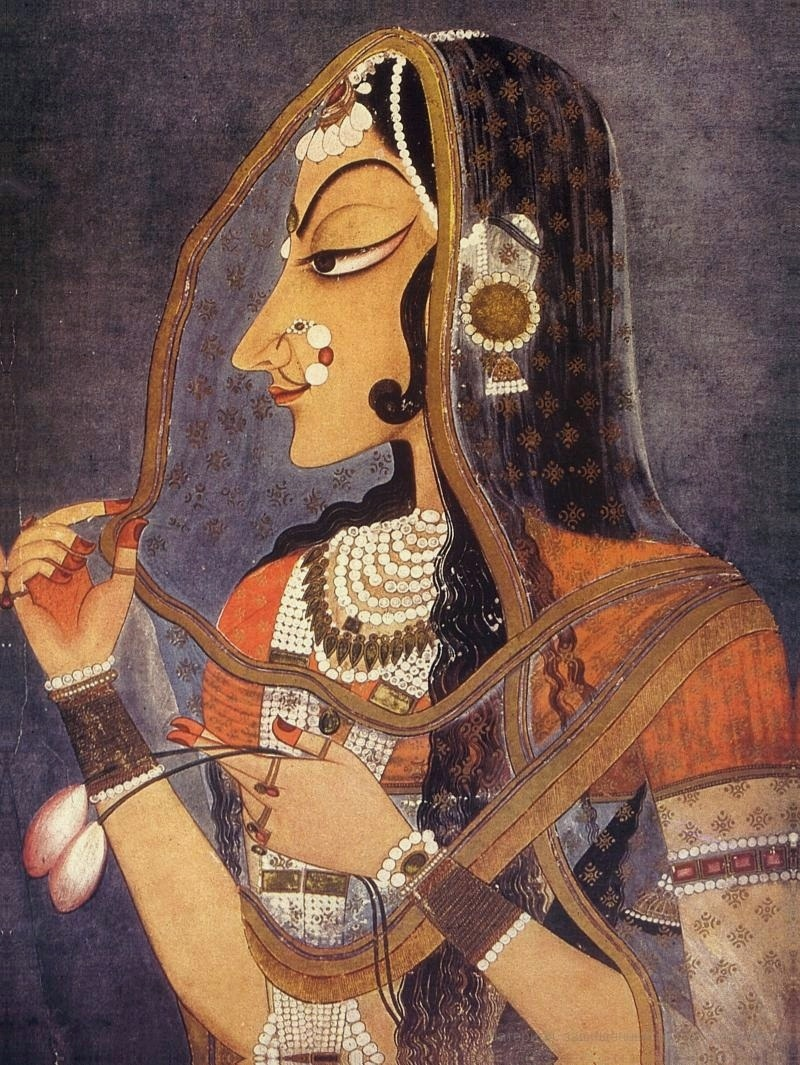
Bani Thani

=== Dress ===
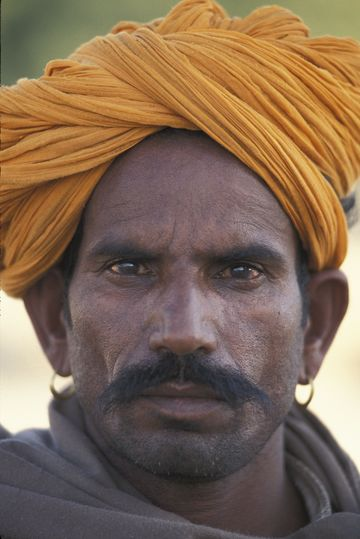
Rajasthani man wearing a paggar style of turban.

Traditionally men wear earrings, apadravya, moustaches, dhotis, kurta, angarkha, and paggar or safa (headgear resembling a turban; safa wearing style, colour, etc. vary by caste, age factors, etc., see Different styles of Safa). Traditional chudidar payjama (puckered trousers) frequently replaces dhoti in different regions. Women wear dress according to their caste culture. Poshak is worn by Rajput, Rajpurohit and Charan women only (as per tradition). However, dress style changes with lengths and breaths of vast Rajasthan. Dhoti is worn in different ways in Marwar (Jodhpur area) or Shekhawati (Jaipur area) or Hadoti (Bundi area). Similarly, there are a few differences pagri and safa despite both being Rajasthani headgear. Mewar has the tradition of paggar, whereas Marwar has the tradition of safa.

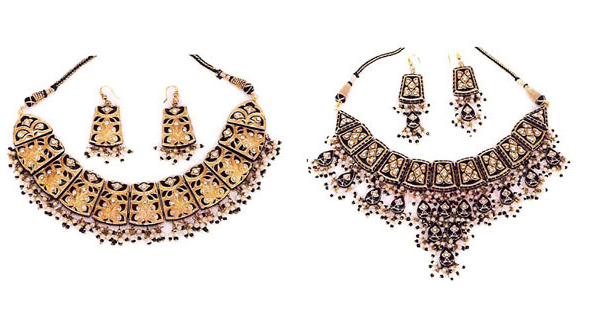
Traditional Rajasthani Jewelry

Rajasthan is also famous for its amazing ornaments. From ancient times, Rajasthani people have been wearing jewellery of various metals and materials. Traditionally, women wore gem-studded gold and silver ornaments. Historically, silver or gold ornaments were used for interior decoration stitched on curtains, seat cushions, handy-crafts, etc. Wealthy Rajasthanis used gem-studded gold and silver on swords, shields, knives, pistols, cannon, doors, thrones, etc., which reflects the importance of ornaments in lives of Rajasthanis.

=== Cuisine ===
Rich Rajasthani culture reflects in the tradition of hospitality which is one of its own kind. Rajasthan region varies from arid desert districts to the greener eastern areas. Varying degree of geography has resulted in a rich cuisine involving both vegetarian and non vegetarian dishes. Rajasthani food is characterised by the use of Jowar, Bajri, legumes and lentils, its distinct aroma and flavor achieved by the blending of spices including curry leaves, tamarind, coriander, ginger, garlic, chili, pepper, cinnamon, cloves, cardamom, cumin, and rosewater.

The major crops of Rajasthan are jowar, bajra, maize, ragi, rice, wheat, barley, gram, tur, pulses, ground nut, sesamum, etc. Millets, lentils, and beans are the most basic ingredients in food.

The majority of Hindu and Jain Rajasthanis are vegetarian. Rajasthani Jains do not eat after sundown and their food does not contain garlic and onions. Rajputs are usually meat eaters; however, eating beef is a taboo within the majority of the culture.

Rajasthani cuisine has many varieties, varying regionally between the arid desert districts and the greener eastern areas. The most famous dish is Dal-Baati-Churma. It is a little bread full of clarified butter roasted over hot coals and served with a dry, flaky sweet made of gram flour, and Ker-Songri made with a desert fruit and beans.

== Art ==
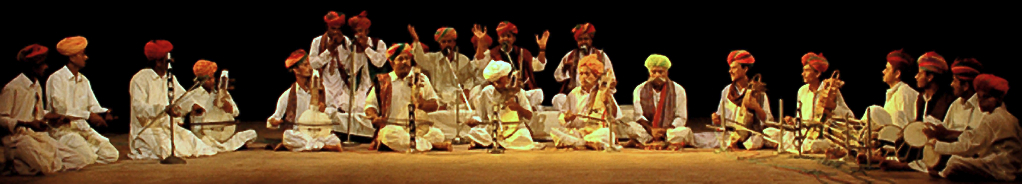

=== Music ===
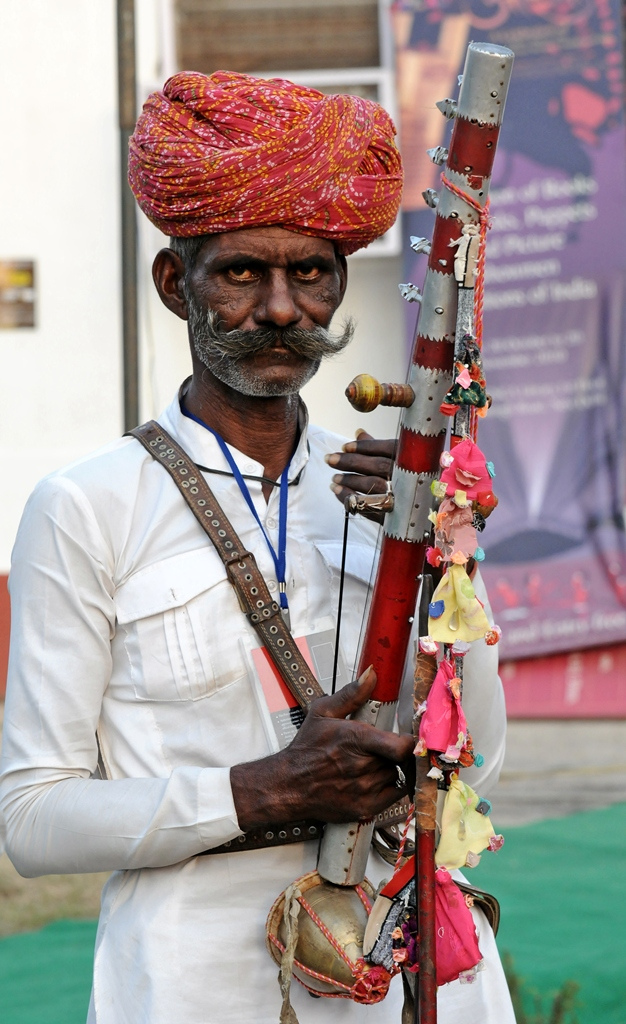
A Rajasthani folk singer with his Ravanahatha instrument at the Akhyan Festival at the Indira Gandhi National Centre for the Arts (IGNCA), near India Gate, New Delhi.

Rajasthani Music has a diverse collection of musicians. Major schools of music includes Udaipur, Jodhpur, and Jaipur. Jaipur is a major Gharanas which is well known for its reverence for rare ragas. Jaipur-Atrauli Gharana is associated with Alladiya Khan (1855–1943), who was among the great singers of the late 19th and early 20th century. Alladiya Khan was trained both in Dhrupad and Khyal styles, though his ancestors were Dhrupad singers. The most distinguishing feature of Jaipur Gharana is its complex and lilting melodic form.

=== Rajasthani paintings ===
The colourful tradition of Rajasthani people reflects in art of paintings as well. This painting style is called Maru-Gurjar painting. It throws light on the royal heritage of ancient Rajasthan. Under the Royal patronage, various styles of paintings developed, cultivated, and practised in Rajasthan, and painting styles reached their pinnacle of glory by 15th to 17th centuries. The major painting styles are phad paintings, miniature paintings, kajali paintings, gemstone paintings, etc. There is incredible diversity and imaginative creativity found in Rajasthani paintings. Major schools of art are Mewar, Marwar, Kishangarh, Bundi, Kota, Jaipur, and Alwar.

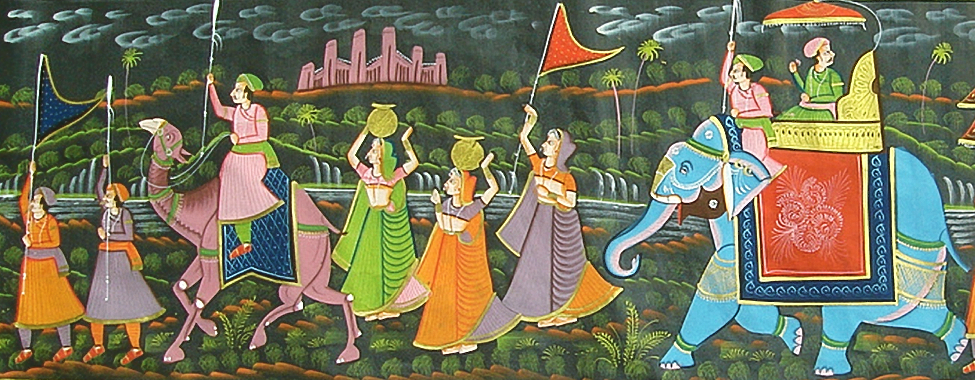

Development of Maru-Gurjar painting

- Western Indian painting style - 700 AD
- Mewar Jain painting style - 1250 AD
- Blend of Sultanate Maru-Gurjar painting style - 1550 AD
- Mewar, Marwar, Dhundar, and Harothi styles - 1585 AD

Phad paintings ("Mewar-style of painting") is the most ancient Rajasthani art form. Phad paintings, essentially a scroll painting done on cloth, are beautiful specimen of the Indian cloth paintings. These have their own styles and patterns and are very popular due to their vibrant colours and historic themes. The Phad of God Devnarayan is largest among the popular Pars in Rajasthan. The painted area of God Devnarayan Ki Phad is 170 square feet (i.e. 34' x 5'). Some other Pars are also prevalent in Rajasthan, but being of recent origin, they are not classical in composition. Another famous Par painting is Pabuji Ki Phad. Pabuji Ki Phad is painted on a 15 x 5 ft. canvas. Other famous heroes of Phad paintings are Gogaji, Prithviraj Chauhan, Amar Singh Rathore, etc.

=== Architecture ===
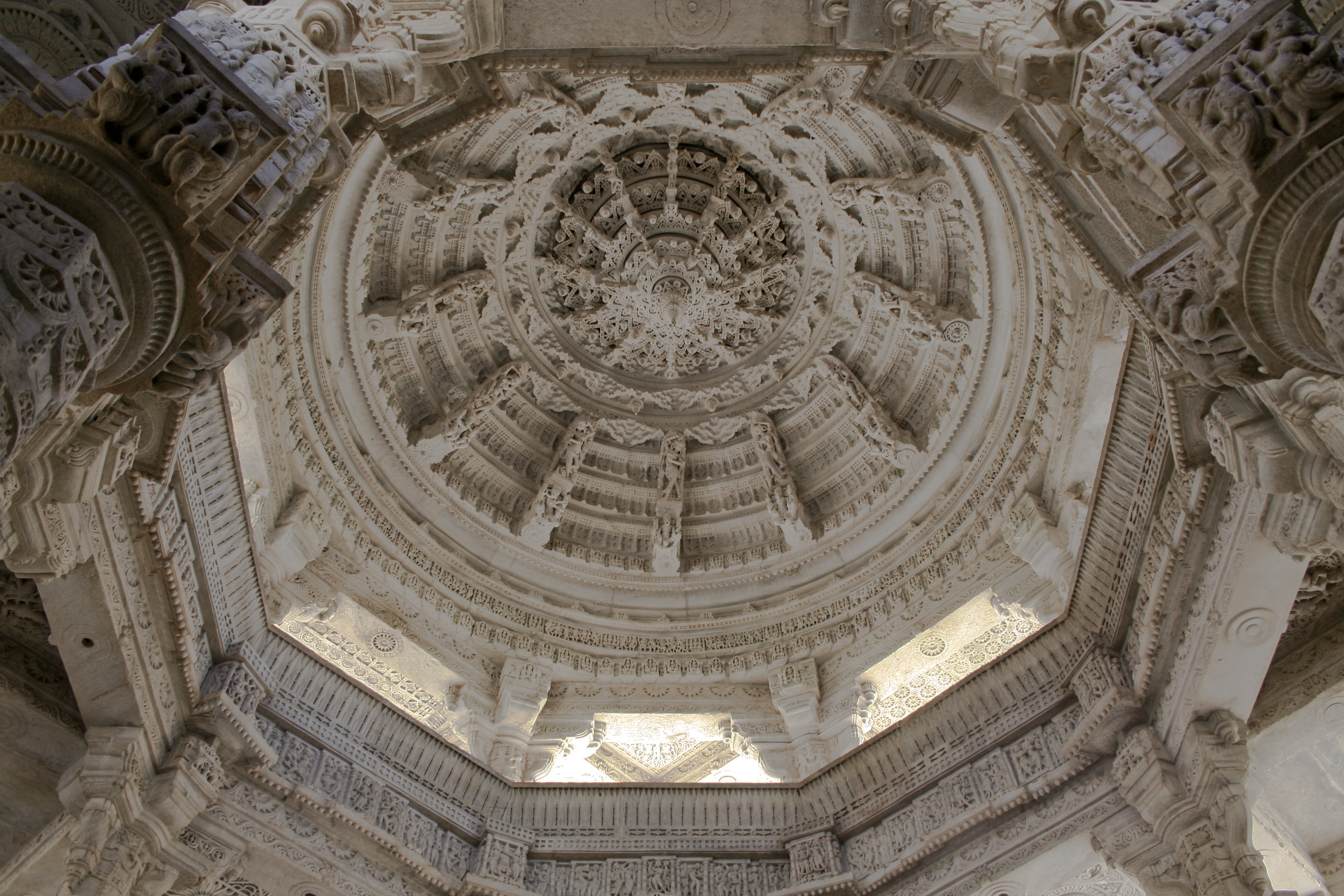
Interior shows stone work Adisvara temple

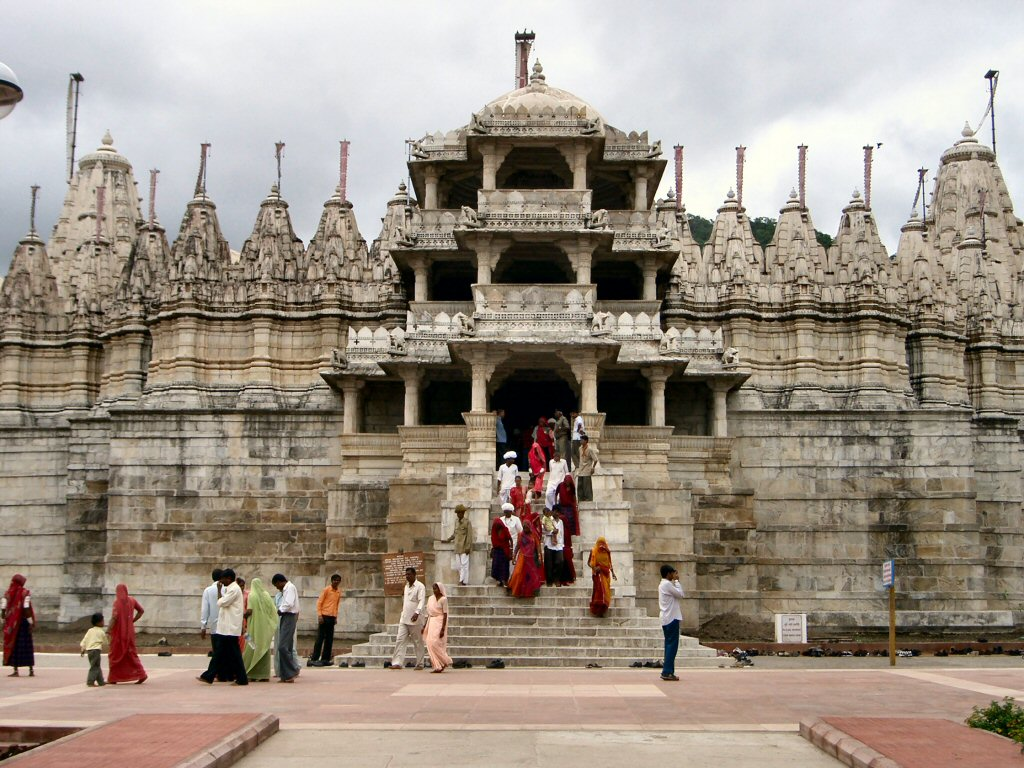
Jain temple at Ranakpur

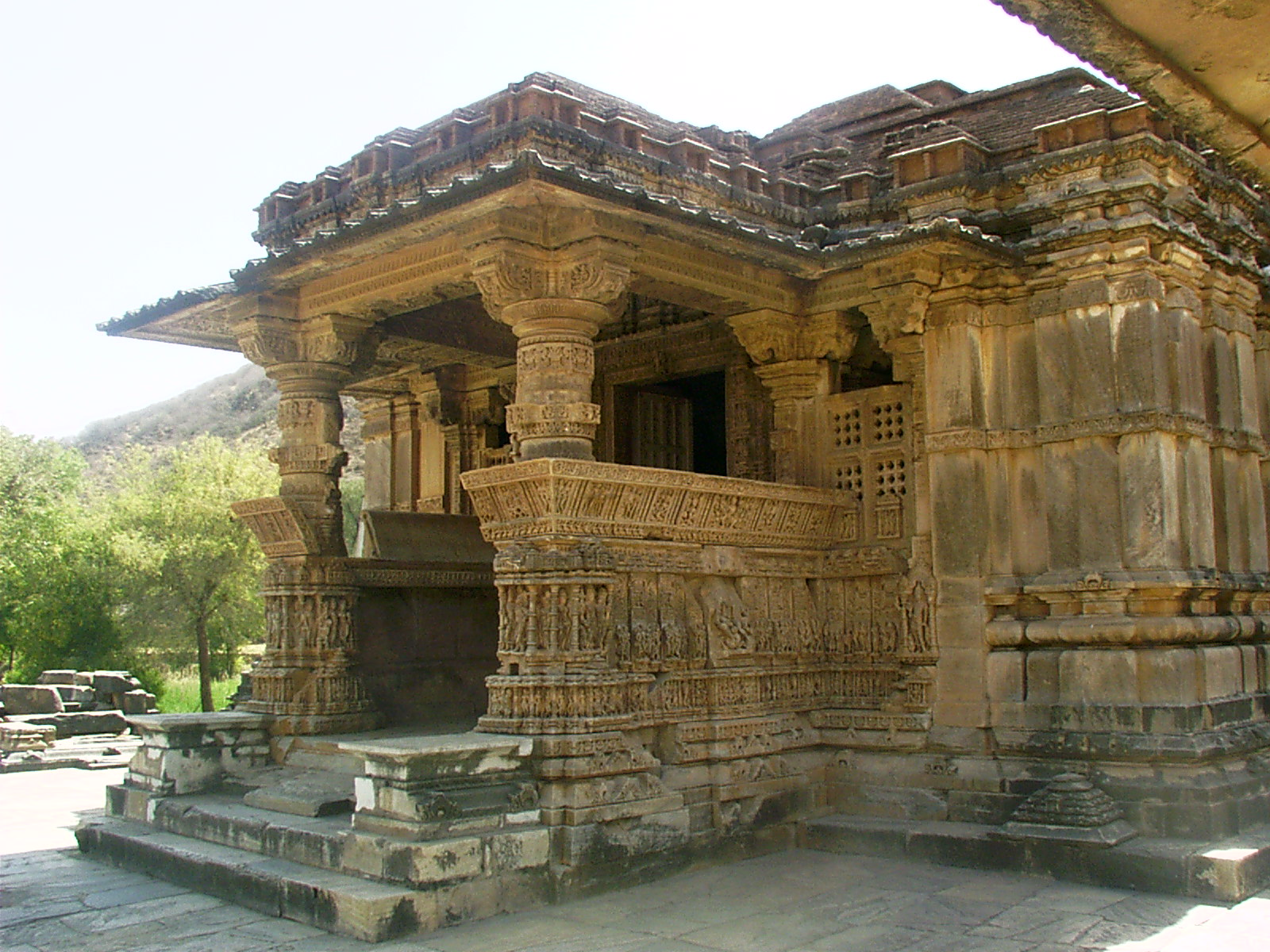
Nagda Temple

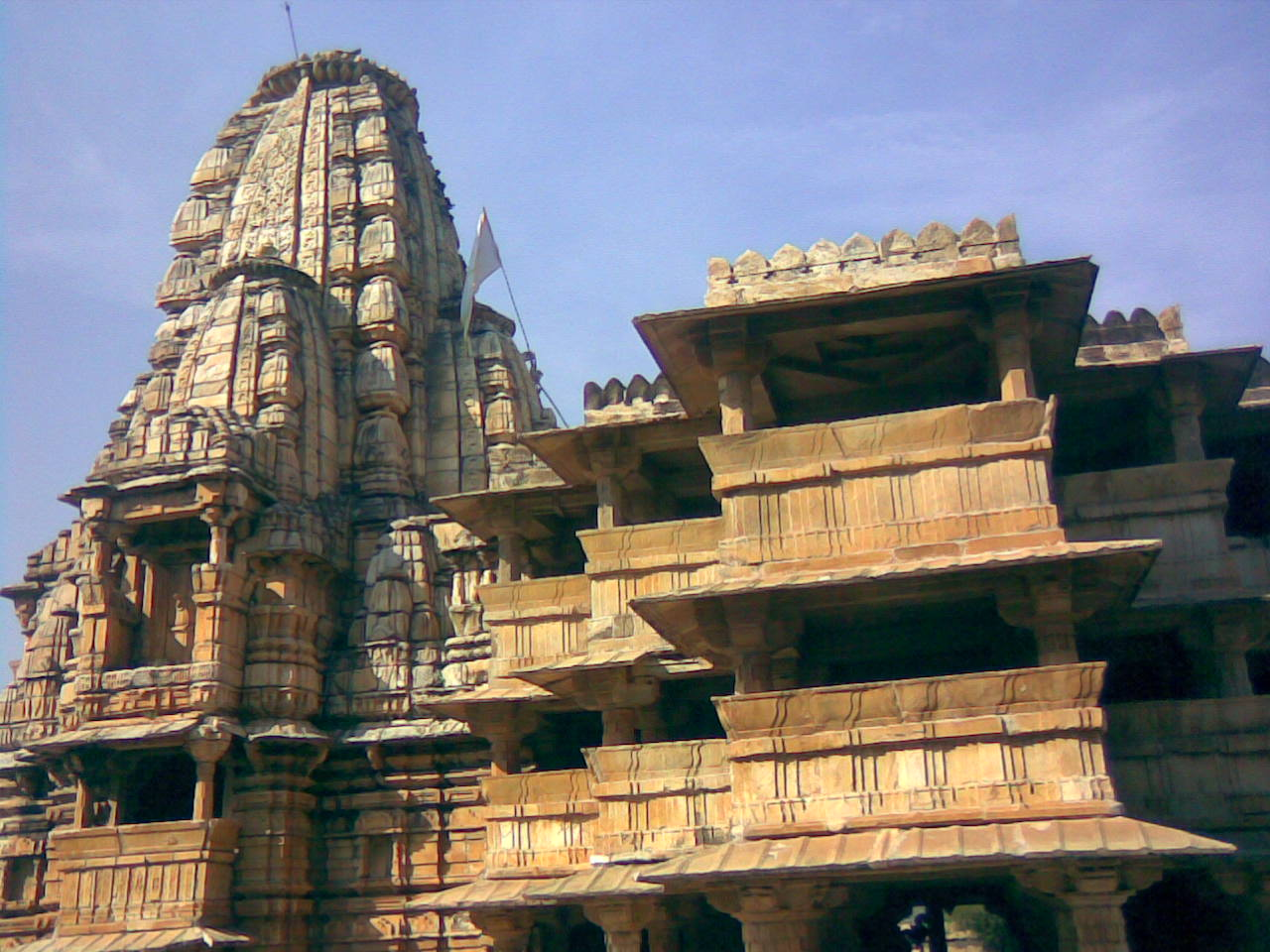
Dev Somnath Temple

The rich tradition of Rajasthanis also reflect in the architecture of the region. There is a connecting link between Māru-Gurjara architecture and Hoysala temple architecture. In both of these styles, architecture is treated sculpturally.

== Occupation ==
Agriculture is the main occupation of Rajasthani people in Rajasthan. Major crops of Rajasthan are jowar, bajri, maize, ragi, rice, wheat, barley, gram, tur, pulses, ground nut, sesamum, etc. Agriculture was the most important element in the economic life of the people of medieval Rajasthan. In early medieval times, the land that could be irrigated by one well was called Kashavah, which is a land that could be irrigated by one Knsha or leather bucket. Historically, there were a whole range of communities in Rajasthan at different stages of economy, from hunting to settled agriculture. The Van Baoria, Tirgar, Kanjar, vagri, etc. were traditionally hunters and gatherers. Now, only the Van Baoria are hunters, while others have shifted to agriculture related occupations. There are a number of artisans, such as Lohar and Sikligar. Lohar are blacksmiths while Sikligar do specific work of making and polishing of arms used in war. Now, they create tools used for agriculture.

=== Trade and business ===
Historically, Rajasthani business community (also called Marwaris, Rajasthani: मारवाड़ी) conducted business successfully throughout India and outside of India. Their business was organised around the "joint-family system", in which the grandfather, father, sons, their sons, and other family members or close relatives worked together and shared responsibilities of business work. The success of Rajasthanis in business, that too outside of Rajasthan, is the outcome of feeling of oneness within the community. Rajasthanis tend to help community members, and this strengthens the kinship bondage, oneness, and trust within community. Another fact is that they have the ability to adapt to the region they migrate. They assimilate with others so well and respect the regional culture, customs, and people. It is a rare and most revered quality for any successful businessman. Today, they are among the major business classes in India. The term Marwari has come to mean a canny businessman from the State of Rajasthan. The Bachhawats, Birlas, Goenkas, Bajajs, Ruias, Piramels and Singhanias are among the top business groups of India. They are the famous marwaris from Rajasthan.

== Diaspora ==
The Marwari group of Rajasthanis have a substantial diaspora throughout India, where they have been established as traders. Marwari migration to the rest of India is essentially a movement in search of opportunities for trade and commerce. In most cases, Rajasthanis migrate to other places as traders.

=== Maharashtra ===
In Maharashtra, Rajasthanis are mainly merchants and own large to mid-sized business houses. Maheshwaris are mainly Hindus (some are also Jains), who migrated from Rājputāna in the olden days. They usually worship all Gods and Goddesses along with their village deities.

== Images ==
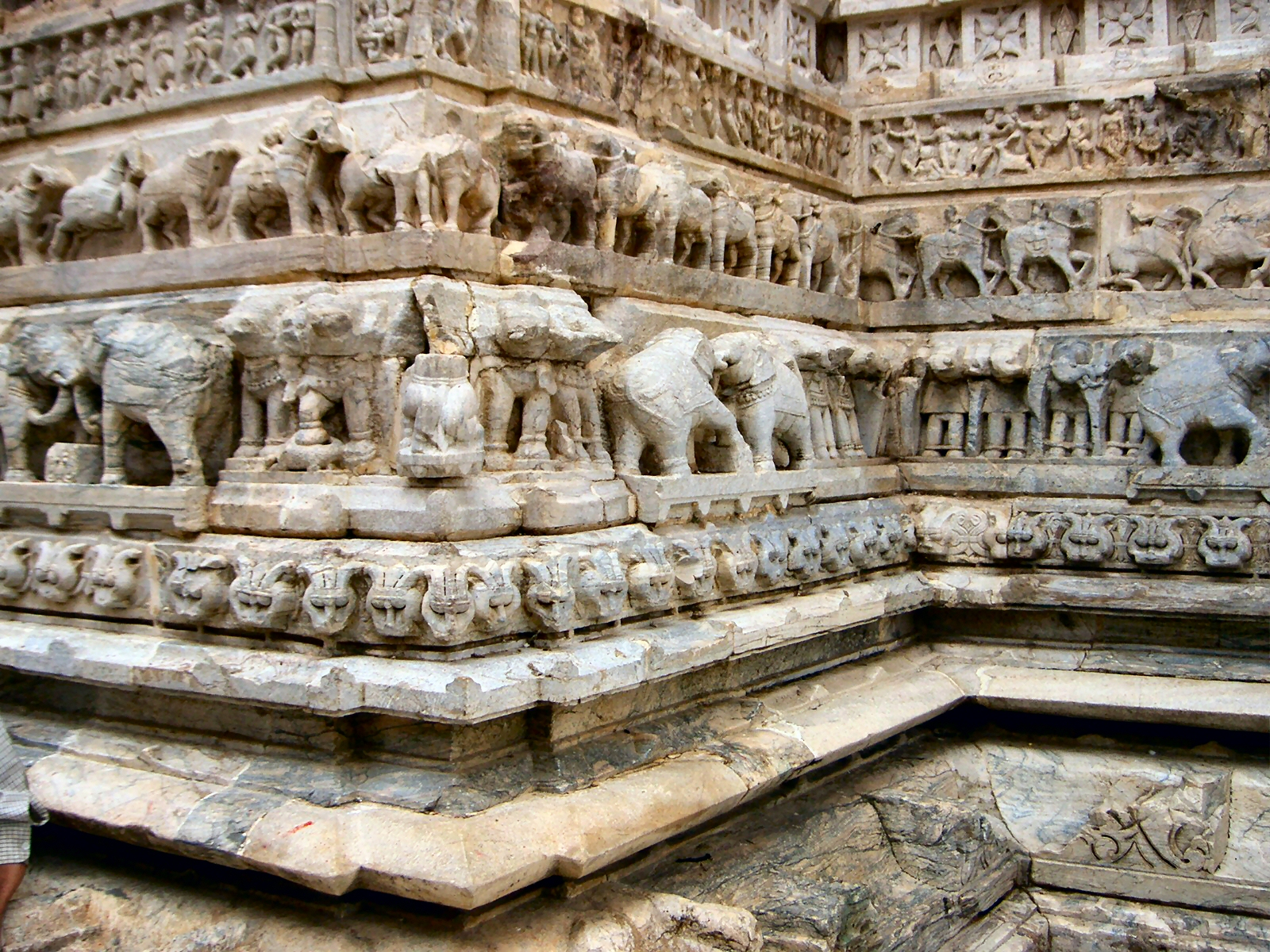
Carved elephants on the walls of Jagdish Temple that was built by Maharana Jagat Singh Ist in 1651 A.D.

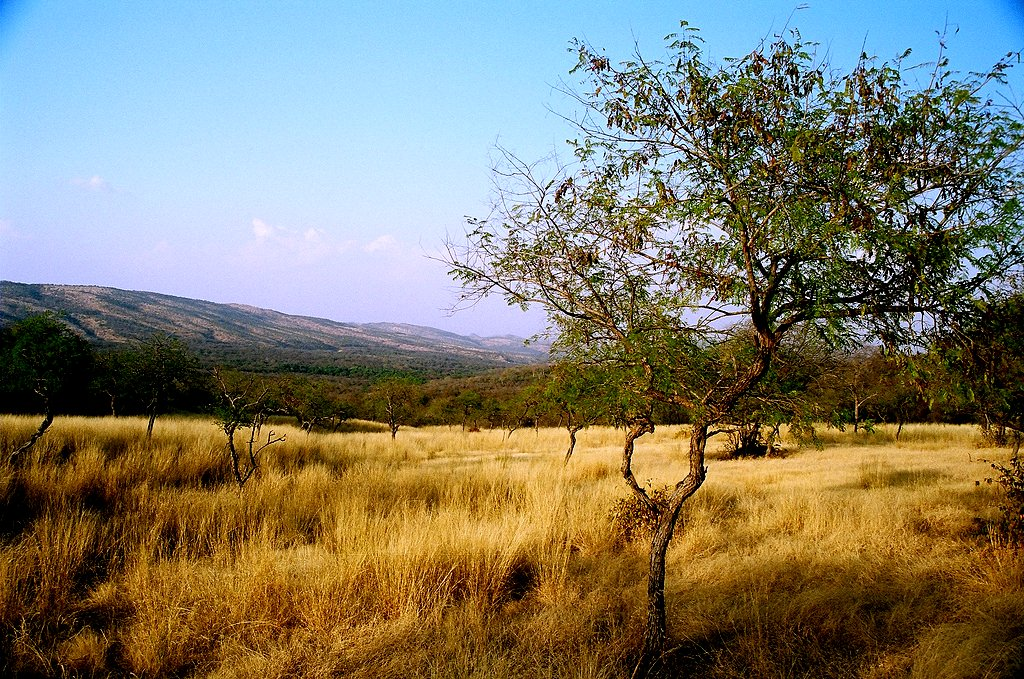
The region surrounding Aravalli hills near Ranthambore, Rajasthan, India.

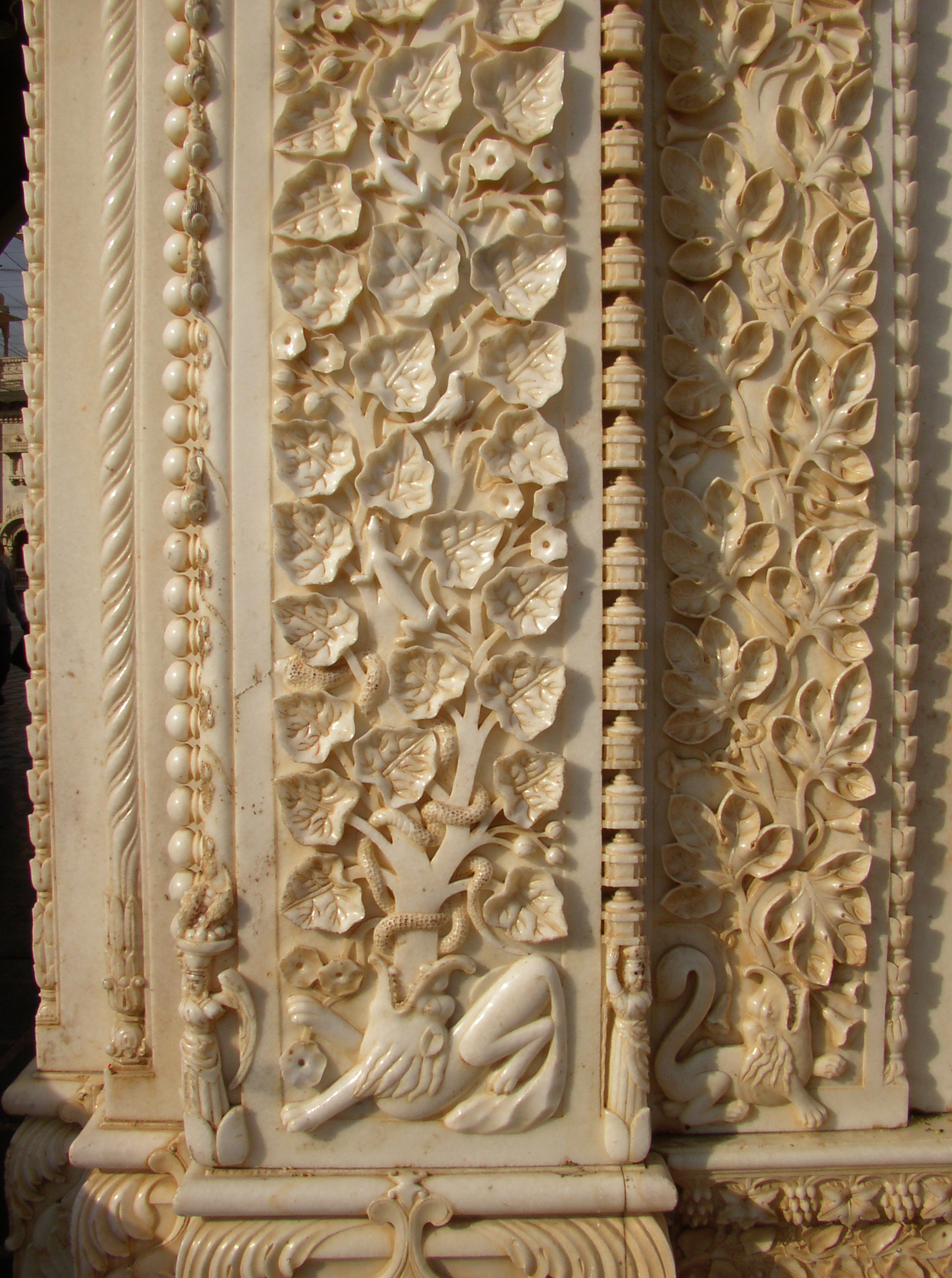
Detailed stone work, Karni Mata Temple, Bikaner Rajasthan.

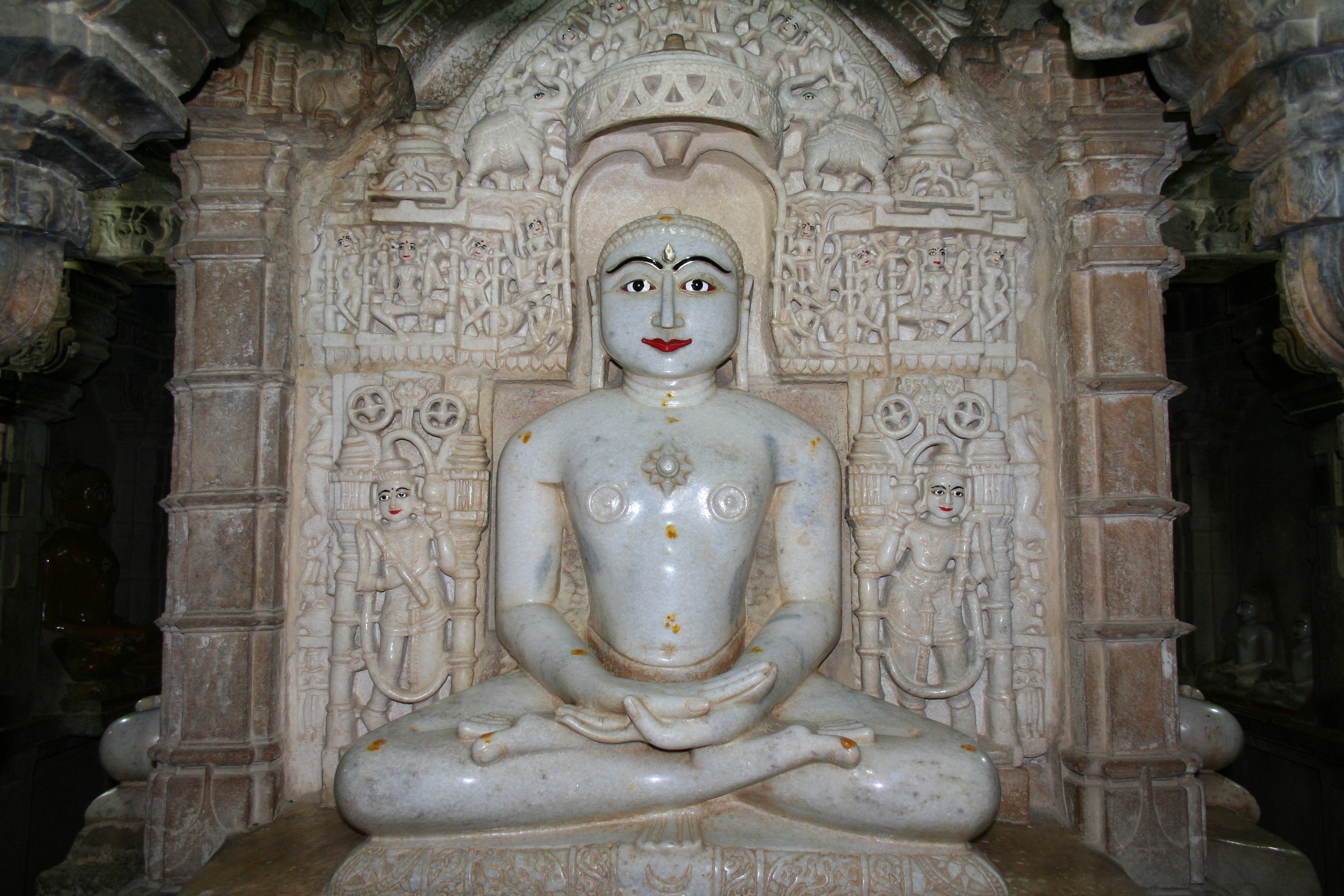
Marble stone work, Jaisalmer Jain Temple, Rajasthan.

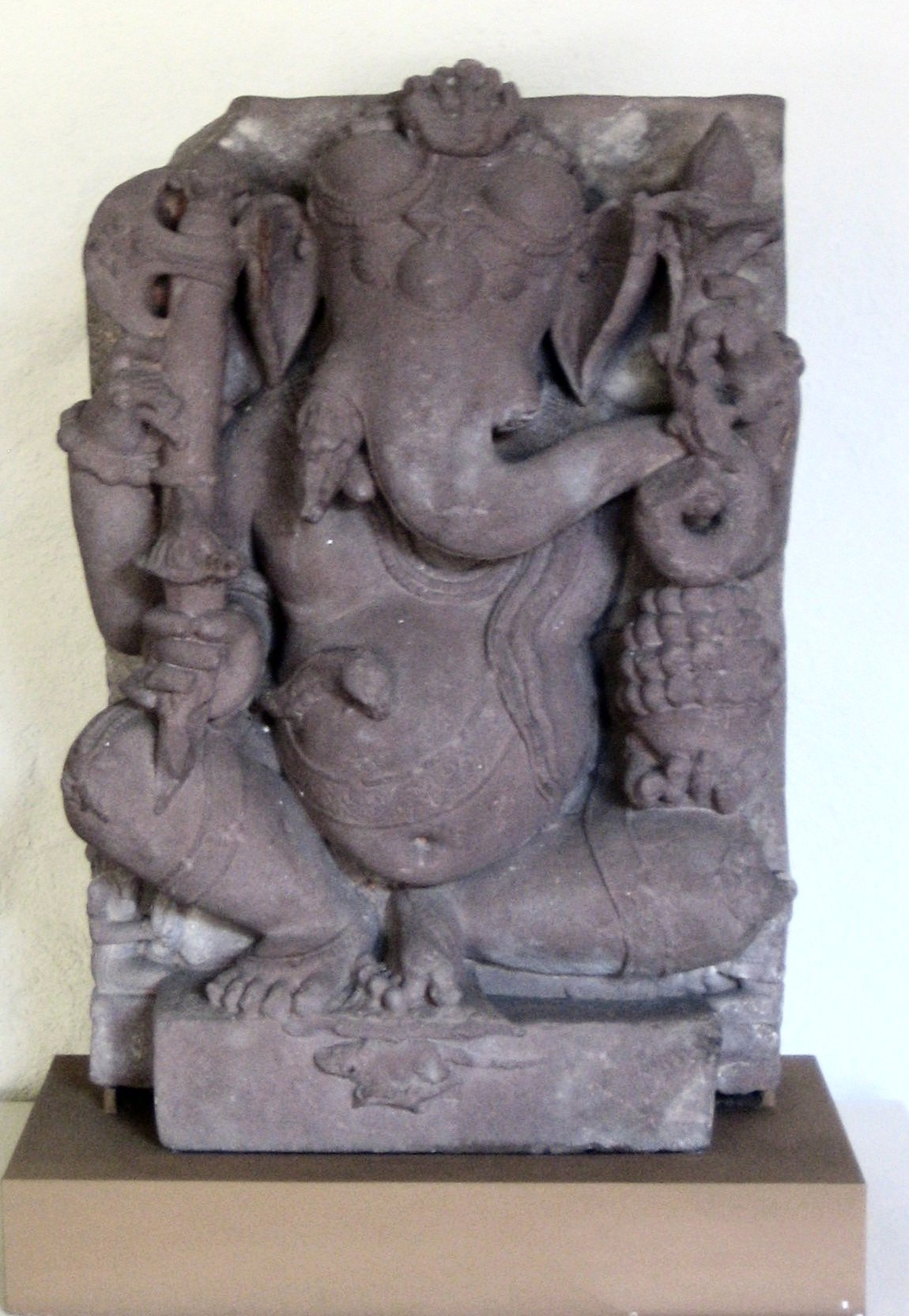
Seated Ganesha, sandstone sculpture from Rajasthan, India, 9th century, Honolulu Academy of Arts.

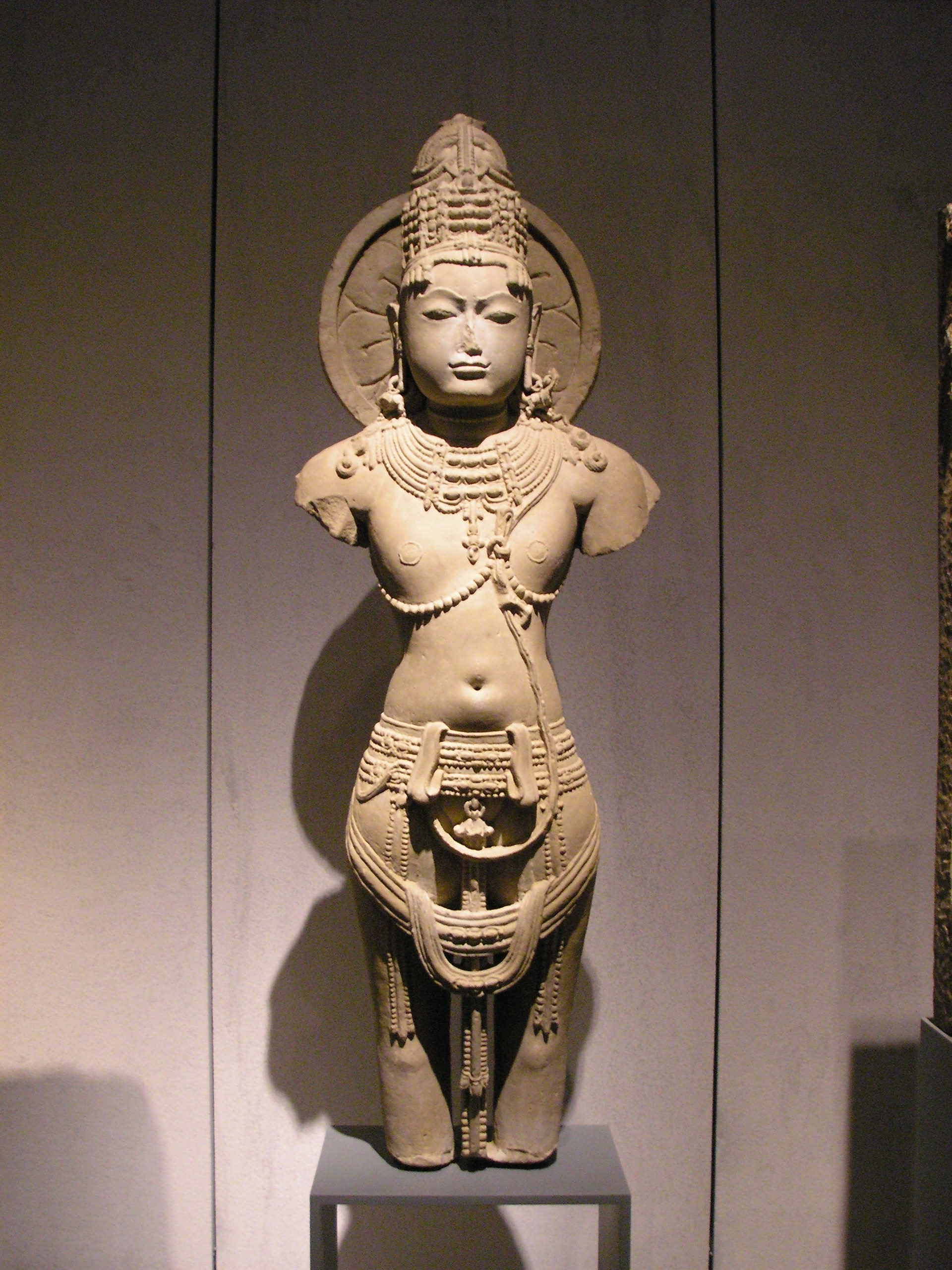
Yellow sandstone sculpture of a standing deity, 11th century CE, Rajasthan.

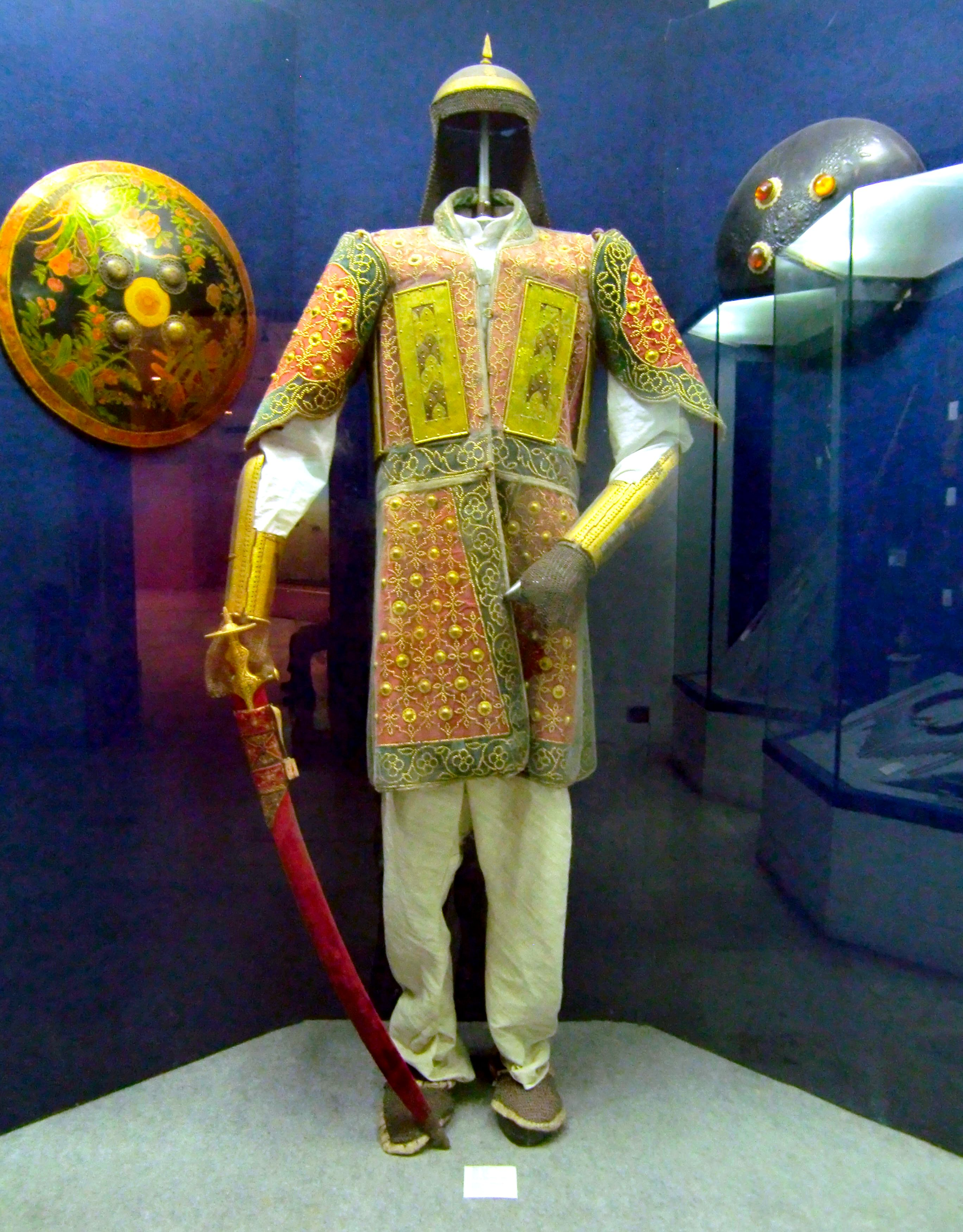
Armor coat, 18th century, Rajasthan.

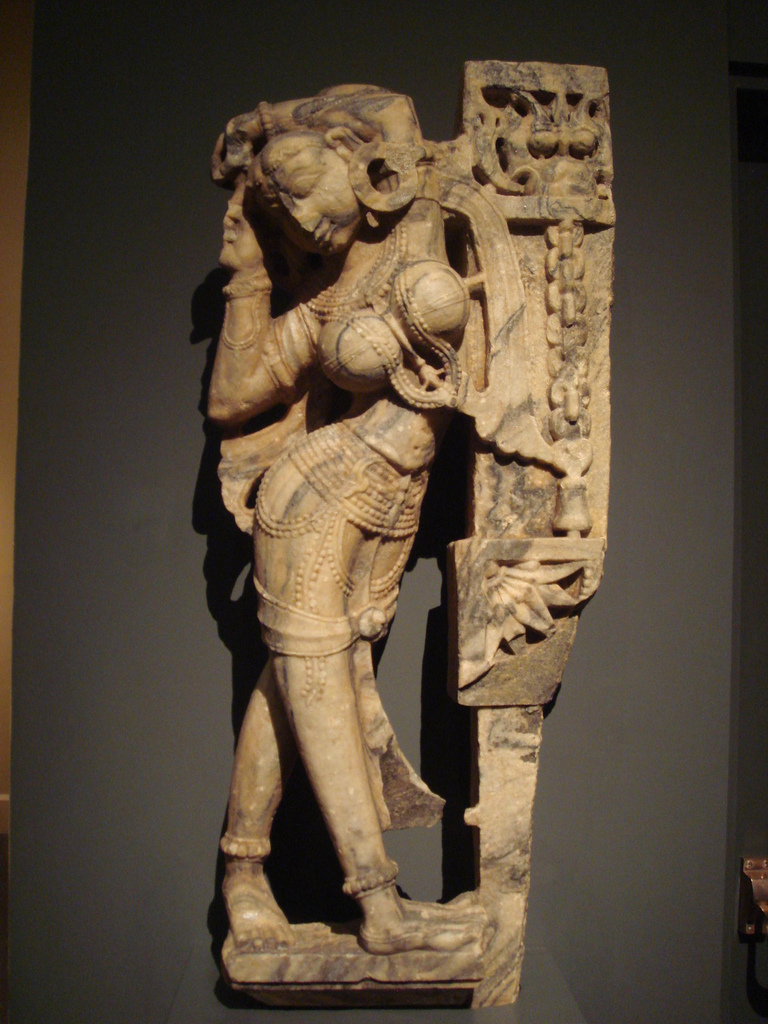
Marble sculpture of a female, ca 1450, Rajasthan.

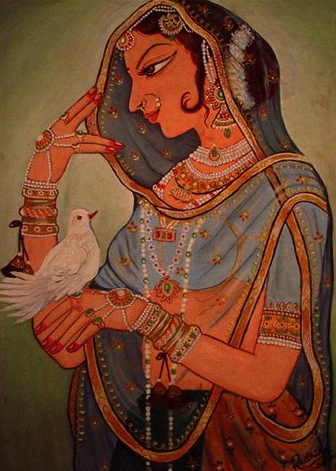
Bani Thani painting, Rajasthan.

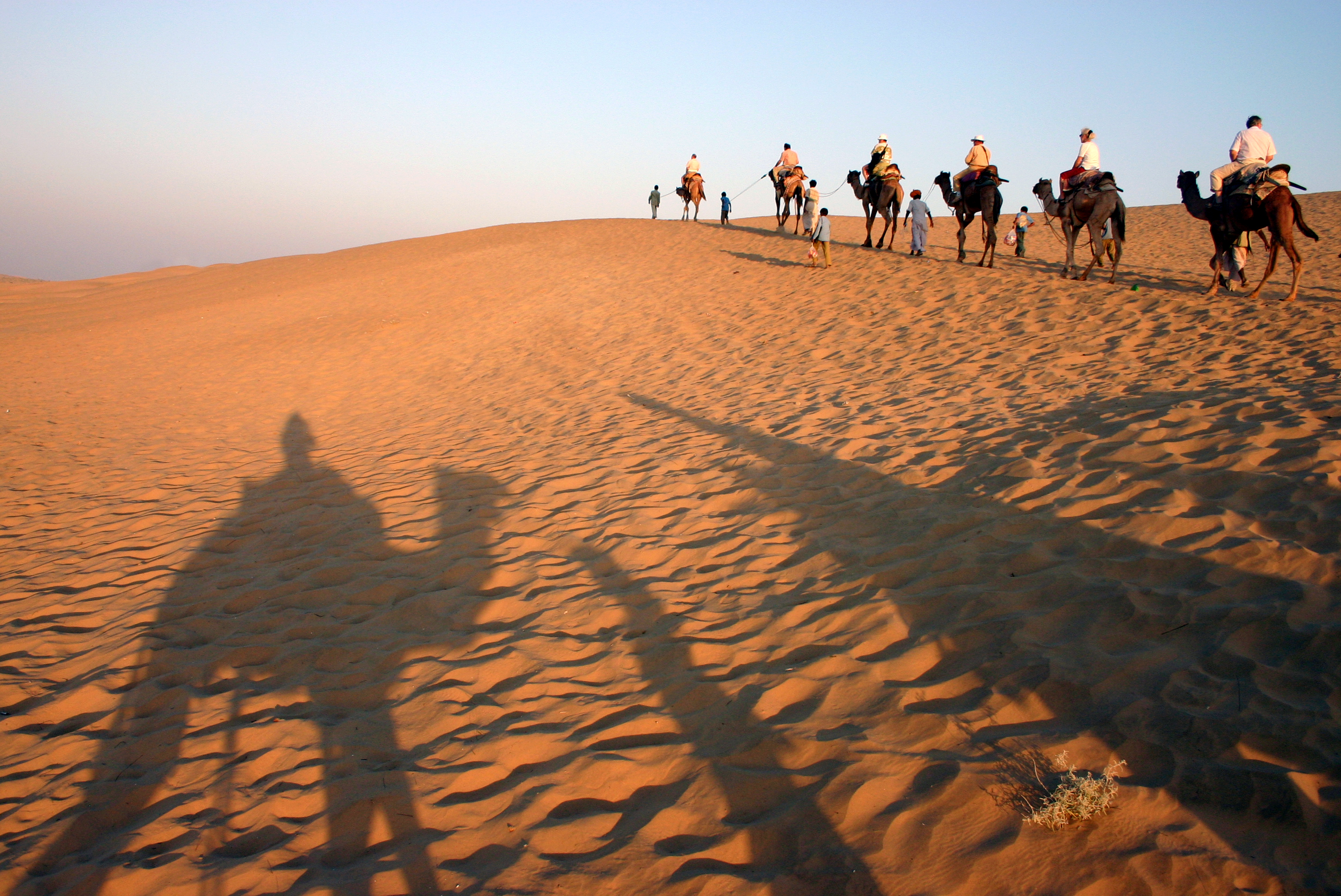
Camel ride in sand dunes, Thar desert, Jaisalmer.

== See also ==
- List of people from Rajasthan
- Culture of Rajasthan
- Mandore
- Suthar
- Kathputli (Puppet)
