= Chauhan Victoria Vada =

Food stall in Kolkata, India

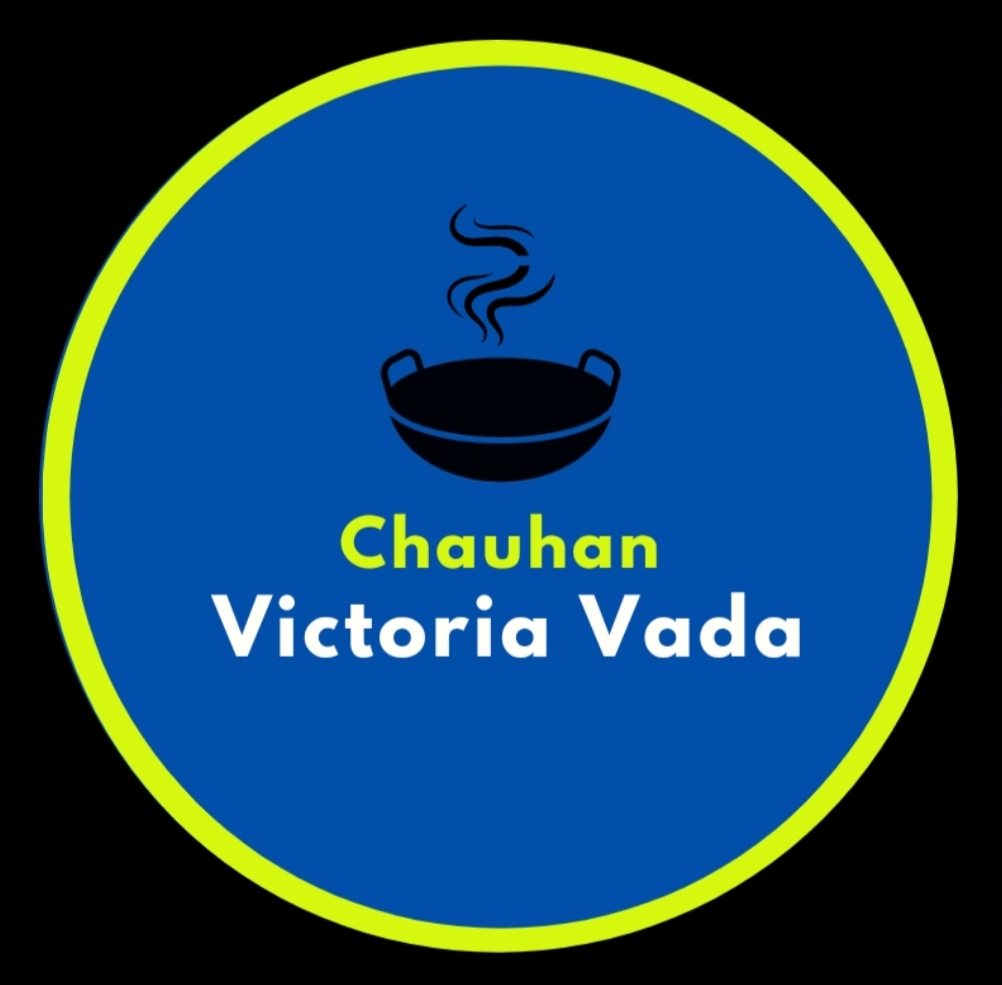

Chauhan Victoria Vada is a food stall located in the Camac Street Vardaan Market in the city of Kolkata.

The stall was started by Badrinath Chauhan in 1950, who came from Jaunpur district in Uttar Pradesh. His son Rajendra Prasad Chauhan managed this stall for three decades and currently his Grandsons Anurag, Pankaj, Abhinav, and Deepak Chauhan run this business. Before coming to this location, the stall was located in the front of the Victoria Memorial.

They are known for their Victoria Vada, a snack similar to Rajasthani daal ka vada. It was a popular snack among British residents during the post colonial period. In 2013, British Prime Minister David Cameron visited the stall to sample this dish.
