= Aai Mata =

Believed to be an incarnation of the goddess Ambe Maa

The History of Shri Aai Mata Ji

Shri Aai Mata ji (Hindi Pronunciation: श्री आई माता जी; 1472 to 1561 in Vikram Samvat or 1415 to 1504 in Gregorian calendar) is believed to be an incarnation of the goddess, Ambe Maa (Jagdambe Maa, Hindi: अम्बे माता जी का अवतार).

== History ==
Jiji (जीजी) was the birth name of Shri Aai Mata Ji. She was born to Bikaji (Father) in the Ambapur village (now Ambaji, Gujarat).

== Temple at Narlai, Rajasthan ==
Shri Aai Mata Ji temple in Narlai is located at Aai mata road, Narlai, Rajasthan 306703, India

== Temple at Bilara, Rajasthan ==
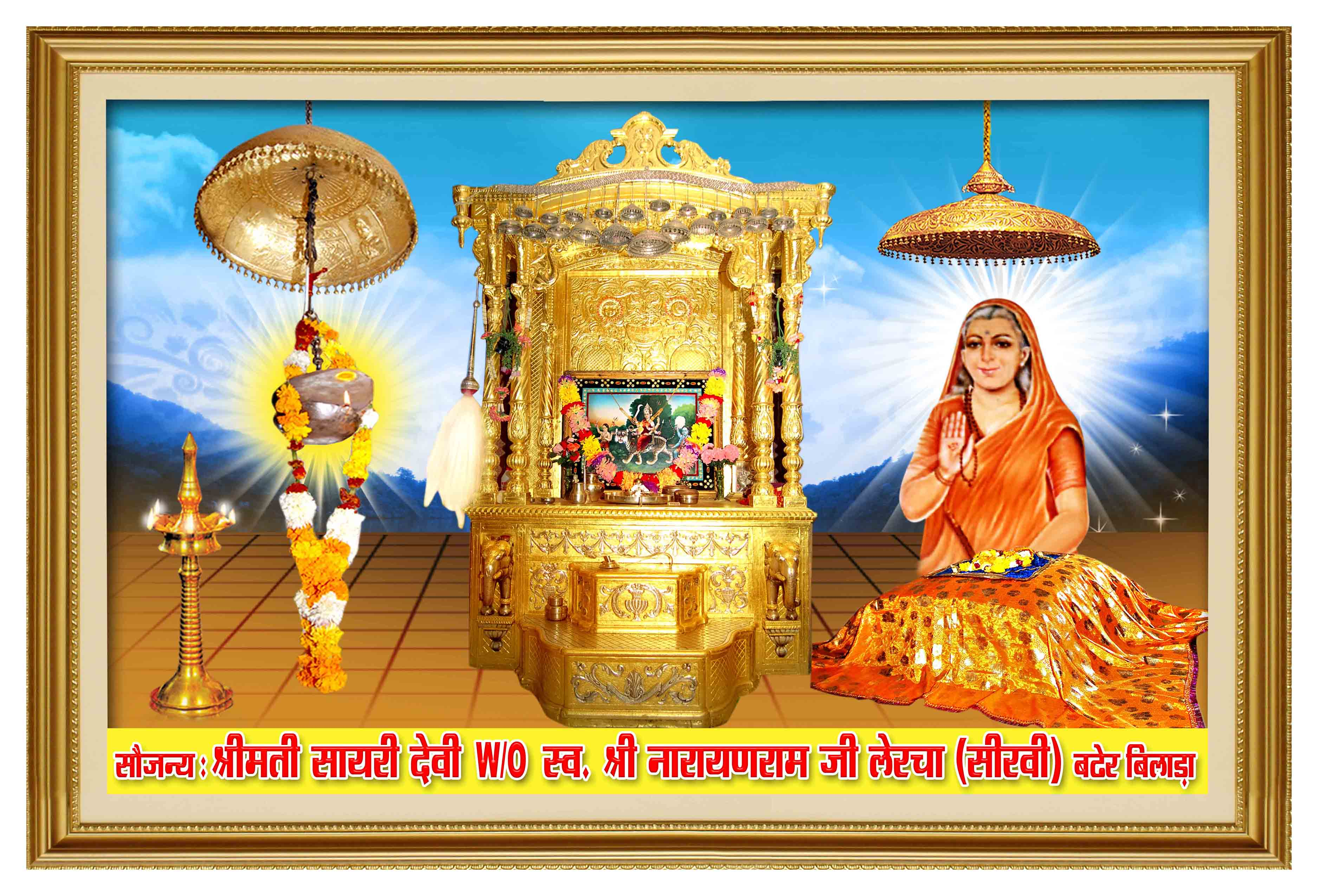
Shri Aai Mata Ji Temple in Bilara, Jodhpur district, Rajasthan, India

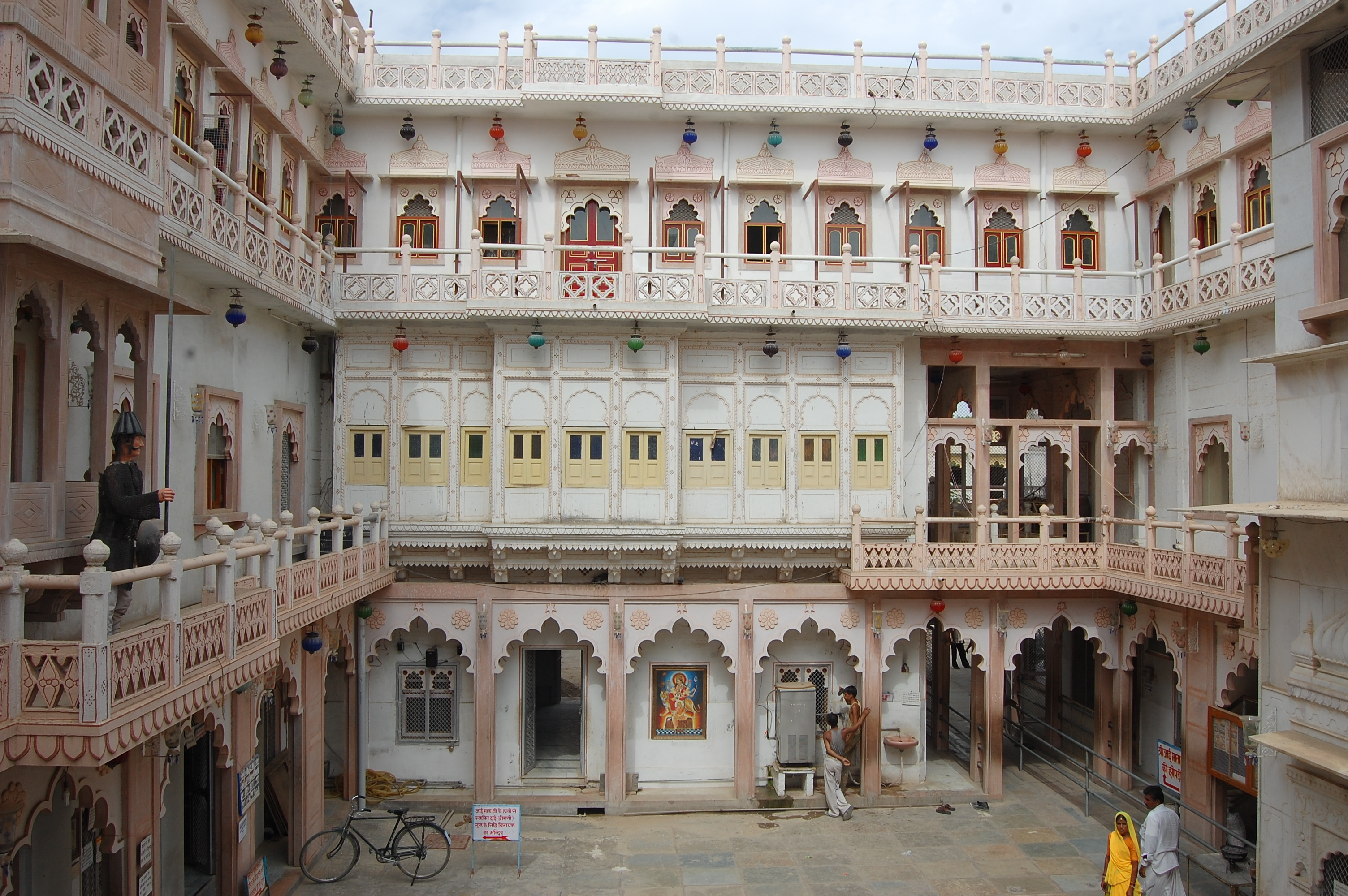
Aai Mata ji Temple Bilara RAjasthan

Shri Aai Mata Ji temple in Bilara is located at Bader Rd, Bilara, Rajasthan 342602, India
