= Kumawat =

Caste clan of India

Kumawat is a caste clan of India.

Most of them are concentrated in Marwar region. They are also known by the names Maru Kumawat, Mewari Kumawat. The National Commission for Backward Classes has kept both the Kumhar and Kumawat castes separately but together in the same row in the Central List of Other Backward Classes of the state of Rajasthan.

== Notables ==
- Shobha Ram Kumawat (former Raj PCC Chief)
- M. L. Kumawat (former DG of BSF)
- Joraram Kumawat (MLA)
- Nirmal Kumawat (MLA)
