= Kumhar =

Caste in India and Pakistan

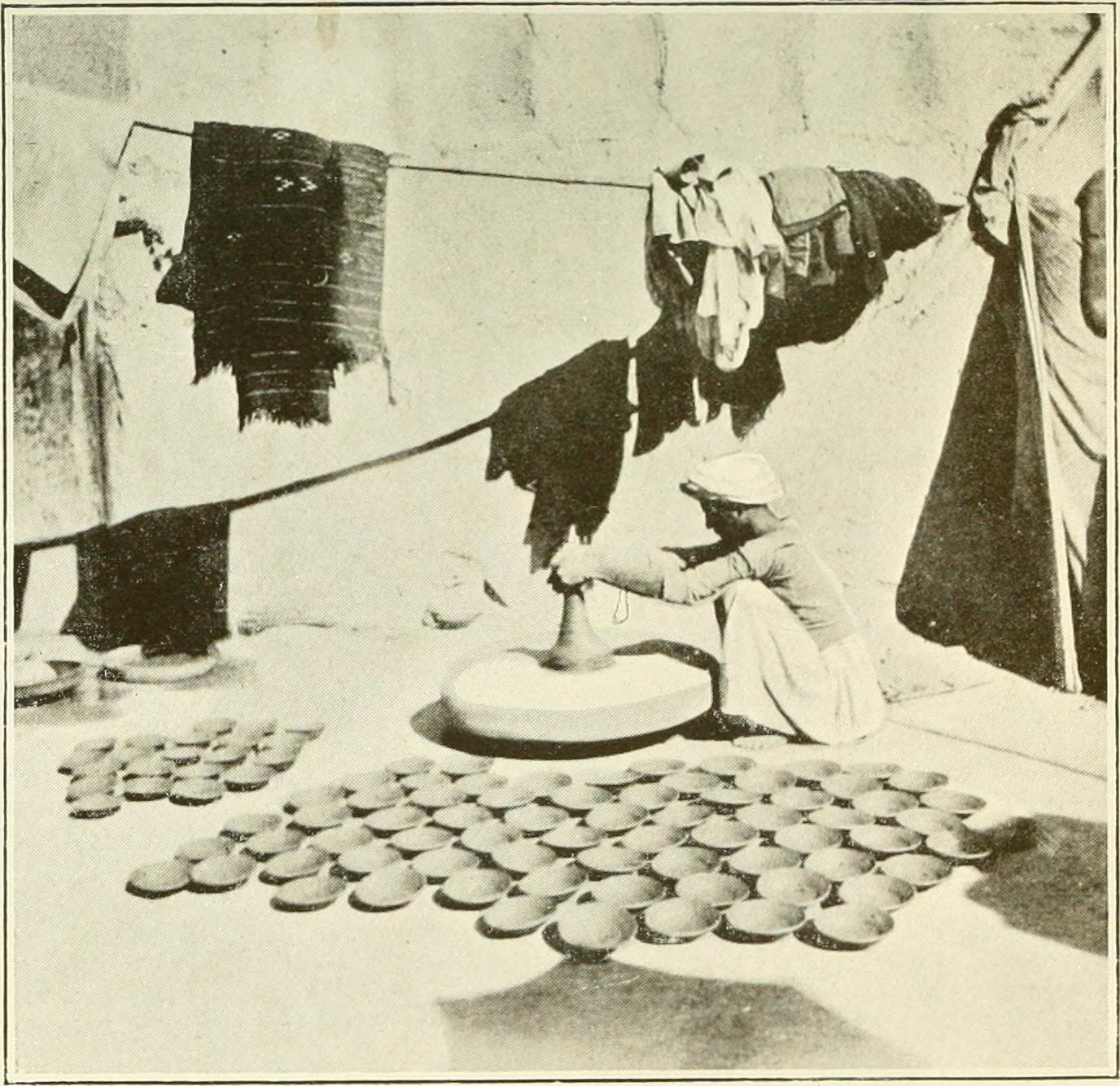
- Classification: Other Backward Class
- Religions: Hinduism; Islam; Sikhism; Buddhism
- Languages: Hindi, Sindhi, Rajasthani, Haryanvi, Awadhi, Bhojpuri, Gujarati, Marathi, Nagpuri, Odia, Bengali, Punjabi, Urdu, Nepali
- Country: India, Nepal, Bangladesh, Pakistan
- Region: South Asia
- Population: ~55–60 million (c. 2009/10)
- Related groups: Lohar; Khati

Kumhar or Kumbhar is a caste or community in India, Nepal, Bangladesh and Pakistan. Kumhars have historically been associated with the art of pottery.

== Etymology ==
The Kumhars derive their name from the Sanskrit word Kumbhakar meaning earthen-pot maker. Dravidian languages conform to the same meaning of the term Kumbhakar. The term Bhande, used to designate the Kumhar caste, also means pot. The potters of Amritsar are called Kulal or Kalal, the term used in Yajurveda to denote the potter class.

== Mythological origin ==
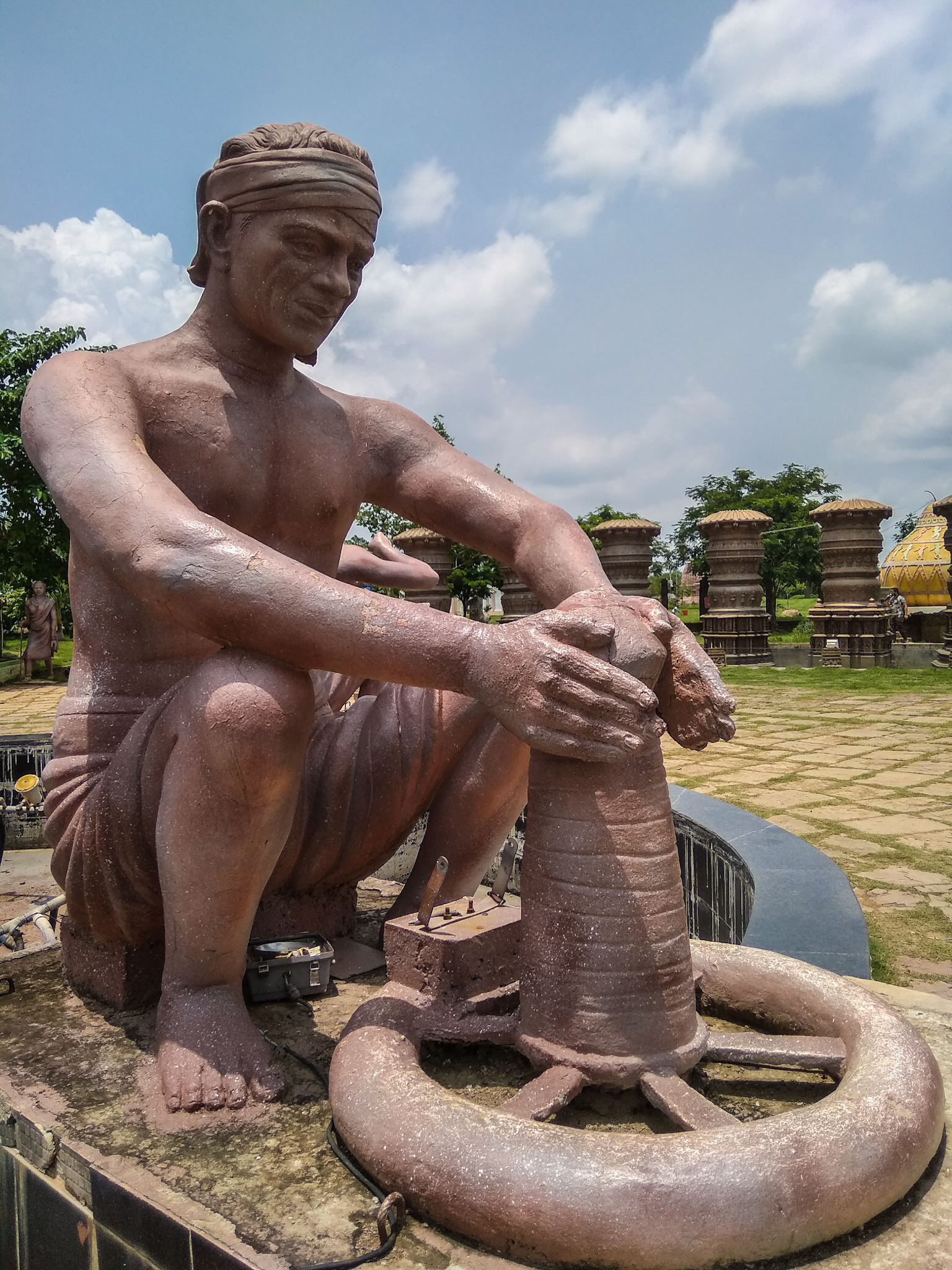
Depiction of a Kumhar at a potter's wheel.

A section of Hindu Kumhars honorifically call themselves Prajapati after Vedic Prajapati, the Lord, who they believe created the universe.

According to a legend prevalent among Kumhars

Once Brahma divided sugarcane among his sons and each of them ate his share, but the Kumhara who was greatly absorbed in his work, forgot to eat. The piece which he had kept near his clay lump struck root and soon grew into a sugarcane plant. A few days later, when Brahma asked his sons for sugarcane, none of them could give it to him, excepting the Kumhara who offered a full plant. Brahma was pleased by the devotion of the potter to his work and awarded him the title Prajapati.

There is an opinion that this is because of their traditional creative skills of pottery, they are regarded as Prajapati.

== Divisions ==
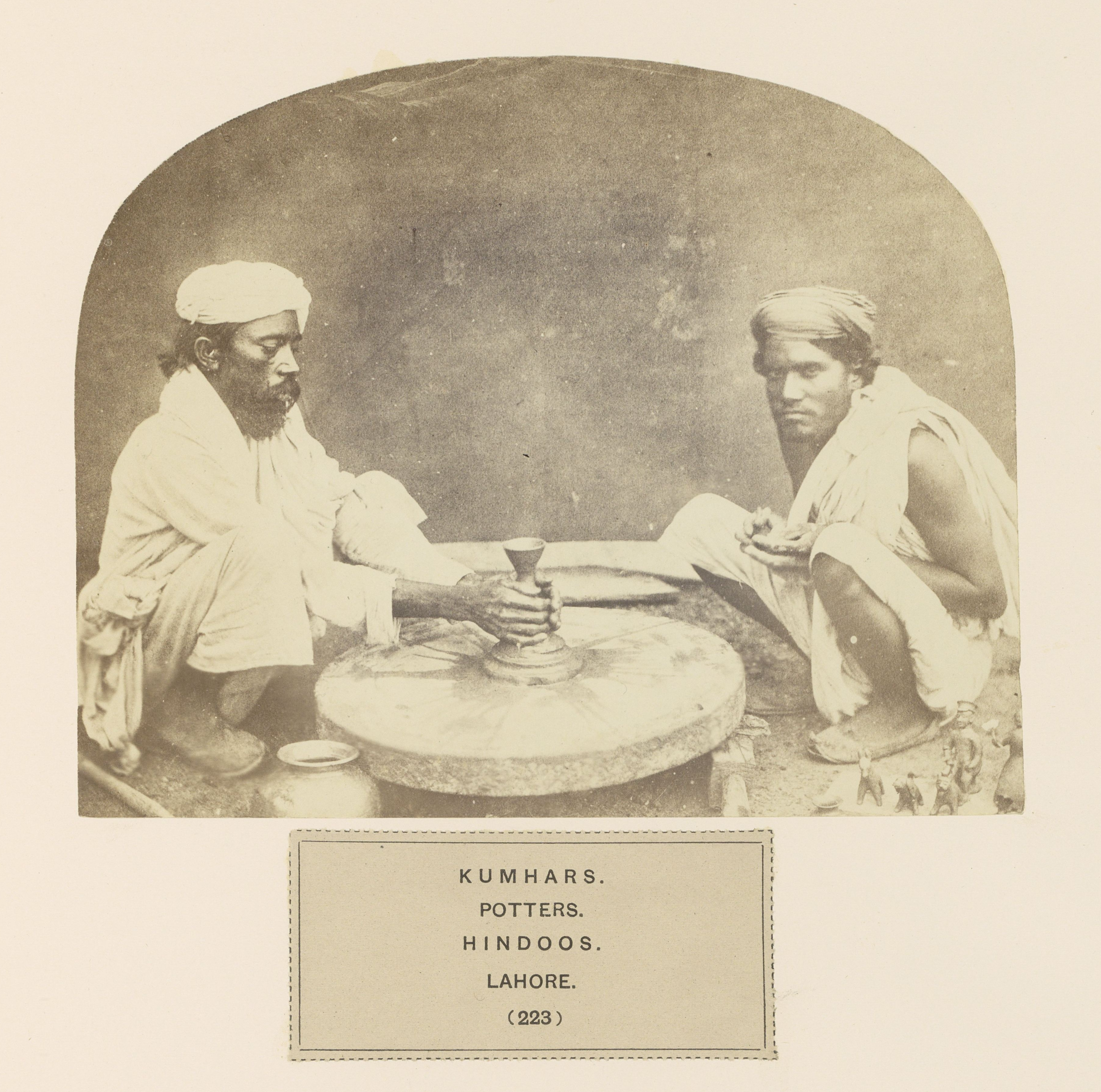
Portrait of two unknown Kumhar potters from Lahore, ca.1859–69

The potters are classified into Hindu and Muslim cultural groups. Among Hindus, inclusion of artisan castes, such as potters, in the Shudra varna is indisputable. They are further divided into two groups-clean caste and unclean caste.

Among the Kumhars are groups such as the Gujrati Kumhar, Kurali ke Kumhar, Lad, Haral and Telangi. They all, bear these names after different cultural linguistic zones or caste groups but are termed as one caste cluster.

=== Regional Variations ===
(According to the 1879 Settlement Report of Sirsa and the 1915 Gazetteer of Ferozepur, many Kumhars in these districts were dedicated to agriculture, with some villages entirely owned and cultivated by them. Known for their agricultural expertise, they were considered comparable to Bagri Jats in physique, dress, and habits. Concentrated around Abohar, they were officially recognized as "Bagri Kumhars" for their significant contributions to farming.)

== Distribution in India ==
=== Punjab ===
In Punjab, Kumhars belongs to Hinduism & Sikhism. In ancient times pottery being their occupation. But many hundred years ago, they shifted to Farming occupation. Most of them have their own land. They are considered as a decent caste in Punjab. They follow endogamy with clan exogamy. These Kumhars are also called as Bagri Kumhars or Maru Kumhars. They belong to a distinct tribe, separate from other Kumhars.

=== Rajasthan ===
In Rajasthan, Kumhars (also known as Prajapat) have six sub-groups namely Mathera, Kheteri, Marwara, Timria and Mawalia. In the social hierarchy of Rajasthan, they are placed in the middle of the higher castes and the Harijans. They follow endogamy with clan exogamy. The National Commission for Backward Classes has kept both the Kumhar and Kumawat castes separately but together in the same row in the Central List of Other Backward Classes of the state of Rajasthan.

=== Jharkhand ===
The number of Kumhars speaking Bengali language here is more than other Kumhars. The sub-castes of Kumhars found here are- Khuntakati Kumhars and Prajapati Kumhars. Khuntkati Kumhars are the original inhabitants of this place and their popular surnames are - Pal, Bhagat, Kumbhar, Bera, Pradhan and Chaudhary.

=== Chamba (Himanchal) ===
The Kumhars of Chamba are expert in making pitchers, Surahis, vessels, grain jars, toys for entertainment and earthen lamps. Some of these pots bear paintings and designs also.

=== Maharashtra (Marathe) ===
Kumhars are found in Satara, Sangli, Kolhapur, Sholapur and Pune. Their language is Marathi. They use Devnagari script for communication. There are Kumbhars who do not belong to Maratha clan lives in Maharashtra and have occupation of making idols and pots.

=== Madhya Pradesh ===
Hathretie and Chakretie (or Challakad) Kumhars are found in Madhya Pradesh. Hathretie Kumhars are called so because they traditionally moved the "chak" (potter's wheel) by hands ("hath"). They are listed among Other Backward Classes in the state.

=== Odisha and Bengal ===
In Bengal Kumhars are one of the ceremonially pure castes. In Odisha they are two types (Odia Kumbhar and Jhadua Kumbhar) who provide vessels for the rice distribution to Jagannath temple. They are classified as Other Backward Classes in the state of Odisha.

=== Uttar Pradesh and Bihar ===
The Kannuaja Kumhars are considered to be a decent caste in both Bihar and Uttar Pradesh. Although they sometimes use the term Pandit as their surname. The Magahiya Kumhars are treated little inferior to the Kanaujias and the Turkaha (Gadhere). They belong to other backward classes.

=== Gujarat ===
Kumhars are listed among the Other Backward Classes of Gujarat, where they are listed with the following communities: Prajapati (Gujjar Prajapati, Varia Prajapati, Sorthia Prajapati), Sorathiya Prajapati.

== Kumhars in Nepal ==
The Central Bureau of Statistics of Nepal classifies the Kumhar as a subgroup within the broader social group of Madheshi Other Caste. At the time of the 2011 Nepal census, 62,399 people (0.2% of the population of Nepal) were Kumhar. The frequency of Kumhars by province was as follows:

- Madhesh Province (1.0%)
- Koshi Province (0.1%)
- Lumbini Province (0.1%)
- Bagmati Province (0.0%)
- Gandaki Province (0.0%)
- Sudurpashchim Province (0.0%)
- Karnali Province (0.0%)

The frequency of Kumhars was higher than national average (0.2%) in the following districts:

- Rautahat (1.8%)
- Bara (1.5%)
- Sarlahi (1.4%)
- Dhanusha (1.0%)
- Saptari (0.9%)
- Mahottari (0.6%)
- Parsa (0.6%)
- Banke (0.3%)
- Siraha (0.3%)

== See also ==
- Pottery
- Kumal people
- Nizamabad black clay pottery
