= List of Christian mission hospitals =

The following is a list of mission hospitals.

== Afghanistan ==
- CURE International Hospital of Kabul

== Bangladesh ==
- Christian Missionary Hospital, Brahmanbaria
- LAMB Integrated Rural Health & Development Project, Parbatipur
- Christian Missionary Hospital, Rajshahi
- Memorial Christian Hospital, Cox's Bazar
- DBLM, The Leprosy Mission, Nilphamari, India
- Christian Missionary Hospital, Comilla
- Fatima Hospital, Jessore

== Dominican Republic ==
- Centro de Ortopedia y Especialidades CURE International

== Ethiopia ==
- CURE Ethiopia Children's Hospital
- Myungsung Christian Medical Center

== Ghana ==
- Baptist Medical Centre

== India ==
Hospitals of Emmanuel Hospital Association

- Baptist Christian Hospital, Tezpur, Assam
- Broadwell Christian Hospital, Hariharganj, Fatehpur, Uttar Pradesh
- Champa Christian Hospital, Champa, Chhattisgarh
- Chinchpada Christian Hospital, Chinchpada, Nandurbar, Maharashtra
- Duncan Hospital, Raxaul, East Champaran, Bihar
- Harriet Benson Memorial Hospital, Lalitpur, Uttar Pradesh
- Herbertpur Christian Hospital, Herbertpur, Dehradun, Uttarakhand
- Jivan Jyoti Christian Hospital, Robertsganj, Uttar Pradesh
- Kachhwa Christian Hospital, Kachhwa, Mirzapur, Uttar Pradesh
- Landour Community Hospital, Mussoorie, Uttarakhand
- Makunda Christian Leprosy & General Hospital, Makunda, Karimganj, Assam
- Prem Jyoti Community Hospital, Barharwa, Jharkhand

Hospitals of MarThoma Medical Mission

- Ashram Hospital, Darshani, Sihora, Madhya Pradesh
- C.M. Ashram Hospital, Ankola, North Canara, Karnataka
- Fellowship Mission Hospital, Kumbanad, Pathanamthitta, Kerala
- Hoskote Mission & Medical Centre, Hoskote, Bangalore, Karnataka
- Mar Thoma Mission Hospital, Chungathara, Malappuram, Kerala
- St. Thomas Mission Hospital & Institute of Medical Sciences, Kattanam, Alappuzha, Kerala

Hospitals of Catholic Church

- St. Martin De Porres Hospital, Cherukunnu, Kannur, Kerala

Hospitals of ERBHS

ERBHS (Eastern Regional Board of Health Services) runs hospitals in Central India belonging to the Church of North India. This independent governing body provides health care for all. It oversees the following hospitals:

- Christian Hospital Baitalpur, Baitalpur, Chhattisgarh
- Christian Hospital Diptipur (not currently functioning)
- Christian Hospital, Berhampur, Odisha
- Christian Hospital Mungeli, Mungeli, Chhattisgarh
- Evangelical Hospital, Khariar, Odisha
- Evangelical Hospital, Tilda, Chhattisgarh
- Jackman Hospital, Bilaspur, Chhattisgarh
- St. Luke's Hospital, Hiranpur, Pakur, Jharkhand

Hospitals of Jeypore Evangelical Lutheran Church

- Christian Hospital, Bissamcuttack, Rayagada, Odisha
- Christian Hospital, Nabarangpur, Odisha

Top Christian hospitals in India

- Bangalore Baptist Hospital, Hebbal, Bangalore, Karnataka
- Christian Hospital Mungeli, Mungeli, Chhattisgarh
- Christian Medical College, Ludhiana, Punjab
- Christian Medical College, Vellore, Tamil Nadu
- Mission of Mercy Hospital & Research Centre, Kolkata, West Bengal

Hospitals of CMC

- Bangalore Baptist Hospital, Hebbal, Bangalore, Karnataka
- Christian Medical College, Vellore, Tamil Nadu

Hospitals of The Salvation Army

- The Salvation Army Catherine Booth Hospital, Nagercoil, Tamil Nadu (CBH Putheri Hospital)
- The Salvation Army Emery Hospital, Anand, Gujarat
- The Salvation Army Evangeline Booth Hospital, Ahmednagar, Maharashtra
- The Salvation Army Evangeline Booth Hospital, Ponnur, Andhra Pradesh (The American Hospital)
- The Salvation Army Evangeline Booth Hospital, Puthencruz, Kerala (Varikoli Hospital)
- The Salvation Army Kulathummal Hospital, Kattakada, Kerala
- The Salvation Army MacRobert Hospital, Dhariwal, Punjab
- The Salvation Army Medical Centre, Kangazha, Kerala

Hospitals of CSI

- CSI Campbell Mission Hospital, Jammalamadugu, Kadapa
- CSI Eva Lombard Memorial Hospital, Udupi, Karnataka
- CSI Hospital, Bangalore, Karnataka
- CSI Hospital, Brough Road, Erode, Tamil Nadu
- CSI Hospital, Gadag-Betgeri, Karnataka
- CSI Hospital Marthandam
- CSI Hospital Nagercoil
- CSI Ikkadu Hospital, Ikkadu, Thiruvallur
- CSI Kalyani Hospital, Chennai
- CSI Kanchipuram Hospital, Kanchipuram
- CSI Mission Hospital Neyyoor
- CSI Nagari Hospital, Nagari, Andhra Pradesh
- CSI Rainy Hospital, Chennai
- CSI Thiruvallur Hospital, Thiruvallur
- Kanyakumari Medical Mission
- Mary Lott Lyles Hospital, Madanapalle, Andhra Pradesh

Other Christian hospitals in India

- Baer Christian Hospital, Chirala, Andhra Pradesh
- Bangalore Baptist Hospital, Hebbal, Bangalore, Karnataka
- Central India Christian Mission Hospital, Damoh, Madhya Pradesh
- Christ Anand Hospital, Brahmapuri, Maharashtra
- Francis Newton Mission Hospital, Firozpur, Punjab
- Kugler Hospital, Guntur, Andhra Pradesh
- Mure Memorial Hospital, Nagpur, Maharashtra
- Padhar Hospital, Padhar, Betul, Madhya Pradesh
- Pondicherry Institute of Medical Sciences, Puducherry
- Ruth Sigmon Memorial Lutheran Hospital, Guntur, Andhra Pradesh
- Scudder Memorial Hospital, Ranipet, Tamil Nadu
- St. Joseph Hospital, Guntur, Andhra Pradesh
- St. Joseph's Hospital, Baramulla
- The Madras Medical Mission, Chennai

== Iran ==
- Isa Bin Maryam Hospital
- Shiraz Christian Missionary Hospital
- Yazd Missionary Clinic

== Israel ==
- The Nazareth Hospital
- The French Hospital (Nazareth)
- The Austrian Hospital (Nazareth)

== Kenya ==
- AIC-CURE International Hospital

== Liberia ==
- E.L.W.A. (Eternal Love Winning Africa) Hospital

== Malawi ==
- Beit CURE International Hospital
- Malamulo Mission Hospital
- Mulanje Mission Hospital
- Nkhoma Mission Hospital

== Mali ==
- Outiala Hospital

== Nepal ==
- HDCS-TEAM Hospital Dadeldhura
- Lamjung District Community Hospital
- Palpa Mission Hospital
- Okhaldunga Hospital

== Niger ==
- CURE Hôpital des Enfants au Niger

== Pakistan ==
- Bach Christian Hospital
- Kunri Christian Hospital
- Christian Hospital, Quetta
- Christian Hospital, Sahiwal
- Mission Hospital, Peshawar
- Henry Holland Mission Eye Hospital, Shikarpur
- Holy Family Hospital, Rawalpindi
- Kinhar Christian Hospital, Garhihabibulla, Mansehra
- Mission Hospital, Quetta
- Memorial Christian Hospital, Sialkot
- Shikarpur Christian Hospital
- St. Elizabeth's Hospital, Hyderabad
- St. Teresa's Hospital, Mirpurkhas
- Taxila Christian Hospital
- United Christian Hospital, Lahore
- Women's Christian Hospital, Multan

== Philippines ==
- Iloilo Mission Hospital
- Tebow CURE Hospital

== Thailand ==
- Bangkok Adventist Hospital, commonly referred to as "Mission Hospital."

== Uganda ==
- CURE Children's Hospital of Uganda

== United Arab Emirates ==
- Oasis Hospital

== United States ==
- Mission Hospital (Mission Viejo, California)
- Mission Hospital (Asheville, North Carolina)

== Zambia ==
- Beit CURE Hospital of Zambia
- Minga Mission Hospital
- The Salvation Army Chikankata Mission Hospital
- Mukinge Mission Hospital (Kasempa)

== Zimbabwe ==
- Karanda Mission Hospital
- Mbuma Mission Hospital
- Chidamoyo Christian Hospital
- Makonde Christian Hospital
- Mashoko Christian Hospital
- Morgenster Mission Hospital
- Mtshabezi Mission Hospital
- Bonda Mission Hospital
- Murambinda Mission Hospital
- Mutambara Mission Hospital
- Tshelanyemba Mission Hospital
- Luisa Guidotti Hospital
- Elim Mission Hospital
- Songati Baptist Hospital
- Rusite Mission Hospital
- St Joseph Mission Hospital Mutare
