= Bhoopasandra inscriptions and hero stones =

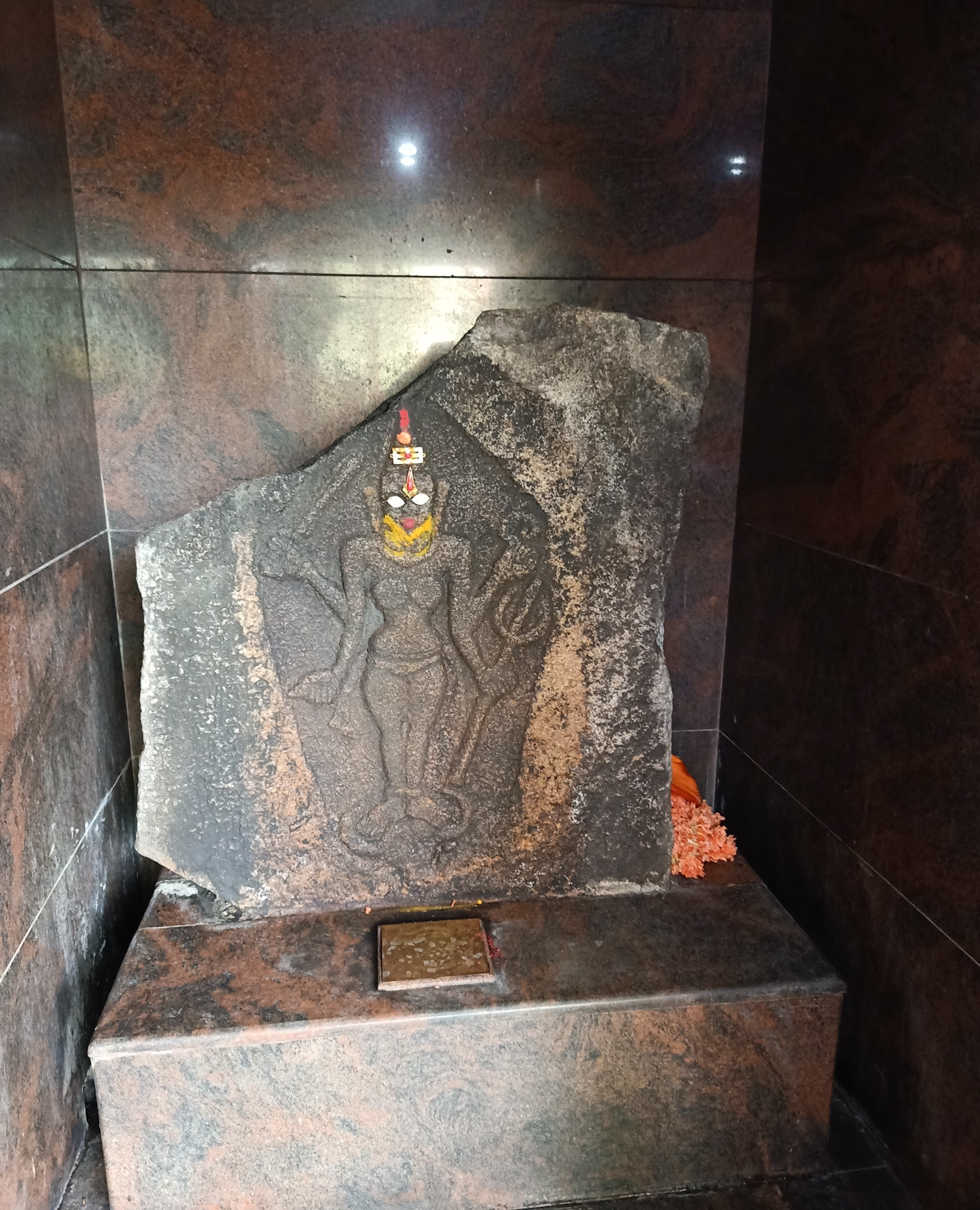
Bhoopasandra 750CE Durga Idol with Inscription.

The Bhoopasandra inscriptions and hero stones are found in Bhoopasandra, a sub-locality in Hebbal, Bengaluru. It is the home to an idol of goddess Durga with a Kannada inscription dated to the 8th century CE, the oldest found in Bengaluru with a documented history of more than a millennium. The Durga sculpture that carries the inscription is partially damaged, with the first lines of the inscription now missing.

From the visible lines, it is evident that the purpose of this inscription was to document a grant made to the Goddess Durga. The initial lines of the inscription mention four individuals— Padiltumbu, Manchageya, Karuveeda, and Nallolamoleya—as witnesses to the grant. This idol is presently housed in a modest temple within the precincts of the Anjaneya Temple in Bhoopasandra. This idol is located near the 750CE Hebbal-Kittaya herostone, the oldest inscription to be found in Bengaluru.

== Dating and discovery ==
Bhoopasandra 750CE Durga Idol With Inscription
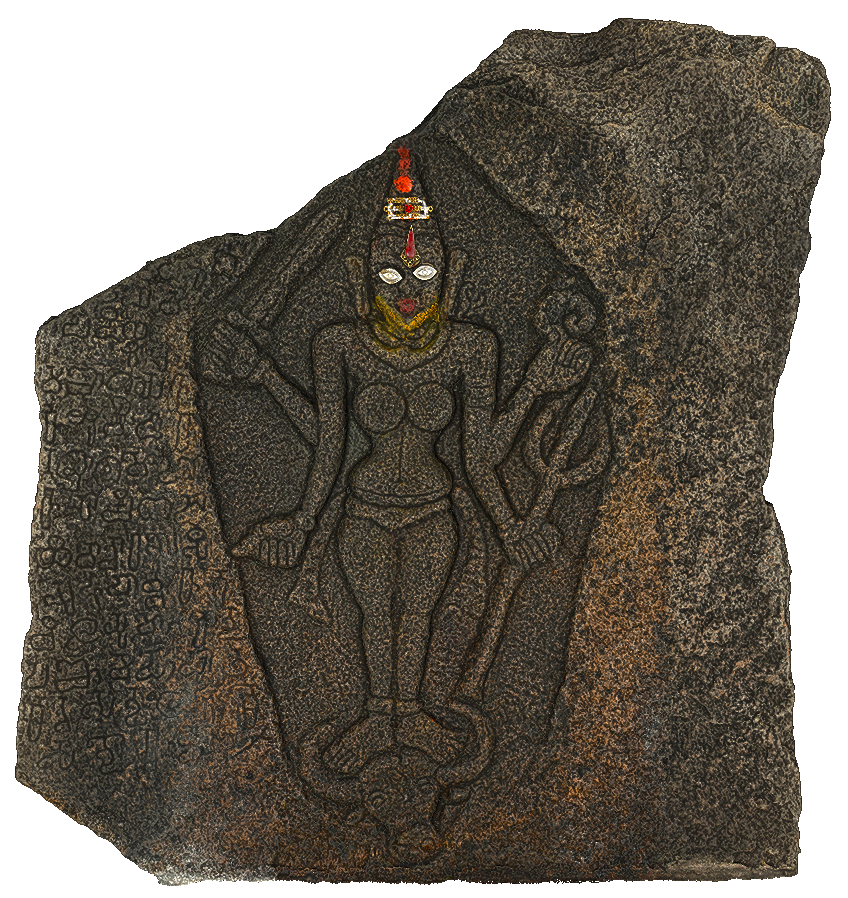
- Digital Image of the Bhoopasandra 750CE Durga Idol With Inscription
- Material: Stone
- Height: 85 cm (33 in)
- Width: 79 cm (31 in)
- Created: 750CE
- Discovered: 2011
- Discovered by: Department of Kannada and Culture and Tumkur University
- Present location: 13.044472°N 77.581056°E
- Language: Kannada
- https://mythicsociety.github.io/AksharaBhandara/#/learn/Shasanagalu?id=102750

According to historian and epigraphist, P V Krishnamurthy, he first saw this idol with an inscription in the 1980s when it was initially placed in a modest temple on the Hebbal lake bund, adjacent to Bellary road. Sometime in the late 1990s, during the construction of the Outer Ring Road, the temple and the idol were disturbed and were pushed into one of the water inlets leading into the lake. The then Hebbal railway station master, Rao, noticed the discarded idol and informed K Venkatesh a trustee at the nearby Anjaneya temple in Bhoopasandra, who relocate the idol there. Subsequently, a dedicated small temple was constructed for this 8th century Durga idol. The inscription was documented by P. V. Krishnamurthy. The inscription is paleographically dated to the 750 CE.

== Physical characteristics ==
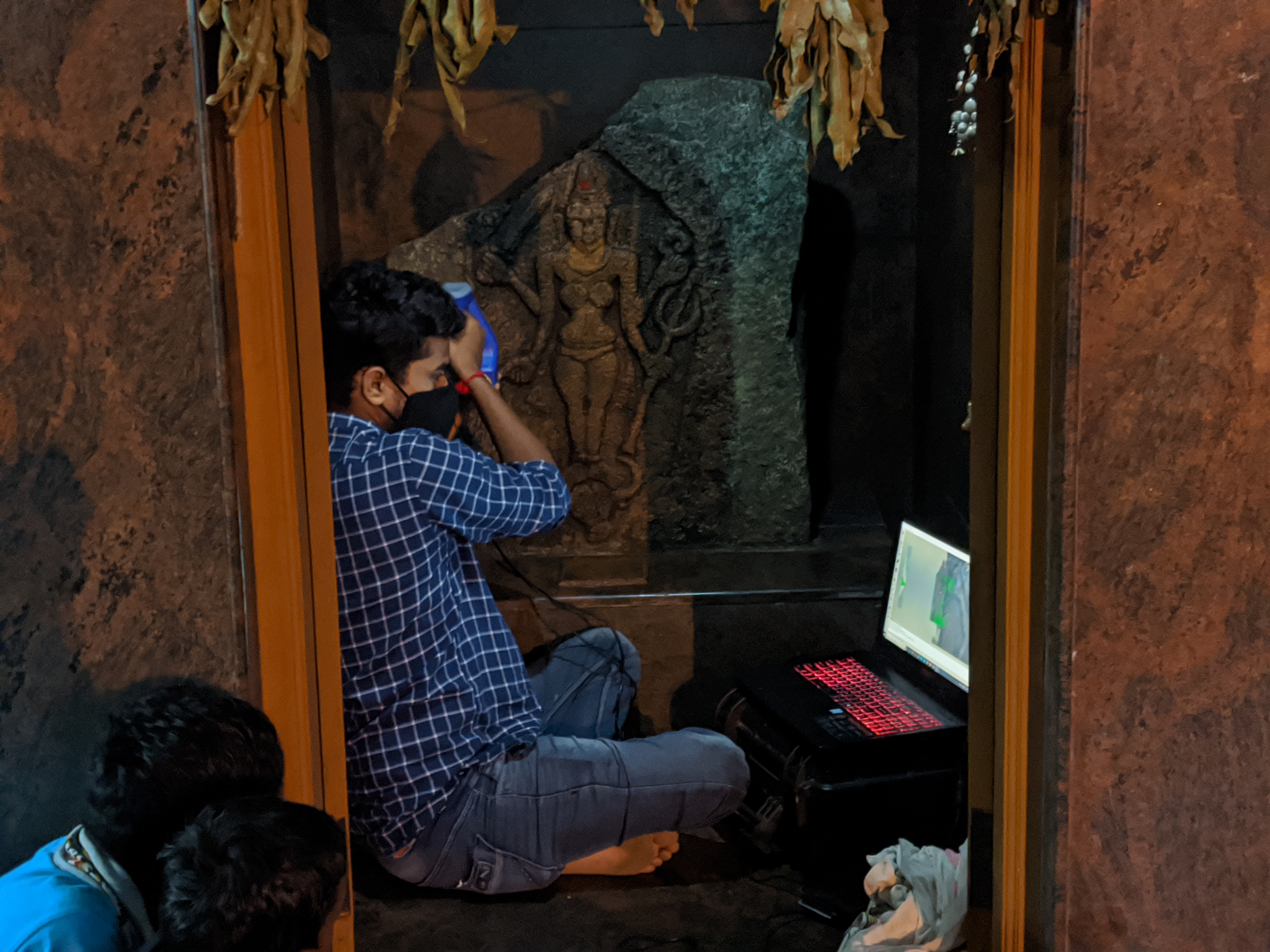
3D Scanning of the Bhoopasandra 750CE Durga Idol with Inscription.

The inscription is 85 cm tall and 79 cm wide. The Kannada Characters are approximately 2.8 cm tall, 2.6 cm wide & 0.25 cm deep (very shallow). The deity is depicted with four arms, standing atop a buffalo head. Her arms hold a sword, a trident, a conch and a bowl. This simplistic portrayal of Goddess Durga is commonly observed in idols dating to the 7th and 8th centuries, found in Telangana, Southern Karnataka and Tamil Nadu.

== Transliteration of the inscription ==
The text below is the rereading published in the Journal of the Mythic Society.

Digital Images of each of the characters of this inscription, images of the inscription itself, summary and the other information about the inscription have been shared via Akshara Bhandara software.

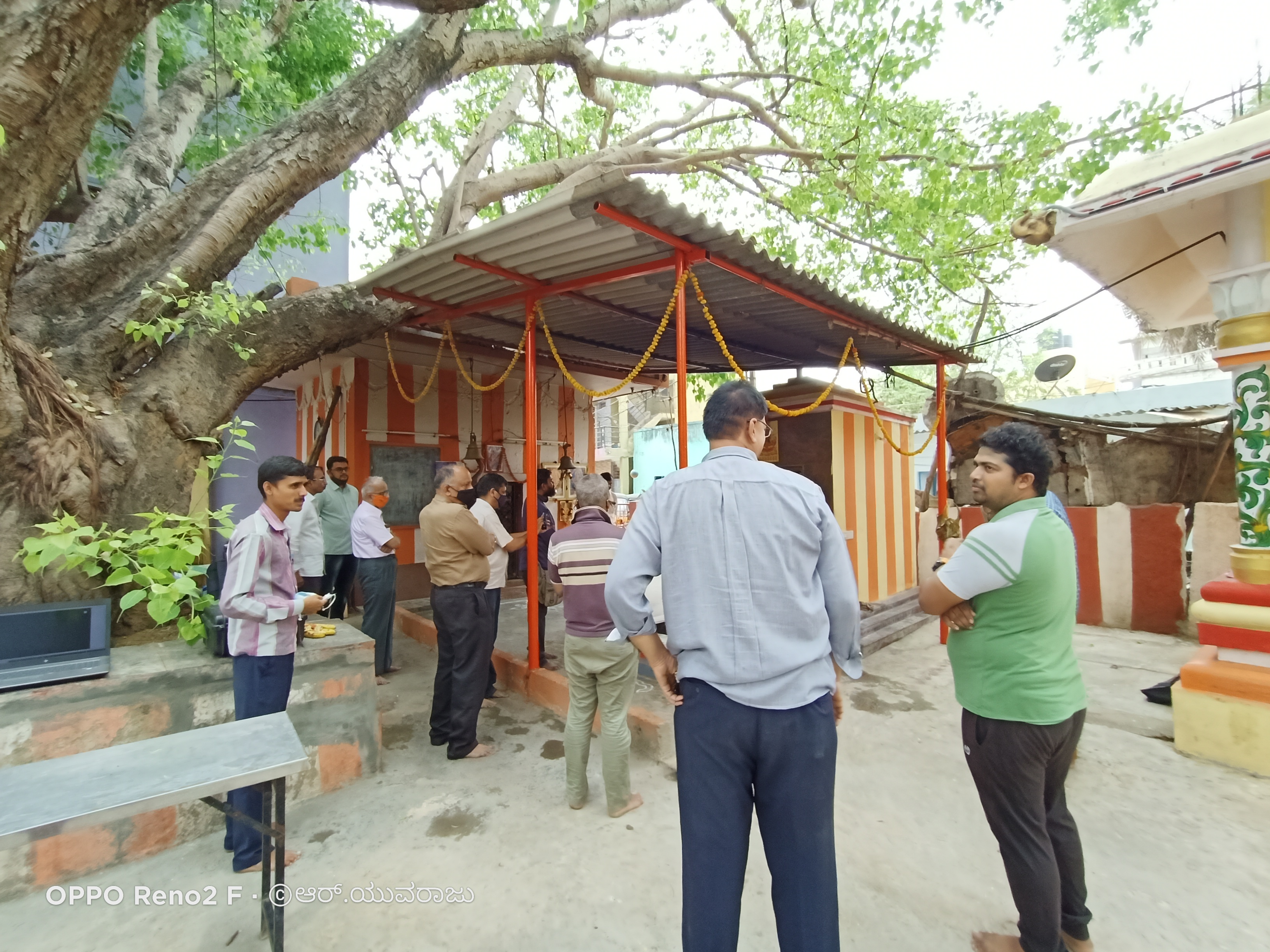
Wide Angle View Photograph of the Bhoopasandra 750CE Durga Idol with Inscription.

Line Number	Kannada	IAST
1	. . . . ಳುಬ	. . . . luba
2	. . . ಯಮ	. . . yama
3	ಪದಿೞ್ತುಮ್ಬು	padiḻtumbu
4	ಮಞ್ಚಗೆಯರು	mañcagĕyaru
5	ಕಱುವೀಡರು	kaṟuvīḍaru
6	ನಲ್ಲೊಲಮೊಳೆಯೊ	nallŏlamŏlĕyŏ
7	ರು ಸಾಕ್ಷಿ ಇದಾ	ru sākṣi idā
8	ನೞಿವೊನ್ವಾರಣಾಸಿ	naḻivŏnvāraṇāsi
9	ಯುಳು ಪಾರ್ವ್ವರು.ಕ	yulu pārvvaru ka
10	ವಿಲೆಯು ಮಾನ್ ಕೊನ್ದ	vilĕyu mān kŏnda
11	ಪಞ್ಚ ಮಹಾಪಾತ	pañca mahāpāta
12	ಕನ ಸನ್ದ ಲೋಕಕ್ಕೆ	kana sanda lokakkĕ
13	ಸನ್ದೊರಪ್ಪಾ .	sandŏrappā

== Shapashaya ==
Shapashaya are imprecatory verses found in many Kannada Inscriptions to sanctify records and protect them from harm. The inscription records one such Shaapashaya serving a cautionary warning, stating that anyone who violates the grant will suffer the same fate as those who kill a Kapile (an orange-brown sacred cow) or a Brahmana in Varanasi or commit the panchamahapatakas, the five great sins. According to the Garuda Purana, the act of killing a cow is believed to result in rebirth of a person into a hunchback at their subsequent birth. Similarly, the Garuda Purana states that the act of killing a Brahmana leads to rebirth as a donkey, camel, or a female buffalo. The panchamahapatakas, as listed in the Manu Smriti, are considered to be the five gravest sins or heinous crimes. These sins include:

- Killing a Brahmana
- Drinking intoxicating liquors
- Stealing gold
- Committing adultery with the wife of a guru
- Associating with anyone guilty of these crimes.

Various commentators of the Manu Smriti provided slightly different variations of the aforementioned five sins.
