= Taxila (disambiguation) =

Taxila or Takshashila is a city in Punjab, Pakistan which is situated near the ancient city of the same name.

Taxila or Takshashila may also refer to:

== Places ==
- Taxila Tehsil, a tehsil (sub-district) of Rawalpindi District, Punjab, Pakistan with its administrative centre in Taxila
  - Taxila Cantonment, a military cantonment adjacent to Taxila
    - Taxila Cantonment Junction railway station
- Taxila Museum, a museum in Taxila dedicated to objects from ancient Taxila
- Taxila Christian Hospital, an eye hospital in Taxila
- University of ancient Taxila, a centre of learning in ancient Taxila
- Takshashila Complex, education complex in Surat, Gujarat, India; site of a 2019 fire disaster

== Other uses ==
- Taxila copper plate, 1st-century BC Indo-Scythian inscription from Taxila
- Taxila (butterfly), a butterfly genus
- Thakshashila, a 1995 Indian film
- Taxiles, king of Taxila during the Indian campaign of Alexander the Great
