= Henry Holland Mission Eye Hospital =

Hospital in Shikarpur, Sindh

Geography
- Location: Shikarpur, Sindh, Pakistan
- Coordinates: 27°57′11″N 68°38′58″E

Organisation
- Care system: Public

History
- Former name: Hiranand Charitable Eye Hospital
- Opened: 1909

Links
- Lists: Hospitals in Pakistan

Sir Henry Holland Mission Eye Hospital (Urdu: ہنری ہالینڈ مشن آئی ہسپتال), also known as Sir Henry Eye Clinic, Mission Eye Hospital, and Hiranand Charitable Eye Hospital, is an eye hospital located in Shikarpur, Sindh. It is named after Sir Henry Holland.

== History ==
The inception of Sir Henry Holland Mission Eye Hospital can be traced back to 1909 when a philanthropist, Hiranand, invited Sir Henry Holland to establish a medical facility in Shikarpur. Hiranand provided land, construction resources, and a sustenance fund for the patient and their companions. Holland accepted, on the condition that the local community leaders consented to the project, and he retained the freedom to practice his faith and preach outside his professional environment.

The proposal was initially met with substantial opposition due to Holland's affiliation with a Christian mission, raising religious concerns among the Hindu and Muslim communities. Hiranand, however, challenged the objectors to find a doctor with the same caliber and commitment as Holland who was not Christian. Hiranand eventually succeeded, leading to the establishment of an annual eye clinic in Shikarpur, starting from 1910.

Throughout the 1920s and 1930s Holland's pioneering contributions in ophthalmology drew international attention. Physicians and surgeons from the United Kingdom, Europe, and as far as the United States, Canada, and Australia came to learn and practice at the hospital. This influx of global expertise transformed the hospital into a leading eye care facility.

Hiranand, until his untimely death in 1913, bequeathed an endowment of Rs100,000 (approximating Rs105 million in 21st century) to sustain the clinic and cover staff expenses.

After formally retiring in 1948, Holland transferred the administrative reins of the mission hospitals in Quetta and Shikarpur to his son, Harry Henry. Nevertheless, he continued to perform eye surgeries at Shikarpur until 1956, reflecting his unflagging dedication to the cause of ocular health.

Since its foundation more than 150,000 eye operations have been performed.
