= Garlaniyan =

Village in Khyber Pakhtunkhwa, Pakistan

Garlaniyan گڑلانیاں
- Location within Khyber Pakhtunkhwa Location within Pakistan
- Coordinates: 34°9′21″N 73°13′10″E
- Country: Pakistan
- Province: Khyber Pakhtunkhwa
- District: Abbottabad
- Tehsil: Abbottabad
- Union council: Banda Pir Khan
- Founded: 1857

Area
  - Total: 1.23 km^{2} (0.47 sq mi)
- Elevation: 1,500 m (4,900 ft)

Population (2012)
  - Total: 480
- Time zone: UTC+5 (PST)

Garlaniyan is a village in the Abbottabad District, Khyber Pakhtunkhwa province in Pakistan. Abbottabad is the capital of Hazara Division. The village was founded in 1857. Garlaniyan is part of the union council Banda Pir Khan. Garlaniyan is about 26.5 kilometers (15.8 mi) away from Abbottabad. The nearest town from Garlaniyan is Qalandarabad, which is 12 kilometers (7.5 mi) away.

Garlaniyan has only one government-owned primary school, poor roads, and no gas pipeline provided by the government. Ayub Teaching Hospital is the nearest government hospital.
