= Hebbal-Kittayya inscription =

Inscription stone in Bangalore, India

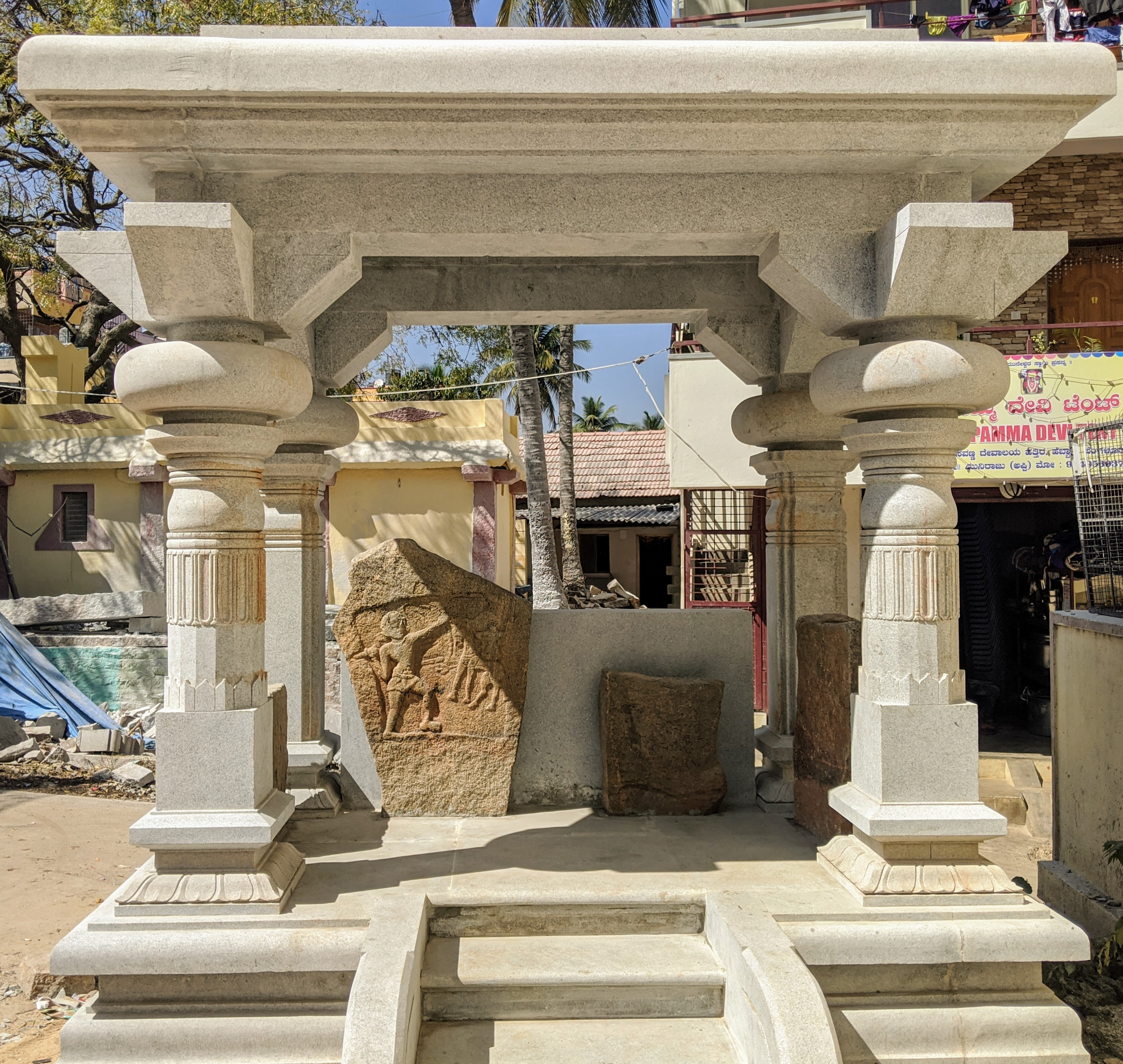
The Ganga Architectural Style Mantapa which houses Bengaluru's oldest Inscription Stone.

Hebbal is a locality situated in the northern part of Bengaluru, is recognized as one of Bengaluru’s oldest regions, with documented history extending back at least 1,300 years. Originally marking the northern boundary of the city, Bengaluru has since expanded significantly northward. The area is renowned for Hebbal Lake which is thought to have contributed to early settlement in the area. Additionally, Hebbal is home to 3 valuable historical inscriptions that contribute to Bengaluru's rich epigraphic heritage. Two of these inscriptions are being preserved physically and digitally, while the status of the third inscription is unknown.

== Etymology ==
The etymology of "Hebbal" is believed to originate from the Halegannada terms piriya (meaning "big") and polal (meaning "town"). Over several centuries, the name underwent various phonetic transformations:

piriya + polal = per-bolal > pervvolal >perbbolal >perbbol > pebbol > pebbāla > hebbāla

ಪಿರಿಯ + ಪೊೞಲ್ = ಪೆರ‍್ಬೊೞಲ್ > ಪೆರ್ವ್ವೊೞಲ್ > ಪೆರ್ಬ್ಬೊೞಲ್ > ಪೆರ್ಬ್ಬೊಳ್ > ಪೆಬ್ಬೊಳ್ > ಪೆಬ್ಬಾಳ > ಹೆಬ್ಬಾಳ

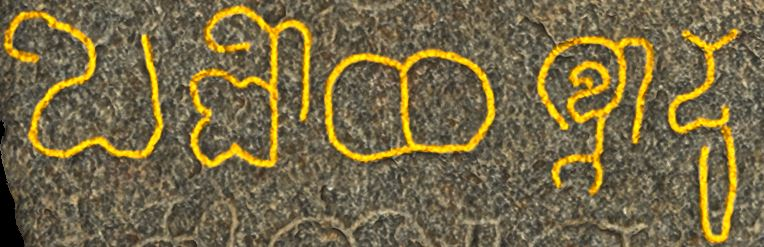
Digital Image of a place name Pĕrbŏḻalnāḍu obtained by 3D scanning of the Hebbal 750CE Kittayya's Uralivu Herostone With Inscription.

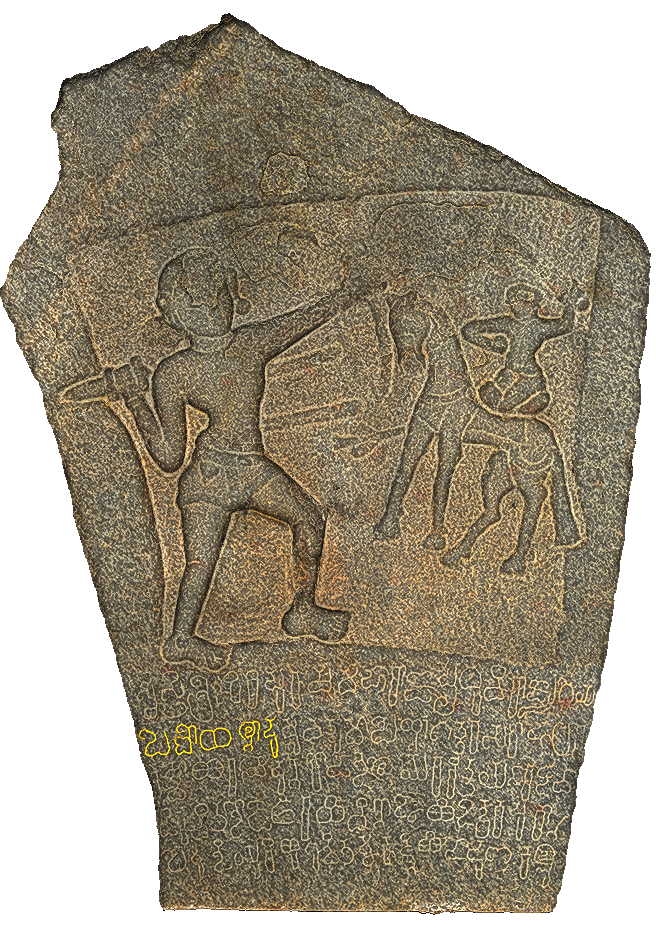
Digital Image Highlighting the Place Name 'Pĕrbŏḻalnāḍu' in the Hebbal 750CE Kittayya's Uralivu Herostone With Inscription.

Between the 9th and 11th centuries, a series of phonetic changes occurred in the Kannada language. Words beginning with "pa" frequently shifted to "ha" (for example, puli became huli, and paalu became haalu), and terms containing "va" were often replaced by "ba" sounds, as seen in the evolution of perbolal to Hebbal.

== Historic significance ==
Hebbal was a pivotal administrative center, overseeing 30 nearby towns and villages. A significant inscription dated to 750 CE on a hero stone commemorates Kittayya, a resident of Perbolanadu (modern-day Hebbal), who bravely defended the region against a Rashtrakuta invasion. This inscription establishes him as the earliest known inhabitant of Bengaluru, often referred to as the city’s "first citizen." Additionally, the inscription references Pelnaagattharasa, a chieftain who governed Hebbal during the reign of Ganga King Sripurusha (r. 726–788 CE). Sripurusha's extensive kingdom encompassed present-day Kolar, Bangalore, Krishnagiri, Salem, Erode, Mandya, Mysore, Coorg, Chikamagalur, Shimoga, and Tumkur districts.

A 10th-century Hulibete Veeragallu (hero stone depicting a tiger hunt) discovered within the Indian Institute of Science (IISc) campus further underscores the region’s association with valor and the historical presence of tigers in the area.

Another significant artifact from Hebbal is a 750 CE Durga idol, bearing a fragmented Kannada inscription, now preserved in the Anjaneya Temple in Bhoopasandra. This inscription records a land grant to the goddess Durga, suggesting the presence of an ancient shrine or temple dedicated to her in the region. The inscription lists four witnesses to the grant, reflecting a structured societal framework in Hebbal. Scholars propose a potential link between this Durga idol and the Hebbal-Kittayya hero stone, suggesting that Kittayya himself may have venerated this deity.

In addition to its administrative function, Hebbal was vital as a water reservoir and agricultural center. Along with Koramangala, Challaghatta, and the Vrishabhavathi Valley, Hebbal served as a major water source for Bengaluru. Research conducted in the 1890s estimated the Hebbal Tank to have a water-holding capacity of approximately 27 million cubic feet. The surrounding area was also a prominent agricultural hub and a crucial trade route connecting Bengaluru to Hampi and other regions, enhancing its significance within the broader network of the Ganga kingdom.

== Preservation of the Inscription Stones ==
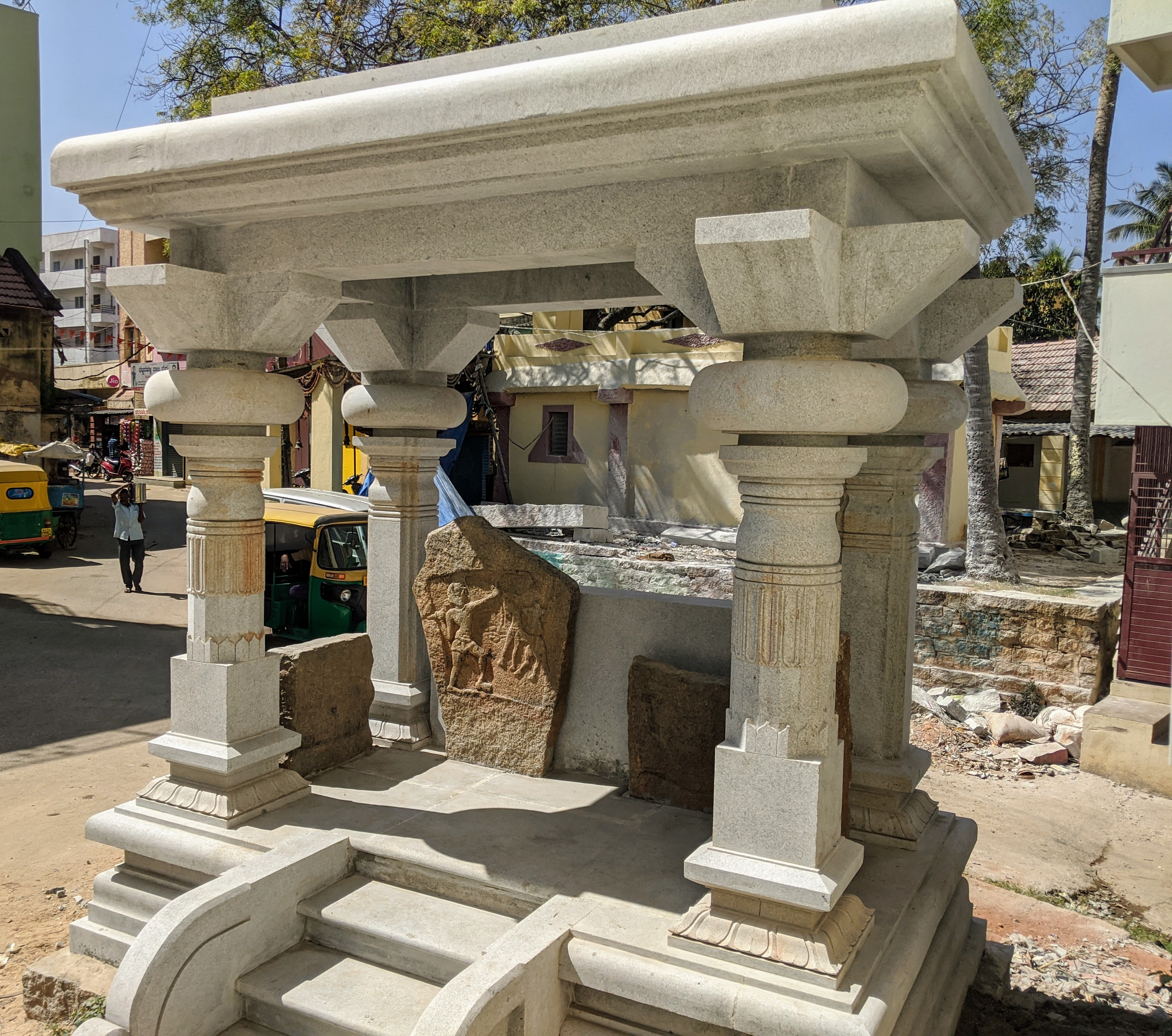
The Ganga Architectural Style Mantapa which houses Bengaluru's oldest Inscription Stone.

The inscriptions were discovered in a precarious state, neglected in a roadside ditch. They were vulnerable to damage from ongoing road development projects. Fortunately, Dilip Kshatriya, a concerned local resident, recognized their historical significance and alerted both the authorities and the Revival Heritage Hub (RHH), a dedicated heritage conservation organization.

With RHH's assistance, the inscription was rescued and relocated to a safer location, averting imminent destruction. However, this was only the first step toward ensuring its long-term preservation.

To ensure long-term preservation, a group of committed citizens, led by P. L. Udaya Kumar, a former tech professional and current Honorary Director of the Mythic Society Bengaluru Inscriptions 3D Digital Conservation Project team, initiated a crowdfunding campaign to construct a mantapa.

The campaign was widely supported, drawing contributions from individuals and organizations both domestically and internationally. This support highlighted the inscription's importance and the collective will to protect Bengaluru's historical heritage.

The funds raised enabled the construction of a mantapa designed in the Ganga architectural style, reflecting the period to which the inscription belongs. The mantapa not only protects the hero stone but also serves as a visual reminder of the city's rich and often overlooked history.

The Hebbal-Kittayya inscription, now housed within its dedicated mantapa, stands as a testament to the power of community-driven preservation. It exemplifies how citizens, working together, can safeguard their heritage for future generations.

The inscriptions were subsequently 3D scanned by The Mythic Society Bengaluru Inscriptions 3D Digital Conservation Team, ensuring their preservation for future generations. This digital documentation allows for detailed study and analysis, making the inscriptions accessible to researchers and enthusiasts worldwide.

== Hebbal 750CE Kittayya's Uralivu Herostone With Inscription ==
Hebbal 750CE Kittayya's Uralivu Herostone With Inscription
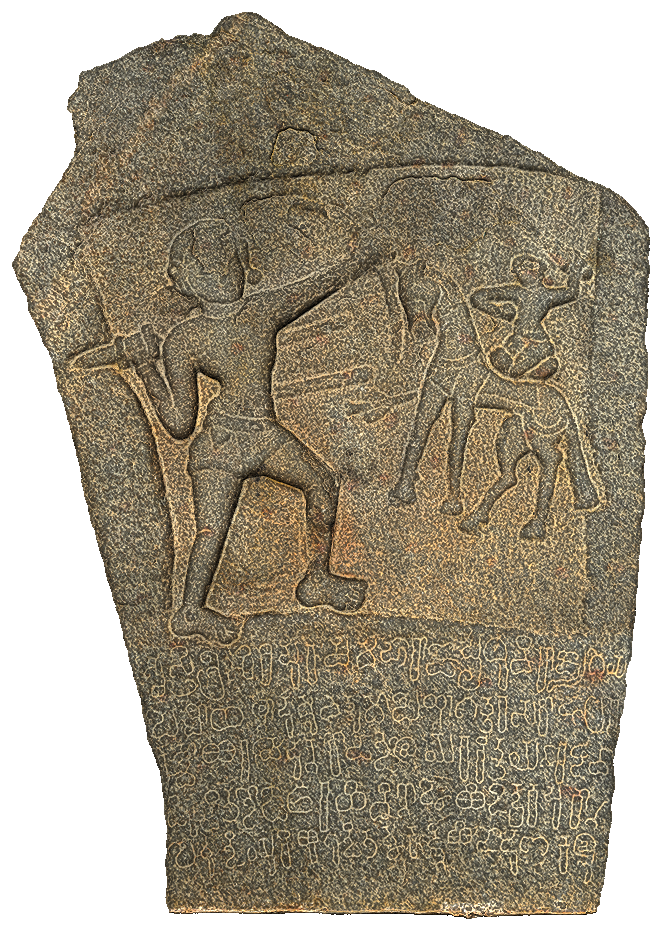
- Digital Image of the Hebbal 750CE Kittayya's Uralivu Herostone With Inscription
- Material: Stone
- Height: 115 cm (45 in)
- Width: 84 cm (33 in)
- Writing: Kannada
- Created: 750CE
- Discovered: Hebbal
- Discovered by: P V Krishnamurthy in Itihasa Darpana Vol 37-38
- Present location: 13.040444°N 77.591250°E

=== Characteristics of the Inscription ===
The inscription was first documented by P.V. Krishnamurthy in Itihasa Darpana (Vol. 37-38, 2018) and later by Srinivas V. Padigar in the Quarterly Journal of the Mythic Society (Vol. 113, Issue No. 2, Apr-Jun 2022). It is carved on a granite slab measuring 115 cm in height and 84 cm in width. The characters are approximately 3 cm tall, 4 cm wide, and 0.24 cm deep. The stone's surface is moderately dressed, prepared specifically for inscription.

The inscription depicts a dynamic battle scene. A figure, standing proudly, holds a bow in one hand and a knife in the other. Despite being struck by spears or arrows, he faces an opponent on horseback. Interestingly, the mounted warrior is depicted in an unusual kneeling position on the horse’s back, rather than the traditional seated posture. The carving of the standing figure is notably elegant and well-proportioned, while the horse and rider appear somewhat distorted and disproportionate.

This hero stone sheds light on the concept of Uralivu, illustrating how Kittayya bravely fought and sacrificed his life in defense of his town.

=== Discovery and dating ===
Until May 2018, lying in a roadside ditch close to Hebbal village gate were four ancient puja stones. These were in danger of being buried in any road development project. Dilip Kshatriya, a resident of Hebbal contacted Revival Heritage Hub (RHH), a Bengaluru based organization working in the area of heritage conservation and with their support, the four "puja" stones were shifted to an adjacent BBMP office. Of these four stones, one of which a veeragallu when dug revealed a hitherto unknown and undocumented inscription on the portion that was buried under the earth. This veeragallu inscription was subsequently deciphered by Dr. P.V. Krishnamurthy an eminent Kannada epigraphist and dated to 750 CE.

When discovered parts of the veeragallu had flaked and the inscription somewhat weathered. A 3D digital scan assisted in reading the inscription completely. On Palaeographic considerations, the date of the inscription is assigned to 750CE. In the absence of an explicit date mentioned in an inscription, it is a traditional practice to assign a date to the closest 10, 50, or 100th year on palaeographical considerations.

=== Transliteration of the text in modern English ===
The text of the inscription in Purvada halegannada language and written in Ganga period Kannada script was deciphered by eminent epigraphist Dr. P.V. Krishnamurthy. The exact transliteration of the inscription in IAST is as follows (line numbers are not part of the original inscription, including them is a default practice with inscriptions).

1. svasti śrī siripuruṣa mahārājā prathuvī rājyaṃgeyye
2. perbboḷalnāḍu mūvattumānpeḻnāgattarasarāḷe āra
3. kammoṟara maiṃdunaṃ koḍandaleyara kittayanā raṭṭavā
4. ḍi kūci tandoḍe ūraḻivinūḷeṟidindraka pukān
5. pergundiyu kiṟugundi tamma kurḷniṟidodu i kalluṃ

=== Transliteration of the text in modern Kannada ===
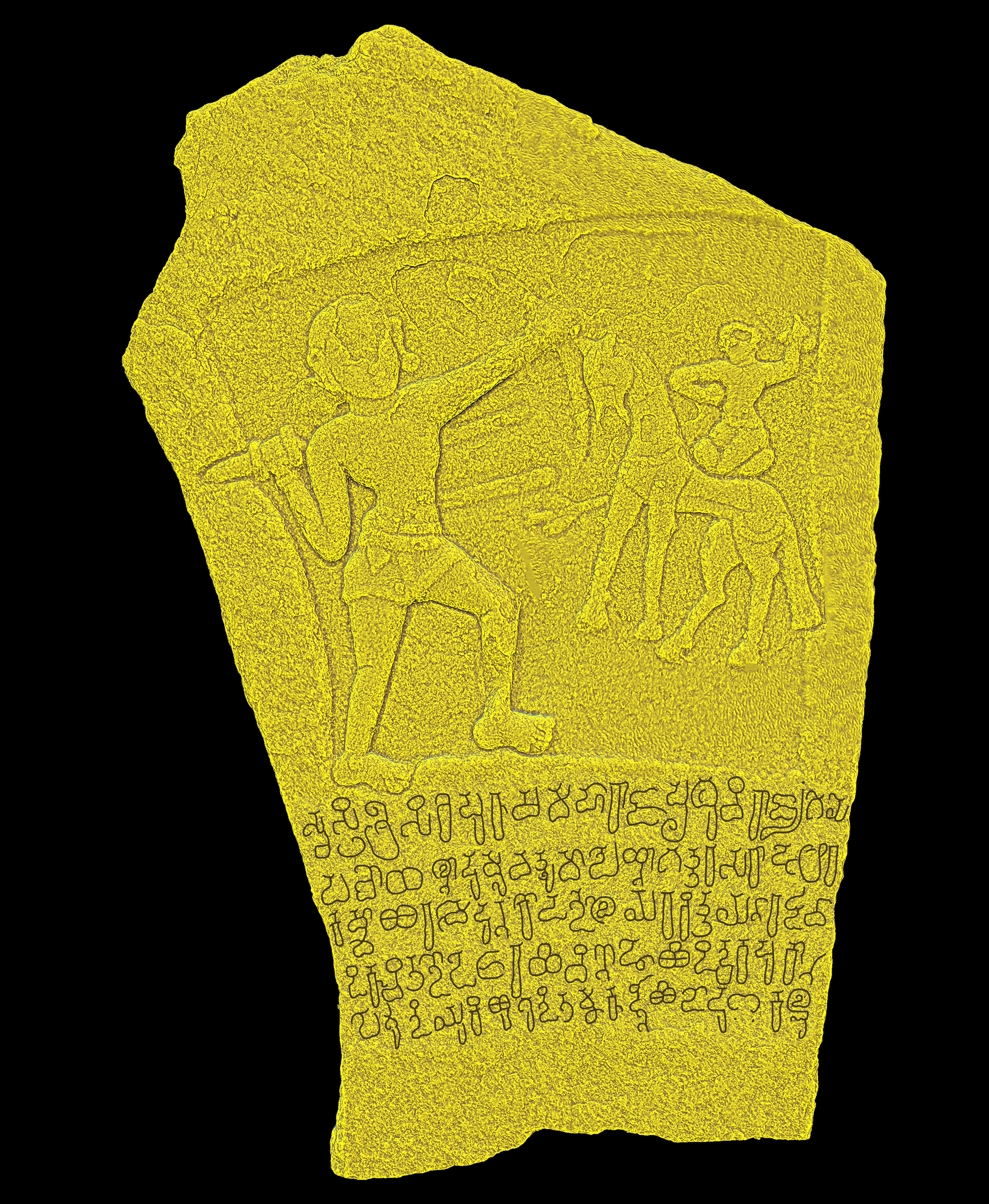
Digitally generated image of the inscription from a 3D scan of the 750CE Hebbal-Kittayya veeragallu

The full reading of the inscription as published by Dr. P.V. Krishnamurthy in Itihaasa Darpana Vol 36-38, 2018.

1. ಸ್ವಸ್ತಿ ಶ್ರೀ ಸಿರಿಪುರುಷ ಮಹಾರಾಜಾ ಪ್ರಥುವೀ ರಾಜ್ಯಂಗೆಯ್ಯೆ
2. ಪೆರ್ಬ್ಬೊಳಲ್ನಾಡು ಮೂವತ್ತುಮಾನ್ಪೆೞ್ನಾಗತ್ತರಸರಾಳೆ ಆರ
3. ಕಮ್ಮೊಱರ ಮೈಂದುನಂ ಕೊಡನ್ದಲೆಯರ ಕಿತ್ತಯನಾ ರಟ್ಟವಾ
4. ಡಿ ಕೂಚಿ ತನ್ದೊಡೆ ಊರೞಿವಿನೂಳೆಱಿದಿನ್ದ್ರಕ ಪುಕಾನ್
5. ಪೆರ್ಗುನ್ದಿಯು ಕಿಱುಗುನ್ದಿ ತಮ್ಮ ಕುರ್ಳ್ನಿಱಿದೊದು ಇ ಕಲ್ಲುಂ

=== Explanation of the inscription ===
A literal translation of the inscription is:

"When SriPurusha Maharaja was ruling the Earth, Pelnagattarasa was administering Perbbolalnaadu-30, Kittayya the brother-in-law of Arakommora of Kodandale clan attained Indra Loka in an uuralivu battle during a Rattavadi attack. This stone was installed by Pergundi and his brother Kirugundi". The inscription carved on a veeragallu that commemorates Kittayya, a resident of Perbbolnaadu-30 who was martyred while defending an attack by the Rattavadis (i.e., Rashtrakutas). The attack intended to raze to the ground (uru-alivu) the town Perbbol. At this time, Pelnagattarasa was the chieftain of Perbbolalbnaadu and SriPurusha the King. The suffix 30 Perbbolnaadu indicates that it was provincial head for an administrative unit of 30 nearby towns and villages in the Ganga kingdom.

Ganga King Sripurusha was a powerful king of the Ganga dynasty who ruled between 726 - 788 CE. The Western Ganga dynasty were a powerful Southern Indian dynasty from 400-1000CE. Sripurusha’s kingdom referred to as Gangavadi 96000 extended to the regions of modern-day Kolar, Bangalore, Krishnagiri, Salem, Erode, Mandya, Mysore, Coorg, Chikamagalur, Shimoga and Tumkur districts. Numerous veeragallu found from this period in these regions are testimonies to the fierce battles and skirmishes between the Gangas and the Rashtrakutas during this period.

=== Importance of the inscription ===
1. The Hebbal-Kittayya inscription is the oldest intact Kannada inscription in the city of Bengaluru. For comparison, it predates the earliest available literary work in Kannada, Kavirajamarga by about 100 years and provides an idea of the form and shape of characters that would have been used in this famous literary work by its author.
2. Being the oldest inscription in Bengaluru, Kittayya named in the inscription is the first documented resident of modern-day Bengaluru. This is the reason why he is fondly referred to as Bengaluru's first citizen by many historians.

== See also ==
- Indian inscriptions
- Kannada inscriptions
- Early Indian epigraphy
- History of Bangalore
- Western Ganga dynasty
- Hindu temple architecture
