= Bach Christian Hospital =

Geography
- Location: Qalandarabad, Pakistan
- Coordinates: 34°15′50″N 73°14′10″E

Organisation
- Care system: Public
- Religious affiliation: Evangelical Alliance Mission

History
- Construction started: 1956

Links
- Lists: Hospitals in Pakistan

The Bach Christian Hospital (BCH) (Urdu: باخ کرسچن ہسپتال) is a hospital situated in Qalandarabad, Pakistan, approximately six kilometers from Abbottabad. It is a 60-bed hospital that provides healthcare services to the underserved population of northern Hazara Division in Khyber Pakhtunkhwa.

== History ==
The hospital was founded in 1956 by the Evangelical Alliance Mission, an Illinois-based organization. It was named in honor of founding missionary Thomas Bach.

Following the 2005 earthquake, the hospital's physical therapy department expanded its services to include prosthetics.

In April 2023, Khyber Medical University (KMU) and Bach Christian Hospital (BCH) formalized a mutual collaboration through a Memorandum of Understanding (MoU). The agreement facilitates reciprocal use of academic and research resources, with KMU focusing on knowledge dissemination and research, and BCH providing practical training across various disciplines.

== Facilities ==
BCH currently runs eleven operational departments, including obstetric and pediatric wards, and two surgical theatres.

The hospital specializes in general surgical services and complicated obstetrics, supported by a laboratory, radiology, ultrasound and physiotherapy facilities, and a pharmacy. It provides critical care for patients suffering from prevalent regional illnesses such as diabetes, tuberculosis, typhoid, and skin burns.
