= Banda Pir Khan =

- Union Council
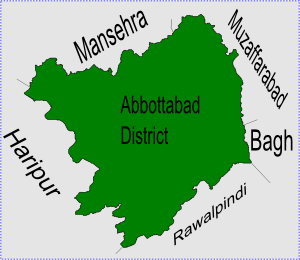
- Banda Pir Khan is located in north of Abbottabad District
- Country: Pakistan
- Province: Khyber-Pakhtunkhwa
- District: Abbottabad
- Tehsil: Abbottabad

Government
  - Nazim (present): Waseem Khan Jadoon; Riaz Khan Jadoon

Population
  - Total: 75,385 (main village and surrounding hamlets)

Banda Pir Khan is one of the 51 union councils of Abbottabad District in Khyber-Pakhtunkhwa, Pakistan.

It is located in the north of the district (to the north west of Abbottabad city) near the border with Mansehra District. The population of Banda Pir Khan and its surrounding hamlets is approximately 75,385.

Banda Pirkhan named After Khan Pir khan Jadoon son of Khan Qasim khan Jadoon. Jhagirdars of Abbottabad Jadoon (Hassa Zai clan) Pathan Tribe Of Pakistan from Banda Peerkhan having Documented History from 1700AD onwards # 1853 MAP . Mangal was the gateway to Kashmir via turnuwai Peer khan's Ancestors and Khan Sahib Peer Khan Jadun family Jhagirdar's of Banda Peerkhan holds this pass almost 150 years before partition during Sikh and British rules. That's why they were known as the High Landers "Guardians of the Northern Passes " Hari sing Nalwa, Teja Sing, Mehtab sing and James Abbott also mentioned it in different books. After partition Pirkhan's jhagir is named as Village Banda Pirkhan located in north of Abbottabad and is largest Union Council of Abbottabad having 5 Village councils. Khan Pir khan is only Jadoon Jhagirdar of Abbottabad holding largest Jhagir in district Abbottabad continued from Sikh Rule.

"Chief's and Mullicks" by James Abbott, 1850. This book is placed at London in the British Library established in 1849, in which a well-wisher from England shared snapshots of Khan sahib Peer khan jadun jhagirdar of jadoons via digital literature.The Hazara deputy commissioner J. ABBOTT honored him with golden words.

"Khan Sahib Shahdad Khan Son of khan sahib khudadad Khan Grandson Of "Khan Sahib Pirkhan khan"Jadoon Jhagirdar of District Abbottabad from Banda Pirkhan.

Honorary magistrate (1885-1900) holding Abbottabad District Darbar. Died in 1901 while Offering Hajj. Buried in Saudi Arabia.

"Khan Sahib Sumandar khan Jadoon grandson of khan Pirkhan Jadoon. Pioneer Member Of NWFP's 1st Legislative assembly formed in 1932.

This is also an Honor for Banda Pirkhan and Abbottabad that khan Summander khan of Banda Pirkhan was the 1st elected member from Abbottabad Hazara.

Khan Wali Muhammad Khan grandson of Pirkhan was also Elected as MLA in 1951 general election of NWFP.

References :

1. Chief's and Mullicks by James Abbott. 1850

2 Hazara Gazetteer. 1864-1878

3.Tarekhe Hazara. 1949

4.Chiefs and Families of Note.. 1890

5.A Collection of Treaties and Engagements of India. 1876

== Subdivisions ==
The Union Council is subdivided into the following areas: Band Pir Khan (main), Kalidhar, Mandrochh, Samesar, Bandi Dhundan, Tarnawai, Lon Patyan and Garlaniyan. Qalandarabad is the main town and junction of the union council, while Banda Pir Khan is the major village in the union council.
