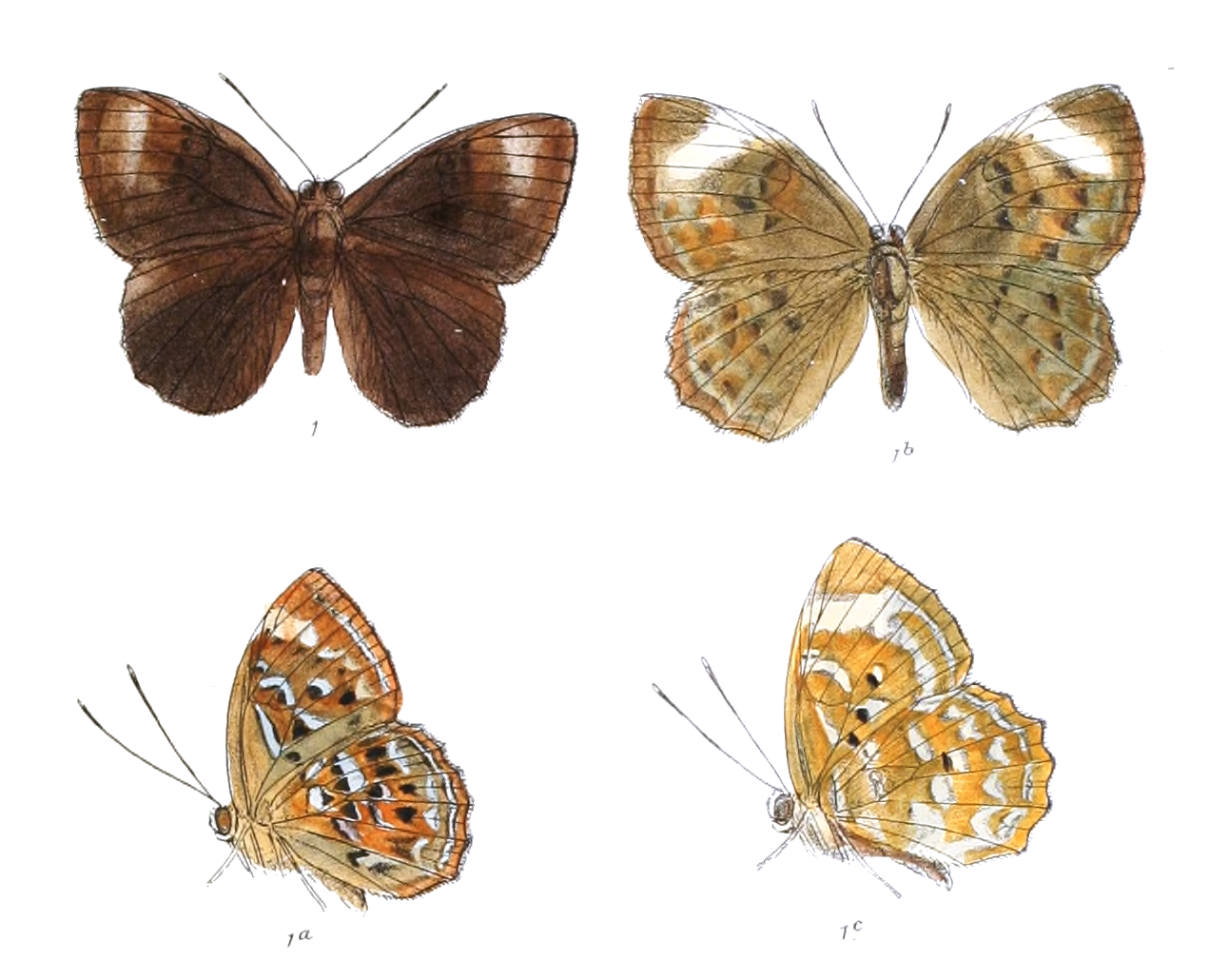

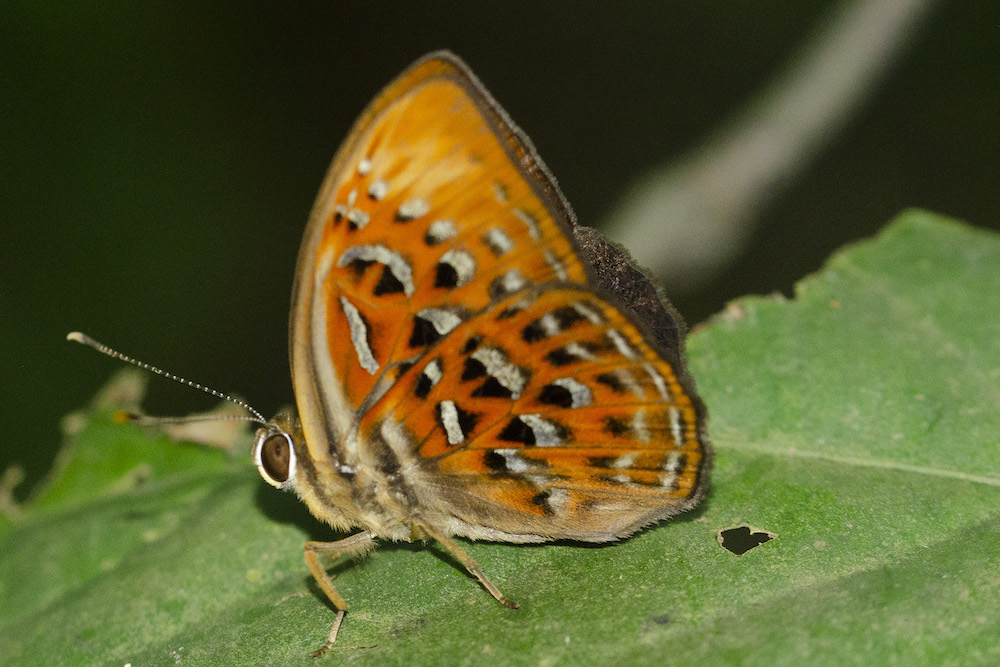

Scientific classification
- Kingdom: Animalia
- Phylum: Arthropoda
- Class: Insecta
- Order: Lepidoptera
- Family: Riodinidae
- Genus: Taxila
- Species: T. haquinus

Binomial name
- Taxila haquinus (Guerin, 1843)

= Taxila haquinus =

Species of butterfly

Taxila haquinus, the harlequin or orange harlequin, is a butterfly from the family Riodinidae. It is found from India east to Palawan and south to Java.

The male is blackish or velvety-brown above, occasionally in continental races with a white or bluish-violet subapical area, the apex with a red-brown tinge even in all the insular branches, female ground colour shading off from dull greyish-brown to a beautiful intense red-brown, either with a white or more rarely reddish-yellow oblique band of the forewings. Upper surface of the females with two rows of partially blurred, square, grey or black spots. Beneath always lighter brown than in the male the transcellular band of the forewings more pronounced than above. Under surface of the males dark, of the females lighter red-brown, but analogous in the markings in as much as both pair of wings are decorated with three rows of steel-glossy, greyish-violet, proximally black-covered violet maculae.

== See also ==
- List of butterflies of India (Riodinidae)

== Other sources ==
- Evans, W.H. (1932). The Identification of Indian Butterflies (2nd ed.). Mumbai, India: Bombay Natural History Society.
- Gaonkar, Harish (1996). Butterflies of the Western Ghats, India (including Sri Lanka) - A Biodiversity Assessment of a Threatened Mountain System. Bangalore, India: Centre for Ecological Sciences.
- Gay, Thomas; Kehimkar, Isaac David; Punetha, Jagdish Chandra (1992). Common Butterflies of India. Nature Guides. Bombay, India: World Wide Fund for Nature-India by Oxford University Press. ISBN 978-0195631647.
- Haribal, Meena (1992). The Butterflies of Sikkim Himalaya and Their Natural History. Gangtok, Sikkim, India: Sikkim Nature Conservation Foundation.
- Kunte, Krushnamegh (2000). Butterflies of Peninsular India. India, A Lifescape. Hyderabad, India: Universities Press. ISBN 978-8173713545.
- Wynter-Blyth, Mark Alexander (1957). Butterflies of the Indian Region. Bombay, India: Bombay Natural History Society. ISBN 978-8170192329.
