= Bangalore Baptist Hospital =

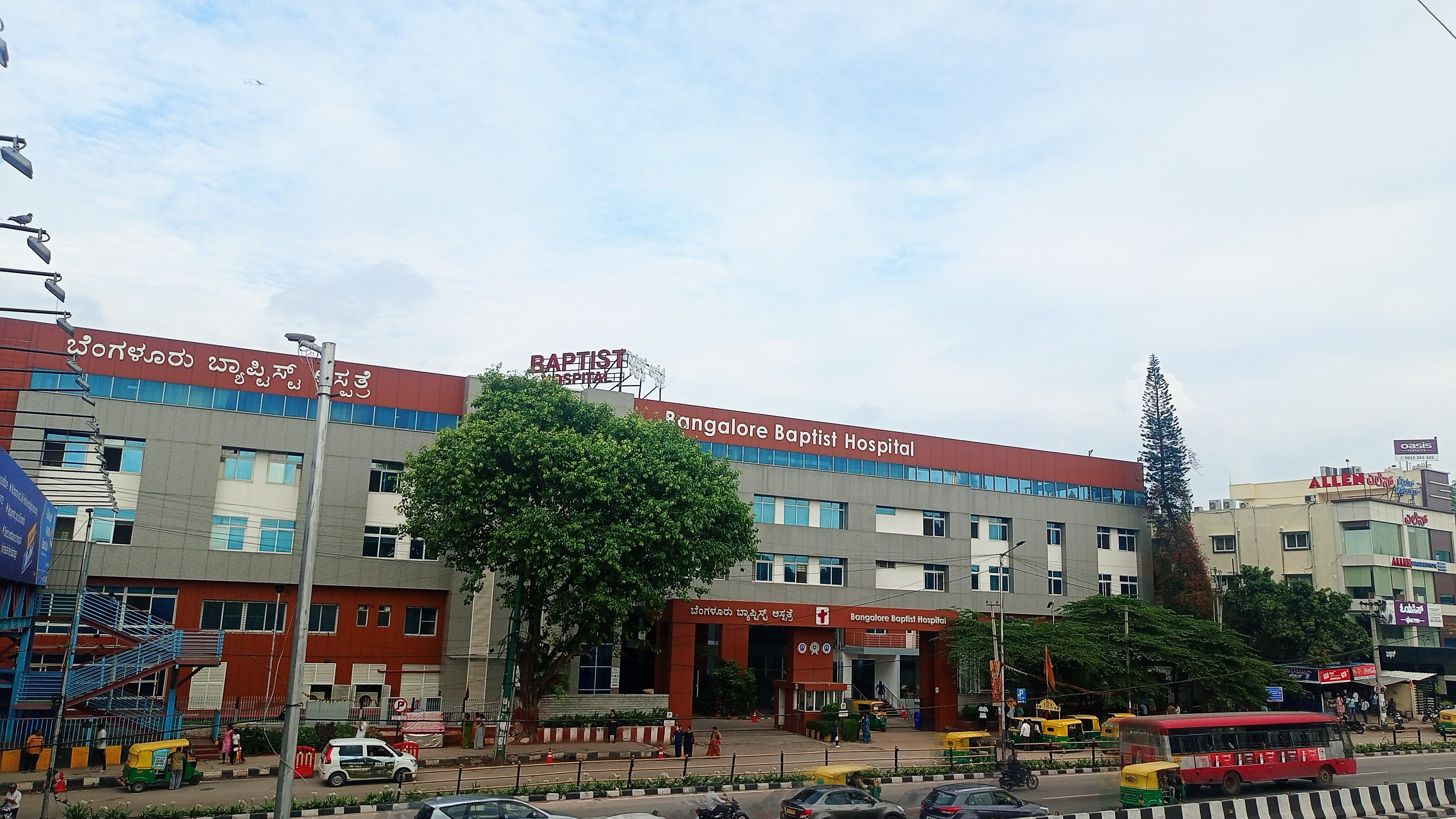

Geography
- Location: Bangalore, Karnataka, India
- Coordinates: 13.03826553195893°N 77.58927009155445°E

Organisation
- Type: General

History
- Opened: 1973

Links
- Website: www.bbh.org.in
- Lists: Hospitals in India

Bangalore Baptist Hospital is a private 450 beds Baptist hospital based in Hebbal, Bangalore, Karnataka, India. It is governed by Christian Medical College (CMC), Vellore.

== History ==
It started as an outpatient clinic in the mid-sixties by the International Mission Board and evolved to a 80-bed general hospital which was formally opened on 15 January 1973. In January 1989, the Christian Medical College became responsible for the administration of the hospital. It conducts various undergraduate and post-graduate nursing, medical and allied health services educational programs.

In 2014, it has received a Quality Award by the Quality Council of India.

In 2022, it opened a 'Women and Children's Health Research Centre'.

In 2024, it had 450 beds.
