= Hebbal Lake, Bengaluru =

Lake in Bangalore, India

Hebbal lake
- Hebbala Kéré (Kannada)
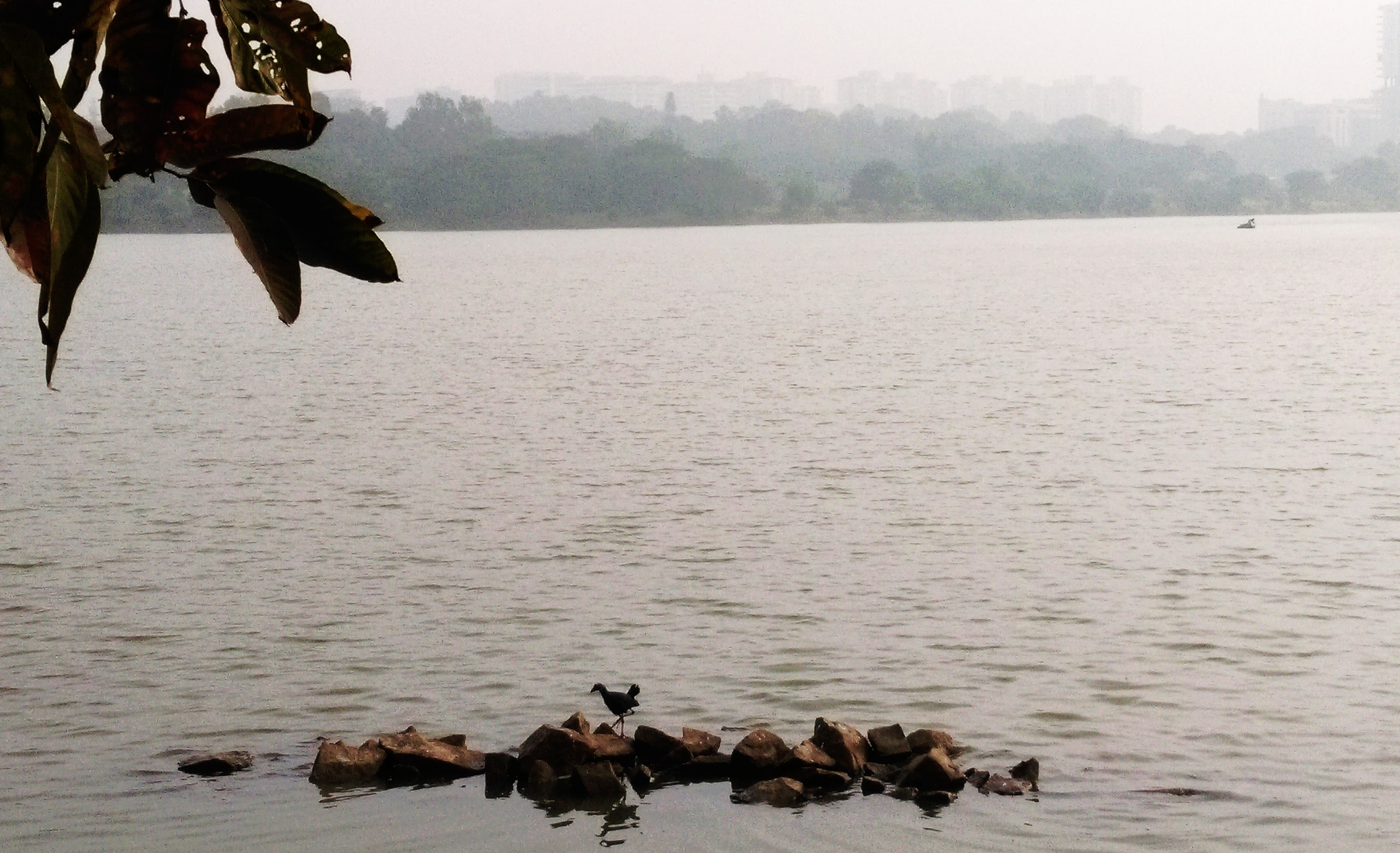

- Location within India Location within Karnataka Location within Bengaluru
- Location: Hebbal, Bangalore Urban, Karnataka
- Coordinates: 13°02′48″N 77°35′13″E
- Type: Stalewater
- Primary inflows: Rainfall and city drainage
- Primary outflows: Nala
- Catchment area: 37.5 km^{2} (14.47883 mi^{2})
- Basin countries: India
- Built: 1537
- Surface area: 57 ha (140.9 acres)
- Water volume: 15,200,000 m^{3} (540,000,000 cu ft) (normal level)
- Islands: 2
- Settlements: Bangalore

Hebbal Lake is located in the north of Bangalore at the mouth of National Highway 7, along the junction of Bellary Road and the Outer Ring Road (ORR). Epigraphic evidence suggests that the lake is much older than commonly assumed. The presence of the Bhoopasandra inscription, dated to the 8th century CE and found near the lake, indicates human settlement and religious activity in the area around 1,300 years ago. Further insights into the region's antiquity come from the work of historian and epigraphist Dr. P. V. Krishnamurthy. In his study of the Bhoopasandra inscription, he documents a grant made to a Durga idol, originally located near the Hebbal lake bund. The inscription references individuals associated with agrarian professions and water management, suggesting the existence of organized settlements and water bodies in the area over 1,200 years ago. This evidence indicates that Hebbal Lake, or its precursor, may have been integral to the region's socio-economic fabric during that period.

Like most lakes or "tanks" in the Bangalore region it was formed by the damming natural valley systems by the construction of bunds. The spread of the lake in a study in 2000 was found to be 75 ha with plans for extending it to make up 143 ha.

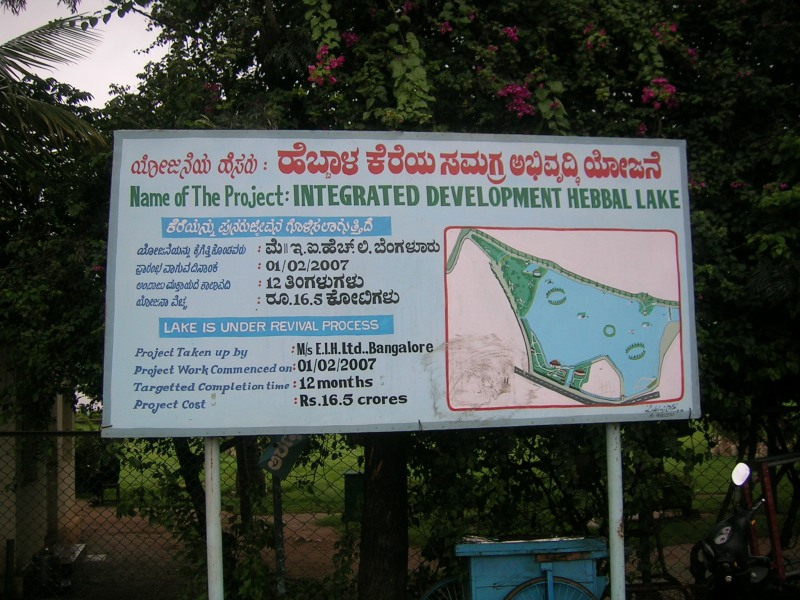
Board at entrance of lake in 2008

== Limnology ==
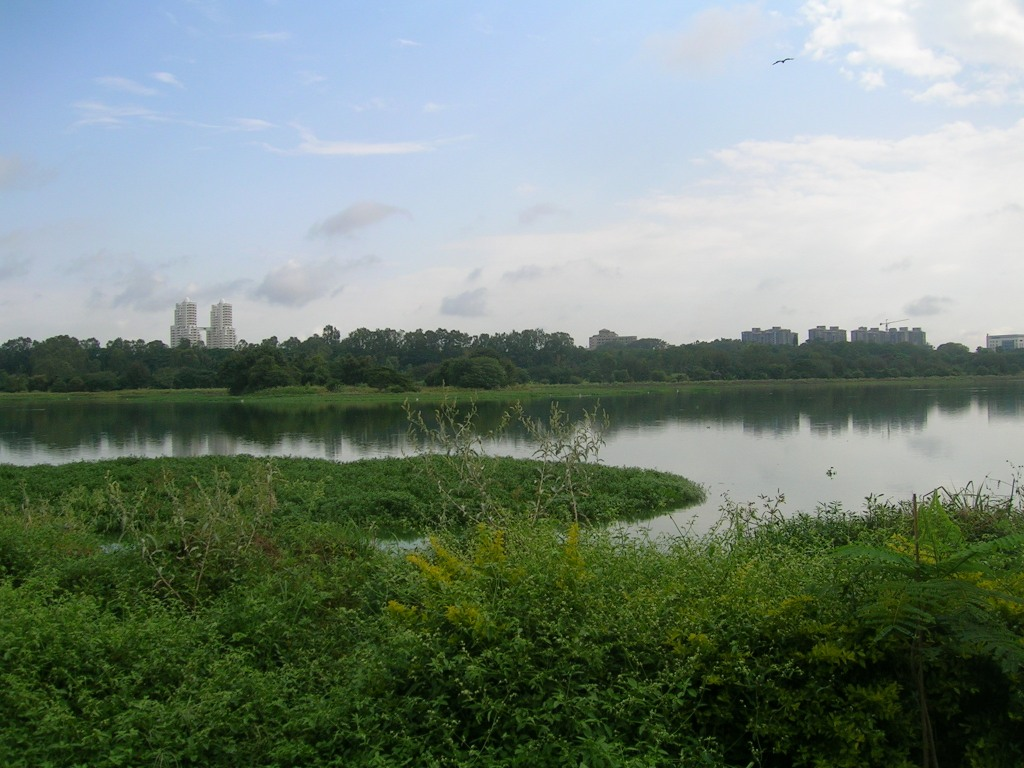
View of the lake in 2008

The catchment area of the lake was found to be 3750ha and this area includes the residential areas of Yeshwanthpur, Mathikere, Rajmahal Vilas Extension, Bharat Electronics Limited and Hindustan Machine Tools Limited colonies. In 1974 the lake area was 77.95 ha and in 1998 it was 57.75 ha. Based on the rainfall of the region, the annual catchment was estimated at 15.2 million cubic metres with 3.04 million cubic metres during the Northeast Monsoon, 10.12 million cubic metres during the Southwest Monsoon and 3.28 million cubic metres in the dry season. The storage capacity of the lake was estimated in 2000 to be 2.38 million cubic metres with desilting raising it to 4.07 million cubic metres. Sewage inflow into the lake has altered the chemistry and biology of the lake. Most measured physico-chemical properties of the waters of the lake exceed the acceptable standards for sewage effluent discharge set by the Indian Standards Institute (Indian Standards: 2490, 1982).

== Ecology ==
The lake is predominantly eutrophic due to the inflow of sewage. The nutrients support the profuse growth of water hyacinth and Typha in the shallow zone. The habitat is favoured by many species of water birds including large waterbirds such as the spot-billed pelican, Eurasian spoonbill, shoveller, pintail, garganey, little grebe, coot and Indian spot-billed duck. The shallow zone supports sandpipers and other waders as well as purple moorhens, little egrets, cattle egrets, purple herons and grey herons.

In the late 1990s, an ecological experiment was conducted with the introduction of Neochetina bruchi and Neochetina eichhorniae weevils from Argentina to control the growth of water hyacinth.

Biodiversity around the lake:

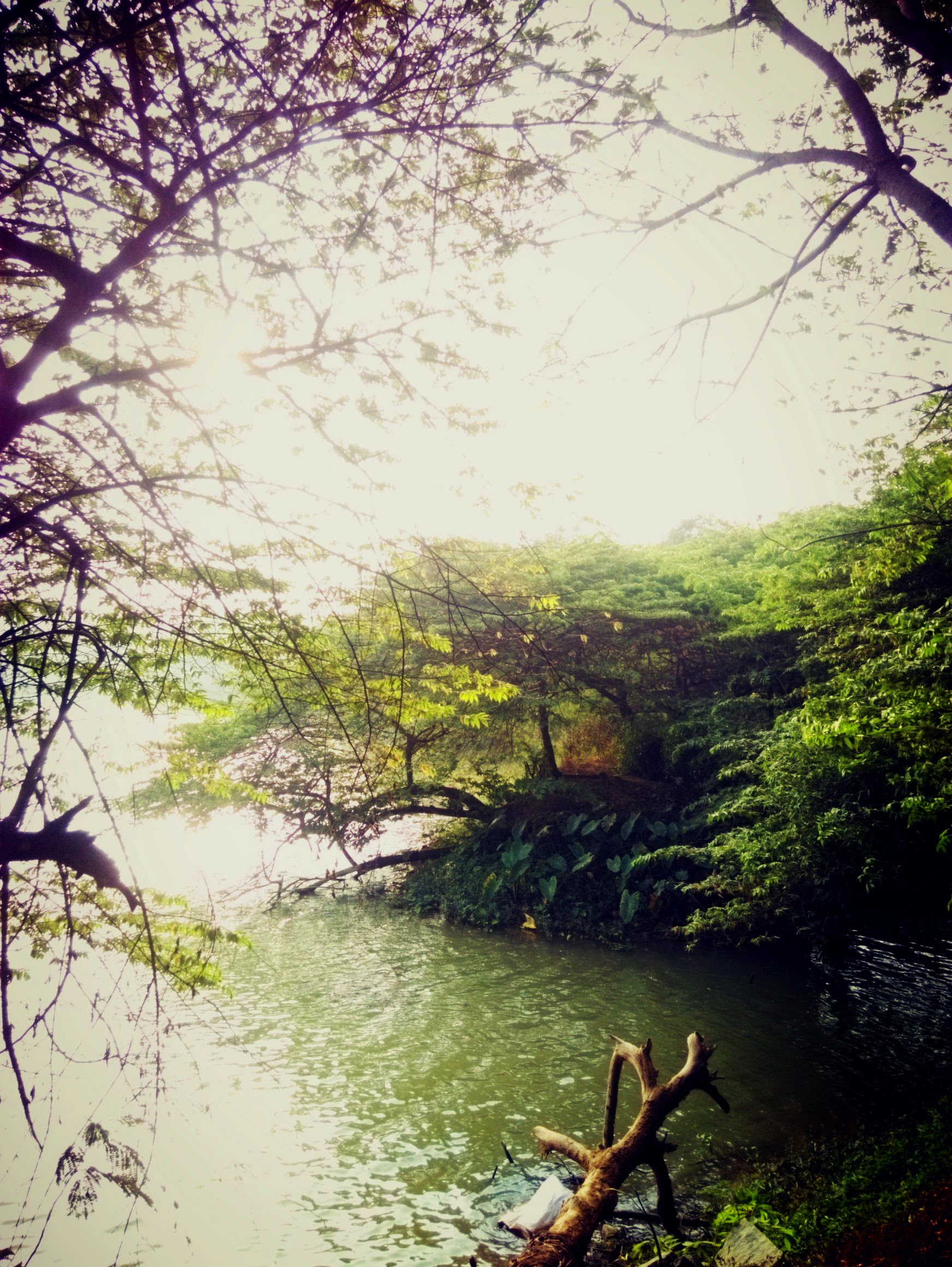

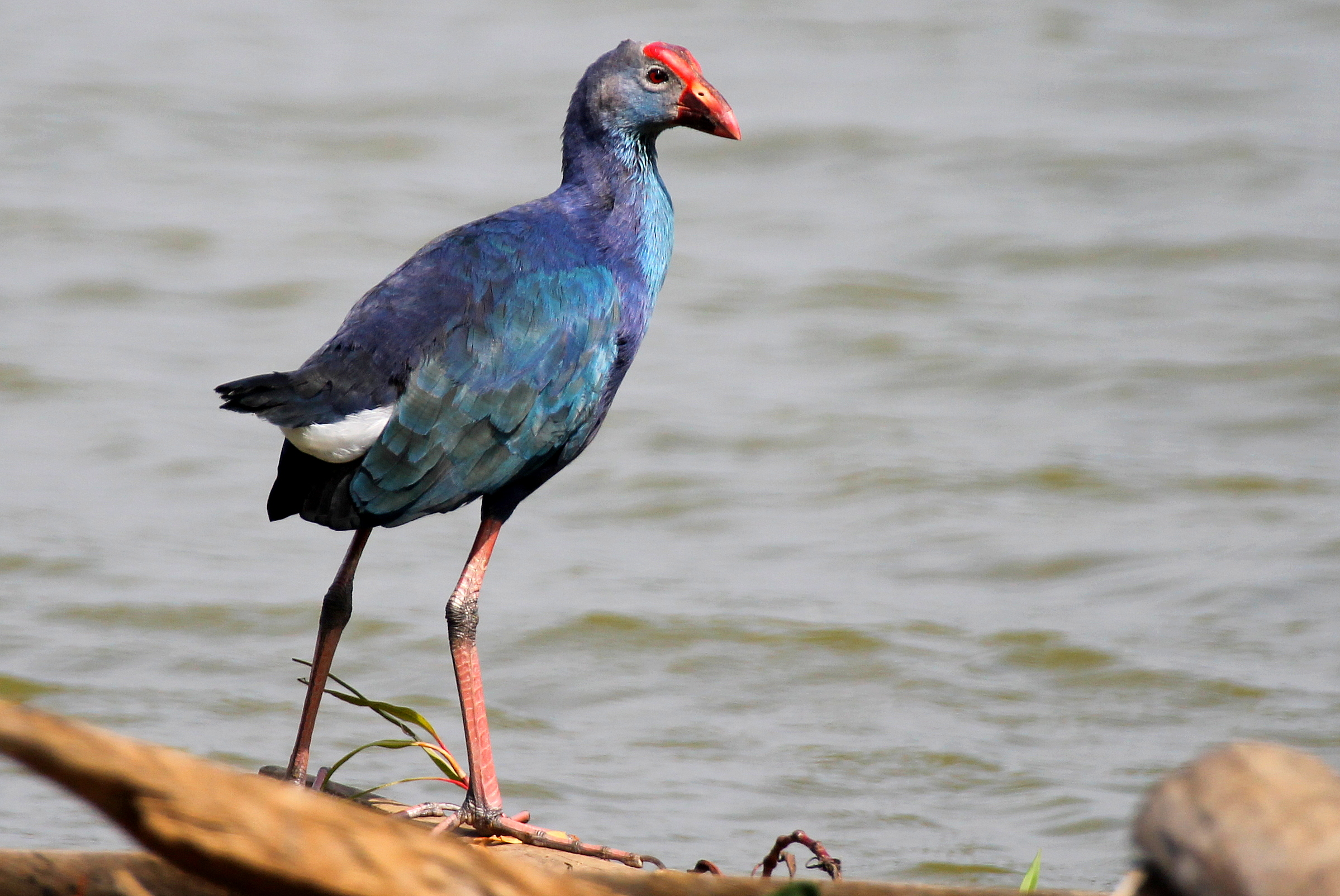

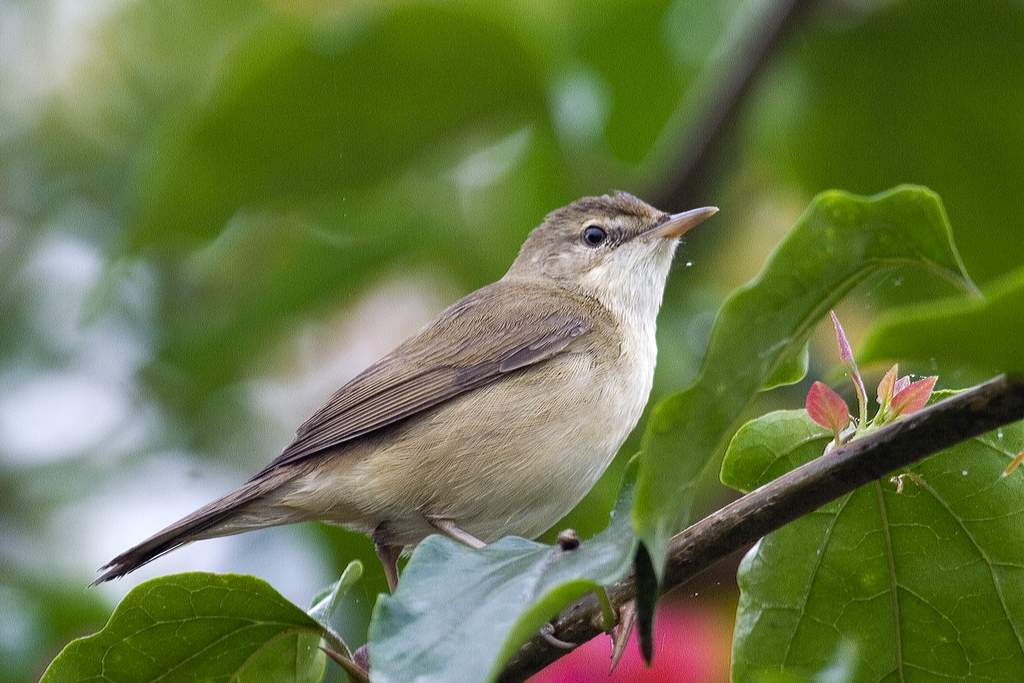

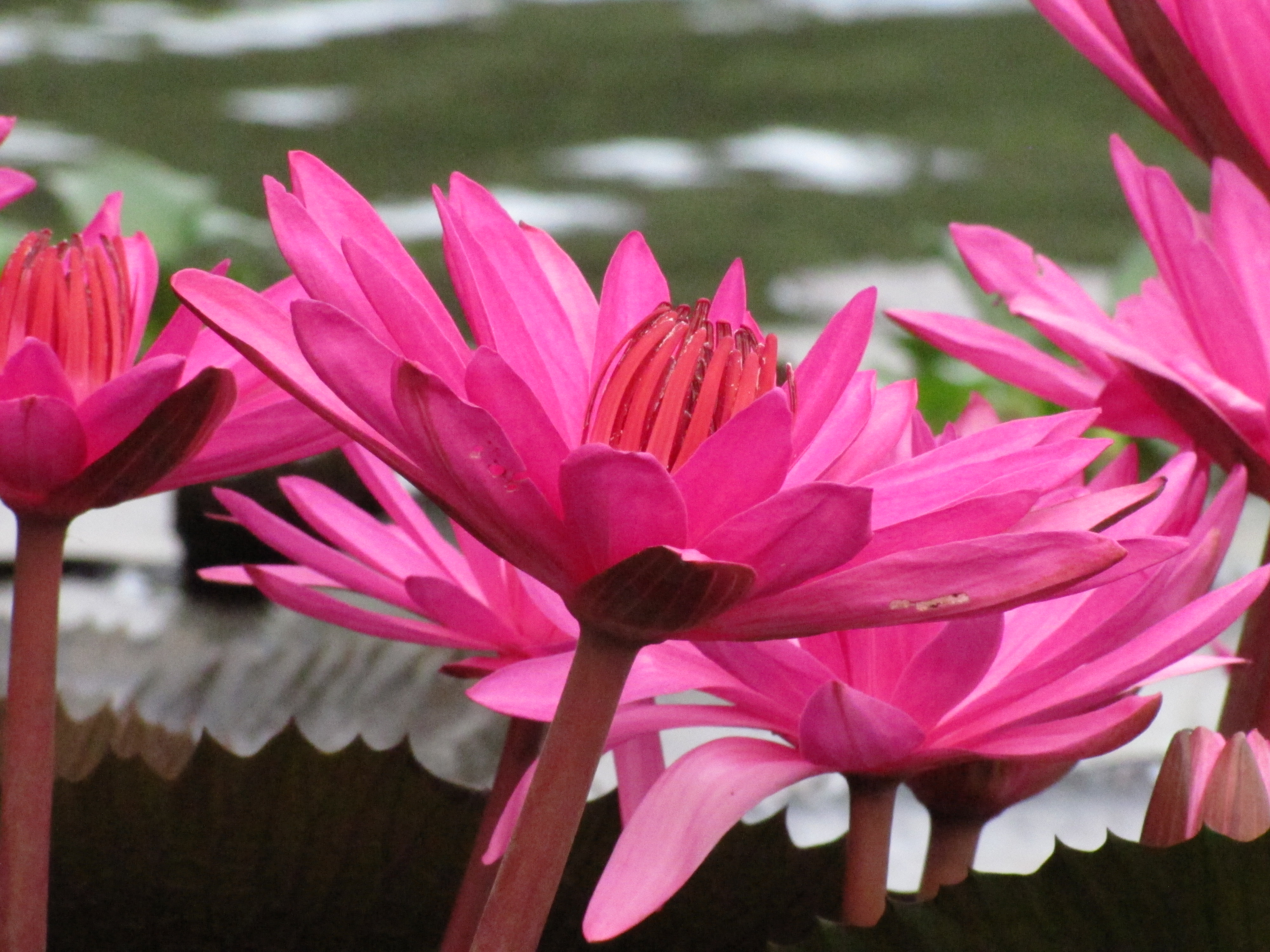

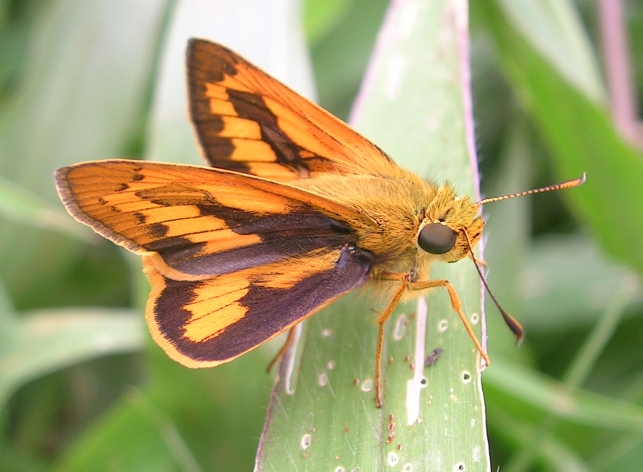

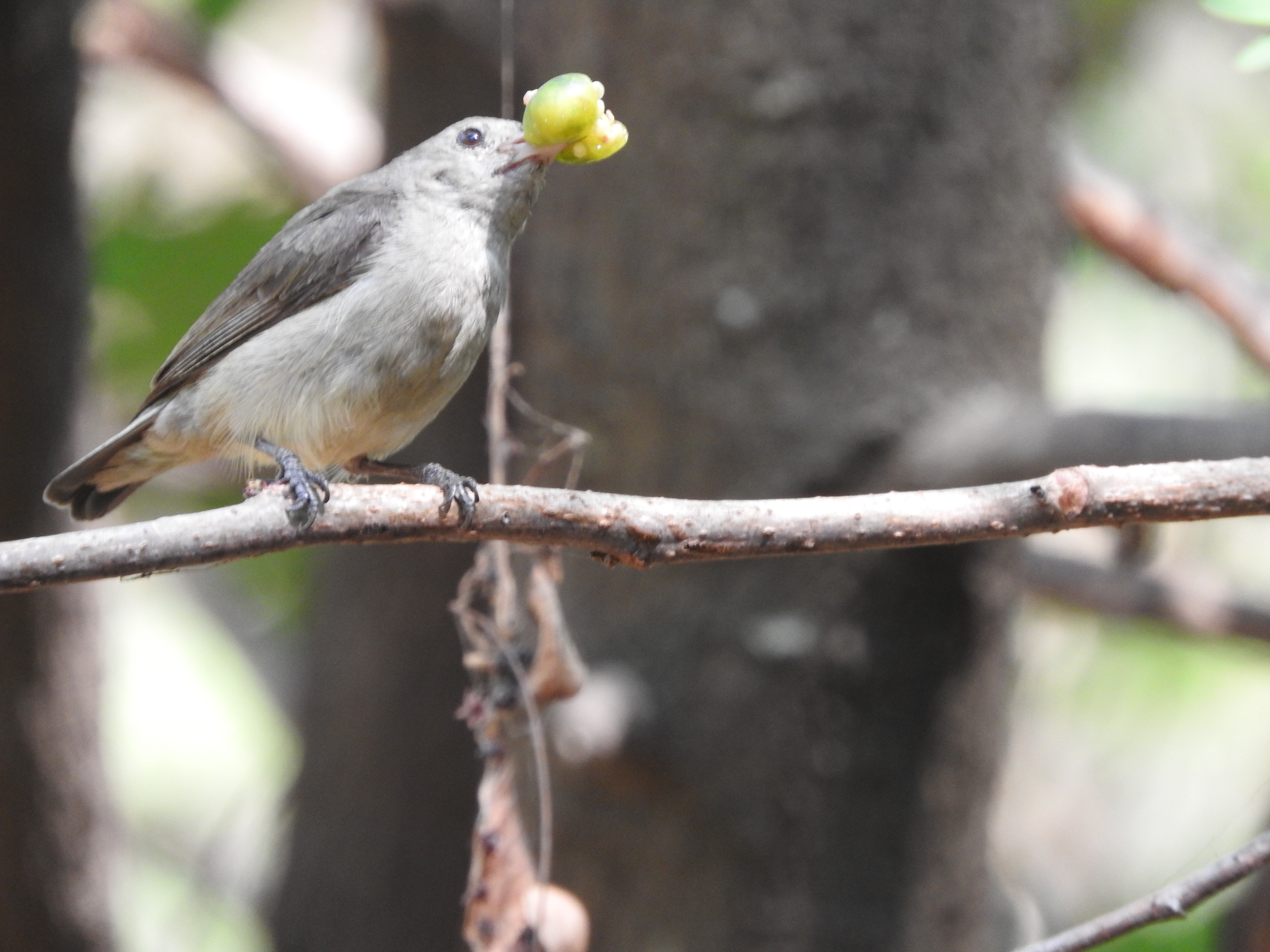

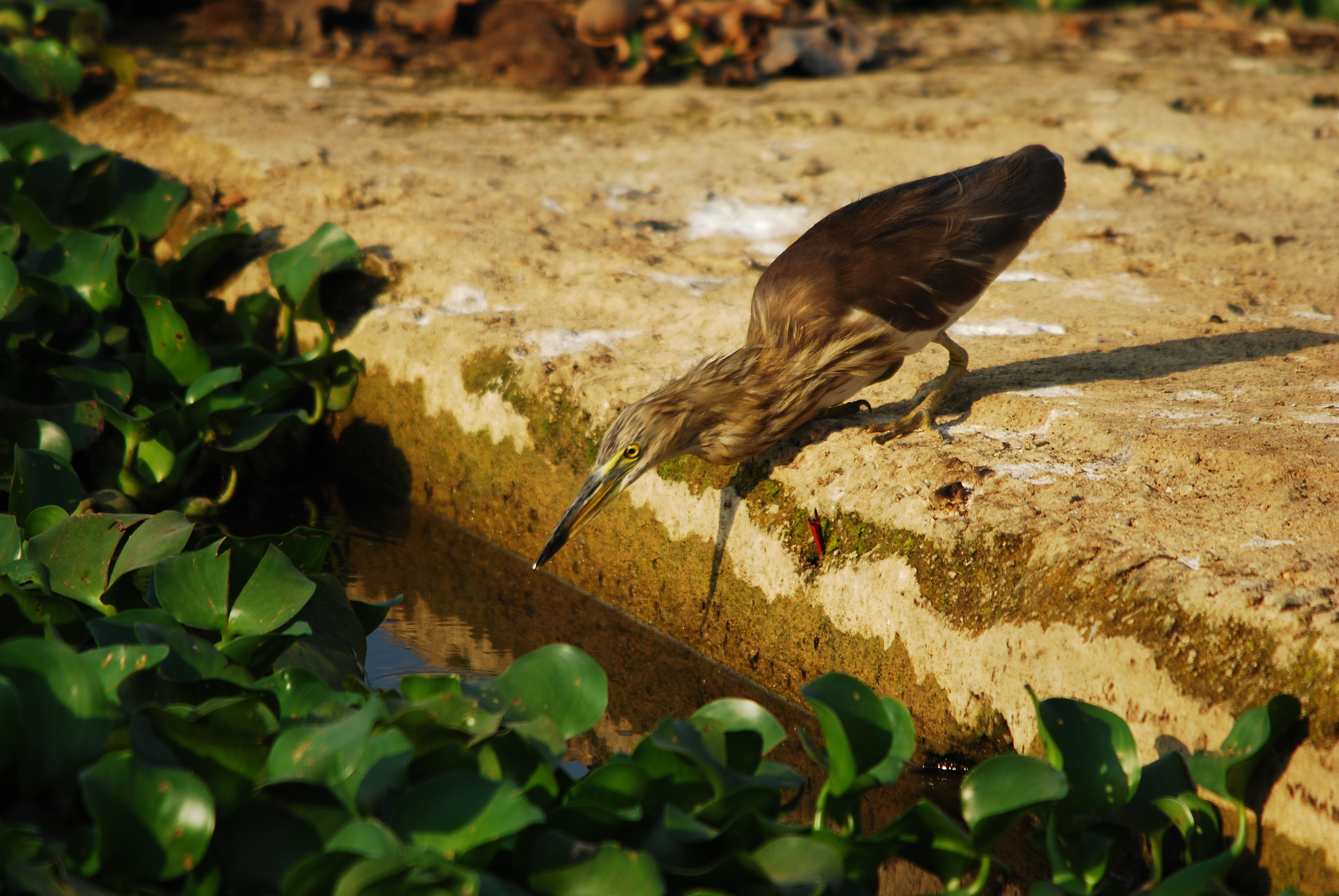

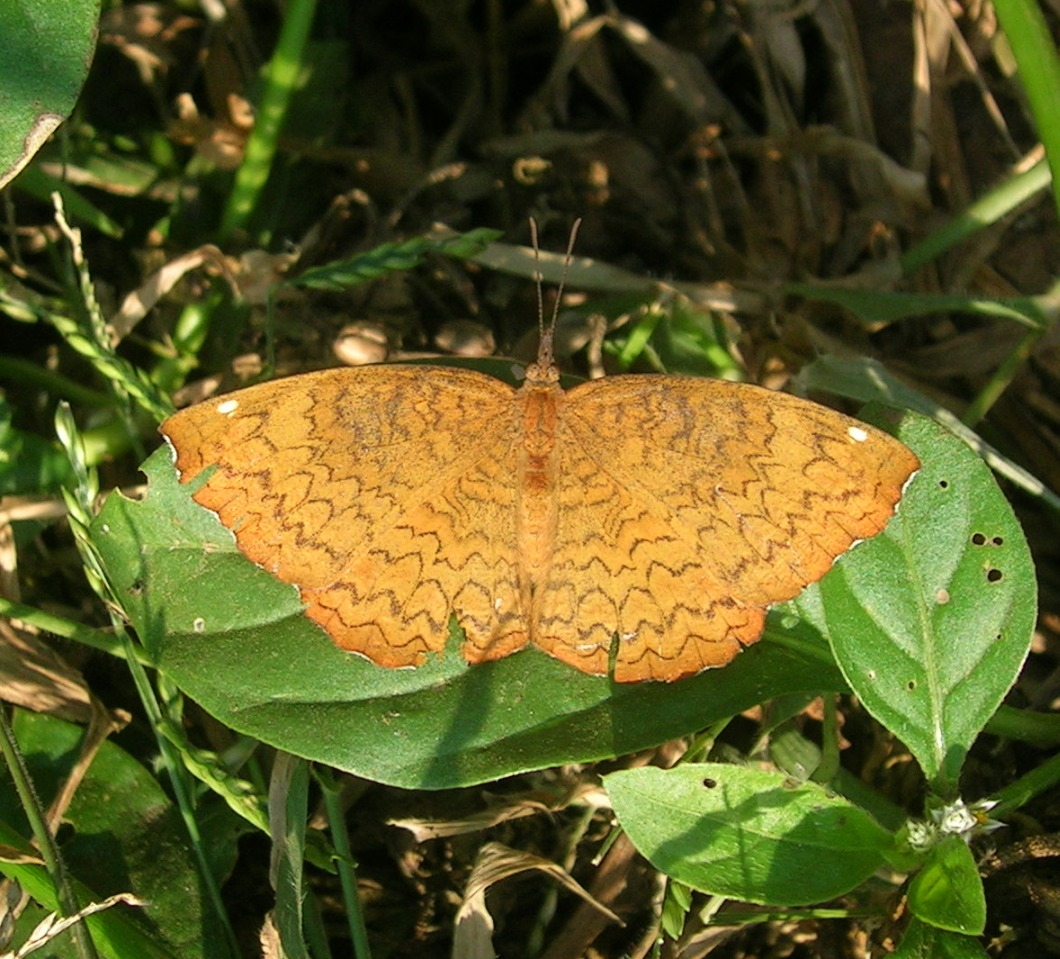

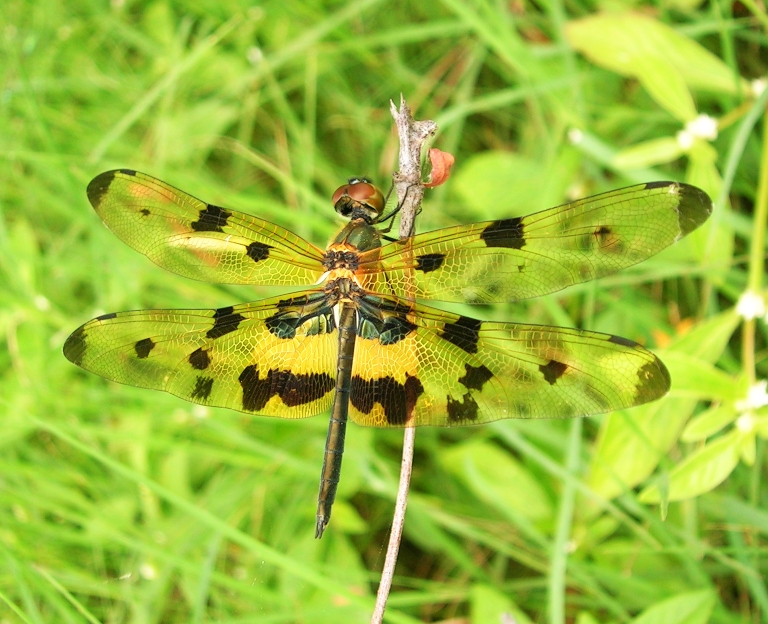

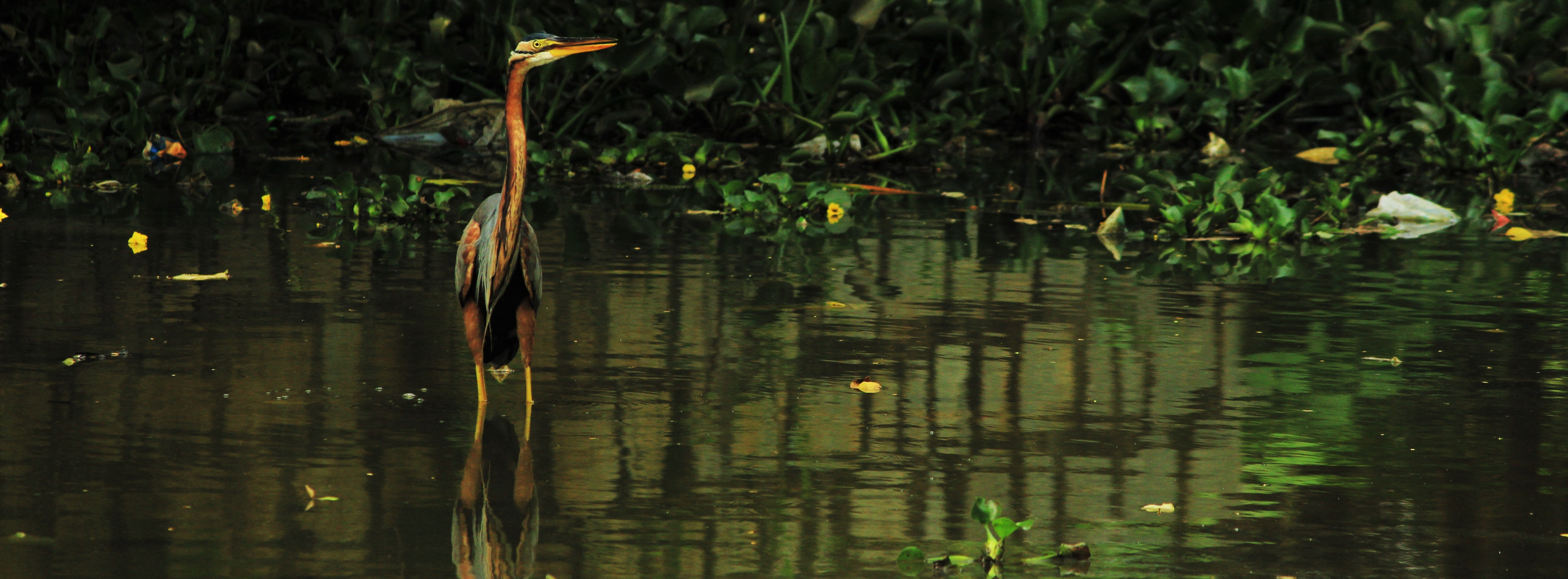

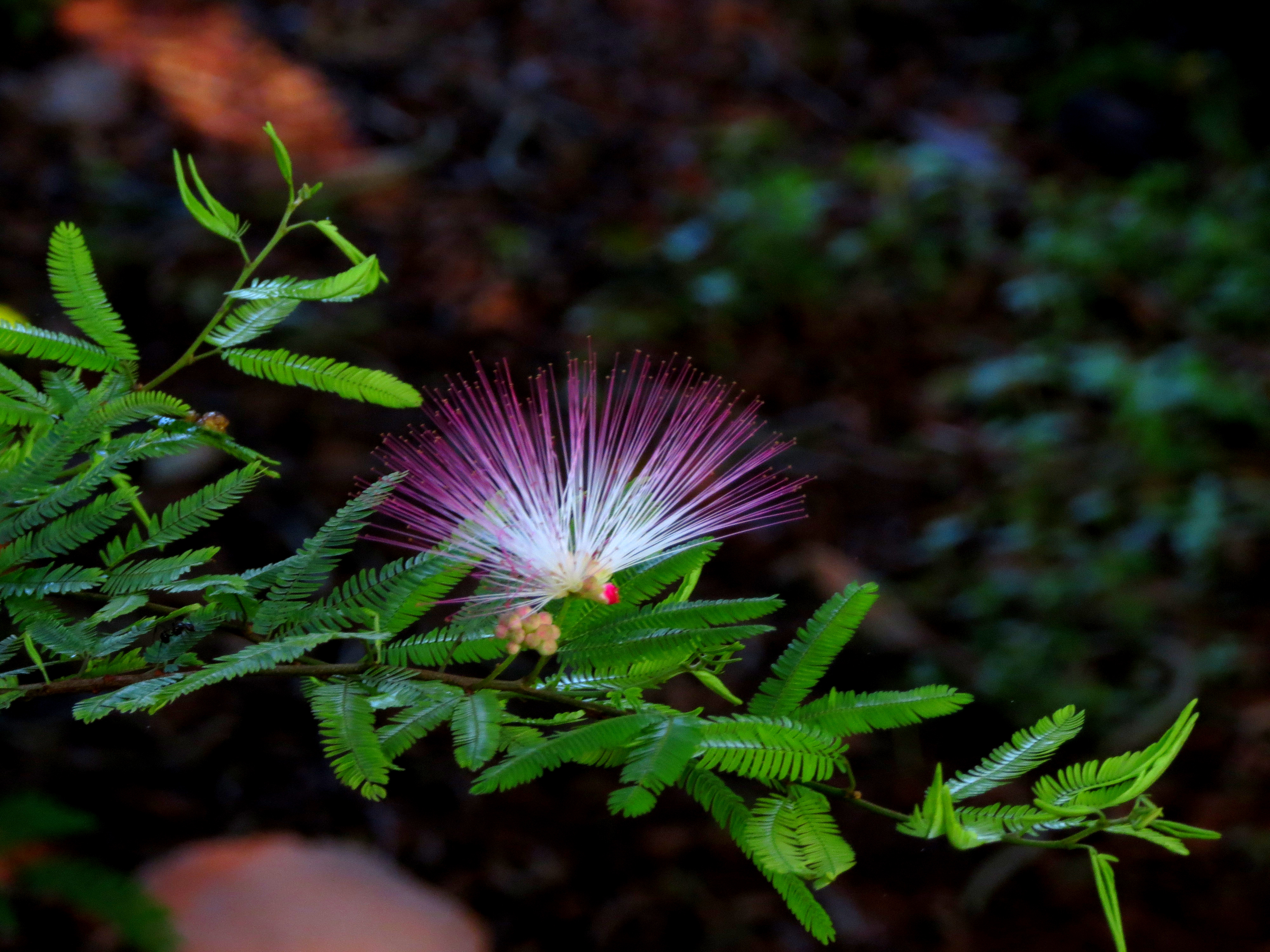

== Management ==
Historically lakes in the Bangalore region were managed by the Public Works Department, but The lake was managed by Karnataka State Forest Department. The management was transferred in 2002 to the Lake Development Authority, a non-profit society started with the aim of managing lakes in the Bangalore region.

A project for lake restoration funded under the Indo-Norwegian Environment Programme at a cost of Rs. 27 million (US$700,000) led to major changes in the ecosystem beginning in 1998. Two artificial islands were created using the soil from desilting under this project. These vegetated islands have become the roost sites of many water-birds. Desilting was ostensibly taken up in 2003 as part of this program.

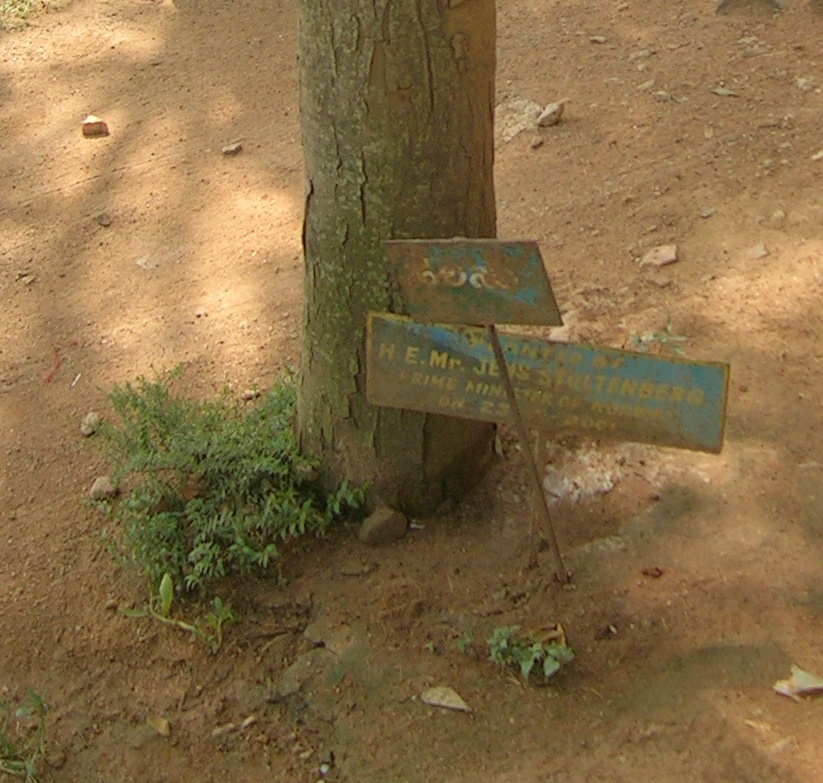
Tree planted on 23 April 2001 by the PM of Norway Jens Stoltenberg during a review of the lake under the Indo-Norwegian Environment Programme

== Citizen protests ==
Water resources are of importance in urban areas and there are a wide range of uses. In 2004 the LDA began a process of "public-private participation" where private companies bid for the lakes to "develop and maintain" them for the next 15 years. This led to a major outcry from citizen groups. The lakes at Hebbal, Nagawara and Vengaiahnakere are leased for 15 years to East India Hotels Ltd., Lumbini Developers and ParC Ltd. respectively.

The LDA leased out Hebbal Lake, one of the largest lakes in Bangalore, to East India Hotels (The Oberoi Group) for a period of 15 years for an annual lease amount of Rs. 7,210,000 and an annual escalation of 1.5% in the amount, under the Public–private partnership policy. The developments included building a boating jetty, a handicraft and curio gift centre and an island restaurant. The private bidder was also expected to undertake desilting (as done already in 2003) and they were permitted to charge entry fees. The LDA claimed that this would increase the recreation options for the people but also encourage eco-tourism, support bio-diversity, recharge ground water and help maintain eco-balance.

Precedents set in the Intellectuals Forum v. State of Andhra Pradesh judgement of the Supreme Court of India (C A No. 1251/2006), state that "the tank is a community property and the State authorities are trustees to hold and manage such properties for the benefit of the community and they cannot be allowed to commit any act or omission which will infringe the right of the community and alienate the property to any other person or body". Opposing citizen groups point out that the privatisation scheme represents a clear contempt of court. The Karnataka Fisheries Department was asked not to renew the contracts with fishermen at Hebbal Lake in violation of the privatisation agreement that stated that the move would "respect traditional rights" of the users.

The privatisation of Hebbal lake has been pointed out as a threat to the bio-diversity of these lakes, particularly the birdlife. The threats come from plans to introduce recreational facilities and human activities on the shore apart from draining and drying of the lake for various operations.
