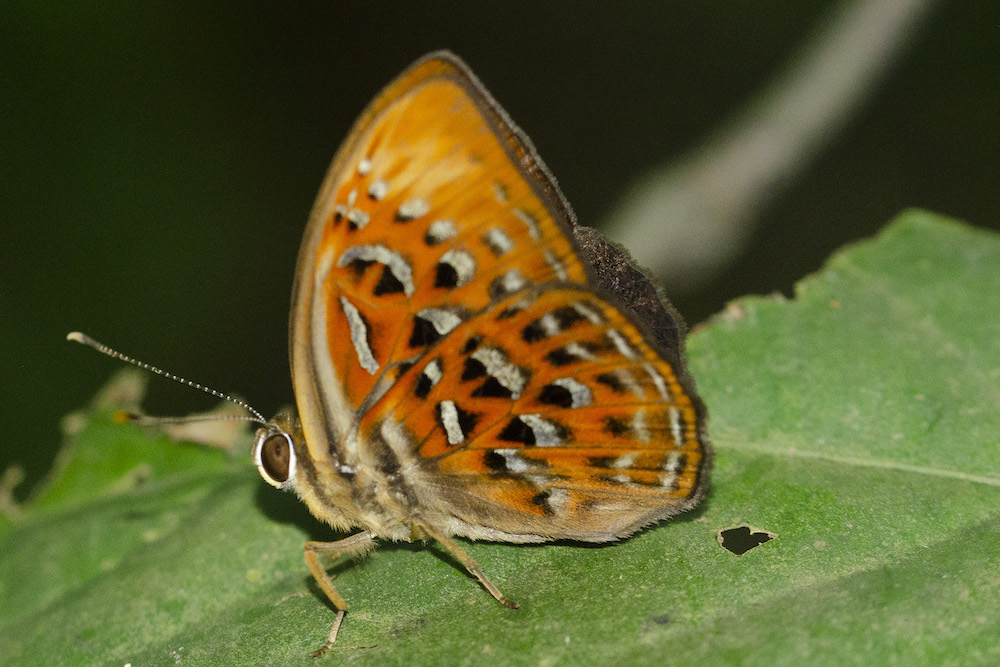
- Taxilahaquinus

Scientific classification
- Kingdom: Animalia
- Phylum: Arthropoda
- Class: Insecta
- Order: Lepidoptera
- Family: Riodinidae
- Subfamily: Nemeobiinae
- Tribe: Nemeobiini
- Subtribe: Abisarina
- Genus: Taxila; Doubleday, 1847

Type species
- Taxila haquinus (Fabricius, 1793)

= Taxila (butterfly) =

Genus of butterflies

Taxila is a genus of butterflies in the family Riodinidae. In the past, several species were included under the genus Abisara. Only three Asian species are included in the genus following revisions.

- Taxila haquinus (Fabricius, 1793) - Southeast Asia
- Taxila dora Fruhstorfer, 1904 - Laos and Vietnam
- Taxila hainana Riley & Godfrey, 1925 - Hainan
