= Henry Holland (missionary) =

English Christian medical missionary

Sir Henry Tristram Holland
- Born: 12 February 1875; Durham, England, United Kingdom
- Died: 19 September 1965 (aged 90); Farnham, Surrey, England, United Kingdom
- Citizenship: English
- Education: University of Edinburgh, graduated 1899, obtained FRCS Ed in 1907
- Known for: Medical missionary work

Sir Henry Tristram Holland (12 February 1875 – 19 September 1965) was a Christian medical missionary who travelled to India, Pakistan, Afghanistan, and Baluchistan to provide ophthalmologic surgery and care. He is known for establishing hospitals in Quetta and North Sind and is credited with saving the sight of more than 100,000 people.

== Early life and education ==
Henry Holland was born on 12 February 1875 to Canon L. W. Holland, a parish priest, in Durham, England. He lived on the banks of the Tweed River, and at the age of five, travelled around with his father. Some of his hobbies were fishing, riding, and hunting. In terms of schooling, he was tutored by his father and aunts until he was 11 and later went to Durham School and Loretto School.

== Medical studies ==
Holland enrolled in the University of Edinburgh in 1894 to become a missionary doctor, graduating in 1899 with distinctions. Then, he began visiting many educational institutions as part his position as the Travelling Secretary of the Student Volunteer Mission and also became part of the Church Missionary Society. In his last four months of his position as Travelling Secretary, he left for Quetta to replace a doctor on leave.

== In Quetta and North Sind ==
=== Quetta ===
The hospital in Quetta was a medical mission established in 1886 by British officials, mainly to treat the illnesses of tribesmen in the region. Many different tribes came to the hospital, including the Brahuis, Pathnans, Pushtus, Baluchis, Sindhis, and Punjabis. The hospital treated many different ailments including common illnesses of dysentery and malaria and surgeries for hemorrhoids, tubercular glands, and cataracts.

Having no previous hands-on experience in a hospital, Holland worked many hours alongside doctors to learn about administering treatments and performing surgery. He continued his learning by visiting hospitals in Kashmir, Punjab, and Sind and went on to take and pass medical exams in many languages including Urdu, Persian, and Pushtu. Trying to take a searcher approach, Holland went into the countryside to talk to tribespeople about their lives and their medical needs. Many mentioned cataracts and eye infections, which was not surprising due to the conditions of the area with its heat, dust, winds, flies, and unsafe water. The prevalence of cataracts and eye infections lead Holland to develop sympathy for the blind, find interest in eye care, and soon, specialize in ophthalmic surgery.

For his ophthalmologic work, he became in charge of this hospital in Quetta in 1907. From there, the hospital grew steadily due to increases in the need for ophthalmologic treatment. It began building wards so that patients could be accompanied by relatives, which was especially important for patients who travelled from afar, added extra beds, and bought an X-ray unit. By 1930, 14 wards were built for patients. In addition to physical size, the hospital also grew in the professional context. It developed a training programme for male nurses in 1926 and for dispensers in 1931.

In May 1935, however, an earthquake hit Quetta and destroyed the hospital. He returned to England to raise money for the Rebuilding Fund for the hospital. In the meantime, temporary structures were used. The reconstruction of the hospital began in 1936 and was finally completed on 6 May 1940.

=== North Sind ===
In 1909, a wealthy Hindu philanthropist invited Holland to treat patients in Shikarpur, in North Sind. Holland agreed to treat the patients for free if the philanthropist would use the money to build a hospital. In only one year, this hospital grew to be one of the largest eye clinics in the world, treating up to 600 patients at a time.

The success of this hospital became widespread. Soon, eye specialists all around the world from India to the United States came to the hospital to learn more through both observation and working. With the additional help, about 3,000 operations (1,400 for cataracts) were performed at the hospital during the two months it was open for each year. It was recorded that just Holland himself performed up to 70 cataract operations a day. Since the Shikarpur hospital's establishment, over 150,000 eye operations have been performed, including 77,600 successful cataract extractions.

Another clinic was later established in the nearby city of Khairpur, which was also in North Sind.

== Contribution to ophthalmology ==
In addition to the establishment of many successful hospital, Holland contributed to ophthalmology in his research and development of surgical procedures.

For example, Holland discovered that iridectomy and iridotomy were more effective than drainage procedures in the treatment of closed-angle glaucoma. He also found that an iridectomy could help with the high intraocular pressures of a cataract patient and defer cataract surgery.

Moreover, Holland's specific iridectomy and iridotomy methods were able to remove the danger of the iris prolapsing and, thus, simplify and improve postoperative treatment. This included allowing movement after surgery and being able to eat a normal diet as opposed to a liquid diet, both of which contributed to the patient's wellbeing in the recovery process.

Holland's successful methods were very precisely documented by Dr. Anderson Hilding, who had visited the Shikarpur hospital to learn through observation and experience.

Excerpt:

Optic iridectomy was performed on a great number of these patients. One routine step in this operation was the production of prolapse of the iris purposely. After a limbic incision was made with a Graefe knife, the knife was turned, and with the end of the handle, a quick little push was made against the opposite side of the eye just posterior to the limbus. As a result, the iris would promptly herniate. It becomes unnecessary for the patient to lie so exceedingly still in bed. Coughing, sneezing, vomiting or straining at stool do not carry the danger with them that they otherwise do. The patients in this series were allowed to sit up in bed the day after operation and in a chair on the second postoperative day. There seems to be no reason why such patients should not sit up immediately after the operation if they so desire.

Henry Holland and his son, Ronald Holland, also performed various methods of intracapsular cataract extraction and provides commentary on under what circumstances the "Smith method" should be used and how it should be done.

Excerpt:

I admit that for the beginner the Smith operation is much more difficult than either the extracapsular or the intracapsular extraction with forceps. We have had 138 visiting surgeons at our Shikarpur clinic, and I always impress on them that no one should attempt an intracapsular Smith operation until he has done at least 50 or more extracapsular extractions. Furthermore, the Smith operation should not be done if a surgeon does only about 5 or 6 cataract extractions a month. It is an' operation in which it is necessary to preserve one's sense of touch by constant practice. Having had 38 years of experience I consider that as far as I am concerned the Smith operation is the best for extraction of ordinary senile cataracts, and is the least traumatic procedure to the eye of any method.

=== Later years ===
Holland retired in March 1948. In June 1949, he received the Lawrence of Arabia Memorial Medal from Field Marshal Earl Wavell for his "outstanding work for the people of Baluchistan and Afghanistan." In 1958, he published an autobiographical work titled Frontier Doctor.

== Personal life ==
In 1906, a nurse, Effie Tunbridge, began working the hospital at Quetta. Holland married her four years later. They had two sons, Harry and Ronald, and a daughter, Esme. Ronald would later join his father and play a key role in his work on the Quetta frontier. Together, they would perform on as many as 200 to 300 outpatients a day, totaling to more than 150,000 eye operations through the Shikarpur clinic.

== Family ==
- grandson of Tristram Holland (residentiary Canon of Durham)
- (paternal side) grandson of Vicar of Walmer Beach ad chaplain to Duke of Wellington
- second son of Canon L. W. Holland (a parish priest)
- father of elder son Harry and Ronald Holland, and daughter Esme
- husband of Effie Tunbridge
- three grandsons

== Recognition and awards ==
- 1910: Kaisar-i-Hind Silver Medal
- 1925: Gold Medal
- 1931: with a bar
- 1929: Companion of the Order of the Indian Empire
- 1936: Knight Bachelor
- 1949: Lawrence of Arabia Memorial Medal
- 1960: Ramon Magsaysay Award (Manila)
