= Shikarpur Christian Hospital =

Pakistani hospital

Geography
- Location: Shikarpur, Sindh, Pakistan
- Coordinates: 27°56′48″N 68°38′31″E

Organisation
- Care system: Public
- Religious affiliation: Indus Christian Fellowship

History
- Opened: 1957

Links
- Lists: Hospitals in Pakistan

Shikarpur Christian Hospital (SCH) is a hospital in Shikarpur, Sindh, Pakistan. It is part of Indus Christian Fellowship.

== History ==
Shikarpur Christian Hospital (SCH) was founded by Maybel Bruce, a missionary from the Conservative Baptist Foreign Missionary Society (now WorldVenture), who arrived in Pakistan in January 1957. The hospital was established to address the healthcare needs of women and children in the region, combining medical treatment with educational and preventive medicine.

The construction of SCH began in 1965 when missionary Frank Dobra purchased land in Shikarpur. Initially, temporary clinics in Shikarpur and Larkana provided outpatient services, home deliveries, and prenatal care. The hospital was officially inaugurated at its permanent site in Shikarpur in April 1969, with facilities including an outpatient department, offices, a laboratory, a pharmacy, surgical and medical wards, and a chapel.

In 1988, an operating-delivery block was added to expand the hospital's services.

SCH gained recognition particularly under the leadership of Maybel Bruce, who was known for performing vesicovaginal fistula surgery. The hospital's staff comprises international healthcare workers from Canada, the United States, England, and New Zealand. The hospital also runs a nurses' aide training program and engages in community health outreach to contribute to local community development.
