= Baitalpur =

- town
- Location in Chhattisgarh, India Baitalpur (India)
- Coordinates: 21°51′0″N 81°55′0″E
- Country: India
- State: Chhattisgarh
- District: Mungeli
- Bethel: 1886
- Founder: Rev.A. Spell
- Named for: Leper's asylum

Government
  - Type: Republic of India
  - Body: Gram panchayt
- Elevation: 248 m (814 ft)

Population (2011)
  - Total: approx 3,000
- Demonym: all

Languages
  - Official: Hindi, English Chhattisgarhi
- Time zone: UTC+5:30 (IST)
- PIN: 495224
- Vehicle registration: CG
- Nearest city: Bilaspur

Baitalpur is a town in Mungeli district, Chhattisgarh, India. A historic place since 1897, still serving and providing medical treatment for people affected by leprosy. A Lepers asylum was started in 1897 by Rev. K. W. Nottrott, which is now The Leprosy Mission Trust India.

The Kaisar-i-Hind Medal for Public Service in India was a medal awarded by the British monarch between 1900 and 1947. It was awarded to Reverend John Henry Schultz, who was the Superintendent of Chandkhuri Leprosy Hospital & Home Baitalpur, Acharya Vinoba Bhave on 28 January 1964. On 24 November 1933, Mahatma Gandhi also visited this place.

== Geography ==
Baitalpur is located at an elevation of 248 metres (814 ft).

== Location ==
Baitalpur is 30 km from Bilaspur. The nearest airport is Chakarbhatta Airport. Bilaspur Junction is the nearest railway station.

National Highway 200 passes through Baitalpur. Ghuthia is the nearest village.
