= St. Teresa's Hospital, Mirpurkhas =

Hospital in Mirpurkhas, Sindh, Pakistan

Geography
- Location: Mirpurkhas, Sindh, Pakistan
- Coordinates: 25°31′38″N 69°00′25″E

Organisation
- Care system: Public
- Religious affiliation: Franciscan Sisters of the Heart of Jesus

History
- Opened: 1947

Links
- Lists: Hospitals in Pakistan

St. Teresa's Hospital (Urdu: سینٹ ٹریسا ہسپتال میرپورخاص) is a hospital in Mirpurkhas, Sindh, Pakistan.

== History ==
St Teresa's Hospital was established in 1947 by Bishop Alcuin van Miltenburg, a Dutch Franciscan missionary, in collaboration with H.M.A. Drago, a Catholic doctor. Initially established as a small clinic, the hospital expanded to a 92-bed facility in 1956. The hospital's early operations, supported by Dutch and German medical volunteers, focused particularly on addressing the needs of refugees and the local Christian community during the partition period.

In 1971, Bishop Bonaventure Paul of Hyderabad handed over the administration of the hospital to the Medical Mission Sisters. A year later, the Midwifery School, started in 1968, gained accreditation. It offered an 18-month course in Urdu, supported by the international agency Misereor.

In 1987, St. Teresa's Hospital narrowed its focus to obstetrics and gynaecology due to a shortage of medical staff. The hospital had initiated an outreach program back in 1972, collaborating with government immunization initiatives and the Rattanabad Agriculture Extension programme. However, in 1985, the government took over the immunization programs that the hospital had been collaborating on.

The 1980s witnessed further administrative evolution, with Sr Francis Webster conducting a survey of Catholic medical works and Sr Katherine Jobson establishing a Diocesan Medical Board. Jobson, presumably in a role connected to the hospital, also developed a preventive healthcare program for the Christian Hospital Association of Pakistan and facilitated training for traditional birth attendants.

In 2004, the Franciscan Sisters of the Heart of Jesus assumed control of St. Teresa's Hospital, responding to challenges in personnel and funding.
