= Taxila Christian Hospital =

Hospital in Taxila, Punjab

Geography
- Location: Taxila, Punjab, Pakistan
- Coordinates: 33°44′46″N 72°48′12″E

Organisation
- Religious affiliation: Presbyterian Church of the United States

History
- Opened: August 1920

Links
- Website: chtaxila.com

The Taxila Christian Hospital (Urdu: ٹیکسلا کرسچن ہسپتال), also known as Christian Hospital Taxila, is an eye hospital in Taxila, Punjab, Pakistan. It is located on 30 acres adjacent to the remnants of the Gandhara civilization.

It is one of the largest eye care facilities in Pakistan.

== History ==
Taxila Christian Hospital was founded in 1920 by the Presbyterian Church of the United States. In 1921, a piece of land was acquired which was located roughly 20 miles west of Rawalpindi. The acquisition process involved 23 separate deed transactions, with the landowners demanding payment in cash, resulting in the transportation of silver coins from Rawalpindi to Taxila via a bullock cart.

The hospital's first surgical operation took place in 1922 inside a tent, conducted by Dr. Gregory Martin, with only a lantern for illumination and the assistance of an individual named Gordon.

Until the late 1940s, the hospital served as a healthcare provider to the local community. The focus shifted towards ophthalmology with the arrival of Dr. Norval Christy and Dr. Kargaard in 1947. Later in 1957 Dr Ernest Lall and Dr Pramila Lall came to Taxila Christian Hospital and the hospital started making headlines

On August 9, 2002, a grenade attack on the hospital's chapel resulted in four fatalities, including two nurses and a paramedic, and injured 25 others.

== Medical directors ==
- Dr. J. G. Martin, M.D — (1922–1935)
- Dr. A. J. Jongewaard, M.D — (1925–1926)
- Dr. H. L. Finley, M.D — (1935–1936)
- Dr. N. Flower, M.B.Ch — (1926–1938)
- Dr. S. Bergsma, M.D — (1938–1943)
- Dr. J. Vroon, M.D — (1943–1947)
- Dr. A. Karsgaard, M.D — (1947–1951)
- Dr. N. E. Christy, M.D — (1951–1965)
- Dr. O. A. Brown, M.D — (1954–1962)
- Dr. Ernest Lall, M.B.B.S — (1965–1991) As Medical superintendent – As M.D (1991–2001)
- Dr. Ashchenaz M. Lall — (1991–2001) As Medical superintendent – As M.D (2001–2024)
- Dr. Nadeem David — (2024 till date)
