= Hebbal, Bengaluru =

Neighbourhood in Bengaluru urban, Karnataka, India 560024

Hebbal Hebbal
- Neighbourhood
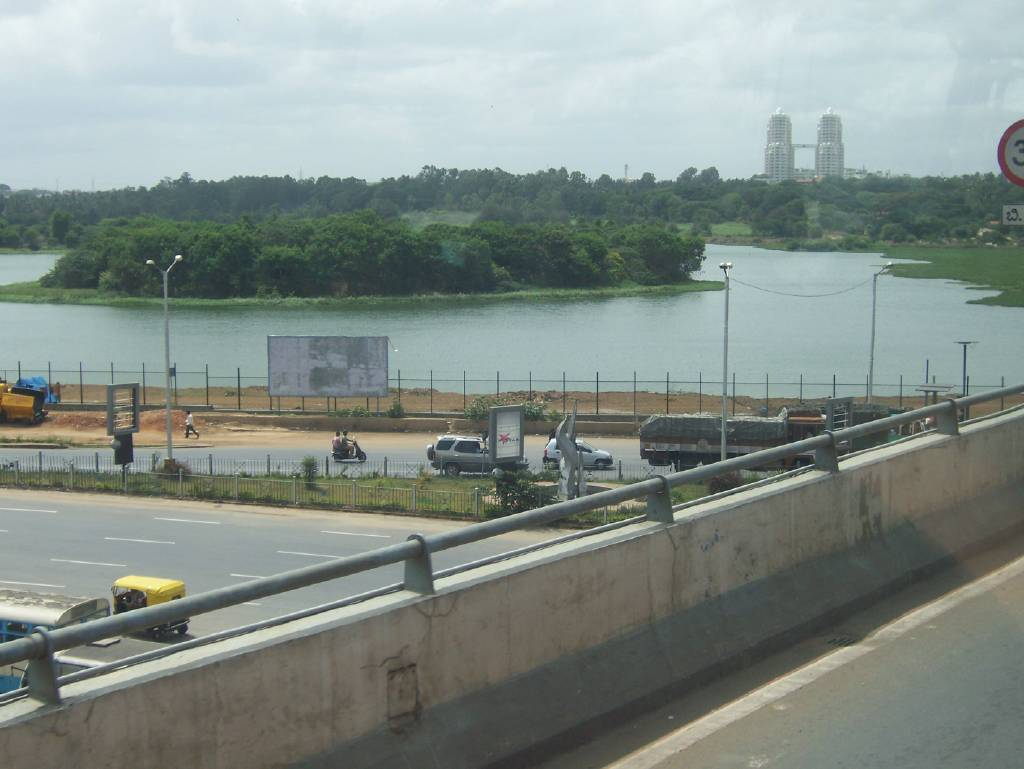
- Hebbal Lake seen from flyover

- Location within Bengaluru
- Coordinates: 13.04°N 77.59°E
- Country: India
- State: Karnataka
- City: Bengaluru
- Named for: Hebbal Lake

Population (Census 2017)
  - Total: 154,899

Languages
  - Official: Kannada
- Time zone: UTC+5:30 (IST)
- PIN Code: 560006,560024,560032,560045
- Vehicle registration: KA-04

Hebbal is a neighbourhood in Bengaluru, Karnataka, India, which was once indicative of the north endpoint of the city. Though originally famous for Hebbal Lake, it is now better known for the serpentine maze of flyovers that network the Outer Ring Road and Airport Road on NH 44. The flyover spans a length of 5.23 kilometres (3.2 mi) over all the loops combined. The flyover was built by Gammon India. The lake area in Hebbal is well known for its picnic spots, a well-maintained park, boating facilities and the birdwatching opportunities.

Hebbal used to be the end of the municipal corporation limits. One can still see the milestone between the Baptist hospital and checkpost. Bengaluru has now grown quite a bit towards north, beyond these marks. L&T factory, which was established in the 1970s, is also close to Hebbal. GKVK University and Manyata Tech Park with a number of office buildings and commercial enterprises makes Hebbal an attractive investment spot.

== History ==
Historians have suggested that the vicinity of Hebbal Lake to the area has made Hebbal possibly one of the oldest inhabited areas in Bengaluru. An inscription stone dating back to 750 AD was found near Maaramma temple in Hebbala which describes what may be the first-named Bengalurean, Kittayya. The stone describes an attack by Rashtrakuta raiders against whom he defended Perbolal, a name that morphed into Hebbal over the years. Historian B N Sundar Rao in his seminal work 'Bengaluru Itihasa', has also theorized that Kempegowda borrowed the name Bengaluru from a hamlet to the northwest of Hebbal Lake.

== Transport ==
=== Roads ===
All arterial roads and road networks leading to the Kemapegowda International Airport intersect at Hebbal. Further, BIAL has its office on the National Highway (NH 44) exit of the Hebbal flyover in Gayathri Lake Front. Due to short-sightedness of the governing authorities, the Hebbal Flyover has become a bottle-neck for traffic flow from the city centre towards North and the same when traveling from North to city centre. Traffic is crawling be it any time of the day. This is because almost 6 lanes coming from each side, jostle to fit in the two lane Hebbal bridge bringing the traffic to a stand still.

=== Buses ===
Hebbal is connected by BMTC and KSRTC buses. From the city, bus services are available to most places in Bengaluru. lt is also a connecting point for travellers from the Kempegowda International Airport and Dodaballapura. Hebbal also has a railway station and a suburban station is being constructed as a part of the Bangalore Suburban railway line .
