= Qalandarabad, Pakistan =

Small city in Khyber Pakhtunkhwa, Pakistan

Coordinates: 34°15′51.9″N 73°14′20.0″E

Qalandarabad is a small city in Abbottabad Tehsil, Abbottabad District, Khyber Pakhtunkhwa, Pakistan. It is approximately 6 kilometres (3.7 mi) north of the district headquarters of Abbottabad. this City is Known in the world by its local dish Known as Chapli Kabab. Qalandarabad is a lush green city covered by green hills.
