= Thindlu =

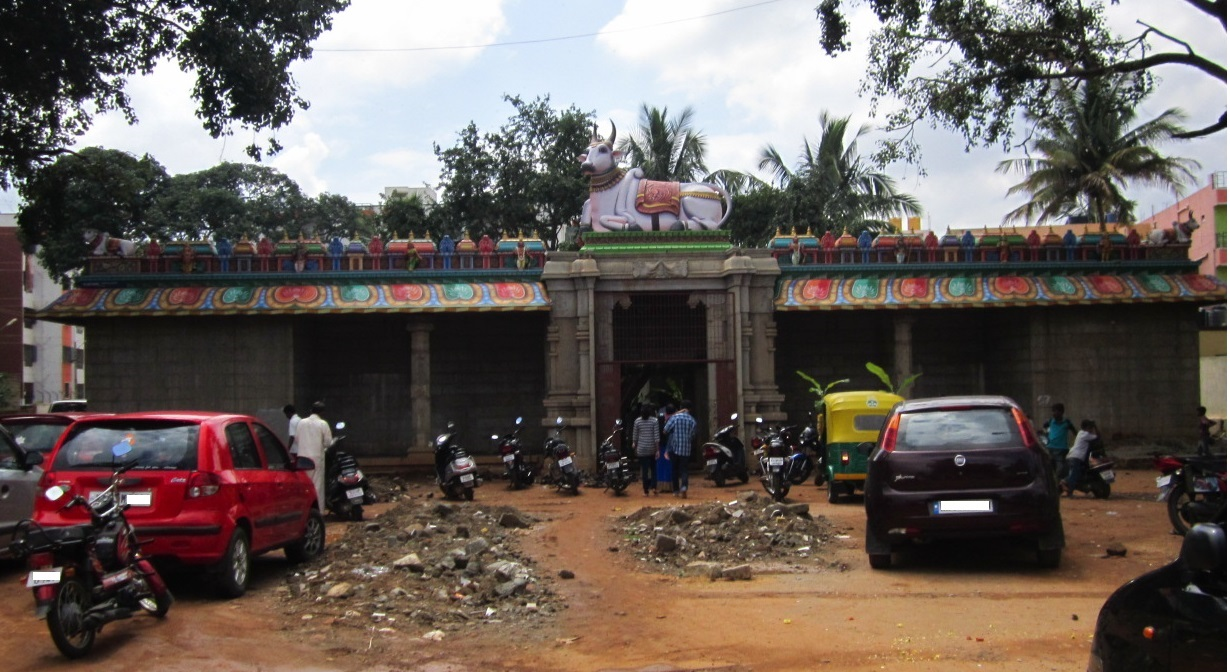
- A view of 1000-year-old temple dedicated to lord Veerabhadra

- Location within Karnataka
- Coordinates: 13.072749°N 77.568091°E
- Country: India
- State: Karnataka
- Metro: Bangalore

Languages
  - Official: Kannada
- Time zone: UTC+5:30 (IST)
- PIN: 560097

Thindlu, once an ancient village, is now a part of the Bangalore North. Thindlu is famous for its ancient temple of lord Virabhadra (a form lord Shiva) and is currently a thriving community with many real estate constructions. Thindlu comes under Vidyaranyapura ward of Byatarayanapura constituency. Byatarayanapura is one of the largest constituency of Bangalore. Many residential layouts have recently come up. Thindlu is located to the east of Vidyaranyapura and to the west of Sahakara Nagar. Once a rural village, it has now become very well integrated to Bengaluru city style. With many new residential apartments and with the influx of people this area does not resemble anymore like an rural village, although some areas still retain Village type old houses. Although declining, Animal husbandry can still be witnessed here like any other part of Bangalore Rural district.

== Residential Layouts ==
Thindlu has many residential layouts and many of the residential houses are recently built. Before these layouts were constructed, this area was a forest and as a result, snakes are sometimes witnessed in this area. Residential areas include Bullet Krishnappa Layout, Canara Bank Layout, Sir M Visvesvaraya Layout, Tennis Village and many more. There are also many newly built multi storey residential apartments. Tennis village which is 5 minutes walkway from Thindlu circle has tennis court as well as swimming pool for its members and was founded by Mahesh Bhupathi. Population of Thindlu has grown from few hundreds to large numbers due to its proximity to many educational and leading organisations such as Bharath Electronics Limited, Indian Institute of Science, TIFR Centre for Applicable Mathematics, Jawaharlal Nehru Centre for Advanced Scientific Research, Larsen & Toubro and many more. Thindlu is just a walkaway distance from National Centre for Biological Sciences and University of Agricultural Sciences, Bangalore. Manyata Embassy Park which houses global giant companies such as Phillips is 20 minutes drive from this area. There is a new double road constructed that runs from MS Palya to Canara bank Layout via Vidyaranyapura and Thindlu. A new building is constructed at Canara bank layout at the end of the double road for National Centre for Biological Sciences. This new building is two-minute drive from Thindlu circle on the double road. There is also a beautiful park in this area where many people come for walking. Compared to nearby areas such as Vidyaranyapura and Sahakara Nagar, house rent and real estate prices are very much lower in Thindlu and Kodigehalli and this is also one of the reasons for the rapid development of residential layouts.

== Temples ==
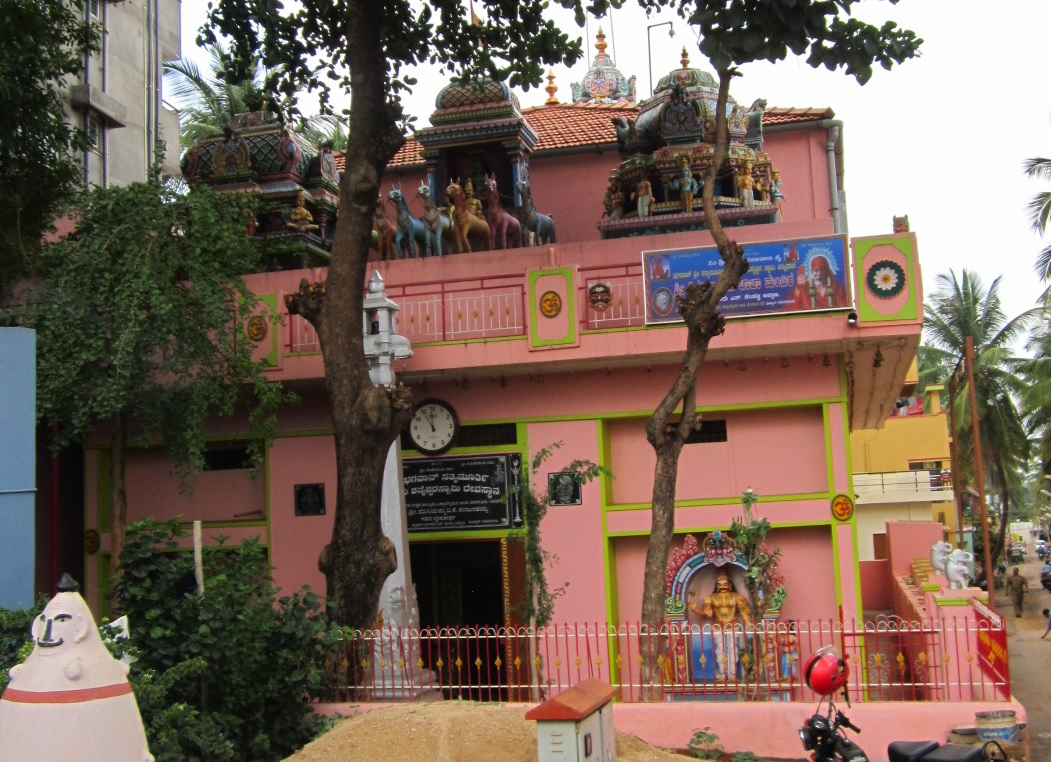
Guru Shaneeshwara Temple at Thindlu

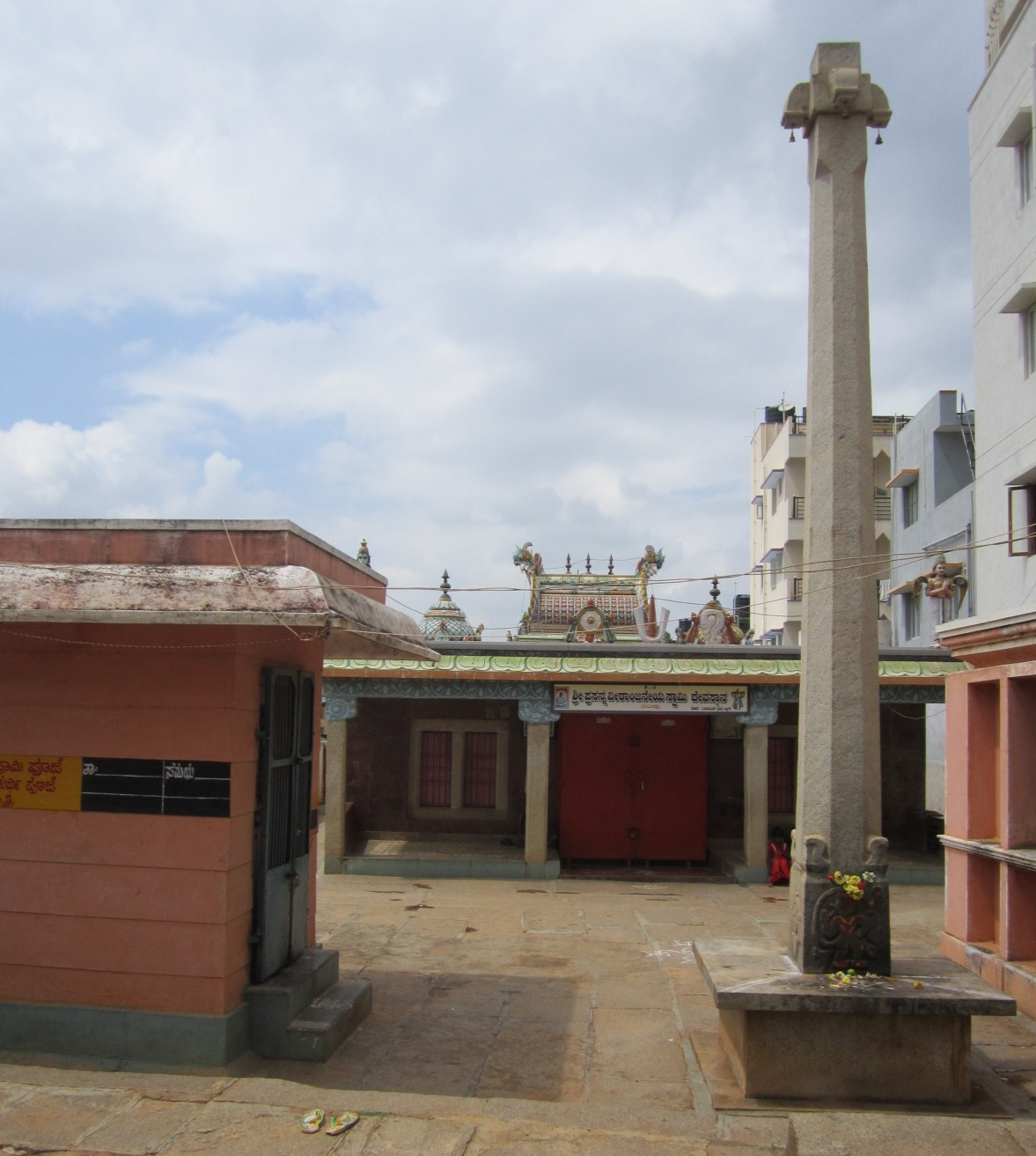
A view of Anjeneya Temple at Thindlu

This area has many old Hindu temples dedicated to Lord Guru Shaneeshwara Saturn, Lord Anjaneya or Hanuman and Lord Virabhadra. It is believed that the Murti of lord hanuman existed many hundreds of years earlier and the temple was built only recently. Anjaneya temple is very near to veerabhadra temple and is situated on the main road that leads to Nanjappa circle. Sri Veerabhadra Swamy temple is estimated to be 1000 years old and was recently renovated. The famous Kalika Durga Parameshwari temple at Vidyaranyapura is just walkable distance from Thindlu circle. There is also a Shri Dodamma devi temple at thindlu circle which is being renovated. Ancient traditions such as Jathres and Firewalking is practised even today in Veerabhadra temple of Thindlu on religious festivals.

== Transportation ==
There are many buses connecting prominent areas of Bengaluru to Thindlu. BMTC route number 288 runs from Thindlu to K. R. Market and vice versa and route number 288H runs from thindlu to Kempegowda Bus Station and vice versa. Route number 288 is also one of the oldest BMTC routes. BMTC route number 288E connects Vidyaranyapura to CV Raman Nagar via Thindlu. In the below table, important bus routes that passes Thindlu is given. Many more buses operate from Vidyaranyapura via Nanjappa circle to all parts of the city which is a ten-minute walk away from Thindlu. Nearest railway station is Kodigehalli railway station which is ten minutes walkway from Thindlu circle. This station was recently electrified and was made Double track. Many passenger trains stop here and one such train is Chik Ballapur – Bangalore Passenger which also stops at Nandi Halt station Nandi Hills, India. One can board this train from Kodigehalli to visit this beautiful hills. Due to increasing traffic jams, an underpass is constructed at Kodigehalli-Thindlu main road that intersects this railway station.

BMTC Route No	Origin	Destination	Route
288	KR Market	Thindlu	Majestic, Mekhri Circle, Ganganagar, Hebbal, Kodigehalli
288H	Majestic	Thindlu	Majestic, Mekhri Circle, Ganganagar, Hebbal, Kodigehalli
288F	Majestic	Kodigehalli	Mathikere, BEL Circle, Thindlu
288E/ 314	CV Raman Nagar	Vidyaranyapura	Thindlu, Hebbal, RT Nagar, Shivajinagar
401H	Yelahanka	Yeshvantpur	GKVK, Kodigehalli, Thindlu, BEL Circle, Mathikere
288M	Vidyaranyapura	Kempegowda Bus Stand	Thindlu-Sahakara Nagar
276B	Thindlu(virupakshapura)	Kempegowda Bus Stand	Nanjappa Circle, BEL Circle, Malleswaram

== See also ==
- Vidyaranyapura
- Kodigehalli
- Sahakara Nagar
