= Kodigehalli inscriptions and hero stones =

The area encompassing Kodigehalli and its sub-localities—Tindlu and Doddabommasandra—in Bengaluru contains several epigraphical and sculptural artifacts dating primarily from the 14th to 16th centuries CE. These include three Kannada inscriptions and two hero stones (Viragal, commemorative stones for fallen warriors). The name "Kodigehalli" likely originates from the Kannada words kodige (grant) and halli (village), possibly referencing a land grant detailed in one of the inscriptions found here. Over time, Kodigehalli became the predominant name for the area, largely replacing the older name, Virupakshapura, although a locality named Virupakshapura still exists within modern Kodigehalli.

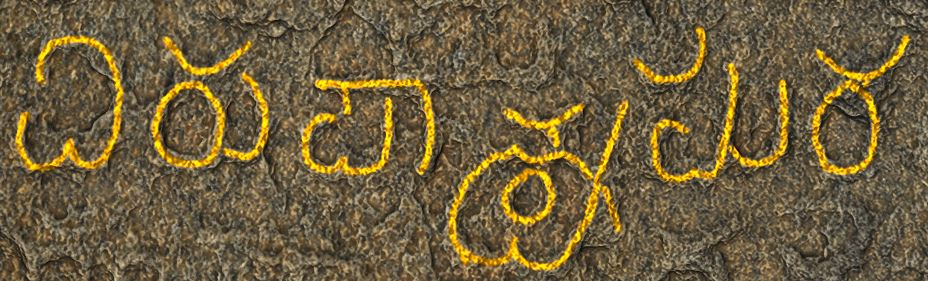
Digital Image of a place name virupākṣapura Obtained by 3D Scanning of The Kodigehalli 1431CE Inscription of Prathaparaya's Donation to God Someyadeva.

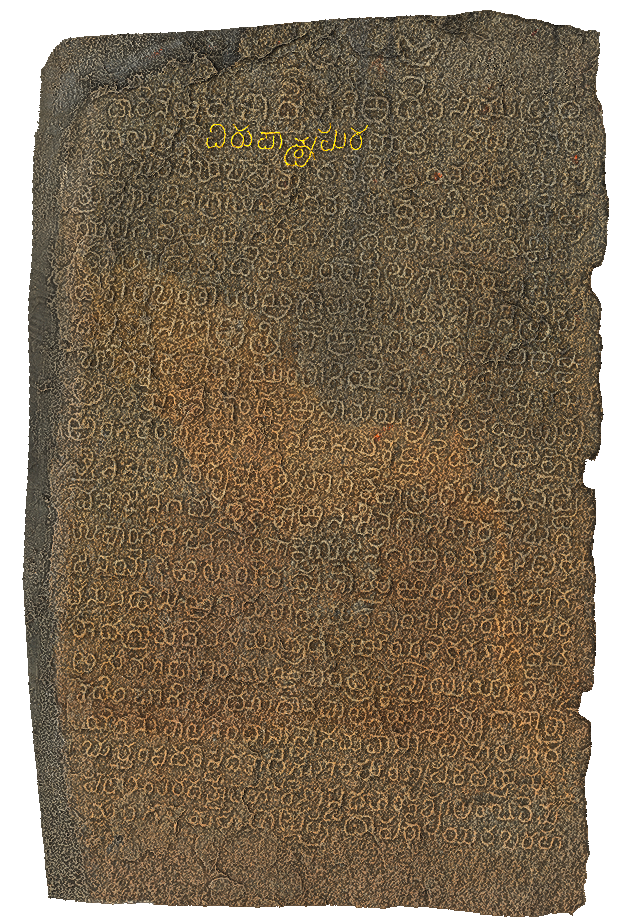
Digital Image Highlighting the Place Name 'Virupākṣapura' in the Kodigehalli 1431CE Inscription of Prathaparaya's Donation to God Someyadeva.

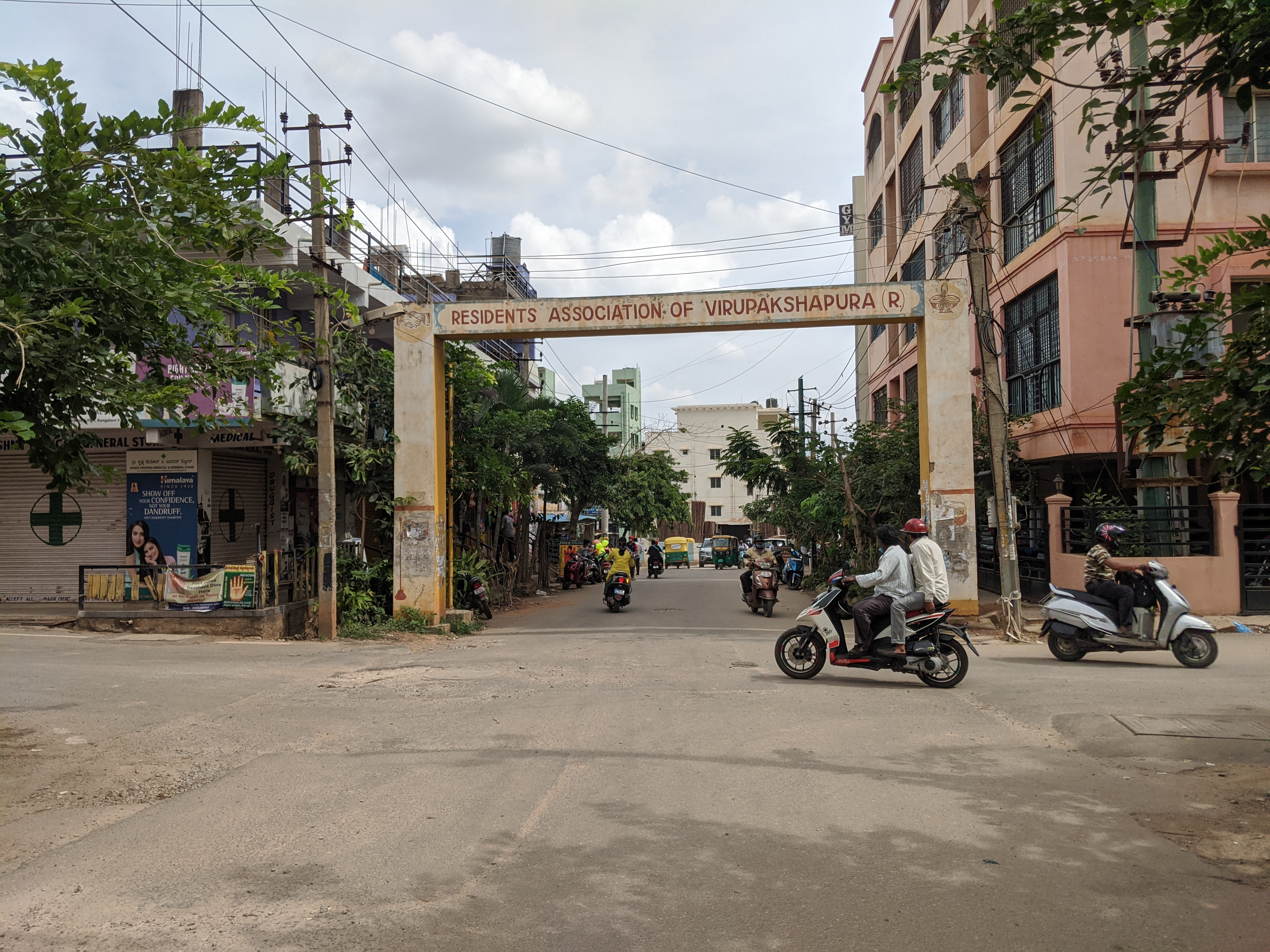
Street view of the Entrance to Virupakshapura, a locality within Kodigehalli.

Among the findings is a Kannada inscription attributed to Prataparaya, dating to 1431 CE, which records a donation made during a solar eclipse to the Someyadeva temple in Sakanasamudra. This inscription contributes to Indian astronomical history by providing a specific date, 9 August 1431 CE (Julian calendar), linked to a solar eclipse, an event corroborated by NASA's Five Millennium Catalogue Of Solar Eclipses. The inscription's text has been published in Volume 9 of Epigraphia Carnatica, a key source for inscriptions in the region, and has been digitally archived by the Mythic Society. Two other inscriptions, from Tindlu and Doddabommasandra, date to the 14th and 15th centuries CE, respectively. The Tindlu inscription documents a donation by medieval merchant guilds, offering insights into historical trade practices. The Doddabommasandra inscription records a donation to an Agrahara (a settlement granted to Brahmins for learning and religious duties). In addition to the inscriptions, Kodigehalli houses two hero stones, which feature sculptures commemorating individuals who died in battle but lack accompanying inscriptions.

== Kodigehalli inscription (1431 CE): Prataparaya's Donation to God Someyadeva ==
Kodigehalli 1431CE Inscription of Prathaparaya's Donation to God Someyadeva
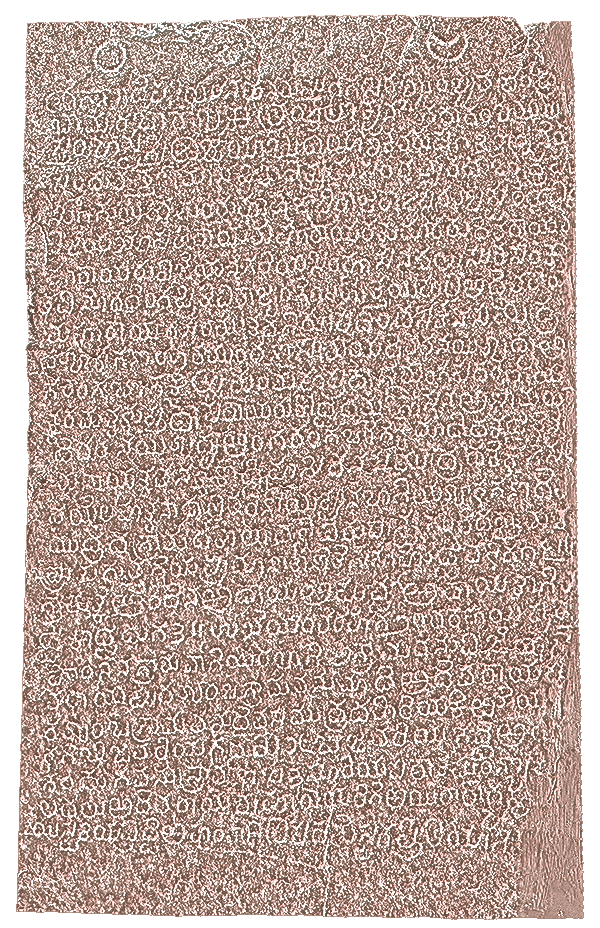
- Digital Image of the Kodigehalli 1431CE Inscription of Prathaparaya's Donation to God Someyadeva - Front Side

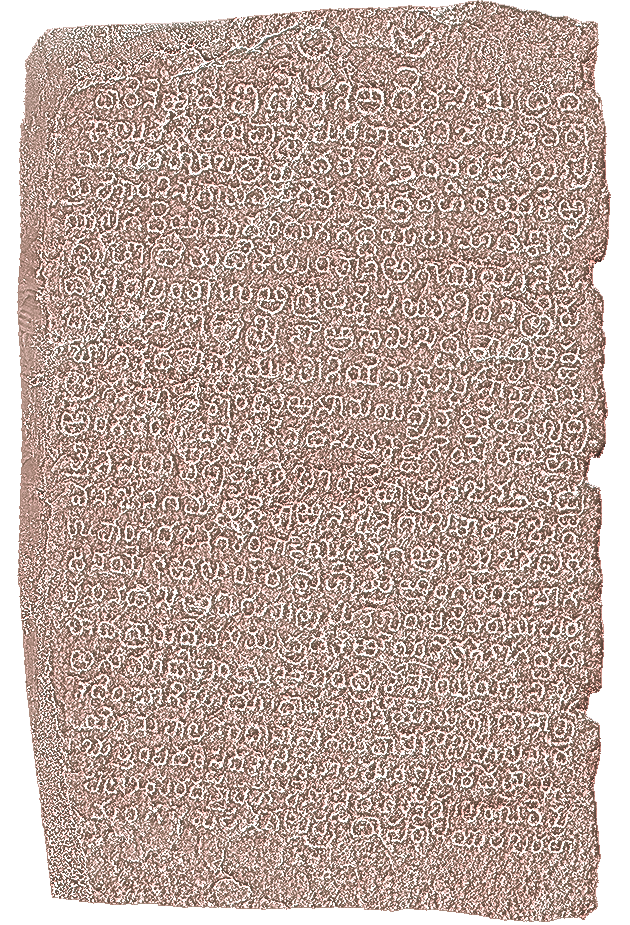
- Digital Image of the Kodigehalli 1431CE Inscription of Prathaparaya's Donation to God Someyadeva - Back Side
- Material: Stone
- Height: 140 cm (55 in)
- Width: 85 cm (33 in)
- Writing: Kannada
- Created: 9 August 1431 (594 years ago)
- Discovered: 1902
- Discovered by: B L Rice
- Present location: 13.063111°N 77.574317°E

This 15th-century Kannada inscription is the earliest known from the Bengaluru region to reference a specific astronomical event. It records a donation made by Prataparaya, son of Mangappa Dandanayaka, by order of Devaraya, the king of the Karnataka Empire (Vijayanagara Empire), during a solar eclipse. The donation was designated for the Someyadeva temple located in Sakanasamudra.

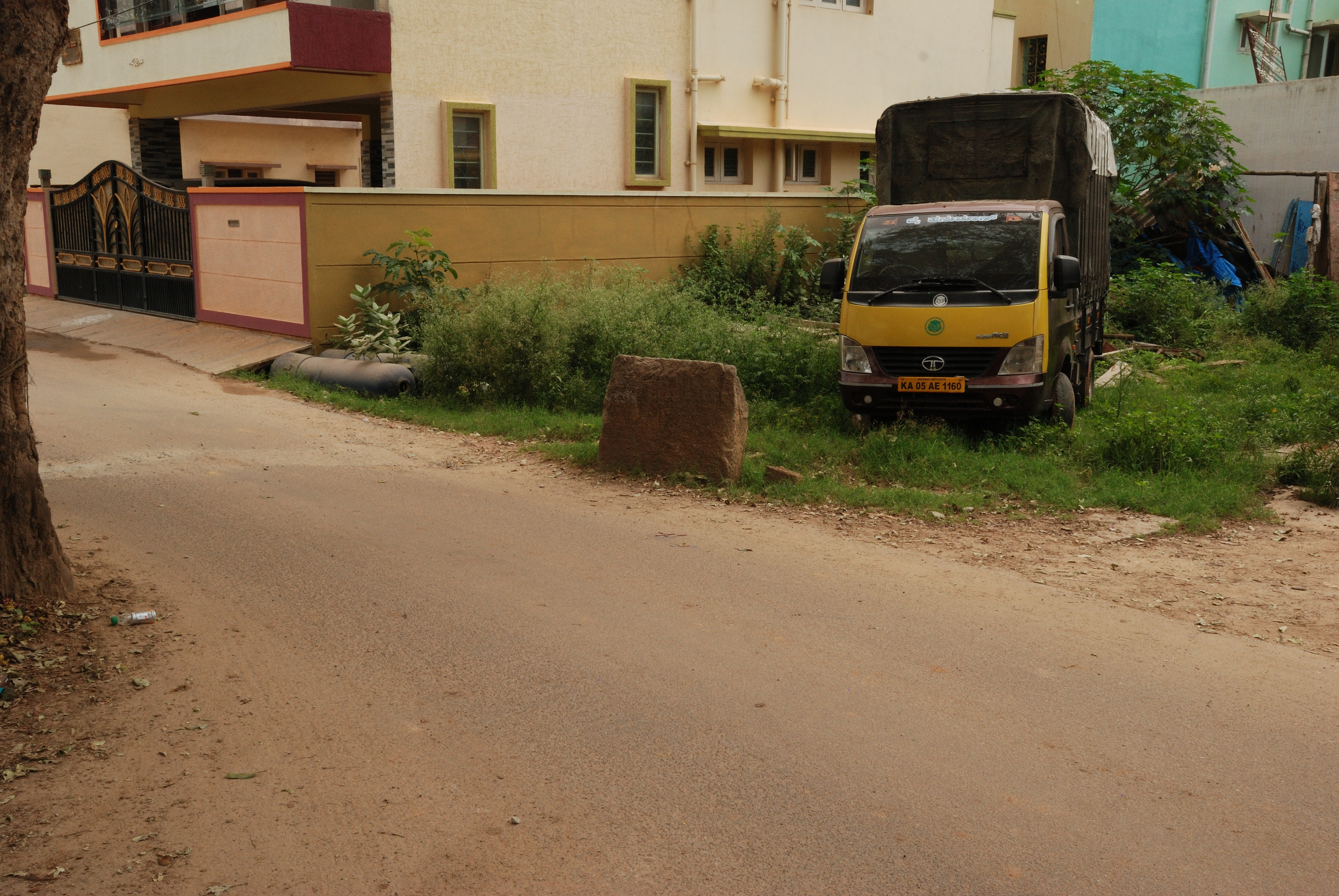
The inscription (front right) on the roadside prior its shift to a safer location in 2018

The grant included the village of Virupakshapura in Devasamudra and an income of 20 gadyana (a gold currency unit of the Vijayanagara Empire). Additionally, five khandugas (a unit of land measurement) of wetlands situated south of the Devasamudra lake were granted to the temple. This land was intended to support daily rituals and entertainment (anga-ranga vaibhoga) for the deity, including food offerings (naivedya), dance, and other performances. A team of seven individuals was specified for these performances: two actors, one dancer, one drummer, one sitar player, one upanga player (a type of musical instrument), and one kamsale dancer (a specific folk dance form). The donation was made explicitly for the well-being of King Devaraya.

The inscription employs symbols for fractions and records donation quantities in both numerals and words. The name Kodigehalli is understood to derive from this land grant (kodige). The text mentions several locations that can be tentatively mapped to modern places: Vijayanagara (Hampi), Shivanasamudra (near Hessarghatta), Yelahanka, Devasamudra (area around MS Ramaiah hospital & RMV 2nd Phase), Virupakshapura (Kodigehalli), Vijaya Devarayapura (a new name given to Virupakshapura within the inscription), and Devasamudra Hiriyakere ('Big Lake' of Devasamudra, now part of RMV Phase II). A children's story inspired by this historical record has been published in the Kannada magazine Mayura.

The inscription uses terms like Shivanasamudra and Devasamudra. The suffix "-samudra" (meaning 'ocean' in Sanskrit) was often used hyperbolically during the Vijayanagara period (roughly 14th to 17th centuries) to refer to large lakes or reservoirs, often associated with newly established settlements or agrahara grants. The term "Sandra," common in village and lake names from this era, likely derives from this usage.

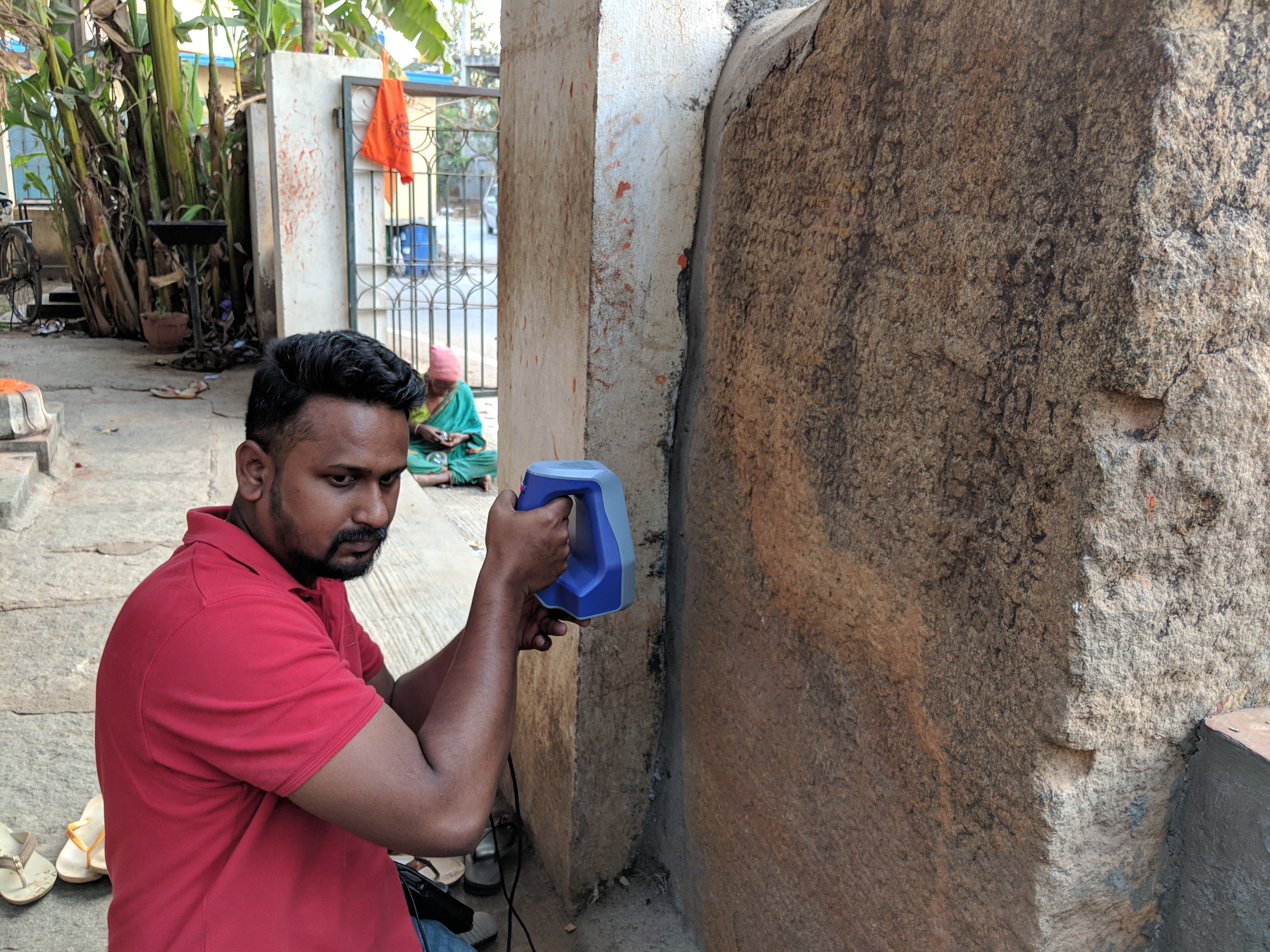
3D Scanning of the Kodigehalli 1431CE Inscription of Prathaparaya's Donation to God Someyadeva

=== Discovery and Dating ===
The inscription was documented by B.L. Rice in Epigraphia Carnatica. For conservation purposes, it was relocated to the Halekote Anjaneya temple premises in 2018. The Mythic Society has created a 3D scan of the inscription for digital preservation. The inscription is dated Shaka 1353, corresponding to 9 August 1431 CE (Julian calendar).

=== Physical Characteristics ===
The stone slab measures 140 cm in height and 85 cm in width. The Kannada script characters are approximately 2 cm tall, 3 cm wide, and inscribed to a depth of 0.13 cm. It features carved symbols of the Sun and Moon at the top, traditionally signifying the perpetual nature of the grant.

=== Transliterations of the inscription ===
Transliterations in Kannada and IAST (International Alphabet of Sanskrit Transliteration) are available in Volume 9 of Epigraphia Carnatica. A rereading and updated transliteration have also been provided by the Mythic Society.

	Kannada	IAST
Line Number	ಮುಂಭಾಗ	Front Side
1	ಶ್ರೀಗಣಾಧಿಪತಿಯೇ ನಮಃ ನಮಸ್ತುಂಗ ಸಿರಶ್ಚುಂಬ್ಯಿತ ಚಂದ್ರ	śrīgaṇādhipatiye namaḥ namastuṃga siraścuṃbyita caṃdra
2	ಚಾಮರ ಚಾರವೇ ಕು ತ್ರಯಿಲೋಕ್ಯ ನಗರಾರಂಬ ಮೂಲ	cāmara cārave ku trayilokya nagarāraṃba mūla
3	ಸ್ತಂಬಾ ಸ್ವಸ್ತಿಶ್ರೀ ಜೆಯಾಬುದಯಾ ಶಕವರುಷ ೧೩೫೩ನೆಯ	staṃbā svastiśrī jĕyābudayā śakavaruṣa 1353nĕya
4	ಸಂದು ವರ್ತ್ತಮಾನ ವಿರೋಧಿಕ್ರುತು ಸಂವತ್ಸರದ ಬಾದ್ರಪದ	saṃdu varttamāna virodhikrutu saṃvatsarada bādrapada
5	ಸು ೧ ಗುಲು ಶ್ರೀಮಂಮ್ಮಹಾರಾಜಾಧಿರಾಜ ರಾಜಪರಮೇಸ್ವರ ಶ್ರೀವೀರ	su 1 gulu śrīmaṃmmahārājādhirāja rājaparamesvara śrīvīra
6	ವಿಜಯಭೂಪತಿರಾಯ ಮಹಾರಾಯರ ಕುಮಾರರು ದೇವರಾಯ ಮ	vijayabhūpatirāya mahārāyara kumāraru devarāya ma
7	ಹಾರಾಯರು ವಿಜೆಯನಗರಿಯ ಸಿಂಹ್ವಾಸನದಲು ಸುಕಸಂಕಾ	hārāyaru vijĕyanagariya siṃhvāsanadalu sukasaṃkā
8	ತ ವಿನೋದದಿಂದ ಪ್ರಿತಿವಿರಾಜ್ಯಂಗೆಯಿಉತ್ತಯಿಹಲ್ಲಿ ಅ ದೇವರಾಯ	ta vinodadiṃda pritivirājyaṃgĕyiuttayihalli a devarāya
9	ಮಹಾರಾಯರ ಸಂಮುಕದ ನಿರೂಪದಿಂದ ಸಕನಸಮುದ್ರ	mahārāyara saṃmukada nirūpadiṃda sakanasamudra
10	ದ ವೊಳಗಣ ಊರಮುಂದಣ ಸೋಮಯದೇವರ ನಯಿವೇದ್ಯ ಅಂ	da vŏl̤ag̤ aṇa ūramuṃdaṇa somayadevara nayivedya aṃ
11	ಗರಂಗಬೋಗಕ್ಕೆ ಶ್ರೀಮಂಮಹಾಪ್ರಧಾನ ಮಂಗಪದಂಣಾಯ	garaṃgabogakkĕ śrīmaṃmahāpradhāna maṃgapadaṃṇāya
12	ಕ್ಕರ ಮಕ್ಕಳು ಪ್ರಥಾಪರಾಯರು ಕೊಟ್ಟ ಧರ್ಮಸಾಸನ ಅ ಸೋಮಯ	kkara makkal̤u pr ̤ athāparāyaru kŏṭṭa dharmasāsana a somaya
13	ದೇವರ ನಯಿವೇದ್ಯ ಅಂಗರಂಗಬೋಗಕ್ಕೆ ಮಾಡಿದ ಕಟ್ಟಳೆ ನಂ	devara nayivedya aṃgaraṃgabogakkĕ māḍida kaṭṭal̤ĕ naṃ
14	ಮ ನಾಯಕ್ಕತನಕೆ ಕೊಟ್ಟಿಹ ಸಿವನಸಮುದ್ರದ ಕೆಳಗೆ ಸಲು	ma nāyakkatanakĕ kŏṭṭiha sivanasamudrada kĕl̤ag̤ ĕ salu
15	ವ ಯೆಲಹಕ್ಕನಾಡಲ್ಲಿ ತರಣಿಯಪ್ಪನ ಬಾಗಿಯ ವೊಳಗಣ ದೇವಸ	va yĕlahakkanāḍalli taraṇiyappana bāgiya vŏl̤ag̤ aṇa devasa
16	ಮುದ್ರದ ಗ್ರಾಮದ ಕಾಲುವಳಿ ವಿರುಪಾಕ್ಷಪುರದ ಗ್ರಾಮಕಂ	mudrada grāmada kāluval̤i virupāk ̤ ṣapurada grāmakaṃ
17	ಪ್ರಾಕು ಗುತ್ತಿಗೆಯ ಪ್ರಮಾಣ ಕಾಣಿಕೆ ಸಹಹುಟ್ಟವಳಿ ಗ೧೬|| .	prāku guttigĕya pramāṇa kāṇikĕ sahahuṭṭaval̤i ̤ ga16||
18	ಗ್ರಾಮಕ್ಕೆ ಅಂದಿನ ಅದಾಯ ಅಪುರ್ವ್ವ ಅದಾಯಕಾಗಿ .	grāmakkĕ aṃdina adāya apurvva adāyakāgi .
19	ಟ್ಟಕೊಟ್ಟದು ಗ೩|| ಉಭಯಂ ವರಹ ಗ೨೦ ವರಹ ಯಿಪ್ಪತ್ತು	ṭṭakŏṭṭadu ga3|| ubhayaṃ varaha ga20 varaha yippattu
20	ಹೊಂನಿನ ಗ್ರಾಮವಾಗಿ ಯಿರಲಾಗಿ ಅ ಗ್ರಾಮವನು ವಿಜೆಯದೇ	hŏṃnina grāmavāgi yiralāgi a grāmavanu vijĕyade
21	ವರಾಯಪುರವೆಂಬ ಗ್ರಾಮವನು ಮಾಡಿ ಅ ದೇವರಾಯಪು	varāyapuravĕṃba grāmavanu māḍi a devarāyapu
22	ರವೆಂಬ ಗ್ರಾಮವನು ದೇವಸಮುದ್ರದ ಹಿರಿಯಕೆಱೆಯ ಕೆ	ravĕṃba grāmavanu devasamudrada hiriyakĕṟĕya kĕ
23	ಳಗೆ ಬೀಜವರಿಯ ಗದ್ದೆ ಖ೫ ಬೀಜವರಿಯ ಗದ್ದೆ ಅಯಿ	ḷagĕ bījavariya gaddĕ kha5 bījavariya gaddĕ ayi
24	ಗಂಡುಗವನು ಸ್ರಾವಣ ಬ೩೦ ಸೂರಿಯ ಪರಾಕ ಪುಂಣ್ಯಕಾ	gaṃḍugavanu srāvaṇa ba30 sūriya parāka puṃṇyakā
25	ಲದಲು ಅ ದೇವರಾಯ ಮಹಾರಾಯರಿಗೆ ಅಯಿರಾರೋಗ್ಯ ಅ	ladalu a devarāya mahārāyarigĕ ayirārogya a
26	ಯಿಸ್ವರಿಯ ವ್ರಿದ್ಧಿ ಅಹಂತಾಗಿ ಶ್ರೀಪರಮೇಸ್ವರ ಪ್ರೀತಿಯಾಗಿ	yisvariya vriddhi ahaṃtāgi śrīparamesvara prītiyāgi
	ಹಿಂಬಾಗ	Backside
27	ಧಾರೆನೆಱದು ಕೊಟ್ಟೆವಾಗಿ ಅ ದೇವಸಮುದ್ರದ	dhārĕnĕṟadu kŏṭṭĕvāgi a devasamudrada
28	ಕಾಲುವಳಿ ವಿರುಪಾಕ್ಷಪುರವಾದ ವಿಜೆಯದೇವರಾ	kāluval̤i virupāk ̤ ṣapuravāda vijĕyadevarā
29	ಯಪುರವೆಂಬ ಗ್ರಾಮದರೇಕೆ ಗ೨೦ ವರಹಯಿಪ್ಪ	yapuravĕṃba grāmadarekĕ ga20 varahayippa
30	ತ್ತು ಹೊಂನಿನ ಗ್ರಾಮವನು ದೇವಸಮುದ್ರದ ಹಿರಿಯಕೆಱ್ಯ	ttu hŏṃnina grāmavanu devasamudrada hiriyakĕṟya
31	ಯಲ್ಲಿ ಗದ್ದೆ ಅಯಿಗಂಡುಗ ಗದ್ದೆಯಲು ಮಾಡಿಕೊಂ	yalli gaddĕ ayigaṃḍuga gaddĕyalu māḍikŏṃ
32	ಡು ತೋಟ ತುಡಿಕೆ ಮುಂತಾಗಿ ಅಗಾಮಿಯಾಗಿ ಮಾ	ḍu toṭa tuḍikĕ muṃtāgi agāmiyāgi mā
33	ಡಿಕೊಂಬಂತಾಉ ಅ ಗ್ರಾಮಕ್ಕೆ ಸಲುವ ನಿಧಿನಿಕ್ಷೇಪ	ḍikŏṃbaṃtāu a grāmakkĕ saluva nidhinikṣepa
34	ಜಲಪಾಸಾಣ ಅಕ್ಷೀಣಿ ಅಗಾಮಿ ಸಿದ್ಧಸಾಧ್ಯ ಅಷ್ಟ	jalapāsāṇa akṣīṇi agāmi siddhasādhya aṣṭa
35	ಬೋಗ ತೇಜಸ್ವಾಮ್ಯ ಮುಂತಾಗಿ ಯೇನುಳ್ಳ ಸರ್ವಸ್ವಾಮ್ಯವನು	boga tejasvāmya muṃtāgi yenul̤l̤̤a ̤ sarvasvāmyavanu
36	ಅಗುಮಾಡಿಕೊಂಡು ಅಸೋಮಯಿದೇವರ ನಯಿವೇದ್ಯ	agumāḍikŏṃḍu asomayidevara nayivedya
37	ಅಂಗರಂಗಬೋಗಕ್ಕೆ ನಡಸುವ ಕಟ್ಟಳೆ ಯೆರಡು ಹೊ	aṃgaraṃgabogakkĕ naḍasuva kaṭṭal̤ĕ ̤ yĕraḍu hŏ
38	ತ್ತಿನ ನಯಿವೇದ್ಯ ಪಾತ್ರಬೋಗಕ್ಕೆ ಪಾತ್ರದ ಜನ೨ ನಟ್ಟ	ttina nayivedya pātrabogakkĕ pātrada jana2 naṭṭa
39	ವನ ಜನ೧ ಮದ್ದಳೆಕಾಱನ ಜನ೧ ಸಿತಾರನ ಜನ೧	vana jana1 maddal̤ĕk̤ āṟana jana1 sitārana jana1
40	ಉಪಾಂಗದ ಜನ೧ ಕಂಸಾಳೆಯ ಜನ೧ ಅಂತ್ತು ಜನಏಳು	upāṃgada jana1 kaṃsāl̤ĕ̤ya jana1 aṃttu janael̤u
41	ಜನ ಯೇಳಱಲು ಯೆರಡುಹೊತ್ತು ಅಂಗರಂಗಬೋಗ	jana yel̤aṟ̤alu yĕraḍuhŏttu aṃgaraṃgaboga
42	ವನು ನಡಸಿ ಅ ವಿರುಪಾಕ್ಷಪುರವೆಂಬ ದೇವರಾಯಪುರ	vanu naḍasi a virupākṣapuravĕṃba devarāyapura
43	ವಾದ ಗ್ರಾಮ ದೇವಸಮುದ್ರದ ಕೆಱೆಯ ಕೆಳಗಣ ಗದ್ದೆಯ	vāda grāma devasamudrada kĕṟĕya kĕl̤ag̤ aṇa gaddĕya
44	ಅಗುಮಾಡಿಕೊಂಡು ಅ ಚಂದ್ರರ್ಕ್ಕಸ್ತಾಯಿಯಾಗಿ ಸು	agumāḍikŏṃḍu a caṃdrarkkastāyiyāgi su
45	ಕದಿಂ ಬೋಗಿಸುವದು|| ದಾನಪಾಲನಯೋರ್ಮ್ಮದ್ಯದಾನಾತ್ರೇ	kadiṃ bogisuvadu|| dānapālanayormmadyadānātre
46	ಯೋನುಪಾಲನಂ| ದಾನಾಸ್ವಾರ್ಗಮವಾಪ್ನೋಪಿ ಪಾಲನಾದ	yonupālanaṃ| dānāsvārgamavāpnopi pālanāda
47	ಚುತ್ತಂ ಪದಂ|| ಸ್ವದತ್ತಾ ದ್ವಿಗುಣಂ ಪುಂಣ್ಯ ಪರದತ್ತಾನು	cuttaṃ padaṃ|| svadattā dviguṇaṃ puṃṇya paradattānu
48	ಪಲಾನಂ ಪರದತ್ತಾಪಹಾರೇಣ ಸ್ವದತ್ತಂ ನಿಶ್ಪಲಂಬವೇತು	palānaṃ paradattāpahāreṇa svadattaṃ niśpalaṃbavetu
49	ಮಂಗಳ ಮಹಶ್ರೀ ಅ ಪ್ರಥಾಪರಾಯರ ಬರಹ	maṃgal̤a mahaśrī ̤ a prathāparāyara baraha

=== Translation of the inscription ===
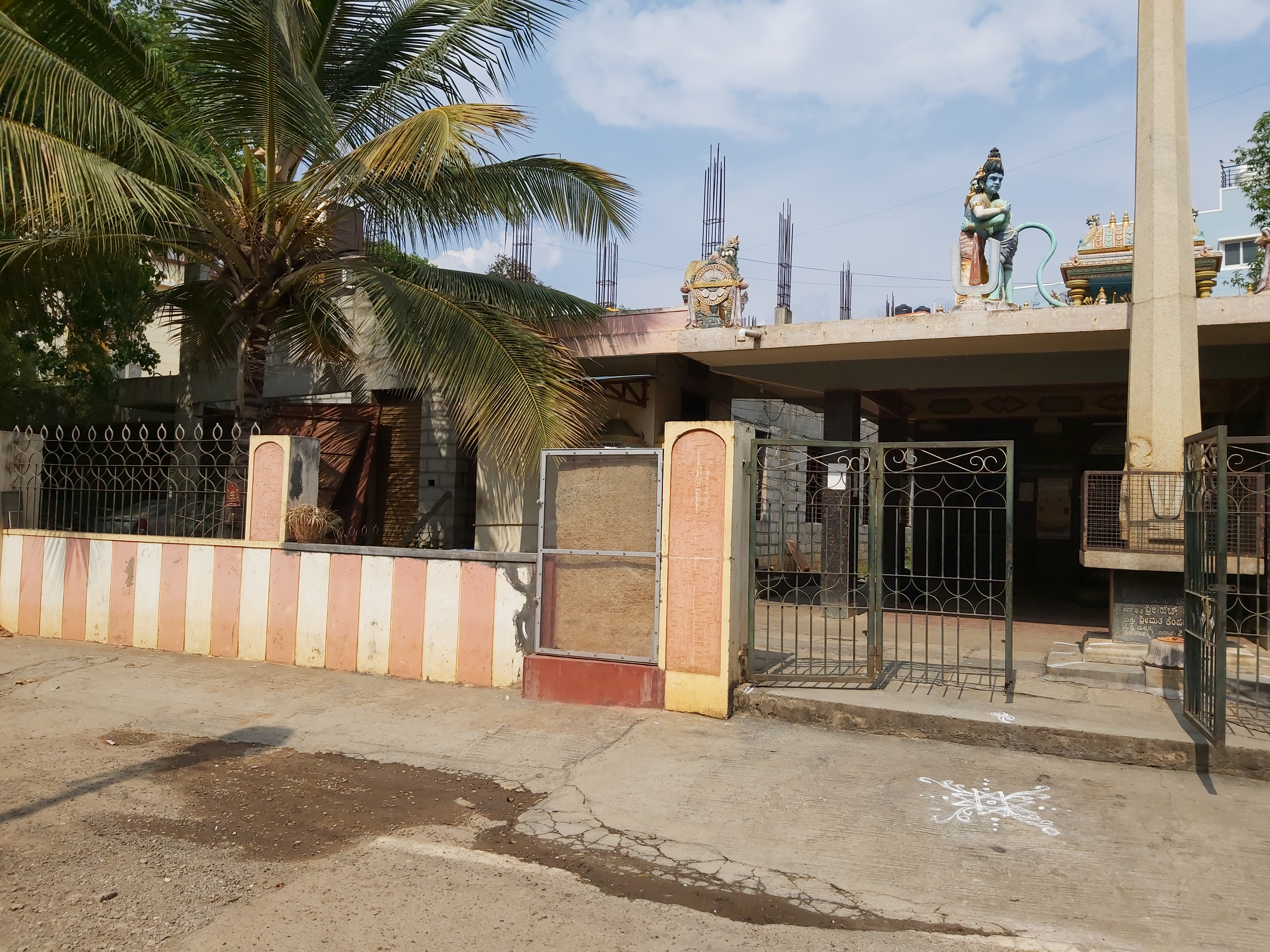
Wide Angle View Photograph of the Kodigehalli 1431CE Inscription of Prathaparaya's Donation to God Someyadeva

The English translation, published in Epigraphia Carnatica Volume 9, details the grant made by Prataparaya for the offerings (naivedya) and decorations (anga-ranga-vaibhoga) of the god Someyadeva. It specifies the income sources, the rituals to be performed, and the seven performers employed for the temple services. It states the following,

"Obeisance to Ganadhipati. Obeisance to Shambhu.e it well. (On the date specified), when śrīmanmahārājādhirāja rājaparamesvara śrīvīra vijayabhūpatirāya mahārāyara's son devarāya mahārāyara, was ruling on the throne of Vijayanagara, was ruling the kingdom of the world in peace and wisdom, by the personal order of that Devaraya maharaya — for the offerings and decorations of (the god) Someyadeva in front of the town in Sakanasamudra, the great minister Mangappa-dannayaka's son Pratapa-Raya granted a dharma sasana as follows, for the offerings and decorations of the god Someyadeva we haeve granted the Virupakshapura village, whose rental is 20 honnu, a hamlet of Devasamudra in the Yelahanka-nad, belonging to and under Sivanasamudra granted for our office of Nayaka, — making it Vijayadevarayapura, and with that Devarayapura, land (specified) under the old tank of Devasamudra, — at the time of the eclipse of the sun, in order that long life, health and increase of wealth may be to Devaraya maharaya, and from love to Pararamesvara. Details of the rental, of the ceremonies to be performed and of the seven persons to be employed to minister to the god. Usual final verses. Written by Prataparaya."

=== Astronomical Importance of the Inscription ===
This inscription is one of only two known historical records explicitly mentioning an eclipse in the Bengaluru region from that period, demonstrating the application of astronomical observations in 15th-century CE Vijayanagara society. Its reference to a solar eclipse occurring on 9 August 1431 CE (Julian) is corroborated by modern astronomical calculations, such as those found in NASA's eclipse catalog.

== Herostones of Kodigehalli ==
Two hero stones (Viragal), estimated to date from the 15th and 16th centuries CE, are located within Kodigehalli. One is housed in the Halekote Marammadevi temple complex, and the other is at the Sri Rama Mandira. These stones typically commemorate individuals, often warriors, who died in battles or skirmishes. The Kodigehalli examples feature relief sculptures depicting heroic scenes but do not bear any inscriptions to identify the individuals or events commemorated.

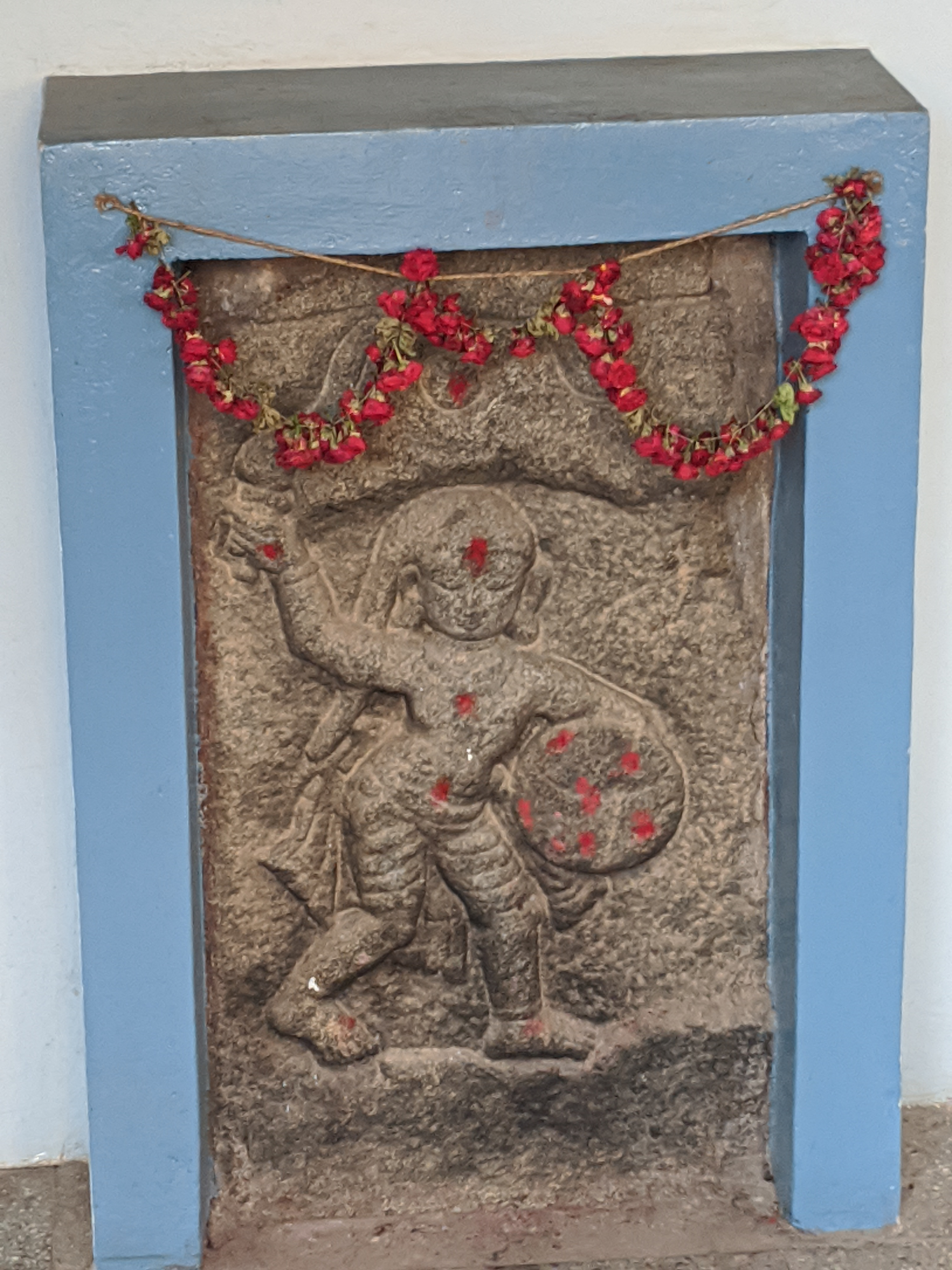
A 15-16th Century Skirmish Herostone

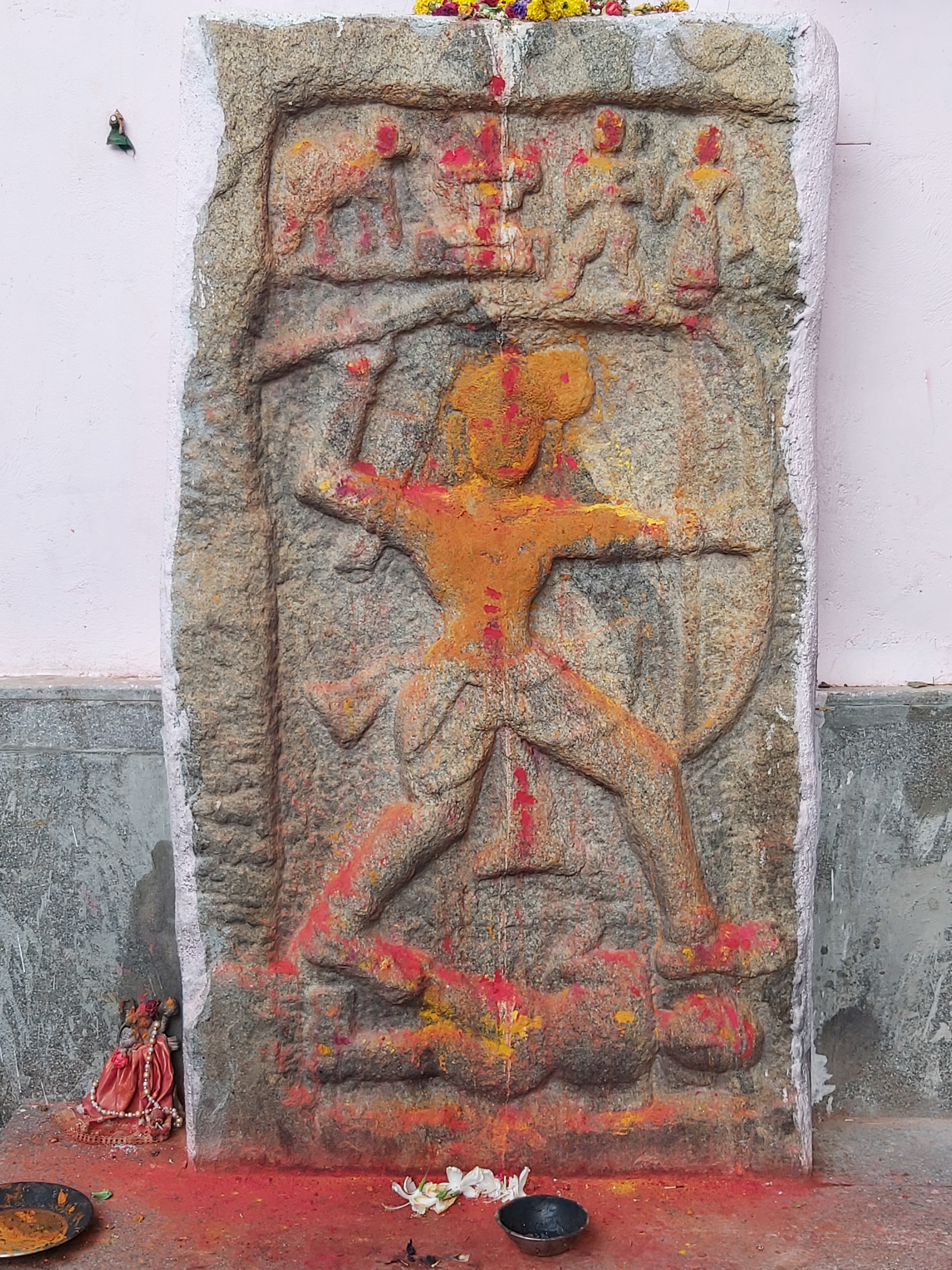
A 14-15th Century Veeramasti Memorial Stone

== Tindlu inscription (1368 CE): Donation by Merchant Guilds ==
Tindlu 1368CE Donation Inscription
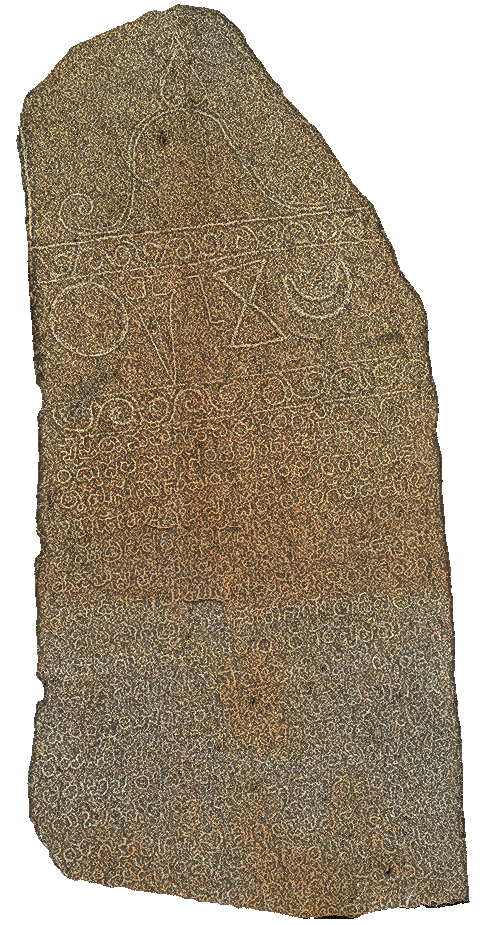
- Digital Image of the Tindlu 1368CE Donation Inscription
- Material: Stone
- Height: 226 cm (89 in)
- Width: 101 cm (40 in)
- Writing: Kannada
- Created: 15 January 1368 (658 years ago)
- Discovered: 1902
- Discovered by: B L Rice
- Present location: 13.072000°N 77.566944°E
- Language: Kannada
- https://mythicsociety.github.io/AksharaBhandara/#/learn/Shasanagalu?id=115055

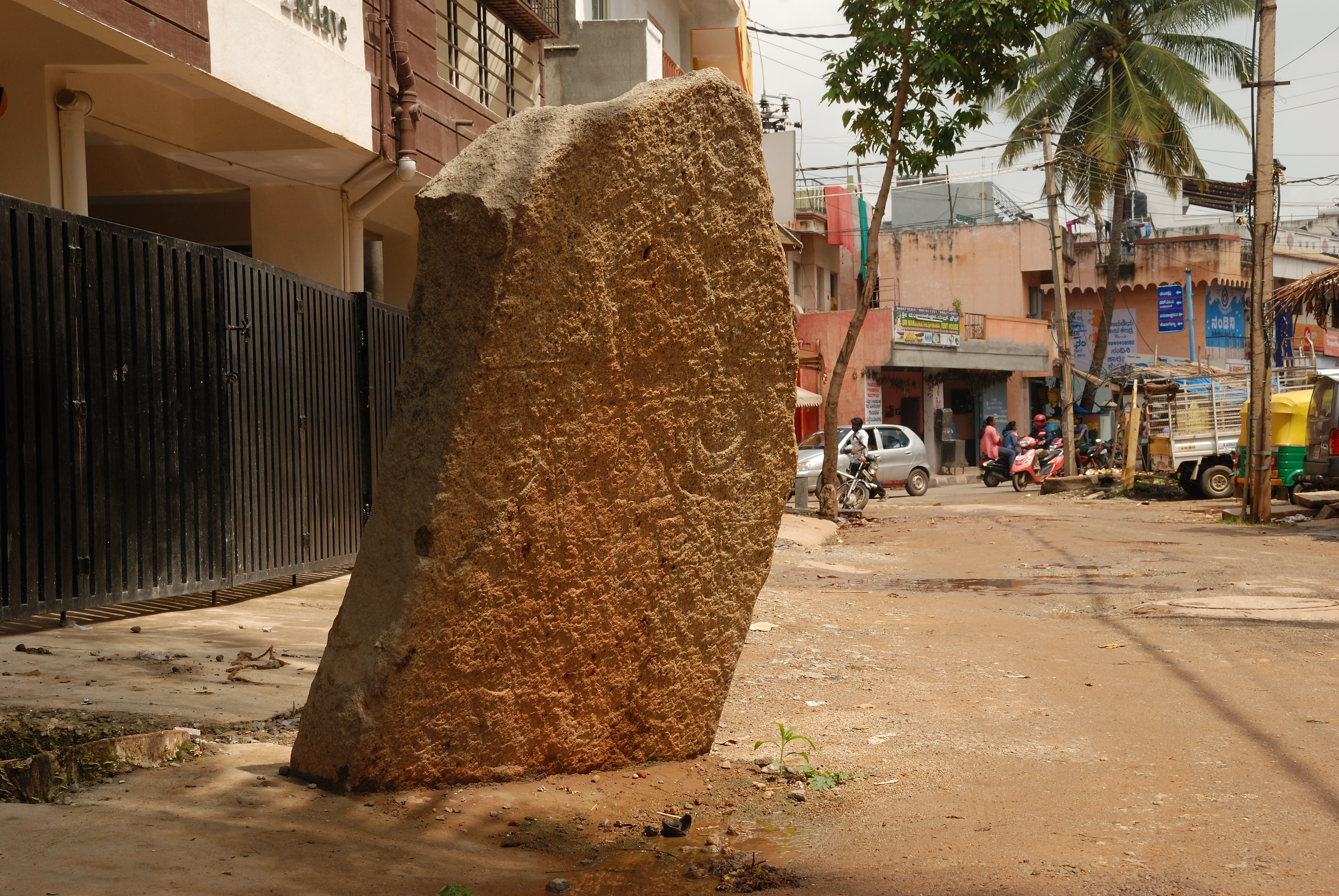
Tindlu 1368CE Donation Inscription

This Kannada inscription, found in Tindlu, is dated Shaka 1289, corresponding to 15 January 1368 CE (Julian calendar). It records a donation made by trader communities, specifically mentioning the Ubhayananadesis and Salumule (prominent medieval South Indian merchant guilds), during the reign of King Bukka I of the Vijayanagara Empire (referred to as the Karnataka Empire in the inscription). Unfortunately, the stone surface is significantly worn (effaced), making the specific details of the donation unclear. The inscription was first documented in Epigraphia Carnatica Volume 9 and is currently located at the Veerabhadraswamy Temple in Tindlu.

=== Physical Characteristics ===
The inscription slab stands 226 cm tall and 101 cm wide. The Kannada characters are relatively large, measuring approximately 5 cm in height, 4 cm in width, and inscribed to a depth of 0.18 cm.

=== Transliterations of the Inscription ===
Transliterations in Kannada and IAST are available in Volume 9 of Epigraphia Carnatica, alongside a rereading by the Mythic Society.

Line Number	Kannada	IAST
1	ಸ್ವಸ್ತಿ ಶ್ರೀ ಮತು ಶಕವರುಸಂಗಳು ೧೨೮೯ ಸ	svasti śrī matu śakavarusaṃgal̤u 1289 sa
2	ಂದು ಪಲವಂಗ ಸಂವತ್ಸರ ಪುಷ್ಯ ಬ ೧೦ ಸೋದಲು	ṃdu palavaṃga saṃvatsara puṣya ba 10 sodalu
3	ಶ್ರೀಮನುಮಹಾಮಂಡಳೇಸ್ವರ ಅರಿರಾಯ ವಿ	śrīmanumahāmaṃḍal̤esvara arirāya vi
4	ಭಾಡ ಭಾಷೆಗೆ ತಪ್ಪುವರಾಯರ ಗಂಡ ಪೂರ್ಬ್ಬ	bhāḍa bhāṣĕgĕ tappuvarāyara gaṃḍa pūrbba
5	ಸಮುದ್ರಾಧಿಪತಿ ಶ್ರೀವೀರಬುಕ್ಕಂಣ . . . .	samudrādhipati śrīvīrabukkaṃṇa . . . .
6	ಯದಲು ಸ್ವಸ್ತಿ ಸಮಸ್ತ . . . . . . . . . . ಉಭಯ	yadalu svasti samasta . . . . . . . . . . ubhaya
7	ನಾನಾದೇಸಿ ಸಾಲುಮೂಲೆ ಸ . . . . ಹಲರೂ . . .	nānādesi sālumūlĕ sa . . . . halarū . . .
8	ದ ಹಿಲವಾಗಿ . . . . . . ಸಾವಂತಾಧಿಪತಿ . .	da hilavāgi . . . . . . sāvaṃtādhipati . .
9	. . . . . . .ರು . ಯರಗರವು . . . . .	. . . . . . .ru . yaragaravu . . . . .
10	ನ ಮಕಳು ಸಿಂಗಯನಾಯಕ ತ್ತಿ . ವ ರು . . . .	na makal̤u siṃgayanāyaka tti . va ru . . . .
11	ದ . . ಯ ಸ . . ಯ ವಿ . . . ಹ ಬಿ . .	da . . ya sa . . ya vi . . . ha bi . .
12	ಕಾಯ . . . . . .. . . . .. .	kāya . . . . . .. . . . .. .
13	ಅರ . . ರ . . . . . .. . . .	ara . . ra . . . . . .. . . .
14	ಯ . . . . . . . . . . . . .	ya . . . . . . . . . . . . .
15	ಮಗ . . . . ಬ . .. . .. .. . .	maga . . . . ba . .. . .. .. . .
16	. . . . . . . . . . .. . . . . .	. . . . . . . . . . . . . . . . . . .
	(ಮುಂದೆ ಸಾಲುಗಳು ಕಾಣುವುದಿಲ್ಲ)	(Further lines are not seen)

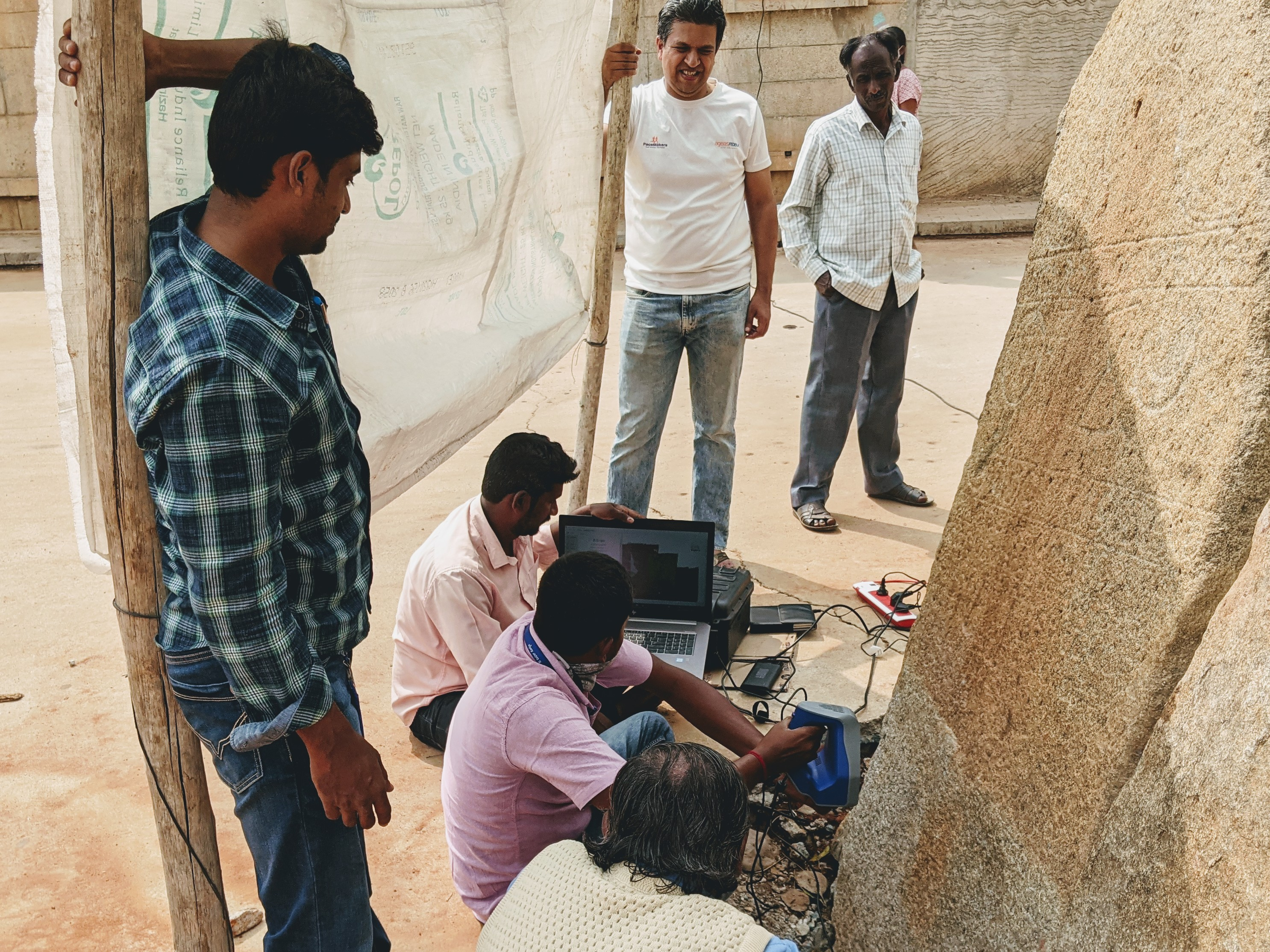
3D Scanning of the Tindlu 1368CE Donation Inscription

=== Translation ===
The translation provided in Epigraphia Carnatica Volume 9 confirms the date and the reign of King Bukka I but notes that the remainder of the text concerning the donation details is illegible due to erosion. It states the following,

"Be it well. (On the date specified), when the maha-mandalesvara, subduer of hostile kings, champion over kings who break their word, master of the four oceans, Bukkanna……(rest effaced)."

== Doddabommasandra inscription (15th century CE): Bukka-Nayaka's Grant ==
This 15th-century Kannada inscription originates from Doddabommasandra and dates to the reign of Praudha Devaraya (also known as Praudaraya) of the Vijayanagara Empire. It is a donatory inscription, although its content is incomplete. The inscription records that Bukka-Nayaka (likely a local chieftain or official) donated the village of Bommahalli, located in Kukkalanad (a historical administrative division), to an Agrahara (Brahmin settlement). The current location and condition of this inscription stone are unknown.

=== Transliterations of the Inscription ===
Transliterations in Kannada and IAST are available in Volume 9 of Epigraphia Carnatica, with a rereading by the Mythic Society.

Line Number	Kannada	IAST
1	.......	.......
2	ಮಹಾಮಂಡಳೇಶ್ವರಪವುಡ	mahamandalesvaraPrauda
3	ರಾಯ.........	raya........
4	ತಿದ್ದಲ್ಲಿಕುಕ್ಕಳನಾಡ	iddalli kukkala-nada
5	.........ಈನಾಡ	........... i-nada
6	ನಾಳುಮಬುಕ್ಕು ನಾಯ್ಕ ರುಲಿ	naluva Bukka-Naykaruli
7	ಕುಕ್ಕಳ ನಾಡನುಬಂಮ	Kukkala-nadanu Bommahaliya
8	ಹಳೆಯ............ ಸರ್ವೆ	haleya......sarve
9	ಮಾನ್ಯವಾಗಿವೊಂಮು	sarvamanyavagi vom-mu
10	ಕಾಸುಂಕಬಿಟ್ಟು ಅಗ್ರ	ka-sunka bittu agra
11	ಹಾರಕ್ಕೆ ಕೊಟ್ಟು ಯೀಧರ್ಮ	harakke kottu ee dharma
12	ಕ್ಕೆ ತಪಿದವು	kai tapidavu
13	ತಾಯಿ............	taayi......

=== Translation ===
The translation in Epigraphia Carnatica Volume 9 confirms the reign of Praudha Raya and mentions Bukka-Nayaka's grant of Bommahalli village to an Agrahara.It states the following,

"…. When the maha-mandalesvara praudha raya was ruling; the Kukkala-nad ruler Bukka-Nayaka granted Bommahalli in that nad, free of all imposts, for an agrahara, remitting the customs one way. Imprecation."

== See also ==
Agara (Bengaluru) Inscriptions

Indian Astronomy
