= Sahakara Nagar =

Sahakar Nagar
- Location within India
- Coordinates: 13.064°N 77.58°E
- Country: India
- State: Karnataka
- Metro: Bengaluru

Languages
  - Official: Kannada
- Time zone: UTC+5:30 (IST)
- PIN: 560092

Sahakar Nagar is a residential suburb in Bangalore, India. Sahakar nagar is formed by the Ministry of Communication Employees housing society and has developed to this extent under the efforts of the Sahakar nagar Residents welfare association. Ever since the inclusion of 45 new wards to Bangalore city in 2008, Sahakar Nagar comes under the BBMP (Bruhat Bengaluru Mahanagara Palike) limits. The locality is accessible via NH 7 on the East. Sahakar Nagar was formed in the early 1980s as a co-operative society for Telecom and Post & Telegraph employees of the Government of India. It has over 8 well maintained parks and two Playgrounds maintained by BBMP. Owing to its proximity to Hebbal lake, Amrutahalli lake and GKVK forest land, it is often called the Prague of Bengaluru city.

== Neighbourhood ==
Sahakar Nagar comes in parts, under both Byatarayanapura and Kodigehalli wards of the BBMP, and is flanked by Hebbala, Tata Nagar, Thindlu and Vidyaranyapura However, Sahakara Nagar is located outside the bounds of Bangalore City but is near to Kempegowda International Airport.

== See also ==
- Vidyaranyapura
- Kodigehalli
- Thindlu
- Tata Nagar
