= Vidyaranyapura =

- Location of Vidyaranyapura in Karnataka
- Coordinates: 13.076°N 77.558°E
- Country: India
- State: Karnataka
- Metro: Bangalore
- Constituency: Bangalore North
- Assembly Constituency: Byatarayanapura
- Zone: Yelahanka
- Ward: 9
- Established Period: 1974-1976

Area
  - Total: 9.9 km^{2} (3.8 sq mi)

Population (2011)
  - Total: 57,195
  - Density: 5,753/km^{2} (14,900/sq mi)

Languages
  - Official: Kannada
- Time zone: UTC+5:30 (IST)
- PIN: 560097
- Vehicle registration: KA-50

Vidyaranyapura is a residential locality situated in the northern part of Bangalore, in the state of Karnataka, India. Along with several other extensions, Vidyaranyapura falls under the Byatarayanapura constituency. It is administered by the Bruhat Bengaluru Mahanagara Palike (BBMP) under the Greater Bangalore jurisdiction.

== History ==
Vidyaranyapura was established as a residential colony in the late 1970s. Prior to its development, the area was largely agricultural land owned by a prominent landlord, who continues to maintain a large mango orchard known as Dinshaw Estate.

Local legends suggest that Vidyaranyapura and its surroundings may have once been the site of a battlefield. This belief is partly supported by the nearby locality of Dandina Kodigehalli, where "Dandu" in Kannada refers to a cantonment or military camp. The township is named in honor of Vidyaranya, the renowned Kannada poet, saint, and priest.

== Geography ==
Vidyaranyapura is located in the northwestern part of Bangalore, Karnataka, at an elevation of approximately 3,050 ft (930 m) above sea level, with coordinates 13°05′N 77°33′E. It is bordered by several localities, including Yelahanka, Thindlu, Kodigehalli, Doddabommasandra, Jalahalli, MS Palya, and Sahakara Nagar.

It is a composite locality comprising multiple sub-blocks and layouts: AMS Layout, Ganesha Layout, Balaji Layout, Defence Colony, Nanjappa Layout, Chamundeshwari Layout, Srinidhi layout, BEL Layout (Bharat Electronics), Hindustan Machine Tools (HMT) layout, and National Tuberculosis Institute NTI layout.

Vidyaranyapura is situated close to major public sector industries, including Bharat Electronics Limited (BEL) and Hindustan Machine Tools (HMT). It also lies in proximity to several prominent educational and research institutions, such as the Centre for Liquid Crystal Research, the University of Agricultural Sciences, Bangalore, the Indian Institute of Science, the National Centre for Biological Sciences, the Jawaharlal Nehru Centre for Advanced Scientific Research, and the TIFR Centre for Applicable Mathematics. These institutions are easily accessible and the area is well connected by services operated by the Bangalore Metropolitan Transport Corporation (BMTC).

To the east of Vidyaranyapura, about one kilometre from the post office, lies Thindlu, one of the oldest settlements in Bangalore. Thindlu is known for its ancient temple dedicated to Lord Virabhadra, a fierce form of Lord Shiva.

== Agriculture ==
Vidyaranyapura is west of the University of Agricultural Sciences, GKVK, and Thindlu. The area has a variety of trees and plants, which were planted by the Forest Department while converting it into a residential area. The native tree is predominantly the eucalyptus. The soil is very rich in nutrients and has a distinct red color.

== Biodiversity ==
Vidyaranyapura is notable for its rich biodiversity and extensive green spaces. The area features several lakes and is surrounded by significant greenery, with agricultural land forming a major part of the landscape. A prominent feature of the locality was a large mango grove, formerly known as the Dinshaw Estate, located at its center; a large apartment complex now occupies much of this area. The soil in Vidyaranyapura is predominantly red and has a high humus content, making it fertile and suitable for a wide variety of plant species, including many with medicinal value.

The locality also supports diverse animal life. A large population of pigeons is commonly seen, while rarer bird species in Bangalore, such as the Greater coucal, can be spotted in quieter parts of the area. Sparrows are frequently found near the Last Bus Stop. Reptiles, particularly cobras, are relatively common and often observed in groups. Narasipura Lake, located nearby, is home to turtles and mongooses. Amphibians such as the common Indian toad and the bullfrog are also present. In 2002, a pangolin was recorded in the vicinity, highlighting the area's ecological diversity.

Various bird species are known to frequent Vidyaranyapura, including the lesser whistling teal, black-headed ibis, purple swamphen, red-wattled lapwing, white-cheeked barbet, small green barbet, pied wagtail (Motacilla alba), egret, little grebe, little cormorant, purple heron, oriental darter, spotted dove, bulbul, night heron, Indian spot-billed duck, sandpiper, and whistling duck.

== Notable residents ==
- Obaid Siddiqi - scientist and Padma Vibushan awardee
- Sreesanth - former Indian cricketer, cine artiste
- Rajesh - Kannada actor and theater artist
- K Chandrasekhar - a former Indian scientist and aerospace engineer, was one of the seven accused in the 1994 Isro spy case

== See also ==
- Yelahanka
- Thindlu
- Jalahalli
- Trust Opticals, 77, 11th Cross, 2nd Main, Nanjappa LO, Vidyaranyapura, Bangalore 97
