= Kodigehalli =

Coordinates: 13.0560°N 77.5733°E

- Neighbourhood
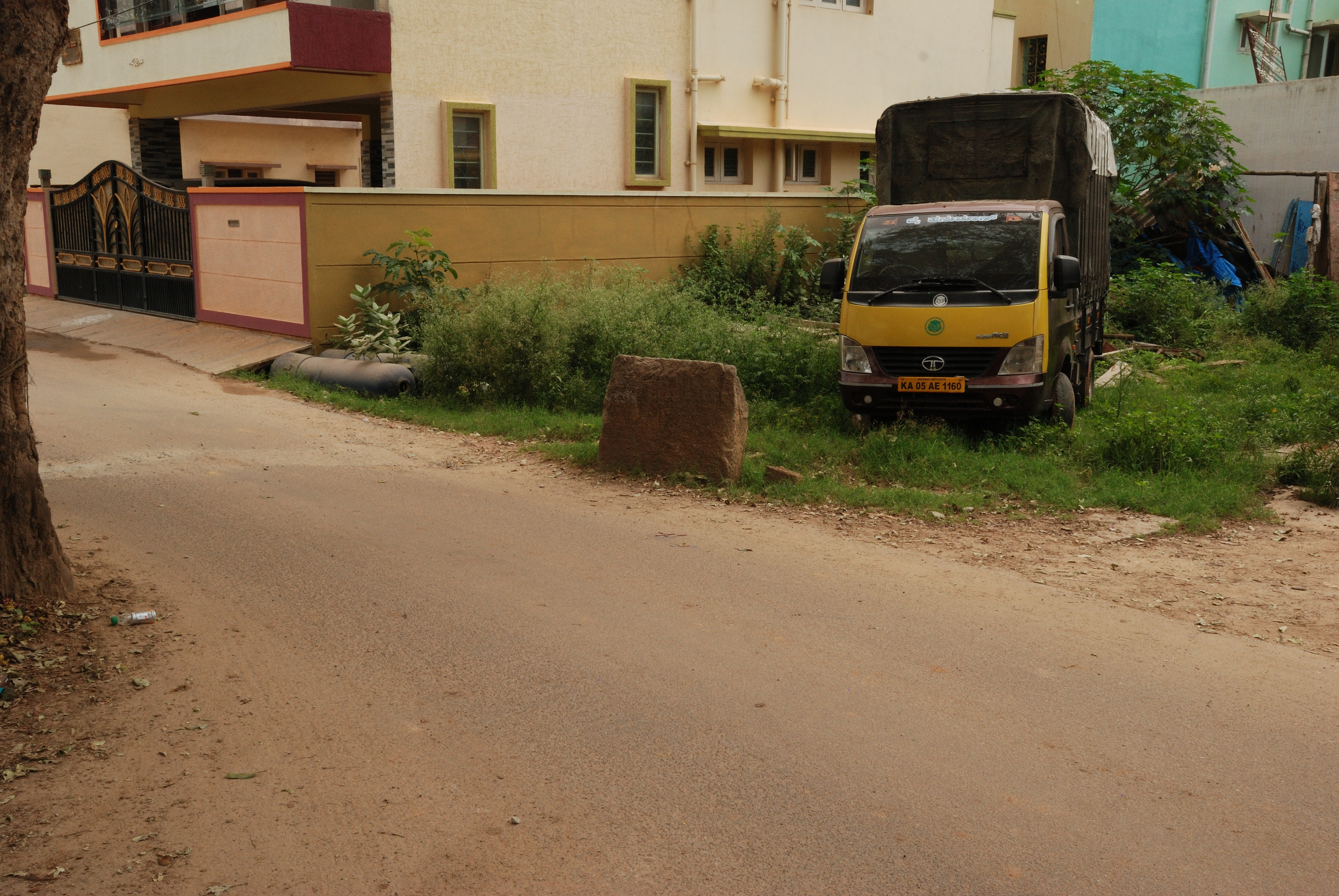
- Kodigehalli wide angle
- Interactive map of Kodigehalli
- Country: India
- State or Union Territory: Karnataka
- City: Bangalore

Kodigehalli, one of Bengaluru's oldest villages, is now included in BBMP Ward 8 under the Bruhat Bengaluru Mahanagara Palike (BBMP). A blend of history and modernity, Kodigehalli is home to ancient temples and modern infrastructure, playing a significant role in Bengaluru's rapidly developing northern corridor.

Situated south of Sahakarnagar and near Hebbal, Kodigehalli is well-connected by the New Airport Road, which links Kodigehalli Main Road via the Kodigehalli Circle. Its strategic location provides easy access to the city center and Kempegowda International Airport.

To the west of Kodigehalli Railway Station, a road leads to Thindlu, while the Kodigehalli Bus Stop is marked by the Dodda Ganapa Devasthana, a prominent Ganapathi temple. Well connected to Majestic and other central parts of Bengaluru.

To the South West lies Tatanagar, also known as the I.I.Sc Layout, a planned residential area developed by current and former employees of the Indian Institute of Science (IISc). Tatanagar is also home to the Aadhaar headquarters. South of Kodigehalli is Bhadrappa Layout, located along the Outer Ring Road.

The road connecting Kodigehalli to Tatanagar is home to two notable temples, the Omkareswara Temple and the Ganga Temple, which add to the cultural and spiritual essence of the area.

== History ==
Kodigehalli, located in the northern part of Bengaluru near Hebbal Lake, is steeped in history that reflects the evolution of the Bengaluru region from ancient to modern times. The locality holds a significant place in the narrative of the city, tracing its roots back to prehistoric and medieval eras.

=== Prehistoric Beginnings ===
The region surrounding Kodigehalli has been inhabited since prehistoric times. Archaeological discoveries in nearby areas such as Jalahalli, Siddapur, and Gavipura have revealed Stone Age tools dating from 2000 to 1000 BCE. During the Middle Stone Age (circa 4000 BCE), evidence of human habitation was found at Jalahalli, Sudasandra, Siddhapura, and Jadigenahalli, highlighting the region's role as a cradle of early human activity.

In the Iron Age (circa 1000 BCE), burial grounds were established in nearby localities, such as Koramangala and Chikkajala, further indicating the area's long-standing significance. Additionally, the discovery of Roman coins from the reigns of emperors Augustus, Tiberius, and Claudius in places like Yeshwantpur and HAL points to early trade and cultural exchanges with distant civilizations.

=== City of Boiled Beans Connection ===
Kodigehalli holds a significant place in the historical and folkloric origins of "Bengaluru", often referred to as the "City of Boiled Beans." The name "Bengaluru" is believed to derive from the Kannada term Benda-Kaal-Ooru, meaning "Town of Boiled Beans." This name is linked to a fascinating tale from the reign of the Hoysala king, Veera Ballala II.

According to legend, while on a hunting expedition, King Veera Ballala II became lost in the dense forests near what is now Kodigehalli. Separated from his retinue, the king was exhausted and on the verge of collapse due to hunger and thirst. In his search for help, he came across a humble hut. The elderly woman who lived there, noticing the king's dire condition, offered him boiled beans and water—the only provisions she had.

This simple yet profound act of kindness deeply moved the king. As a gesture of gratitude, he named the area Benda-Kaal-Ooru, or "Boiled Beans Town." Over the centuries, this name evolved into Bengaluru, the vibrant capital of Karnataka.

==== Halé Bengaluru and the Ganga Era ====
Kodigehalli is closely linked to the ancient settlement of Halé Bengaluru (Old Bangalore)., which was mentioned in inscriptions from the Western Ganga dynasty (circa 9th century CE). These records identify Halé Bengaluru as a small hamlet in the area, believed to be near modern Kodigehalli. The locality remained significant during the subsequent dynasties due to its strategic location and agricultural fertility.

Rock Inscriptions and Hero Stones

Kodigehalli is home to historically significant rock inscriptions, including hero stones that record notable celestial events such as solar eclipses. These inscriptions, etched in stone, provide insights into the region's cultural and astronomical knowledge during ancient times. The hero stones are a testament to the area's rich heritage, reflecting both valor and scientific awareness of early civilizations.

==== Connection to Kempe Gowda and the Founding of Bengaluru ====
The historical prominence of Kodigehalli grew during the 16th century when Kempe Gowda I established Bengaluru as a fortified town in 1537 CE. The name "Bengaluru" is said to have been inspired by Halé Bengaluru, as Kempe Gowda's mother and wife hailed from this village near Kodigehalli. This act intertwined the fate of Kodigehalli with the city's foundation, symbolizing its historical importance.

==== Kodigehalli as a Royal Gift ====
The name Kodigehalli itself reflects its regal past. The term Kodige translates to "gift" in Kannada, commemorating the land granted by King Veera Ballala of the Hoysala dynasty to two loyal brothers, Byregowda and Bacchegowda. The brothers were rewarded for their bravery in retrieving two of the king's prized horses that had escaped. This event not only gave the locality its name but also cemented its role as a vital area under royal patronage.

==== Cultural and Historical Evolution ====
Through the Vijayanagara period and later under Mysore rulers, Kodigehalli remained an agricultural and administrative hub. Its proximity to the Hebbal Lake, one of the oldest man-made lakes in Bengaluru, added to its significance as a fertile and resource-rich area. The lake also supported the agrarian lifestyle of the Kodigehalli community.

==== Legacy and Importance ====
Kodigehalli stands as a testament to Bengaluru's long and layered history, from the Stone Age to the modern era. Its evolution mirrors that of Bengaluru itself, making it a vital part of the city's cultural and historical heritage.

== Modern Kodigehalli ==
Today, Kodigehalli has transformed into a bustling urban area while retaining its historical roots. Located near Hebbal, it is well-connected by two major highways: Airport Road on NH 44. and central Bengaluru, and NH 75 Outer Ring Road, providing access to other parts of the city. This connectivity has made Kodigehalli a prime residential and commercial area.

The locality is close to major tech hubs like Manyata Tech Park and business districts in Hebbal and Nagavara. This has led to rapid urban growth, with modern apartments, gated communities, and shopping centers emerging in the area. New pubs, restaurants, and cafes have also come up along Bellary Road and in nearby Sahakaranagar, creating a vibrant social scene.

Kodigehalli will soon benefit from planned metro lines along Hebbal and Airport Road, as well as the suburban rail network under the KRIDE project. Despite its modernization, the area still retains green spaces and its proximity to Hebbal Lake adds to its appeal. Located just 10 km from Majestic, Kodigehalli offers a balance of urban convenience and historical charm.

== Gallery ==
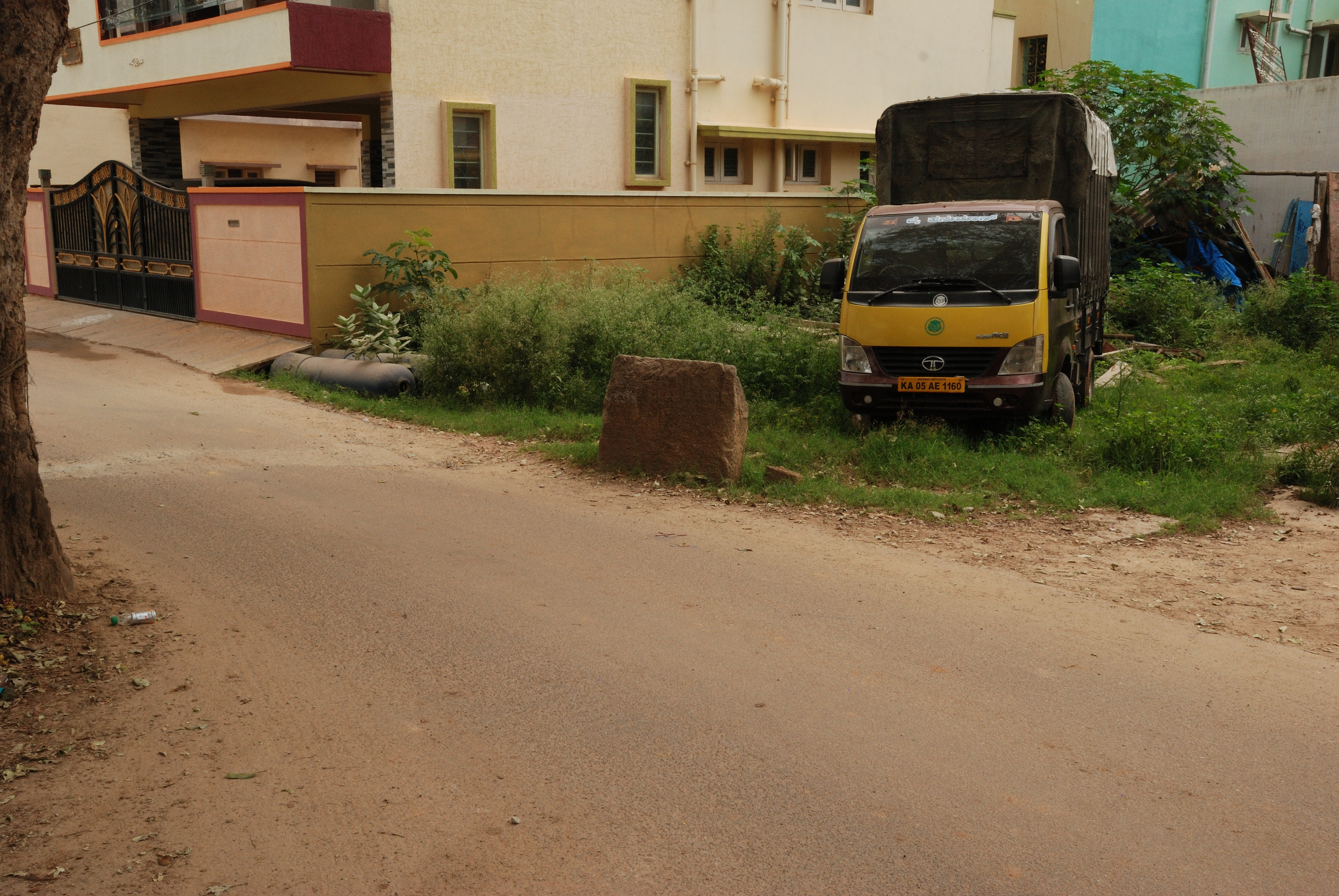
A street in Kodigehalli

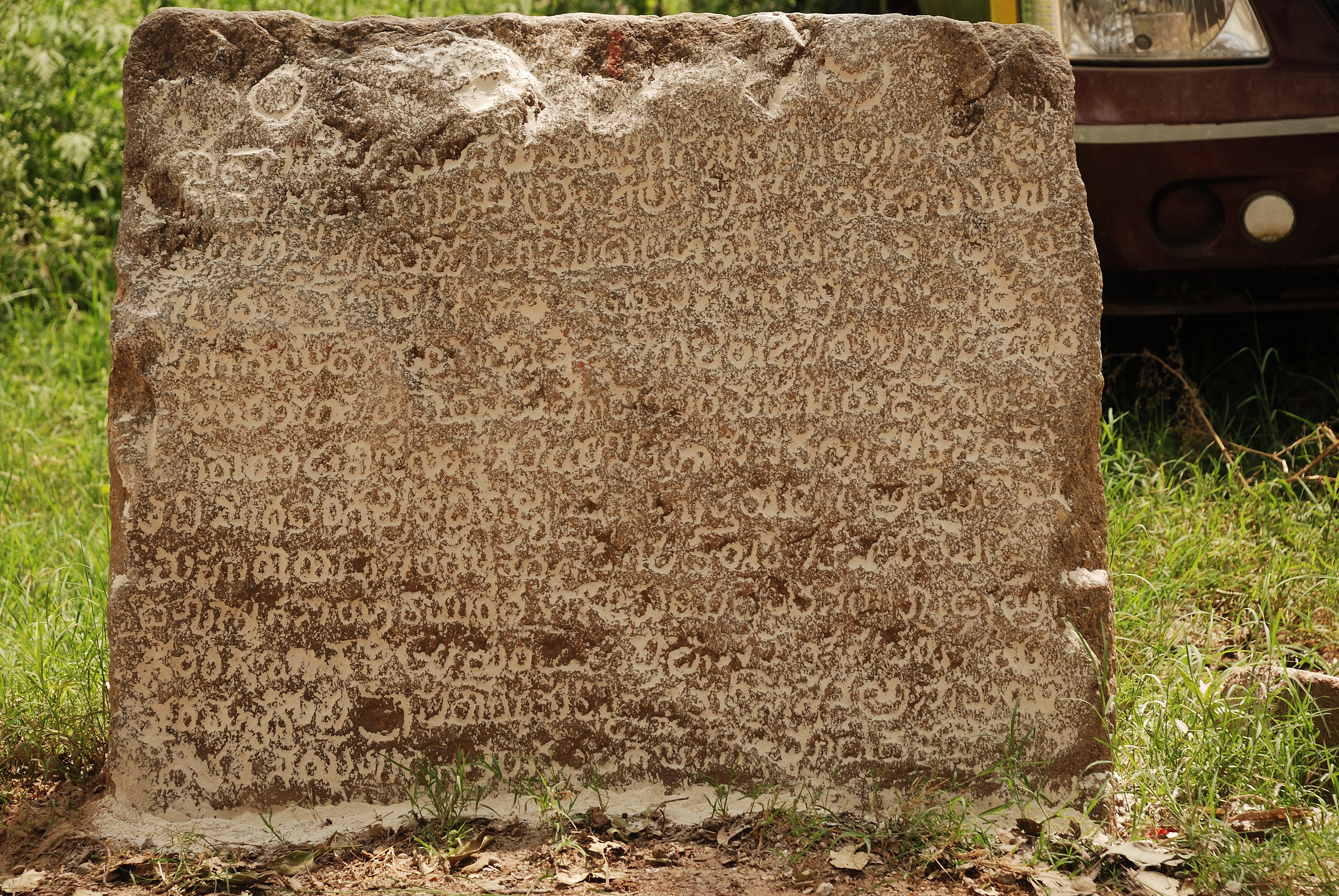
A rock inscription in Kannada

Kodigehalli Halt railway station (KDGH)

== See also ==
- Thindlu
- Vidyaranyapura
- Hebbal
- Sahakara Nagar
