= Agara inscriptions and hero stones =

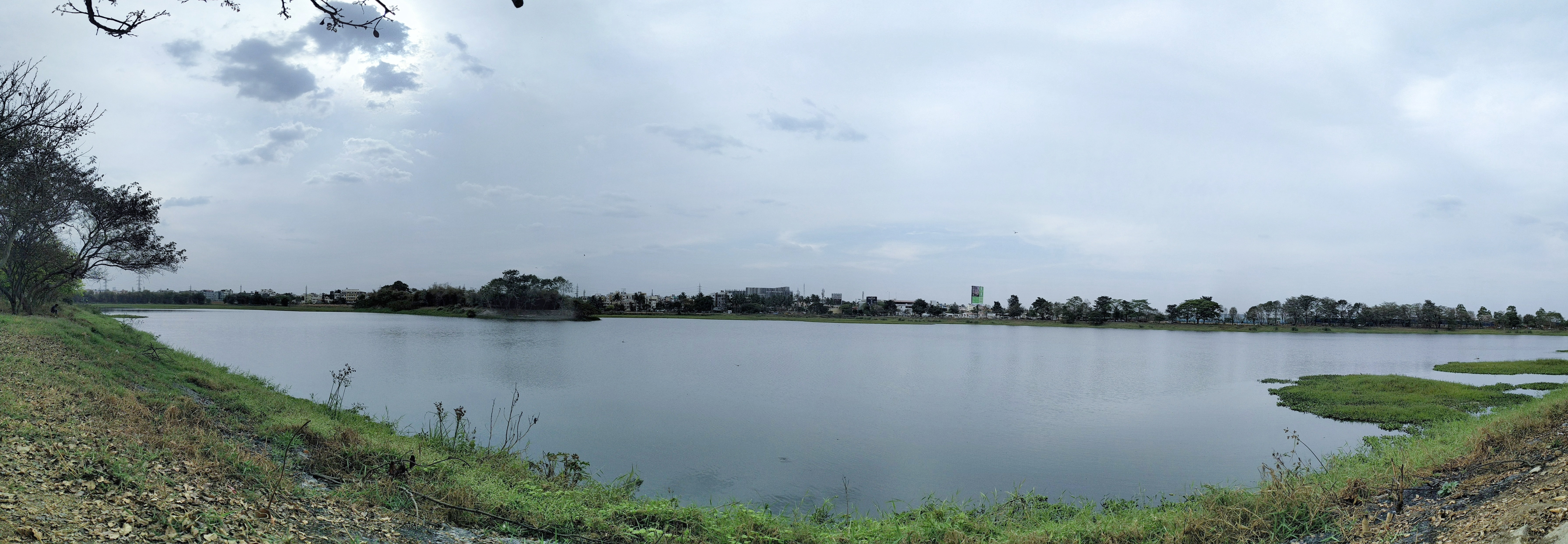
Agara Lake

The Agara inscriptions and hero stones are three passages of Kannada text inscribed on memorial stones found in or around Agara, a Panchayat-village located on the Outer Ring Road near Koramangala and HSR Layout in Bengaluru, India. More generally, hero stones are memorial stones commemorating the honourable death of a hero in battle, and are located all over India.

The Agara inscriptions date from the 9th to the 16th century CE and record donations made during the reigns of the Western Ganga dynasty and Karnataka (Vijayanagara) empire. One of them, the 9th-century Sriyamayya inscription, refers to the fixing of sluices for a tank, and although the inscription does not explicitly name the Agara Tank its documented location supports the conclusion that it does refer to the Agara Tank. As the inscription is approximately 1150–1200 years old, this makes it one of the earliest documented references to a tank in Bengaluru.

All three inscriptions and hero stones from the Agara area have been documented and published, and two are recorded in scholarly sources. However, the physical condition of two of them is unknown.

== 1. Sriyamayya inscription - 9th century CE ==
This hero stone inscription is written in the Kannada script and has been paleographically dated to the 10th century CE. It records the repair of two sluices for the Agara Tank, the construction of a new tank, and the securing of lands for its upkeep by Sriryamayya, son of Irugamayya.

The inscription was issued during the reign of Nagattara, a feudal chieftain serving under the Western Ganga ruler Satyavakya Permmadi, who ruled the region from his administrative seat at Begur. Nagattara is mentioned in about 15 inscriptions from the Bengaluru region during this period and is also credited with constructing the Begur Nageshwara Temple, the earliest documented temple in the Bengaluru region. The inscription describes Nagattara as Kaliyuga Hanumanta and praises his strength and prowess.

The inscription was first documented in Volume 9 of Epigraphia Carnatica, but its current physical condition is unknown.

=== Transliteration of the text ===
The transliteration of the inscription has been published in Volume 9 of Epigraphia Carnatica. The exact transliteration of the inscription in Kannada and IAST is as follows. (The line numbers are not part of the original inscription - including them is a default practice with inscriptions.)

| Line Number | Kannada | IAST |
|---|---|---|
| 1 | ಸ್ಯಸ್ತಿಶ್ರೀರಾಜ್ಯವಿಜಯಸಂವ | svastiśrīrajyāvijayasaṃva |
| 2 | ತ್ಸರಸತ್ಯವಾಖ್ಯಪೆಮ್ರ್ಮಡಿಯಕ | tsarasatyavākhyapremmadiyaka |
| 3 | ಲಿಯುಗದಣುವನಾಗತರನೊಳ್ | liyugadaṇuvanāgataranol |
| 4 | ಇವ್ಯುಲಿಯೂರೊಡೆಇರುಗ | ivyuliyūrodeiruga |
| 5 | ಮಯ್ಯನಮಗಂಸಿರಿಯಮ | mayyanamagaṃsiriyama |
| 6 | ಯ್ಯನೆರಡುಕೆಲಿಯಂತೂಂಬನಿ | yyaneradukeliyaṃtūmbani |
| 7 | ಕ್ಕಿಮೂಡಣಕೆಅಯಂಕಟ್ಟಿಸಿ | kkimūdaṇkeayaṃkattisi |
| 8 | ಮೂಹಿಕೆಹಿಯಬಿತ್ತುಪಟ್ಟವಂ | mūhikehiyabittupattavam |
| 9 | ಪಡೆದಂಬಿತ್ತುವಟವಂಸಲಿ | padedambittuvatavamsali |
| 10 | ಸದನುನಿಕ್ಕದುಣ್ಬನುಕವಿಲೆ | sadanunikkadunbanukavile |
| 11 | ಯನಅದಂ | yanaadam |

=== Translation ===
The text has been published in Volume 9 of Epigraphia Carnatica. It reads as follows:

"Be it well. In the victorious year of the Srirajya, under Satyavakya-Permmadi's Kali-yuga Hanuman, Nagattara, — the Iruvvuliyur odeya, Irugamayya's son Sriyamayya, fixed sluices to the two tanks, had the eastern tank built, and obtained the bittuvatta of the three tanks. Imprecation."

== 2. Agara Kamaiya Nayaka's donation inscription - 1362CE ==
Agara (Bengaluru) Inscriptions and Herostones
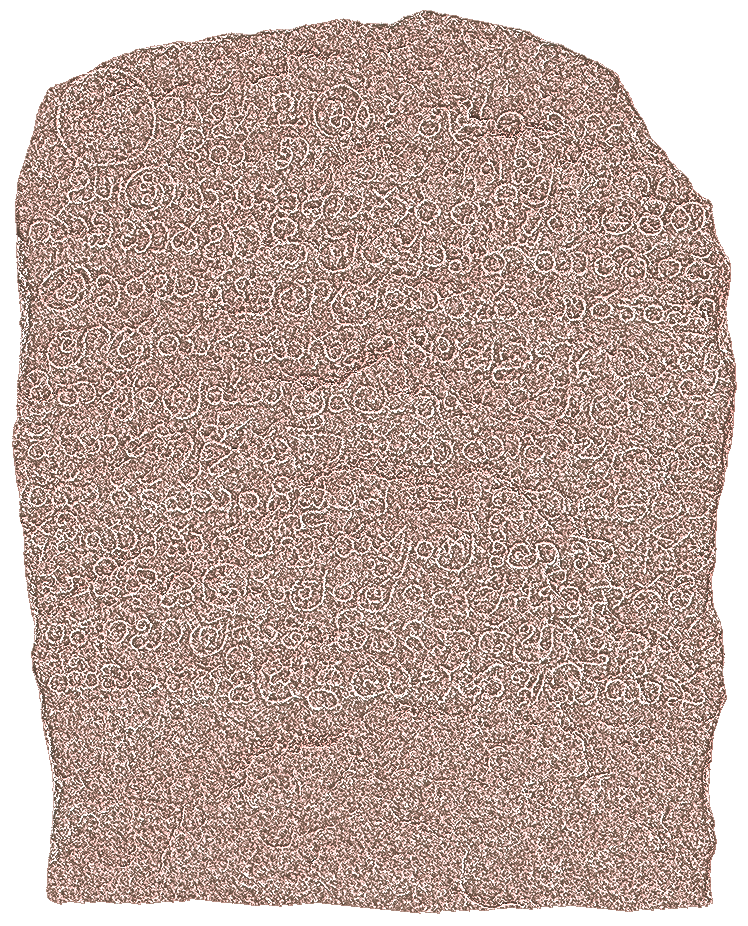
- Digital image of the front side of the Agara 1362CE Kamaiya Nayaka's Donation Inscription obtained by 3D scanning of the inscription. Picture Courtesy: Wikimedia Commons

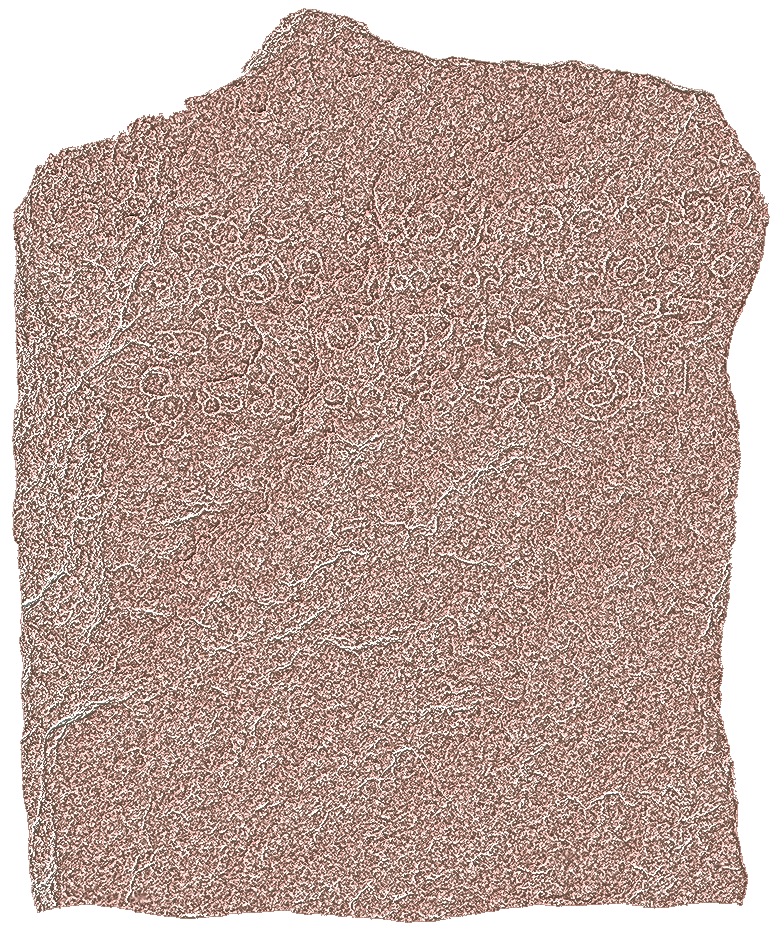
- Digital image of the back side of the Agara 1362CE Kamaiya Nayaka's Donation Inscription obtained by 3D scanning of the inscription. Picture Courtesy: Wikimedia Commons
- Material: Stone
- Height: 148 cm (58 in)
- Width: 123 cm (48 in)
- Writing: Kannada script of the time
- Created: 3 June 1362 (664 years ago)
- Discovered: 1905; Agara
- Discovered by: B L Rice and team of the Mysore Archaeological Department
- Present location: 12.974806°N 77.595889°E
- Language: Kannada language of the time
- https://mythicsociety.github.io/AksharaBhandara/#/learn/Shasanagalu?id=1011363

This hero stone inscription is written in the Kannada script and has been dated to the 14th-century CE. It is a donatory record made during the reign of Kamaiya Nayaka's father, Kampanna Odeya, the son of Mahamandaleshwara Veera Bukkana Odeya (Bukka Raya I) of the Vijayanagara Empire. Kampanna Odeya was ruling from Mulubaagil (Mulabagilu) at the time the stone was made.

The inscription documents a tax-exempt perpetual grant (i.e. a donation) bestowed by Kamaiya Nayaka to Taniappa, the son of Allalajeeya. The grant encompassed the village of Belattoor – situated in Torevalinaadu, south of Sannenaadu – and all dry and wet lands within its four boundaries. The donation was made in the presence of the Gavundas (village heads) of the kingdom, a term which has changed to related forms such as Gamunda, Gavaunda, Goundar, and Gauda since the 7th century. The inscription also reveals that Taniappa's father Allalajeeya originated from Yelahanka.

The inscription was first documented in Volume 9 of Epigraphia Carnatica, and as of May 2026 is housed in the Government Museum, Bengaluru.

=== Discovery and dating ===
Agara Kamaiya Nayaka's donation inscription was identified during field surveys based on information in Epigraphia Carnatica, Volume 9. The 1905 edition of Epigraphia Carnatica records that the inscription was brought to the Bangalore museum from Agara village, but it is unclear why the inscription was installed at Agara rather than Belattoor or Yelahanka. (The Belattoor mentioned is most likely Belathur in the Krishnarajapuram region, as noted in an inscription.)

The inscription is dated to Friday, 3 June 1362 CE (Julian calendar) based on the text: "śakābda 1286 nĕya śobhakṛtu saṃ| jyeṣṭa śu11 bu".

=== Physical characteristics ===
The inscription stone measures 148 cm tall by 123 cm wide, with the Kannada characters approximately 3 cm tall, 4 cm wide, and 0.24 cm deep.

=== Transliteration ===
The text below is a revised reading of the inscription from the Journal of the Mythic Society. (Digital images of each character in this inscription, images of the inscription itself, a summary, and additional information are available via the Mythic Society's Akshara Bhandara software.)

| Line Number | Kannada | IAST |
|---|---|---|
| 1 | ಸ್ವಸ್ತಿ ಶ್ರೀ ಶಕಾಬ್ದ ೧೨೮೬ | svasti śrī śakābda 1286 |
| 2 | ನೆಯ ಶೋಭಕೃತು ಸಂ| ಜ್ಯೇಷ್ಟ ಶು೧೧ | nĕya śobhakṛtu saṃ| jyeṣṭa śu11 |
| 3 | ಬು| ಶ್ರೀ ಮನುಮಹಾಮಂಡಳೇಶ್ವರಂ ಅರಿರಾ | bu| śrī manumahāmaṃḍaleśvaraṃ arir |
| 4 | ಯ ವಿಭಾಡ ಭಾಷೆಗೆ ತಪ್ಪುವ ರಾಯರಗಂಡ | ya vibhāḍa bhāṣĕgĕ tappuva rāyaragaṃḍa |
| 5 | ಶ್ರೀ ವೀರಬುಕ್ಕಣ್ಣವೊಡೆಯರ ಕುಮಾರ ಕಂಪಣ್ಣ | śrī vīrabukkaṇṇavŏḍĕyara kumāra kaṃpa ṇṇa |
| 6 | ವೊಡೆಯರು ಮುಳುಬಾಗಿಲ ಪಟ್ಟಣದಲು ಪ್ರು | vŏḍĕyaru mulubāgila paṭṭaṇadalu pru |
| 7 | ಥ್ವಿರಾಜ್ಯಂಗೆಯುತ್ತಿರಲು ಕಂಪಣ್ಣ ವೊಡೆಯರ | thvirājyaṃgĕyuttiralu kaṃpaṇṇa vŏḍĕyara |
| 8 | ಕುಮಾರ ಕಾಮೈಯನಾಯ್ಕರು ಯೀ ರಾಜ್ಯದ ಗವು | kumāra kāmaiyanāykaru yī rājyada gavu |
| 9 | ಂಡುಗಳ ಮುಂದಿಟ್ಟು ಎಲಹಕ್ಕನಾಡ ಅಲ್ಲಾ | ṃḍugal ̤ a muṃdiṭṭu ĕlahakkanāḍa allā |
| 10 | ಳಜೀಯನ ಮಗ ತಣ್ಣಿಯಪ್ಪಂಗೆ ಶಿಲಾಶಾಸನವ | lajīyana maga taṇṇiyappaṃgĕ śilāśāsanava |
| 11 | ಮಾಡಿಕೊಟ ಕ್ರಮವೆಂತೆದಡೆ‌ ಸಣ್ಣೆನಾಡ ತೆ | māḍikŏṭa kramavĕṃtĕdaḍĕ saṇṇĕnāḍa tĕ |
| 12 | ಂಕಣ ಬಾಗೆಯ ತೊಱೆವಳಿನಾಡ ಬೆಳತ್ತೂರನೂ | ṃkaṇa bāgĕya tŏṟĕval ̤ ināḍa bĕl ̤ a̤ttūranū |
| 13 | ಯೀ ವೂರ ಗದ್ದೆ ಬೆದ್ದಲು ಚತುಸ್ಸೀಮೆ ಯೇನು | yīvūra gaddĕ bĕddalu catussīmĕ yenu |
| | ಹಿಂಭಾಗ | Backside |
| 14 | ಳ್ಳದನೂ ಸರ್ವಮಾನ್ಯದ ಕೊಡಗೆಯಾಗಿ | ll̤adanū sarvamānyada kŏḍagĕyāgi |
| 15 | ಚಂದ್ರಾದಿತ್ಯರುಳ್ಳಂನಬರಸಲುವಂ | chaṃdrādityarull̤aṃnabarasaluvaṃ |
| 16 | ತಾಗಿ ಶಿಲಾ ಶಾಸನವ ಮಾಡಿಕ್ಕೊ | tāgi śilā śāsanava māḍikkŏ |
| 17 | ಟ್ಟೆವು ಮಂಗಳ ಮಹಾಶ್ರೀಃ | | ṭṭĕvu maṃgala mahāśrīḥ| |

=== Translation ===
The text has been published in Volume 9 of the Epigraphia Carnatica. It reads as follows:

"Be it well. (On the date specified), when (with usual titles) vira Bukkanna-Vodeyar's son Kampanna-Vodeyar was in the city of Mulubagil, ruling the kingdom of the world :— that Kampanna-Vodeyar's son Kamaiya-Nayaka, in the presence of the farmers of this kingdom, granted to Elahaka-nad Allala-jiya's son Tanniyappa, lands in Belattur of the Torevali-nad of the south of the. . . . . .nti-nad, as a sarvamanya kodage".

== 3. Shivappa Nayaka donatory inscription - 1515 CE ==
This hero stone inscription is written in the Kannada script and has been dated to 1515 CE, as mentioned in the inscription: "shalivahanashaka savirada nanuhayippattuelaneya yuvasamvatsarada bhadrapada Kudha 15 lu sumoparaga punya kala". The inscription was issued during the reign of Krishnadevaraya of the Karnataka Empire (Vijayanagara Empire), and records the donation of land by Shivappa Nayaka to the upkeep of the Agara Tank, intended for his father's spiritual elevation.

The Shivappa Nayaka donatory inscription is one of the most significant documented inscriptions as it records that the donation was made during a solar eclipse, testimony to the astronomical prowess of the region's medieval inhabitants. Another inscription in Bengaluru, one of the Kodigehalli inscriptions, also documents a donation being made during an eclipse, but the inscriptions belong to different periods of the Vijayanagara Empire.

This inscription was first documented in Volume 9 of Epigraphia Carnatica, but its current physical condition is unknown.

=== Transliteration of the inscription ===
The transliteration of the inscription has been published in Volume 9 of Epigraphia Carnatica. The exact transliteration of the inscription in Kannada and IAST is as follows.

| Line Number | Kannada | IAST |
|---|---|---|
| 1 | ಶುಭಮಸ್ಸತುಸ್ಯಸ್ತಿಶ್ರೀಜಯಾಭ್ಯುದಯಶಾಲಿವಾ | shubhamassatusyastiśrījayābhyudayashālivā |
| 2 | ಹನಶಕ(ವ)ರುಪಸಾವಿರದನಾನೂಹಯಿಪ್ಪತ್ತುಏ | hanashaka(va)rupasāviradanānūhayippattuye |
| 3 | ಳನೆಯಯುವಸಂವತ್ಸರದಭಾದ್ರಪದಕು | ḷneyayuvasaṃvatsaradabhādrapadaku |
| 4 | ಧ೧೫ಲೂಸೋಮೋಪರಾಗಪುಂಣ್ಯಕಾಲದಲ್ಲುಕ್ರುಷ್ಣ | dhā15lūsōmōparāgapuṇyakāladallukruṣhṇa |
| 5 | ರಾಯಮಹಾರಾಯರುವೃತ್ಯೀಗೈಉತಯಿರಲು | rāyamārāyaruvrutyigaiyutayiralu |
| 6 | ಸಿವಂಣಪನಾಯಕರುತಂಮತಂದೆಗೆಧರ್ಮವಾಗಬೇಕೆಂ | sivaṃṇapanāyakarutaṃtaṃdegedharmavāgabēkēm |
| 7 | ದುಅಗರದಕೆಹಗೆಭಂಡಿನಡೆಉದಕ್ಕೆಕೊಟ್ಟಹೊಲ | duagaradakehagebhandinadeudakkekottahola |

=== Translation ===
The text has been published in Volume 9 of the Epigraphia Carnatica. It reads as follows:

"May it be prosperous. Be it well (On the date specified), at the time of and eclipse of the moon, - when Krishna-Raya-maharaya was ruling the kingdom of the world :- Sivannappa-Nayaka, in order that dharma might be to his father, granted a field to provide for keeping up a cart for the Agara tank."

== See also ==
Kodigehalli (Bengaluru) Inscriptions and Herostones

Domlur (Tamil Nadu) inscriptions and hero stones
