= TIFR Centre for Applicable Mathematics =

Research institute in Bangalore, India

Tata Institute of Fundamental Research – Centre for Applicable Mathematics
- Parent institution: Tata Institute of Fundamental Research
- Location: Bangalore, India
- Website: math.tifrbng.res.in

The TIFR Centre for Applicable Mathematics is part of the School of Mathematics of the Tata Institute of Fundamental Research.

== History ==
The Institute was located in a bungalow on Pedder Road in Bombay called Kenilworth. On December 19, 1945, Bombay Governor Sir John Colville officially opened it. As the Institute expanded in 1949, it moved into the Old Yacht Club Building, which had previously housed the Royal Bombay Yacht Club, close to Gateway of India. The first to begin operation was the Cosmic Ray Group. In 1953, the Nuclear Emulsion and Electron Magnetism Group was established. The first pilot machine was put into service in 1956 after work in computer science and technology began in 1954. In February 1960, the full-scale device—later dubbed the TIFRAC—was put into service.

In 1954, Pandit Jawaharlal Nehru laid the foundation stone for the main building on the Colaba campus. Currently, this serves as the Institute's primary campus. Chicago architect Helmuth Bartsch created the contemporary structure on the waterfront with gardens, lawns, and a promenade. On January 15, 1962, Prime Minister Jawaharlal Nehru officially opened the structure.

=== Tripartite Agreement ===
The Government of Bombay, the Government of India, and the Sir Dorabji Tata Trust entered into a Tripartite Agreement at the Institute in 1955–1956. The Tripartite Agreement called for the Government of India to provide substantial financial support in exchange for a larger and more permanent representation on the Council of Management. The Indian government now covers almost 99% of the Institute's expenses. All grants are channeled through the Department of Atomic Energy, which oversees the Institute.

== Director of TIFR ==
The Institute's founder and director, Homi Bhabha, perished in an aircraft accident in 1966. Professor M.G.K. Menon succeeded him as the Institute's director. In 1975, Professor B.V. Sreekantan succeeded him. In 1987, Professor Virendra Singh was appointed Director; in 1997, Professor S.S. Jha took over. In 2002, Professor S. Bhattacharya was appointed Director; in 2007, Professor M. Barma; in 2015, Professor Sandip P. Trivedi; and in 2020, Professor S. Ramakrishnan. In July 2022, Professor Jayaram N. Chengalur became the current director.

== Research ==
=== Partial Differential Equations and Related Areas ===
- Problems in calculus of variations
- Qualitative and quantitative properties of solutions of differential equations
  - Elliptic and Parabolic PDE
  - Hyperbolic Equations and Conservation Laws
  - Euler and Navier-Stokes equations
- Inverse problems
- Geometry and analysis
- Optimal transportation problems
- Control theory problems of fluid flows

=== Probability Theory and Related Areas ===
- Stochastic differential equations
- Probability theory
- Ergodic Theory and dynamical systems
- Rough path theory, stochastic analysis
- Random Geometry, point processes

=== Complex Analysis and Related Areas ===
- Complex analysis
- Potential theory
- Several complex variables

=== Computational Science ===
- Numerical Analysis of differential equations
- Computational fluid dynamics
- Scientific computing and machine learning
- Geophysical fluid flows

== Consulting ==
The centre offers consulting at the individual and institutional levels in applying theory to engineering-related problems and in exposition of underlying mathematics.

== Education and programs ==
The centre has had an active role in training students in areas of applicable mathematics through the IISc-TIFR Joint Programme. Following the deemed university status of TIFR, the TIFR Centre has offered its own programs since 2004, which are:

- Ph.D.
- Integrated Ph.D. (M.Sc. and Ph.D.)

Among its other doctoral programs, the center has an integrated PhD program in mathematics. Eligible students for this program receive a monthly fellowship of Rs 21000 for the first year..

The centre has a program to invite visiting professors, both for disseminating new topics through lecture courses and for research collaboration.

The centre also offers post-doctoral fellowships and possibilities of short-term visits.

== Notable people ==
In September 2015, together with Ritabrata Munshi (from the Tata Institute of Fundamental Research), K. Sandeep (from the TIFR Centre for Applied Mathematics) obtained the Shanti Swarup Bhatnagar Prize for Science and Technology in the field of mathematical sciences.

In January 2019, the Indian Academy of Sciences announced that 23 scientists were elected as fellows of the academy, including Sandeep Kunnath (who studies partial differential equation, variational methods, and nonlinear functional analysis) and G D Veerappa Gowda, both from the TIFR Centre for Applicable Mathematics.
