= Byatarayanapura =

Byatarayanapura ಬ್ಯಾಟರಾಯನಪುರ B T Pura
- Neighbourhood
- Nickname: Gali Aanjaneya Ward
- Location in Karnataka, India
- Coordinates: 12.94°N 77.54°E
- Country: India
- State: Karnataka
- District: Bengaluru Urban
- Established: 1921
- Founder: Kempegowda
- Named for: God Byataraya Swamy

Government
  - Type: Vijayanagara
  - Body: MLA, Karnataka
  - Rank: 56

Population (2011)
  - Total: 180,931
  - Rank: 159

Languages
  - Official: Kannada
- Time zone: UTC+5:30 (IST)
- PIN: 560026
- ISO 3166 code: IN-KA
- Vehicle registration: KA 41
- Website: karnataka.gov.in

Byataryanapura is a suburb of Bangalore city in the state of Karnataka, India. It is famous for the Gali Aanjaneya Temple.

It has many educational institutions in and around

== Demographics ==
As of 2001's India census, Byatarayanapura had a population of 180,931. Males constituted 52% of the population and females 48%. Byatarayanapura had an average literacy rate of 73%, higher than the national average of 59.5%, with male literacy of 78% and female literacy of 67%. 12% of the population was under 6 years of age.

It's neighborhood areas covers Deepanjalinagar, RPC Layout, Bapujinagar, Timber Yard Layout, Girinagar and Veerabhadra Nagar.
