= Unmixed =

Compilation album by Freemasons
- Released: 29 October 2007
- Recorded: 2005–2007
- Genre: House
- Length: 54:05
- Label: Loaded
- Producer: Freemasons

Freemasons chronology
Shakedown (2007)	Unmixed (2007)	Shakedown 2 (2009)

Singles from Unmixed
- 1. "Uninvited" Released: 22 October 2007; 2. "When You Touch Me" Released: 23 June 2008; 3. "If" Released: 16 February 2009

Unmixed is the second album by house production duo Freemasons. It was released on 29 October 2007, with the lead single "Uninvited" being released one week earlier.

The album is unique, as unlike most DJ/Producers, the tracks are all unmixed full length versions. In addition, producer samples packs created by the Freemasons were included on a data portion of the album.

== Track listing ==
No.	Title	Writer(s)	Vocalist	Length
1.	"Uninvited"	Alanis Morissette	Bailey Tzuke	5:21
2.	"Rain Down Love"	Russell Small, James Wiltshire, Siedah Garrett, Neil Cowley	Siedah Garrett	3:20
3.	"If"	Phil Hurrt, Walter B. Sigler	Hazel Fernandez	6:24
4.	"Nothing but a Heartache"	Wayne Bickerton, Tony Waddington	Sylvia Mason-James	3:11
5.	"When You Touch Me"	Russell Small, James Wiltshire, Katherine Ellis	Katherine Ellis	4:16
6.	"Love on My Mind"	Graham Stack, John Reid, LeRoy Bell, Casey James, Russell Small, James Wiltshire	Amanda Wilson	5:13
7.	"Watchin'"	Russell Small, James Wiltshire, Kier Gist, Alonzo Jackson, Deandre Griffin, Tara Stinson-Jackson	Amanda Wilson	2:47
8.	"Desperados"	Russell Small, James Wiltshire	–	5:03
9.	"Love Don't Live Here Anymore"	Gregory Miles	Judie Tzuke	4:03
10.	"I Feel Like"	Finn Bjarnson, Ryan Raddon, Yoni Gileadi	Amanda Wilson	4:18
11.	"You're Not Alone Now"	Russell Small, James Wiltshire, Julie Thompson	Julie Thompson	4:34
12.	"Pacific"	Andrew Barker, Graham Massey, Darren Partington, Martin Price	–	5:36
Total length:				54:05

Enhanced Data Section (mp3)
No.	Title	Length
1.	"I Feel Like (Accapella)"	3:42
2.	"Love on My Mind (Accapella)"	1:54
3.	"Nothing but a Heartache (Accapella)"	1:54
4.	"Rain Down Love (Accapella)"	2:58
5.	"Uninvited (Accapella)"	2:58
6.	"Watchin' (Accapella)"	3:36
7.	"When You Touch Me (Accapella)"	3:46
8.	"You're Not Alone Now (Accapella)"	3:42
9.	"Love on My Mind (After Hours Mix)"	6:22
10.	"Rain Down Love (After Hours Mix)"	4:46
11.	"Watchin' (After Hours Mix)"	5:36
Total length:		43:12

Special Edition CD2
No.	Title	Length
1.	"When You Touch Me (2008 Radio Edit)"	3:21
2.	"When You Touch Me (2008 Club Mix)"	7:47
3.	"Rain Down Love (Club Mix)"	7:33
4.	"If (Full Length Extended Club Mix)"	8:31
5.	"Uninvited (Big Ocean Acoustic Mix)"	3:25
6.	"Love on My Mind (After Hours Mix)"	4:29
7.	"Watchin' (After Hours Mix)"	4:09
8.	"Nothing but a Heartache (After Hours Mix)"	6:00
9.	"Rain Down Love (After Hours Mix)"	4:50
10.	"Uninvited (After Hours Mix)"	4:37
Total length:		54:42

== Samples, covers and interpolations ==
- "Uninvited" is a cover of Alanis Morissette's song.
- "If" is a cover of Jackie Moore's song, released in 1973 on her album Sweet Charlie Babe.
- "Nothing But A Heartache" is a cover of The Flirtations' song.
- "Love on My Mind" incorporates lyrics from Tina Turner's song "When the Heartache Is Over" and samples Jackie Moore's song "This Time Baby".
- "Watchin'" incorporates elements from Deborah Cox's song "It's Over Now", released in 1998 on her album One Wish.
- "Love Don't Live Here Anymore" is a cover of Rose Royce's song.
- "Pacific" is a cover of 808 State's track "Pacific State".
- "I Feel Like" is a cover of Kaskade's song of the same name from his 2003 album It's You, It's Me.
