= Shakedown 2 =

Studio album by Freemasons
- Released: 29 June 2009
- Recorded: 2009
- Genre: House, dance
- Length: 132:48
- Label: Loaded Records
- Producer: Russell Small, James Wiltshire

Freemasons chronology
Unmixed (2007)	Shakedown 2 (2009)	Shakedown 3 (2014)

Singles from Shakedown 2
- 1. "Uninvited" Released: 22 October 2007; 2. "Heartbreak (Make Me a Dancer)" Released: 22 June 2009

Shakedown 2 is a compilation album by the Freemasons. It was released on 29 June 2009. The single "Heartbreak (Make Me A Dancer)" was released a week before, on 22 June 2009.

== Track listing ==
CD1
No.	Title	Writer(s)	Artist	Length
1.	"Sandcastle Disco (Freemasons Remix)"	Solange Knowles, Soulshock, Kenneth Karlin, Thomas Callaway	Solange Knowles	6:30
2.	"(Don't) Give Hate a Chance (Freemasons Remix)"	Jason Kay, Robert Harris, Matthew Johnson	Jamiroquai	5:07
3.	"Love Is the Answer (Freemasons Remix)"	Ashlee Akabah, Nickolas Ashford, Valerie Simpson	Funk Fanatics featuring Peyton	4:07
4.	"Uninvited"	Alanis Morissette	Freemasons featuring Bailey Tzuke	6:22
5.	"What a Wonderful World"	Axwell, Bob Sinclar, Ron Carroll	Axwell & Bob Sinclar	4:36
6.	"Disco Lies (Freemasons Remix)"	Moby	Moby	6:35
7.	"Keep This Fire Burning (Freemasons Remix)"	Robin Carlsson, Johan Ekhe, Ulf Lindstrom, Mikkel Sigvardt	Outsiders featuring Amanda Wilson	6:31
8.	"Hold On (Freemasons Remix)"	Dima Frolov	Mr DYF featuring Shèna	4:16
9.	"Pjanoo"	Eric Prydz	Freemasons	0:45
10.	"Watchin'"	Russell Small, James Wiltshire, Kier Gist, Alonzo Jackson, Deandre Griffin, Tara Stinson-Jackson	Freemasons featuring Amanda Wilson	3:44
11.	"Colours"	Calvin Harris	Calvin Harris	0:59
12.	"Free"	Ultra Naté, Lem Springsteen, John Ciafone	Ultra Naté	3:45
13.	"When You Touch Me"	Russell Small, James Wiltshire, Katherine Ellis	Freemasons featuring Katherine Ellis	5:29
14.	"Love on My Mind"	Graham Stack, John Reid, LeRoy Bell, Casey James, Russell Small, James Wiltshire	Freemasons featuring Amanda Wilson	6:16
15.	"Take Me 2 the Sun" (HMV Exclusive Bonus Track)	Mr. Groove, Vergas, Danny Kirsch, Si Paul	Disco Freaks	6:16
Total length:				65:02

CD2
No.	Title	Writer(s)	Artist	Length
1.	"Ring the Alarm (Freemasons Remix)"	Beyoncé Knowles, Kasseem "Swizz Beatz" Dean, Sean Garrett	Beyoncé	6:22
2.	"Work (Freemasons Remix)"	Jason "Pooh Bear" Boyd, Scott Storch, Kelly Rowland	Kelly Rowland	6:56
3.	"Phantom (Freemasons Remix)"	Gaspard Augé, Xavier de Rosnay	Justice	4:00
4.	"Blue Monday (Freemasons Remix)"	Bernard Sumner, Peter Hook, Stephen Morris, Gillian Gilbert	New Order	4:30
5.	"The One (Freemasons Remix)"	Kylie Minogue, Richard "Biff" Stannard, James Wiltshire, Russell Small, John Andersson, Johan Emmoth, Emma Holmgren	Kylie	5:50
6.	"Ghosts & Stuff"	Joel Zimmerman, Rob Swire	Deadmau5	1:15
7.	"People Hold On"	Jonathan More, Matt Black, Lisa Stansfield	Coldcut & Lisa Stansfield	3:30
8.	"Disco's Revenge (Freemasons Remix)"	Edward Green, Kenny Mason, Sally Mason	Gusto	4:48
9.	"Here Comes the Rain Again (Freemasons Remix)"	Annie Lennox, David A. Stewart	Eurythmics	5:59
10.	"Alright"	Patrick Bruyndokx, Raffaele Brescia	Red Carpet	1:56
11.	"Finally"	Jason "Sinister" Sealee	Kings of Tomorrow	4:33
12.	"Heartbreak (Make Me a Dancer) (Freemasons Remix)"	Sophie Ellis-Bextor, James Wiltshire, Russell Small, Richard Stannard	Freemasons featuring Sophie Ellis-Bextor	6:50
13.	"Rain Down Love"	Russell Small, James Wiltshire, Siedah Garrett, Neil Cowley	Freemasons featuring Siedah Garrett	6:30
14.	"Heard It Through the Grapevine (Freemasons Remix)"	Norman Whitfield, Barrett Strong	Marvin Gaye	4:44
Total length:				67:43

== Charts ==
Chart (2009)	Peak position
Irish Top 30 Compilations	39
UK Compilation Albums (OCC)	17
