= Shakedown (album) =

Studio album by Freemasons
- Released: 21 January 2007
- Recorded: 2005–06
- Genre: House; dance
- Length: 170:26; 178:56 (HMV Edition)
- Label: Loaded Records
- Producer: Russell Small; James Wiltshire

Freemasons chronology
| Shakedown (2007) | Unmixed (2007) |

Singles from Shakedown
- 1. "Love on My Mind" Released: 21 August 2005; 2. "Watchin'" Released: 26 February 2006; 3. "Rain Down Love" Released: 7 January 2007; 4. "Nothing but a Heartache" Released: 18 June 2007

Shakedown is the debut album by English house production duo Freemasons. It was released on 21 January 2007, with the single "Rain Down Love" being released two weeks earlier in anticipation of the album. "Nothing But a Heartache", a cover of the original single by the Flirtations, was released as a digital download single on iTunes on 18 June 2007.

== Background ==
Beyoncé's manager approached English production team Freemasons to remix "Déjà Vu" after hearing a remix they made for a song by singer Heather Headley. A club-oriented version was produced and appeared on a "Green Light" Freemasons EP, released on 31 July 2007. A maxi single, featuring the album version of the track and Freemasons club mix, was released on 5 August 2006 in European countries.

== Critical reception ==
Professional ratings
Review scores
| Source | Rating |
|---|---|
| AllMusic | link |

Their remix of "Déjà Vu" was nominated for Best Remixed Recording, Non-Classical at the 2007 Grammy Awards.

== Track listing ==
CD1
| No. | Title | Writer(s) | Artist | Length |
|---|---|---|---|---|
| 1. | "Intro" | James Wiltshire, Russel Small | Freemasons | 0:14 |
| 2. | "Déjà Vu (Freemasons Remix)" | Beyoncé Knowles, Rodney Jerkins, Makeba Riddick, Keli Nicole Price, Delisha Thomas | Beyoncé | 5:44 |
| 3. | "Zap Me Lovely" | Ben Rosen, David Wilson | Trick vs. Freemasons | 3:44 |
| 4. | "I Feel Like" | Finn Bjarnson, Ryan Raddon, Yoni Gileadi | Freemasons featuring Amanda Wilson | 4:44 |
| 5. | "Atlantic" | Russell Small, James Wiltshire | Freemasons | 4:07 |
| 6. | "Pacific" (saxapella) | Andrew Barker, Graham Massey, Darren Partington, Martin Price | Freemasons | 1:30 |
| 7. | "Right Here, Right Now (Freemasons Remix)" | Norman Cook, Joe Walsh, Dale Peters | Fatboy Slim | 5:52 |
| 8. | "Love Sensation (Freemasons Remix)" | Dan Hartman | Loleatta Holloway | 7:16 |
| 9. | "Mesmerized (Freemasons Remix)" | George Benson, Homer Banks, Don Davis, Raymond Jackson, Bettye Crutcher, Faith Evans, Todd Russaw, Donald Sebesky, Chucky Thompson, Andre 'AJ' Johnson, Stephanie Johnson, Kameelah Williams | Faith Evans | 6:37 |
| 10. | "Nothing but a Heartache" | Wayne Bickerton, Tony Waddington | Freemasons featuring Sylvia Mason-James | 4:48 |
| 11. | "I Wasn't Kidding (Freemasons Remix)" | Andrea Martin, Adrian Austin, Cecil Womack, Linda Womack | Angie Stone | 5:07 |
| 12. | "Rain Down Love" | Russell Small, James Wiltshire, Siedah Garrett, Neil Cowley | Freemasons featuring Siedah Garrett | 4:29 |
| 13. | "Most Precious Love (Freemasons Remix)" | Blaze | Blaze featuring Barbara Tucker | 7:00 |
| 14. | "Turn Me On (Freemasons Remix)" | Kathy Brown, Cevin Fisher, David Shaw, Kenny Gamble, Leon Huff | Dirty Old Ann | 4:17 |
| Total length: | | | | 65:29 |

CD2
| No. | Title | Writer(s) | Artist | Length |
|---|---|---|---|---|
| 1. | "In My Mind (Freemasons Remix)" | Shannon Sanders, Drew Ramsey | Heather Headley | 5:23 |
| 2. | "Love on My Mind (Freemasons Remix)" | Graham Stack, John Reid, LeRoy Bell, Casey James, Russell Small, James Wiltshire | Freemasons featuring Amanda Wilson | 5:37 |
| 3. | "Vacancies" | James Wiltshire, Russell Small | Freemasons | 0:45 |
| 4. | "Love Don't Live Here Anymore" | Gregory Miles | Freemasons featuring Judie Tzuke | 4:44 |
| 5. | "Take Me 2 the Sun (Freemasons Remix)" | Mr. Groove, Vergas, Danny Kirsch, Si Paul | Disco Freaks featuring Rob Li | 5:14 |
| 6. | "C'mon Get It On (Freemasons Dub Mix)" | Si Hulbert, Harry Wilkins, Daniel Anderson | Studio B | 3:45 |
| 7. | "Boy (Meets Girl)" | James Wiltshire, Russell Small | Walken | 4:00 |
| 8. | "When You Touch Me" | Russell Small, James Wiltshire, Katherine Ellis | Freemasons featuring Katherine Ellis | 4:15 |
| 9. | "Watchin'" | Russell Small, James Wiltshire, Kier Gist, Alonzo Jackson, Deandre Griffin, Tara Stinson-Jackson | Freemasons featuring Amanda Wilson | 6:44 |
| 10. | "Desperados" | James Wiltshire, Russell Small | Freemasons | 5:59 |
| 11. | "You're Not Alone Now" | James Wiltshire, Russell Small, Julie Thompson | Freemasons featuring Julie Thompson | 5:15 |
| 12. | "I Just Can't Get Enough (Freemasons Remix)" | Jason Herd, Jon Fitz | Herd & Fitz featuring Abigail Bailey | 7:33 |
| 13. | "Rain Down Love (After Hours Mix)" | Russell Small, James Wiltshire, Siedah Garrett, Neil Cowley | Freemasons featuring Siedah Garrett | 4:46 |
| 14. | "Love on My Mind (After Hours Mix)" | Graham Stack, John Reid, LeRoy Bell, Casey James, Russell Small, James Wiltshire | Freemasons featuring Amanda Wilson | 4:24 |
| 15. | "Watchin' (After Hours Mix)" | Russell Small, James Wiltshire, Kier Gist, Alonzo Jackson, Deandre Griffin, Tara Stinson-Jackson | Freemasons featuring Amanda Wilson | 4:05 |
| Total length: | | | | 72:14 |

Enhanced Data Section (mp3)
| No. | Title | Writer(s) | Artist | Length |
|---|---|---|---|---|
| 1. | "Atlantic" | James Wiltshire, Russell Small | Freemasons | 6:31 |
| 2. | "I'm Not Alone Now" | James Wiltshire, Russell Small, Julie Thompson | Freemasons featuring Julie Thompson | 7:14 |
| 3. | "Desperados" | James Wiltshire, Russell Small | Freemasons | 7:00 |
| 4. | "Vacancies" | James Wiltshire, Russell Small | Freemasons | 6:46 |
| 5. | "Boy (Meets Girl)" | James Wiltshire, Russell Small | Walken | 6:26 |
| Total length: | | | | 33:57 |

== In other media ==
- The song "Zap Me Lovely" was featured in a Nokia TV advert in Winter 2004, promoting a series of phones, including the Nokia 7280.
