= Love on My Mind (Freemasons song) =

2005 single by Freemasons

Single by Freemasons featuring Amanda Wilson

from the album Shakedown, Unmixed and Shakedown 2
- Released: 22 August 2005
- Length: 2:59
- Label: Loaded
- Songwriters: Graham Stack; John Reid; Russell Small; James Wiltshire; Leroy Bell; Casey James
- Producer: Freemasons

Freemasons singles chronology
"Love on My Mind" (2005)	"Watchin'" (2006)

Amanda Wilson singles chronology
"Love on My Mind" (2005)	"Electric Love" (2006)

Music video
- "Love on My Mind" on YouTube

"Love on My Mind" is a song by British dance music duo Freemasons. It was released as the first single from their debut album, Shakedown (2007), and features vocals from British singer Amanda Wilson. The song's melody and some of its lyrics sample the 1979 hit "This Time Baby" by Jackie Moore. Additionally, it includes the lyrics from the chorus of the Tina Turner song "When the Heartache Is Over".

Released as a single on 22 August 2005, "Love on My Mind" peaked at number 11 on the UK Singles Chart and reached the top 40 in Flanders, Ireland and the Netherlands. It also charted in Australia, where it was the third-most successful club hit of 2005, and in the United States, where it peaked at number two on the Billboard Hot Dance Airplay chart, becoming Freemasons' most successful single in the US.

== Track listing ==
Digital single
No.	Title	Length
1.	"Love on My Mind" (Freemasons remix)	7:58
2.	"Love on My Mind" (King Unique mix)	6:18
3.	"Love on My Mind" (radio edit)	2:59
4.	"Love on My Mind" (dub mix)	8:20
5.	"Love on My Mind" (The Sharp Boys Royal House vocal mix)	7:12
6.	"Love on My Mind" (AFTC remix)	7:30
7.	"Love on My Mind" (King Unique dirty dub)	6:35

== Charts ==
=== Weekly charts ===
Weekly chart performance for "Love on My Mind"
Chart (2005)	Peak position
Australia (ARIA)	46
Australian Club Chart (ARIA)	4
Belgium (Ultratop 50 Flanders)	27
Belgium (Ultratip Bubbling Under Wallonia)	14
Belgium Dance (Ultratop Flanders)	29
France (SNEP)	70
Ireland (IRMA)	38
Ireland Dance (IRMA)	7
Italy (Musica e dischi)	37
Netherlands (Dutch Top 40)	26
Netherlands (Single Top 100)	41
Scotland Singles (Official Charts)	15
UK Singles (Official Charts)	11
UK Dance (Official Charts)	1
UK Indie (Official Charts)	2
US Hot Dance Airplay (Billboard)	2

=== Year-end charts ===
Year-end chart performance for "Love on My Mind"
Chart (2005)	Position
Australian Club Chart (ARIA)	3
US Hot Dance Airplay (Billboard)	32

== Certifications ==
Certifications for "Love on My Mind"
Region	Certification	Certified units/sales
United Kingdom (BPI)	Silver	200,000^{‡}
^{‡} Sales+streaming figures based on certification alone.

== Release history ==
Release dates and formats for "Love on My Mind"
Region	Date	Format(s)	Label(s)	Ref.
United Kingdom	22 August 2005	12-inch vinyl; CD	Loaded	
Australia	17 October 2005	CD	Sony BMG Australia	
