= Tzuke =

Tzuke is a surname. Notable people with the surname include:

- Bailey Tzuke (born 1987), British singer-songwriter
- Judie Tzuke (born 1956), English singer-songwriter
