= Watchin' =

Single by Freemasons featuring Amanda Wilson

from the album Unmixed and Shakedown
- Released: 27 February 2006
- Recorded: London, UK
- Genre: Nu-disco
- Length: 2:46
- Label: Loaded
- Songwriters: Russell Small, James Wiltshire, Kier Gist, Alonzo Jackson, Deandre Griffin, Tara Stinson-Jackson
- Producer: Freemasons

Freemasons singles chronology
"Love on My Mind" (2005)	"Watchin'" (2006)	"Rain Down Love" (2007)

Amanda Wilson singles chronology
"Electric Love" (2006)	"Watchin'" (2006)	"I Feel Like" (2007)

Music video
- "Watchin'" on YouTube

"Watchin'" is a song by English dance music duo Freemasons. The song is a remake of Deborah Cox's "It's Over Now", from her 1998 album One Wish. It was released as the second single from their second studio album Unmixed and features vocals from British singer Amanda Wilson.

== Track listing ==
"Watchin'"
No.	Title	Length
1.	"Watchin'"	2:47
2.	"Watchin'" (Club Mix)	7:47
3.	"Watchin'" (Walken Mix)	6:46
4.	"Watchin'" (Dub Mix)	6:57
5.	"Watchin'" (Motivo Mix)	8:22
6.	"Watchin'" (Club Mix Instrumental)	7:45

== Charts ==
Weekly chart performance for "Watchin'"
Chart (2006)	Peak position
Belgium (Ultratop 50 Flanders)	34
Belgium (Ultratip Bubbling Under Wallonia)	6
Finland (Suomen virallinen lista)	5
Ireland (IRMA)	49
Netherlands (Dutch Top 40)	29
Netherlands (Single Top 100)	44
UK Singles (OCC)	19

Year-end chart rankings for "Watchin'"
Chart (2006)	Position
Netherlands (Dutch Top 40)	192
