= LeRoy Bell =

American Musician

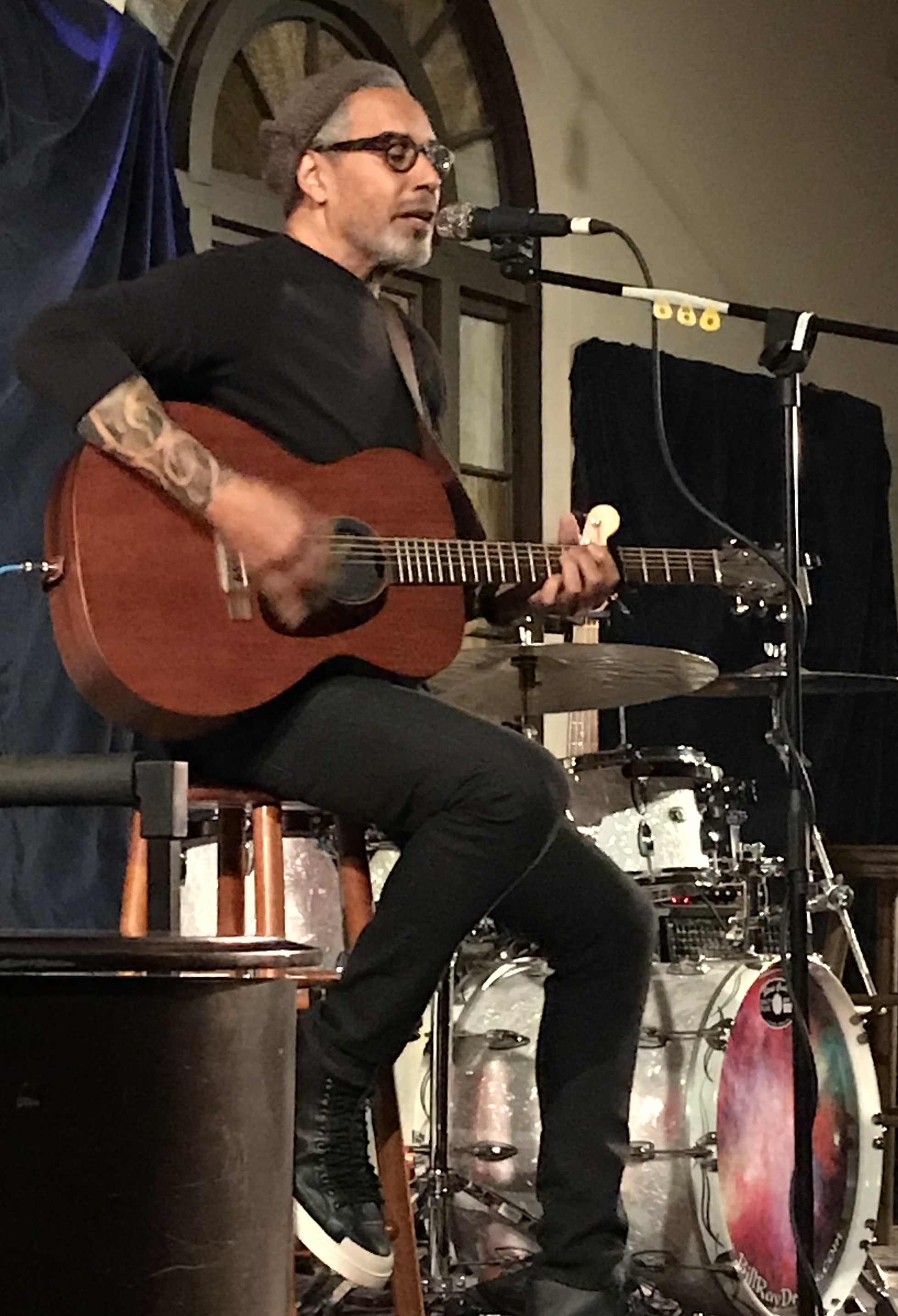

Background information
- Born: LeRoy Martez Bell III; August 8, 1951 (age 75); Pensacola, Florida, U.S.
- Genres: Soul, R&B, pop, rock
- Occupations: Singer-songwriter, record producer, musician
- Instruments: Vocals, guitar, drums
- Years active: 1968–present
- Members: Terry Morgan, Jason Cameron, Ben Smith
- Past members: Davis Martin, Rick Novito, Daniel Walker, Murl Sanders
- Website: www.leroybell.com

LeRoy Bell (born August 8, 1951) is an American singer and songwriter. He and his friend Casey James played in Special Blend, and then went on to form their own duo Bell and James, also composing songs that were hits for other artists most notably two charting hit singles for Elton John. Later Bell became a member of the trio Only Friends. In 2011, Bell applied for the American The X Factor and was chosen for the Final 16 and went on to the live shows being mentored by Nicole Scherzinger. He was eliminated after the fifth live show being the sixth contestant eliminated in the inaugural season of the American The X Factor when he was in bottom three with Marcus Canty and Lakoda Rayne.

== Background ==
LeRoy Martez Bell was born in Florida on August 8, 1951. He is a son of Leroy and Janice Marie (Zaragoza) Bell. His father is the half-brother of music producer Thom Bell. As a military family, they moved frequently, until settling in Tacoma, Washington in 1965.

== Bell and James ==
Bell and James was a duo soul group formed by LeRoy Bell (on drums and guitar) and Casey James (on guitar, bass and keyboards). They both had played for a while in the band Special Blend, before they decided to team up together as Bell and James. The duo released three albums: Bell and James (1978), Only Make Believe (1979) and In Black and White (1980), and had a number of singles, the most successful and well-known being "Livin' It Up (Friday Night)" released on A&M Records. It reached #15 on the U.S. Hot 100.

LeRoy also released his own EP "Spending Time" on his own label, Martez Music Group, releasing "Two Sides to Every Story" from the EP as a single.

== Songwriting ==
LeRoy Bell also co-wrote many songs for others in partnership with Casey James. They were encouraged by LeRoy's uncle Thom Bell who owned Mighty Three Music, a music production company along with Kenny Gamble and Leon Huff. The latter were a famous composing duo collaboration Gamble and Huff to whom Bell and James provided some of their compositions.

Their songs were recorded by a number of artists including:

- The Spinners
- The O'Jays (notably in "This Time Baby")
- The Temptations
- Rita Marley
- Gladys Knight & the Pips
- Freda Payne
- The Three Degrees

With Elton John
Most notably, two of the LeRoy Bell songs were recorded by Elton John. One was "Mama Can't Buy You Love" and the other "Are You Ready for Love". The songs, LeRoy Bell-Casey James co-compositions, appeared in "The Thom Bell Sessions" in 1977. Elton John's version of "Mama Can't Buy You Love" went to the Top 10 in the general charts and #1 on the Adult/Contemporary chart in the fall of 1979, earning Elton a Grammy Nomination for "Best Male R&B Vocal Performance". His song "Are You Ready for Love" did not chart.

Track list of Elton John single:

- Side 1: "Are You Ready for Love" (LeRoy Bell, Thom Bell, Casey James) (8:31)
- Side 2.1: "Three Way Love Affair" (LeRoy Bell, Casey James) (5:31)
- Side 2.2: "Mama Can't Buy You Love" (LeRoy Bell, Casey James) (4:03)

In February 1989, The Complete Thom Bell Sessions was released by MCA Records, although it had been recorded in 1977. In addition to "Mama Can't Buy You Love" and "Are You Ready for Love", it featured three additional songs, including "Country Love Song" also co-written by LeRoy Bell.

1. "Nice and Slow" (Elton John, Bernie Taupin, Thom Bell)
2. "Country Love Song" (LeRoy Bell, Casey James)
3. "Shine on Through" (Elton John, G. Osborne)
4. "Mama Can't Buy You Love" (LeRoy Bell, Casey James)
5. "Are You Ready for Love" (LeRoy Bell, Casey James)
6. "Three Way Love Affair" (LeRoy Bell, Casey James)

In 2003, Fat Boy Slim mixed Elton John's single version making it to the British Singles Chart. The song also charted in many European charts.

With Teddy Pendergrass
LeRoy Bell had a long-running cooperation with Teddy Pendergrass for whom he wrote 5 songs in three different albums:

- 1979: "I'll Never See Heaven Again" on the album Teddy
- 1979: "Set Me Free", also on album Teddy
- 1982: "Loving You Was Good" on album This One's for You
- 1983: "Heaven Only Knows" from the album Heaven Only Knows (lead song) Pendergrass album
- 1990: "Glad to Be Alive" from the album Truly Blessed

Others:

- 1979: Lou Rawls: "Bark, Bite (Fight All Night)" on the album Let Me Be Good to You
- 1980: Lou Rawls: "Heartache (Just When You Think You're Loved)" and "You Are" on album Sit Down and Talk to Me
- 1988: Kimiko Kasai: "Love Talk" from album Love Talk (lead song)
- 2001: Me and You: "You Never Know What You Got (Til It's Gone)"
- 2002: Jennifer Lopez: "Still" cowritten with James and Jennifer Lopez herself in the latter's album This Is Me... Then.
- 2005: The Freemasons: "Love on My Mind" that appears on albums Shakedown, Unmixed and Shakedown 2
- He has also written for Phyllis Hyman

== Solo career ==
Starting in the 2000s, he worked solo and toured extensively. In the process, he released various albums including his debut solo EP Spending Time (on his own label Martez Music Group), followed by Two Sides to Every Story in 2006, A Change Is Coming in 2008 and Traces in 2010.

In 2011, he was part of a project United in Song affiliated to USA For Africa to bring the best in World Music to celebrate peace and unity. The project included Angelique Kidjo, Michael Franti & Spearhead, Aurelio Martinez with Youssou N'Dour, Lila Downs, Sierra Leone's Refugee All Stars, Razia Said, Abigail Washburn & the Shanghai Restoration Project, Luisa Maita, G Love & Special Sauce, and Vieux Farka Toure and LeRoy Bell contributing tracks to United in Song

== LeRoy Bell and His Only Friends ==
LeRoy Bell and His Friends
- Genres: Pop, R&B, Soul
- Members: LeRoy Bell; Terry Morgan; Davis Martin
- Website: www.leroybell.com

LeRoy Bell also formed his band Only Friends as LeRoy Bell and His Only Friends, featuring Terry Morgan on bass and Davis Martin on drums. Both are experience musicians. Morgan had played with Dee Daniels, Pat Wright & The Total Experience Gospel Choir, Dave Lewis, Thelma Houston and others, whereas Martin was previously a member of the band Maktub.

== The X Factor ==
In 2011, he applied for the American version of The X Factor, singing the song "Lean on Me" at his audition. Becoming one of the Top 32, he performed in Judges House Bob Dylan's "Make You Feel My Love" in front of Enrique Iglesias and mentor Nicole Scherzinger becoming one of the contestants (top 16), qualifying for the live shows in the over 30s category mentored by Scherzinger.

During the live shows, he had the following performances:

=== Performances and results ===
Episode	Theme	Song choice	Original artist	Order	Result
Audition	Auditioner's Choice	"Lean on Me"	Bill Withers	—N/a	Through to Bootcamp
Bootcamp	Group Performance	"Desperado" with Dani Knights, Skyelor Anderson, Chelsea Musick, Ben Rue, Paige Ogle and Cari Fletcher	Eagles	—N/a	Advanced
Judges' Houses	Solo	"Make You Feel My Love"	Bob Dylan	—N/a	Through to Live Shows
Live Show 1	—N/a	"Nobody Knows"	Pink	10	Saved by Nicole Scherzinger
Live Show 2	—N/a	"I'm Already There"	Lonestar	3	Safe (8th)
Live Show 3	Songs from Movies	"I Still Haven't Found What I'm Looking For"	U2	4	Safe (5th)
Live Show 4	Rock songs	"We've Got Tonight"	Bob Seger & The Silver Bullet Band	1	Safe (6th)
Live Show 5	Giving Thanks	"Angel"	Sarah McLachlan	6	Bottom Three
Final Showdown (Week 5)	Free Choice	"Don't Let Me Down"	The Beatles	2	Eliminated via Deadlock (8th)

On November 22, 2011, he was voted bottom three by public vote and had to sing for survival against Marcus Canty. He chose to sing The Beatles song "Don't Let Me Down". The result went to deadlock and the public vote revealed Bell had received the fewer votes and accordingly was eliminated after Live Show 5 finishing 8th overall in competition.

== Discography ==
=== Albums ===
==== As part of Bell and James ====
- 1978: Bell and James
- 1979: Only Make Believe
- 1980: In Black and White

==== With others ====
- 2020: Stony Hill with G.E. Smith

==== Solo ====
- 2004: Spending Time (EP) (on his own label Martez Music Group)
- 2006: Two Sides to Every Story
- 2008: A Change Is Coming
- 2010: Traces

==== As LeRoy Bell and His Only Friends ====
- 2007: Live in 3D
- 2013: Rock 'N Soul

=== Singles ===
==== As part of Bell and James ====
- 1979: Livin' It Up (Friday Night)
- 1979: Shakedown
- 1979: You Never Know What You've Got
- 1980: Only Make Believe

==== Solo ====
- Two Sides to Every Story

==== Featuring ====
- 2013: Miss Me with Paolo Noise
