= Uninvited (song) =

1998 single by Alanis Morissette

Single by Alanis Morissette

from the album City of Angels: Music from the Motion Picture
- Released: February 24, 1998
- Genre: Alternative rock
- Length: 4:34
- Label: Maverick
- Songwriter: Alanis Morissette
- Producers: Alanis Morissette, Rob Cavallo

Alanis Morissette singles chronology
"All I Really Want" (1996)	"Uninvited" (1998)	"Thank U" (1998)

"Uninvited" is a song by Canadian recording artist and songwriter Alanis Morissette, released as a single from the soundtrack of City of Angels in February 1998, becoming Morissette's first new recording since her international debut album, Jagged Little Pill (1995). Morissette wrote the song and co-produced it with Rob Cavallo. "Uninvited" is driven by four piano notes and builds to an instrumental climax with a haunting atmosphere.

Because the song was not released as a physical single in the United States, it was not allowed to chart on the Billboard Hot 100 due to rules in place at the time. It instead appeared on the Hot 100 Airplay chart, peaking at number four in June 1998. In Canada, "Uninvited" reached number seven on the RPM 100 Hit Tracks chart. Elsewhere, the single peaked at number one in El Salvador and number six in Iceland. In 1999, the song won two Grammy Awards: Best Female Rock Vocal Performance and Best Rock Song.

== Background and release ==
After the massive success of her breakthrough album, Jagged Little Pill (1995) (which spawned the worldwide hits "You Oughta Know", "Ironic", "Head over Feet" and "You Learn"), Morissette was considered one of the biggest music stars in the world, and many fans anxiously awaited a follow-up album. That would be Supposed Former Infatuation Junkie, released in November 1998; however, "Uninvited" was released as the lead single from the City of Angels soundtrack prior to that.

"Uninvited" was released to American radio stations in March 1998 and was still receiving substantial radio airplay by the following August. An internet and radio leak of "Uninvited" in early March forced Warner Bros. to release the entire soundtrack to radio before it became available in stores. According to a publicity manager for Warner Music Canada, the measure was "an inconvenience" taken to stop radio stations from playing low-quality versions of the song downloaded from the internet.

Following the song's leak, the Recording Industry Association of America (RIAA) took down several websites featuring the song. "Uninvited" was due for release on March 31, but was leaked to radio on March 6. Newsbytes, a computer industry news service, reported that fast-working fans in Los Angeles, upon hearing the song on KROQ, taped the track and uploaded it onto their websites. Several sites were involved, according to Newsbytes, including ones based in Los Angeles, London and Mexico City. The unauthorized material was removed, and in several cases, the whole site was shut down. The action was part of a campaign by the RIAA to stop unauthorized reproductions of recordings on the internet.

"Uninvited" was not included on Supposed Former Infatuation Junkie, but a demo version was included as a bonus track on the Australian, Japanese, and 25th anniversary releases of the album as well as a B-side in the UK CD single for "Thank U". The compilation Alanis Morissette: The Collection (2005) was Morissette's first album to include the song in its original studio format; she had performed an acoustic version of the song during her 1999 MTV Unplugged appearance, which was released as the album Alanis Unplugged. An acoustic version of the song was also included on the video album Live in the Navajo Nation.

== Composition ==
"Uninvited" is driven by four piano notes and builds to an instrumental climax. According to one critic, "Uninvited" is a moody song that contains an "indelible melody and haunting atmosphere" accompanied by cryptic lyrics.

== Reception ==
"Uninvited" was nominated for three Grammy Awards in 1998: Best Female Rock Vocal Performance, Best Rock Song and Best Song Written Specifically for a Motion Picture or for Television, winning in the Female Rock Vocal and Best Rock Song categories. It also won an ASCAP Award for Most Performed Song from Motion Pictures and received a Golden Globe nomination for Best Original Song - Motion Picture. Additionally, the song entered About.com's "Top 10 Alanis Morissette Lyrics" list at number 10, with Bill Lamb picking the lyrics, "Like anyone would be, I am flattered by your fascination with me, Like any hot blooded woman, I have simply wanted an object to crave" as the best. Although never officially released as a single to retail outlets (which prevented it from charting on the Billboard Hot 100), the song became a hit for Morissette. "Uninvited" was Morissette's fourth number-one single on the Billboard Top 40 Mainstream chart and it reached the top five on the Adult Top 40 and the top 40 on the Modern Rock Tracks chart. It became a success in El Salvador, peaking at number one, becoming Morissette's first chart-topper there. Worldwide, "Uninvited" sold over seven million copies.

== Music video ==
No music video accompanied the single's release, but three videos of performances of "Uninvited" were released: the first one at the 1999 Grammy Awards, another on the Feast on Scraps (2002) release, and another on the extended cut of VH1 Storytellers: Alanis Morissette. This performance was not included in the original Storytellers broadcast in 1999.

== Personnel ==
- Alanis Morissette – vocals, producer
- Rob Cavallo – producer, acoustic guitar
- Allen Sides – engineer, mixing
- Greg Burns, Chris Haynes – second engineers
- Nick Lashley – acoustic guitar
- Chris Chaney – bass guitar
- Gary Novak – drums, percussion
- Jamie Muhoberac – keyboards, piano
- Carmen Rizzo – programming
- David Campbell – string arrangement

== Charts ==
=== Weekly charts ===
Chart (1998)	Peak position
Canada Top Singles (RPM)	7
Canada Adult Contemporary (RPM)	23
Canada Rock/Alternative (RPM)	3
El Salvador (El Siglo de Torreón)	1
Iceland (Íslenski Listinn Topp 40)	6
US Radio Songs (Billboard)	4
US Adult Pop Airplay (Billboard)	3
US Alternative Airplay (Billboard)	26
US Pop Airplay (Billboard)	1
US Alternative (Radio & Records)	25
US CHR/Pop (Radio & Records)	1
US CHR/Rhythmic (Radio & Records)	49
US Hot AC (Radio & Records)	3
US Pop/Alternative (Radio & Records)	3

Chart (2009)	Peak position
Denmark (Tracklisten)	24

Chart (2025)	Peak position
UK Singles Downloads (OCC)	39
UK Singles Sales (OCC)	44

=== Year-end charts ===
Chart (1998)	Position
Canada Top Singles (RPM)	20
Canada Rock/Alternative (RPM)	37
Iceland (Íslenski Listinn Topp 40)	63
US Hot 100 Airplay (Billboard)	26
US Adult Top 40 (Billboard)	13
US Mainstream Top 40 (Billboard)	13
US Modern Rock Tracks (Billboard)	81
US Alternative (Radio & Records)	81
US CHR/Pop (Radio & Records)	17
US Hot AC (Radio & Records)	10

== Notable covers ==
=== Freemasons version ===
"Uninvited"

Single by Freemasons featuring Bailey Tzuke

from the album Unmixed
- Released: October 22, 2007
- Length: 3:08
- Label: Universal
- Songwriter: Alanis Morissette
- Producer: Freemasons

Freemasons singles chronology
"Nothing but a Heartache" (2007)	"Uninvited" (2007)	"When You Touch Me" (2008)

Bailey Tzuke singles chronology
"Uninvited" (2007)	"All I Need" (2013)

Music video
- "Uninvited" on YouTube

English band Freemasons recorded a version of "Uninvited" featuring British singer and songwriter Bailey Tzuke for their 2007 album, Unmixed. This version experienced success in the United Kingdom and European markets. To date, the song is the band's highest-charting single in the United Kingdom, peaking at number eight on the Official Singles Chart for three weeks, topping the UK Dance Chart, and receiving a gold certification from the British Phonographic Industry for selling more than 400,000 copies. The single experienced the most commercial success in the Flanders region of Belgium, reaching number two on the Ultratop 50 in February 2008.

==== Charts ====
===== Weekly charts =====
Chart (2007–2008)	Peak position
Australia Physical Singles (ARIA)	39
Belgium (Ultratop 50 Flanders)	2
Belgium (Ultratop 50 Wallonia)	11
France (SNEP)	11
Hungary (Dance Top 40)	1
Hungary (Rádiós Top 40)	8
Ireland (IRMA)	50
Netherlands (Dutch Top 40)	4
Netherlands (Single Top 100)	5
Romania (Romanian Top 100)	39
Scottish Singles Sales (Official Charts)	9
UK Singles (Official Charts)	8
UK Dance (Official Charts)	1
US Dance Airplay (Billboard)	23

===== Year-end charts =====
Chart (2007)	Position
Netherlands (Dutch Top 40)	99
UK Singles (OCC)	55

Chart (2008)	Position
Belgium (Ultratop 50 Flanders)	13
Belgium (Ultratop 50 Wallonia)	43
Hungary (Dance Top 40)	11
Hungary (Rádiós Top 40)	42
Netherlands (Dutch Top 40)	52
Netherlands (Single Top 100)	67

==== Certifications ====
Region	Certification	Certified units/sales
United Kingdom (BPI)	Gold	400,000^{‡}
^{‡} Sales+streaming figures based on certification alone.
