= Ring the Alarm =

Single by Beyoncé

from the album B'Day
- Released: September 10, 2006
- Recorded: April 2006
- Studio: Sony Music Studios (New York City, New York)
- Genre: R&B
- Length: 3:23
- Label: Columbia
- Composer: Kasseem Dean
- Lyricists: Beyoncé Knowles; Sean Garrett
- Producers: Swizz Beatz; Beyoncé; Sean Garrett

Beyoncé singles chronology
"Déjà Vu" (2006)	"Ring the Alarm" (2006)	"Irreplaceable" (2006)

Music video
- "Ring the Alarm" on YouTube

"Ring the Alarm" is a song recorded by American singer Beyoncé for her second studio album, B'Day (2006). It was written by Beyoncé, Kasseem "Swizz Beatz" Dean, and Sean Garrett. Columbia Records released "Ring the Alarm" as the second single from B'Day in the United States on September 10, 2006, while "Irreplaceable" (2006) was serviced as the album's second international and third US single. The song's development was motivated by Beyoncé's role in the Broadway musical adaptation Dreamgirls (2006). The cover art of "Ring the Alarm" proved controversial because Beyoncé used alligators during the photography session. PETA declared that Beyoncé's posing with a baby alligator was arguably abusive to an animal.

"Ring the Alarm" is an R&B song. Its introduction features a blaring siren, which sets an aggressive tone. The song's lyrics involve a woman who feels threatened, and is unwilling to allow another woman to profit from the protagonist's efforts to improve her lover's life. While some commended her willingness to take risks, others were polarized about her aggressive vocals. "Ring the Alarm" was nominated for Best Female R&B Vocal Performance at the 49th Annual Grammy Awards.

The single debuted at number 12 on the US Billboard Hot 100 chart, becoming Beyoncé's highest US debut at the time. It reached number 11 on the chart, becoming her first solo single to peak below the top 10. Its accompanying music video was inspired by the 1992 film Basic Instinct and was directed by Sophie Muller. It was filmed inside a cavernous hangar on the Brooklyn waterfront in New York City. The video garnered generally mixed reviews by critics, who universally thought that it was eccentric. Beyoncé promoted "Ring the Alarm" through various live performances on televised shows and awards ceremonies, including the 2006 MTV Video Music Awards. The song was included on her set list on the Beyoncé Experience (2007) in Los Angeles, her world tour I Am... World Tour. (2009–10), her On the Run Tour (2014) with Jay-Z, the Formation World Tour (2016), and her OTR II (2018) with Jay-Z again.

== Background and development ==
After six months of filming for the Broadway musical adaptation of Dreamgirls, Beyoncé was on vacation. Inspired by her role in the film, she said: "[When filming ended,] I had so many things bottled up, so many emotions, so many ideas". After contacting American songwriters and record producers Sean Garrett along with Rodney Jerkins, Rich Harrison, and Kasseem "Swizz Beatz" Dean, Beyoncé rented Sony Music Studios to begin working on her second solo album B'Day. Garret said: "I came to the studio and saw the zone...everybody in here is banging out. Rodney Jerkins had his session, Rich Harrison had his session going on...I started banging out some shit."

"Ring the Alarm" was written and produced by Beyoncé, Garrett and Swizz Beatz. Swizz Beatz stated: "['Ring the Alarm' is] just one of the many presents I gave [Beyoncé] for her B'Day. I have the most tracks on her album as a single producer". He told Billboard that "Ring the Alarm" was the first song he produced for B'Day and described it as reflecting a sense of urgency and competitiveness, which contributed to its aggressive sound. He added that he and Beyoncé "went back and forth" on the track extensively in order to make it sound "as raw as possible".

"Ring the Alarm" was co-arranged by Beyoncé and recorded in the same studio. She said about her collaboration with Swizz Beatz, "I love working with Swizz. He's challenging. His beats are so complex it's hard to find a melody. But ['Ring the Alarm'] just clicked".

== Composition ==
According to the sheet music published by EMI Music Publishing, it is composed in the key of A minor but changes to E major in the bridge and changes to A minor, and set in common time at a moderately slow tempo of 85 beats per minute. The instrumentation of "Ring the Alarm" includes drums, clattering percussion instrument, treble synthesizers, and bass instrument. It also makes use of a slapping backbeat, an air horn, titanic handclaps, plonks, and breathing noises. A blaring siren is used as the song's introductory sound, setting an aggressive tone, which is augmented by Beyoncé's throaty mezzo-soprano growl. Tim Finney of Pitchfork described her vocals as "thrillingly sharp with anxiety and paranoia", and Tom Breihan of The Village Voice commented that she sings with "a frantic intensity". Beyoncé's vocals range from the note of A_{3} to F_{5}. Her strong shout vocal styling is meshed with the grooves, and enhanced with echo and shimmer, which overlap with one another, creating a neo-warm vibe.

"Ring the Alarm"
A sample of "Ring the Alarm", demonstrating the blaring siren, the slapping backbeat, the pounding bass, and the titanic handclaps, which all complement the angry and aggressive vocals of Beyoncé

Beyoncé commented on the song, "It's energetic, aggressive and filled with hard beats". She explained that the album was completed in three weeks, which is the reason most of the record, including "Ring the Alarm" sounds aggressive. She further clarified that she did not intend to write an angry song, "Swizz's ['Ring the Alarm'] had that tough vibe, like the guy had cheated, and I wanted to write something honest. If you're in a relationship, even if the man's cheating and you end up not wanting him, the thought of another woman benefiting from the lessons you taught him." "Ring the Alarm" features Beyoncé as the female protagonist impersonating a threatened woman involved in a love triangle. She is unwilling to allow another woman to profit from all the efforts she put on to make her lover a better man. Frances Romero of Time magazine noted that Beyoncé's anger is due to her man's wandering eye, her desire to leave, and the thought of having to give him up to some unworthy woman.

Tamara Coniff of Billboard magazine noted that the verses of "Ring the Alarm" resemble those of Aretha Franklin's songs. Tom Breihan commented that Beyoncé "[wails] with force and purpose on the verses". As the song opens, she tells her lover, "I can't let you go", and that she will not allow another woman to take everything she owns, including the chinchilla coats and the house on the coast. Beyoncé screams the refrain—"Ring the alarm, I've been doin[g] this too long / But I'll be damned if I see another chick on your arm"—"through a thick fog of distortion", as noted by Jody Rosen of Entertainment Weekly. Sarah Rodman of The Boston Globe added that she chants the lines with grit and urgency, while Breihan wrote that she sings them "with a frantic intensity". Beyoncé later declares that her relationship is "not the picture perfect movie everyone would assume".

== Release ==
"I want to personally respond to the report on Vibe.com about my next single, 'Ring The Alarm.' I am very proud of this song and I believe the video is one of the best I have ever done. I cannot wait for my fans to see it. I always believed this would be a powerful song. My thoughts about releasing 'Green Light' (2007) and 'Get Me Bodied' was to go first to the international market, but the vibrancy of 'Ring The Alarm' is something I wanted the whole world to see and hear right now. 'Green Light' and 'Get Me Bodied' are definite single contenders, but right now it's all about 'Ring The Alarm.'"

— Beyoncé Knowles on the release on "Ring the Alarm".

In June 2006, Beyoncé invited Tamara Coniff of Billboard to a New York recording studio where she played "Ring the Alarm" and "Freakum Dress" (2006) for the prospect of the next US single, and she also had plans for "Green Light" (2007) and "Get Me Bodied" (2007) to hit international markets. However, she ultimately opted for "Ring the Alarm" to be released as the second single of the album in the United States, following "Déjà Vu" (2006). On September 10, 2006, it was added to US urban contemporary radio playlists. A two-track CD single was released on October 3, 2006, and a five-track remix CD was later made available on October 17, 2006. Beyoncé approached English production team Freemasons to remix "Ring the Alarm". A club-oriented remix was produced and included on the band's debut studio album Shakedown (2007).

== Controversies ==
The lyrics of "Ring the Alarm" were rumored to be about singer Rihanna's relationship with rapper Jay-Z. According to media speculation, Beyoncé, Rihanna and Jay-Z were part of a love triangle in 2006. It was rumored that Jay-Z had always been faithful to Beyoncé until he met Rihanna, whose popularity grew considerably during that year. She tempted Jay-Z to live a romantic relationship with her while he was still with Beyoncé. As commented by Tom Breihan of The Village Voice, Beyoncé took advantage of "[people's] sympathy and unleash[ed] a burst of public rage in the form of ['Ring the Alarm']". In an interview for Seventeen magazine, she however clarified that the lyrics had no connection with Rihanna, before adding that she was unaware of the rumors that had been circulating. Concerned that someone was trying to sabotage Beyoncé's second studio album, Beyoncé's father and manager, Mathew Knowles, released an official statement:

It is apparent that there is a consistent plan by some to create chaos around Beyoncé's B'Day album release on September 4 in the US. First, it was a petition against the single, 'Déjà Vu', then a rumor regarding conflict between Beyoncé and Rihanna, seizures caused by the 'Ring the Alarm' video, putting out a single to compete with LeToya's album and now to add to all the ridiculous rumors, is my plan to postpone the release of her 'B'Day' album. What will be next? Beyoncé's cut off all her hair? Dyed it green? Maybe she's singing the songs in reverse with some hidden subliminal message!

The cover art of "Ring the Alarm", caused controversy because alligators were used during the photography session. Beyoncé affirmed that using the animal, and taping their mouths shut, was her idea. People for the Ethical Treatment of Animals (PETA), which had previously confronted her after she used furs for her fashion line's clothing design, contacted a biologist who wrote a letter to Beyoncé, "As a specialist in reptile biology and welfare, I'm concerned about your posing with a terrified baby alligator for your new album cover. Humans and alligators are not natural bedfellows, and the two should not mix at events such as photo shoots. In my view, doing so is arguably abusive to an animal."

== Critical reception ==
"Ring the Alarm" received polarized responses from contemporary music critics, who noted that it was a marked departure from Beyoncé's previous material. Eb Haynes of AllHipHop wrote that the song is "emotionally high-powered. The Boston Globe's Sarah Rodman noted that it finds Beyoncé in "full hell-hath-no-fury mode", singing with grit and urgency that feel genuine. A critic of Billboard magazine viewed "Ring the Alarm" as a memorable release even though he wrote that it is not as good as Beyoncé's 2003 single "Crazy in Love". He praised her distorted vocals and the "ranting assault of a lyric", which she uses to convince her love interest. Jody Rosen of Entertainment Weekly called "Ring the Alarm" torrid, and wrote that Beyoncé "sounds positively horrified by the prospect of relinquishing the luxury goodies her boyfriend has bought her". Brian Hiatt of Rolling Stone stated that she sings with "enough frantic, quavering intensity to make you believe she really is crazy in love". Marcos Chin of Vibe magazine described "Ring the Alarm" as "both a sexual invitation and a threat". Darryl Sterdan of Jam! described "Ring the Alarm" as a "shrill tantrum of green-eyed monsterdom", and Kelefa Sanneh of The New York Times described it as a "canny display of emotional vulnerability". Tom Breihan of The Village Voice commented that "Ring the Alarm" may become Beyoncé's "You Oughta Know".

Spence D. of IGN Music commented that the best examples of Beyoncé vocal stylings come on "Ring The Alarm", adding that it is one of the few tracks on the album where she goes for a throaty growl. Sal Cinquemani of Slant Magazine wrote that it was a bold choice for a single Dave de Sylvi of Sputnikmusic noted that "Ring the Alarm" was a brave choice for a single, called it "angry and lyrically incendiary", and noted that Swizz Beatz's beats are "unusually intricate". Norman Meyers of Prefix Magazine noted that the song is evidence of Beyoncé's willingness to take chances. Calling "Ring the Alarm" a "bunny-boiling bonanza" and a "killer club track", Rach Read of TeenToday wrote that it is a definite highlight and that "it's great to see an artist at the top of her game prepared to take risks with a track as unhinged as this." Chris Richards of The Washington Post defined Beyoncé's character in the song as a "jealousy-crazed ex", and expressed his disappointment that it could not manage a "more convincing refrain". Andy Kellman of Allmusic called it "an angered, atonal, and out-of-character song". Tim Finney of Pitchfork Media wrote, "the siren-assisted caterwaul of second single 'Ring the Alarm' sounds genuinely (and marvelously) incoherent." Bernard Zuel of The Sydney Morning Herald described "Ring the Alarm" as a "posturing and eventually annoying" track.

== Accolades ==
Vibe ranked "Ring the Alarm" at number forty-eight on its list of the Top 60 Songs of 2006, complimenting the vocal distortion and the way Beyoncé shouts on the chorus and the hook. Frances Romero of Time listed "Ring the Alarm" at number nine on her list of the Top 10 Angry Breakup Songs of the 2000s decade, writing: "Critics had mixed feelings about the song ... In the end, what it does show is that Beyoncé will have her way." Staff members of Pitchfork ranked the song on their list of The Top 100 Tracks of 2006 at number eighty-five. The song was nominated for Best Female R&B Vocal Performance at the 49th Annual Grammy Awards (2007) but lost to Mary J. Blige's song "Be Without You" (2005). Jody Rosen from The New Yorker credited the jarring timbral and tonal variations on the song for giving a new musical sound that didn't exist in the world before Beyoncé. He further wrote, "If they sound 'normal' now, it's because Beyoncé, and her many followers, have retrained our ears." On their ranking of the best singles of aughts, Slant Magazine included "Ring the Alarm" at number two-hundred-and-twenty-six.

== Commercial performance ==
For the week ending September 23, 2006, "Ring the Alarm" debuted at number twelve on the US Billboard Hot 100, following its entry at number seven on the US Hot Digital Songs, selling around 56,000 digital downloads. It was the highest debut that week in the United States, and was the highest debuting song of Beyoncé's career until "Formation" and "Sorry" debuted at numbers ten and eleven in May 2016, and eventually bested when "Texas Hold 'Em" debuted at number two in February 2024. The song peaked at number eleven on the Hot 100 chart issue dated September 30, 2006, and was Beyoncé's lowest peaking single until "Get Me Bodied", which peaked at number sixty-eight. Several weeks after leaving the Hot 100 chart, "Ring the Alarm" re-entered it for the week ending January 13, 2007, at number eighty-one; it remained on the chart for fourteen non-consecutive weeks.

"Ring the Alarm" was more successful on the US Billboard component charts. It topped the Dance Club Songs, Hot R&B/Hip-Hop Singles Sales and Hot 100 Singles Sales chart, and reached number three on the Hot R&B/Hip-Hop Songs. The song additionally charted at number twenty-one on the US Rhythmic and at number nineteen on the US Pop 100. Though not released outside the United States, "Ring the Alarm" charted at number fifty-six on January 15, 2007, in Sweden.

== Music video ==
The music video for "Ring the Alarm" was the second video of Beyoncé's to be directed by Sophie Muller, who worked on "Déjà Vu". The video was filmed inside a cavernous hangar located on the waterfront in Brooklyn, New York City. It remakes a scene from the film Basic Instinct (1992), referred to by Natalie More of In These Times as an infamous scene. Beyoncé wears a white skirt and turtleneck to emulate Sharon Stone. She told Elysa Gardner of USA Today that she considered the video to be a movie scene; "I put six months aside, worked with a coach for two months. And that carried through to my music. I treated the video for 'Ring the Alarm' like a movie scene. I was thinking, 'I've got to make my acting coach proud." The video premiered at Yahoo! Music on August 16, 2006 and was released to US iTunes Store on November 21, 2006. It debuted on MTV's Total Request Live at number ten on August 22, 2006, reached number one, and remained on the show for 35 days until it was replaced by the music video for "Irreplaceable" (2006). The video credited then-15-year-old dancer Teyana Taylor as the choreographer.

Beyoncé struggling against guards in riot gear during the video

The video starts with Beyoncé lying on a table, lit with a flashing bright red light. While a siren is blaring, she half-stands and sings while dancing on the table. She proceeds to an interrogation room similar to the one in the film Basic Instinct. Beyoncé sings the first verse in a house with a seashore backdrop. She wants to escape, and struggles with masked and uniformed guards in a hallway. She is then returned to the interrogation room. In between cuts, she sings in a corner of a room, is seen reflected in a mirror while screaming, and among a group of reporters. As the song closes, Beyoncé is shown crying. The video ends with a close-up view of Beyoncé putting on red lipstick. The scene shows only her lips.

The music video gained mostly mixed reviews from critics. Andy Kellman of AllMusic wrote that it "invited all kinds of perplexed analysis". Jose Antonio Vargas of The Washington Post described Beyoncé's persona as a "ranting, angry woman". Elizabeth Goodman of Rolling Stone speculated that the use of guards in riot gear is a reference to Alias. Tom Breihan of The Village Voice described the clip as a "quick-and-dirty" video and a "fast montage of disconnected and disconnecting images". Blogger Roger Friedman of Fox News called it a "bizarre video depicting a wildly angry and unappealing Beyoncé telling off someone (maybe Jay-Z?) for cheating as if she were an enraged guest on Maury Povich." The staff members of Pitchfork Media included the music video at number twenty-one on the list of Top 25 Music Videos of 2006. Ryan Dombal further wrote that it was "Almost as good as Basic Instinct 2: Risk Addiction". In 2013, John Boone and Jennifer Cady of E! Online placed the video at number six on their list of Beyoncé's ten best music videos.

== Live performances ==
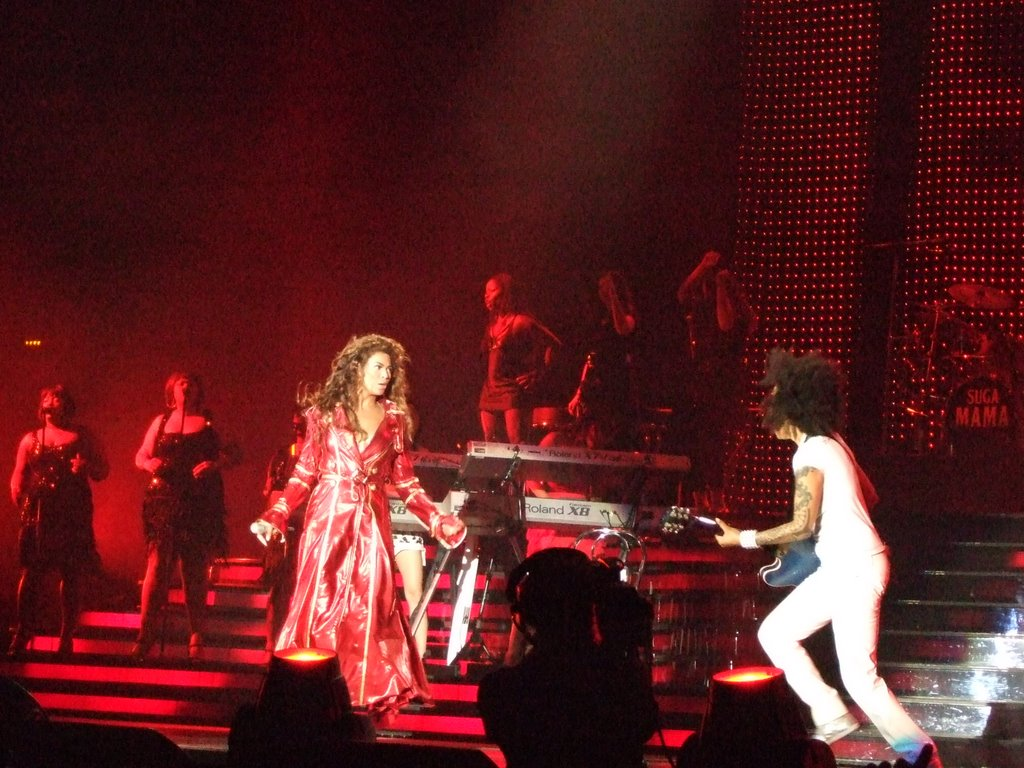
Beyoncé performing "Ring the Alarm" on The Beyoncé Experience

Beyoncé performed "Ring the Alarm" at the 2006 MTV Video Music Awards on August 31, 2006, wearing a flowing trench coat, a corset and hotpants. The performance referenced Janet Jackson's "Rhythm Nation" routine. James Montgomery of MTV News commented that as Beyoncé sang, she "...stripped and stalked." Jocelyn Vena of the same publication, wrote that she had a "frantic performance" of the song along with a "fiercely choreographed breakdown" at the end. Erika Ramirez of Billboard magazine put the performance at number five on her list of "Beyonce's 5 Biggest TV Performances" saying that Beyoncé "kill[ed]" the live performance. She later performed the song on the American morning news and talk show, Good Morning America. "Ring the Alarm" was included on Beyoncé's set list for her The Beyoncé Experience concert in Los Angeles, and I Am... World Tour venues.

During a performance of "Ring the Alarm" in Orlando, Florida on July 26, 2007, Beyoncé fell down a flight of stairs on stage and was videoed by several fans. She told her audience that it "hurt so bad" and requested, "Don't put [the footage] on YouTube." However, the next morning, several clips of Beyoncé's fall were available on YouTube, and reported in the media. The videos were quickly removed from YouTube because users had transgressed the website's terms of use." A representative from YouTube said that users posting their footage of the incident were guilty of infringement because "even if [they] took the video [themselves], the performer controls the right to use his/her image in a video, the songwriter owns the rights to the song being performed and sometimes the venue prohibits filming without permission." After being removed, clips of Beyoncé's fall were later reposted on YouTube and other video-sharing sites like eBaum's World and Dailymotion. Jay-Z later stated on radio that even though Beyoncé is "...a great performer who's on point 99 percent of the time, she's still human."

Beyoncé performed "Ring the Alarm" on August 5, 2007, at Madison Square Garden in Manhattan, wearing a long red overcoat. Jon Pareles of The New York Times praised her performance, stating: "Beyoncé needs no distractions from her singing, which can be airy or brassy, tearful or vicious, rapid-fire with staccato syllables or sustained in curlicued melismas. But she was in constant motion, strutting in costumes." In Los Angeles, Beyoncé performed song, dressed in a long red overcoat. She was accompanied by several backup dancers and live instrumentation. When she sang "Ring the Alarm" in Sunrise, Florida on June 29, 2009, Beyoncé was wearing a glittery gold leotard. Animated graphics of turntables, faders and other club equipment were projected behind her, the dancers and the musicians. Beyoncé was accompanied by two drummers, two keyboardists, a percussionist, a horn section, three backup vocalists and a lead guitarist. "Ring the Alarm" was included on her 2007 live album The Beyoncé Experience Live.

"Ring the Alarm" was also featured in several of Beyoncé's later concert tours. It was included in the setlist of the On the Run Tour (2014), a collaborative stadium tour with Jay-Z, where Beyoncé performed a shortened version during the third segment. Most recently, the song was also part of The Formation World Tour (2016) and On the Run II Tour (2018).

== Formats and track listings ==
- US CD single and 12-inch vinyl
1. "Ring the Alarm" – 3:26
2. "Ring the Alarm" (instrumental) – 3:25
- US remix CD single
1. "Ring the Alarm" (Karmatronic Remix) – 3:21
2. "Ring the Alarm" (Migtight Remix) – 3:21
3. "Ring the Alarm" (Tranzformas Remix) – 4:14
4. "Ring the Alarm" (Jazze Pha Remix) – 3:48
5. "Ring the Alarm" (Grizz Remix) – 3:32
- US Dance Mixes EP
1. "Ring the Alarm" (Freemasons Club Mix) – 8:33
2. "Ring the Alarm" (Karmatronic Remix) – 3:19
3. "Ring the Alarm" (Migtight Remix) – 3:19
- US Urban Mixes EP
1. "Ring the Alarm" (Tranzformas Remix) (feat. Collie Buddz) – 4:12
2. "Ring the Alarm" (Jazze Pha Remix) – 3:47
3. "Ring the Alarm" (Grizz Remix) – 3:32
- Spanglish Mix
1. "Ring the Alarm" (Spanglish Mix) - 3:24

== Credits and personnel ==
- Beyoncé Knowles – vocals, production, writing, executive production
- Mathew Knowles – executive production, management, A&R
- Jim Caruana – recording
- Rob Kinelski – recording assistance
- Jason Goldstein – mixing
- Swizz Beatz – mixing, production, writing
- Sean Garrett – production, writing
- Steve Tolle – mixing assistance
- Brian Gardner – mastering
- Max Gousse – A&R

== Charts ==
=== Weekly charts ===
Chart (2006–2007)	Peak position
Canada CHR/Top 40 (Billboard)	38
CIS Airplay (TopHit)	62
Global Dance Songs (Billboard)	16
Japan (Oricon)	75
Russia Airplay (TopHit)	100
Sweden (Sverigetopplistan)	56
US Billboard Hot 100	11
US Dance Club Songs (Billboard)	1
US Hot R&B/Hip-Hop Songs (Billboard)	3
US Pop 100 (Billboard)	19
US Rhythmic Airplay (Billboard)	21

=== Year-end charts ===
Chart (2006)	Position
US Hot R&B/Hip Hop Songs (Billboard)	55

Chart (2007)	Position
US Dance Club Play (Billboard)	32

=== Decade-end charts ===
Chart (2000–2009)	Position
US Dance Club Play (Billboard)	27

== Certifications ==
Region	Certification	Certified units/sales
United States (RIAA)	Platinum	1,000,000^{‡}
United States (RIAA) Mastertone	Gold	500,000^{*}
^{*} Sales figures based on certification alone.^{‡} Sales+streaming figures based on certification alone.

== Release history ==
Release dates and formats for "Ring the Alarm"
Region	Date	Format(s)	Label(s)	Ref.
United States	September 10, 2006	Urban contemporary radio	Columbia; Music World	
United States	September 12, 2006	Contemporary hit radio; rhythmic contemporary radio	Columbia; Music World	
United States	October 3, 2006	12-inch vinyl; CD	Columbia; Music World	
United States	October 17, 2006	Maxi CD	Columbia; Music World	
United States	October 31, 2006	Digital download: (Dance Mixes; Urban Mixes)	Columbia; Music World	

== See also ==
- List of number-one dance singles of 2006 (U.S.)

== In popular culture ==
- "Ring the Alarm" has featured in the third series premiere of popular UK teen drama Skins.
