= Lee Curtis and the All-Stars =

British rock band (1961–1967)

Background information
- Origin: Liverpool, England
- Genres: Rock and roll, beat
- Years active: 1961–1967
- Label: Decca
- Past members: see Personnel

Lee Curtis and the All-Stars were an English beat group from Liverpool. They were contemporaries and briefly local rivals of the Beatles in the early 1960s. Led by Peter Flannery, who used the stage name Lee Curtis, other group members included Pete Best, Wayne Bickerton and Tony Waddington.

== Career ==
Their origins lay in the Detours, a group formed in 1961 by school friends in Liverpool including lead singer Peter Flannery, who adopted a stage name derived from the American singer Curtis Lee. Although they performed regularly in the Liverpool and North Wales areas, Lee Curtis and the Detours split up after a few months. Flannery and his brother and manager Joe, who had previously worked as a singer with the Joe Loss Orchestra, decided to form a new group, to be called Lee Curtis and the All-Stars.

In mid-1962 they recruited band members from other local groups. The original members were Frank Bowen (lead guitar), Tony Waddington (rhythm guitar), Wayne Bickerton (bass), and Bernie Rogers (drums). However, when Pete Best was sacked by the Beatles, the Flannery brothers – apparently encouraged by the Beatles' manager Brian Epstein – decided to dispense with Rogers and install Best as the group's drummer. They also occasionally performed with singer Beryl Marsden. By the end of 1962, the group were one of the most successful in the area, and placed second in the Mersey Beat annual poll, behind the Beatles but ahead of Gerry and the Pacemakers, the Searchers, and other groups who later became nationally and internationally renowned. Lee Curtis and the All-Stars were signed by Decca Records, and released two singles in early 1963, "Little Girl" and "Let's Stomp". However, neither made the charts, and in mid 1963 the rest of the band decided to split from Curtis to form The Original All-Stars. That group later became the Pete Best Four, and several years later Bickerton and Waddington moved on to become the writers and producers behind The Rubettes.

Curtis formed a new version of the All-Stars in 1963, with Paul Pilnick (lead guitar), George "Porky" Peckham (rhythm guitar – in later years a renowned record cutting engineer), Dave "Mushy" Cooper (bass), and Don Alcyd (drums). The new line-up recorded a single "I've Got My Eyes On You", contributed two tracks to the Decca album, Live at the Cavern, and played in clubs in Hamburg, but split up soon afterwards. However, Curtis continued to build up his popularity on the club circuit in Germany, and had a year-long residency at the Star-Club. He also recorded regularly in Germany, although the line-up of his backing group, the All-Stars, changed repeatedly.

== Lee Curtis ==
Lee Curtis
- Also known as: Lee Curtis
- Born: Peter Flannery; 31 October 1939; Walton, Liverpool, England, UK
- Died: 12 October 2023 (aged 83) Southport, England, UK
- Genres: rock and roll, beat
- Occupation: Musician
- Years active: 1961–1967
- Formerly of: Lee Curtis and the All-Stars

Peter Flannery (born 31 October 1939, Walton, Liverpool – died 12 October 2023, Southport), who used the stage name Lee Curtis, was an English rock and roll singer, who fronted Lee Curtis and the All-Stars.

=== Career ===
Flannery fronted the band from 1961 to 1967. Towards the end of 1967, he was a passenger in a car which crashed while he was on the way to a performance in Germany, and he suffered head injuries. After a few further performances, he decided to leave the music business and returned home to Liverpool.

=== Later life and death ===
In later years, Lee Curtis worked as a croupier and at the Ford motor works at Halewood, occasionally returning to live performance in Liverpool and Germany. In 2007 he headlined a well attended live music event as Lee Curtis and The Bonds in Cuxhaven, Germany, for the launch of the book We Got Our Kicks in Cux'66 by Jens-Christian Mangels and Ralf Froehlich. He later lived in Southport. Curtis died peacefully in Southport on 12 October 2023, nineteen days before his 84th birthday.

== Members ==
- Lee Curtis
- Frank Bowen
- Tony Waddington
- Wayne Bickerton
- Bernie Rogers
- Pete Best
- Paul Pilnick
- George Peckham
- Dave "Mushy" Cooper
- Don Alcyd
- Mike Cummins
- Simon Hind
- Mike Bankes
- Joe Walsh
- Bob Garner
- Dave McShane
- Chris Dennis
- Franz "Piggy" Jarnach
- Steve Doyle
- Dave Watt
- Ulf Krueger
- Jimmy Cave
- Billy Good
- Arty Davies
- Ian Love
- Keith Roberts
- Bernie Morley
