= When You Touch Me =

Single by Freemasons featuring Katherine Ellis

from the album Shakedown, Unmixed and Shakedown 2
- Released: 23 June 2008
- Recorded: London, UK
- Genre: Dance
- Length: 4:15
- Songwriter(s): Russell Small, James Wiltshire, Katherine Ellis
- Producer(s): Freemasons

Freemasons singles chronology
"Uninvited" (2007)	"When You Touch Me" (2008)	"If" (2009)

Katherine Ellis singles chronology
"Stiletto Strutt" (2008)	"When You Touch Me" (2008)	"Control" (2009)

Music video
- "When You Touch Me" on YouTube

"When You Touch Me" is a song by English dance band Freemasons. It was released as the 6th single from their second studio album Unmixed and features vocals from English dance music vocalist and songwriter Katherine Ellis.

== Music video ==
The music video was inspired by the "Rich Man's Frug" scene from the 1969 musical film Sweet Charity. Although Katherine Ellis sings lead vocals in the song, she is not featured in the video and instead features dancer Stephanie Fitzpatrick miming over the track and dancing as the lead in the video.

== Track listing ==
"When You Touch Me"
No.	Title	Length
1.	"When You Touch Me" (Radio Edit)	3:15
2.	"When You Touch Me" (Club Mix)	3:10
3.	"When You Touch Me" (Original Club Mix)	6:07
4.	"When You Touch Me" (Bart B More Vocal Mix)	6:04
5.	"When You Touch Me" (Jean Maxwell Remix)	6:36
6.	"When You Touch Me" (Barrat & Falconi Remix)	8:01
7.	"When You Touch Me" (Bart B More Secured Dub)	5:44
8.	"When You Touch Me" (Jean Maxwell Dub)	6:40
9.	"When You Touch Me" (Barrat & Falconi Dub)	7:58
10.	"When You Touch Me" (Instrumental)	3:15
11.	"When You Touch Me" (Accapella)	2:57

== Charts ==
Chart (2008)	Peak position
Belgium (Ultratop 50 Flanders)	28
Belgium (Ultratip Bubbling Under Wallonia)	3
Hungary (Dance Top 40)	20
Hungary (Rádiós Top 40)	34
Netherlands (Dutch Top 40)	30
UK Singles (The Official Charts Company)	23
