= Pearly Gates (singer) =

American singer

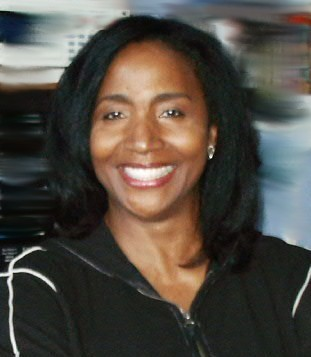
- Billups in 2007

Background information
- Born: Viola Billups; July 4, 1946 (age 80)
- Origin: Alabama, United States
- Genres: disco, Dance-pop, soul
- Occupation: Singer
- Instrument: Vocals
- Years active: 1960s–present
- Labels: Polydor Records, RCA Records, Bronze Records, Funkin' Marvellous, Nightmare, Centre City Records

Viola Billups (born July 4, 1946), known by her stage name Pearly Gates, is an American disco and soul singer and member of girl group The Flirtations.

== Biography ==
Billups was born in Alabama in 1946. She joined The Flirtations with sisters Earnestine Pearce and Betty Pearce in 1964 and moved with the group to London, England in 1968 where their music was popular. Pearly left the group in 1973 and released her first single "Sad Old Shadow", written by Lynsey De Paul and Don Gould on Polydor Records under the nickname "Vie".< She changed her performing name to "Pearly Gates" in 1974 for her second single "Johnny and the Jukebox". In New Zealand, "Sad Old Shadow" was released in 1974 and credited to "Pearly Gates".

Several more singles followed in the late 70s on RCA Records and Bronze Records and she remained a popular artist on TV, being a regular performer on the Cliff Richard show as well as featuring in all eight episodes of the TV variety show, Hi Summer. In 1979, she completed her first disco album Fading into the Night with producer Ian Levine, although the album was supposed to have been released by American singer Cobie Jones who ultimately did not make it to the sessions. The album, however, became a victim of the disco backlash and was not released until 16 years later. The title track was released as a single in 1987.

In 1985, she enjoyed a Hi-NRG hit with the song "Action" The video starred Poseur of the year 1986 Dennis Brody on its re-release, and also toured with Madeline Bell and Katie Kissoon, performing with James Last Orchestra. Two of her unreleased disco tracks were released on 12" singles in Levine's Nightmare Gold series in 1987. In 1995, Levine recorded six new tracks with her (including a remake of "Action" and released them along with her lost 1979 album on the CD The Best of Pearly Gates. Pearly continues to perform regularly with The Flirtations who remain popular on the Northern Soul scene. She also ran her own management company, Viemanagement, working with boy band Dyyce and singer Anousha. In 2007, she recorded four new tracks – two solo and two with The Flirtations – for Ian Levine's Centre City Records releases Northern Soul 2007 and Disco 2008. 2008 saw her record two retro-style tracks with Scandinavian label Night Dance Records, eventually evolving into a full album project On a Winning Streak, released March 11, 2010, a 20-track compilation of new recordings, including her 2009 single "Roulette" by The Flirtations; her 3 recordings for Centre City Records; 4 previously unreleased 1977 recordings, produced by H. B. Barnum; and a Barry Gibb song, "Broken Bottles", written by the Barry, Robin & Maurice Gibb, the song was originally recorded as a demo for Dionne Warwick for her 1982 album Heartbreaker but was not used. The package also included a 12-track DVD. One of the tracks "Stop for Love" was premièred on YouTube, in October 2009, featuring bisexual adult film icon Zeb Atlas (with whom Gates also recorded a cover version of Diana Ross' 1975 #1 disco hit, Love Hangover) and gay icon Dave 'Muscles' Jenkins as the singer's love interest – a video that attracted a 100,000 views over the next six months. It was finally released in two different mixes as a single on 1 March 2011.

== Albums ==
- The Best of Pearly Gates (Hot Productions, 1995)
- On a Winning Streak (Night Dance Records, 2010)

== Singles ==
- "Sad Old Shadow" / "Stay" (as Vie – Polydor, 1973)
- "Johnny and the Jukebox" / "They Were Good Times" (Polydor, 1974)
- "Make It My Business to Get You Boy" / You're the One for Me" (RCA, 1975)
- "Burning Love" (Bronze, 1978)
- "Fandango Dancing" / "Dancing on a Dream" (Bronze, 1979)
- "Action" (Funkin' Marvellous, 1985)
- "Sweet (Like Honey To a Bee)" / "Action" (Funkin' Marvellous, 1985)
- "Third Time Lucky" (Funkin' Marvellous, 1986)
- "No Two Ways About It" (Nightmare Gold, 1987)
- "Fading into the Night" (Nightmare Gold, 1987)
- "One Less Bell to Answer" / "The Race Is On" (Nightmare Records, 1989)
- "One Time Too Many" / "Stop for Love" (Night Dance Records, 2009)
