= Rain Down Love =

Single by Freemasons featuring Siedah Garrett

from the album Shakedown
- Released: 15 January 2007
- Recorded: London, UK
- Genre: Disco house
- Songwriter(s): Siedah Garrett; Russell Small; James Wiltshire; Neil Cowley
- Producer(s): James Wiltshire; Russell Small

Freemasons singles chronology
"Watchin'" (2006)	"Rain Down Love" (2007)	"Nothing but a Heartache" (2007)

Siedah Garrett singles chronology
"What I Know" (2003)	"Rain Down Love" (2007)	"I Want Your Soul" (2007)

"Rain Down Love" is a song by English dance band Freemasons. It was released as the third single from their second studio album Unmixed and features vocals from the American singer-songwriter Siedah Garrett. The music video for this song is almost identical to Daft Punk single "Around the World".

== Track listing ==
"Rain Down Love"
No.	Title	Length
1.	"Rain Down Love" (Walken Edit)	3:10
2.	"Rain Down Love" (Walken Extended Mix)	4:37
3.	"Rain Down Love" (2007 Club Mix)	7:09
4.	"Rain Down Love" (2007 Dub)	4:52
5.	"Rain Down Love" (2007 Ecl)	4:24
6.	"Rain Down Love" (Original Club Mix)	4:52
7.	"Rain Down Love" (Original Dub)	4:24
8.	"Rain Down Love" (Phunkk Mob Remix)	4:52
9.	"Rain Down Love" (Phunkk Mobb Dub)	4:24

Other Version

1. "Rain Down Love" 2014 (Extended) [feat. Siedah Garrett] - 7:58

== Charts ==
Chart (2007)	Peak position
Australia (ARIA Charts)	96
Belgium (Ultratop 50 Flanders)	20
Belgium (Ultratip Bubbling Under Wallonia)	13
Finland (Suomen virallinen lista)	8
Netherlands (Single Top 100)	76
UK Singles (The Official Charts Company)	12
UK Dance (OCC)	4
UK Indie (OCC)	1
