= Simon Beta =

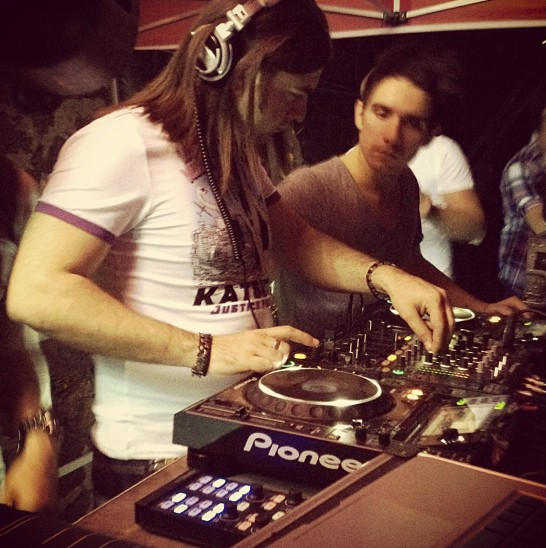
- Simon Beta at the Levanto With Night Festival in 2012

Background information
- Birth name: Simone Della Zoppa
- Also known as: Simon Beta, Doctors in Florence, Rehnoir, SIB606, Jack Empire, N-Quisitor
- Born: 7 June 1982 (age 42)
- Origin: La Spezia, Italy
- Genres: House, electronic, hardstyle, electro house, tech house
- Occupation(s): Producer, DJ
- Instrument: Turntables
- Years active: 1997–present
- Labels: Cr2 Records; Flamingo Recordings
- Website: www.simonbeta.net

Simon Beta (born Simone Della Zoppa; 6 July 1982) is an Italian house music DJ, producer and remixer, active since 1997 who has used many aliases (Simon Beta, Furious F*ckerz, Doctors in Florence, Rehnoir, Jack Empire, Sexycools and more).

Some of his most popular recent songs include two collaborations with Dutch DJ Marco V ("Lotus" and "Limitess"), both released by Flamingo Recordings (Fedde Le Grand's label), and "Where My Heart Lives" released on the British label Cr2 featuring Amanda Wilson.

He has also remixed songs by other artists including Corona, David Jones, and Thomas Newson.

In 2010, Beta founded a group called Doctors in Florence with Luca Palmieri and Fabio Andromda and decided to dedicate himself to this new project.

After the dissolution of Doctors in Florence in 2014, Beta started to use his first name Simon Beta and now works as a duo with his partner Luca Palmieri (who was also in Doctors in Florence, and since 2014 has been using the alias Mike Lucas).

In 2017, Beta and Lucas created a new project called Sexycools, producing some new versions of hits of the '90s such as "The Rhythm of the Night" and "Baby Baby" by Corona (released with Simon from Deep Divas), "Sunshine and Happiness" (Nerio's Dubwork), and "Uh La La La" (Alexia).

In 2019, Beta released a single through Sony Music featuring Ne-Yo, titled "U R the One". In 2020, a new single called "Lolita" with Snoop Dogg and "Coming Home" were released on Sony Music.

== Discography ==
=== Singles ===
- 2019-01-31 Sexycools & Stefy De Cicco "Coming Home" [Sony Music]
- 2020-01-06 Mike Lucas & Simon Beta Feat Snoop Dogg "Lolita" [Sony Music]
- 2019-02-22 Sexycools & Audiosonic Feat. Ne-Yo "U R The One" [Sony Music]
- 2019-01-11 Deep Divas & Sexycools "Baby Baby" [Dance & Love Records]
- 2019-01-11 Deep Divas & Sexycools "The Rhythm Of The Night" [Dance & Love Records]
- 2018-06-08 Deep Divas & Sexycools Feat. Alexia "Uh La La La" [Zyx Records]
- 2018-04-27 Sexycools & Audiosonic "Sunshine And Happiness" [Blanco Y Negro]
- 2015-10-16 Arda Diri, Mike Lucas & Simon Beta "Soul Night" [Playbox Music]
- 2015-06-01 Simon Beta, Christopher Ank, Gerard Kidman, Mike Lucas "Thor" [Bonerizing Records]
- 2015-03-03 Simon Beta & Mike Lucas "Khomm" [Virus T Studio Records]
- 2014-02-17 Mike Lucas & Simon Beta Feat. Amanda Wilson "Where My Heart Lives" [Cr2 Records]
- 2014-02-03 Simon Beta & Mike Lucas "Ready" [Virus T Studio Records]
- 2013-08-15 Billy Sizemore & Rehnoir "Wobble 2X" [Consistent Recordings]
- 2013-04-26 Deep Divas & Rehnoir "Phaze" [BitPull Recordings]
- 2013-04-15 Marco V & Doctors In Florence Feat. Jade Ross "Lotus(Limitless)" [Flamingo Recordings]
- 2012-10-29 Marco V & Doctors In Florence "Lotus" [Flamingo Recordings]
- 2012-12-20 Doctors In Florence "Blackbeat" [Consistent Records]
- 2011-01-12 Doctors In Florence "Heart Vibrations" [Adaptor Recordings]
- 2011-04-21 Doctors In Florence "Back 2 Life" [Adaptor Recordings]
- 2011-03-24 Doctors In Florence "Kindred Spirit" [Adaptor Recordings]
- 2010 Dj Garath & Simon Beta "Evil"
- 2010 Dj Rehnoir & Fabio Andromeda Meets Luca Palmieri "God Save The Rhythm"
- 2010-03-06 Dj Rehnoir & Fabio Andromeda "Toboga"
- 2010 Jimmy The Sound Vs Simon Beta "Vanity Of Insanity"
- 2009 Dj Garath & Simon Beta "Phobia"
- 2009-06-29 - Fabio Andromeda & Simon Beta "Microwave" [Electroburn Records]
- 2009 Gladiator & The Furious Fuckerz "Black Straight" [Ipnotika Records]
- 2009 Maurizio Ferrari & The Furious Fuckerz "Snap" [Ipnotika Records]
- 2008 Gladiator & The Furious Fuckerz Meets Air Teo "Teoschock08" [Burned Records]
- 2008 Simon Beta "Hellboy"
- 2007 Simon Beta "The Greatest"
- 2006 Simon Beta "Check Point"
- 2005 Simon Beta "The Man On The Moon"
- 2003 Simon Beta "Pusher"
- 2003 Simon Beta "Time Will Never Stop"
- 2003 Simon Beta "Hard-est Style"
- 2003 Simon Beta "Noize System 3"

=== Remixes ===
- 2016-07-29 Twoloud - "My Remedy (Milke Lucas & Simon Beta Remix)
- 2015-08-07 Danny Avila & KAAZE - "Close Your Eyes (Simon Beta, Arda Diri, Mike Lucas Remix)" (Playbox Records)
- 2015 Sterling Fox - "Holy" (Mike Lucas & Simon Beta Remix)" (Bonerizing Records)
- 2014 David Jones & Ron Carroll - "You & Me (Mike Lucas & Simon Beta Remix)" (Time Records)
- 2014 Luengo & Diaz - "Erase & Rewind (Christopher Ank & Rehnoir Remix)" (High 5 Records)
- 2013 Deep Divas & Rehnoir - "Phaze" (BitPull Records)
- 2013 Corona & Simon from Deep Divas - "Baby Baby 2k13 (Party Killers & Rehnoir Remix)" DWA Records
- 2013 Thomas Newson - "Neutron (Doctors in Florence Remix)" (In Charge Records)
- 2009 Jack & Joy ft. Belle Erskine - "Break This Down"(Doctors in Florence Remix) (Adaptor Recordings)
- 2012 40's Mood - "India" (Doctors in Florence Remix) (Time Records)
- 2012 Maxime Zanetti - "Amnesia" (Doctors in Florence Remix)
- 2011 Yiruma - "River Flows in You" (Doctors in Florence Remix)
- 2011 William Naraine - "If I Could Fall" (Doctors in Florence RMX) (Ultra Records)
- 2011 Phandora - "Ruby Rain" (Doctors in Florence RMX)
- 2010 Jack & Joy ft. Belle Erskine - "Break This Down" (Doctors in Florence RMX)
- 2010 "Adagio for Strings" (Doctors in Florence RMX)
- 2010 Daresh Shyzmoon - "Dharma" (Fabio Andromeda & DJ Rehnoir Rmx)
- 2010 Music Hazard Inc. - "Axel" (Fabio Andromeda & DJ Rehnoir Rmx)
