= This Time Baby =

Song performed by The O'Jays

"This Time Baby" is a song written by the songwriting team Bell and James which, after being introduced by the O'Jays in 1978, became a 1979 disco hit for Jackie Moore.

== O'Jays version ==
The O'Jays 1978 album release So Full of Love introduced the song "This Time Baby", the track - featuring Eddie Levert on lead - being one of two album cuts produced by Thom Bell at his studio in the Kaye-Smith Studios in Seattle. "This Time Baby" would serve as B-side for the album's lead single: the million-seller "Use Ta Be My Girl" (the second Thom Bell production on So Full of Love: "Brandy", would be the album's second single.)

== Jackie Moore version ==
"This Time Baby"

Single by Jackie Moore

from the album I'm on My Way
- B-side: "Let's Go Somewhere & Make Love"
- Released: May 1979
- Recorded: November 1978
- Studio: Sigma Sound, Philadelphia, Pennsylvania
- Genre: Philly soul, disco
- Length: 7:15 (album version); 7:04 (12" single); 3:56 (7" single)
- Label: Columbia Records
- Songwriters: Casey James, LeRoy Bell
- Producer: Bobby Eli

Jackie Moore singles chronology
"Personally" (1978)	"This Time Baby" (1979)	"How's Your Love Life Baby" (1979)

Jackie Moore recorded "This Time Baby" in the November 1978 Sigma Sound sessions for her debut Columbia Records album release I'm on My Way, Moore recording "This Time Baby" at the suggestion of her fiancé Calvin Hopkins who had heard the track on the O'Jays' album So Full of Love. Philly soul virtuoso Bobby Eli, who oversaw Moore's sessions, was also producing the Atlantic Starr album Straight to the Point at Sigma Sound, and Atlantic Starr members Clifford Archer (bass), Porter Carroll (drums), David Lewis (guitar), Wayne Lewis (percussion), and Joseph Phillips (keyboards) played on "This Time Baby" plus four other tracks on the I'm On My Way album.

Issued as the album's lead single in May 1979, "This Time Baby" reached number one on the disco chart in Billboard magazine for one week in August 1979, crossing over to the Billboard R&B chart to spend seven weeks in that chart's top 40 with a peak of number 24. "This Time Baby" was afforded higher chart peaks on the R&B hit rankings in Billboard's rival "music trades": Cashbox and Record World, reaching number 18 on both magazine's R&B charts: also "This Time Baby" reached the lower end of the top 100 singles ranking in Record World peaking at number 94.

== Freemasons version ==
In 2005, "This Time Baby" was used for the dance radio and club hit, "Love on My Mind", by the Freemasons featuring Amanda Wilson.
