= The Flirtations (R&B musical group) =

American R&B musical group

- Also known as: The Gypsies
- Origin: South Carolina, U.S.
- Genres: Rhythm and blues, soul (especially northern soul)
- Years active: 1960–present
- Labels: Burbank Records, Old Town Records, Josie, Deram, Centre City Records
- Members: Ernestine Pearce; Shirley Pearce; Viola Billups
- Past members: Lestine Johnson; Betty Pearce; Loretta Noble
- Website: https://theflirtations.net

The Flirtations (previously The Gypsies) are an American girl group established in 1962, who found their greatest success after relocating to the United Kingdom. Their biggest hit was the 1968 song "Nothing but a Heartache".

== History ==
In 1962 in New York City, Lestine Johnson and sisters Ernestine Pearce, Shirley Pearce and Betty Pearce from South Carolina formed The Gypsies. In 1964 they signed to Old Town Records, where they released their debut single "Hey There, Hey There". The song achieved airplay only on local radio stations, but their next single – the J.J. Jackson-written "Jerk It" – was more successful, reaching #111 (pop) and #33 (R&B) in the spring of 1965. Despite the relative success of "Jerk It", Lestine Johnson left the group, replaced by Viola Billups. The Gypsies released only two singles on Old Town Records in 1966, giving them a total of four.

That year, now on Josie Records, the four women renamed themselves The Flirtations and released the well-regarded northern soul dancer "Change My Darkness Into Light". It was ignored by DJs and sales suffered. The quartet then moved to the Jamie-Guyden distributed label Festival Records, where they released "Stronger Than Her Love" and "Settle Down" as a single, which failed to spark much interest.

Betty Pearce left the group, reducing the Flirtations to a trio. After winning a small local talent contest in 1968 to see who could sound the most like the Supremes, they packed their bags and headed for England, where they signed to the Parrot label and in the fall of 1968 supported the label's star act Tom Jones on his European tour. The Flirtations' sole Parrot release was "Someone Out There", backed with "How Can You Tell Me?" It rose to second place on the "Bubbling Under" list in September 1968, and the track did afford the Flirtations a chart hit in the Netherlands with a No. 25 peak.

In late 1968 the trio signed with Deram Records and released what would become their signature recording, "Nothing But A Heartache" — a dense, dynamic, earth-shattering melodrama produced by Englishman Wayne Bickerton and written by Bickerton with Tony Waddington. The B-side was a Christmas song, "Christmastime Is Here Again". "Nothing But a Heartache" rose to first place on the "Bubbling Under" list in December 1968 and gave the Flirtations a second Top 40 hit in the Netherlands, reaching No. 36 in early 1969. On the success of those singles in March 1969 they embarked on an 18 date tour of the UK with Stevie Wonder and The Foundations.

Following an unsuccessful December 1968 US release, "Nothing But a Heartache" was re-issued in the US in early 1969, with "How Can You Tell Me?" now replacing the original seasonal B-side. "Nothing But a Heartache" debuted at No. 93 on the Billboard Hot 100 on 8 March 1969. The single reached the Top 20 in several US markets – its chart peak in Boston was No. 3 – but the staggered regional success indicated by its 14-week Hot 100 run dictated that its national peak – achieved on the 24 May 1969 Hot 100 – would be No. 34. (The Cash Box singles chart peak for "Nothing But a Heartache" was No. 31.) Somewhat reminiscent of mid-1960s Supremes – particularly "Stop! In the Name of Love" – the single is now generally regarded as a pop and Northern soul classic.

The follow-up was less of a dance tune than the previous single. "South Carolina" was a ballad that reached only No. 111 pop in July 1969. In 1970, "Keep On Searching" was released and did nothing. However, this may have been due to confusion over whether the newest single was "Searching" or "What's Good About Goodbye My Love". The latter peaked at No. 17 R&B in early 1970, but failed to make a dent in the pop charts. In July 1970 the trio scored another hit with another Bickerton and Waddington song, "Can't Stop Loving You". The song made No. 96 in Cash Box. The same year, Tom Jones also released a version of the song that reached US AC No. 3 and CAN AC No. 5.

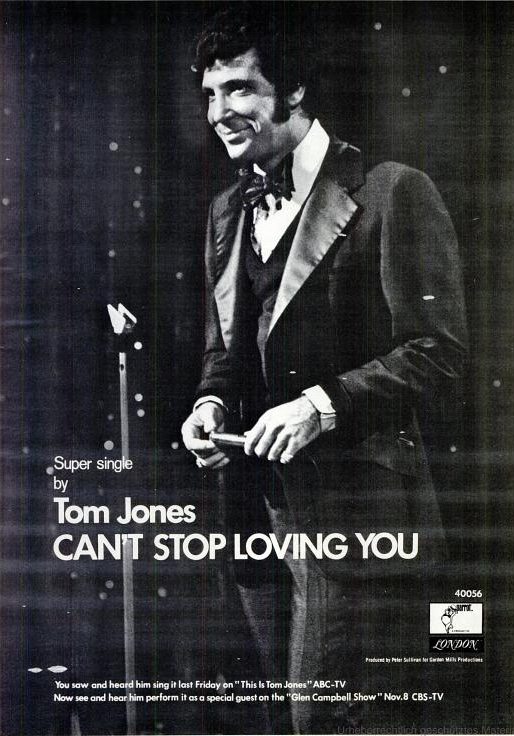
Advertising in Billboard (1970)

1971 saw their sixth and last Deram single, "Give Me Love" (not the George Harrison song). Not originally in their 1970 LP Sounds Like the Flirtations, but subsequently added to their 2008 CD version, it did not do well in the charts. The rest of their singles were not released in the U.S. Misty Browning, from Texas, replaced Viola Billups in 1972. Viola Billups embarked on a solo career as Vie and as Pearly Gates. Browning was followed by Loretta Noble. During 1972, the group were the resident vocal band on the long running BBC TV series It's Cliff Richard, backing Cliff Richard on various numbers, performing their own songs and supporting other guests on the show.

Throughout the 1970s the Flirtations released material on various labels. Polydor titles in 1971 and 1972 included "Little Darling (I Need You)", "Take Me In Your Arms (& Love Me)", "Hold On To Me Babe" and "Love A Little Longer". In 1973, their Mojo Records releases included "Why Didn't I Think of That". In 1975 it was RCA's turn: "Dirty Work", "Mr. Universe", and "One Night of Love", which gained enough sales and airplay for another LP, Love Makes the World Go Round, just before 1976.

The Flirtations recorded Hi-NRG tracks such as "Earthquake" (1983), "Read All About It" (1986) and "Back On My Feet Again" (1989), the latter reuniting Viola with the Pearce sisters. The track became a major hit in South Africa in 1984 reaching No. 6.

The band were rediscovered in the disco and Northern soul circuits of Australia, Canada, New Zealand, the UK and the U.S. Art Bell regularly used "Nothing But a Heartache" as bumper music for his overnight radio talk show in the 1990s and early 2000s. In the UK "Nothing But A Heartache" was used in an advertising campaign for KFC and, in 2007, was covered by The Freemasons. Ernestine Pearce can be seen at various venues along with Clem Curtis and Jimmy James as part of "The Soul Explosion" tour.

With Ian Levine forming his label Centre City Records, 2007, the ladies recorded regularly for the label compilations. In 2009, they released their first single in 20 years, "Roulette", produced by Soren Jensen for Night Dance Records, including mixes and a music video. The track peaked at No. 10 in Music Week's Commercial Pop Club Chart by December 2009.

In 2025 the album Love Makes The World Go Round is now finally available on streaming services including the 1975 single "Mr Universe"

== Albums discography ==
- 1969 Nothing But A Heartache
- 1970 Sounds Like The Flirtations
- 1976 Love Makes the World Go Around
- 2015 Girls
- 2024 Still Sounds Like The Flirtations

== Singles discography ==
=== The Gypsies ===
- 1964 "Hey There" / "Blue Bird"
- 1965 "Jerk It" / "Diamonds, Rubies, Gold And Fame"
- 1965 "It's A Woman's World (You Better Believe It)" / "They're Having A Party"
- 1966 "Oh I Wonder Why" / "Diamonds, Rubies, Gold And Fame"

=== The Flirtations ===
- 1966 "Change My Darkness Into Light" / "Natural Born Lover"
- 1967 "Stronger Than Her Love" / "Settle Down"
- 1968 "How Can You Tell Me"/ "Someone Out There"
- 1968 "Nothing but a Heartache" / "Christmas Time Is Here Again"
- 1968 "Nothing But A Heartache" / "How Can You Tell Me"
- 1969 "Need Your Loving" / "South Carolina"
- 1969 "Keep On Searchin'" / "I Wanna Be There"
- 1969 "Can't Stop Lovin' You"/ "Everybody Needs Somebody"
- 1970 "Give Me Love, Love, Love" / "This Must Be The End Of The Line"
- 1971 "Take Me In Your Arms And Love Me" / "Little Darling (I Need You)"
- 1972 "Hold On To Me Baby" / "Love a Little Longer"
- 1973 "Why Didn't I Think Of That" / "Oh Mia Bamba"
- 1974 "Dirty Work" / "No Such Thing As A Miracle"
- 1975 "Mr. Universe" / "Somebody Cared For Me"
- 1975 "Lover Where Are You Now?" / "One Night Of Love"
- 1983 "Earthquake" / "Earthquake" (Instrumental)
- 1986 "Read All About It" / "Read All About It" (Nightmare Dub Mix)
- 1986 "Get Up (Come On Over)" / "Get Up (Come On Over)" (Instrumental)
- 1989 "Back on My Feet Again" / "Back on My Feet Again" (Reunion Instrumental Mix)
- 2009 "Roulette"(C.D. Single. 8 Various Mixes)
- 2013 "You Pulled A Fast One" / "My Way Or The Highway"
- 2015 "Nowhere To Run"
