= Jackie Moore (singer) =

American musician (1946–2019)

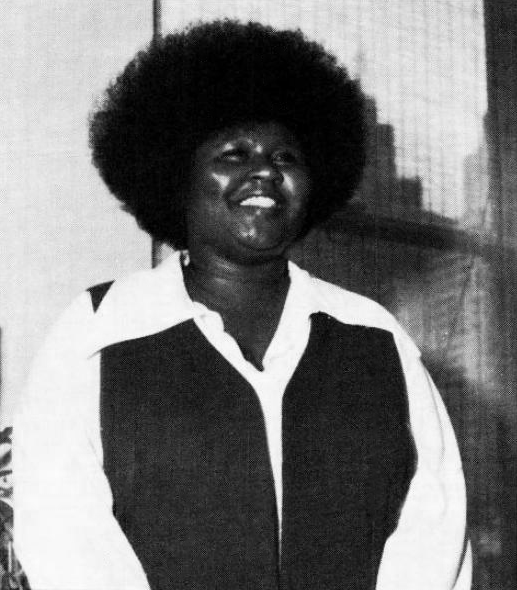
- Moore in 1970

Background information
- Born: 1946; Jacksonville, Florida, U.S.
- Died: November 8, 2019 (aged 73)
- Genres: Southern soul, soul
- Occupation: Vocalist
- Instrument: Vocals
- Years active: 1970s
- Labels: Shout; Wand; Atlantic; RCA; Columbia Records

Jackie Moore (1946 – November 8, 2019) was an American R&B singer. Moore was born in Jacksonville, Florida. She achieved a gold single for the 1970 song "Precious, Precious," which reached No. 30 on the US Billboard Hot 100 chart on March 6, 1971. This disc sold over one million copies, and received the gold certification from the R.I.A.A. in March 1971.

Also noteworthy was her 1979 disco single "This Time Baby," which peaked at No. 49 on the UK Singles Chart and hit No. 1 on the US Hot Dance Music/Club Play chart. The song would later be sampled for the 2005 dance radio and dance chart hit "Love on My Mind" by the Freemasons featuring Amanda Wilson. Moore also had a moderate US pop chart hit (No. 42) with Bunny Sigler and Phil Hurtt's upbeat "Sweet Charlie Babe" in the fall of 1973, which she recorded with the Philadelphia Strings and Horns.

== Career ==
Before her success at Atlantic Records and Columbia Records, Moore recorded for Wand Records which produced the single "Who Told You." Her debut "Dear John" was released on Shout Records in 1969.

Reviewing the 1973 Sweet Charlie Babe LP, Robert Christgau wrote in Christgau's Record Guide: Rock Albums of the Seventies (1981), "Figures that this should fall somewhere between state-of-the-art and great-mean soul: the five hits go back to 'Precious, Precious' in the winter of '71, with the two latest cut at a funkier-than-usual Sigma in Philadelphia and the others by a simpler-than-usual Crawford-Shapiro team at Criteria in Miami. Moore's voice is simultaneously sweet and rough, an unusual combination in a woman, and the songs are pretty consistent. But she lacks not only persona but personality, so that what in technical terms is pretty impressive stuff never goes over the top."

"This Time Baby" was a featured song in the video game, Grand Theft Auto: Vice City Stories.

== Discography ==
=== Studio albums ===
Year	Title	Peaks	Record label
Year	Title	US R&B	Record label
1973	Sweet Charlie Babe	45	Atlantic
1975	Make Me Feel Like a Woman	—	Kayvette
1979	I'm on My Way	45	Columbia
1980	With Your Love	—	Columbia
"—" denotes a recording that did not chart.

- Precious, Precious: The Best of Jackie Moore (1994, Ichiban)
- The Complete Atlantic Recordings (2015, Real Gone Music)

=== Singles ===
Year	Title	Peak chart positions					Certifications	Album
Year	Title	US	US R&B	US Dan	CAN	UK	Certifications	Album
1968	"Dear John"	—	—	—	—	—		—N/a
1968	"Why Don’t You Call on Me"	—	—	—	—	—		—N/a
1969	"Loser Again"	—	—	—	—	—		—N/a
1970	"Precious, Precious"	30	12	—	70	—	RIAA: Gold	Sweet Charlie Babe
1971	"Sometimes It’s Got to Rain (In Your Love Life)" (with The Dixie Flyers)	—	19	—	—	—		—N/a
1971	"Cover Me"	—	—	—	—	—		Sweet Charlie Babe
1972	"Darling Baby"	106	26	—	—	—		Sweet Charlie Babe
1972	"It Ain't Who You Know"	—	—	—	—	—		—N/a
1972	"Time"	—	39	—	—	—		Sweet Charlie Babe
1973	"Sweet Charlie Babe"	42	15	—	78	—		Sweet Charlie Babe
1973	"Both Ends Against the Middle"	102	28	—	—	—		Sweet Charlie Babe
1975	"Make Me Feel Like a Woman"	—	6	—	—	—		Make Me Feel Like a Woman
1976	"Puttin’ It Down to You"	—	37	—	—	—		Make Me Feel Like a Woman
1976	"It’s Harder to Leave"	—	74	—	—	—		—N/a
1976	"Disco Body (Shake It to the East, Shake It to the West)"	—	36	—	—	—		—N/a
1977	"Make Me Yours"	—	72	—	—	—		—N/a
1978	"Personally"	—	92	—	—	—		—N/a
1979	"This Time Baby"	—	24	1	—	49		I'm on My Way
1980	"Helpless"	—	—	25	—	—		With Your Love
1980	"How’s Your Love Life Baby"	—	—	57	—	—		I'm on My Way
1980	"Love Won't Let Me Wait"	—	78	—	—	—		With Your Love
1980	"Heart Be Still"	—	—	—	—	—		Make Me Feel Like a Woman
1981	"Who's Next, Who's Now"	—	—	—	—	—		—N/a
1982	"Seconds" (Wilson Pickett)	—	—	—	—	—		—N/a
1983	"Holding Back"	—	73	—	—	—		—N/a
1985	"Love Is the Answer"	—	—	—	—	—		—N/a
"—" denotes a recording that did not chart or was not released in that territory.

== See also ==
- List of number-one dance hits (United States)
- List of artists who reached number one on the US Dance chart
