= Freemasons (DJs) =

English-Irish DJ band

- Also known as: BN3; The Alibi; Walken; Funk Fanatics; Pegasus; F9
- Origin: Brighton, East Sussex, England
- Genres: House; funky house; nu-disco; Eurodance
- Years active: 2003–present
- Label: Loaded
- Members: James Wiltshire; Russell Small

Freemasons are an English house music duo from Brighton, East Sussex. The act consists of the producers Russell Small (who is also one half of the house production duo Phats & Small) and James Wiltshire (who also works with Phats & Small under the alias 'Jimmy Gomez').

== Biography ==
=== 2005–2007: Early career ===
Their name is taken from the Brighton pub, Freemasons Tavern, which they frequently visit. The duo also record and remix under the similar-sounding "Freemaison" name, which is also the name of their record label that was founded in 2005. Freemasons have also produced tracks under the names of Alibi, Walken, Funk Fanatics and BN3 (which is part of their hometown of Hove's postal code).

In 2005, the duo transformed Jackie Moore's 1979 #1 Billboard Hot Dance Club Play track "This Time Baby", and Tina Turner's 1999 hit "When the Heartache Is Over", into an international nightclub hit as "Love on My Mind". A #11 hit in the UK, it was also released in the United States on their U.S. label, the New York based Ultra Records.

Freemasons were also the remixers on Faith Evans' 2005 #1 Hot Dance Club Play and #4 Hot Dance Airplay hit, "Mesmerized". Their follow-up song, "Watchin'" was released in the United States in 2006 with Amanda Wilson as the lead vocalist for the track. "Watchin'" peaked at #1 on the Hot Dance Club Play and within the Top 20 of the Hot Dance Airplay chart. The third original single from Freemasons, "Rain Down Love", reached the Top 20 of the Hot Dance Airplay chart. Their fourth single (released digitally), "Nothing but a Heartache" featuring vocals from Sylvia Mason-James, was released in June 2007. Freemasons also remixed Beyoncé's original song, "Déjà Vu" in 2006 (for which they were nominated for a Grammy Award). They followed this up with further remixes of "Ring the Alarm", "Beautiful Liar" (duet with Shakira), and "Green Light". They also co-produced "The One" on Kylie Minogue's album X with Richard Stannard and remixed the song for single release in May 2008.

=== 2007–2009: Unmixed and Shakedown 2 ===
On 29 October 2007, Freemasons released Unmixed, an album containing unmixed versions of most of their mixes to date. As a bonus, there is a data track containing samples and a cappella versions of "Unmixed". In 2007, Freemasons worked with Kelly Rowland, to produce the remix of her single "Work", for the non-American markets. That same year they were rumoured to be producing an album for Donna Summer, but the project fell through due to scheduling commitments.

The follow-up to their own version of "Uninvited", "When You Touch Me", was released in the UK on 30 June 2008. The song featured Katherine Ellis. The music video premiered in May 2008. The song entered the UK Singles Chart in June 2008 and reached its peak of #23 on 6 July.

Beyoncé's sister, Solange Knowles used the duo's production skills to create her single "I Decided" for its release in 2008.

On 15 June 2009, Freemasons released the song "Heartbreak (Make Me a Dancer)", featuring Sophie Ellis-Bextor, in the UK. The single peaked at #13 in the UK, making it their fifth Top 20 hit on the UK Singles Chart, and was a smash hit on the club charts. It had success in the European charts. X Factor 2008 winner Alexandra Burke confirmed on her official website that Freemasons had produced tracks for her debut album.

=== 2010–present: Shakedown 3 ===
The duo released a remix EP Summer of Pride Mix digitally on 15 August 2010 which peaked at #23 on the UK Dance Singles Chart. The single (including an edited version) was released in the UK on 5 December 2010. "Believer" features R&B singer Wynter Gordon.

In April 2012, Russell discussed with fans after a gig in Bournemouth about talk of signing a new contract on Ministry of Sound's label, to release an album in early 2013. He is quoted as saying, "It's still early days, however they have said that they will want lots of collaborations. It's something to look forward to."

Wiltshire now produces music with F9 Audio. Small continues to DJ around the world and produce music with production partner DNO P.

== Discography ==
=== Freemasons albums ===
Title	Album details	Peak chart positions						Certifications
Title	Album details	UK	UK Dance	UK Comp	BEL	NED	SCO	Certifications
Shakedown	Released: 22 January 2007; Label: Loaded; Formats: CD, digital download	81	1	—	—	—	—	
Unmixed	Released: 29 October 2007; Label: Loaded; Formats: CD, digital download	58	6	—	26	85	88	UK: Silver
Shakedown 2	Released: 29 June 2009; Label: Loaded; Formats: CD, digital download	—	9	17	—	—	—	
Shakedown 3	Released: 4 August 2014; Label: Loaded; Formats: CD, digital download	—	10	76	—	—	—	
Greatest Hits	Released: 25 September 2026; Label: Loaded; Formats: CD, digital download	—	—	—	—	—	—	
"—" denotes items that did not chart or were not released in that territory.

=== Freemasons singles ===
Year	Title	Peak chart positions										Certifications	Album
Year	Title	UK	UK Dance	AUS	BEL	FIN	FRA	IRE	NED	SCO	US Dance	Certifications	Album
2005	"Love on My Mind" (featuring Amanda Wilson)	11	7	46	27	—	70	38	26	22	2	UK: Silver	Shakedown
2006	"Watchin'" (featuring Amanda Wilson)	19	2	—	34	5	—	49	29	16	24		Shakedown
2007	"Rain Down Love" (featuring Siedah Garrett)	12	4	96	20	8	—	—	53	9	—		Shakedown
2007	"Nothing but a Heartache" (featuring Sylvia Mason-James)	—	—	—	—	—	—	—	—	—	—		Shakedown
2007	"Uninvited" (featuring Bailey Tzuke)	8	1	— (Note: "Uninvited" peaked at umber 39 on the ARIA physical sales chart.)	2	—	11	50	4	9	23	UK: Gold	Unmixed
2008	"When You Touch Me" (featuring Katherine Ellis)	23	2	—	28	—	—	—	30	10	—		Unmixed
2009	"If" (featuring Hazel Fernandes)	—	—	—	—	22	—	—	—	—	—		Unmixed
2009	"Heartbreak (Make Me a Dancer)" (featuring Sophie Ellis-Bextor)	13	2	51	33	19	—	38	51	5	—		Shakedown 2
2010	"Believer" (featuring Wynter Gordon)	—	—	—	—	—	—	—	46	—	11		Shakedown 3
2013	"Bring It Back"	—	—	—	—	—	—	—	—	—	—		Shakedown 3
2013	"Dirty Organ" (featuring Joel Edwards)	—	—	—	—	—	—	—	—	—	—		Shakedown 3
2013	"Tears" (featuring Katherine Ellis)	—	—	—	—	—	—	—	—	—	—		Shakedown 3
2014	"U Drive Me Crazy" (featuring Joel Edwards)	—	—	—	—	—	—	—	—	—	—		Shakedown 3
2015	"True Love Survivor" (featuring Solah)	—	—	—	—	—	—	—	—	—	—		Shakedown 3
2016	"Firebird" (Presents F9)	—	—	—	—	—	—	—	—	—	—		
2026	"Mesmerized"	—	—	—	—	—	—	—	—	—	—		Greatest Hits
2026	"Sandcastle Disco"	—	—	—	—	—	—	—	—	—	—		Greatest Hits
"—" denotes items that did not chart or were not released in that territory.

=== Pegasus singles ===
Year	Title
1998	"Pegasus"
2013	"Into My Arms"
2013	"Gorecki" (featuring Levana)

=== Pegasus promotional singles ===
Year	Title
2014	"Pegasus Rising"
2014	"True Love Survivor" (featuring Hana)

=== Remixes ===
Year	Artist	Title
2004	B.E.D. (featuring Chloe Myers)	"Before I Leave"
2004	U-Neeq (featuring Freddie Mercury)	"Love Kills"
2005	Suntan (featuring Tia)	"The Beach"
2005	Studio B	"I See Girls"
2005	Jamiroquai	"(Don't) Give Hate a Chance"
2005	The Disco Boys	"For You"
2005	Faith Evans	"Mesmerized"
2005	Xavier	"Give Me the Night"
2005	Herd & Fitz (featuring Abigail Bailey)	"I Just Can't Get Enough"
2005	Trick vs Freemasons	"Zap Me Lovely (The Nokia Song)"
2005	Steve Mac vs Mosquito (featuring Steve Smith)	"Lovin' You More"
2005	Studio B	"C'mon, Get It On"
2005	Black Fras	"Movin' Into Light"
2005	Angie Stone	"I Wasn't Kidding"
2006	Beyoncé (featuring Jay-Z)	"Déjà Vu"
2006	Beyoncé	"Ring the Alarm"
2006	Fatboy Slim	"Right Here, Right Now"
2006	Loleatta Holloway	"Love Sensation"
2006	Luther Vandross	"Shine"
2006	Blaze (featuring Barbara Tucker)	"Most Precious Love 2006"
2006	Supafly Inc.	"Moving Too Fast"
2006	Heather Headley	"In My Mind"
2007	Disco Freaks	"Take Me 2 the Sun"
2007	Beyoncé & Shakira	"Beautiful Liar"
2007	Beyoncé	"Green Light"
2007	Patrick Alavi	"Goldbass"
2007	Alibi vs Rockefeller (featuring Marvin Gaye)	"Sexual Healing"
2007	Kelly Rowland	"Work"
2008	Gusto (featuring Amanda Wilson)	"Disco's Revenge 2008"
2008	Kylie Minogue	"The One"
2008	Solange	"I Decided"
2008	Solange	"Sandcastle Disco"
2008	Moby (featuring Shayna Steele)	"Disco Lies"
2008	Eric Prydz	"Pjanoo"
2008	The Outsiders (featuring Amanda Wilson)	"Keep This Fire Burning"
2008	Funk Fanatics (featuring Peyton)	"Love Is the Answer"
2009	Whitney Houston	"Million Dollar Bill"
2009	Mr. DYF (featuring Shena)	"Hold On"
2009	Eurythmics	"Here Comes the Rain Again"
2010	Faith Hill	"Breathe"
2010	Shakira	"Gypsy"
2010	Sophie Ellis-Bextor	"Bittersweet"
2010	Hurts	"Wonderful Life"
2010	Shakira (featuring Freshlyground)	"Waka Waka (This Time for Africa)"
2010	Shakira (featuring Dizzee Rascal)	"Loca"
2010	Pegasus	"Pegasus"
2010	George Michael	"I Want Your Sex"
2010	Rihanna	"Only Girl (In the World)"
2011	Alexis Jordan	"Good Girl"
2011	Yasmin	"Finish Line"
2011	Yasmin (featuring Shy FX & Ms. Dynamite)	"Light Up (The World)"
2011	Nightcrawlers (featuring Taio Cruz)	"Cryin' Over You"
2011	Hurts	"Better Than Love"
2012	Adele	"Rolling in the Deep"
2012	Justice	"Phantom Pt. II"
2012	Emeli Sandé	"Heaven"
2012	Rizzle Kicks	"Mama Do the Hump"
2012	Katy Perry	"Part of Me"
2012	Christophe Willem	"Starlite"
2013	Depeche Mode	"Heaven"
2013	Hurts	"Exile"
2013	John Newman	"Cheating"
2013	Pegasus	"Into My Arms"
2013	Rubylux vs Freemasons	"The World Goes Quiet"
2013	London Grammar	"Nightcall"
2014	Pegasus (featuring Levana Wolf)	"Gorecki"
2014	Gorgon City (featuring Jennifer Hudson)	"Go All Night"
2015	Therese	"Put 'Em High 2015"
2016	Sophie Ellis-Bextor	"Come with Us"
2016	Sophie Ellis-Bextor	"Crystallise"
2017	Sophie Ellis-Bextor	"Wild Forever"
2018	Metro feat. Nelly Furtado	"Sticks & stones"
2018	Paloma Faith	"Make Your Own Kind of Music"
2018	All Saints	"After All"
2019	Eden xo	"Have It All"
2019	Jamie Hannah	"Sound of My Youth"
2019	Molly Hammar	"Words"
2019	Will Young	"Your Love"
2019	Diana Rouvas	"Wait for No One"
2019	Alphabeat	"Shadows"
2019	I Am Boleyn	"Too Much"
2020	Alanis Morissette	"Smiling"
2020	Sia	"Together"
2020	Annie	"The Streets Where I Belong"
2020	Kylie Minogue	"Say Something"
2020	Gary Barlow	"Incredible"
2021	Marisha Wallace	"Faith"
2021	Steps	"A Hundred Years of Winter"
2024	Alanis Morissette	"Uninvited"

=== Production credits ===
- 2007 "The One" - Kylie Minogue (Freemasons, R. Stannard)
- 2008 "I Decided, Pt. 2" - Solange (Freemasons, The Neptunes)
- 2010 "Bittersweet" - Sophie Ellis-Bextor (Freemasons, Biffco)
- 2020 "Groovejet (If This Ain't Love) (2020 version)" - Sophie Ellis-Bextor (Freemasons, Richard Jones)
