= Tony Waddington (songwriter) =

- Born: Anthony Brandon Joseph Waddington; 1943 (age 82–83); Liverpool, England
- Occupations: Singer-songwriter, record producer, film producer, orchestral arranger, composer, screenplay writer
- Instruments: Guitar, Piano
- Years active: 1960s–present
- Label: Decca Records Polydor Records
- Formerly of: Pete Best Combo, Pete Best Four, The Rubettes
- Website: tonywaddington.com

Anthony Brandon Joseph Waddington (born 1943) is an English singer-songwriter, record producer, film producer, screenplay writer, and creative media executive. He became well known with Wayne Bickerton, as writer and producer of a series of UK chart hits in the 1970s for The Rubettes. He also received an Ivor Novello Award as "Songwriter of the Year".

== Life and career ==
He was born in 1943 in Liverpool, and studied classical guitar and music theory. His first job was working at a solicitor's office in Liverpool, but he played with several local bands including Lee Curtis and the All-Stars and the Pete Best Four (later the Pete Best Combo), at the same time as his childhood friend Wayne Bickerton was the band's lead vocalist. As well as sharing most of the singing, Bickerton and Waddington became songwriters for the group, which toured mainly in Germany and the US, before they left in 1966. Then Waddington spent time in the United States and on his return to the UK joined Decca Records as a songwriter and record producer. He also studied orchestral writing under the tutelage of Henry Zajaczkowski.

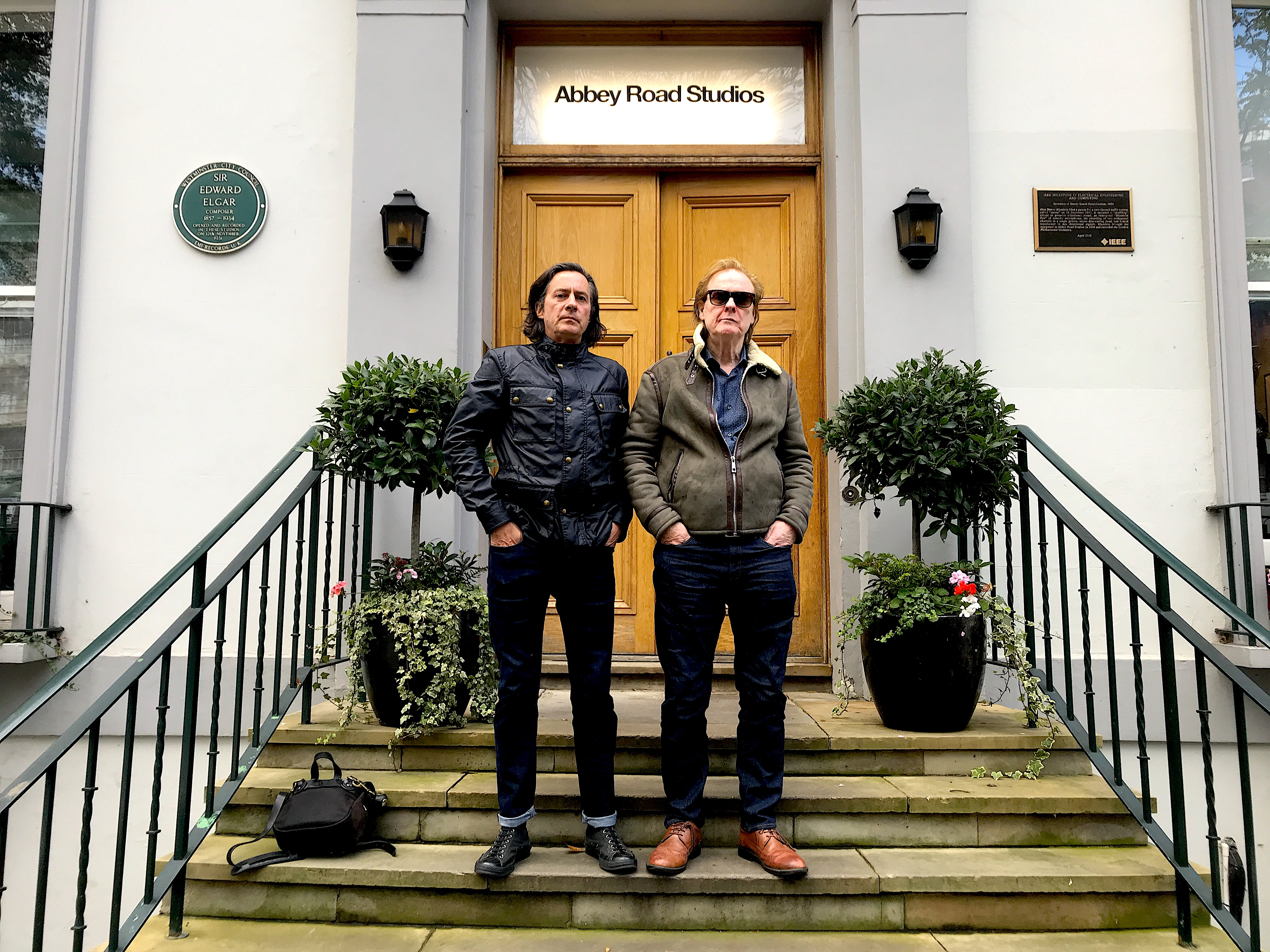
Tony Waddington and Dan Donovan at Abbey Road Studios

He and Bickerton continued writing songs together. One of the most successful was "Nothing but a Heartache", recorded by American girl singing group The Flirtations, which reached No. 34 on the US Billboard Hot 100 in 1969, and is now regarded as a Northern soul classic. It was recorded 36 years later by Southside Johnny in 2005.

During this period, he and Bickerton also came up with the idea for a rock and roll musical. They co-wrote and produced a demonstration recording of a song, "Sugar Baby Love", originally intending to submit it for the Eurovision Song Contest but instead offering it to Showaddywaddy, who turned it down. Bickerton and Waddington then offered it to the demo musicians, provided that they would become an actual group. The musicians agreed, were named The Rubettes, and "Sugar Baby Love" became a UK number one hit in 1974, also reaching number 37 in the US chart. They wrote and produced all of the Rubettes' subsequent UK hits – nine Top 50 hits in all between 1974 and 1977 – winning an Ivor Novello Award as Songwriters of the Year, and also reached the UK Top 10 with "Sugar Candy Kisses" by Mac and Katie Kissoon.

They set up their own record label, State Records, which diversified in 1979 into owning Odyssey Studios and a new office building at Marble Arch in central London, later sold to the radio station Jazz FM.

Waddington has also co-written songs for Petula Clark, Tom Jones, and Brotherhood of Man. More recently, Waddington has orchestrated scores for television productions. His music has been used in several films including Muriel's Wedding (1994), Resurrection Man (1998) and Breakfast on Pluto (2005).

As of 2013 Waddington is a director of Park Lane Media.
