= Disco's Revenge =

1996 single by Gusto

Single by Gusto
- B-side: "Remix"
- Released: February 1996
- Recorded: 1995
- Genre: House
- Length: 4:03
- Label: Bumble Beats Records
- Songwriters: Sally Mason; Kenny Mason
- Producer: Gusto

Gusto singles chronology
"The Spirit" (1995)	"Disco's Revenge" (1996)	"Let's All Chant" (1996)

"Disco's Revenge" is a song recorded by American house producer Gusto. It was released in February 1996, by Bumble Beats Records, as a single only. The song, which mainly consists of a looped sample from Harvey Mason's 1979 song "Groovin' You", reached number nine in the United Kingdom and number one on the RPM Dance/Urban chart in Canada. The title quotes Frankie Knuckles, who had described house music as being "disco's revenge". In 2008, a new remix was release named "Disco's Revenge 2008".

== Critical reception ==
British Music Week gave "Disco's Revenge" a score of three out of five, adding that "New Jersey's Gusto delivers a classy, bassy track, which has been championed by Radio One but has limited crossover potential." James Hamilton from the Record Mirror Dance Update described it as a "Harvey Mason 'Groovin' You' riff based 'bum bum bum' bumbling simple hypnotic strider" in his weekly dance column. DJ Freshy-D from Smash Hits gave it four out of five, saying, "Simple 'n' irresistible! 'Disco's Revenge' is better known in the clubs as the one that goes boom... boom... boom! Gusto's heaving bassline, pumpin' beats and repetitive giant's vocal make for a stormin' floor-filler you just can't get out of your head!"

== Track listings ==
- CD maxi - Europe
1. "Disco's Revenge" (Short Dirty Mix) - 3:50
2. "Disco's Revenge" (Church Mix) - 7:04
3. "Disco's Revenge" (Mojo Beats) - 7:08
- CD maxi- Europe (Remixes)
1. "Disco's Revenge" (Short Dirty Mix) - 3:51
2. "Disco's Revenge" (Acappella) - 4:13
3. "Disco's Revenge" (Antonio Bandera's Guitarra Mix) - 6:47
4. "Disco's Revenge" (David Anthony & Tom Moulton Full Vocal) - 12:48
5. "Disco's Revenge" (David Anthony UK Radio mix) - 3:16
6. "Disco's Revenge" (David Anthony UK Vocal mix) - 6:34
7. "Disco's Revenge" (Deep Dish Remix) - 12:31
8. "Disco's Revenge" (GustHouse Remix) - 8:20
9. "Disco's Revenge" (Johnny Vicious Remix) - 9:34

== Charts ==
=== Weekly charts ===
Chart (1995)	Peak position
UK Club Chart (Music Week)	33

Chart (1996)	Peak position
Belgium (Ultratop 50 Flanders)	22
Canada Dance/Urban (RPM)	1
Europe (Eurochart Hot 100)	23
France (SNEP)	26
Iceland (Íslenski Listinn Topp 40)	30
Ireland (IRMA)	27
Israel (Israeli Singles Chart)	25
Italy (Musica e dischi)	22
Netherlands (Dutch Top 40)	25
Netherlands (Single Top 100)	23
Scotland (OCC)	19
Sweden (Sverigetopplistan)	59
UK Singles (OCC)	9
UK Dance (OCC)	1
UK Club Chart (Music Week)	1
UK Pop Tip Club Chart (Music Week)	6

Chart (1998)	Peak position
UK Singles (OCC)	100

Chart (2004)	Peak position
UK Dance (OCC)	27

Chart (2008)	Peak position
Scotland (OCC)	25
UK Singles (OCC)	34
UK Singles Downloads (OCC)	46

=== Year-end charts ===
Chart (1996)	Position
UK Club Chart (Music Week)	59
