= Henry Zajaczkowski =

British musicologist

Henry Zajaczkowski is a British musicologist and a specialist in the music of Pyotr Ilyich Tchaikovsky. He has served as a contributor to The Music Review, The Musical Times and the journal of the Tschaikowsky-Gesellschaft. He has given talks on Russian music for BBC Radio 3 and has spoken publicly on Tchaikovsky at Lincoln Center in New York. He taught music privately in London (1982-2013). He is now in semi-retirement and lives and works in Nottinghamshire, England. He has also worked as a eurythmy pianist at the Iona School, Nottingham, 2005-2010, and again from 2015-2016, following which he is, as of May 2016, engaged as a translator for the Tchaikovsky Research website. He is assisting with translating the composer's correspondence into English. His first translation, of a letter from 1878, concerns the opera The Maid of Orleans.

His musicological articles include 'Tchaikovsky, Cui and Russian Chamber Music: Commemorative Article on the 175th Anniversary of Tchaikovsky's Birth', published in 2015 and, in commemoration of the 125th anniversary of Tchaikovsky's death, his annotated account of an interview with Galina von Meck, the composer's great-niece, has been published in 2018.

He is also active as a composer. His pieces include 'The Oak in Winter [2013]' for piano solo, recorded in a performance by the composer on 1 Nov. 2017.

His first book, Tchaikovsky's Musical Style, has been reissued, with corrected misprints and revised index, as a free pdf download.

== Books ==
- Tchaikovsky's Musical Style (Russian Music Studies, 19) (Ann Arbor: UMI Research Press, 1987). ISBN 0-8357-1806-9.
- An Introduction to Tchaikovsky's Operas (Westport, Conn.: Praeger, 2005). ISBN 0-275-97949-0.

== Articles ==
- "Tchaikovsky, Cui and Russian Chamber Music: Commemorative Article on the 175th Anniversary of Tchaikovsky's Birth" http://en.tchaikovsky-research.net/pages/Bibliography_(2015/17)
- An interview with Galina von Meck (Published 2018) http://en.tchaikovsky-research.net/pages/Galina_von_Meck

== Translations ==
http://en.tchaikovsky-research.net/pages/Letter_976

=== Bibliography ===
- http://www.henryzajaczkowski.co.uk/home/musicological-publications/
