= Gusto (producer) =

American house producer

- Born: Edward Lee Greene
- Origin: New Jersey, United States
- Genres: House
- Occupations: Musician, DJ
- Years active: 1995–present
- Label: Bumble Beats Records

Edward Lee Greene, also known as Gusto, is an American house producer and DJ. He is best known for his song "Disco's Revenge", which was released in 1996 and charted in several countries.

== Discography ==
=== Singles ===
==== As Sounds of the Last Days ====
Year	Single	Peak chart positions							Album
Year	Single	BEL (Vl)	CAN Dance	FRA	IRE	NED	SWE	UK	Album
1993	"Hold On Tight" (featuring Cassandra Harris)	—	—	—	—	—	—	—	Single only
"—" denotes releases that did not chart

==== As Gusto ====
Year	Single	Peak chart positions							Album
Year	Single	BEL (Vl)	CAN Dance	FRA	IRE	NED	SWE	UK	Album
1996	"Disco's Revenge"	22	1	26	27	23	59	9	Singles only
1996	"Let's All Chant"	43	—	—	—	—	—	21	Singles only
2008	"Disco's Revenge 2008" (Freemasons Remix)	28	—	—	—	45	—	34	Singles only
"—" denotes releases that did not chart

== Production discography ==
Title	Year	Artist(s)	Album	Credit(s)
"A Little More Love"	1998	Roz White	Non-album single	Production
