= Wayne Bickerton =

British songwriter and record producer (1941–2015)

- Born: Arthur Ronald Bickerton; 11 July 1941; Rhyl, Denbighshire, Wales
- Origin: Kirkdale, Liverpool, England
- Died: 29 November 2015 (aged 74) Hertfordshire, England
- Occupation(s): Songwriter, record producer, music business executive
- Labels: State Records (founder)

Wayne Bickerton (born Arthur Ronald Bickerton; 11 July 1941 – 29 November 2015) was a British record producer, songwriter and music business executive. He became well known, with Tony Waddington, as writer and producer of a series of UK chart hits in the 1970s for The Rubettes, and as a leading figure in SESAC – one of the three major American performing rights organisations.

== Life and career ==
Born in Rhyl, Denbighshire, Wales, and named after his father, Bickerton grew up in Kirkdale, Liverpool. He first came to prominence in 1963 when, after spells with the Bobby Bell Rockers (featuring Det Pete), Steve & the Syndicate, Lee Curtis and the All-Stars and the Remo Four, he became bassist and singer with the Pete Best Four (later the Pete Best Combo), at the same time as childhood friend Tony Waddington became the group's guitarist. As well as sharing most of the singing, Bickerton and Waddington became songwriters for the group, which toured mainly in Germany and the US, before they left in 1966.

Bickerton then became a record producer at Deram Records, responsible for albums by Giles, Giles & Fripp (the forerunner to King Crimson) and World of Oz; he also worked with Petula Clark and Tom Jones. He later joined Polydor Records, becoming A&R chief and producing the band Mongrel. At the same time, he and Waddington continued writing songs together. One of the most successful was "Nothing But A Heartache", recorded by American girl singing group The Flirtations, which reached No. 34 on the US Billboard Hot 100 in 1969, No. 31 on the Canadian RPM Magazine charts, and is now regarded as a northern soul classic. It was later recorded by Southside Johnny and the Asbury Jukes.

During this period, he and Waddington also came up with the idea for a rock 'n' roll musical. They co-wrote and produced a demonstration recording of a song, "Sugar Baby Love", originally intending to submit it for the Eurovision Song Contest but instead offering it to Showaddywaddy, who turned it down. Bickerton and Waddington then offered it to the demo musicians, provided that they would become an actual group. The musicians agreed, became The Rubettes, and "Sugar Baby Love" became a UK #1 hit in 1974, also reaching No. 37 in the US charts and No. 25 in Canada. They wrote and produced all of the Rubettes' subsequent UK hits – nine Top 50 hits in all between 1974 and 1977 – winning an Ivor Novello Award as Songwriters of the Year, and also reached the UK Top 10 with "Sugar Candy Kisses" by Mac and Katie Kissoon. They set up their own record label, State Records, which diversified in 1979 into owning Odyssey Studios and a new office building at Marble Arch in central London, later sold to the radio station Jazz FM.

Bickerton moved into the upper reaches of the wider music industry, initially as an executive of the Performing Right Society in England, where he worked from the late 1970s, eventually as chairman and acting Chief executive. He also became Deputy Chairman of The University of Liverpool Institute of Popular Music. In 1997, he became an executive at SESAC, as Chairman of SESAC International, and was also awarded an honorary doctorate (LL.D.) by the University of Liverpool.

== Death ==
He died on 28 November 2015 aged 74 at his home in Hertfordshire, England.
