= Bailey Tzuke =

British singer-songwriter

- Born: Bailey Jean Muggleton-Tzuke; 28 June 1987 (age 39)
- Origin: London, England, United Kingdom
- Genres: Pop, electronica
- Occupations: Singer, songwriter
- Instrument: Vocals
- Website: Official website Myspace

Bailey Tzuke (born Bailey Jean Muggleton-Tzuke; 28 June 1987) is an English singer-songwriter. She is the daughter of the singer-songwriter Judie Tzuke and record producer Paul Muggleton.

Tzuke has toured with and performed backing vocals for her mother for many years. In October 2007, she was featured on the Freemasons song "Uninvited" (a reworking of the 1998 Alanis Morissette song) which made number 8 in the UK charts and number 4 in the Netherlands.

Tzuke has since contributed vocals to Rollo Armstrong's new project "All Thieves". She has also been working on her own material, having signed up to the digital distribution company AWAL (Artists Without A Label). She released her debut EP, Strong, in May 2010, followed by another EP, Laid Bare, in October 2010. A live recording, Alive, was released in 2011 via Judie Tzuke's official website.

In 2021, Tzuke became part of T.I.G.Y. (Thoughts I Give You), alongside Cambridge musician Matthew Racher.

== Discography ==
Albums/EPs

- Strong (2010)
- Laid Bare (2010)
- Alive (live recording) (2011)

Singles

Year	Title	Chart positions				Album
Year	Title	UK	NL	BEL	IRE	Album
2007	"Uninvited" (Freemasons feat. Bailey Tzuke)	8	4	5	50	Unmixed
2013	"All I Need" (Dimension feat. Bailey Tzuke)	-	-	-	-	Non-Album Single
