= Amanda Wilson =

English singer and songwriter (born 1990)

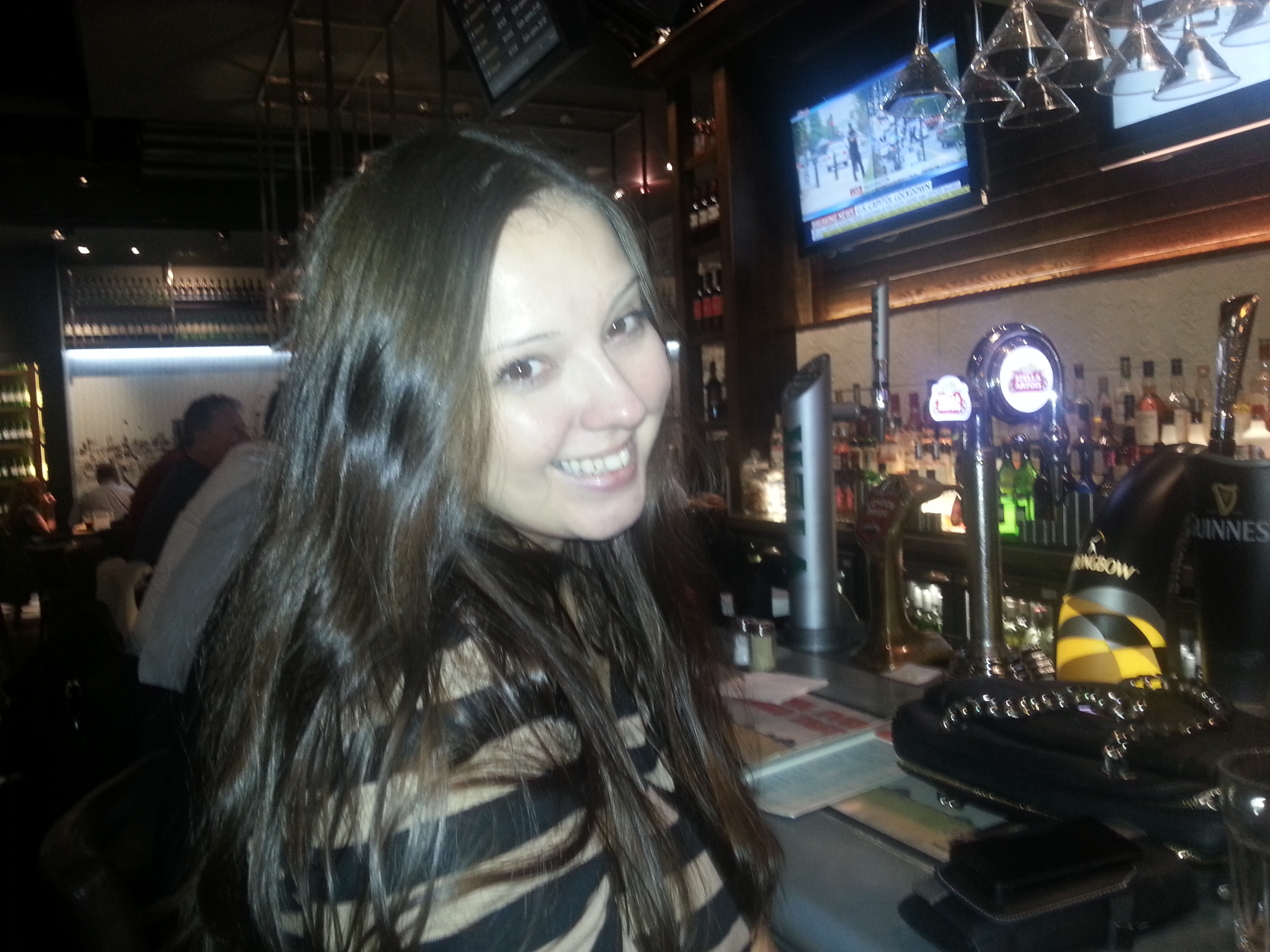
- Wilson in 2013

Background information
- Born: Amanda Leigh Wilson; 13 April 1980 (age 46)
- Origin: Peckham, London, England
- Genre: House
- Occupation: Singer
- Instrument: Vocals
- Years active: 2001–present
- Member of: Freemasons

Amanda Leigh Wilson (born 13 April 1980) is an English singer and songwriter. She is a member of house music act Freemasons. As part of the act she has scored two major UK hit singles, including "Love on My Mind", which went on to success in several European charts and the US Billboard Hot Dance Club Songs. Wilson also scored another major UK and worldwide smash hit working with Avicii and Samuele Sartini on the single "Seek Bromance" in 2010, which went on to be certified Platinum by BPI for selling over 600,000 units in the UK, and certified Gold in numerous countries across Europe.

== Biography ==
Wilson provided lead vocals on the track "When We Were in Love", which made it to the semi-final of The Great British Song Contest 1998 to select the UK's entry for the Eurovision Song Contest. Having been a session singer for many years, she was noticed by a record label who wanted to put her in touch with Freemasons.

Wilson provided lead vocals on many tracks on the Freemasons' album, Shakedown. Her biggest hit was the Freemasons track, "Love on My Mind", which reached number 11 in 2005 on the UK Singles Chart. The song sampled vocals from "This Time Baby" by Jackie Moore, and lyrics from "When The Heartache Is Over" by Tina Turner. Wilson's vocals on the track were electronically lowered in pitch to blend in with the sampled vocals of Jackie Moore.

Following her success with the Freemasons' first album, Wilson went on to provide lead vocals for their 2008 remix of Gusto's "Disco's Revenge", which gave her a third Top 40 hit in the UK (peaking at number 34). In 2019, French DJ David Guetta played a previously unreleased collaboration with Swedish DJ Avicii and Afrojack, with vocals from Wilson. Called "Before I Could Say Goodbye" by fans, the song was played as part of a tribute concert for Avicii and Guetta said that the collaboration was previously unreleased and would likely not be released.

== Discography ==
=== Albums ===
- 2012: Amanda Wilson

=== Singles ===
2005:

- "Love on My Mind" (with Freemasons)
- "Watchin'" (with Freemasons)

2006:

- "Electric Love" (with Glamour Katz)

2007:

- "I Feel Like" (with Freemasons)
- "Gotta Let Go" (with A. Lee)
- "Intoxicated" (with Raw)
- "Heaven in Your Eyes" (with Night Drive)
- "The Right Way" (with Wawa & Herd)
- "Lovin' U on 2 Me" (with Benoit Henriot)

2008:

- "Disco's Revenge" (with Gusto)
- "Good 4 Me" (with Daytone)
- "Pure Emotion" (with Mr Fix It)
- "Found A Miracle" (with Loveless)
- "Keep This Fire Burning" (with Outsiders)
- "Need in Me" (with Danny Dove & Steve Smart)
- "Love Resurrection" (with Aurora)
- "You're Not Good For Me" (with Roxy ST)
- "Falling For You" (with Soulcatcher)
- "Saturday" (with Weekend Lovers)
- "Something Gotta Give" (with Thomas Gold)
- "Break It Off" (with Audiostar)

2009:

- "The Right Way (Remixes)" (with Wawa & Herd)
- "Make It Real" (with Signs)
- "Surrender" (with Night Drive)
- "Spin It Again"
- "Just Because" (with Thomas Gold)
- "Underneath My Skin" (with Nick Bridges)

2010:

- "U Sure Do"
- "Satisfaction Guaranteed" (with Mr Sam and Andy Duguid)
- "Love U Seek" (with Samuele Sartini)
- "Caught Up" (with Paul Harris, Michael Gray, Jon Pearn)
- "Not Over You" (with Olav Basoski & Redroche)
- "Smile" (with Sound of Soho)
- "Another Minute"
- "Sometimes" (with Dim Chris)
- "Seek Bromance" (with Tim Berg (Wilson re-recorded the vocals from "Love U Seek" for Berg's "Bromance"))

2011:

- "You and I (On Ibiza)" (with Kalwi & Remi)
- "Back Again" (with Samuele Sartini)
- "You Found Me" (with Dim Chris)
- "Runaway" (with Chrizzo & Maxim)
- "Don't Throw It Away"

2012:

- "Doing It Right"(with Remady & Manu-L)
- "Breaking Up" (with Chuckie & Promise Land)
- "Touch The Sky" (with Provenzano DJ)

2013:

- "Im Still Breathing" (with Thiesen & Senza & James Durden)
- "I Am Changing" (with Mastiksoul)
- "I Need You" (with Kalwi & Remi)
- "Trust In Me" (with Paul Rudd)

2014:

- "Where My Heart Lives" (with Mike Lucas & Simon Beta)
- "Save The Day" (with Etostone)
- "Scared" (feat. Pitbull)

2016:

- "Stay" (with FTampa)

2017:

- "Taking Vocal" (with Stephen William Cornish)

2021:

- "Medicine" (with Samuele Sartini & Fedo Mora)

2023:

- "Waiting for You" (with Mistermiss)
