= Nothing but a Heartache =

1968 soul song

"Nothing but a Heartache" is a song written by Wayne Bickerton and Tony Waddington and performed by American vocal group The Flirtations, released by Deram Records in November 1968. The song was an hit in several nations, and is often classified as an example of Northern Soul.

== Commercial performance ==
"Nothing But a Heartache" reached the Top 40 in both the Netherlands (No. 33) and in the US, where it spent two weeks at No. 34 in late May 1969 during what was then considered a lengthy 14-week run on Billboard's Hot 100 – especially for a hit that did not reach the top 30. The single did, however, reach No. 31 on Cash Box and No. 25 on Record World.

In late April 1969, "Nothing but a Heartache" reached No. 3 in Boston on WRKO-AM. In Canada it reached No. 31 and in Australia it charted at No. 97. Two promotional videos—one on location and one in a studio; were filmed for the song. The location video was shot at Tintern Abbey in Wales.

== Charts ==
| Chart (1968–1969) | Peak position |
|---|---|
| Australia | 97 |
| Canada RPM Top Singles | 31 |
| Netherlands (Dutch Top 40) | 33 |
| U.S. Billboard Hot 100 | 34 |
| U.S. Cash Box Top 100 | 31 |
| U.S. Record World | 25 |

== Covers ==
- In 1988, Canadian singer/songwriter Carole Pope covered the song and released it as a single.
- In 1999, the Liquor Giants, led by former Gun Club guitarist Ward Dotson, recorded a version of the song which was given away on flexi-disc with issue #57 of The Bob Magazine.
- In October 2017, American punk rock/hip hop band the Transplants recorded it for their Take Cover EP.
- In 2007, the British dance duo Freemasons covered it for their album Shakedown.
