= Loaded Records =

British dance record label

Loaded Records was a British dance record label, formed in 1990 by Tim Jeffery and JC Reid. It launched artists like Pizzaman, Slacker and Wildchild. More recently, it released albums by Super Collider (featuring Jamie Lidell) and singles by Annie and Holden & Thompson. They also launched Skint Records as an offshoot.

The label enjoyed chart success again in 2005 with the Freemasons, who hit the top 20 with "Love On My Mind" and "Watchin'"; in both instances featuring Amanda Wilson.

Loaded and Skint Records were acquired by BMG in 2014.

== See also ==
- List of record labels
- List of electronic music record labels
