= Alan Williams (singer) =

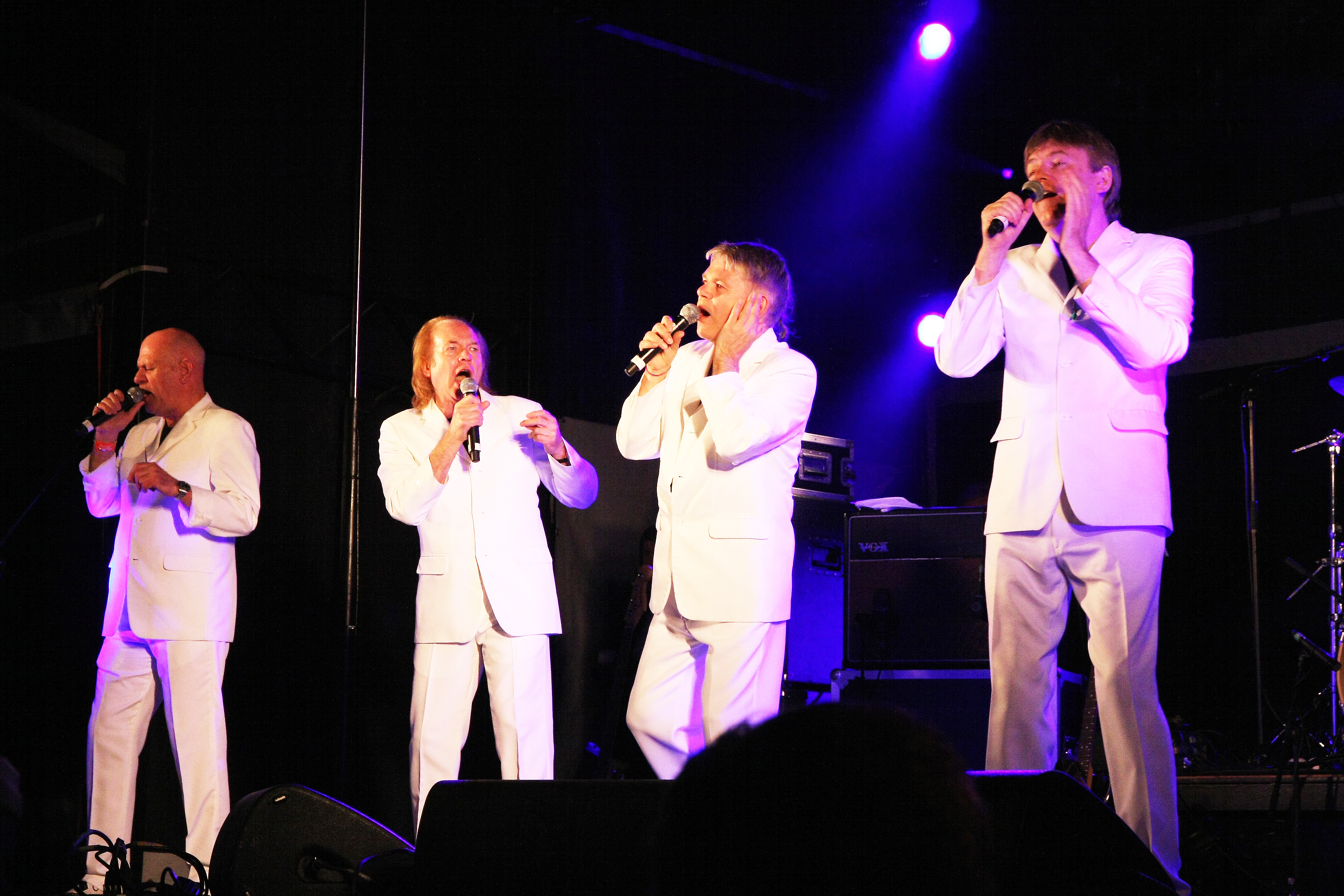
- Alan Williams

Background information
- Born: 22 December 1948 (age 77); Welwyn Garden City, Hertfordshire, England
- Genre: Glam rock
- Instruments: Vocals, guitar
- Member of: The Rubettes

Alan Williams (born 22 December 1948) is an English singer. He is the former lead singer for The Rubettes and now fronts his own Rubettes spinoff "The Rubettes featuring Alan Williams".

== Career ==
Williams' first break was joining the semi-pro East London band The Unsuited Medium, fronted by Chick Fraser. Williams' next band, The Medium, included John Richardson on drums. Williams and Richardson were both in The Rubettes, both before this they were the duo "Baskin & Copperfield". Baskin & Copperfield never charted in the UK, but appeared on Top of the Pops and Hits à Go-Go with the song "I Never See The Sun".

Williams replaced Paul Da Vinci as lead singer of The Rubettes, as he was the only session singer who could replicate Da Vinci's falsetto vocals. "Sugar Baby Love", which became the group's most successful song, went to number 1 in the U.K. Subsequent songs, such as "I Can Do It" and "Juke Box Jive", are sung by Williams.

The Rubettes disbanded in 2000, and not that long after Williams recreated The Rubettes with Mick Clarke and John Richardson of the original members. Bill Hurd, original pianist, also recreated the band around the same time as Alan with Paul Da Vinci, and in 2002, the two went to court for reasons surrounding ownership of the "Rubettes" name. The final agreement was that both musicians could tour under the name, as long it specified which of the two was fronting the group.

In 2005, Williams sued Hurd, claiming he breached the terms on the original contract, after he learned he appeared on German television as "The Rubettes", without any sign that this band was "featuring Bill Hurd". The court ruled that Williams also breached the contracts agreements as well as Hurd, but since Hurd's abuse of the contract was more severe, Williams ultimately won the case.

In July 2022, Williams was sued by former bandmates John Richardson and Mick Clarke, who had also been in Alan's Rubettes. Williams won the case. He and Hurd continue to lead their own Rubettes band.
