= Angelle (singer) =

British singer (born 1979 or 1980)

- Also known as: Sarah Bennett
- Born: Sarah Davies; 1979 or 1980 (age 46–47); Stafford, Staffordshire, England
- Origin: Birmingham, West Midlands, England
- Occupations: Singer; entrepreneur
- Spouse: Steve Bennett (m. 2016)

Sarah Bennett (née Davies; born 1979 or 1980), known professionally as Angelle, is a British singer from Birmingham, England. In 2002, after providing vocals for a cover version of "The Lion Sleeps Tonight" for Jungle.com, she met Steve Bennett, who paid for her to be the subject of Vibe TV; a single, "Joy and Pain", was released in August 2002, and charted at No. 43 on the UK Singles Chart. She and Bennett later founded Gems TV, and would appear on the Sunday Times Rich List 2017.

== Life and career ==
=== Early life ===
Davies was born in Stafford, and attended Highclare School, which she left after completing her General Certificates of Secondary Education aged fifteen to concentrate on her music career; she spent this period entering competitions, singing in bars, supporting comedians such as Jim Davidson and Bobby Davro as the musical act in their club performances, and touring with 1960s pop acts such as Gerry and the Pacemakers. She signed to First Avenue Records, a sublabel of Arista Records, aged seventeen, and adopted the moniker Angel, which she used for four years; in 1998, the American band Angel reformed, prompting her to change her stage name to Angelle.

After meeting Paul Da Vinci, the lead singer of the Rubettes, he hired her to record demo tracks for Eternal and Louise Redknapp; she later recorded background vocals for Peter Andre and four songs for herself. Around this time, she moved to Essex. Shortly before First Avenue was due to release one of hers, Arista dropped a large number of First Avenue artists, prompting Davies to move back to Birmingham, and take up a post at the Hilton Birmingham Metropole. In February 2000, Davies met Da Vinci again, who hired her to sing on a cover version of "The Lion Sleeps Tonight" for Steve Bennett's Jungle.com; after Bennett heard it, he signed her, and the following month she set about writing and recording, with Bennett hiring Ian Mills to coach her. Davies and Bennett later entered into a relationship in early 2001.

=== Vibe TV ===
In 2002, after Bennett rented a home-shopping channel due for launch in November, Vibe TV, he decided to use the channel to promote Angelle, and compiled a series of programmes to run on loop. Initial programming included "Angelle: The Paul King Interview", "Angelle: Behind the Music", a profile of Angelle, "The Making of Angel", which charted coverage of the channel, and "Angelle: My Week", a vlog; later programming included "Angelle in Concert", a slick studio production which featured a lip-synching Angelle with six dancers, a six-piece band, four backing vocalists, and multiple costume changes, and "Joy and Pain - the Remixes". Colin Paterson wrote a scathing review for the Guardian in August 2002, singling out the ballads of "Angelle in Concert", "The Paul King Interview", "Angelle: Behind the Music", and "Joy and Pain - the Remixes" for particular criticism. "Joy and Pain" was released in August 2002, alongside a remix from Flip & Fill; upon release, the single spent a week at No. 43 before dropping out of the UK top 75. She then took up designing children's clothes. In 2004, Davies and Bennett, her now-husband, set up Gems TV, a shopping channel selling gemstones using reverse auctions; the venture proved popular, and in May 2017, she and Bennett made the Sunday Times Rich List 2017 at No. 938, by which time Davies and Bennett had had five children together.
