= List of A&M Records artists =

List of artists who recorded for A&M Records

This is a list of artists who recorded for A&M Records.
Listed in parentheses are the names of A&M-affiliated labels for which the artist recorded.

== 0–9 ==
- 16 Horsepower
- The 28th Street Crew (Vendetta/A&M)
- 3rd Party (DV8/A&M)
- .38 Special
- 4 Runner
- 52nd Street

== A ==
- Mick Abrahams
- Automatic 7
- A Certain Ratio
- Bryan Adams
- Alessi Brothers
- Peter Allen
- María Conchita Alonso
- Herb Alpert
- Herb Alpert & the Tijuana Brass
- Apink (IST Entertainment/A&M)
- Jann Arden
- Armageddon
- Joan Armatrading
- Athletico Spizz 80
- Atlantic Starr
- Hoyt Axton
- Ayers Rock
- Ayọ
- Steve Azar (River North/A&M)

== B ==
- Burt Bacharach
- Bad Boys Inc
- The Badlees (Atlas/A&M)
- Henry Badowski
- David Baerwald
- Joan Baez
- Baja Marimba Band
- David Batteau
- Arthur Baker
- Gato Barbieri
- Bass is Base
- Bazuka
- Véronique Béliveau (Canada)
- Bell & James
- Marc Benno
- George Benson
- Big Pig
- Big Sugar
- Black
- Black Eyed Peas (will.i.am/A&M)
- Blodwyn Pig
- The Blue Nile (US)
- Blues Traveler
- The Bluetones
- Boys Republic (Rainbow/A&M)
- Brigid Boden
- Booker T. & Priscilla
- Boy Meets Girl
- Boyce and Hart
- Liona Boyd
- The Brat Pack (Vendetta/A&M)
- Breathe (Virgin/A&M) (US)
- Brewer & Shipley
- Sarah Brightman
- Elkie Brooks
- The Brothers Johnson
- Charity Brown
- Dennis Brown
- James Brown
- Sam Brown
- Chris de Burgh
- Burlap to Cashmere
- Glen Burtnik
- Butterfly Boucher

== C ==
- John Cale
- Captain & Tennille
- Captain Beefheart
- Captain Sensible
- Vanessa Carlton
- Kim Carnes
- Carpenters
- Karen Carpenter
- Richard Carpenter
- Dina Carroll
- The Caulfields
- A Certain Ratio
- Checkmates, Ltd.
- Cheech & Chong (Ode/A&M)
- Don Cherry
- Toni Childs
- Chilliwack
- China Crisis
- Gene Clark
- Jimmy Cliff
- Bruce Cockburn
- Joe Cocker (A&M North America)
- Cold
- Ornette Coleman
- Concrete Blonde (I.R.S./A&M)
- Rita Coolidge
- Stewart Copeland
- Chris Cornell
- David Crosby
- Sheryl Crow
- Billy Crystal
- Tony Camillo's Bazuka
- Cud
- Tim Curry

== D ==
- Elizabeth Daily
- Daley
- Dancer
- Michael Damian (Cypress/A&M)
- David & David
- Davis Daniel
- Deadly Venoms
- Dean (Cube/A&M)
- Chris de Burgh
- DeeDeee (A&M Menado)
- Del Amitri
- Sandy Denny
- Paul Desmond
- Barry De Vorzon
- Dennis DeYoung
- Jim Diamond
- The Dickies
- Difford and Tilbrook
- Dillard & Clark
- Dishwalla
- Doc Holliday
- Dodgy
- Double (US, leased from Polydor)
- The Dream Syndicate
- Driveblind
- Drop City Yacht Club (Exit 8/A&M/Octone)
- Dropping Daylight (Octone/A&M)
- Dub Pistols (1500/A&M)
- Dubstar (Polydor/A&M)
- Duffy (except US)
- Judith Durham
- Dred Scott (rapper)

== E ==
- Earth Quake
- Billy Eckstine
- England Dan & John Ford Coley
- Enormous
- Envy & Other Sins
- Epex (C9 Entertainment/Interscope/A&M)
- Espionage
- The Europeans
- Extreme

== F ==
- Face to Face
- The Faders (Polydor/A&M)
- Fairport Convention
- Falco (A&M North America)
- The Feelies
- Fergie (will.i.am/A&M)
- Fig Dish
- Tim Finn (US/Canada)
- Flying Burrito Brothers
- Flyleaf (Octone/A&M)
- For Real (Perspective/A&M)
- Peter Frampton
- Free (North America)
- Lewis Furey

== G ==
- Gallagher and Lyle
- Giant
- Giant Steps
- Gin Blossoms
- The Go-Go's (I.R.S./A&M)
- God Lives Underwater
- Gold
- Lesley Gore
- Graham Gouldman
- The Graces
- Kat Graham
- Amy Grant (Myrrh/A&M)
- Al Green
- Patty Griffin
- Scott Grimes
- Henry Gross
- Gun

== H ==
- Jim Hall
- Lani Hall
- Richie Havens
- Murray Head
- Head East
- The Headpins (Solid Gold/A&M Canada)
- Richard X. Heyman (Cypress/A&M)
- John Hiatt
- Rupert Hine
- Robyn Hitchcock and the Egyptians
- Roger Hodgson
- David Holmes (1500/A&M)
- Holy Soldier (eponymous debut album only, co-released with Myrrh Records)
- Hoodoo Gurus
- Hookfoot
- Hope
- Marques Houston
- Hudson Ford
- The Human League (Virgin/A&M US)
- Humble Pie
- Hummingbird
- Paul Hyde and the Payolas

== I ==
- James Ingram
- The Innocence Mission
- Intelligent Hoodlum

== J ==
- Jackopierce
- Susan Jacks (Casino/A&M Canada)
- Terry Jacks
- Janet Jackson
- Joe Jackson
- Chas Jankel
- Tom Jans
- Garland Jeffreys
- Waylon Jennings
- Antonio Carlos Jobim
- Howard Johnson
- Pete Jolly
- Booker T. Jones
- Lexi Jones
- Marti Jones
- Quincy Jones
- Jesse Johnson
- Jonzun Crew
- Michael Jonzun
- Maurice Joshua (Vendetta/A&M)
- Joya (Perspective/A&M)

== K ==
- Keel (Gold Mountain/A&M)
- Toby Keith
- Paul Kelly
- Kiddo
- Andy Kim (A&M Canada)
- Carole King
- King Harvest
- Kitchens of Distinction (One Little Indian/A&M) (US)
- K'naan (Octone/A&M)
- Jerry Knight
- Steve Kolander (River North/A&M)
- Kurupt (ANTRA/A&M)

== L ==
- Annabel Lamb
- Jonny Lang
- Denis Leary
- Peggy Lee
- Albert Lee
- Arthur Lee
- Lee Seung-Cheol (A&M Japan)
- Little Nell
- Charles Lloyd
- Lo-Key (Perspective/A&M)
- Lodgic
- Nils Lofgren
- Claudine Longet
- Denise Lopez (Vendetta/A&M)
- Love Battery (Atlas/A&M)
- The Lover Speaks
- L.T.D.
- The Lucy Show
- Lustre
- Lutefisk

== M ==
- Ashley MacIsaac
- Magma
- Majestic Warriors (Tabu/A&M)
- Chuck Mangione
- Gap Mangione
- Billy Mann (DV8/A&M)
- Herbie Mann
- Maroon 5 (Octone/A&M)
- Steve Marriott
- Nancy Martinez (Vendetta/A&M)
- Groucho Marx
- Hugh Masekela
- Letta Mbulu
- Bob McGrath
- Bonnie McKee
- Sister Janet Mead
- Glenn Medeiros
- Bill Medley
- Sérgio Mendes
- Mental As Anything
- The Merry-Go-Round
- Lee Michaels
- Liza Minnelli
- Mint Condition (Perspective/A&M)
- Monster Magnet
- Chris Montez
- Wes Montgomery
- Betty Moon
- The Move
- Gerry Mulligan
- Samantha Mumba (Polydor/A&M)
- Michael Murphey
- MxPx
- Mýa

== N ==
- Milton Nascimento
- Nazareth (US)
- NCT 127 (U-Cube/A&M)
- Ann Nesby (Perspective/A&M)
- Aaron Neville
- Neville Brothers
- New Riders of the Purple Sage
- Nirvana: Nevermind (1991 album, 30th Anniversary Edition 1991–2021)
- Laura Nyro (Cypress/A&M)

== O ==
- Philip Oakey and Giorgio Moroder (Virgin/A&M) (US)
- Carroll O'Connor
- Hazel O'Connor
- Alexander O'Neal (Tabu/A&M)
- Shaquille O'Neal (TWIsM/A&M)
- Phil Ochs
- Offenbach (A&M Canada)
- Oingo Boingo
- Old Hickory
- One 2 Many
- Orbit
- Orchestral Manoeuvres in the Dark (Virgin/A&M) (US)
- Jeffrey Osborne
- Overweight Pooch
- Ozark Mountain Daredevils

== P ==
- Pablo Cruise
- The Pale
- Paper Tongues
- Felix Pappalardi and Creation
- The Parade
- Payolas
- Charlie Peacock
- CeCe Peniston
- Fred Penner
- Persuasions
- Shawn Phillips
- The Police
- Iggy Pop
- Billy Porter (DV8/A&M)
- Billy Preston
- Procol Harum (US)
- Public Announcement
- The Pussycat Dolls (Interscope/A&M)
- Paw

== Q ==
- Queen (Hollywood/A&M) (Canada)
- Queen Latifah (Flavor Unit/Creative Battery/AEG Live/A&M)

== R ==
- The Raes
- Raffi (Shoreline/A&M) (US)
- Billy Rankin
- Tommy Reilly
- Emitt Rhodes
- Miguel Rios
- Nicola Roberts
- Rockie Robbins
- Jimmie Rodgers
- The Rolling Stones
- The Ronettes
- Brenda Russell

== S ==
- Astrid S
- S Club 7 (Polydor/A&M US)
- Sad Café (US/Canada)
- The Sandpipers
- Nicole Scherzinger (Interscope/A&M)
- Bob Schneider
- Steve Scott
- Seatrain
- Seawind
- Seduction (Vendetta/A&M)
- Michael Sembello
- Shango
- Roxanne Shanté (A&M UK & Éire)
- Feargal Sharkey (A&M US)
- Sharon, Lois & Bram (Elephant/A&M Canada)
- Tommy Shaw
- Ben Sidran
- Simian Mobile Disco
- Simple Minds (Virgin/A&M) (US)
- Smooth (Perspective/A&M)
- Snow Patrol (Polydor/A&M)
- Sounds of Blackness (Perspective/A&M)
- Soundgarden
- David Spinozza
- Splinter (Dark Horse/A&M)
- Split Enz (outside Australia/New Zealand)
- The Spizzles
- Spooky Tooth (US/Canada)
- Squeeze
- Status Quo (A&M US)
- Stealers Wheel
- Cat Stevens (A&M North America)
- Sting
- Strafe
- The Stranglers (A&M US)
- Strawbs
- Styx
- Andy Summers
- Andy Summers and Robert Fripp
- Sun Ra
- SuperHeavy
- Supertramp
- Swervedriver
- The Swimming Pool Q's

== T ==
- Ta Mara and the Seen
- Tarney Spencer Band
- Temple of the Dog
- Bobby Tench
- Jean Terrell
- Sonny Terry and Brownie McGhee
- Therapy?
- Marlo Thomas
- Ali Thomson
- Michael Tolcher (Octone/A&M)
- Tom Gurl Four (TUG/A&M)
- Tora Tora
- Total Eclipse (Tabu/A&M)
- Tower of Power (Cypress/A&M)
- T. Rex (US)
- The Tubes
- Ike & Tina Turner

== U ==
- UB40 (Virgin/A&M) (US)
- Ugly Duckling (1500/A&M)

== V ==
- Valdy (A&M Canada)
- Melvin Van Peebles
- Gino Vannelli
- Suzanne Vega
- Rosie Vela
- Vesta
- Vital Signs
- Victoria (A&M/Interscope)

== W ==
- The Wagoneers
- Rick Wakeman
- The Wanted
- WaT (A&M Japan)
- Johnny "Guitar" Watson
- Julius Wechter & the Baja Marimba Band
- We Five
- Tim Weisberg
- Cory Wells
- West End one of a series of aliases for producer Eddie Gordon, all under dance label AM:PM
- West End Girls (A&M Canada)
- Caron Wheeler (Perspective/A&M)
- Barry White
- David Wilcox
- Paul Williams
- Shanice Wilson
- Paul Winter
- Bill Withers
- Gary Wright
- Bill Wyman
- will.i.am (will.i.am Music Group/A&M)

== Y ==
- Y&T
- Yellow Magic Orchestra

== Z ==
- Lenny Zakatek
- Zakiya (DV8/A&M)
