= Enormous =

Enormous may refer to:

- Enormous (band), an indie, power pop band from Derby, England.
- Enormous (song), a 2017 song by American rapper Gucci Mane.
