= Hudson Ford =

English rock band

- Origin: England
- Genres: Rock; Progressive rock
- Years active: 1973–1977
- Label: A&M
- Past members: John Ford; Richard Hudson; Chris Parren; Mickey Keen; Gerry Conway; Ken Laws; Mick Clarke

Hudson Ford were an English rock band, formed when John Ford and Richard Hudson left Strawbs in 1973.

Hudson and Ford had been in Elmer Gantry's Velvet Opera in the mid 1960s and they both left that group and joined Strawbs, where they stayed until forming Hudson Ford.

The original line-up featured Hudson (now playing guitar instead of drums) and Ford along with Chris Parren on keyboards, Mickey Keen on guitars, and Gerry Conway on drums. Conway left in May 1974 prior to the recording of Free Spirit and was replaced by Ken Laws. Mickey Keen left the band in December 1974 and was replaced briefly by Mick Clarke, formerly of The Roy Young Band. Clarke moved to the United States in 1975 and was not replaced. The line-up remained stable from that point until the group dissolved in late 1977.

The first album Nickelodeon also featured session musicians including Rick Wakeman.

In 1979, they re-surfaced billed as The Monks.

== Personnel ==
- John Ford – vocals, bass guitar, guitar (1973-1977)
- Richard Hudson – vocals, guitar, sitar (1973-1977)
- Chris Parren – keyboards (1973-1977)
- Mickey Keen - guitar (1973-1974; died 2008)
- Gerry Conway - drums (1973-1974)
- Ken Laws – drums (1974-1977; died 2007)
- Mick Clarke - guitar (1974-1975)

Hudson Ford / The Monks Timeline

== Discography ==
=== Albums ===
- Nickelodeon (A&M 1973)
- Free Spirit (A&M 1974)
- Worlds Collide (A&M 1975)
- Repertoire (1976) - compilation
- Daylight (1977)
- Hudson Ford - The A&M Albums (Universal Music Group/Caroline Records 2017)

=== Singles ===
Year	Single	Peak chart positions	
Year	Single	UK	AUS
1973	"Pick Up the Pieces"	8	―
1973	"Take It Back"	―	―
1974	"Burn Baby Burn"	15	94
1974	"Floating in the Wind"	35	―
1974	"Free Spirit"	―	―
1975	"When Love Has Overgrown"	―	―
1976	"Waterfall"	―	―
1976	"95° in the Shade"	―	―
1976	"Sold On Love"	―	―
1977	"Kiss in the Dark"	―	―
1977	"Are You Dancing"	―	―
"—" denotes releases that did not chart or were not released.

== See also ==
- List of performers on Top of the Pops
- List of former A&M Records artists
