= We Can Do It (album) =

Studio album by The Rubettes
- Released: March 1975
- Genre: Pop rock; glam rock
- Length: 38:07; 44:25 (with bonus tracks)
- Label: State Records/Polydor Records
- Producer: Wayne Bickerton, Tony Waddington

The Rubettes chronology
Wear It's 'At (1974)	We Can Do It (1975)	Rubettes (1975)

We Can Do It is the second studio album by the English glam rock band The Rubettes, released on the State Records label in March 1975. The album reached no 41 in the UK charts and contained two UK top 10 hits – "I Can Do It" and "Juke Box Jive".

In 1992, Dice Records (France) released the Rubettes' first two albums (Wear It's 'At and We Can Do It) as a double CD set. In 2015, Caroline Records released the album We Can Do It, including two bonus tracks, as part of a box CD set of the Rubettes' first five studio albums.

== Track listing ==
Side 1

1. "I Can Do It" (Wayne Bickerton, Tony Waddington) – 3:21
2. "The Sha-Na-Na-Na Song" (Wayne Bickerton, Tony Waddington) – 2:59
3. "Something's Coming Over Me" (Bill Hurd) – 2:39
4. "The Family Affair" (Bill Hurd) – 2:48
5. "It's Just Make Believe" (Wayne Bickerton, Tony Waddington) – 3:17
6. "Dance To The Rock 'n' Roll" (Mick Clarke) – 3:21

Side 2

1. "Juke Box Jive" (Wayne Bickerton, Tony Waddington) – 3:00
2. "Don't Do It Baby" (Wayne Bickerton, Tony Waddington) – 3:44
3. "I'll Always Love You" (Mick Clarke) – 3:40
4. "At The High School Hop Tonight" (Wayne Bickerton, Tony Waddington) – 2:42
5. "Wo Goddam Blues" (John Richardson, Alan Williams) – 3:01
6. "Beggar Man" (John Richardson, Alan Williams) – 3:35

== 2015 CD bonus tracks ==
13. "When You're Falling In Love" (John Richardson, Alan Williams) – 3:02
14. "If You've Got The Time" (John Richardson, Alan Williams) – 3:16

NB: Track times taken from 2015 CD

== Singles ==
1. "Juke Box Jive" b/w "When You're Falling in Love" – November 1974 – UK No. 3
2. "I Can Do It" b/w "If You've Got The Time" – March 1975 – UK No. 7

== Rubettes personnel ==
- Alan Williams – Electric guitar, acoustic guitar and vocals
- Mick Clarke – Bass guitar and vocals
- Tony Thorpe – Electric guitar, acoustic guitar and vocals
- John Richardson – Drums, percussion and vocals
- Bill Hurd – Piano, electric piano and vocals

== Publishers (Including Bonus Tracks) ==
- Track 1 – Pamscene Ltd/Sony-ATV Music/Warner Bros. Music
- Tracks 2 & 8 – Warner-Chappell Music/Jastian Music
- Tracks 3, 4, 6 & 9 – State Music
- Track 5 – Arlovol Music/Penny Farthing Music/Bucks Music
- Tracks 7, 12, 13 & 14 – Sony-ATV Music
- Track 10 – Pamscene Ltd/Sony-ATV Music
- Track 11 – Belwin Mills

== Production and credits ==
- Produced by Wayne Bickerton and Tony Waddington
- Arranged by Richard Hewson
- Sound engineers – Dave Grinstead (Chipping Norton) and John Mackswith (Lansdowne Studios)
- Cutting Engineer – Melvin Abrahams
- Photography – Mike Leale
