= Rokotto =

British funk band

- Origin: Dundee, Scotland
- Genres: Britfunk
- Years active: 1975–81
- Label: State Records
- Past members: Sister B (vocals); Hugh Paul (vocals); Cleveland Walker (vocals); Derek Henderson (guitar); Owen "Lloyd" Wisdom (bass); Stewart Garden (keyboards); Howard "Bongo" Macleod (drums)

Rokotto was a Britfunk band from Dundee, Scotland, active in the late 1970s. It was made up of vocalists Sister B (Lorna Bannon), Hugh Paul, and Cleveland Walker, backed by guitarist Derek Henderson, bassist Owen Wisdom, keyboardist Stewart Garden, and drummer Bongo Macleod.

== Overview ==
The band was formed in September 1975, when Caribbean musicians McLeod, Walker, and Wisdom travelled to Dundee as part of a steel drum band, and fell in with musicians on the local funk scene; the name Rokotto being "the word for 'making love' in some African dialect". The band soon gained a residency at Ronnie Scott's club in London and in August 1976 signed to State Records,

The band made its television debut on ITV show The Entertainers on 10 April 1977, the episode consisting of 30 minutes of a concert. Rokotto enjoyed two hits in the UK singles chart; "Boogie On Up", which reached number 40 in November 1977, and "Funk Theory", which reached number 49 the following June, the band performing each single on Top of the Pops.

The band's final single releases came in 1981. McLeod and Walker later formed the funk band McLeod, Sister B - under a new nom de disque, Lorna B - became a backing vocalist and singer on television themes (including children's' television show Fun House) and adverts, and also sang with Shakatak on the Night Birds album. In 1995 she scored a pair of top 40 hits as guest vocalist with DJ Scott.
