= Rubettes (album) =

Studio album by The Rubettes
- Released: November 1975
- Genre: Rock and roll; glam rock
- Length: 41:32; 51:08 (with bonus tracks)
- Label: State Records/Polydor Records
- Producer: Wayne Bickerton, Tony Waddington

The Rubettes chronology
We Can Do It (1975)	Rubettes (1975)	Sign Of The Times (1976)

Rubettes is the third studio album by the English glam rock band The Rubettes, released on the State Records label in November 1975, their third studio album release within 12 months. It was the last Rubettes album produced by Wayne Bickerton and Tony Waddington.The album contained two UK top 40 hits - Foe Dee O Dee and Little Darling.
In 1992, Dice Records (France) released the Rubettes' third and fourth albums (Rubettes and Sign Of The Times) as a double CD set. In 2015, Caroline Records released the album Rubettes, with three bonus tracks, as part of a box CD set of the Rubettes' first five studio albums.

== Track listing ==
Side 1

1. "Judy Run Run" (Wayne Bickerton, Tony Waddington) - 3:04
2. "Little Darling" (Wayne Bickerton, Tony Waddington) - 3:20
3. "My Buddy Holly Days" (John Richardson, Alan Williams) - 3:15
4. "Put A Back Beat To That Music" (Wayne Bickerton, Tony Waddington) - 3:39
5. "It's Better That Way" (John Richardson, Alan Williams) - 3:49
6. "Play The Game" (Bill Hurd) - 2:59

Side 2

1. "Foe-Dee-O-Dee" (Wayne Bickerton, Tony Waddington) - 3:01
2. "I'm Just Dreaming" (Wayne Bickerton, Tony Waddington) - 3:06
3. "Out In The Cold" (Bill Hurd) - 3:22
4. "Miss Goodie Two Shoes" (John Richardson, Alan Williams) - 3:41
5. "When You're Around" (Mick Clarke) - 4:13
6. "Dark Side Of The World" (Wayne Bickerton, Tony Waddington) - 4:03

=== 2015 CD bonus tracks ===
Rubettes:

13. "With You" (John Richardson, Alan Williams) - 2:16

Alan and John*:

14. "I Still Love You" (John Richardson, Alan Williams) - 4:02
15. "Love Bonds" (Richardson & Richardson) - 3:18
*Produced by Alan Blakley

NB: All track times taken from 2015 CD

== Singles ==
1. "Foe-Dee-O-Dee" b/w "With You" - June 1975 - UK #15
2. "Little Darling" b/w "Miss Goodie Two Shoes" - October 1975 - UK #30

=== Bonus tracks single ===
Bonus tracks 14 & 15 were also released as a single:
"I Still Love You" b/w "Love Bonds" (as Alan and John) - November 1975

== Personnel ==
- Mick Clarke
- Tony Thorpe
- John Richardson
- Bill Hurd
- Alan Williams

== Publishers (including bonus tracks) ==
- Tracks 1, 2, 7 & 8 - Warner Bros Music/Warner Chappell Music/Arlovol Music/Penny Farthing Music
- Tracks 3, 4, 5 & 13 - Sony-ATV Music
- Tracks 6, 9 & 11 - State Music
- Track 10 - Pamscene Ltd/Sony-ATV Music
- Track 12 - Arlovol Music/Penny Farthing Music/Warner Bros Music
- Tracks 14 & 15 - Halcyon Music

== Production and credits ==
- Produced by Wayne Bickerton and Tony Waddington
- Engineer - John Mackswith
- Assistant Engineer - Super Hugh
- Art Direction/Concept - Paul Welch
- Front Photography - Sanders
- Back Photography - Alec Burn
