= Mick Clarke (musician) =

British blues musician (born 1950)

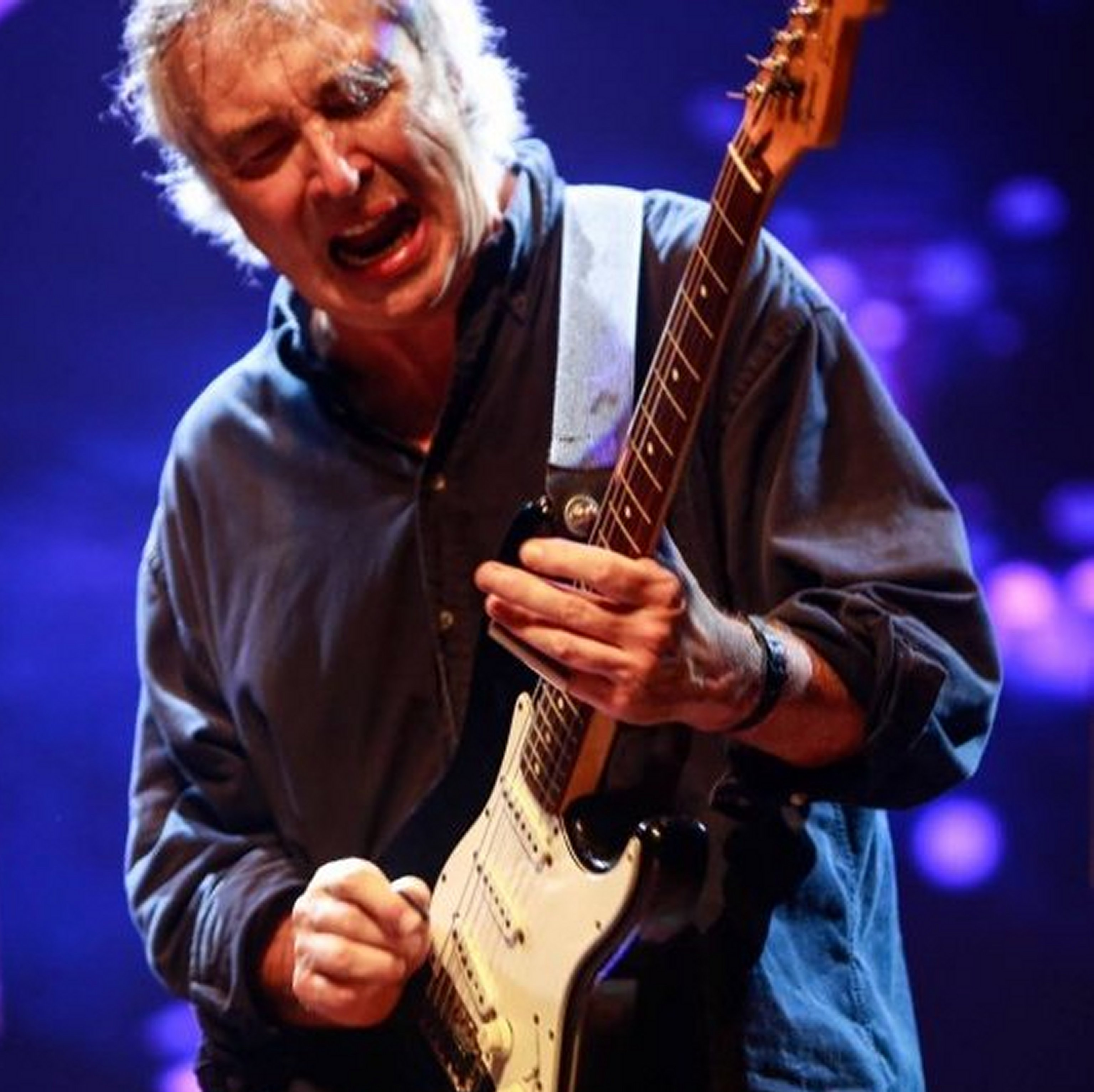
- Mick Clarke at the Simply The Blues Festival, Mumbai, India in 2014.

Background information
- Born: 12 July 1950 (age 76); Merton Park, London
- Genres: Blues rock, garage rock, pop rock
- Occupation: Musician
- Instrument: Guitar
- Years active: 1968–present
- Labels: Sire Records; Spark Records; Penny Farthing Records; Appaloosa Records; Rockfold Records; Brambus Records; BGO Records
- Website: Official website

Mick Clarke (born 12 July 1950) is a British blues rock and pop rock guitarist and songwriter based in Surrey, England. He is a founding member of the British band Killing Floor. He also co-founded SALT in 1975 and The Mick Clarke Band in the early 1980s. Clarke began his professional music career in 1968 and has released 22 solo albums as well as four studio albums with Killing Floor on various record labels.

== Life and career ==
Clarke was born to Fred and Vie Clarke, in 1950, in Merton Park, London. He attended Rutlish Grammar School where he took violin lessons and joined the school orchestra. In 1964, Clarke formed Stonewall Blues Band with his school friends and performed at local youth clubs. In 1966, he left Rutlish Grammar School and joined Advision Studios as an assistant engineer where he worked on sessions with Vic Flick, Big Jim Sullivan, Jimmy Page, Graham Bond and others.

In 1968, Clarke formed Killing Floor with Bill Thorndycraft in London. Stuart McDonald, Bazz Smith and Lou Martin joined the band later that year. In 1969, the band recorded their first album Killing Floor which was released on Spark Records as well as Sire Records in the United States. Later that year, the band toured to multiple locations in England alongside Howlin' Wolf, Otis Spann and Freddie King. Killing Floor toured in Europe several times, and played with The Nice and Black Sabbath at the Hamburg Easter Festival in 1970. The same year, the band released their second album Out of Uranus on Penny Farthing Records.

In October 1971, Clarke joined Funky Fever, a rock band formed by Lenny Zakatek and toured extensively with them to Germany and the United Kingdom. In 1972, Clarke performed with Killing Floor at Huntington College in London after which Killing Floor disbanded and did not perform for the next 32 years. Later that year, he joined Cliff Bennett's band Toefat along with Lou Martin. Toefat released their first single Brand New Band shortly which received good airplay on British radio.

Between 1973 and July 1974, Clarke joined Daddy Longlegs who were signed with Vertigo Records and continued to gig with them. In 1975, Clarke formed a new band, SALT with Steve Smith, Stuart McDonald and Tony Fernandez. From 1975 to 1977, SALT toured across England and Germany and played at multiple locations including at the Reading and Leeds Festivals, the biggest festival in England at the time. By the end of 1978, SALT disbanded and Clarke moved to California.

Clarke returned to London in the early 1980s and formed The Mick Clarke Band. In 1984, he was offered a deal with an Italian record company, Appaloosa Records. Three albums were released subsequently; Looking For Trouble in 1984, Rock Me in 1986 and All These Blues in 1988. During those years, Clarke performed at various festivals and concerts throughout Europe including Italy, The Netherlands and Belgium.

Between 1986 and 1989, Clarke toured to the United States with his band and performed at various locations including concerts with C. J. Chenier and Linda Hopkins in Los Angeles, California, with Johnny Winter in Olympia, Washington and with Canned Heat in Eugene, Oregon. Subsequently, an album with the name West Coast Connection was released in 1989 by Brambus Records.

In 1991, Mike Vernon produced Clarke's fifth album, Steel and Fire which was released on the German label Line Records as well as on the British label BGO Records. Steel and Fire was followed by Tell the Truth in 1991 and No Compromise in 1993. Tracks from No Compromise spent six weeks on the Virgin Radio playlist in the United Kingdom. Roll Again featuring Chris Sharley, Lou Martin and Dave Newman was released on Taxim Records and BGO in 1995.

In 1998, Lou Martin and Clarke collaborated for a duo album Happy Home followed by the release of New Mountain featuring Chris Sharley, Lou Martin and Ian Ellis in 2000. In 2004, Killing Floor recorded and released their reunion album, Zero Tolerance featuring all the band members including Clarke. The album was released by Appaloosa Records after which the band travelled and performed at various festivals around Europe. In the meanwhile, Clarke toured with The Mick Clarke Band to England and Luxembourg. They played with Bo Diddley at the Big Blues Festival in Luxembourg which was released as an album, Live in Luxembourg, in 2003, and with The Yardbirds at the Rocking The Blues Festival in England.

After a pause of five years, Solid Ground was released on the German label Taxim Records, in 2008. The Rambunctious Blues Experiment featuring the drummer, Russell Chaney, was released in 2011. Later that year, Clarke embarked on the project for reforming SALT and subsequently an album, The Cobra's Melodies, was released featuring all the band members. In 2012, Clarke toured India and played at the Simply The Blues festivals in Mumbai and Bangalore.

In 2013, Clarke produced and recorded Ramdango which was released by BGO. Between 2014 and 2021, Clarke produced nine albums that were released by BGO including one album with Killing Floor known as Rock'n'Roll Gone Mad released on Rockfold Records. In 2018, Clarke toured Sweden and played at Sweden Rock Festival with The Mick Clarke Band.

== Discography ==
Mick Clarke
Year	Title	Label & Country
1984	Looking For Trouble	Appaloosa (Italy)
1986	Rock Me	Appaloosa (Italy)
1988	All These Blues	Appaloosa (Italy)
1989	West Coast Connection	Brambus (Switzerland); NebulaCircle (USA) <be> BGO (UK)
1990	Steel and Fire	Line (Germany); Burnside (USA); BGO (UK)
1991	Tell the Truth	Taxim (Germany); Burnside (USA); BGO (UK)
1993	No Compromise	Taxim (Germany); Burnside (USA); BGO (UK)
1995	Roll Again	Taxim (Germany); BGO (UK)
1998	Happy Home	Burnside (USA); Allegro (USA)
2000	New Mountain	Burnside (USA); Allegro (USA)
2003	Live in Luxembourg	Taxim (Germany); BGO (UK)
2008	Solid Ground	Taxim (Germany)
2011	The Rambunctious Blues Experiment	Rockfold (UK)
2013	Ramdango	Rockfold (UK); BGO (UK)
2014	Crazy Blues	Rockfold (UK); BGO (UK)
2015	Shake It Up	Rockfold (UK); BGO (UK)
2016	Ruff'n'Roar – Live at Scratchers	Rockfold (UK
2017	Diggin' Down	Rockfold (UK); BGO (UK)
2018	Bent Frets	Rockfold (UK); BGO (UK)
2019	Steppin' Out	Rockfold (UK); BGO (UK)
2020	Big Wheel	Rockfold (UK)
2020	Crazy with the Blues	Rockfold (UK)
2021	Relentless Boogie	Rockfold (UK)
2023	House of Cards	Rockfold (UK)

With Killing Floor
Year	Title	Label & Country
1969	Killing Floor	Spark (UK); Sire Records (USA)
1970	Out of Uranus	Penny Farthing Repertoire (Germany); Akarma (Italy); Mailbox (Japan)
2004	Zero Tolerance	Appaloosa (Italy)
2012	Rock'n'Roll Gone Mad	Rockfold (UK)

With SALT
Year	Title	Label & Country
2011	The Cobra's Melodies	Rockfold (UK)
