= Sign of the Times (Rubettes album) =

Studio album by The Rubettes
- Released: June 1976
- Genre: Pop rock
- Length: 35:29; 42:02 (with bonus tracks)
- Label: State Records/Polydor Records
- Producer: The Rubettes, Alan Blakley

The Rubettes chronology
Rubettes (1975)	Sign of the Times (1976)	Baby I Know (1977)

Sign of the Times is the fourth studio album by the English band The Rubettes. It was released on the State Records label in June 1976. The album represented a significant change in direction for the band, as it was the first not produced by Wayne Bickerton and Tony Waddington – instead the Rubettes took on production responsibilities themselves, with Alan Blakley (formerly of the Tremeloes) as co-producer. The band made the decision due to the disappointing sales of their previous two Bickerton/Waddington singles and the desire to forge new musical directions.

The Rubettes were a four-piece band by the time Sign of the Times was recorded, as keyboardist Bill Hurd departed earlier in 1976. Tony Thorpe took over keyboard duties in the studio.

The album contained two singles, both released in advance – the only UK single release "You're The Reason Why" and the non-UK A-side "Julia".

In 1992, Dice Records (France) released the Rubettes' third and fourth albums (Rubettes and Sign of the Times) as a double CD set. In 2012, Cherry Red Records issued the album on CD. In 2015, Caroline Records released the album Sign of the Times, with two bonus tracks, as part of a box CD set of the Rubettes' first five studio albums.

== Track listing ==
Side 1

1. "Sign Of The Times" (Mick Clarke, John Richardson, Alan Williams) – 3:39
2. "Dancing In The Rain" (Mike Gower) – 2:56
3. "You're The Only Girl On My Island" (John Richardson, Alan Williams) – 4:23
4. "The Way You Live" (John Richardson, Alan Williams) – 3:07
5. "Not Now My Dear" (John Richardson, Alan Williams) – 3:42

Side 2

1. "You're The Reason Why" (John Richardson, Alan Williams) – 2:34
2. "I Think I'm In Love" (Mick Clarke, John Richardson, Alan Williams) – 3:06
3. "I Really Got To Know" (John Richardson, Alan Williams) – 2:53
4. "Julia" (John Richardson, Alan Williams) – 2:53
5. "Highwayman's Lament" (John Richardson, Alan Williams) – 6:16

=== 2015 CD bonus tracks ===
Alan and John*:

11. "Take Good Care of My Baby" (Gerry Goffin, Carole King) – 3:23
12. "The Price Of Living" (John Richardson, Alan Williams) – 3:10
*Produced by Alan Blakley

NB: All track times taken from 2015 CD

== Singles ==
1. "You're The Reason Why" b/w "Julia" – May 1976 – UK No. 28
2. "Julia" was also released as a non-UK single, b/w either "Dancing In The Rain" or "You're The Reason Why" – in March 1976 (France/Belgium) and May 1976 (several other non-UK markets)

=== Bonus tracks single ===
Bonus tracks 11 & 12 were also released together on the following single:
* "Take Good Care Of My Baby" b/w "The Price Of Living" (as Alan and John) – January 1976 (German release)

== Personnel ==
- Mick Clarke – Bass guitar and vocals
- John Richardson – Drums, percussion and vocals
- Tony Thorpe – Guitar, vocals and keyboards
- Alan Williams – Guitar and vocals

== Publishers (including bonus tracks) ==
- All tracks Warner Bros Music/Arlovol Music/Penny Farthing Music except:

Track 2 – Halcyon Music
Tracks 3 & 6 – Arlovol Music/Penny Farthing Music/Bucks Music
Track 11 – Screen Gems-EMI Music
Track 12 – Halcyon/Belwin Music

== Production and credits ==
- Produced by The Rubettes with Alan Blakley
- Recorded at – DJM Studios
- Mastered at – Turan Audio
- Mastered By – Tim Turan
- Engineer – Mark Wallis
- Tape Op & Beverage – John Cooper
- Catering – Sarge
- Sleeve Concept – The Rubettes
- Designed By – TARGA
- Illustrations & Typo – Martin Rowley
- Design (CD Reissue – Skyrocket) – Tim Smith
- Liner Notes (CD Reissue) – Phil Hendriks
