= Delegation (band) =

British band

- Origin: Birmingham, United Kingdom
- Genres: Funk, soul, R&B, disco
- Years active: 1976–present
- Labels: State Records, Epic
- Members: Rick Bailey
- Past members: Len Coley; Roddy Harris; Ray Patterson; Bruce Dunbar; Kathy Bryant
- Website: https://delegationband.com

Delegation are a British musical group formed in 1976 by Len Coley, Rick Bailey on lead vocals and Roddy Harris. The trio was soon discovered by music producer/songwriter, Ken Gold, who also wrote and produced the hits "You to Me Are Everything", and "Can't Get By Without You" for the Real Thing. Ken and his writing partner, Micky Denne, also wrote songs for Aretha Franklin, Jackie Wilson, and Cliff Richard.

== History ==
The soul-funk band Delegation is from Birmingham, England. Formed in the mid-1970s, the group has been a prominent British act with a strong following across Europe. In 1976, Delegation released their first single, "The Promise of Love", taken from their debut album of the same name, and released on the State Records label, although it wasn’t successful. Their second single, "Where Is the Love (We Used to Know)" also from the same album, reached the UK singles chart in April 1977, gave the group their first hit and consequently, their first Top of the Pops appearance.

Ray Patterson replaced Roddy Harris later that year and the group released their third single, "You've Been Doing Me Wrong", which became their second hit from The Promise of Love. "Oh Honey", a smooth ballad, gave the group their first US hit in 1979. This song reached #5 in the US Billboard R&B charts.

Coley later left the band and Bruce Dunbar took his place. Their second album Eau de Vie was released in 1979. This album turned out to be very successful, including the hits "You and I", "Put a Little Love on Me", "Heartache #9" and "Darling (I Think About You)". Dunbar left the group in 1981 and returned to the US after their third album entitled Delegation and the group continued on with lesser success. In the U.S., Eau de Vie was released as Delegation in 1980, while their actual album Delegation from 1981 was released as Delegation II, both with alternate covers.

The group followed with Deuces High in 1982. All charted in Europe but not in the United States. The act recorded a couple more singles and continued to perform through the end of the decade. The record "It's Your Turn", released on Epic was successful only in France, although did well on the club scene across the United Kingdom, with an ultimate change of members, through the addition of Texas born vocalist Kathy Bryant, thus becoming the first female member of the group. Two years later, in 1985, they released "Thanks to You". The Mix on Scorpio Records, a segue compilation of five of their greatest hits, also sold poorly.

Bailey reunited with Gold to form Euro Jam Records in the mid-1990s, repackaging Delegation's earlier recordings into new compilation albums and reforming the group to release Encore in Europe in 1999 but this was Delegation's final recording.

== Discography ==
=== Albums ===
Year	Title	Peak chart positions	
Year	Title	US	US R&B
1977	The Promise of Love	84	8
1979	Eau de Vie	—	—
1980	Delegation (american release of Eau de Vie)	—	69
1981	Delegation II	—	—
1982	Deuces High	—	—
1993	Encore	—	—
"—" denotes releases that did not chart.

=== Singles ===
Year	Title	Peak chart positions				
Year	Title	US Dance	US R&B	US Pop	UK	CAN
1977	"Where Is the Love (We Used to Know)"	—	—	―	22	―
1977	"You've Been Doing Me Wrong"	—	—	―	49	―
1978	"Honey, I'm Rich"	—	―	—	―	―
1978	"Oh Honey"	―	6	45	―	99
1979	"Put a Little Love on Me"	—	—	―	―	—
1979	"Someone Oughta Write a Song (About You Baby)"	—	45	—	―	—
1979	"You and I"	—	—	―	―	—
1980	"Welcome to My World"	―	50	—	―	―
1980	"Heartache No.9"	57	66	—	―	―
1981	"Twelfth House"	―	—	―	―	―
1981	"In Love's Time"	―	54	―	—	―
1983	"It's Your Turn"	―	―	―	94	―
"—" denotes releases that did not chart or were not released in that territory.

== See also ==
- List of performances on Top of the Pops
