= Daniel Boone (singer) =

English pop musician (1942–2023)

- Also known as: Peter Lee Stirling; Lee Stirling; Peter Lee
- Born: Peter Charles Green; 31 July 1942
- Origin: Birmingham, England
- Died: 27 January 2023 (aged 80) Paignton, Devon, England
- Genre: Pop
- Occupations: Singer, songwriter, session musician
- Instruments: Vocals, piano, guitar
- Years active: 1958–2023
- Labels: Penny Farthing, Parlophone, Columbia, Decca, MCA

Daniel Boone (born Peter Charles Green; 31 July 1942 – 27 January 2023) was an English pop musician who became a one-hit wonder in the United States with the single "Beautiful Sunday" in 1972. The song was written by Boone and Rod McQueen and sold over 2,000,000 copies worldwide. It peaked at number 15 on The Billboard Hot 100 singles chart at the end of the summer of 1972, having already reached number 21 on the UK Singles Chart earlier during that same year. In 1972, Boone was the recipient of the "Most Likeable Singer" award from Rolling Stone magazine.

== Early career as Peter Lee Stirling and/or The Bruisers ==
Peter Green (later to become Peter Lee Stirling) started his career as the guitarist and vocalist with a band called the Beachcombers that played gigs in the Birmingham area during the period from 1958 to 1962. Their fortunes changed when they encountered Tommy Bruce, who had a number 3 hit in 1960 with "Ain't Misbehavin'". This, and some subsequent releases, had been attributed to 'Tommy Bruce and the Bruisers', despite the fact that the instrumental backings were provided by session musicians at EMI. Bruce's account of the meeting was as follows:

"I met them up in Birmingham. They were working at the Plaza club. I was gigging there. They were great. Vocal, backing, the lot. Especially Pete (Peter Green) on lead guitar. He was magnificent. I said ‘how would you like to become The Bruisers?’ They jumped in and loved it. Peter “Mac” McGinty was on bass (born Peter Julian McGinty, 16 August 1941, Birmingham, Warwickshire), Donald McGinty was on drums (born 23 June 1946, Birmingham, Warwickshire), Bobby Coral, (born John Ship, 1 September 1940, Birmingham, Warwickshire), was on backing vocals with Pete Green".

The Bruisers started their recording career at EMI with Bruce and his manager Barry Mason, who later became a famous songwriter. Peter Green released a solo recording of a song called "My Heart Commands Me" under the name 'Lee Stirling' in March 1963. Mason and (the now renamed) Stirling then collaborated on what was for both of them their first songwriting effort. Mason recalls this as follows:

"The first person I wrote with was Peter Lee Stirling, who later became Daniel Boone and was originally Peter Green. He was with a group called The Beachcombers, who became The Bruisers, who backed Tommy Bruce! And my first chart thing ever was a thing called "Blue Girl" for The Bruisers, which I wrote with Peter".

"Blue Girl" was released on 11 July 1963, and entered the UK charts on 8 August, eventually reaching number 31. On the strength of this hit, the band appeared on the Thank Your Lucky Stars television show on 26 October, performing the follow-up "I Could If I Wanted To". This was probably the only TV appearance of the Bruisers as a group, although Peter Lee Stirling appeared solo on later editions of the programme, and also on Ready Steady Go!. "I Could if I Wanted To" and the subsequent releases, "Your Turn To Cry" and "I Believe", were unsuccessful. The first use of the full name 'Peter Lee Stirling' was in 1964 on "Sad, Lonely and Blue", but none of the eight records issued between 1964 and 1970 under this name entered the UK chart. However, Stirling went on to write or co-write "I Think of You" and "Don't Turn Around", both of which were hits for The Merseybeats, and co-wrote "I Belong" for Kathy Kirby, which came second in the Eurovision Song Contest in 1965.

The Bruisers broke up in 1967 and Stirling became the co-owner, with Bernard Mattimore, of a recording studio in London's Whitechapel Road, which specialised in covering contemporary chart material. He subsequently joined the studio band 'Hungry Wolf' for one album, and when they became 'Rumpelstiltskin' he worked with them for a further two albums. He also wrote musical scores for the films Groupie Girl and Goodbye Gemini.

== Career as Daniel Boone ==
In 1971, Peter Green joined Larry Page's Penny Farthing record label (Penny Farthing Records) as a singer/songwriter and changed his stage name from Peter Lee Stirling to Daniel Boone, after the American folk-hero. His first release for the label was a ballad called "Daddy Don't You Walk So Fast", written by Geoff Stephens and Peter Callander and it rewarded him with his first, and only, top-twenty hit in the UK, peaking at number 17. Boone then collaborated with Rod McQueen, another songwriter working for Penny Farthing, to produce the follow up. The result was "Mamma", which failed to make any impact on the charts.

What happened next is explained by Terry Noon who, at that time, was the managing director of the Penny Farthing Publishing Company:

"The two writers, Daniel Boone and Rod McQueen, had been signed to us for some time, and one morning they came into my office saying, "We've written this great song". And I said, "Sure, fine sit down and have a cup of tea". And they said, "No, really, we've got to play you this song". So I buzzed Larry Page and he said, "I'm coming up". Now we used to have a little room with a piano in it, and it really was little. The four of us went into this room and it was crowded. And Daniel Boone sat down at the piano and started thumping out this tune and they both sang, although some of the lyrics weren't finished, and Larry was just standing there and when it was finished he said, "That's a hit, I'm going to record that next week". And he turned to me, and I said, "Yeah, I think it's a smash". And I really did. It was the excitement of the whole thing. We were in a tiny confined space; Daniel was really banging away at the piano. They were singing out really loud. You could tell it, you could feel it, the little hairs on the back of your neck were standing out. And there was the speed of the whole thing. We'd heard it one week and it was recorded the following week. Then Larry decided to rush it out".

The record was "Beautiful Sunday". It was released in March 1972 and rose to number 21 in the UK Singles Chart. It fared rather better in the US peaking at number 15 on the Billboard Hot 100. It also made the charts in Australia and New Zealand (gold record), Argentina, Belgium, France, Italy, Mexico, South Africa, Scandinavia, the Netherlands and Germany. Boone became particularly popular in Germany, and released versions of "Beautiful Sunday" and the follow up, "Annabelle", in German. "Beautiful Sunday" held the number one position in Germany from May to late June 1972.

"Beautiful Sunday" remains the biggest selling single by an international artist on the Japanese Oricon chart (coming in 19th on the all-time singles sales list with almost two million copies sold). The song was recorded in Brazilian Portuguese by the Brazilian singer Angelo Maximo, under the title: Domingo Feliz (Happy Sunday), and also was recorded by the Brazilian pop band Renato e seus Blue Caps, Angelo Maximo became a smash hit, but Renato E seus Blue Caps did not chart, also Daniel Boone never was released in Brazil. The song was translated into Russian and covered by the Russian pop group Чиж и Ко, becoming a hit on the Russian Music Charts in 1996.

It has also become a popular song among fans of Scottish football club Dundee United. Boone was known to be a lifelong Dundee United fan, and tried to invest in the club on several occasions. Boone and McQueen also wrote "Blue Is The Colour", the football anthem for Chelsea.

Boone continued his career as a composer. He contributed to studio projects including The Warlord (notably “The Ultimate Warlord”, 1978) and The Intergalactic Orchestra (album Super Nova, 1979), where he worked with David Byron (as Mark Oxford) and the Birmingham Midland Orchestra. In 1992, he collaborated with Larry Page to provide The Troggs with two songs for their Athens Andover album ("Tuned into Love" and "Hot Stuff").

== Death ==
Boone died in Paignton, Devon on 27 January 2023, at the age of 80.
