= Beautiful Sunday (song) =

1972 single by Daniel Boone

Single by Daniel Boone

from the album Beautiful Sunday
- B-side: "Truly Julie"
- Released: 25 February 1972
- Genre: Bubblegum pop; folk; soft rock
- Length: 3:08
- Label: Penny Farthing
- Songwriters: Daniel Boone, Rod McQueen
- Producer: Larry Page

Daniel Boone singles chronology
"Daddy Don't You Walk So Fast" (1971)	"Beautiful Sunday" (1972)	"Annabelle" (1972)

"Beautiful Sunday" is a song written by Daniel Boone (real name Peter Charles Green) and Rod McQueen (real name David Balfe) and performed by Boone. It appeared on his 1972 album Beautiful Sunday and was produced by Larry Page and arranged by Boone.

It has been described as the biggest international hit in the British bubblegum pop genre. Robin Carmody of Freaky Trigger praised the song for its "timelessly, wonderfully obvious chord sequence" and euphoric tone, "without any hint that driving to and from your day's pleasure and relaxation might even contain anything sexual, let alone anything depressing, tedious and ugly." He named it the greatest British bubblegum pop song, deeming it "a neo-folk song structure of almost religious, redemptive simplicity / sublimity. One of the greatest singles of the 70s, if not ever."

== Chart performance ==
"Beautiful Sunday" was released by Penny Farthing Records, but by Mercury Records in the US, in 1972. It peaked at No. 15 on Billboard Hot 100 on 16–23 September 1972 and at No. 1 on WCFL on 21 October 1972. The song also made the charts in New Zealand (gold record), France, Japan, South Africa, Mexico, and Germany, where it held the No. 1 position from May 1972 to late June 1972.

The song peaked at No. 21 in the United Kingdom on its original release in 1972, and reached No. 53 when re-released in 1974.

Boone re-released the song in Japan in 1976; it topped the Oricon Singles Chart from 22 March to 28 June. "Beautiful Sunday" remains one of the best selling singles by foreign artists in Japan.

=== Weekly charts ===
Chart (1972)	Peak position
Australia (ARIA)	8
Australia (Go-Set National Top 40)	6
Belgium (Flanders)	4
Canada (RPM 100)	4
Germany	1
Ireland (IRMA)	18
Mexico	1
Netherlands	14
New Zealand (Listener)	1
Norway (VG-lista)	1
South Africa (Springbok)	1
Switzerland	2
UK Singles (Official Charts Company)	21
US Easy Listening	6
US Billboard Hot 100	15
US Cash Box Top 100	16

Chart (1974)	Peak position
UK Singles	53

Chart (1976)	Peak position
Japan	1

=== Sales ===
Region	Certification	Certified units/sales
Japan sales up to 1977	—	2,050,000

=== Year-end charts ===
Chart (1972)	Rank
Australia	50
Canada	30
U.S. Billboard Hot 100	42
U.S. Cash Box	77

== In popular culture ==
The song is commonly used for the 'Slosh' dance. The dance is popular in Scotland where it is commonly played at wedding receptions. The song has also been sung by supporters of Dundee United since around the 1990s.

== In media ==
"Beautiful Sunday" was the theme song in 1975-76 on Japan's TBS morning show, Ohayo 720.

The song was featured in the Scottish sitcom Still Game's second series episode "Doactors" (Doctors). Characters Jack Jarvis and Victor McDade dance the Slosh to it.

The 2010 musical I Dreamed a Dream, based on the life of singer Susan Boyle, includes the tune.

The song appears in the HBO Max series The Righteous Gemstones, in the second season's ninth episode, "I Will Tell of All Your Deeds".

== Other versions ==
- Jack Reno, as a single in 1973. It went to No. 67 on the U.S. country chart.
- Kikki Danielsson and Roosarna on the 1996 album Hem till Norden.
- NRBQ, on the 2002 album Atsa My Band.
- The Ventures released an instrumental rendition.
- Seiji Tanaka released a Japanese version of "Beautiful Sunday" as a single in 1976. It reached #4 on the Japan singles chart and has sold half a million copies.
- "Poyushchiye Gitary" ("The Singing guitars") - a Soviet group, recorded it in 1975. (Russian text by M.Belyakov).
- Brazilian musician Rossini Pinto wrote a Portuguese-language version of the song, entitled "Domingo Feliz" ("Happy Sunday"), in 1972, which has been since covered by many bands and artists such as Renato e Seus Blue Caps, Ângelo Máximo and Maurício Pereira.
- Pou Vannary - A Cambodian Singer in the early to mid 1970s, sang the song with both English and Khmer lyrics.
- The Squirrels Group recorded a version on their 1990 release "What Gives?".

== See also ==
- List of number-one hits of 1972 (Mexico)
