= Sugar Baby Love =

1974 single by The Rubettes

Single by The Rubettes

from the album Wear It's 'At
- B-side: "You Could Have Told Me"
- Released: January 1974
- Recorded: Late 1973
- Genre: Bubblegum pop; glam rock; rock and roll
- Length: 3:31
- Label: Polydor
- Songwriters: Wayne Bickerton; Tony Waddington
- Producer: Wayne Bickerton

The Rubettes singles chronology
"Sugar Baby Love" (1974)	"Tonight" (1974)

"Sugar Baby Love" is a bubblegum pop song by English musical group the Rubettes, released as their debut single. Written by Wayne Bickerton and Tony Waddington and produced by Bickerton, the song was recorded in late 1973 and released in January 1974. "Sugar Baby Love" was the band's only number one single on the UK Singles Chart, spending four weeks at the top of the chart in May 1974.

== Recording details ==
Bickerton and Waddington had been writing songs together since they were both members of the Pete Best Four in Liverpool in the early 1960s. Their biggest success had been writing "Nothing but a Heartache", a US hit for the Flirtations in 1968.

In the early 1970s, they came up with the idea for a rock 'n' roll musical. They co-wrote and produced a demonstration recording of "Sugar Baby Love", recorded October 1973 with "Tonight", "Juke Box Jive" and "Sugar Candy Kisses" (which became a hit for Mac and Katie Kissoon). They originally intended to submit it for the Eurovision Song Contest but instead offered it to Showaddywaddy and Carl Wayne, who both turned it down.

They then offered it to the demo musicians, provided that they would become an actual group, with the exception of the recording's lead singer, Paul Da Vinci, who had signed a solo recording contract with Penny Farthing Records. Surprisingly, only John Richardson, who played drums and spoke the "please take my advice", Alan Williams, who sang in the chorus backing vocal group, and Pete Arnesen, who played piano, would sign up and later become a member of The Rubettes. For public appearances including Top of the Pops, Williams, who claimed to be the only member of the group able to duplicate Da Vinci's falsetto, performed the lead vocals.

Bickerton said:

"We had Paul DaVinci singing in that incredibly high falsetto voice and then a vocal group sings 'Bop-shu-waddy' over and over for about 3 minutes. Gerry Shury, who did the string arrangements, said, 'This is not going to work: you can't have a vocal group singing 'Bop-shu-waddy' non-stop.' A lot of people said the same thing to us and the more determined I became to release it. The record was dormant for 6 or 7 weeks and then we got a break on Top of the Pops and it took off like a rocket and sold 6 million copies worldwide. Gerry said to me, 'I'm keeping my mouth shut and will concentrate on conducting the strings.'"

"Sugar Baby Love" became a UK No. 1 hit in 1974, also reaching No. 37 and No. 30 on the US Billboard Hot 100 and Cashbox charts, respectively. It also reached No. 1 in Germany, Switzerland, Sweden, the Netherlands, Austria and Belgium, and No. 2 in Australia, South Africa and Italy.

== Charts ==
=== Weekly charts ===
Chart (1974)	Peak position
Argentina	6
Australia (Kent Music Report)	2
Austria (Ö3 Austria Top 40)	1
Belgium (Ultratop 50 Flanders)	1
Belgium (Ultratop 50 Wallonia)	1
Canada (RPM)	25
Netherlands (Dutch Top 40)	1
New Zealand (Listener)	4
Norway (VG-lista)	2
Switzerland (Schweizer Hitparade)	1
UK Singles Chart (OCC)	1
West Germany (GfK)	1

=== Year-end charts ===
Chart (1974)	Position
Australia (Kent Music Report)	21

== Wink version ==
"Sugar Baby Love"

Single by Wink

from the album Moonlight Serenade
- Language: Japanese
- B-side: "Kaze no Prelude"
- Released: April 27, 1988
- Recorded: 1988
- Genre: J-pop; dance-pop
- Length: 3:51
- Label: Polystar
- Composers: Wayne Bickerton; Tony Waddington
- Lyricist: Joe Lemon
- Producer: Haruo Mizuhashi

Wink singles chronology
"Sugar Baby Love" (1988)	"Amaryllis" (1988)

Music video
- "Sugar Baby Love" on YouTube

"Sugar Baby Love" was covered by Japanese idol duo Wink as their debut single, released on 27 April 1988 by Polystar. The Japanese lyrics were written by Yukinojo Mori, under the pseudonym "Joe Lemon". "Sugar Baby Love" was used as the theme song of the Fuji TV drama series Netsuppoi no! (熱っぽいの!; It's Hot!), which starred Yoko Minamino. The B-side, "Kaze no Prelude", was used as an image song in the drama series.

The single peaked at No. 20 on Oricon's singles chart and sold over 61,000 copies.

=== Track listing ===
All lyrics are written by Joe Lemon; all music is arranged by Shirō Sagisu.

No.	Title	Music	Length
1.	"Sugar Baby Love"	Wayne Bickerton; Tony Waddington	3:51
2.	"Kaze no Prelude" (Kaze no Pureryūdo (風の前奏曲（プレリュード）; "Wind Prelude"))	Akira Mitake	4:44

=== Charts ===
Chart (1988)	Peak position
Japanese Oricon Singles Chart	20

== Other cover versions and appearances ==
- Sugar Baby Love was covered by the Norwegian Jahn Teigen, and appeared amongst others on the album series called Treff-serien (The Meeting Series) in 1974.
- The song was covered in Czech by Josef Laufer titled "Šumař Pépi" in 1974.
- The song was covered in Czech by Karel Gott titled "Nic než láska tvá (Nothing but Your Love)" in 1974.
- The song was covered in Slovak by Jezinky and Karol Konárik titled "V srdci lásku mám (Love In My Heart)" in 1975.
- The song was covered in French by Dutch singer Dave, with the title "Trop beau", in 1974.
- The song was first covered in European Spanish by J. Santana (previously known as Abel), titled as "Dulce Niña, Amor", in 1974 on his two-song vinyl single Carolina / Dulce Niña, Amor. Likewise, it was also covered in European Spanish by Dave, this time with the title "Sugar Baby Love", in 1975 on his two-song single Dave canta en español: Sugar Baby Love / La Misma Canción.
- The song was covered in American Spanish by the Mexican band Grupo Salvaje, titled as "Azucarado", in 1976 on their LP album Salvaje.
- The song was covered in German by Mon Thys in 1974.
- The song was covered in Japanese by Candies on their 1974 album Namida no Kisetsu.
- The song was covered by Bulgarian vocal quartet Tonica in 1975. The cover, titled "Svetlina (Light)", was the B-side to Tonica's first single.
- The song was used in the beginning of the 1994 Australian movie, Muriel's Wedding.
- The song was covered in Portuguese by Sandy & Junior in 1995, titled as "Doce como mel". It was the 13th track on the album Você é D+.
- The Wink version was covered by Yoko Ishida in 2001 as the opening theme of the anime series A Little Snow Fairy Sugar. Ishida also covered the English version as a bonus track on the U.S. release of her album Sweets.
- The song was covered in Cantonese by Gigi Leung, on the Cantonese version of the Japanese anime series A Little Snow Fairy Sugar, in 2003.
- The song was used in the beginning of the 2005 Irish film, Breakfast on Pluto.
- The song was used as the opening theme for the Greek satirical TV show, Radio Arvyla since 2008.
- The song's hook was used in The Auteurs' 1999 song sharing the band's name "The Rubettes".
