= Blue Is the Colour (song) =

Single by The Chelsea Football Team
- B-side: "All Sing Together"
- Released: 18 February 1972
- Genre: Pop
- Length: 2:21
- Label: Penny Farthing Records
- Songwriters: Daniel Boone, Rod McQueen
- Producer: Larry Page

"Blue Is the Colour" is a terrace chant associated with Chelsea Football Club. It was performed by players from the Chelsea squad and released in 1972 to coincide with the club's ultimately unsuccessful appearance in that year's League Cup Final against Stoke City. The record was issued by Penny Farthing Records and reached number 5 in the UK Charts and number 8 in Ireland in March 1972. It has become one of the most well-known English football songs.

The song continues to be popular among Chelsea's supporters decades after its release, and it remains the club's signature anthem, played at every home game and any cup finals Chelsea compete in. The song has also been adapted by many other teams in various sports around the world.

== Background ==
The song was produced by Larry Page, who commissioned Daniel Boone and lyricist David Balfe (under the pseudonym Rod McQueen) to write the song for Chelsea F.C.

The song was sung by members of the squad, who included:

- Tommy Baldwin
- Stewart Houston
- Charlie Cooke
- John Dempsey
- Ron Harris
- Marvin Hinton
- John Hollins
- Peter Houseman
- Alan Hudson
- Steve Kember
- Eddie McCreadie
- Paddy Mulligan
- Peter Osgood
- David Webb
- Chris Garland

The song was released on Page's Penny Farthing label. The original version sold a quarter of a million copies, and sales of various versions of the song reached a million copies worldwide.

== Charts ==
| Chart (1972) | Peak position |
|---|---|
| Ireland (IRMA) | 8 |
| UK Singles (Official Charts) | 5 |

== Other versions ==
The song became popular in many countries in 1972 with many local versions of the song released. Dutch team Ajax released a version titled "Ajax, Leve Ajax!" by Vader Abraham with Zijn Goede Zonen, the French singer Antoine released a version with the Marseille team, and a Swedish version was also recorded. The Ajax version reached No. 25 on the Dutch Top 40 in the Netherlands.

In 1972, the song was also performed by the Australian cricket team visiting England as part of the Ashes tour. It was sung by players and recorded as "Here Come the Aussies". It was also released on record and became a hit in Australia.

The song has been modified into Danish by Flemming Antony into the title "Rød-hvide farver" (Red and white colours). The song was the official supporter's song for the Denmark national team, when they participated at the 1972 Summer Olympics. Another version was released in 1984.

The song was covered by Czech singer František Ringo Čech under the title "Zelená je tráva" (Green Is the Grass), and has become a popular football anthem in former Czechoslovakia.

The song is translated to Finnish by Vexi Salmi and used prior to kick-off in all the home fixtures of Helsinki-based Helsingin Jalkapalloklubi. It was recorded 1973 by the first squad of the team. The title in Finnish is "HOO-JII-KOO", but is better known as "Taas kansa täyttää", as the first verse begins with these words. Direct translation to English would be 'Again Terraces Are Filled'.

In 1975, Erik Beck adapted the song as "Green Is the Color" to honour the opening season of the Portland Timbers in the North American Soccer League. Beck and his friends Ron Brady and Peter Yeates later recorded the song, which was released as a single in 1976 and went on to sell 8,000 copies and receive airplay on Portland radio stations throughout the 1970s and 1980s. The song served as the Timbers fight song until 1982, and returned when the team was re-formed as part of the United Soccer League in 2001. In the early 2010s, the song was played at halftime during Timbers home matches and in 2015 the team, now playing in Major League Soccer, released a "Green Is the Color" scarf to commemorate the 40th anniversary of the club.

In 1978, the song was re-recorded as "White Is the Colour" for the Vancouver Whitecaps and became a local hit. The Scottish rock duo the Proclaimers re-recorded "White Is the Colour" for the Whitecaps' 2002 season, and performed it live during half-time of a game. Since the club's move to Major League Soccer in 2011, it has been the entrance song for every home game at BC Place.

An adapted version called "Green Is the Colour" with lyrics by Steve Mazurak is the official fight song of the Saskatchewan Roughriders of the Canadian Football League since 1981.

Supporters of the J. League Division 1 side Montedio Yamagata are known to use a variant of the song.

Supporters of the Norwegian team Molde FK also use a variant of a song, where the title ("Blått er vår farge") directly translates to "Blue is our colour". The rest of the refrain is altered, however.

The song was used as the basis for a campaign record used by the successful Conservative campaign in the 1979 general election. The song used was a parody of the Chelsea version, with the words changed to:

"Blue is the colour;"
"Maggie is her name;"
"we're all together" (...verse....)
chorus....
"Margaret Thatcher is her name!"

Peel Thunder, an Australian rules football club in the WAFL since 1997, bases its club song on this tune.
