= I Can Do It =

Single by The Rubettes

from the album We Can Do It
- B-side: "If You've Got the Time"
- Released: March 1975
- Genre: Glam rock
- Label: State Records/Polydor Records
- Songwriter(s): Wayne Bickerton, Tony Waddington
- Producer(s): Wayne Bickerton, Tony Waddington

The Rubettes singles chronology
| "Juke Box Jive" (1975) | "I Can Do It" (1975) | "Foe-Dee-O-Dee" (1975) |

"I Can Do It" was the fourth single released by the English band The Rubettes and the second single from their album We can do it. The song was written and produced by Wayne Bickerton and Tony Waddington. It reached number 7 in the UK charts, making it the band's third top 10 UK hit from four single releases.
The single was significant in that it was the first release on the State Records, a label set up by Bickerton, Waddington and John Fruin in 1975, bearing the catalogue number STAT 1.

== Charts ==
=== Weekly charts ===
| Chart (1975) | Peak position |
|---|---|
| Australia (Kent Music Report) | 89 |
| Austria (Ö3 Austria Top 40) | 7 |
| Belgium (Ultratop 50 Flanders) | 5 |
| Belgium (Ultratop 50 Wallonia) | 5 |
| France (SNEP) | 2 |
| Netherlands (Dutch Top 40) | 5 |
| Netherlands (Single Top 100) | 5 |
| Switzerland (Schweizer Hitparade) | 6 |
| UK Singles (OCC) | 7 |
| West Germany (GfK) | 3 |

=== Year-end charts ===
| Chart (1975) | Position |
|---|---|
| Belgium (Ultratop Flanders) | 31 |
| Netherlands (Dutch Top 40) | 82 |
| Netherlands (Single Top 100) | 68 |
| West Germany (Official German Charts) | 20 |

== Later uses ==
- Cover versions project Top of the Pops featured a version of I Can Do It on Top of the Pops, Volume 44 released in March 1975.
- In 1977, the Liverpool Football club released We Can Do It as a single, to the tune of I Can Do It.
- Netherlands Glam Rock band Block Busters included a cover version of the song on their album Powder to the People in 1999.
- Finnish band Kim and the Hurmio included a version of I Can Do It on their 2003 album "Put The Blame on Me".
- Showaddywaddy included a version of I Can Do It on their 2006 album I Love Rock'n'Roll.
