= Killing Floor (British band) =

British blues rock band

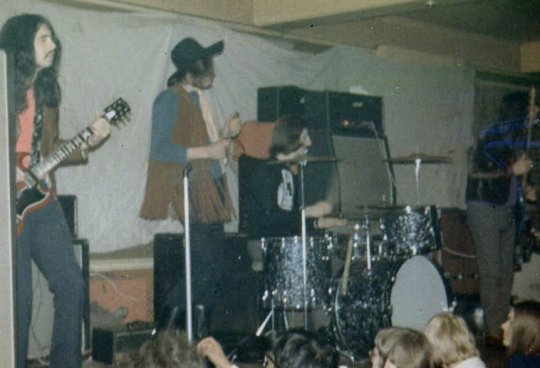
- Killing Floor performing at the Dagenham Roundhouse in 1971

Background information
- Origin: London, England
- Genres: Blues rock, garage rock, pop rock
- Years active: 1968–1972; 2002–present
- Labels: Spark Records, Penny Farthing Records, Appaloosa Records, Rockfold Records
- Members: Mick Clarke; Bill Thorndycraft; Stuart McDonald; Bazz Smith
- Past members: Lou Martin; Rod de'Ath; Ray Owen; Mick Hawksworth

Killing Floor are a British blues rock band, who formed in 1968. They released two albums and four singles before initially disbanding in 1972. They have issued another two albums since their reformation in 2002. The band name came from the title of Howlin' Wolf's 1964 track, "Killing Floor".

== Career ==
Originally performing in a blues band known as The Loop, Killing Floor founder members Mick Clarke (lead guitar) and Bill Thorndycraft (vocals/harmonica) formed the band in 1968 in London, England, after placing an advertisement in Melody Maker. From this, they recruited Lou Martin (piano), Stuart McDonald (bass guitar) and Bazz Smith (drums). After undertaking their maiden gig, former Wonderful Radio London DJ and agent, John Edward, offered to manage the fledgling outfit. Edward led them to signing a recording contract with Spark Records and, in 1969, their self-titled debut album was recorded in less than two weeks at the Pye Recording Studios. Edwards was listed as the record's producer, although he had no previous experience in that field. The majority of the tracks were re-workings of older Chicago blues material, although the only true cover version therein was of Willie Dixon's "You Need Love". AllMusic described the set as a " less reverent, and altogether heavier update of The Yardbirds rave-up sound". In the United States, the album was released on the Sire label.

The band were again indebted to Edward, who arranged for them to appear at the California Ballroom in Dunstable, where they supported Ten Years After, Jethro Tull, Chicken Shack, and The Herd. They also played at the Marquee Club in London, supporting Yes and The Nice. In 1969, the band expanded their loyal fan base when undertaking two UK nationwide concert tours with the American bluesman, Freddie King. The band also took the opportunity to back Arthur "Big Boy" Crudup. Following the release of Killing Floor and a couple of BBC Radio 1 sessions, Lou Martin left the band, and they continued for a while as a four piece. In March 1970, the band played at the Easter Festival in Hamburg, Germany. In 1970 and 1971, further line-up changes took place which included the former Juicy Lucy vocalist Ray Owen, drummer Rod de'Ath, and bassist Mick Hawksworth, joining the band. The latter had previously been with Andromeda, and later went on to join Fuzzy Duck.

In 1970, the band's second album, Out of Uranus was released on Penny Farthing Records. Although Edward retained record producer duties, Larry Page oversaw the recording sessions as executive producer. AllMusic commented that "Out of Uranus is rawer and more irreverent than most second-line British blues-rock of the late '60s and early '70s, as indicated by the title itself". A single from Out of Uranus, "Call For the Politicians", received airplay on BBC Radio 1, and also sold well in Germany.

However, by mid-1972, the group had decided to disband. Thorndycraft left the music industry, whilst Smith moved on to play in other bands. McDonald joined the former Free singer, Paul Rodgers, in a short-lived outfit called Peace, before McDonald moved back to his native Wales and played in locally based bands. By this time Lou Martin had already joined Rory Gallagher's band, where he was joined by de'Ath. Mick Clarke formed SALT, a pub rock outfit, before instigating the Mick Clarke Band. Clarke subsequently issued nineteen solo albums and continues to tour with his band. Repertoire Records and See for Miles Records reissued both of the Killing Floor albums.

In 2002, the original 1968 line-up reconvened and, after a gap of almost 35 years, issued another Killing Floor album, Zero Tolerance (2004), on Appaloosa Records. The band undertook concert dates across Europe, and in May 2012 their fourth album, Rock 'n' Roll Gone Mad, was released. It was dedicated to the late Hubert Sumlin, who had been the lead guitarist on Howlin' Wolf's recording of the song "Killing Floor".

The band performed at the Sweden Rock Festival in June 2012, on the same bill as Motörhead and Blue Öyster Cult.

Lou Martin died in Bournemouth, Dorset, on 17 August 2012, aged 63. Rod de'Ath, aged 64 died on 1 August 2014.

== Discography ==
=== Albums ===
Year	Title	Label
1969	Killing Floor	Spark Records
1970	Out of Uranus	Penny Farthing Records
2004	Zero Tolerance	Appaloosa Records
2012	Rock 'n' Roll Gone Mad	Rockfold Records

=== Singles ===
Year	Title	Label	Album
1969	"Wow Wow Wow"	Spark Records	Non-album single
1970	"Call For the Politicians"	Penny Farthing Records	Out of Uranus
1971	"Milkman" / "Where Nobody Ever Goes"	Penny Farthing Records	Out of Uranus
1972	"Out of Uranus" / "Sun Keeps Shining"	Yanki Plak Records (Turkey only)	Out of Uranus
