= Tonight (Rubettes song) =

Single by The Rubettes

from the album Wear It's 'At
- B-side: "Silent Movie Queen"
- Released: July 1974
- Genre: Glam rock
- Length: 3:42
- Label: Polydor
- Songwriters: Wayne Bickerton, Tony Waddington
- Producer: Wayne Bickerton

The Rubettes singles chronology
"Sugar Baby Love" (1974)	"Tonight" (1974)	"Juke Box Jive" (1975)

"Tonight" was the second single released by The Rubettes from their debut album Wear It's 'At. Written by Wayne Bickerton and Tony Waddington and produced by Bickerton, the single reached number 12 in the UK charts.

"Tonight" was one of the four demonstration recordings recorded by session musicians and singers in October 1973 which led to the formation of the Rubettes—the others being "Sugar Baby Love", "Juke Box Jive" and "Sugar Candy Kisses" (which became a hit for Mac and Katie Kissoon).

== Charts ==
Chart (1974/75)	Peak position
Australia (Kent Music Report)	98
France (SNEP)	2
Germany	4
The Netherlands	4
United Kingdom (Official Charts Company)	12

== Later uses ==
- German singer Henner Hoier released a version of the song as a single in 1974
- French singer Philippe Leroy released a French lyrics version of the song as a single in 1974, entitled "Ce Soir"
- Italian group La quinta faccia released the song as a single in 1975
- Swedish dance band Curt Haagers covered the song on their 1977 album My Symphony
- Belgian band Das Pop released the song as a promo single in 2000 and included it on their album I ♥
