= Steve Bennett (jewelry entrepreneur) =

British gem expert and entrepreneur (born 1966)

- Born: 5 February 1966 (age 60); Birmingham, West Midlands, England
- Occupation: Entrepreneur
- Years active: 1972–present
- Known for: Gemology; gem hunting; health expert
- Spouse: Sarah Davies (m. 2016)
- Children: 7

Steve Bennett (born 5 February 1966) is a British gemstone expert and serial entrepreneur, who has since focused on the health industry. He is known for his online shopping businesses.

== Career ==
As a young man, Bennett worked in a number of office based computer roles. After losing his job, he set up his own UK company selling computers and later software. This small enterprise later became Software Warehouse, and grew to be a 30 store retail chain in the 1990s. Bennett sold the company in 2000.

With the advent of the internet, Bennett established jungle.com which he later sold for £37 million.

Bennet started several more e-commerce, retail and entertainment companies. He set up jewelry retailer Gems TV in 2004 and The Genuine Gemstone Company in 2007. The company employs about 500 staff members. In 2012 Genuine Gemstone was named to the Fast Track 100 list of fastest growing privately held companies.

As of 2014 the company operates several brands, including Gems TV.

== Awards and accolades ==
- 1997- Software Warehouse wins the first ever Fast Track 100.
- 2012- The Genuine Gemstone Company tops Sunday Times Fast Track 100
- 2013- Steve Bennett wins Ernst & Young UK Turnaround Entrepreneur of the Year
- 2013- The Genuine Gemstone Company wins Jewellery Retailer of the Year
