= Juke Box Jive =

Single by The Rubettes

from the album We Can Do It
- B-side: "When You're Falling in Love" (UK); Forever (Outside UK)
- Released: November 1974
- Genre: Glam rock
- Length: 3:00
- Label: Polydor
- Songwriter(s): Wayne Bickerton, Tony Waddington
- Producer(s): Wayne Bickerton

The Rubettes singles chronology
"Tonight" (1974)	"Juke Box Jive" (1974)	"I Can Do It" (1975)

"Juke Box Jive", by English band The Rubettes, was the lead single from their second album We Can Do It. As with their two previous singles, it was written by the songwriting team of Wayne Bickerton and Tony Waddington and produced by Bickerton. The single reached number 3 in the UK charts.

"Juke Box Jive" was one of the four demonstration recordings recorded by session musicians and singers in October 1973 which led to the formation of the Rubettes - the others being "Sugar Baby Love", "Tonight" and "Sugar Candy Kisses" (which became a hit for Mac and Katie Kissoon).

The UK single featured non-album-track "When You're Falling in Love" as the b-side, while other markets featured "Forever" (from the band's debut album Wear It's 'At) as the b-side.

== Charts ==
=== Weekly charts ===
Chart (1974–1975)	Peak position
Australia (Kent Music Report)	46
Austria (Ö3 Austria Top 40)	8
Belgium (Ultratop 50 Flanders)	1
Belgium (Ultratop 50 Wallonia)	1
France (SNEP)	2
Netherlands (Dutch Top 40)	2
Netherlands (Single Top 100)	2
UK Singles (OCC)	3
West Germany (GfK)	4

=== Year-end charts ===
Chart (1975)	Position
Belgium (Ultratop Flanders)	19
Netherlands (Dutch Top 40)	54
Netherlands (Single Top 100)	66
West Germany (Official German Charts)	14

== Later Uses ==
- Cover versions project Top of the Pops featured a version of "Juke Box Jive" on Top of the Pops, Volume 42 released in December 1974.
