= Lorna B =

British musician

Lorna Bannon
- Born: c. 1959; Dundee, Scotland
- Genres: Pop; Britfunk; Dance music
- Occupation: Singer
- Instrument: Vocals
- Years active: 1975–present

Lorna B (real name Lorna Osborne, née Bannon) is a pop singer from Dundee, Scotland.

== Music career ==
Under the name Sister B, she was a member of the funk group Rokotto while still at school, scoring two top 50 chart hits and twice appearing on Top of the Pops.

She later became a backing vocalist and singer on television themes (including children's' television show Fun House) and adverts, and also sang with Shakatak on the Night Birds album. In 1986, she was a member of The Future, a band which made the Song For Europe television final, and were "hotly tipped" to win with their song "War of the Roses"; however the regional juries placed the song last.

In 1995 she gained the biggest hits of her career, through being the credited vocalist on two top 40 singles with DJ Scott - "Do You Wanna Party" reaching number 36 and follow-up "Sweet Dreams" peaking one place lower.

In more recent years she has fronted a touring version of Middle of the Road.

== Personal life ==
She is married to singer/songwriter Gary Osborne, who was also a member of The Future. and had co-written "War of the Roses".
