= The Rubettes =

English pop band

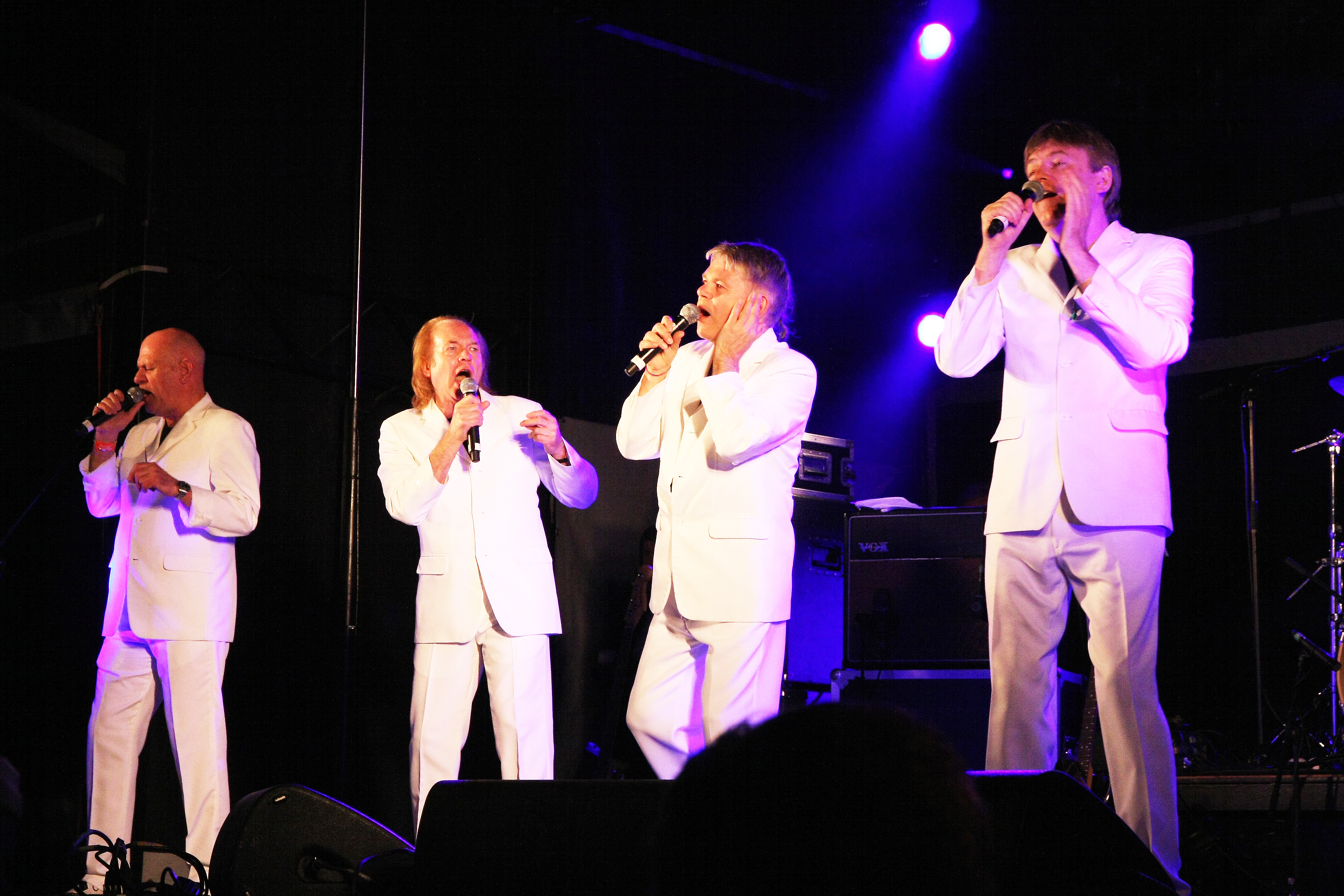
- The Rubettes in Concert, 2013

Background information
- Also known as: The Rubettes featuring Alan Williams (2000–present); The Rubettes featuring Bill Hurd (2000–present)
- Origin: England
- Genres: Pop rock, glam rock, rock and roll
- Years active: 1974–1980, 1982–1999, 2000–present
- Labels: Polydor Records, State Records, Sobel Nation Records
- Members: See Original personnel for the 1970s personnel and Different versions of the Rubettes for Alan Williams' and Bill Hurd's
- Past members: See Personnel section
- Website: www.rubettes.com rubettes.uk

The Rubettes are an English pop/glam rock band put together in 1974 after the release of "Sugar Baby Love", performed and recorded by studio session musicians in 1973 by the songwriting team of Wayne Bickerton, the then head of A&R at Polydor Records, and his co-songwriter, Tony Waddington after their doo-wop and 1950s American pop-influenced songs had been rejected by a number of existing acts. Waddington paired the group with manager John Morris, the husband of singer Clodagh Rodgers, and under his guidance, the band emerged at the end of the glam rock movement, wearing trademark white suits and cloth caps on stage. Their first release, "Sugar Baby Love", was an instant hit remaining at number one in the United Kingdom for four weeks in May 1974, while reaching number 37 on the US chart that August, and remains their best-known record. Subsequent releases were less successful, but the band toured well into the 2000s with two line-ups in existence.

== History ==
=== Classic era (1974–1980) ===
The Rubettes' first and biggest hit was "Sugar Baby Love" (1974), which was a number one in the United Kingdom, selling around 500,000 copies in the UK and three million copies globally. With three other songs, "Sugar Baby Love" was recorded for Polydor in October 1973 at Lansdowne Studios in Holland Park, London, by a group of session musicians featuring the distinctive falsetto and lead vocals of Paul Da Vinci (born Paul Leonard Prewer). However, Da Vinci did not join the others to become a member of the band put together by John Richardson, and instead pursued solo work, having signed a contract with Penny Farthing Records. "Sugar Baby Love" was their only UK No. 1 and sole US Top 40 entry.

For public appearances to promote the song, initially on Top of the Pops, Alan Williams took on the role of lead singer, being the only one of the original session singers able to duplicate Da Vinci's falsetto vocals. The Rubettes then comprised Williams, Richardson, and Pete Arnesen (all three of whom had participated in the original recording) together with Tony Thorpe, Mick Clarke, and Bill Hurd. In performance, the group wore distinctive white suits and white caps which, according to Williams, "were a practical addition to the ensemble ... [as] we all had long hair, which didn't suit the image we'd gone for ... We compromised by having our hair pinned up inside the caps".

Williams sang lead on later recordings, and the Rubettes went on to have a number of other top-ten hits across Europe during the mid-1970s, such as "Tonight", "Juke Box Jive" and "I Can Do It", mostly written by the Bickerton–Waddington songwriting team. The Rubettes' success encouraged Bickerton and Waddington to set up State Records, so that ten months after the release of "Sugar Baby Love", the fourth Rubettes single, "I Can Do It", was on State (catalogue reference STAT 1). In November 1974, NME music magazine reported that The Rubettes, The Glitter Band and Mud were among the UK bands who had roles in a new film titled Never Too Young to Rock.

In 1976 the band abandoned glam nostalgia to enter more serious territory. "Under One Roof" (1976) sung by John Richardson was a portrayal of a gay man disowned and later murdered by his father; along with Rod Stewart's "The Killing of Georgie" (1976), it was one of the few songs that tackled the topic of homophobia. Their most successful self-composed hit was the country rock-styled ballad "Baby I Know" (1977) sung by Tony Thorpe, which reached number 10 in the UK and Germany in 1977. During this period the band continued to cater to the much bigger European market by continuing to release more commercial pop singles all featuring lead vocals by Alan Williams, such as "Julia" (1976), "Allez Oop" (1976), and "Ooh La La" (1977). The band became a quintet in early 1975 with the departure of Arnesen, and later became a quartet in mid-1976 when Hurd departed the band; to this day the original band has never expanded its line-up beyond four members. Whilst the band continued as a four-piece, Hurd joined Suzi Quatro's band, touring and playing on a number of worldwide hits, which included the Top 20 success "She's in Love with You" in 1979, before re-joining the Rubettes in 1982.

In another attempt to get away from the 'doo-wop' glam image, Thorpe insisted that the trademark vocal harmonies be left off of his composition "You're the Reason Why". Gerry Shury and the band outvoted him. The version with no vocal backing has been available as a bootleg recording in certain parts of Europe. In 1979, Thorpe and the band separated over musical differences. Thorpe can be heard on lead vocals on the last Still Unwinding track, "Does It Gotta Be Rock 'N' Roll". His guitar parts and backing vocals remained. After Thorpe's departure, the group's success dwindled. The band replaced Thorpe with Bob Benham, but he departed shortly thereafter and the band dissolved in 1980.

=== Re-formation (1982–1999) ===
The band re-formed in 1982, with a line-up consisting of Williams, Clarke, Hurd, and drummer Alex Bines to exploit the German market for 1970s nostalgia. This line-up remained relatively stable until 1999, with the only line-up changes being the departure of Clarke in 1987, to be replaced first by Steve Kinch and then by Trevor Holliday, before he returned to the fold in 1993.

=== Separate projects (2000–present) ===
John Richardson, under the name Jayadev, has recorded as a session percussionist, and played on Tight Fit's version of "The Lion Sleeps Tonight".

In 2000, Williams and Hurd both formed their own versions of the Rubettes, which at the time both also included two members of the Rubettes in each group (Clarke and Richardson in Williams', Da Vinci and Bines in Hurd's). Due to legal issues, both versions of the band have to specify that their version is only led by them, by having the phrase "featuring __" after "The Rubettes".

In March 2012, Thorpe digitally released the No Hits, No Jazz Collection and performed at Darwen Library Theatre with a live eight-piece band for his "50th Anniversary 1-Gig-Tour". It featured session musicians Iain Reddy, Liam Barber, Justin Randall and Greg Harper. "You're the Reason Why" was played.

Tony Thorpe died on 18 July 2026, aged 80.

== Legal issues ==
In 2002, the group hit the headlines once more when, following an acrimonious split and legal action, the Rubettes became the latest in a long line of bands (including the Beach Boys and Spandau Ballet) to end up in the courts in a dispute over ownership of the band's name. The court ruled that both Williams and Hurd could tour as the Rubettes, as long as it was clear which member was fronting the band.

In 2005, Williams and Hurd were back in court following an appearance by Hurd's band on the German television station ZDF, with Williams claiming Hurd had breached the terms of the original agreement. On 2 February 2006, a High Court judge found that Hurd and Williams had both been guilty of breaching the 2002 agreement. Costs of the trial were, however, awarded to Williams in view of the severity of Hurd's breaches. Hurd appealed this decision, but on 3 November 2006, the Appeal Court in London ruled against him, awarding the costs of the appeal to Williams. Hurd has since gone bankrupt.

=== 2022 High Court ownership ruling ===
In July 2022 Alan Williams and his company won a High Court trial for the ownership of The Rubettes name, against Clarke, Richardson and Etherington. Sitting in the High Court in London, Judge Pat Treacy ruled for Williams and said: "The defendants' conduct amounts to a misrepresentation sufficient to engage the tort of passing off. The claimants have succeeded."

== Original personnel ==
=== The Rubettes (1973–1980, 1982–1999) ===
Former

- Alan Williams (born Alan James Williams, 22 December 1948, Welwyn Garden City, Hertfordshire) – guitars, vocals (1973–1980, 1982–1999)
- Pete Arnesen (born Hans Peter Arnesen, 25 August 1945, Salzburg, Austria) – keyboards (1973–1974)
- Tony Thorpe (born Anthony John Thorpe, 20 July 1945, St Bartholomew Hospital, Smithfield, London- 18 July 2026) – guitars, vocals (1974–1979)
- Mick Clarke (born Michael William Clarke, 10 August 1946, Grimsby, Lincolnshire) – bass, vocals (1973–1980, 1982–1987, 1993–1999)
- Bill Hurd (born William Frederick George Hurd, 11 August 1947, East Ham, East London) – keyboards, vocals (1974–1976, 1982–1999)
- John "Jayadev" Richardson (born John George Richardson, 3 May 1947, South Ockendon, Essex) – drums, vocals (1973–1980)
- Bob Benham – guitars, vocals (1979)
- Alex Bines – drums, vocals (1982–1999)
- Steve Kinch – bass, vocals (1987–1991)
- Trevor Holliday – bass, vocals (1991–1993)

Timeline

== Different versions of the Rubettes ==
=== The Rubettes featuring Alan Williams (2000–present) ===
The Rubettes featuring Alan Williams
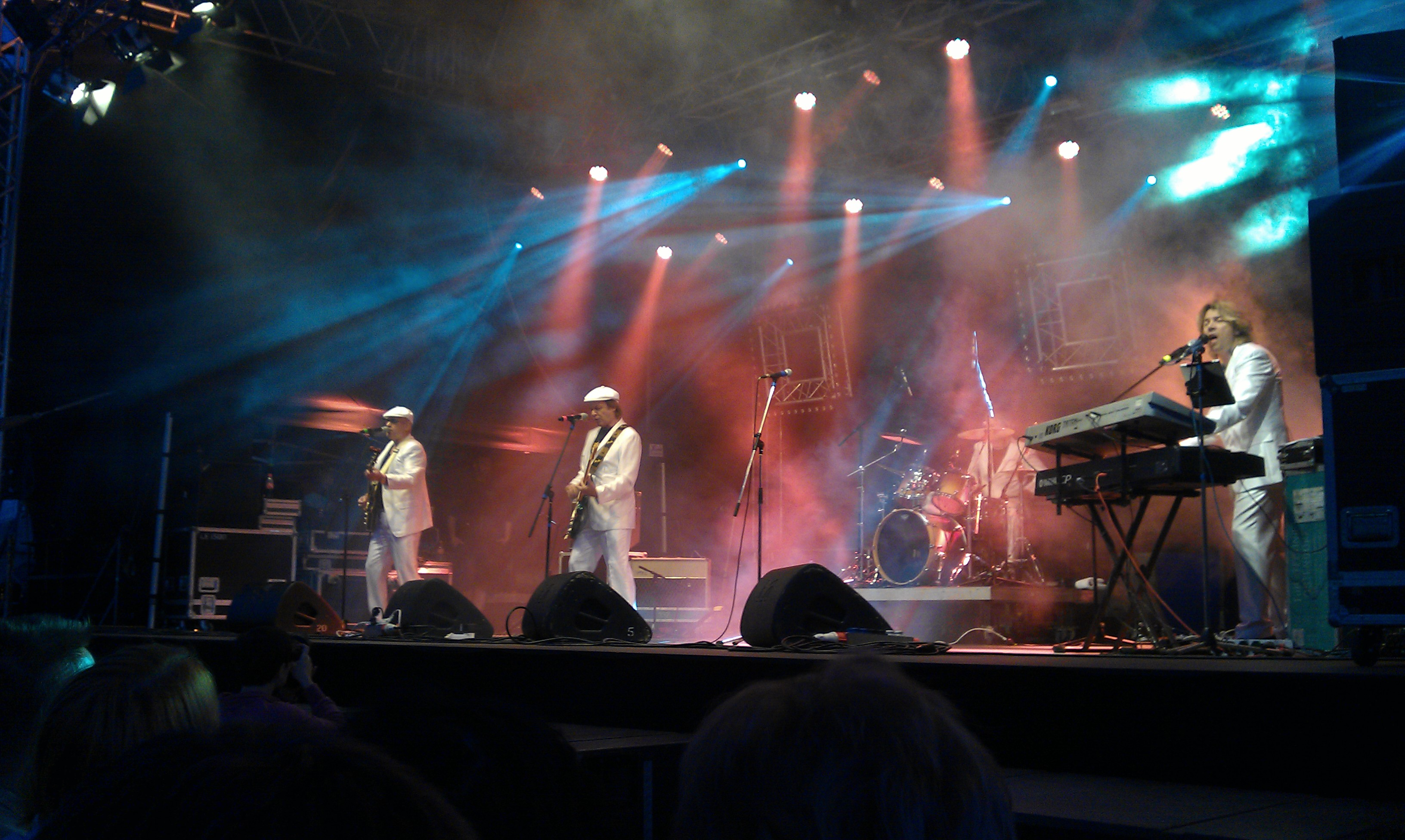
- The Rubettes featuring Alan Williams in 2015

Background information
- Years active: 2000-present
- Members: Alan Williams; Mark Haley; Laurie Haley; Glyn Davies; Spencer Lingwood
- Past members: John Richardson; Mick Clarke; Steve Etherington; Mark Haley

In 2000, Williams formed his version of the band along with Clarke, Richardson, and ex-Kinks keyboardist Mark Haley.

On 21 September 2014, as part of the Rubettes' 40th anniversary, it was announced that Alan Williams, John Richardson, and Mick Clarke would return to the Olympia in Paris, the same venue at which the Rubettes made their first appearance in France in 1974 when "Sugar Baby Love" topped the French and European charts.

The band broke up in February 2019. A new Rubettes was formed with the original members John Richardson, Mick Clarke, and Steve Etherington (producer/arranger since 1995).

Current members

- **Alan Williams** – guitars, vocals (2000–present)
- Glyn Davies (born 1959, Wednesbury, Staffordshire) – guitar, vocals (2019–present)
- Spencer Lingwood – drums, vocals (2019–present)
- Lawrence Haley – bass, vocals (2019–present)

Former members

- **John "Jayadev" Richardson** – drums, vocals (2000–2019)
- **Mick Clarke** – bass, vocals (2000–2019)
- Steve Etherington – keyboards, guitars, vocals (2015–2019)
- Mark Haley – keyboards, guitars, vocals (2000–2015)

Members of the original Rubettes are in bold

Timeline

=== The Rubettes featuring Bill Hurd (2000–present) ===
The Rubettes featuring Bill Hurd
- Years active: 2000–present
- Members: Bill Hurd; Damian Fisher; Dave Harding; Chris Staines; Mike Dagnall
- Past members: Alex Bines; Rufus Ruffell; Ian Pearce; Paul Da Vinci; George Bird; Paul Callaby; Ray Frost; John Sorrell; Yvan Silva; Mike Steed; Billy Hill; Martin Clapson; Kenny Butler; John Summerton

Following the dissolution of the original band, Hurd formed his version of the group with longtime drummer Alex Bines, vocalist Paul Da Vinci (who had performed lead vocal on "Sugar Baby Love"), bassist Billy Hill, and guitarist Rufus Rufell. Da Vinci departed the band in 2006 and was replaced by George Bird, and guitarist Rufell leaving in 2009 and replaced by Ian Pearce.

In June 2009, Bill Hurd's Rubettes played at the East Kilbride ArtBurst Festival.

In 2010, Bill Hurd's Rubettes covered the 1997 Thorpe composition "Where the Angels Fear to Tread" on their album 21st Century Rock 'n' Roll on Angel Air Records.

2013 saw the beginning of the most turbulent period in the band's history, as line-up instability was common for the next two years. First Bines, Hill, and Pearce all left the band to be replaced by Paul Callaby (drums), Ray Frost (guitars), and John Sorrell (bass) respectively, leaving Hurd as the last remaining "founding member" of his version of the group. Late 2013 saw Bird depart the band to be replaced by Yvan Silva. By mid-2013 the band underwent a major personnel upheaval again, as everyone other than Hurd departed the band.

The line-up then solidified with the arrival of vocalist Ken Butler, drummer Martin Clapson, and guitarist Dave Harding, with Mike Steed joining them on bass (on loan from The Marmalade) for a few months. The band line-up has remained fairly settled since 2014 with the only changes following the death of Ken Butler in 2018 saw the appointment of John Summerton (ex Flintlock) on guitar and vocals, and the arrival of drummer Damian Fisher.

Current

- **Bill Hurd** – keyboards, vocals (2000–present)
- Damian Fisher – drums, vocals (2017–2018, 2020–present)
- Dave Harding – guitar, vocals (2014–present)
- Chris Staines – bass, vocals (2015–2017, 2019–present)

Former

- **Alex Bines** – drums, vocals (2000–2013)
- Rufus Ruffell – guitars, vocals (2000–2009)
- Ian Pearce – guitars, vocals (2009–2013)
- **Paul Da Vinci** – vocals (2000–2006)
- George Bird – vocals (2006–2013)
- Paul Callaby – drums, vocals (2013–2014)
- Ray Frost – guitars, vocals (2013–2014)
- John Sorrell – bass, vocals (2013–2014)
- Yvan Silva – guitars, vocals (2013–2014)
- Mike Steed – bass, vocals (2014)
- Billy Hill – bass, vocals (2000–2013, 2017–2020)
- Martin Clapson – drums, vocals (2015–2017, 2018–2020)
- Kenny Butler – guitars, vocals – (2014–2018)
- John Summerton – guitar, vocals (2018–2021?)

Members of the original Rubettes are in bold

Timeline

=== The Rubettes featuring John, Mick, & Steve (2019–present) ===
The Rubettes featuring John, Mick & Steve
- Years active: 2019-present
- Members: John Richardson; Mick Clarke; Steve Etherington

In February 2019, founding members of "The Rubettes featuring Alan Williams" John Richardson, Mick Clarke, and Steve Etherington (who with the exception of Etherington are original members of the band) decided to break away from Alan Williams, and formed the Rubettes featuring John, Mick, and Steve. In 2020, the trio recorded, produced, and released their album "Glamnezia". They are currently the only version of the Rubettes to have released a full-length studio album.

- **John "Jayadev" Richardson** – drums, vocals
- **Mick Clarke** – bass, vocals
- Steve Etherington – keyboards, guitars, vocals

Members of the original Rubettes are in bold

== Discography ==
=== Studio albums ===
Title	Album details	Peak chart positions		
Title	Album details	UK	AUS	GER
Wear It's 'At	Released: 1974; Label: Polydor; Formats: LP, K7, CD	—	85	32
We Can Do It	Released: 1975; Label: Polydor; Formats: LP, K7, CD	41	—	31
Rubettes	Released: 1975; Label: Polydor; Formats: LP, K7, CD	—	—	—
Sign of the Times	Released: 1976; Label: Polydor; Formats: LP, K7, CD	—	—	—
Baby I Know	Released: 1977; Label: Polydor; Formats: LP, K7, CD	—	—	—
Sometime In Oldchurch	Released: 1978; Label: Polydor; Formats: LP, K7, CD	—	—	—
Still Unwinding	Released: 1978; Label: Polydor; Formats: LP	—	—	—
Shangri'la	Released: 1992; Label: Dice Records; Formats: LP	—	—	—
Riding on a Rainbow	Released: 1992; Label: Dice Records; Formats: LP, K7, CD	—	—	—
Making Love in the Rain	Released: 1995; Label: Dice Records; Formats: CD	—	—	—

Other Albums

- On Tour (October 2008) [Studio Album/Compilation + Bonus Tracks] CLCD002
- La Legende Continue (July 2016) [Studio Album/Compilation + Bonus Tracks] CLCD003

=== Singles ===
Year	Title	Peak chart positions									Album
Year	Title	UK	AUS	AUT	BEL	GER	NET	NOR	SWI	US	Album
1974	"Sugar Baby Love"	1	2	1	1	1	1	2	1	37	Wear It's 'At
1974	"Tonight"	12	98	13	3	4	4	5	—	—	Wear It's 'At
1974	"Juke Box Jive"	3	46	8	1	4	2	—	—	—	We Can Do It
1975	"I Can Do It"	7	89	7	5	3	5	—	6	—	We Can Do It
1975	"Foe-Dee-Oh-Dee"	15	—	8	7	6	7	—	—	—	Rubettes
1975	"Little Darling"	30	—	—	7	22	19	—	—	—	Rubettes
1976	"You're the Reason Why"	28	—	—	6	22	7	—	—	—	Sign of the Times
1976	"Julia"	—	—	—	—	—	—	—	—	—	Sign of the Times
1976	"Under One Roof"	40	—	—	28	30	—	—	—	—	Baby I Know
1976	"Allez Oop"	—	—	—	25	—	—	—	—	—	Baby I Know
1976	"Dark Side of the World"	—	—	—	—	—	—	—	—	—	Rubettes
1976	"Rock Is Dead"	—	—	—	—	—	—	—	—	—	Wear It's 'At
1977	"Baby I Know"	10	—	—	25	34	—	—	—	—	Baby I Know
1977	"Ooh La La"	—	—	—	—	16	—	—	—	—	Baby I Know
1977	"Ladies of Laredo"	—	—	—	—	—	—	—	—	—	Baby I Know
1977	"Come on Over"	—	—	—	—	—	—	—	—	—	Sometime in Oldchurch
1977	"Cherie Amour"	—	—	—	—	39	—	—	—	—	—N/a
1978	"Little 69"	—	—	—	—	37	—	—	—	—	—N/a
1978	"Sometime in Oldchurch"	—	—	—	—	—	—	—	—	—	Sometime in Oldchurch
1978	"Goodbye Dolly Gray"	—	—	—	—	—	—	—	—	—	Still Unwinding
1978	"Movin"	—	—	—	—	—	—	—	—	—	Still Unwinding
1979	"Lola"	—	—	—	—	—	—	—	—	—	—N/a
1979	"Stay With Me"	—	—	—	—	—	—	—	—	—	—N/a
1979	"Kid Runaway"	—	—	—	—	—	—	—	—	—	Shangri'la
1981	"Stuck on You"	—	—	—	—	—	—	—	—	—	—N/a
1981	"Rockin' Rubettes Party 45"	—	—	—	—	—	—	—	—	—	—N/a
1981	"I Can't Give You Up"	—	—	—	—	—	—	—	—	—	—N/a
1982	"Don't Come Crying"	—	—	—	—	—	—	—	—	—	—N/a
1985	"Rockin' Rubettes Party 45"	—	—	—	—	—	—	—	—	—	—N/a
1989	"New Way of Loving You"	—	—	—	—	—	—	—	—	—	Making Love in the Rain
1989	"Megamix"	—	—	—	—	—	—	—	—	—	—N/a
1992	"I Never Knew"	—	—	—	—	—	—	—	—	—	Shangri'la
1992	"Radio Mix"	—	—	—	—	—	—	—	—	—	—N/a
1993	"Oh So Lonely"	—	—	—	—	—	—	—	—	—	Riding on a Rainbow
2019

== See also ==
- List of artists who reached number one on the UK singles chart
- List of one-hit wonders in the United States
- List of performers on Top of the Pops
