= DJ Scott =

British musician

Scott Robertson
- Born: c. 1971–72; Scotland
- Genres: Eurodance; Dance music
- Occupation: Producer
- Years active: 1992–96
- Labels: Steppin' Out Records

DJ Scott (real name Scott Robertson) is Scottish music producer, who was credited with two top 40 hits in 1995.

== Music career ==
DJ Scott started his own club, Zen, in Scotland in 1992, and worked on the rave music scene for the next two years.

In 1995 he registered two top 40 singles, on the Dalkieth label Steppin' Out, with vocalist Lorna B; "Do You Wanna Party" reached number 36 and follow-up "Sweet Dreams" peaked one place lower. "Do You Wanna Party" had been released unsuccessfully in 1993 and 1994, but a remix by N-Trance turned it into a hit.

He had a third hit single in 1996, credited as DJ Scott and Outer Rhythm, called "Let's Make It Happen", but this time he fell short of the top 40, spending a sole chart week at 89.
