= Hilton Birmingham Metropole =

Hotel in Birmingham

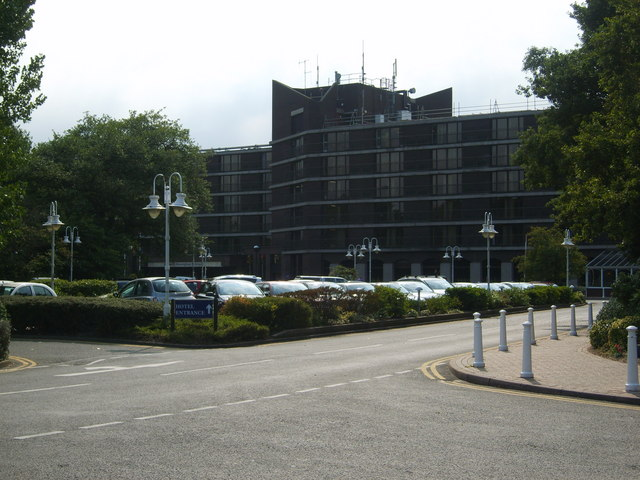
- Interactive map of the Hilton Birmingham Metropole area
- Hotel chain: Hilton Hotels & Resorts

General information
- Type: Hotel
- Location: Pendigo Way, Solihull, Birmingham, England
- Coordinates: 52.450701°N 1.715337°W
- Opened: 2 February 1976
- Owner: Henderson Park

Technical details
- Floor count: 5

Design and construction
- Architect: R Seifert & Partners

Other information
- Number of rooms: 790

Website
- Official website

The Hilton Birmingham Metropole is the largest hotel in England outside London, with 790 rooms and suites, and approximately 6,000 m^{2} (65,000 sq ft) of conference halls.

== History ==
The Birmingham Metropole hotel opened in 1976. The current hotel was originally built as two adjacent hotels. The Warwick block was originally called the Warwick Hotel. The hotels remained separate until 1987–88 when they were connected by a glazed tunnel and the two hotels were merged under the Metropole brand.

The hotels were operated by Metropole Hotels until 1996 when Lonrho sold the chain to Stakis Hotels, which renamed the hotel Stakis Birmingham Metropole. Ladbroke bought Stakis in 1999 and rebranded the 48 Stakis Hotels within their Hilton Hotels brand, with the property renamed Hilton Birmingham Metropole. Hilton sold the hotel, along with the Hilton London Metropole, to the Tonstate Group in 2006 for £417m. Tonstate sold the two properties to Henderson Park for £500 million in 2017.

== Renovations ==
The Kings Suite extension was built in 1985–86. The car park was redesigned and the car park kiosk and walled borders were built in 1988–89. An extension was added in 1988–89 which now includes executive rooms. The main entrance, concierge and lounge were extended and rebuilt in 1993–94. The swimming pool and health club were constructed in 1994–95; the swimming pool was designed and built by Rydal Engineering. The conservatory extension was built in 1998–99.
