= Paul Da Vinci =

British singer and musician

- Born: Paul Leonard Prewer; 18 May 1951 (age 75); Thurrock, Essex, England, United Kingdom
- Genres: Rock and roll, pop, glam rock
- Occupation: Singer songwriter composer
- Years active: 1969–present
- Formerly of: The Rubettes
- Website: https://www.pauldavinci.com/

Paul Da Vinci (born Paul Leonard Prewer; 30.03.1951) is a British singer and musician. He is best known as the lead singer on the 1974 hit recording by the Rubettes, "Sugar Baby Love", although he did not perform with the group at the time. He worked as a demo and session singer before and after his own successful solo career, that included "Your Baby Ain't Your Baby Anymore", which peaked at number 20 in the UK Singles Chart in August 1974 and number 54 in Australia. In the 1980s, Da Vinci sang most of the voices backing and lead on the Tight Fit hit "Back to the Sixties, Part 2", and performed on Top of the Pops with the group.

== Biography ==
He was born in Grays, Thurrock, Essex, and in 1969 recorded two singles on the Big T label as singer with the group 1984. After the group broke up in about 1970, he started working as a session singer in London, making demo records for songwriters Tony Macaulay and others. He also sang on many advertising jingles, and on recordings by musicians including Gary Moore, Ringo Starr, Barry Blue and David Essex; and appeared on Top of the Pops with both Elton John and Justin Hayward.

In late 1973, he sang on a demo recording of "Sugar Baby Love", written and produced by Wayne Bickerton and Tony Waddington and initially offered to Showaddywaddy, who turned the song down. Bickerton and Waddington then offered it to the demo musicians, provided that they became an actual group, the Rubettes. Although the other musicians agreed, Da Vinci turned down the opportunity to perform with the group as, by the time of Sugar Baby Love's release in 1974, he had signed a solo contract with Penny Farthing Records. "Sugar Baby Love" featured Da Vinci's striking falsetto (he also sang all of the low vocal plus the two part harmony on the record), but Alan Williams, who sang backing vocals on the record, appeared on Top of the Pops as the lead singer (some say miming, though this is disputed). The record became a UK number one hit in 1974, also reaching number 37 on the US pop chart. Da Vinci also sang the lead vocal on the B-side of the record "You Could Have Told Me". He issued his first solo single, "Your Baby Ain't Your Baby Anymore", which he co-wrore and co-produced with Edward Seago, and reached number 20 on the UK Singles Chart. It was a hit in several other European countries, including being at number one in the Netherlands. However, its follow-up, "If You Get Hurt", was less successful. He moved to Epic Records in 1977 and released two singles, but again without chart success.

He continued as a session singer and songwriter. In 1978 he co-wrote "Anyway You Do It" for the group Liquid Gold, and in 1981 he sang lead on the Tight Fit hit, "Back to the Sixties Part 2". In 1983, he appeared in the West End musical Dear Anyone, written by Don Black and Geoff Stephens. Between 1990 and 1994 he sang in Trevor Payne's touring show That'll Be The Day. He also sang on Jeff Wayne's Musical Version of Spartacus in 1992, appeared as the narrator of the West End production of The Who's Tommy in 1997, and, with his band, opened for Fats Domino in performances at the Royal Albert Hall. Between 2000 and 2006, he performed with the Rubettes featuring Bill Hurd, touring the UK and Europe. Also, during the period of 2000 and 2008, he frequently appeared as a starring act in the Theatres on P&O Cruises, QE2, Princess Cruises and Royal Caribbean.

In the 1990s, he wrote several pieces for cello and piano, including a three movement tone poem "Visions of Aaron" which was performed at the Purcell Room in London, and also a concerto, Hope, performed and recorded by the Innovation Chamber Ensemble and later performed at the Wigmore Hall. He has also written and produced music for performers including Angelle, and performed with his own group, Da Vinci & The Justice Department, who released an album in 2009.

Da Vinci's show The Paul da Vinci Explosion started touring in 2016, and appeared in April 2018 on a joint bill with Gary Puckett and The Union Gap at the Benidorm Palace.

He lives in Somerset.
