= Betty Moon =

Canadian-American singer-songwriter

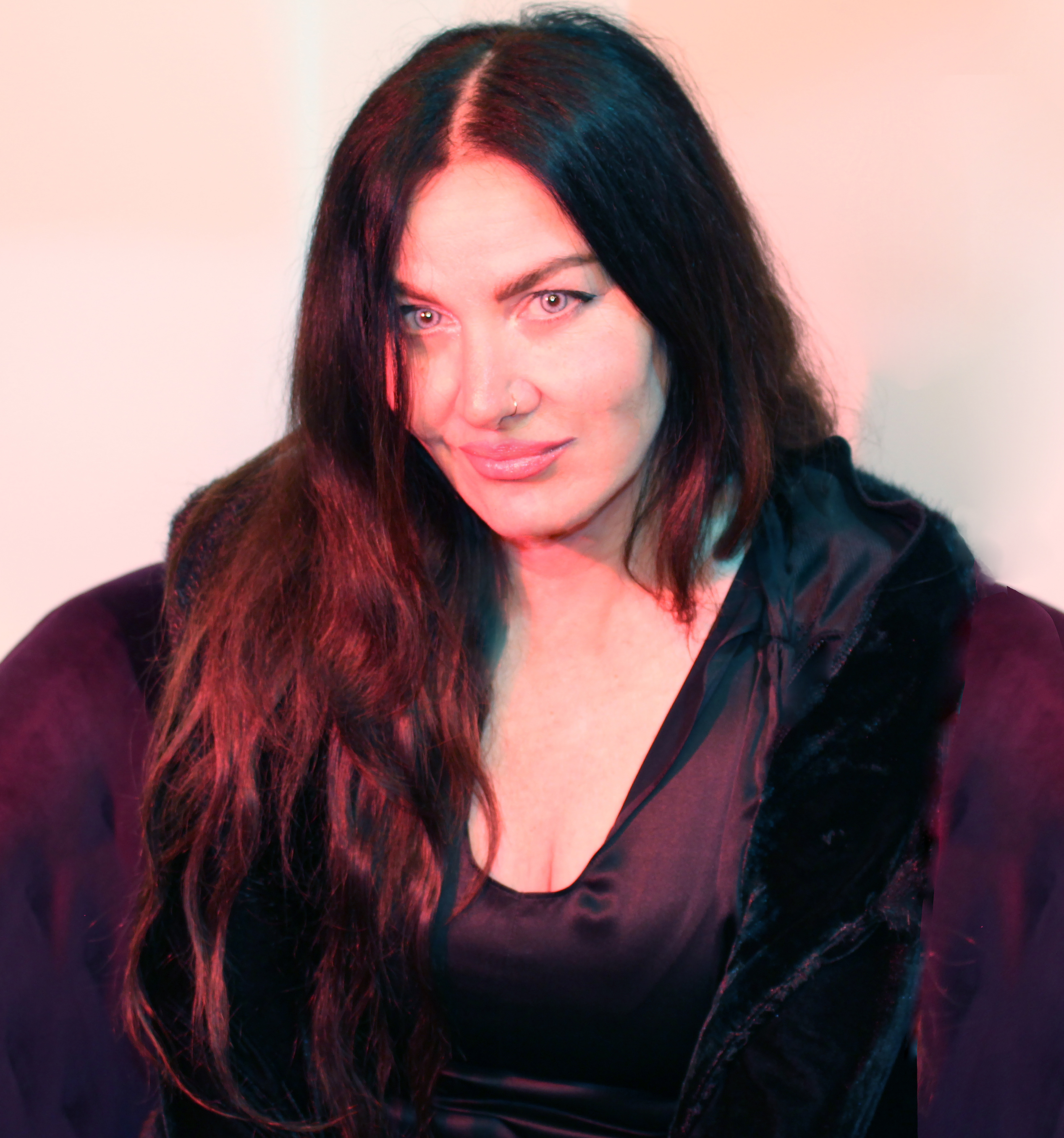

Background information
- Origin: Toronto, Ontario, Canada
- Genres: Alternative; Pop; Rock; Dance
- Years active: 1991–present
- Labels: Evolver Music Inc.; A&M Records
- Website: bettymoon.com

Betty Moon is a Canadian-American singer, songwriter, and producer who is currently based in Los Angeles. In the early 1990s, she was signed to A&M Records and later started her own production company and record label, Evolver Music, Inc. She has released eleven studio albums, including her most recent project, Undercover, in 2022.

== Early life and education ==
Betty Moon was born and raised in Toronto, Ontario, Canada. Her father was a restaurateur and fellow musician who immigrated to New York City and later Toronto from Alexandria, Egypt. She learned multiple instruments as a teenager and began recording songs as a singer-songwriter. A recording studio known as The Coachhouse was located on her home property growing up. Her brother, Armando Borg, is also a musician who played in the band, I Mother Earth. Moon attended George Brown College, earning a degree in theatre arts. She was later accepted into the Humber College jazz music program. Moon also modeled and took part in fashion shows during this time.

== Career ==
While at Humber College, Moon formed the minimalist punk band, Bambi. The group released an album entitled Rock On in 1986 and its titular lead single, a cover of David Essex's "Rock On", received airplay on Toronto's CFNY-FM. The music video for the song also appeared on MuchMusic, Toronto Rocks, MTV, and The NewMusic. The album itself sold around 10,000 units.

The success of Rock On led Moon to signing a record deal with A&M Records as a solo artist. As part of the deal, her sublabel, Azumuve, became an imprint of A&M. She released her self-titled, debut album on the label in 1991. Two singles, "I Get High" and "One Kiss", received airplay and reached the 11th spot on Canada's MuchMusic chart. A nationwide tour in support of the album culminated in a show with Pink Floyd in Toronto. After PolyGram purchased A&M Records in 1992, it opted to drop all sublabels, including Moon's. In the mid-1990s, Moon formed her own independent record label, Violet Records.

In 1997, she released her second studio album, STIR, through Violet Records and St. Clair Entertainment Group. The album featured Glenn Milchem of Blue Rodeo on drums. She went on another nationwide tour in support of the album. Soon after the album's release, she became a partner in the Toronto-based recording studio, Wellesley Sound Studios. Her third album, Doll Machine, was released in 2003 by Sextant Records and EMI. In 2005, she founded Evolver Music, Inc., a production company and record label that would be a vehicle for her music and video production. She released her first album (The Demon Flowers) on the Evolver label in 2006.

In 2010, Moon relocated to Los Angeles and released her fifth studio album, Rollin' Revolution. The album featured contributions from several prominent musicians, including Kenny Aronoff, Yogi Lonich (Buckcherry), and Wes Scantlin (Puddle of Mudd). Some songs on the album received airplay on L.A.'s KROQ-FM. In 2011, Betty Moon and her live band performed at numerous L.A.-area venues, including Whisky a Go Go, El Rey Theatre, The Viper Room, and the Roxy Theatre. Moon also played at the Sunset Strip Music Festival that year.

In 2014, she released her sixth album, Amourphous, which was followed by her next project, Pantomania, in 2015. The latter album featured the single, "No Good", a cover of Depeche Mode's "It's No Good". In 2017, Moon released two new singles, "Liar" and "Sound". They both appeared on her eighth studio album, Chrome, later that year. In 2019, she released her 9th album, Hellucination, which featured the single, "Save My Soul" along with a remix of that track. In June 2020, Moon released an EP entitled Translucent and the album Little Miss Hollywood with the lead single, "Don't Stop Now". In 2021 Betty Moon released the album Cosmicoma and in 2022 she released Undercover, which is a collection of her best cover tracks from recent years. Over the course of her career, Moon's music has been used for various film and television soundtracks, including Dexter, Californication, Walking the Dead, Last Gasp, and Teen Mom: Young and Pregnant (among others).

== Discography ==
=== Studio albums ===
List of studio albums with selected details
Title	Details
Betty Moon	Released: June 25, 1991 (US/CAN); Label: A&M Records/Azumuve; Formats: CD
STIR	Released: January 1, 1997 (US/CAN); Label: Violet Records/St. Clair; Formats: CD
Doll Machine	Released: September 25, 2003 (US/CAN); Label: Sextant/EMI; Formats: CD
The Demon Flowers	Released: 2006 (US); Label: Evolver Music; Formats: CD, Digital download
Rollin' Revolution	Released: October 5, 2010 (US); Label: Evolver Music; Formats: CD, Digital download
Amourphous	Released: February 14, 2014 (US); Label: Evolver Music; Formats: CD, Digital download
Pantomania	Released: July 28, 2015 (US); Label: Evolver Music; Formats: CD, Digital download
Chrome	Released: August 25, 2017 (US); Label: Evolver Music; Formats: CD, Digital download
Hellucination	Released: May 17, 2019 (US); Label: Evolver Music; Formats: CD, Digital download
Little Miss Hollywood	Released: July 31, 2020 (US); Label: Evolver Music; Formats: Digital download
Cosmicoma	Released: May 21, 2021 (US); Label: Evolver Music; Formats: Digital download
Undercover	Released: January 28, 2022 (US); Label: Evolver Music; Formats: Digital download

==== As member of Bambi ====
List of studio albums with selected details
Title	Details
Rock On	Released: 1986 (US/CAN); Label: Azumuve; Formats: LP

=== EPs ===
List of EPs with selected details
Title	Details
Translucent	Released: June 12, 2020 (US); Label: Evolver Music; Formats: CD, Digital download

=== Singles ===
List of singles with selected details
Title	Year	Album
"I Get High"	1991	Betty Moon
"One Kiss"	1991	Betty Moon
"My Stupid Dream"	2010	Rollin' Revolution
"Drink Your Fears Away"	2010	Rollin' Revolution
"Time to Move On"	2014	Amourphous
"No Good"	2015	Pantomania
"Fire Hose"	2015	Pantomania
"Liar"	2017	Chrome
"Sound"	2017	Chrome
"Sound (remix)"	2017	Chrome
"Save My Soul"	2019	Hellucination
"Crazy (What You Make Me)"	2019	Hellucination
"Save My Soul (remix)"	2019	Hellucination
"Don't Stop Now"	2020	Translucent
"My Only One"	2021	Cosmicoma
"Fear Takes Control"	2021	Chrome
