= Spark (British record label) =

- Parent company: Southern Music
- Founded: 1967
- Founder: Bob Kingston
- Distributor(s): Decca, Selecta
- Genre: Various
- Country of origin: England

Spark was a British record label that was formed in 1967. It was active throughout the 1960s and 1970s. Some of the artists that had releases on the label included The Artwoods, Killing Floor, Gene Latter, Sheila McKinlay, Mighty Dodos, Keith Michell, Sparrow, and Venus and the Razorblades.

== Background ==
Founded by Bob Kingston in 1967, Spark was a division of Southern Music. Their records were pressed and distributed by Decca. Selecta was also a distributor for the label. It was overseen by Bob Kingston and Freddie Power.

Making their debut on the market in 1968, the executives were tight lipped on their first releases. They were to be revealed at the international music industry at MIDEM in Cannes later in January 1968.

== History ==
It was reported by Billboard in the June 1, 1968 issue that Southern Music, the parent co. of Spark Records had now moved into the stage musical field. They were publishing the music score of Andrew Lloyd Webber and Tim Rice which was "The Likes of Us, which was to premiere in Dublin later in 1968. Former vocalist with the Ted Heath Orchestra and publisher, Bob Britton was the professional manager for Southern. Spark was seeking and developing new talent. It was also noted that Freddie Poser who ran his own enterprise, Poser Music company and had been with Mills Music for some years had recently taken the position of manager for the label. Barry Kingston who was the managing director's son was in charge of the Meridian department which would produce independent records for the Spark label as well as major labels.

== Releases ==
The single for A New Generation, "Smokey Blues Away" bw" She's a Soldier Boy" was released on Spark SRL 1007 in 1968. It was reviewed by Peter Jones in the May 18 issue of Record Mirror. Calling it an unusual release, Jones said that a lot of folk were rootin' for it but said it will need dee-jay support and careful listening to get the maximum impact. Saying he liked the song a lot, he gave it seven stars. Released in the United States on Imperial 66317, it was also later reviewed by Cash Box in the September 7 issue with the reviewer saying it was "destined for heavy Top 40 play with sales to follow". Spending five weeks in the UK Singles Chart, it peaked at number 38 that year.

In April 1971, the Mighty Dodos had a single, "Honey (I Need Your Love)" bw "You Don't Love Me" released on Spark SRL 1051. Composed by Byrne and Davis, this soul copy single was produced by Barry Kingston. The composers were actually Conan Byrne aka Con Byrne and Warren Davis of the Warren Davis Monday Band. Also in 1971, Les Charles (later known as Billy Ocean) had the single "Nashville Rain" bw "Never Is Such a Long Time" released on Spark SRL 1050.

The marching band, Band of the Black Watch, recorded an album, Scotch on the Rocks which was released on Spark in 1975. It made it into the Record World England Top 25 album chart.
