= Wear It's 'At =

Studio album by The Rubettes
- Released: December 1974
- Genre: Glam rock; pop rock
- Length: 40:41; 47:15 (with bonus tracks)
- Label: Polydor
- Producer: Wayne Bickerton

The Rubettes chronology
Wear It's 'At (1974)	We Can Do It (1975)

Wear It's 'At is the debut album by English glam rock band the Rubettes assembled in 1973 by the songwriting team of Wayne Bickerton, then the head of A&R at Polydor Records, and his co-songwriter, Tony Waddington, after their doo-wop and 1950s American pop-influenced songs had been rejected by a number of existing acts. Tracks from this album also exhibited the doo-wop style. The album title was a reference to the group's wearing trademark white suits and white cloth caps on stage, a white cap being shown on the album front cover.

The album reached No. 32 in the German charts and No. 42 in the Netherlands on its release in 1974. A track from the album, "Sugar Baby Love", was an instant singles hit remaining at number one in the United Kingdom for four weeks in May 1974, while reaching No. 37 on the US chart that August, and remains their best-known record.

In 1992, Dice Records (France) released the Rubettes' first two albums (Wear It's 'At and We Can Do It) as a double CD set. In 2010 Cherry Red Records issued the album Wear It's 'At on CD with two bonus tracks. In 2015, Caroline Records released the album Wear It's 'At, with the same two bonus tracks, as part of a box CD set of the Rubettes' first five studio albums.

== Track listing ==
Side 1

1. "Way Back in the Fifties" (Wayne Bickerton, Tony Waddington) – 3:37
2. "Rock is Dead" (Wayne Bickerton, Tony Waddington) – 3:09
3. "Tonight" (Wayne Bickerton, Tony Waddington) – 3:42
4. "The Way of Love" (John Richardson, Alan Williams) – 3:19
5. "Rumours" (John Richardson, Alan Williams) – 2:30
6. "Your Love" (Pete Arnesen) – 5:27

Side 2

1. "For Ever" (John Richardson, Alan Williams) – 3:59
2. "Sugar Baby Love" (Wayne Bickerton, Tony Waddington) – 3:31
3. "Teenage Dream" (Jon Richardson, Alan Williams) – 3:01
4. "Rock and Roll Survival" (John Richardson, Alan Williams) – 3:22
5. "When You’re Sixteen" (Wayne Bickerton, Tony Waddington) – 2:46
6. "Saturday Night" (Wayne Bickerton, Tony Waddington) – 2:18

=== 2010 and 2015 CD bonus tracks ===
13. "You Could Have Told Me" (Waddington, Bickerton) – 2:48
14. "Silent Movie Queen" (Williams, Richardson) – 3:46

NB: All track times taken from CD track list

== Charts ==
Chart (1974/75)	Peak position
Australia (Kent Music Report)	85
Germany	32
The Netherlands	42

== Singles ==
1. "Sugar Baby Love" b/w "You Could Have Told Me" – January 1974 – UK No. 1, US Billboard Hot 100 No. 37, US Cashbox No. 30
2. "Tonight" b/w "Silent Movie Queen" – July 1974 – UK No. 12

== Personnel ==
- Alan Williams – vocals, guitar
- John Richardson – drums, vocals
- Mick Clarke – bass, vocals
- Tony Thorpe – lead guitar, vocals
- Pete Arnesen – piano
- Bill Hurd – piano, vocals

Of the original Rubettes line-up only Richardson, Williams and Arnesen participated in the recording of "Sugar Baby Love" although all members featured on the Top of the Pops re-recording for playback purposes.

== Publishers (including bonus tracks) ==
- Tracks 1, 3, 10, 12, 13 & 14 – Pamscene Ltd/Sony-ATV Music
- Tracks 2, 7, 8 & 11 – Warner Brothers Music/Warner Chappell/Arlovol Music
- Tracks 4, 5 & 9 – Sony-ATV Music
- Track 6 – Copyright Control

== Production and credits ==
- Producer: Wayne Bickerton
- Recorded at: Morgan Studios & Lansdowne Studios
- String arrangements: John Cameron ("Tonight"), Arthur Greenslade ("Your Love" & "When You're Sixteen") and Gerry Shury ("Sugar Baby Love").
- Engineer: John Mackswith
- Album photography: Mike Putland and Mike Leale
