= Penny Farthing Records =

British independent record label

Penny Farthing Records was a British independent record label, established in 1969 by the British record producer Larry Page as a progression from his mildly successful 1960s record label, Page One Records. The label signed some artists of note. It released a number of hit songs, including "Venus" by Shocking Blue, "Beautiful Sunday" by Daniel Boone, "Blue Is the Colour" by the Chelsea football team, and "Sleepy Shores" by the Johnny Pearson and His Orchestra.

== History ==
Page first founded Page One Records with Dick James in 1966, but left the company in 1969 to start a new label. He bought the name of another company Penny Farthing to use it for his label, and located the headquarters on Tilney Street.

Penny Farthing Records had its first success with their second single released in 1969, which was "Venus" by the Dutch group, Shocking Blue.

In 1970, Penny Farthing Records released the single, "Sister Simon (Funny Man)" PEN 738, by the UK group Heatwave (later known as The Sensations). While the a-side received airplay, the funky b-side, "Rastus Ravel", was well received in the clubs. Both songs were written and produced by John Edward for Instant Sound Productions. The single featured Maggie Stredder and Jean Ryder of The Ladybirds with Doris Troy as back-up singers. The group was a regular on the BBC Radio Terry Wogan, Dave Cash, Jimmy Young and Radio 1 Club shows. In 1970, Killing Floor's second album, Out of Uranus, was released on Penny Farthing Records.

The former Honeybus bassist, Colin Hare, released an album March Hare on Penny Farthing in 1971, which was not a commercial success. It was re-released through Hare's own Runfast label in 2004.

Daniel Boone's "Beautiful Sunday" (written by the singer) and released in 1972, was a staple of early 1970s disc jockeys. Picked up by the Japanese TV show Beautiful Sunday some ten years later, this song was re-popularized in Japan. Page also recorded Daniel's wife (Lesley) Lelly Boone, but with no success despite an appearance on BBC TV's Top of the Pops.

In 1971, Larry Page also signed up Johnny Pearson and released a stream of easy listening albums, the last of these being released in 1982. Pearson is notable as being the pianist and arranger behind British studio outfit Sounds Orchestral. The Johnny Pearson Orchestra's track, "Sleepy Shores", was a No. 8 hit in the UK Singles Chart for Penny Farthing in 1971, and an album of the same name was released the following year.

Page also recorded The Barron Knights, whose comedy records had some UK chart success. However, Page's attempts to turn them into a mainstream pop group failed. He eventually resorted to the flop "The Ballad of Frank Spencer". Even his attempt to record them under another name – Philly Dog – did not produce the desired hits.

Paul Da Vinci, the voice on The Rubettes hit "Sugar Baby Love", turned to Penny Farthing immediately after this song made the UK no. 1 slot. The resulting "Your Baby Ain't Your Baby Anymore" sold modestly.

Page One Records stalwarts The Troggs were persuaded to join Penny Farthing but their label debut, Page's attempt at the Beach Boys hit "Good Vibrations" with Reg Presley's vocals, did not produce sizeable sales.

Penny Farthing also recorded an early album by Raymond Froggatt. However, most of the company's revenue was gained from Germany, where their solo artist signing Kincade had a number of minor hits, including "Dreams Are 10 A Penny", "Big Hand For Annie" written by John Carter. Carter, writing under a number of different names, also had hits with Penny Farthing in the early 1970s.

Page formed Rampage Records as a successor for Penny Farthing in 1978.

== See also ==
- List of record labels
