= Enormous (band) =

English indie power pop band

- Origin: Mansfield, England
- Genres: Indie rock Indie pop Power pop
- Years active: 1992–present
- Labels: Beatific Records; Big Arena Records
- Spinoff of: Slaughterhouse 5
- Members: Davy Lawrence - Lead Vocals, Guitar, Songwriter, Engineer; Mike Ridley-Dash - Bass, Vocals; Graham Boffey - Drums, Vocals; Travis Peters - Keyboards, Vocals; Paul Varga - Saxophone; Ashley Morgan - Trumpet
- Past members: David Graham - Bass; Steve O'Toole - Guitar; Craig Denholm - Bass; Simon Tate-Lovery - Trombone; Matt Roberts - Trumpet (Dep); Steve Giles - Bass; Stephen Capes - Keyboard

Enormous is an indie, power pop band from Derby, England.

== Background ==
Enormous was formed out of the band Slaughterhouse 5 from Mansfield, England in 1992 by Davy Lawrence (vocals, guitar), Graham Boffey (drums, vocals), David Graham (vocals, bass) and Steve O'Toole (guitar, vocals), later joined in 1996 by Paul Varga (tenor saxophone) and Ashley Morgan (trumpet).

Enormous cite their influences as Ray Davies, Difford & Tilbrook, Burt Bacharach, The Beatles, Nick Lowe and Elvis Costello. Their classic pop songs are reminiscent of Buzzcocks, The Kinks, Squeeze, Madness, The Smiths, The Wonder Stuff, Blur, The Cure, The Divine Comedy, The Teardrop Explodes, and The Clash.

During 1996, David Graham (bass, vocals) left the band to join the Royal Air Force and was replaced by Craig Denholm (bass, vocals). Steve Foster, of Bandwagon Studios, Mansfield, England, brought together four music groups, under one banner named The Red Collective, featuring: Enormous; Ease; The Swells; and The Kerrys. Enormous formed the backbone and were signed to Beatific Records in 1997, recording a various artists compilation album Cigarette Machine From God (1997) at Mansfield's Bandwagon Studios. Their songs were critically acclaimed, receiving music reviews by The Sunday Times and Mojo.

After 2003, Steve O'Toole and Craig Denholm departed and the remaining band members took a three-year break to follow their own projects. By 2006, the band had reformed and was signed by the independent record label, Big Arena Records, for the purpose of re-releasing their entire back catalogue. In 2008, two temporary band members, Steve Giles (bass, vocals) and Stephen Capes (keyboards) were recruited, and the band played a sold-out homecoming gig in Mansfield at the Town Mill venue, on 20 November 2008. New bassist Mike Ridley-Dash joined in December 2009, and Travis Peters (keyboards) joined the band in 2010.

== Discography ==
=== Compilation albums ===
- Cigarette Machine From God - The Red Collective (Beatific Records, 1997) B-TIFIC001. ASIN: B000024VW8
1. It's Gonna Happen
2. Something In My Heart
3. When You Do
4. Happy Birthday, Asshole

=== Studio albums ===
- Electric Baby Grand (Big Arena Records, 1999 & 2006)
1. It's All Coming True
2. Being Very Fair
3. Believe Her
4. Things I Can't Forget
5. Never Coming Back
6. You Do Too Much
7. Finders Keepers
8. Sharon, You're A Shit
9. I Tried Everything
10. When You Get To Know Me
11. Everything Hangs On You
- Situation: Comedy (Big Arena Records, 2000 & 2006)
1. Let's Run Away Together
2. When You Do
3. Kill Me, I Love You
4. Everything's All Right
5. Used
6. Sooner Or Later
7. Give The Boy A Chance
8. Your Weird Stuff
9. Happy Birthday, Asshole
10. Stand Up
11. I Gave Up On Love
- Almost Everything (Big Arena Records, 2006)
1. Been Around
2. The Way That It Should Be
3. Something In My Heart
4. Fingers And Thumbs
5. Right Behind You
6. It Would Be Good
7. Still Believe
8. The Two Of Us
9. My Type
10. I'm Your Biggest Fan
11. It's Gonna Happen

=== Singles and EPs ===
- My Type (EP UK, Beatific Records, 1998) B-TIFIC002
1. My Type
2. Something In My Heart
3. Your Weird Stuff
4. I Gave Up On Love
- Let's Run Away Together (EP UK, Big Arena Records, 2000 & 2006)
1. Let's Run Away Together
2. When You Get To Know Me
3. Sharon, You're A Shit
- Been Around (EP UK, Big Arena Records, 2006)
1. Been Around
2. Me And My Big Mouth
- It Would Be Good (EP UK, Big Arena Records, 2006)
1. It Would Be Good
2. My Type (Thrash Mix)
- Something In My Heart (EP UK, Big Arena Records, 2006)
1. Something In My Heart
2. Things She Did
3. Poor Me
- The Way That It Should Be (EP UK, Big Arena Records, 2006)
1. The Way That It Should Be
2. Come Back Baby

== Live coverage ==
- The Old Bell Hotel, Derby, UK (8 October 2010)
- The Vaults, Derby, UK (23 September 2010)
- Bar One, Derby, UK (30 July 2010)
- The Friary Hotel, Derby, UK (27 July 2010)
- Town Mill, Mansfield, UK (20 November 2008)
