= State Records =

State Records Ltd.
- Industry: Music
- Genre: Various
- Founded: 1975
- Headquarters: London, England

State Records is a British independent record label, established by Wayne Bickerton, Tony Waddington and John Fruin in 1975. The label released hits by many successful artists including the Rubettes, Mac & Katie Kissoon and Delegation.

In July 2012, State released their back catalogue digitally for the first time; the release included over 100 of the label's singles and over 30 albums and compilations, to coincide with the release State announced their first new single in almost thirty years. "Every Road I Take" by The Life was released on 2 July 2012.

== History ==
Bickerton and Waddington's relationship began in the 1950s: they began supporting ex-Beatles drummer Pete Best, making up the Pete Best Trio and touring around the world as a band, concluding with Bickerton and Waddington living in New York.

Upon returning to Britain, Bickerton became a producer with Decca Records and Waddington joined Decca Records' publishing company - Burlington Music. Shortly afterwards the two were signed to Burlington Music as a songwriting duo. Their first gold disc came with the release of Tom Jones' "Can't Stop Loving You".

In 1973, Bickerton and Waddington penned the song "Sugar Baby Love" and recorded it with some session musicians, releasing the record under the name the Rubettes, it quickly became a number one hit. Other Rubettes hits followed, plus chart success for Mac & Katie Kissoon.

The label continued to enjoy success throughout the 1970s and early 1980s until 1983, when the label released their last single, "You Don't Care About I" by Elite. In total, State released over 100 singles and over 20 albums between 1975 and 1983.

State found success in the United States, most notably with the 1978 release "Oh Honey" by Delegation, which peaked at number 6 on the US Billboard R&B chart. The song has been sampled countless times by artists such as Mariah Carey ("Boy (I Need You)"), Dizzee Rascal ("Chillin' wiv da Mandem") and Snoop Dogg ("Wonder What It Do").

In December 2025, it was announced that the catalogue of State had been acquired by Cherry Red Records. The acquisition covered the label’s pop, soul and disco releases from the late 1970s and early 1980s, including recordings by artists such as Mac & Katie Kissoon, Gary Benson and Delegation.

== Notable artists ==
- The Rubettes
- Mac & Katie Kissoon
- Delegation
- Gary Benson
- Liverpool F.C. Squad 1977

== UK Top 40 singles ==
Release date	Artist	Title	Peak position
13 January 1975	Mac & Katie Kissoon	"Sugar Candy Kisses"	3
2 March 1975	The Rubettes	"I Can Do It"	7
27 April 1975	Mac & Katie Kissoon	"Don't Do It Baby"	10
15 June 1975	The Rubettes	"Foe-Dee-O-Dee"	15
3 August 1975	Gary Benson	"Don't Throw It All Away"	20
24 August 1975	Mac & Katie Kissoon	"Like A Butterfly"	18
16 November 1975	The Rubettes	"Little Darling"	30
11 April 1976	Laurie Lingo & The Dipsticks	"Convoy GB"	4
24 May 1976	The Rubettes	"You're The Reason Why"	28
19 September 1976	The Rubettes	"Under One Roof"	40
6 February 1977	The Rubettes	"Baby I Know"	10
17 April 1977	Delegation	"Where Is The Love (We Used To Know)"	22
22 May 1977	Liverpool Football Team	"We Can Do It"	15
16 October 1977	Rokotto	"Boogie On Up"	40
