= The Troggs discography =

- Studio albums: 9
- EPs: 3
- Live albums: 5
- Compilation albums: 16
- Singles: 44
- Video albums: 2

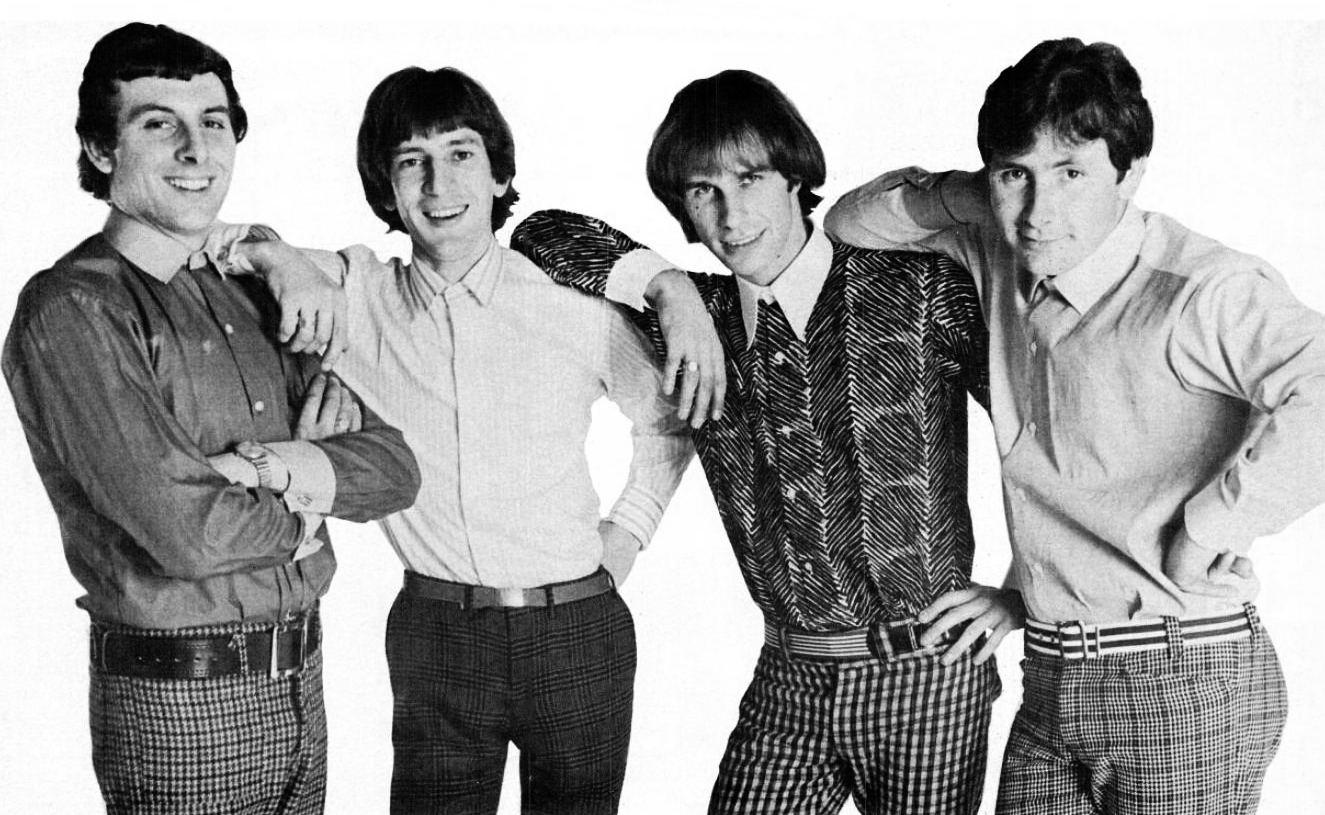

This is the discography of English rock band the Troggs.

== Albums ==
=== Studio albums ===
Title	Album details	Peak chart positions		
Title	Album details	UK	GER	US
From Nowhere	Released: July 1966; Label: Fontana; Formats: LP, 8-track; Released in North America as Wild Thing	6	4	52
Trogglodynamite	Released: 10 February 1967; Label: Page One; Formats: LP	10	15	—
Cellophane	Released: 8 December 1967; Label: Page One; Formats: LP, MC	—	—	—
Mixed Bag	Released: April 1968; Label: Page One, Fontana; Formats: LP, MC, 8-track; Released in North America as Love Is All Around and Hip Hip Hooray in certain European countries	—	—	109
The Troggs	Released: June 1975; Label: Penny Farthing, Pye; Formats: LP, 8-track	—	—	—
The Trogg Tapes	Released: June 1976; Label: Penny Farthing, Private Stock; Formats: LP, MC	—	—	—
Black Bottom	Released: 1981; Label: New Rose; Formats: LP, MC	—	—	—
Au	Released: 1989; Label: New Rose; Formats: CD, LP, MC	—	—	—
Athens Andover	Released: March 1992; Label: Essential!, Rhino; Formats: CD, LP, MC	—	—	—
"—" denotes releases that did not chart or were not released in that territory.

=== Live albums ===
Title	Album details
On Tour	Released: 1968; Label: Page One; Formats: LP
Trogglomania	Released: 1969; Label: Page One; Formats: LP
Live at Max's Kansas City	Released: October 1980; Label: Max's Kansas City; Formats: LP
The Troggs Live	Released: July 2002; Label: Rollercoaster; Formats: CD
Live & Wild	Released: 2008; Label: Time Music International; Formats: CD; Also released as Live & Wild in Preston!

=== Compilation albums ===
Title	Album details	Peak chart positions
Title	Album details	UK
Best of the Troggs	Released: July 1967; Label: Page One; Formats: LP	24
Best of the Troggs – Volume 2	Released: February 1968; Label: Page One; Formats: LP	44
Contrasts	Released: 1970; Label: DJM Silverline; Formats: LP	—
With a Girl Like You	Released: May 1975; Label: DJM Silverline; Formats: LP	—
Best of the Troggs	Released: August 1984; Label: Rhino; Formats: LP, MC	—
Wild Things	Released: August 1989; Label: See for Miles; Formats: CD, LP	—
Hit Single Anthology	Released: April 1991; Label: Fontana; Formats: CD, LP, MC	—
Archeology (1966–1976)	Released: August 1992; Label: Fontana; Formats: 2xCD	—
Greatest Hits	Released: July 1994; Label: PolyGram TV; Formats: CD, MC	27
Wild Thing: The Best of the Troggs	Released: 1995; Label: Dominion Entertainment; Formats: CD	—
The EP Collection	Released: 1996; Label: See for Miles; Formats: CD	—
The Singles A's & B's	Released: November 2004; Label: Repertoire; Formats: 3xCD	—
Greatest Hits	Released: May 2010; Label: Universal Music TV; Formats: CD	—
Wild Thing – The Very Best Of	Released: 12 May 2014; Label: Spectrum Music; Formats: CD, digital download	—
Polythene – Wild on the Radio	Released: 21 April 2018; Label: 1960s/Rhythm & Blues; Formats: LP	—
On Air: The Lost Broadcasts	Released: 3 August 2018; Label: Vogon; Formats: CD	—
"—" denotes releases that did not chart or were not released in that territory.

=== Video albums ===
Title	Album details
The Troggs Collection	Released: 1991; Label: Castle Music Pictures; Formats: VHS
Live and Wild in Preston!	Released: 2003; Label: ABC Entertainment; Formats: DVD

== EPs ==
Title (Note: This is a list of EPs released in the UK. Various other EPs were released elsewhere.)	EP details	Peak chart positions
Title	EP details	UK
Trogg Tops 1	Released: September 1966; Label: Page One; Formats: 7"	8
Trogg Tops 2	Released: July 1967; Label: Page One; Formats: 7"	—
Wild Thing / The Troggs Tapes	Released: January 1984; Label: DJM; Formats: 2x7", 12"	134
"—" denotes releases that did not chart.

== Singles ==
Title (A-side / B-side)	Year	Peak chart positions										UK Album	US Album
Title (A-side / B-side)	Year	UK	AUS	AUT	GER	CAN	IRE	NL	SA	SWE	US	UK Album	US Album
"Lost Girl" b/w "The Yella in Me"	1966	—	—	—	—	—	—	—	—	16	—	Non-album single	Wild Thing
"Wild Thing" b/w "From Home" (UK); "With a Girl Like You" (US)	1966	2	1	5	7	2	5	5	5	9	1	From Nowhere	Wild Thing
"With a Girl Like You" b/w "I Want You"	1966	1	8	6	2	16	2	1	1	2	29	Non-album singles	Wild Thing
"I Can't Control Myself" b/w "Gonna Make You"	1966	2	13	3	2	44	3	5	—	7	43	Non-album singles	Love Is All Around
"Any Way That You Want Me" b/w "66-5-4-3-2-1"	1966	8	76	—	13	—	11	9	6	12	—	Non-album singles	Love Is All Around
"Give It to Me" b/w "You're Lying"	1967	12	20	20	10	—	19	16	4	—	— (Note: "Give It to Me" didn't enter the Billboard Hot 100, but it did peak at number 135 on the Cash Box Singles Chart.)	Non-album singles	Love Is All Around
"My Lady" (Note: "My Girl" was released as a single in the UK, but withdrawn soon after, with "Night of the Long Grass" being issued instead. "My Girl" was also released in Southern Africa.) b/w "Girl in Black"	1967	—	—	—	—	—	—	—	—	—	—	Cellophane	Non-album single
"Night of the Long Grass" b/w "Girl in Black"	1967	17	79	—	23	—	—	—	—	—	—	Non-album single	Love Is All Around
"Hi Hi Hazel" b/w "As I Ride By"	1967	42	81	—	36	—	—	—	—	—	—	From Nowhere	Wild Thing
"Love Is All Around" b/w "When Will the Rain Come"	1967	5	44	—	15	6	17	17	1	12	7	Cellophane	Love Is All Around
"Little Girl" b/w "Maybe the Madman?"	1968	37	56	—	22	—	—	—	15	—	—	Mixed Bag	Love Is All Around
"Surprise, Surprise (I Need You)" b/w "Marbles and Some Gum" (UK); "Cousin Jane" (US)	1968	57 (Note: Chart position is from the official UK "Breakers List".)	—	—	—	—	—	—	—	—	—	Mixed Bag	Non-album singles
"Little Red Donkey" (Note: Only released as a single in Southern Africa.) b/w "Seventeen"	1968	—	—	—	—	—	—	—	2	—	—	Cellophane	Non-album singles
"Too Much of a Good Thing" b/w "Somewhere My Girl Is Waiting"	1968	—	—	—	—	—	—	—	—	—	—	Cellophane	Non-album singles
"You Can Cry If You Want To" (Note: "You Can Cry If You Want To" was set for release as a single in the UK, but remained unreleased there. However, it was released in the majority of other territories.) b/w "There's Something About You"	1968	—	86	—	—	35	—	—	1	—	120	Mixed Bag	Non-album singles
"Hip Hip Hooray" b/w "Say Darlin'!"	1968	—	56	14	18	—	—	—	—	—	—	Mixed Bag	Non-album singles
"Evil Woman" b/w "Sweet Madeleine" (UK); "Heads or Tails" (US)	1969	—	—	—	—	—	—	—	—	—	— (Note: "Evil Woman" didn't enter the Billboard Hot 100, but it did peak at number 129 on the Record World Singles Chart.)	Non-album singles	Non-album singles
"That's What You Get Girl" (Note: "That's Why You Get Girl" was only released as a single in Continental Europe.) b/w "I Don't Know Why"	1969	—	—	—	—	—	—	—	—	—	—	Non-album singles	Non-album singles
"Jingle Jangle" (Note: Only released as a single in Germany.) b/w "No.10 Downing Street"	1969	—	—	—	—	—	—	—	—	—	—	Non-album singles	Non-album singles
"Easy Loving" b/w "Give Me Something"	1970	—	—	—	—	—	—	—	—	—	—	Non-album singles	Non-album singles
"Lover" b/w "Come Now"	1970	—	—	—	—	—	—	—	—	—	—	Non-album singles	Non-album singles
"The Raver" b/w "You"	1970	—	—	—	—	—	—	—	15	—	—	Non-album singles	Non-album singles
"Lazy Weekend" b/w "Let's Pull Together"	1971	—	—	—	—	—	—	—	—	—	—	Non-album singles	Non-album singles
"Little Queenie" (Note: "Little Queenie" was only released as a single in Belgium.) b/w "I Can Only Give You Everything"	1971	—	—	—	—	—	—	—	—	—	—	Non-album singles	Non-album singles
"Everything's Funny" b/w "Feels Like a Woman"	1972	—	—	—	—	—	—	—	— 7	—	—	Non-album singles	Non-album singles
"Listen to the Man" b/w "Queen of Sorrow"	1973	—	—	—	—	—	—	—	—	—	—	Non-album singles	Non-album singles
"Strange Movies" b/w "I'm on Fire"	1973	—	—	—	—	—	—	—	—	—	—	Non-album singles	Non-album singles
"Good Vibrations" b/w "Push It Up to Me"	1975	—	—	—	—	—	—	—	—	—	102	The Troggs	The Troggs
"Summertime" b/w "Jenny Come Down"	1975	—	—	—	—	—	—	—	—	—	— (Note: "Summertime" didn't enter the Billboard Hot 100, but it did peak at number 138 on the Record World Singles Chart.)	The Troggs	The Troggs
"(I Can't Get No) Satisfaction" b/w "Memphis, Tennessee"	1975	—	—	—	—	—	—	—	—	—	—	The Troggs	The Troggs
"I'll Buy You an Island" b/w "Supergirl"	1976	—	—	—	—	—	—	—	—	—	—	Non-album singles	Non-album singles
"Feeling for Love" b/w "Summertime"	1977	—	—	—	—	—	—	—	—	—	—	Non-album singles	Non-album singles
"Just a Little Too Much" b/w "The True Troggs Tapes?"	1978	—	—	—	—	—	—	—	—	—	—	Non-album singles	Non-album singles
"Coz We're Dancing" b/w "Fast Train"	1980	—	—	—	—	—	—	—	—	—	—	Non-album singles	Non-album singles
"Black Bottom" b/w "With You"	1982	—	—	—	—	—	—	—	—	—	—	Black Bottom	Non-album singles
"I Love You, Baby" (Note: "I Love You, Baby" was only released as a single in France.) b/w "Black Bottom"	1982	—	—	—	—	—	—	—	—	—	—	Black Bottom	Non-album singles
"Every Little Thing" b/w "Blackjack and Poker"	1984	—	—	—	—	—	—	—	—	—	—	Non-album singles	Non-album singles
"Wild Thing '89" b/w "Ghost Train" (by 2B Productions)	1989	—	—	—	—	—	—	—	—	—	—	Non-album singles	Non-album singles
"Wild Thing" (reissue) b/w "From Home"	1991	87	—	—	—	—	—	—	—	—	—	Non-album singles	Non-album singles
"Don't You Know" b/w "Nowhere Road"	1992	—	—	—	—	—	—	—	—	—	—	Athens Andover	Athens Andover
"Together" b/w "Crazy Annie"	1992	—	—	—	—	—	—	—	—	—	—	Athens Andover	Athens Andover
"Wild Thing" (with Oliver Reed and Alex "Hurricane" Higgins) b/w "Wild Thing" (Tinchen GP Mix)	1992	—	—	—	—	—	—	—	—	—	—	Non-album single	Non-album singles
"War" (by Edwin Starr featuring Shadow) b/w "Wild Thing" (by the Troggs featuring Wolf)	1993	69	—	—	—	—	—	—	—	—	—	The Return of the Gladiators (by various artists)	Non-album singles
"Let's Drink a Toast" b/w "What You Doin' Here"/"Disco Kid"	1998	—	—	—	—	—	—	—	—	—	—	Non-album single	Non-album singles
"—" denotes releases that did not chart or were not released in that territory.
