= Trogglodynamite =

Studio album by The Troggs
- Released: 10 February 1967
- Recorded: 1966
- Genre: Garage rock; psychedelic rock
- Length: 36:45
- Language: English
- Label: Page One
- Producer: Larry Page

The Troggs chronology
From Nowhere (1966)	Trogglodynamite (1967)	Cellophane (1967)

Trogglodynamite is the second studio album by the English rock band The Troggs, released in 1967 (picture shows the German edition, the UK version had a completely different cover). Trogglodynamite reached number ten on the Record Retailer Albums Chart.

== Production ==
Due to the hectic touring schedule the Troggs had, according to manager Larry Page it was essential for the band to record album tracks whenever they had spare time to do so. Trogglodynamite was initially intended to have been issued in the second week of December 1966, in conjunction with their single "Any Way That You Want Me". Page had arranged for the Troggs to record in Germany during a tour there, the band were prohibited from doing so by the Musicians' Union. At that point, the LP only been 25% completed, with a deadline of Christmas. As the Troggs wished to experiment in the studio, the remaining tracks were recorded in four different recording studios as most studio time elsewhere had already been booked. Trogglodynamite was as such delayed until January 1967. Studio sessions in January were further postponed after Presley was hospitalized for troubles with his throat and vocal cords.

== Release and reception ==
Professional ratings
Review scores
Source	Rating
Allmusic -	2/5 stars

Trogglodynamite was eventually released on 10 February 1967 together with the non-album single "Give It to Me". The album was re-released in 2003 with eight bonus tracks by Repertoire Records.

In Colin Larkin's The Encyclopedia of Popular Music, he scores this release four out of five stars.

== Track listing ==
=== "Trogglodynamite" UK original track listing ===
==== Side 1 ====
1. "I Can Only Give You Everything" (Tommy Scott, Phil Coulter) – 3:24
2. "Last Summer" (Reg Presley) – 2:55
3. "Meet Jacqueline" (Albert Hammond) – 2:14
4. "Oh No" (Pete Staples) – 2:05
5. "It's Too Late" (Ronnie Bond) – 2:08
6. "No. 10 Downing Street" (Larry Page, David Matthews) – 2:15
7. "Mona (I Need You Baby)" (Bo Diddley) – 5:09

==== Side 2 ====
8. "I Want You to Come into My Life" (Reg Presley) – 2:25
9. "Let Me Tell You Babe" (Joe Sherman, George David Weiss) – 2:49
10. "Little Queenie" (Chuck Berry) – 2:51
11. "Cousin Jane" (Larry Page, David Matthews) – 2:25
12. "You Can't Beat It" (Reg Presley) – 2:21
13. "Baby Come Closer" (Terry Dwyer, Jack Price) – 2:33
14. "It's Over" (Reg Presley) – 2:11

==== 2003 CD re-issue bonus tracks ====
15. "Any Way That You Want Me" (Chip Taylor) – 2:54
16. "66-5-4-3-2-1 (I Know What You Want)" (Reg Presley) – 2:33
17. "Give It to Me" (Reg Presley) – 2:13
18. "You're Lying" (Larry Page, Colin Frechter) – 2:21
19. "Night of the Long Grass" (Reg Presley) – 3:04
20. "Girl in Black" (Colin Frechter) – 2:01
21. "Evil Woman" (George David Weiss) – 2:53
22. "Sweet Madelaine" (Reg Presley) – 2:50

== Personnel ==
- Ronnie Bond – drums, lead vocals on "It's Too Late"
- Chris Britton – guitar, backing vocals
- Reg Presley – lead vocals
- Pete Staples – bass, backing vocals

== Charts ==
Weekly chart performance for Trogglodynamite
Chart (1967)	Peak position
UK Disc and Music Echo Top Ten LPs	7
UK Melody Maker Top Ten LPs	7
UK New Musical Express Britain's Top 15 LPs	7
UK Record Retailer LPs Chart	10
West German Media Control Albums Chart	15
