= From Nowhere =

Studio album by the Troggs
- Released: 22 July 1966
- Recorded: February – May 1966
- Studio: Olympic Sound, London
- Genre: Garage rock; R&B
- Length: 30:33
- Label: Fontana
- Producer: Larry Page

The Troggs chronology
From Nowhere (1966)	Trogglodynamite (1967)

Singles from From Nowhere
- 1. "Wild Thing" Released: 22 April 1966

From Nowhere is the debut album by the English band the Troggs, released in 1966. It was released with an alternative track listing as Wild Thing in the United States. The album reached number six on the UK Record Retailer Albums Chart and number 52 on the US Billboard Top LP's chart.

== Background and production ==
From Nowhere was preceded by the release of "Wild Thing" on 22 April 1966, with "From Home" on the B-side.

According to drummer Ronnie Bond, Reg Presley was writing songs aimed for the album whilst recording it in the studio; this practice irritated manager Larry Page, who repeatedly quipped "'Reg, have you finished it yet?" With the exception of "Wild Thing", which had been recorded in February 1966, From Nowhere was recorded in "just three and a half hours brief" at Olympic Sound Studios in London. The sessions were held in late May, with sessions on the 30th and 31st. Of the recording process, Pete Staples commented that certain tracks ("With a Girl Like You") took half an hour to record, though others "took as long as two hours" to be taped. The hastiness was a result of the band having rehearsed the songs before recording them. As with the rest of their 1966–67 output, the album was produced by Page for his Page One production company. The photo on the sleeve was taken at Cheddar Caves, Somerset, on 22 May 1966.

== Music ==
They [the Troggs] have experimented with other sounds. The whistling sound on the record ["Wild Thing"] was obtained by the introduction of an ocarina, which is the cross between a whistle and a flute. "We're always on the lookout for different instruments, no matter how strange they may seem", he [Reg Presley] continued.

— Reg Presley and Kirwan Barry (1966)

Lead vocalist Reg Presley wrote five of the tracks on From Nowhere, with the rest of the album being composed of cover songs. According to journalist Chris Welch, The Troggs fondness for R&B is reflected in the selection of the covers. Annie Black of Paste Magazine described the style: "No two songs on this album are alike. 'The Kitty Cat Song' is a tongue-in-cheek, cautionary metaphor, and 'I Just Sing' serves up a jungle beat matched by a tinkly organ, while 'Hi Hi Hazel' is borderline psychedelic."

From Nowhere differs substantially in the track listing of its US counterpart Wild Thing, with eight of the 12 tracks remaining the same. For the US release, the four cover songs "The Kitty Cat Song", "Ride Your Pony", "Louie Louie", and "Jaguar and Thunderbird" were removed. These were instead replaced by four other songs: "Lost Girl", which had been released as the Troggs British debut single in February 1966, "With a Girl Like You", which had been a top-30 hit single in both the UK and the US, "I Want You", the B-side of "With a Girl Like You" in the UK, and "Your Love", which had been composed by Page together with Michael Julien.

== Release and reception ==
From Nowhere was rush-released in the UK on 22 July 1966 to tie in with the group's sudden popularity. The album was re-released in 2003 with an altered track list and five bonus tracks by Repertoire Records.

Writing for Record Mirror, Peter Jones found the album to have a "powerful dance beat" throughout. Jones criticizes both Presley's vocal performance as "nasal" and "harsh", and puts additional critique towards the instrumental backing, which he finds thin. Despite this, he felt that the musical variety on the album makes up for these blunders, and noted Lee Dorsey's influence on it. He ended his review by stating the album to be a "ponderous and powerful LP" and a "very good debut album". Although Penny Valentine of Disc and Music Echo felt the album was good, she believed Presley's tracks to be superior to the covers. Valentine felt that material such as "Ride Your Pony" and "Louie Louie" had "been done and done" and were still a "bore" despite arrangements. Nonetheless, she praises Presley's vocal performance as "funny, precise hip-swinging" and singles out "Our Love Will Still Be There" as her favorite track, before closing by stating that From Nowhere is an interesting LP, "although perhaps not quite as shattering as" she would have hoped.

Annie Black of Paste Magazine said: "You’ve sung along emphatically to 'Wild Thing' at least once in your life, right? Of course you have. We can give many thanks to The Troggs for that. [...] You can’t help yourself from toe-tapping throughout a full listen. No two songs on this album are alike. [...] Despite the disparities, From Nowhere flows with miraculous ease, making it simple to see why The Troggs influenced so many great artists, including Ramones." In Colin Larkin's The Encyclopedia of Popular Music, he scores this release four out of five stars. Randall Roberts of the Los Angeles Times described the album as an "underappreciated gem".

== Track listing ==
=== Original UK release ===
All tracks written by Reg Presley, unless otherwise noted. Track lengths adapted from the 2003 re-issue of From Nowhere.

Side one

1. "Wild Thing" (Chip Taylor) – 2:34
2. "The Kitty Cat Song" (Jimmy Roach, Joe Spendel) – 2:11
3. "Ride Your Pony" (Naomi Neville) – 2:24
4. "Hi Hi Hazel" (Bill Martin, Phil Coulter) – 2:43
5. "I Just Sing" – 2:09
6. "Evil" (Shelby Singleton Jr.) – 3:13

Side two

1. "Our Love Will Still Be There" – 3:08
2. "Louie Louie" (Richard Berry) – 3:01
3. "Jingle Jangle" – 2:26
4. "When I'm with You" – 2:23
5. "From Home" – 2:20
6. "Jaguar and Thunderbird" (Chuck Berry) – 2:01

=== Original US release ===
All tracks written by Reg Presley, unless otherwise noted. Track lengths adapted from the 2003 re-issue of From Nowhere.

Side one

1. "Wild Thing" (Chip Taylor) – 2:34
2. "From Home" – 2:20
3. "I Just Sing" – 2:09
4. "Hi Hi Hazel" (Bill Martin, Phil Coulter) – 2:43
5. "Lost Girl" – 2:31
6. "Evil" (Shelby Singleton Jr.) – 3:12

Side two

1. "With a Girl Like You" – 2:05
2. "Our Love Will Still Be There" – 3:08
3. "Jingle Jangle" – 2:26
4. "When I'm With You" – 2:23
5. "Your Love" (Larry Page, Michael Julien) – 1:52
6. "I Want You" (Larry Page, Colin Frechter) – 2:13

== Personnel ==
Personnel according to the 2003 re-issue of From Nowhere, unless noted.

The Troggs

- Reg Presley – lead vocals (all except "Ride Your Pony" and "Jaguar and Thunderbird"), ocarina ("Wild Thing"), melodica ("Hi Hi Hazel")
- Chris Britton – guitar, lead vocals ("Ride Your Pony")
- Pete Staples – bass
- Ronnie Bond – drums, lead vocals ("Jaguar and Thunderbird")

Other personnel

- Larry Page – producer
- Colin Fretcher – ocarina ("Wild Thing")
- Unknown – harpsichord ("I Just Sing" and "Jingle Jangle"), piano ("When I'm With You")

== Charts ==
Weekly chart performance for From Nowhere / Wild Thing
Chart (1966–67)	Peak position
UK Disc and Music Echo Top Ten LPs	5
UK Melody Maker Top Ten LPs	4
UK New Musical Express Best Selling LPs in Britain	5
UK Record Retailer LPs Chart	6
US Billboard Top LP's	52
US Cash Box Top 100 Albums	30
US Record World Top 100 LP's	37
West German Media Control Albums Chart	4
