= Lost Girl (song) =

1966 single by the Troggs

- Swedish picture sleeve

Single by the Troggs
- B-side: "The Yella in Me"
- Released: 11 February 1966
- Recorded: 1 February 1966
- Studio: Regent Sound, London
- Genre: Proto-punk
- Length: 2:30
- Label: CBS
- Songwriter: Reg Presley
- Producer: Larry Page

The Troggs singles chronology
"Lost Girl" (1966)	"Wild Thing" (1966)

Audio
- "Lost Girl" on YouTube

"Lost Girl" is a song by the English rock band the Troggs, written by their lead singer Reginald Ball. The song was part of a demo that impressed manager Larry Page, which resulted in him signing the Troggs on the same day he recorded it at the Regent Sound studio on Denmark Street. Musically, "Lost Girl" is a proto-punk song characteristically similar to other tracks by the Troggs, putting emphasis on Ronnie Bond's "pseudo-African" galloping drum beat and Chris Britton's fuzz guitar.

Issued as the group's debut single in February 1966 on CBS Records, backed by "The Yella in Me", "Lost Girl" was a commercial failure upon initial release and failed to chart in the UK. It prompted Ball to adapt the stage name Reg Presley. After the Troggs had achieved hits with "Wild Thing" and "With a Girl Like You", CBS re-released "Lost Girl" to cash in on their success, and this reissue reached the top-ten in Sweden and was also included on their American debut album Wild Thing. It received mixed reviews, with praise for the song's beat but criticism for its apparent unoriginality.

== Background and composition ==
The Troggs had formed by the members of two Andover, Hampshire bands – Ten Feet Five and the Troglodytes – and the new quartet, consisting of vocalist Reginald Maurice Ball, guitarist Chris Britton, bass guitarist Pete Staples and drummer Ronnie Bond played their first gig together on 26 December 1965. Cutting a demo, consisting of a Rolling Stones song, the Kinks' "You Really Got Me" and two original compositions by Ball, "Lost Girl" and "The Yella in Me", the band sent it to the Kinks' manager Larry Page. Having previously rejected the Troglodytes and told them to "come back in exactly a year", Page was impressed by the strength of the demo and both signed the Troggs to a probationary management contract and scheduled them for a recording session "down the street" from his Denmark Street office at the Regent Sound studios on 1 February 1966. (Note: Writer Gordon Thompson asserts that Larry Page's relationship with the Kinks had "dissolved into lawsuits" and that he tried to re-establish his reputation when he signed the Troggs.) As with all of their 1966 recordings, it was produced by Page for his production company Page One Productions.

Page agreed to record "Lost Girl" and "The Yella in Me" as the band's debut single, finding the latter song particularly strong. According to Alec Palao, "Lost Girl" reflects the Troggs' "musical primitivism" owing to the drum backbeat and the "thundering jungle" bass. Similarly Pete Kerr of the Fife Free Press comments on the rhythm, noting it to be "galloping". Similarly, Troggs biographer Ken Barnes inferes that Bond's drum performance contains a "pseudo-African" beat which suggested a musical sophistication that "never seemed to come". On the track, Britton performs fuzz guitar with a "ripping work", with Barnes further adding that the performance was some of Britton's "wildest guitar work". Palao believes that Ball's vocal performance on the track was charismatic, and Kerr also believed that part of it is semi-spoken. Writing for Ugly Things, Jon Savage opines that "Lost Girl" was a "maxxed out monster" in the year of "the bad attitude", which acted as a precursor to the punk rock of the 1970s.

== Release ==
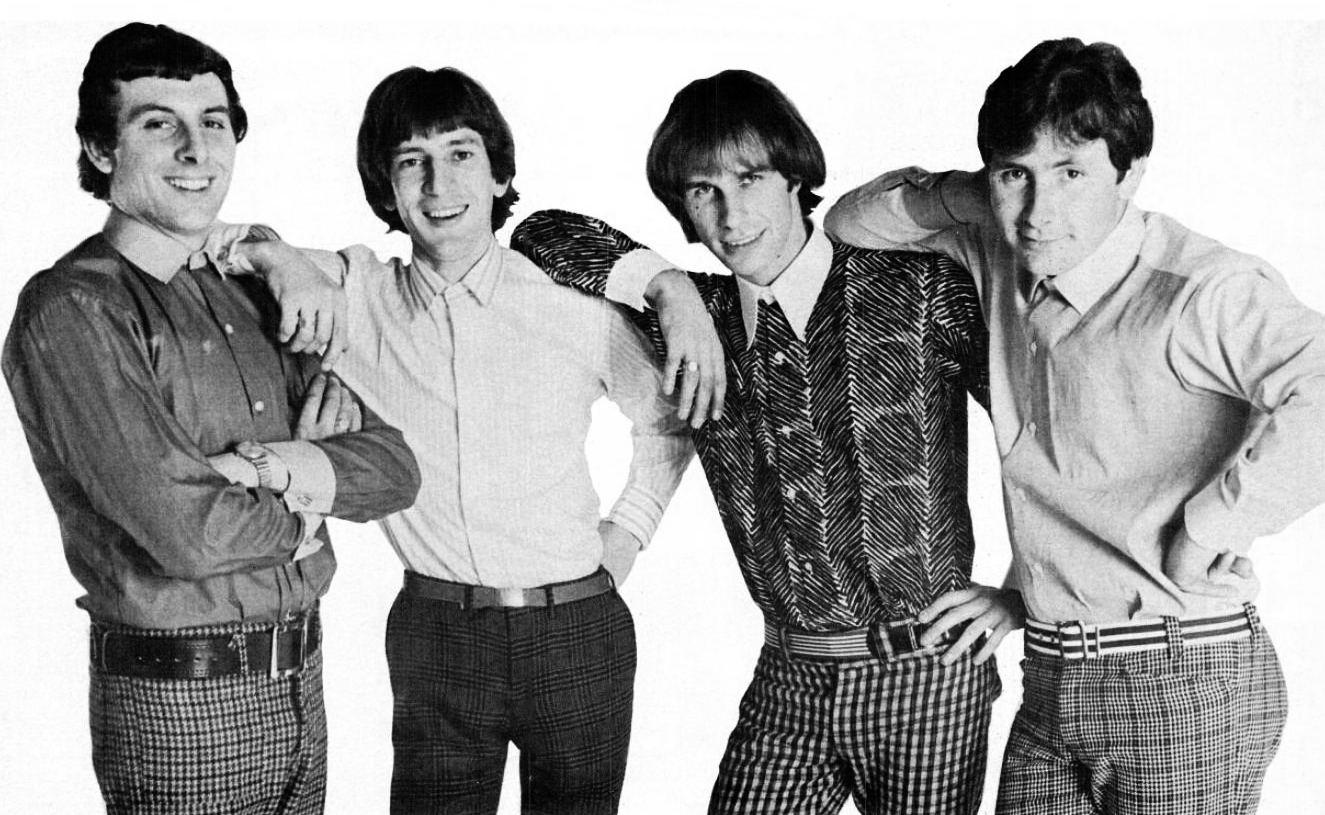
The Troggs in 1966

Though the Troggs signed to Page's production company, "Lost Girl" was leased to CBS Records. The single was released on 11 February 1966 as the band's debut single with "The Yella in Me" on the B-side. (Note: Catalogue number CBS 202038.) Upon original release, the single garnered attention in the Netherlands, where fans enjoyed the song's "uptempo rhythm". In the UK however, the song was a commercial failure and failed to chart, which, in the words of Keith Altham of the New Musical Express was due to the lack of airplay. According to Ball, the single received a single airing on Radio Luxembourg "at 3 AM", which he missed as he fell asleep five minutes earlier. Retrospectively explained by Ball, he became "miserable" after "Lost Girl" failed to reach the charts.

Despite being a chart failure, the band received media attention after the release of "Lost Girl", and Altham suggested that Ball change his stage name to something "more glamorous"; inspired by Elvis Presley, he adapted the name Reg Presley. In September 1966, after the Troggs had scored two UK top-ten singles with "Wild Thing" and "With a Girl Like You", CBS re-issued "Lost Girl" just prior to the release of their fourth single, "I Can't Control Myself". This release was not authorized by the band. The re-issue nonetheless became a hit in Sweden, where it peaked at number seven on Tio i Topp during a four-week run in December 1966, and additionally reached number 16 on Kvällstoppen. "Lost Girl" was not included on the group's UK debut album From Nowhere, but was released on the US equivalent Wild Thing.

== Reception and legacy ==
The single received mixed reviews upon release. Writing for New Musical Express, critic Derek Johnson believed the lyrics contrasted against the "fervent, frantic beat", noting that the song had an "explosive, underlying rumble". He ended by stating it to be "quite a raver". Norman Jopling and Peter Jones of Record Mirror found the song to be a lively "drum-dominated beat ballad", though only noting it to be "okay" and "not too different". Pete James of the Eastbourne Gazette found "Lost Girl" to "sound very much" like the Kinks, which was "not surprising" given that the bands shared managers. On the contrary, Michael Joliffe of the South Yorkshire Times believed that an "insistent beat" pervaded throughout the number with a "hypnotic determination" which he deemed to be good.

Contrasting it to the Troggs' prior hits "Wild Thing" and "With a Girl Like You", David Surrey of the Newcastle Journal expressed perplexity on how "Lost Girl" had been a chart failure, as he believed it to be "full of the typical Trogg character" with most "trademarks of their style". He believed it stood up on its own against the Troggs' contemporary single "I Can't Control Myself". On the contrary, the reviewer for the Mowbray Times believed "Lost Girl" lacked the gimmicks of their subsequent hits that had become "landmarks", as did Portadown News, who found the song to be "even worse" than "I Can't Control Myself". According to music critic Richie Unterberger of AllMusic, the inclusion of "Lost Girl" on the Wild Thing album made it the superior choice to From Nowhere. Britton admitted the Troggs liked the rhythm of "Lost Girl", to the point it was re-used for the song "From Home", which was the B-side of "Wild Thing". "From Home" was characterized as a "virtual clone of 'Lost Girl'" according to Barnes.

== Personnel ==
Personnel according to the liner notes of Nuggets II: Original Artyfacts from the British Empire and Beyond, 1964–1969.

The Troggs

- Reg Presley – lead vocals
- Chris Britton – guitar
- Pete Staples – bass guitar
- Ronnie Bond – drums

Production

- Larry Page – producer

== Charts ==
Weekly chart performance for "Lost Girl"
Chart (1966)	Peak position
Sweden (Kvällstoppen)	16
Sweden (Tio i Topp)	7
