= Love Is All Around =

1967 single by the Troggs

- Norwegian picture sleeve

Single by the Troggs

from the album Cellophane
- B-side: "When Will the Rain Come"
- Released: 13 October 1967
- Studio: Pye, London
- Genre: Baroque pop; soft rock
- Length: 2:59
- Label: Page One; Fontana
- Songwriter: Reg Presley
- Producer: Larry Page

The Troggs singles chronology
"Hi Hi Hazel" (1967)	"Love Is All Around" (1967)	"Little Girl" (1968)

"Love Is All Around" is a song recorded by English rock band the Troggs. Released as a single in October 1967, it was a top-ten hit in both the UK and US.

"Love Is All Around" has been covered by numerous artists, including R.E.M., with whom the Troggs subsequently recorded their 1992 comeback album Athens Andover. R.E.M.'s cover was a B-side on their 1991 "Radio Song" single, and they also played it during their first appearance at MTV's Unplugged series that same year. Wet Wet Wet's cover, for the soundtrack to the 1994 film Four Weddings and a Funeral, was an international hit and spent 15 consecutive weeks at number one on the UK Singles Chart.

== Writing and original recording ==
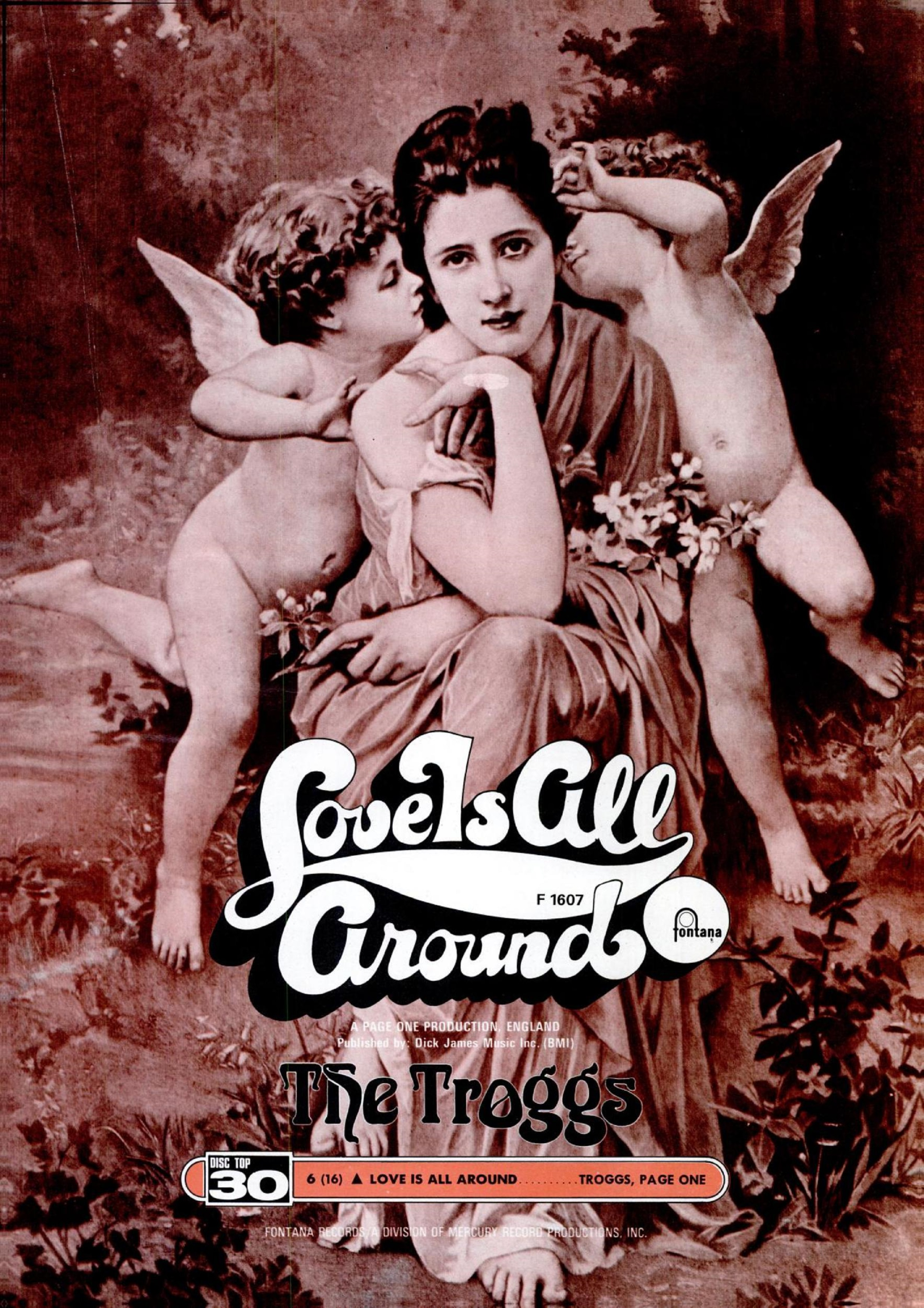
Billboard advertisement, 9 December 1967

Reg Presley, lead singer of the Troggs, wrote "Love Is All Around" in about ten minutes, inspired by a TV broadcast of the Salvation Army band Joystrings performing an evangelical song titled "Love That's All Around". The Troggs recorded Presley's song at Pye Studios for the record label Page One owned by their manager Larry Page, who also produced the recording. The single was released in the UK in October 1967. The Troggs had intended to sever ties with Page and his record label earlier that year; however, after the success of the single they decided to stay, though changed managers. The single was released in the rest of Europe and North America on Fontana Records. The B-side, "When Will the Rain Come" was written by drummer Ronnie Bond.

On the UK Record Retailer chart (since recognised as the official chart for this period), "Love Is All Around" spent a total of 14 weeks on the chart, reaching its peak at number 5 in the fourth week of November 1967. Whilst, in the US, although it was released there in November 1967, the song did not enter the Billboard Hot 100 until February 1968. It spent a total of 16 weeks on the chart, reaching its peak at number 7 in the third week of May. "Love Is All Around" also performed well in Europe, becoming a top-20 hit in several countries, though it failed to recapture the success of the Troggs' early singles such as "Wild Thing" and "With a Girl Like You". However, the song performed best in Southern Africa, where it topped the charts in South Africa and Rhodesia.

== Critical reception ==
Reviewing for New Musical Express, Derek Johnson wrote that "Love Is All Around" is "set to a fairly slow rhythm, with an appealing scoring of guitars, violins and cellos – plus a melody that takes a little time to register, but once you've got it in your mind, it sticks there! Reg sings warmly and sincerely – departing from that rather stilted style which has characterised many of the group's discs". Peter Jones for Record Mirror described it as "optimistic and cheery and full of sentiment. Like the way the string section is insinuating itself as it builds. Rather a serene slice of Troggs". For Disc and Music Echo, Penny Valentine wrote that "although this has none of their trademark of suggestive hip-thumping rhythm and Reg Presley making love to the mike, it is quite pleasant. At the beginning, I liked it very much with its closed-up gentle sound and pretty strings. It would have been nice if something had happened, but it just went on, which I somehow think will be its downfall".

Billboard wrote that "this smooth, easy beat ballad with good lyric line should be just the commercial entry to put the British group back in their top selling bag in the U.S.". Cash Box described it as a "steady-moving, romance-slanted soft rocker... [that] could make noise".

== Charts ==
=== Weekly charts ===
Weekly chart performance for the Troggs version
Chart (1967–1968)	Peak position
Australia (Go-Set)	37
Australia (Kent Music Report)	44
Canada Top Singles (RPM)	6
Ireland (IRMA)	17
Netherlands (Dutch Top 40)	19
Netherlands (Single Top 100)	17
New Zealand (Listener)	3
Rhodesia (Lyons Maid)	1
South Africa (Springbok Radio)	1
Sweden (Kvällstoppen)	12
Sweden (Tio i Topp)	4
UK Melody Maker Top 30	4
UK New Musical Express Top 30	4
UK Record Retailer Top 50	5
US Billboard Hot 100	7
US Cash Box Top 100	12
US Record World 100 Top Pops	10
West Germany (GfK)	15

=== Year-end charts ===
1968 year-end chart performance for the Troggs version
Chart (1968)	Rank
Canada Top Singles (RPM)	52
South Africa (Springbok Radio)	16
US Billboard Hot 100	40
US Cash Box Top 100	56
US (Joel Whitburn's Pop Annual)	75

== Wet Wet Wet version ==
"Love Is All Around"

Single by Wet Wet Wet

from the album Four Weddings and a Funeral and Picture This
- Released: 9 May 1994
- Studio: The Brill Building (Glasgow, Scotland)
- Genre: Rock; pop
- Length: 3:59
- Label: The Precious Organisation
- Songwriter: Reg Presley
- Producer: Wet Wet Wet

Wet Wet Wet singles chronology
"Cold Cold Heart" (1993)	"Love Is All Around" (1994)	"Julia Says" (1995)

Music video
- "Love Is All Around" on YouTube

Richard Curtis approached Scottish band Wet Wet Wet about recording a cover song to soundtrack his 1994 film Four Weddings and a Funeral. The band got to choose between three songs, the other two being "I Will Survive" by Gloria Gaynor and "Can't Smile Without You" by Barry Manilow. Singer Marti Pellow related that the decision to pick "Love Is All Around" was an easy choice "because we knew we could make it our own". The song, which has a different introduction from the Troggs' version, was released on 9 May 1994 by The Precious Organisation. Its accompanying music video was directed by Marcus Nispel and filmed in New York City. "Love Is All Around" was nominated in the category for Best Single at the 1995 Smash Hits Awards.

Reg Presley famously spent some of his songwriting royalties on crop circle research. In 2004, Pellow said, "I still think it's a brilliant record. Its strength is its sheer simplicity. Any band would give their eye teeth to have a hit record like that. I'm very proud of it." Pellow also recorded his own version of the song for inclusion on his 2002 album Marti Pellow Sings the Hits of Wet Wet Wet & Smile.

=== Critical reception ===
Larry Flick of Billboard magazine wrote, "Grinding rock ballad is etched with crunchy chords and vocals that conjure up memories of various old '60s pop favorites. Pledge-of-love lyrics will tug at the emotions of susceptible teen-age girls, as well as folks who want to relive fond moments from the notable Andie MacDowell film." Steve Baltin for Cash Box felt the Scottish quartet "have a charm about their music that makes it easy to see why they were chosen for the soundtrack of the surprise hit film. Supposedly they're through conquering the rest of the world and now plan on concentrating on America. With this song, they're on their way."

In his weekly UK chart commentary, James Masterton said, "Just when you thought all was lost, along comes a record to restore your faith in pop music." Chris Roberts for Melody Maker wrote, "Magnificent. Gorgeous. Sumptuous. All the more so because NOBODY agrees with me about the very splendid Wets and the indescribably astute vocalising of the horribly smug Marti Pellow." Pan-European magazine Music & Media deemed it a "sugary ballad", adding, "Let's see if Marti Pellow can shake his hips like Reg Presley!"

=== Chart performance ===
On 15 May 1994, "Love Is All Around" entered the UK Singles Chart at number four. After climbing to number two the following week, it reached number one on 29 May. It remained there for 15 weeks, becoming—as of 2026—the second-longest UK chart reign for a British act of all time. "Love Is All Around" spent a further 20 weeks in the UK top 75. Throughout its chart run, some radio stations banned the song, as many listeners were irritated by hearing it for so long. The band themselves eventually took the decision to delete the record from sale, allowing "Saturday Night" by Whigfield to debut at number one on 11 September 1994, with Wet Wet Wet dropping to number two. "Love Is All Around" has sold 1.91 million copies in the United Kingdom, making it the country's current best-selling love ballad as of 2021 (including download and physical sales only).

=== Music video ===
A music video was produced to accompany the song, which included projected footage from the film, and was directed by German director Marcus Nispel. It was filmed in New York City, and Jim Fealy directed photography on the Warner Bros. shoot. Ethan Wolvek was supervising producer and Anouk F. Nora executive producer.

=== Track listings ===
- UK CD1
1. "Love Is All Around"
2. "I Can Give You Everything" (7-inch Arthur Baker soul remix)
3. "Ain't No Stoppin'/Le Freak"
- UK CD2
1. "Love Is All Around"
2. "Is This Love" (live)
3. "Love Is All Around" (TV mix)
4. "I Can Give You Everything" (12-inch house mix)
- UK 7-inch and cassette single
1. "Love Is All Around"
2. "I Can Give You Everything" (7-inch Arthur Baker soul remix)
- US CD single
1. "Love Is All Around" – 3:59
2. "Cold Cold Heart" – 4:13
- US 7-inch single

A. "Love Is All Around" – 3:59
B. "Goodnight Girl" – 3:38

=== Credits and personnel ===
Credits are lifted from the UK CD1 liner notes and the Picture This album booklet.

Studio

- Recorded at The Brill Building (Glasgow, Scotland)

Personnel

- Wet Wet Wet – production, arrangement
  - Graeme Clark – fretless bass, assorted basses, production
  - Tommy Cunningham – drums, percussion
  - Neil Mitchell – keyboards, piano
  - Marti Pellow – vocals
- Reg Presley – writing
- Graeme Duffin – all guitars, co-production
- Bob Clearmountain – mixing
- Ian Morrow – programming
- Simon Vinestock – engineering
- Andrew Boland – string engineering

=== Charts ===
==== Weekly charts ====
Weekly chart performance for Wet Wet Wet's cover
Chart (1994)	Peak position
Australia (ARIA)	1
Austria (Ö3 Austria Top 40)	1
Belgium (Ultratop 50 Flanders)	1
Canada Retail Singles (The Record)	3
Canada Top Singles (RPM)	17
Canada Adult Contemporary (RPM)	9
Denmark (IFPI)	1
Europe (Eurochart Hot 100)	1
Europe (European AC Radio)	1
Europe (European Hit Radio)	1
Finland (Suomen virallinen lista)	1
France (SNEP)	2
Germany (GfK)	2
Iceland (Íslenski Listinn Topp 40)	1
Ireland (IRMA)	2
Israel (Israeli Singles Chart)	23
Netherlands (Dutch Top 40)	1
Netherlands (Single Top 100)	1
New Zealand (Recorded Music NZ)	1
Norway (VG-lista)	1
Scottish Singles Sales (Official Charts)	1
Spain (AFYVE)	5
Sweden (Sverigetopplistan)	1
Switzerland (Schweizer Hitparade)	2
UK Singles (Official Charts)	1
UK Airplay (Music Week)	1
US Billboard Hot 100	41
US Adult Contemporary (Billboard)	8
Zimbabwe (ZIMA)	5

==== Year-end charts ====
Year-end chart performance for Wet Wet Wet's cover
Chart (1994)	Position
Australia (ARIA)	1
Austria (Ö3 Austria Top 40)	2
Belgium (Ultratop)	1
Brazil (Crowley)	95
Canada Adult Contemporary (RPM)	73
Europe (Eurochart Hot 100)	1
Europe (European Hit Radio)	1
France (SNEP)	14
Germany (Media Control)	7
Iceland (Íslenski Listinn Topp 40)	1
Netherlands (Dutch Top 40)	5
Netherlands (Single Top 100)	5
New Zealand (RIANZ)	1
Sweden (Topplistan)	3
Switzerland (Schweizer Hitparade)	5
UK Singles (OCC)	1
UK Airplay (Music Week)	1
US Adult Contemporary (Billboard)	26

==== Decade-end charts ====
Decade-end chart performance for Wet Wet Wet's cover
Chart (1990–1999)	Position
Austria (Ö3 Austria Top 40)	19
Belgium (Ultratop 50 Flanders)	3
Netherlands (Dutch Top 40)	46

=== Certifications ===
Certifications and sales for Wet Wet Wet's cover
Region	Certification	Certified units/sales
Australia (ARIA)	3× Platinum	210,000^{^}
Austria (IFPI Austria)	Platinum	50,000^{*}
Denmark (IFPI Danmark)	Gold	45,000^{‡}
Germany (BVMI)	Platinum	500,000^{^}
Netherlands (NVPI)	Gold	50,000^{^}
New Zealand (RMNZ)	Platinum	10,000^{*}
Spain (Promusicae)	Gold	30,000^{‡}
Sweden (GLF)	Platinum	50,000^{^}
United Kingdom (BPI)	3× Platinum	1,900,000
^{*} Sales figures based on certification alone.^{^} Shipments figures based on certification alone.^{‡} Sales+streaming figures based on certification alone.

=== Release history ===
Release dates and formats for Wet Wet Wet's cover
Region	Date	Format(s)	Label(s)	Ref.
United Kingdom	9 May 1994	7-inch vinyl; CD; cassette	The Precious Organisation	
United States	7 June 1994	7-inch vinyl; CD; cassette	London	
Japan	24 September 1994	CD	The Precious Organisation	

== Other cover versions and film uses ==
Prior to achieving international success with their single "These Eyes", "Love Is All Around" was covered by The Guess Who around 1967/68, and is available on compilation album This Time Long Ago. The song was also covered by Lotta Engbergs orkester as "Du ger mig av din kärlek" with Swedish lyrics written by Peter Stedt in 1994 while the Spanish rendering "El Amor Me Envuelve (Sabes Que Te Amo)" was recorded by Rocío Banquells for her 1999 album Fuerza Del Amor.

The song appeared in Get Real (1998) directed by Simon Shore, screenplay by Patrick Wilde. After its use in Four Weddings and a Funeral, the song appeared in several of Richard Curtis' other projects, including the 2003 film Love Actually (reinvented as the Christmas song "Christmas Is All Around" performed by actor Bill Nighy as fictional rock star Billy Mack), and an episode of hit sitcom The Vicar of Dibley where it is performed by a church choir. It also played in a season two episode of Orphan Black and included on the TV show's official soundtrack. R.E.M. also covered "Love Is All Around" for the soundtrack to the 1996 film I Shot Andy Warhol. A Wet Wet Wet arrangement of the song is also covered diegetically in season one, episode two, of the TV show Derry Girls.

== See also ==
- List of number-one singles in Australia during the 1990s
- List of number-one hits of 1994 (Austria)
- List of Dutch Top 40 number-one singles of 1994
- List of European number-one hits of 1994
- List of number-one singles in 1994 (New Zealand)
- List of number-one songs in Norway
- List of number-one singles and albums in Sweden
- List of UK Singles Chart number ones of the 1990s
- List of million-selling singles in the United Kingdom
