= Any Way That You Want Me =

1966 song written by Chip Taylor

- West German picture sleeve

Single by the Troggs
- B-side: "66-5-4-3-2-1"
- Released: 9 December 1966
- Genre: Baroque pop; pop rock
- Length: 2:57
- Label: Page One
- Songwriter: Chip Taylor
- Producer: Larry Page

The Troggs singles chronology
"I Can't Control Myself" (1966)	"Any Way That You Want Me" (1966)	"Give It to Me" (1967)

"Any Way That You Want Me" is a song written by Chip Taylor that was first released in September 1966 by Tina Mason as the B-side to her single "Finders Keepers". It has been covered by a number of artists, with the most successful version being by English rock band the Troggs.

== The Troggs version ==
=== Release and reception ===
Chip Taylor had previously written "Wild Thing", which had become an international hit for the Troggs earlier in 1966. After a further two hit singles, the Troggs chose to cover another of his compositions, "Any Way That You Want Me". However, it was very different from the Troggs' previous releases, as it was a gentler pop ballad compared to their garage rock songs.

Released in December 1966, "Any Way That You Want Me" proved to be a success, becoming a top-ten hit in the UK in January 1967. However, it wasn't released in North America until April 1967 following the release of "Give It to Me" as a single there in February 1967. It failed to be as successful as the Troggs' earlier singles there, completely missing the charts. The B-side, "66-5-4-3-2-1", was written by lead vocalist Reg Presley and was originally called "I Know What You Want", but was changed following the controversy of the band's previous single "I Can't Control Myself".

Reviewing for Record Mirror, Peter Jones described "Any Way That You Want Me" as "either the best the boys have done – or the worst. Depends if you like hearing classical-style cellos behind their soft, ballady type of image. In fact, it's a very good song by Chip "Wild Thing" Taylor, and is well sung". Penny Valentine for Disc and Music Echo described it as having "an insidiousness that makes it linger in your mind, not in the brash heavy-handed way of all the other Troggs successes, but in a subtle warm loving way. Which is very nice". Melody Maker wrote that "although Reg Presley sings well – his vocal style seems to have undergone a startling change – and the arrangement is clever, the song isn't exactly earth shattering. In parts it sounds like a Boston Pops version of "Twist and Shout" played at half speed". Cash Box described it as a "shuffling, easy-going, melodic, gentle romancer".

=== Charts ===
Chart (1967)	Peak position
Australia (Kent Music Report)	76
Denmark (Danmarks Radio)	16
Germany (GfK)	13
Ireland (IRMA)	11
Netherlands (Dutch Top 40)	15
Netherlands (Single Top 100)	9
South Africa (Springbok Radio)	6
Sweden (Kvällstoppen)	12
Sweden (Tio i Topp)	5
UK Disc and Music Echo Top 50	4
UK Melody Maker Top 50	4
UK New Musical Express Top 30	6
UK Record Retailer Top 50	8

== Other cover versions ==
- In October 1966, British beat group the Liverpool Five released a cover of the song as a single in the US which peaked at number 98 on the Billboard Hot 100.
- In June 1967, American psychedelic rock band H. P. Lovecraft released a cover of the song as their debut single.
- In June 1968, American rock band the American Breed released a cover of the song as a single from their album Pumpkin, Powder, Scarlet & Green. It peaked at number 88 on the Billboard Hot 100 and number 84 on the Canadian RPM chart.
- In July 1969, American singer Evie Sands released a cover of the song as a single from her album Any Way That You Want Me. It peaked at number 53 on the Billboard Hot 100, number 40 on the RPM chart and number 85 on the retrospective Australian Kent Music Report chart.
- In October 1969, American soul singer Walter Jackson released a cover of the song as a single which peaked at number 111 on the Billboard Bubbling Under Hot 100 and number 37 on the Best Selling Soul Singles chart.
- In August 1977, British singer Mary Mason released a medley of the song along with another of Taylor's songs "Angel of the Morning" as a single which peaked at number 27 on the UK Singles Chart.
- In August 1979, American singer Juice Newton released a cover of the song as a single from her album Take Heart. It peaked at number 81 on the Billboard Hot Country Singles chart.
- In 1980, Ronnie Spector released a cover on her debut solo album, Siren.
- In February 1985, a cover by Carlette peaked at number 60 on the Billboard Hot Country Singles chart.
- In June 1990, English rock band Spiritualized released a cover of the song as a single which peaked at number 75 on the UK Singles Chart.
