= Give It to Me (The Troggs song) =

1967 single by the Troggs

- West German picture sleeve

Single by the Troggs
- B-side: "You're Lying"
- Released: 10 February 1967
- Genre: Pop rock
- Length: 2:14
- Label: Page One
- Songwriter(s): Reg Presley
- Producer(s): Larry Page

The Troggs singles chronology
"Any Way That You Want Me" (1966)	"Give It to Me" (1967)	"Night of the Long Grass" (1967)

"Give It to Me" is a song by English rock band the Troggs, released as a single in February 1967. In the UK, it peaked just outside the top ten, ending their run of consecutive top-ten hits.

== Background and release ==
"Give It to Me" was written by lead vocalist Reg Presley and was released as the Troggs' sixth single. It was written and recorded in only three days. A specially tailored version of the song was featured in the 1966 Michelangelo Antonioni film Blowup.

Like in the UK, where "Give It to Me" only peaked at number 12 on the Record Retailer chart, it did not chart as highly in the rest of Europe compared to the Troggs' previous singles. It was released in the North America as the band's fourth single, with "Any Way That You Want Me" released there several months later. It performed poorly, missing out on all the national top-100 charts, though did chart on both Cash Box and Record World's extension charts.

Reviewing for Record Mirror, Peter Jones described "Give It to Me" as "basically very simple, very urgent, very dynamic. It builds to a climax featuring just the title phrase. It's a sort of rhythmic onslaught, yet gentle in a way". Penny Valentine for Disc and Music Echo wrote that "it's good Troggs-like stuff, no doubt about it. It will be a hit, no doubt about that either, because it has that odd insidious feel that all their records have. But how big a hit is another thing. It has a very odd melody and doesn't really DO anything. Nothing builds up or fades away or breaks. It just goes on. It's not boring, it's not exciting". Cash Box described it as a "thumping, low-keyed, pulsating, bluesy, funk-filled rock workout".

== Charts ==
Chart (1967)	Peak position
Australia (Go-Set)	26
Australia (Kent Music Report)	20
Austria (Ö3 Austria Top 40)	20
Belgium (Ultratop 50 Wallonia)	19
Germany (GfK)	10
Ireland (IRMA)	19
Netherlands (Dutch Top 40)	21
Netherlands (Single Top 100)	19
Rhodesia (Lyons Maid)	4
South Africa (Springbok Radio)	4
UK Disc and Music Echo Top 50	13
UK Melody Maker Top 50	12
UK New Musical Express Top 30	15
UK Record Retailer Top 50	12
US Cash Box Looking Ahead	35
US Record World Singles Coming Up	41
