= Hi Hi Hazel =

1966 single by Geno Washington & the Ram Jam Band

"Hi! Hi! Hazel"

Single by Geno Washington & the Ram Jam Band
- B-side: "Beach Bash"
- Released: 15 July 1966
- Recorded: 1966
- Studio: Pye Studios, London
- Genre: Soul
- Length: 3:21
- Label: Piccadilly
- Songwriters: Bill Martin; Phil Coulter
- Producer: John Schroeder

Geno Washington & the Ram Jam Band singles chronology
"Water" (1966)	"Hi! Hi! Hazel" (1966)	"Que Sera Sera" (1966)

"Hi Hi Hazel" is a song first released by soul band Geno Washington & the Ram Jam Band as a single in July 1966. A version by rock band the Troggs was released as a single in July 1967, and both were minor hits in the UK.

== Background and release ==
"Hi Hi Hazel" was written by songwriting duo Bill Martin and Phil Coulter. After joining publishing company KPM Music, the two managed to get a number of their songs recorded as album tracks for a range of artists like Dave Dee, Dozy, Beaky, Mick & Tich, Los Bravos and Ken Dodd. However, prior to "Hi Hi Hazel", they had yet to write a hit single. Whilst the song became their first success, it became Geno Washington & the Ram Jam Band's second hit, following the top-40 single "Water". Their version was released as "Hi! Hi! Hazel" and was backed with an instrumental, "Beach Bash", previously recorded by the Mar-Keys and written by Ben Branch, Al Jackson Jr. and Steve Cropper.

"Hi! Hi! Hazel" spent four weeks on the Record Retailer chart, peaking at number 45. It charted higher at number 38 on the Melody Maker chart and number 40 on the Disc and Music Echo chart. An edited version of the song was also released as a single in the US, though failed to chart. In February 1967, an EP by the band entitled Hi!, which included the song, peaked at number 7 on the Record Retailer EP chart.

Record Mirror wrote that "Hi! Hi! Hazel" has a "slow organ intro, then Geno starts in on singing almost Louis-style, in bluesy phrases and punching home just about every word. Very simple backing and a sort of joyous air about it all". Melody Maker wrote that the band "take a trip through a slow sexy rocker that will insinuate into a lot of hip ears. Listening to Geno's highly impressive vocal style one is reminded of Zoot Money with touches of Steve Marriott. But basically it's all Geno and all good".

== Charts ==
Chart (1966)	Peak position
UK Disc and Music Echo Top 50	40
UK Melody Maker Top 50	38
UK Record Retailer Top 50	45

== The Troggs version ==
"Hi Hi Hazel"
- Norwegian picture sleeve

Single by the Troggs

from the album From Nowhere
- B-side: "As I Ride By"
- Released: 14 July 1967
- Recorded: May 1966
- Studio: Olympic, London
- Genre: Pop rock
- Length: 2:47
- Label: Page One
- Songwriters: Bill Martin; Phil Coulter
- Producer: Larry Page

The Troggs singles chronology
"Night of the Long Grass" (1967)	"Hi Hi Hazel" (1967)	"Love Is All Around" (1967)

=== Background and release ===
Prior to Geno Washington & the Ram Jam Band's version, the Troggs had supposedly considered releasing their version as a single. The Troggs rendition features lead vocalist Reg Presley on the melodica, and was recorded in May 1966 at Olympic Studios in London. In the end, it was included on their album From Nowhere, released in July 1966.

In 1967, the Troggs decided to split from manager Larry Page, although in the end they stayed on his record label Page One. During the uncertainty of the band's future at the label, Page, unbeknownst to the Troggs, decided to release their version of "Hi Hi Hazel" as a single, backed with a previously unreleased song, "As I Ride By", written by drummer Ronnie Bond. In an interview in August 1967, guitarist Chris Britton said that they were made aware that it had been released as a single after hearing it on the radio.

Prior to the release of "Hi Hi Hazel", the Troggs had had a run of six top-20 hits; however, the single only managed three weeks on the Record Retailer chart, peaking at number 42. This was down to a lack of promotion of the single, with Britton saying that they "presume[d] that anyone who liked the song already had it on our LP or had bought the Geno Washington single". The band were not particularly concerned by the lack of success of "Hi Hi Hazel" and they would go on to recapture their previous success with the follow-up top-ten hit "Love Is All Around".

=== Charts ===
Chart (1967)	Peak position
Australia (Kent Music Report)	81
Germany (GfK)	36
Netherlands (Dutch Top 40)	39
UK Record Retailer Top 50	42

== Other cover versions ==
- In October 1966, American band Gary and the Hornets released a cover of the song as a single which peaked at number 96 on the Billboard Hot 100.
- In December 1966, Australian band Grandma's Tonic released a cover of the song as a single which peaked at number 95 on the retrospective Kent Music Report chart.
