= Mixed Bag (The Troggs album) =

Compilation album by The Troggs
- Released: April 1968
- Genre: Garage rock; psychedelic rock
- Length: 33:38
- Language: English
- Label: Page One
- Producer: Colin Frechter; Larry Page

The Troggs chronology
Cellophane (1967)	Mixed Bag (1968)	The Troggs (1975)

Mixed Bag (released in North America as Love Is All Around) is a 1968 studio album by British garage rock band The Troggs.

== Reception ==
Editors of AllMusic Guide scored Mixed Bag three out of five stars, with reviewer Richie Unterberger, calling the name appropriate for a "scrapheap" of songs compiled from singles, with several songs highlighted as strong, but the entire compilation being surpassed by the 2005 collection Hip Hip Hooray. In Colin Larkin's The Encyclopedia of Popular Music, he scores this release three out of five stars.

== Track listing ==
Side one

1. "Surprise Surprise" (Reg Presley) – 2:49
2. "You Can Cry If You Want To" (Presley) – 2:54
3. "Say Darlin'" (Chris Britton) – 2:47
4. "Marbles and Some Gum" (Pete Staples) – 2:06
5. "Purple Shades" (Presley) – 2:25
6. "Heads or Tails" (Britton) – 3:44

Side two

1. "Hip Hip Hooray" (Geoff Stevens, John Carter) – 2:20
2. "Little Girl" (Presley) – 2:59
3. "Maybe the Madman" (Britton) – 2:14
4. "Off the Record" (Staples) – 3:45
5. "We Waited for Someone" (Presley) – 2:52
6. "There´s Something About You" (Ronnie Bond) – 2:43

== Personnel ==
The Troggs

- Ronnie Bond – drums
- Chris Britton – guitar, backing vocals
- Reg Presley – lead vocals
- Pete Staples – bass, backing vocals

Additional personnel

- Keith Altham – liner notes
- Colin Frechter – production
- Larry Page – production

== Chart performance ==
Mixed Bag peaked at 109 on the Billboard 200.
