= I Can't Control Myself =

1966 single by the Troggs

- Dutch picture sleeve

Single by the Troggs
- B-side: "Gonna Make You"
- Released: 30 September 1966
- Recorded: 24 August 1966
- Studio: Olympic (London)
- Genre: Garage rock; beat
- Length: 3:05
- Label: Page One
- Songwriter: Reg Presley
- Producer: Larry Page

The Troggs singles chronology
"With a Girl Like You" (1966)	"I Can't Control Myself" (1966)	"Any Way That You Want Me" (1966)

"I Can't Control Myself" is a song by the English rock band the Troggs, released as a single in September 1966. It continued their success after "Wild Thing" and "With a Girl Like You", becoming a top-ten hit in a number of countries.

== Release and controversy ==
"I Can't Control Myself" was written by the Troggs lead vocalist Reg Presley and after several days of rehearsing in their home town Andover, the Troggs recorded the song on 24 August 1966 at Olympic Studios in London. It then released a month later as the first single on Page One Records, which had been co-founded by the band's manager and producer Larry Page. A continuing dispute in the US over the distribution of the Troggs' releases meant that "I Can't Control Myself" was simultaneously released by Atco and Fontana in September 1966.

"I Can't Control Myself" is known for its blatantly suggestive lyrics and therefore caused much controversy upon its release. It was banned from being played or performed on radio and TV in the UK, US and Australia. Whilst this did not impact sales in the UK or Australia, it did impact the song's chart performance in the US as Billboard took airplay into account with its charts.

The controversy revolved around the line "Your slacks are low and your hips are shown'". In an interview in 2008, Presley maintained that the lyric was him "just writing about hipster trousers", something that guitarist Chris Britton has also backed up. However, in an interview in 2011, Presley revealed that the inspiration for the song was from a girl in East Anglia who "had pillar-box red jeans cut so low you could see her pubic hair". The song was also controversial for its ending in which Presley screams, which some critics thought sounded like an orgasm; although both Presley and Britton have strongly denied that was the intention.

== Reception ==
Reviewing for Disc and Music Echo, Penny Valentine wrote that "the Troggs have done it again. Another number one on the way. The Troggs' well-developed signature – the "ba bahs" and the solid Presley sexiness are all apparent. A more mature and hideously evil sound on this song that they've managed before". Billboard described it as a "medium paced rock-ballad from the winning British group [that] should equal the success of "Wild Thing". Pounding beat and teen-slanted lyrics add up to a hit". Cash Box described it as "a potent, hard driving, throbbing exciter in the bag that the fans expect the Troggs to be in".

== Charts ==
Chart (1966–67)	Peak position
Australia (Go-Set)	19
Australia (Kent Music Report)	13
Austria (Ö3 Austria Top 40)	3
Belgium (Ultratop 50 Flanders)	8
Belgium (Ultratop 50 Wallonia)	3
Canada Top Singles (RPM)	44
Denmark (Danmarks Radio)	3
Germany (GfK)	2
Ireland (IRMA)	3
Netherlands (Dutch Top 40)	7
Netherlands (Single Top 100)	5
Norway (VG-lista)	4
Rhodesia (Lyons Maid)	1
Spain (Promusicae)	17
Sweden (Kvällstoppen)	7
Sweden (Tio i Topp)	7
UK Disc and Music Echo Top 50	2
UK Melody Maker Top 50	2
UK New Musical Express Top 30	3
UK Record Retailer Top 50	2
US Billboard Hot 100	43
US Cash Box Top 100	38
