= Athens Andover =

Studio album by The Troggs
- Released: March 1992
- Recorded: September 1991
- Studio: John Keane Studio, Athens, Georgia; Jacobs Studio, Farnham, Surrey
- Genre: Rock
- Label: Rhino
- Producer: Larry Page

Athens Andover is a collaborative album between the Troggs and what was then three-quarters of R.E.M. Released in March 1992, the name of the album is derived from the hometowns of the two bands: Andover, Hampshire, in England, and Athens, Georgia, in the United States.

The joining of forces was sparked by R.E.M.'s covering the Troggs' single "Love Is All Around" in live performances during promotion for the former's album Out of Time (1991). One such performance, on the American radio show Rockline in April 1991, was released as a B-side on R.E.M.'s single "Radio Song".

"We'd just done a show in a hotel, and as the lift door opened there was this crowd waiting for autographs and someone shouted out, 'What do you think of R.E.M. doing your record?'" explained Troggs frontman Reg Presley to Record Collector editor Peter Doggett. "Well, I hadn’t heard of R.E.M. But my manager had, so he suggested working with them on our new album. And when I listened to their records, I thought they weren’t far removed from what we were doing when we started. They invited me and Chris over to Athens to work with them for a week. By this time I'd realised quite how big they were, and so we spent the first five minutes walking around one another going, 'Wow'. It was quite different working with them. With the Troggs it had always just been you had a guitar and so you had a sound. With them, you had a roomful of 65 guitars to get exactly the right sound. They were very laid back, very normal. There was no high falutin sort of, 'Listen to this 'cos we’re better than you.' After all, their drummer was selling hamburgers until a few weeks before they made it. He was doing quite well with his own business. Having been a roofer when "Wild Thing" hit the charts, I could relate to that."

Recording took place over a one-week period in September 1991 at John Keane's Studio in Athens. Bill Berry, Mike Mills and Peter Buck made up the R.E.M. contingent. Vocalist Michael Stipe was not involved. "Nowhere Road" was composed by the R.E.M. trio along with Peter Holsapple of The dB's, who was R.E.M.'s auxiliary musician for their 1991 tour.

The album was re-released by the Troggs as Athens, Georgia & Beyond (1996) with seven additional tracks not recorded during the R.E.M. collaboration.

== Track listing ==
1. "Crazy Annie" (Chip Taylor) – 4:43
2. "Together" (Reg Presley) – 4:01
3. "Tuned into Love" (Daniel Boone, Larry Page) – 3:39
4. "Déjà Vu" (Tony James Shevlin) – 3:33
5. "Nowhere Road" (Bill Berry, Peter Buck, Peter Holsapple, Mike Mills) – 4:44
6. "Dustbowl" (Presley) – 3:26
7. "I'm in Control" (Holsapple) – 3:51
8. "Don't You Know" (Presley) – 4:06
9. "What's Your Game" (Presley) – 4:56
10. "Suspicious" (Presley) – 4:22
11. "Hot Stuff" (Boone, Page) – 4:02

== Personnel ==
- Reg Presley – lead vocals
- Chris Britton – acoustic and electric guitars, backing vocals, bass
- Peter Lucas – acoustic and electric guitars, backing vocals, bass
- Peter Buck – acoustic, 12-string and electric guitars, mandolin
- Peter Holsapple – acoustic, 12-string and electric guitars
- John Keane – pedal steel, electric and slide guitars, backing vocals
- Daniel Boone – electric guitar, backing vocals
- Mike Mills – bass, organ, accordion
- Dave Maggs – drums
- Bill Berry – drums, percussion

Technical

- David Baker, John Keane - engineer
- Brian Burrows, Larry Page - sleeve concept
- Brian Burrows - sleeve design, typesetting
