= Night of the Long Grass =

1967 single by the Troggs

- Danish picture sleeve

Single by the Troggs
- B-side: "Girl in Black"
- Released: 19 May 1967
- Genre: Psychedelic rock
- Length: 3:04
- Label: Page One
- Songwriter: Reg Presley
- Producer: Larry Page

The Troggs singles chronology
"Give It to Me" (1967)	"Night of the Long Grass" (1967)	"Hi Hi Hazel" (1967)

Audio
- "Night of the Long Grass" on YouTube

"Night of the Long Grass" is a song by English rock band the Troggs, released as a single in May 1967. It continued their slight dip in chart performance, though still became their sixth top-twenty hit in the UK.

== Background and release ==
Originally towards the end of April 1967, the next Troggs single was announced as "My Lady" backed with "Girl in Black". However, a week before its release, it was announced that they would be changing the A-side and instead release "Night of the Long Grass" as a single. As "My Lady" was withdrawn so soon before its expected release, around 26,000 copies of that single had already been pressed. It was given a release in South Africa as was also "Night of the Long Grass", with the latter backed with "Hi Hi Hazel". "My Lady" was later included on the Troggs album Cellophane and a cover by Jet Harris was released as a single in July 1967.

== Commercial performance and reception ==
"Night of the Long Grass" entered the Record Retailer charts at number 39 on 7 June 1967, before peaking at number 17 on 28 June. In total, the single spent six weeks on the charts. Presley commented on the single's relative chart failure, stating that "Night of the Long Grass" did not receive the "big plugs yet", including airplay on pirate radio. The Troggs recorded a promotional film for "Night of the Long Grass" in Epping Forest during early June 1967. The film was directed by Swedish director Peter Goldmann first screened on Swedish television. Presley believed that the film would give the single a "shot in the arm" when it was aired.

Reviewing for Record Mirror, Peter Jones described "Night of the Long Grass" as "much stronger than the mooted "My Lady" single – in fact, it becomes darned infectious after just a couple of plays. Lyrics worth a close listen, with atmospheric guitar and percussion backing… and the vocal comes through as if hidden behind a wall of bricks or grass or something. Curious vocals sounds behind, too". Guest reviewing for Disc and Music Echo, Dusty Springfield wrote "What a creepy beginning! And a lovely, sexy, sinister vocal from Reg. On first hearing though, it's not as catchy as some of their others but it's got lots of nice ideas and their popularity will see it into the chart I'm sure". Presley was more satisfied with the way the single was built than their earlier releases.

== Charts ==
Weekly chart performance for "Night of the Long Grass"
Chart (1967)	Peak position
Australia (Kent Music Report)	79
France (SNEP)	82
Ireland (RTÉ)	23
Netherlands (Dutch Top 40)	33
Poland (Scout Radio)	3
UK (Disc and Music Echo)	19
UK (Melody Maker)	19
UK (New Musical Express)	21
UK (Record Retailer)	17
West Germany (Media Control)	23
