= I Want to Kiss Ringo Goodbye =

1965 Song by Penny Valentine

"I Want to Kiss Ringo Goodbye" is a 1965 novelty single recorded by English music journalist Penny Valentine at the start of her journalistic career. The song was released in March 1965 at the height of Beatlemania and is about Ringo Starr, the drummer of The Beatles. The song was produced by Chuck Sagle and written by Sagle under the pseudonyms Bob Strong and Carl Stevens. Its B-side was "Show Me the Way to Love You", composed by Doug Goodwin and produced by Sagle.

The lyrics are told from the viewpoint of a girl who feels sad because Ringo Starr is about to get married. As she loved the musician and feels jealous of the woman whom he is about to marry she wants to kiss him goodbye before the wedding. In real life Ringo Starr had indeed married on 11 February 1965 to Maureen Cox.
