= List of Dutch Top 40 number-one singles of 1994 =

These hits topped the Dutch Top 40 in 1994 (see 1994 in music).

Issue date	Artist	Song
1 January	André van Duin	"Het pizzalied (Effe wachte...)"
8 January	Laura Pausini	"La solitudine"
15 January	Paul de Leeuw	"Ik wil niet dat je liegt" / "Waarheen waarvoor"
22 January	Paul de Leeuw	"Ik wil niet dat je liegt" / "Waarheen waarvoor"
29 January	Paul de Leeuw	"Ik wil niet dat je liegt" / "Waarheen waarvoor"
5 February	Paul de Leeuw	"Ik wil niet dat je liegt" / "Waarheen waarvoor"
12 February	Paul de Leeuw	"Ik wil niet dat je liegt" / "Waarheen waarvoor"
19 February	Paul de Leeuw	"Ik wil niet dat je liegt" / "Waarheen waarvoor"
26 February	Paul de Leeuw	"Ik wil niet dat je liegt" / "Waarheen waarvoor"
5 March	Paul de Leeuw	"Ik wil niet dat je liegt" / "Waarheen waarvoor"
12 March	Cappella	"Move on Baby"
19 March	Cappella	"Move on Baby"
26 March	Mariah Carey	"Without You"
2 April	Mariah Carey	"Without You"
9 April	Mariah Carey	"Without You"
16 April	Mariah Carey	"Without You"
23 April	Mariah Carey	"Without You"
30 April	Mariah Carey	"Without You"
7 May	Reel 2 Real feat. The Mad Stuntman	"I Like to Move It"
14 May	Reel 2 Real feat. The Mad Stuntman	"I Like to Move It"
21 May	Reel 2 Real feat. The Mad Stuntman	"I Like to Move It"
28 May	Reel 2 Real feat. The Mad Stuntman	"I Like to Move It"
4 June	Prince	"The Most Beautiful Girl in the World"
11 June	Prince	"The Most Beautiful Girl in the World"
18 June	2 Unlimited	"The Real Thing"
25 June	2 Unlimited	"The Real Thing"
2 July	Johan & de Groothandel	"As Dick me hullep nodig heb"
9 July	Johan & de Groothandel	"As Dick me hullep nodig heb"
16 July	2 Brothers on the 4th Floor	"Dreams (Will Come Alive)"
23 July	2 Brothers on the 4th Floor	"Dreams (Will Come Alive)"
30 July	2 Brothers on the 4th Floor	"Dreams (Will Come Alive)"
6 August	2 Brothers on the 4th Floor	"Dreams (Will Come Alive)"
13 August	All-4-One	"I Swear"
20 August	Wet Wet Wet	"Love Is All Around"
27 August	Wet Wet Wet	"Love Is All Around"
3 September	Wet Wet Wet	"Love Is All Around"
10 September	Wet Wet Wet	"Love Is All Around"
17 September	Rednex	"Cotton Eye Joe"
24 September	Marco Borsato	"Dromen zijn bedrog"
1 October	Marco Borsato	"Dromen zijn bedrog"
8 October	Marco Borsato	"Dromen zijn bedrog"
15 October	Marco Borsato	"Dromen zijn bedrog"
22 October	Marco Borsato	"Dromen zijn bedrog"
29 October	Marco Borsato	"Dromen zijn bedrog"
5 November	Marco Borsato	"Dromen zijn bedrog"
12 November	Marco Borsato	"Dromen zijn bedrog"
19 November	Marco Borsato	"Dromen zijn bedrog"
26 November	Marco Borsato	"Dromen zijn bedrog"
3 December	Marco Borsato	"Dromen zijn bedrog"
10 December	Marco Borsato	"Dromen zijn bedrog"
17 December	Marco Borsato	"Dromen zijn bedrog"
24 December	Hermes House Band	"I Will Survive"
31 December	Hermes House Band	"I Will Survive"

== See also ==
- 1994 in music
