= Cellophane (The Troggs album) =

Studio album by The Troggs
- Released: 8 December 1967
- Genre: Garage rock; psychedelic rock
- Length: 30:57
- Language: English
- Label: Page One

The Troggs chronology
Trogglodynamite (1967)	Cellophane (1967)	Mixed Bag (1968)

Cellophane is a 1967 studio album by British garage rock band The Troggs.

== Reception ==
Editors of AllMusic Guide scored Cellophane three out of five stars, with reviewer Richie Unterberger, noting that the shift to psychedelia was a good choice, but the songwriting is weak. In Colin Larkin's The Encyclopedia of Popular Music, he scores this release four out of five stars.

== Track listing ==
Side one

1. "Little Red Donkey" (Chris Britton, Pete Staples, Reg Presley, and Ronnie Bond) – 2:13
2. "Too Much of a Good Thing" (John Gillard, Terry Fogg) – 2:47
3. "Butterflies and Bees" (Britton) – 1:54
4. "All of the Time" (Presley) – 2:08
5. "Seventeen" (Presley) – 2:38
6. "Somewhere My Girl Is Waiting" (Art Wayne) – 2:49

Side two

1. "It's Showing" (Presley) – 2:54
2. "Her Emotion" (Presley) – 2:28
3. "When Will the Rain Come" (Bond) – 2:40
4. "My Lady" (Presley) – 2:57
5. "Come the Day" (Bond) – 1:52
6. "Love Is All Around" (Presley) – 2:58

2004 CD bonus tracks

13. "That's What You Get Girl" (Dave Wright, Reginald Ball) – 1:59
14. "I Don't Know Why" (Wright, Ball) – 2:50
15. "Easy Loving" (Harold Spiro, Valerie Avon) – 2:58
16. "Give Me Something" (Staples) – 3:25
17. "Lover" (Britton" – 2:24
18. "Come Now" (Bond, Britton, Tony Murray, Presley) – 2:18
19. "The Raver" (Presley) – 2:46
20. "You" (Bond, Britton, Murray, Presley) – 2:32
21. Ronnie Bond – "Carolyn" (Jule Styne, Sammy Fay) – 2:31
22. Ronnie Bond – "Anything for You" (Ben Findon) – 2:35
23. Reg Presely – "Lucinda Lee" (Presley) – 3:05
24. Reg Presley – "Wichita Lineman" (Jimmy Webb) – 3:05

== Personnel ==
The Troggs

- Ronnie Bond – drums
- Chris Britton – guitar, backing vocals
- Reg Presley – lead vocals
- Pete Staples – bass, backing vocals

Additional personnel

- Keith Altham – liner notes
- Eroc – remastering at Eroc's Mastering Ranch (CD re-release)
- Mainartery – design (CD re-release)
- Chris Welch – liner notes (CD re-release)
- Barry Wentzell – cover photography
