= Gary and the Hornets =

American garage rock band

- Origin: Franklin, Ohio
- Genres: Garage rock
- Years active: 1966-1968
- Past members: Gary Calvert; Greg Calvert; Steve Calvert

Gary and the Hornets was a Franklin, Ohio based garage rock band who were known for their single "Hi Hi Hazel".

== History ==
The band's first single was their version of "Hi Hi Hazel" which slipped into the Billboard Hot 100 charts at #96. Gary was eleven, Greg was fourteen and Steve was seven at the time they recorded their first material in 1966. This was followed by "There's a Kind of Hush" (titled "Kind of Hush" on their version) that was a local and regional hit; it also "bubbled under" the Billboard charts at #127. The brothers recorded three more singles in 1967 and 1968. They also appeared on The Tonight Show Starring Johnny Carson in 1967 singing a cover of "Devil With a Blue Dress On."

In the 1960s the group did a commercial for Oscar Mayer wieners in which they sang and played the music to the "Oscar Mayer Weiner" jingle. https://flatfieldrecords.com/gary-the-hornets-the-grooviest-band-to-ever-sing-about-weiners/

Greg's son, guitarist Casey Calvert, member of the rock band Hawthorne Heights died in 2007, at age 26.

== Members ==
- Gary Calvert - vocals, guitar
- Greg Calvert - bass guitar
- Steve Calvert - drums

== Discography ==
Singles

- "Hi Hi Hazel" b/w "Patty Girl" - Smash Records [2061] (1966)
- "Kind of Hush" b/w "That's All for Now Sugar Baby" - Smash Records [2078] (1967)
- "Times are Fine" one-sided flexi-disc - Smash Records (1967)
- "Baby It's You" b/w "Tell Tale" - Smash Records [2090] (1967)
- "Turn On the World" b/w "Holdin' Back" - Smash Records [2145] (1968)
