= Kinky Music =

1965 studio album by the Larry Page Orchestra

Studio album by the Larry Page Orchestra
- Released: 18 June 1965
- Genre: Easy listening; middle of the road
- Length: 31:01
- Label: Decca
- Producer: Larry Page

The Larry Page Orchestra chronology
Kinky Music (1965)	Executive Suite (1967)

Professional ratings
Review scores
Source	Rating
AllMusic	2.5/5 stars

Kinky Music is a studio album by the Larry Page Orchestra, released on 18 June 1965 by Decca Records. The album consists of orchestral middle of the road or easy listening arrangements of compositions by Ray Davies, principal songwriter of the English rock band the Kinks, whom Larry Page then managed. The album fit in a trend of orchestral arrangements of popular British rock acts, like George Martin's 1964 album Off the Beatle Track. Davies did not participate in any aspect of the album's creation, nor did any of the Kinks perform on it. The recordings instead featured then prodigious session musicians, like Jimmy Page, Big Jim Sullivan and John Paul Jones.

Page considered the work a marketing exercise to introduce Davies' melodic talent to a wider audience, but the album sold poorly. Davies was generally supportive or sarcastic regarding the album upon its release, but he later criticised the project as exploitative, calling it both "appalling" and "horrible". Writing in retrospect for AllMusic, critic Richie Unterberger describes the album "frivolous", "bland" and unlikely to interest even devoted Kinks fans.

== Track listing ==
All tracks are written by Ray Davies, except where noted.

Side one

1. "Tired Of Waiting For You" – 2:41
2. "Come On Now" – 2:02
3. "Something Better Beginning" – 2:59
4. "You Really Got Me" – 2:27
5. "Don't Ever Change" – 3:14
6. "Got My Feet On The Ground" (Dave Davies, R. Davies) – 3:15

Side two

1. "All Day And All Of The Night" – 2:39
2. "One Fine Day" (D. Davies) – 2:09
3. "Just Can't Go To Sleep" – 2:47
4. "Revenge" (R. Davies, Larry Page) – 2:03
5. "I Took My Baby Home" – 2:29
6. "Ev'rybody's Gonna Be Happy" – 2:16
