= The Troggs Tapes =

Bootleg recording of an argument

The Troggs Tapes is a bootleg recording of the English rock band the Troggs. It was originally recorded in 1970, and consists of band members arguing over the recording of a song, with frequent profanity. It has become one of the best-known spoken-word bootleg recordings, and influenced work such as the film This is Spinal Tap.

== Background ==
By the late 1960s, the Troggs' commercial success had waned. The production company Dick James Music offered them studio time in the hope of recording a hit single and revitalising their career. The band – lead singer Reg Presley, guitarist Chris Britton, bassist Tony Murray and drummer Ronnie Bond – together with producer Dennis Berger were booked into DJM's studios in London, which suffered from having the control room and recording room in separate locations, linked only by a Tannoy system and closed-circuit television. The band intended to record a song called "Tranquility", but had not rehearsed before entering the studio. The session quickly descended into acrimony, with Presley verbally assaulting drummer Bond's ideas and competence. Bond was unable to copy Presley's idea of a drum pattern, which culminated in Presley exclaiming "Fuckin' drummer. Oi shit 'em!"

Larry Page, the band's original producer, said that he usually recorded the band quickly and without fuss, as he expected arguments would otherwise arise. He was not invited to the session that produced The Troggs Tapes and claimed the lack of his usual working methods were a key source of the arguments and tension that resulted.

Despite the verbal assaults between Presley and Bond, the pair remained friends until Bond's departure from the band in 1984. Presley later said, "When you know somebody that well, you can say almost anything."

== Release ==
The argument was captured on tape by engineer Clive Franks with help of tape op Barry Sherlock, and made its way onto bootlegs in the early 1970s. The release gave the Troggs an infamous reputation, though it also raised their public profile. Though the band's career collapsed shortly after the session, it was revitalised by the bootleg's notoriety and led to the band reforming and becoming popular with punk rock audiences towards the end of the 1970s.

Presley was originally unhappy with the release, but later gave a positive opinion of it, saying that bands could listen to it as an example of why they should relax in the studio and not take things seriously.

In 2011, Uncut ranked The Troggs Tapes at number 50 in its list of "The 50 Best Bootlegs", deeming it "an hilarious, 12-minute swearathon" and comparing it to Orson Welles' complaints in Frozen Peas from the same year, and Oasis' "Wibbling Rivalry" (1995).

== Cultural references ==
The Troggs Tapes were referenced in the Father Ted episode "A Song for Europe". In this episode, the priests Ted and Dougal write a song for Ireland in the "Eurosong Contest". In one scene, Ted is shown getting angry at Dougal for being unable to play the correct note. Ted swears at Dougal similar to the way Presley swore at Bond in the original bootleg. In the Father Ted script book, one of the episode's writers Graham Linehan notes that he initially wanted the scene to run longer, but that it was ultimately cut down to just long enough for people familiar with the out-take to get the reference. Dermot Morgan, who played Ted, enjoyed the scene, which allowed him to swear liberally.

The rock/comedy film This is Spinal Tap has a scene where the band are having an argument in a similar style. Presley later speculated that Peter Cook and Dudley Moore's series of Derek and Clive recordings, consisting of surreal and obscene conversations not originally intended for release, may have been inspired by The Troggs Tapes. Uncut also credit it for influencing The Comic Strip's fictional band Bad News.
