= Liverpool Five =

English beat music group (1963–1968)

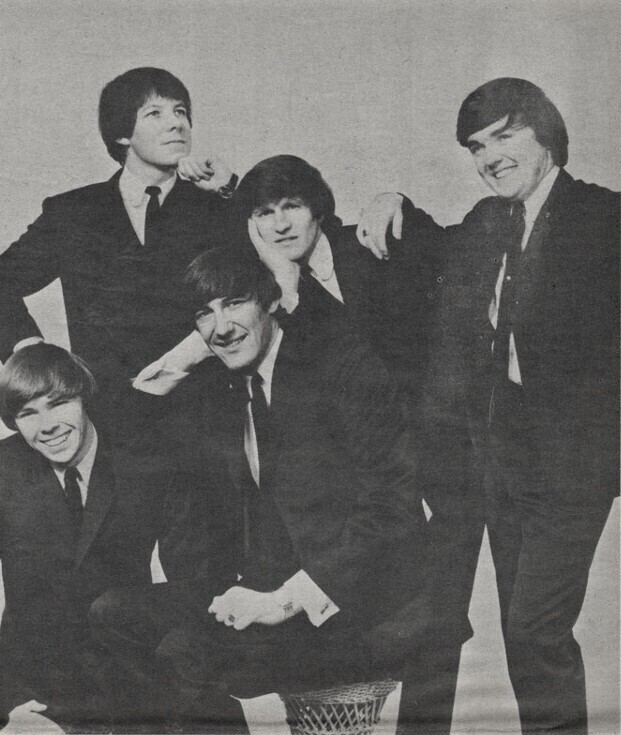
- Liverpool Five in 1965

Background information
- Also known as: Liverpool 5 The 5 Liverpools; Los Cinco de Liverpool (in Argentina); Liverpool Beatles (in Japan and Korea)
- Origin: London, England
- Genres: Beat
- Years active: 1963–1968
- Label: RCA
- Past members: Steve Laine; Ken Cox; Dave Burgess; Ron Henley; Jimmy May

The Liverpool Five were a beat group that was part of the British Invasion-era of the 1960s. The group played throughout Europe and Asia before achieving the peak of their success in the United States between 1965 and 1967.

== Career ==
Formed in England in 1963 as the Steve Laine Combo, the group comprised Steve Laine (lead vocals), Ken Cox (guitar and vocals), Dave Burgess (bass and vocals), Ron Henley (keyboards, sax and vocals) and Jimmy May (drums and vocals). The Steve Laine Combo played in clubs such as the Flamingo in Soho, and were spotted by the owners Rik and Johnny Gunnell. On a tour of Germany arranged by the Gunnells in early 1964, the band was signed to a management contract by German impresario Karl Buchmann, who added them to a large-venue tour of Germany and Austria. Following that tour, at Buchmann's suggestion, the group changed its name to The Liverpool Five, to capitalize on the international popularity of The Beatles. Despite the name, none of the group members were from Liverpool; all were Londoners except Burgess, who was from Cumbria.

Before leaving Germany, the band recorded an album on CBS Records for European release titled Tokio International, and a single "Tokio" / "SkinnyMinny", the first releases under the name '5Liverpools'. While in Germany in 1964 the band successfully auditioned to tour Japan, and performed at the Korakuen Arena as part of the Tokyo Olympics. One UK single, "Lum D' Lum D' Lum High" / "Good Golly Miss Molly", as the 'Liverpool 5', was released on the Pye subsidiary label, Piccadilly Records in 1964.

After touring the Far East, where few other British rock bands had been, they moved to the West Coast of the United States in March 1965, with an initial base in Spokane, Washington, before settling as residents in Los Angeles. From their new base, they played all over the US and Canada, by themselves and with acts including The Lovin' Spoonful, Stevie Wonder, The Kinks and The Rolling Stones. One of the band's biggest US concerts was as a featured artist on the 'Beach Boys Summer Spectacular' at the Hollywood Bowl in July 1965, alongside The Beach Boys, The Righteous Brothers and The Byrds.

In the United States, under contract with RCA Victor, the group released a number of singles, together with two albums produced by Al Schmitt. In 1966 their recording of Chip Taylor's "Any Way That You Want Me" (b/w Oscar Brown Jr's "The Snake") became their only appearance on the national chart, spending one week on the Billboard Hot 100 at #98. They also appeared on television shows such as American Bandstand, Where the Action Is and Hullabaloo, plus many music shows on local stations throughout the US. Local radio stations often sponsored their concerts.

The Liverpool Five were the first to record "(I'm Not Your) Steppin' Stone", later a big hit for The Monkees, but their version was not released immediately.

Two albums on RCA Victor, Arrive (LSP 3583) (1966) and Out of Sight (LSP 3682) (1967), were reasonably successful, particularly in the Pacific Northwest. The group disbanded in 1968, by which point Fred Dennis from Spokane, Washington, later of the Sonics, had replaced Dave Burgess on bass. Drummer Jimmy May returned to live in England while the others remained in the United States and embarked on new careers in various professions.

Before finally disbanding, they recorded one last single for RCA under the name Common Market (RCA 47-9302). The tracks were the Cat Stevens composition "I Love My Dog" backed with Tim Buckley's "Wings".

== Later years ==
In 1999, Rockinbeat Records released Liverpool Five- Arrive- Out of Sight in Europe, a CD containing all tracks from the group's two RCA albums. In April 2008, Sundazed Music released a CD with eighteen of the group's RCA recordings, which were remastered and packaged as The Best of the Liverpool Five (SC11158).

In 2010, the group got together for a long-awaited reunion concert in Sacramento, California in order to celebrate the 70th birthday of lead singer Steve Laine. Dennis Moffett joined the band on drums for the first reunion. In 2016, a second reunion concert for the ages took place in Fairfield, California. This time to celebrate the 70th birthday of guitarist Ken Cox, the youngest member of the group. James Grayberg joined the band on drums for the second reunion.

== Discography ==
=== Studio albums ===
Title	Album details
Tokio International	Released: 1965 (Germany); Label: CBS
Arrive	Released: June 1966 (US); Label: RCA Victor
Out Of Sight	Released: January 1967 (US); Label: RCA Victor

=== Compilation albums ===
Title	Album details
Arrive / Out Of Sight	Released: 1999 (Germany); Label: Rock-In-Beat-Records
The Best Of The Liverpool Five	Released: 2008 (US); Label: Sundazed

=== Singles ===
Release date	Title	Record label	Peak chart positions	Album
Release date	Title	Record label	US	Album
1964	"Good Golly Miss Molly" b/w "Lum D' Lum D' Lum High"	Picadilly 1255	-	Non-album single
October 1964	"Tokio" b/w "Skinny Minny" (Released as the 5 Liverpools)	CBS 1623	-	Tokio International
May 1965	"That's What I Want" b/w "Everything's Al'right"	RCA Victor 47–8578	-	Non-album singles
August 1965	"If You Gotta Go, Go Now" b/w "Too Far Out"	RCA Victor 47-8660	-	Non-album singles
December 1965	"Heart" b/w "I Just Can't Believe It"	RCA Victor 47-8725	-	Arrive
April 1966	"She's Mine" b/w "Sister Love"	RCA Victor 47-8816	-	Arrive
August 1966	"New Directions" b/w "What A Crazy World (We're Living In)"	RCA Victor 47-8906	-	Non-album single
October 1966	"Any Way That You Want Me" b/w "The Snake"	RCA Victor 47-8968	98	Out Of Sight
March 1967	"Cloudy" b/w "She's (Got Plenty Of Love)"	RCA Victor 47-9158	-	Non-album singles
August 1967	"I Love My Dog" b/w "Wings" (Released as the Common Market)	RCA Victor 47-9302	-	Non-album singles
