= The Troggs =

English band

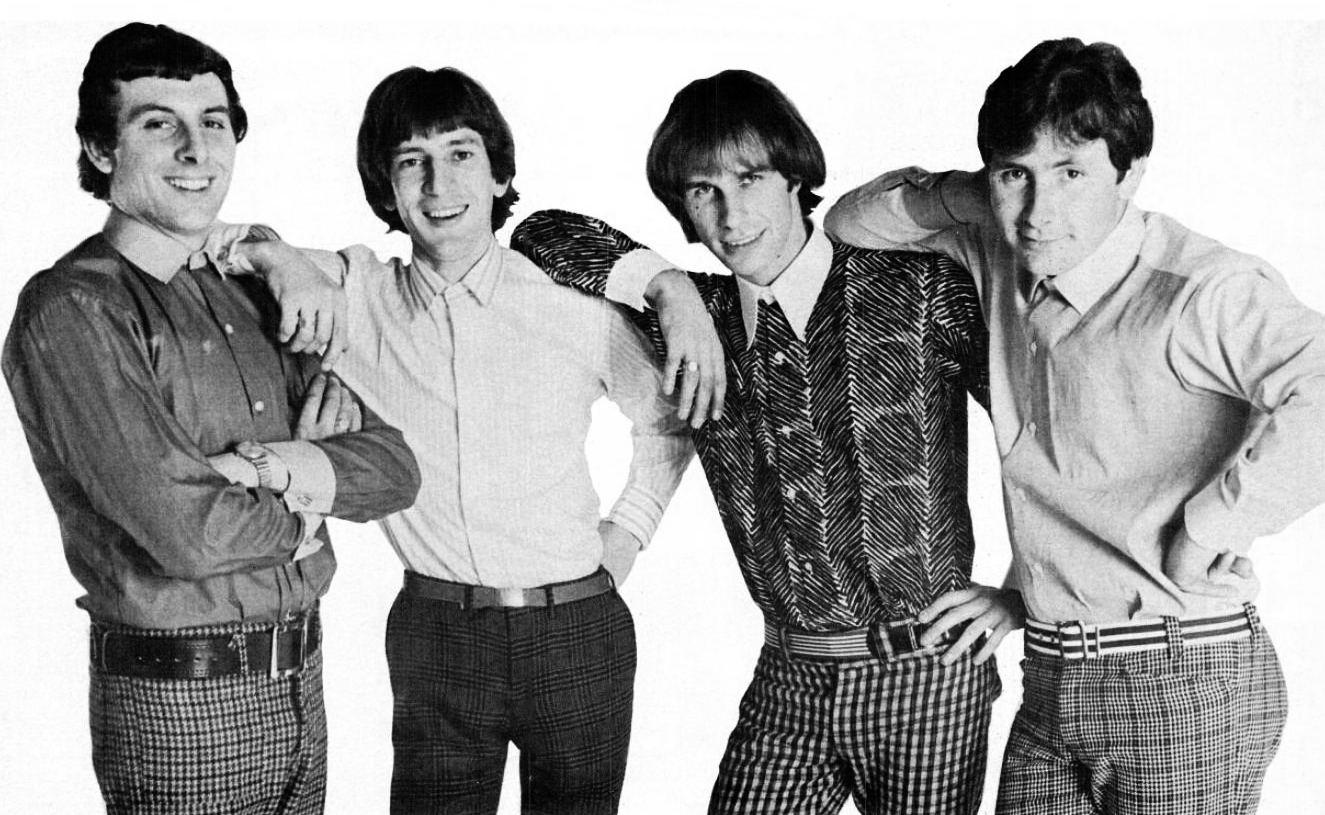
- The Troggs in 1966. L-R: Pete Staples, Ronnie Bond, Chris Britton and Reg Presley

Background information
- Also known as: The Troglodytes
- Origin: Andover, Hampshire, England
- Genres: Garage rock; proto-punk; freakbeat
- Years active: 1964–present
- Labels: Fontana; Page One; Penny Farthing; Rosa Honung
- Members: Dave Peters; Chris Britton; Chris Allen; Stu Clark; Martin Shorrock
- Past members: Reg Presley; Ronnie Bond; Pete Staples; Tony Murray; Richard Moore; David Wright; Colin Fletcher; Jo Burt; Dave Maggs; Darren Bond; Pete Lucas
- Website: thetroggs.co.uk

The Troggs (originally called the Troglodytes) are an English rock band formed in Andover, Hampshire, in May 1964. Their most famous songs include the US chart-topper "Wild Thing", "With a Girl Like You" and "Love Is All Around", all of which sold over 1 million copies and were awarded gold discs. "Wild Thing" is ranked No. 257 on the Rolling Stone magazine's list of The 500 Greatest Songs of All Time and was an influence on garage rock and punk rock.

== History ==
Reg Presley (lead vocals) and Ronnie Bond (drums) were childhood friends and in the early 1960s formed an R&B band in their home town of Andover. In 1964 they were joined by Pete Staples (bass) and Chris Britton (guitar) and became the Troggs. They were signed by Larry Page, manager of the Kinks, in February 1966. They recorded on Page's Page One Records, and Page also leased them to CBS for the debut single "Lost Girl". Their most famous hit was the single "Wild Thing" which, with the help of television exposure on Thank Your Lucky Stars, reached number 2 in the UK (Reg Presley's song "From Home" was the B-side) and number 1 in the United States in July 1966. Its combination of a simple heavy guitar riff and flirtatious lyrics helped it quickly to become a garage rock standard (the recording also contains an ocarina solo). Despite having a number one single, the band's success in the U.S. was limited by the band not touring there until 1968.

The Troggs posing at Cheddar Caves, Somerset in 1966

They also had a number of other hits, including "With a Girl Like You" (a UK number 1 in July 1966, US number 29), "I Can't Control Myself" (a UK number 2 in September 1966; their first UK single release on the Page One label, POF 001; this was also their second and final dual-label release in the US, with Fontana retaining the rights to all subsequent releases), "Any Way That You Want Me" (UK number 8 in December 1966), all at Olympic Studios, "Give It to Me" (UK No.12 1967), "Night of the Long Grass" (UK number 17 in May 1967), "Love Is All Around" (UK number 5 in November 1967 and US number 7 in May 1968) plus "Hi Hi Hazel" (UK No.42, 1967). The band's popularity completely waned the following year. Former Plastic Penny bassist Tony Murray replaced Pete Staples in 1969. Richard Moore filled in for Britton on their 1972–1973 tour. In 1974, after a spell on Pye Records, in an attempt to re-create their 1960s successes, the Troggs re-united with Larry Page, now running Penny Farthing Records. The resulting cover version of the Beach Boys hit "Good Vibrations" failed to chart. A reggae version of "Wild Thing" also failed. Richard Moore and Colin Fletcher substituted for Britton, who temporarily quit music to manage a night club in Spain, for the recording of The Troggs Tapes album released in 1976. The band found a sympathetic ear at French label New Rose in the 1980s, releasing the Black Bottom LP (1982) and AU (1990).

In 1991, they recorded Athens Andover, an 11-song collaboration between themselves and three members of R.E.M. It was recorded in the American band's hometown of Athens, Georgia, and was released in March 1992. The band attempted to capitalise on this new exposure with two collaborations on new versions of "Wild Thing". A 1992 recording with actor Oliver Reed and snooker player Alex Higgins failed to chart, but another version the following year featuring Wolf from the TV show Gladiators reached number 69 in the UK Singles Chart. In 1994, Wet Wet Wet's cover of "Love Is All Around" was No. 1 in the UK for 15 weeks, resulting in substantial royalties for Presley.

Ronnie Bond died on 13 November 1992 of an undisclosed illness. His son, Darren Bond, became The Troggs' drummer in 2018, serving in that capacity until 2023.

In January 2012, Reg Presley retired after being diagnosed with lung cancer. The band carried on with new lead singer Chris Allen. Presley died on 4 February 2013.

As of 2017, Britton only played selected gigs.

Bass guitarist and backing vocalist Pete Lucas died on 16 December 2023, his 73rd birthday.

The band was still active as of 2024, featuring only Chris Britton of the original lineup.

== Legacy and influence ==
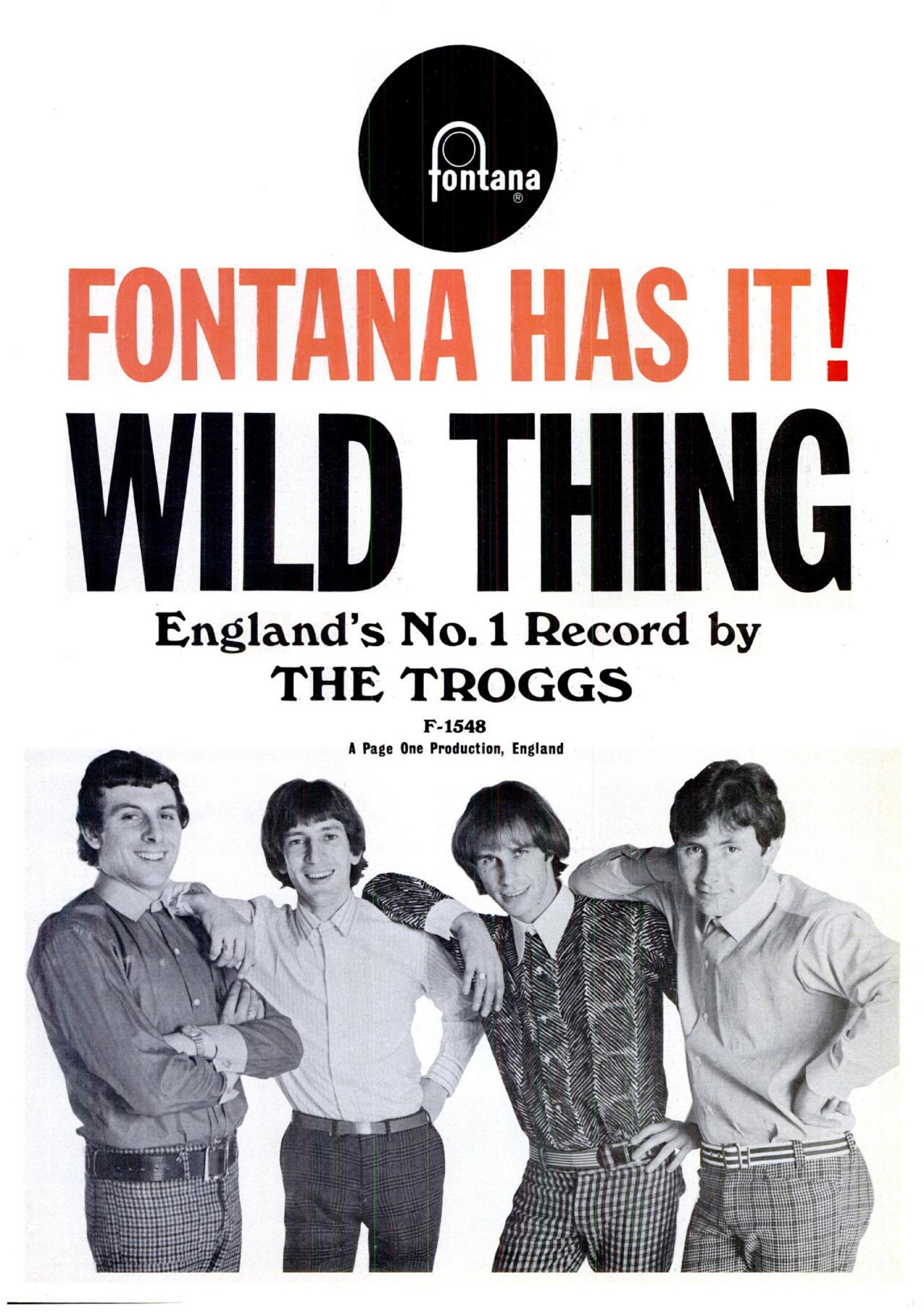
Billboard advertisement, June 4, 1966

The Troggs are widely seen as a highly influential band whose sound was an inspiration for garage rock and punk rock. Influential American critic Lester Bangs "called the band the progenitors of punk", according to NPR. For example, the Troggs influenced artists such as Iggy Pop, and the early version of British pop-punk pioneers Buzzcocks featured "I Can't Control Myself" in their live repertoire. The Ramones are also among the punk bands who cited the Troggs as an influence. "I Can't Control Myself" is perhaps the most enduring favourite of critics; it continues to be championed for its originality and lasting influence by radio hosts such as "Little" Steven Van Zandt.

A specially tailored version of "Give It to Me" featured in the "Sadie's Daydream" sequence of Michelangelo Antonioni's 1966 film Blowup. "I Can't Control Myself" appears at the climax of "The Little Chaos", the 1967 short film by German director Rainer Werner Fassbinder and in the "1967" episode of the 1996 British television serial Our Friends in the North.

The Jimi Hendrix Experience famously covered "Wild Thing" during their appearance at the 1967 Monterey Pop Festival, introducing it as the British/American joint "national anthem", and climaxing with Hendrix burning his guitar.

MC5 covered "I Want You" at their live shows and recorded the song for the 1969 album Kick Out the Jams, although they renamed it "I Want You Right Now".

An in-studio tape of Reg Presley's running commentary on a 1970 recording session, filled with in-fighting and swearing (known as The Troggs Tapes), was widely circulated in the music underground, and was included in the Archaeology box set, as well as the compilation album, The Rhino Brothers Present the World's Worst Records. The group infighting is believed to be the inspiration for a scene in the comedy film This Is Spinal Tap, where the band members are arguing. Some of this dialogue was sampled by the California punk band the Dwarves on their recording of a cover version of the Troggs song "Strange Movies".

"Wild Thing" is prominent in Jonathan Demme's 1986 film Something Wild.

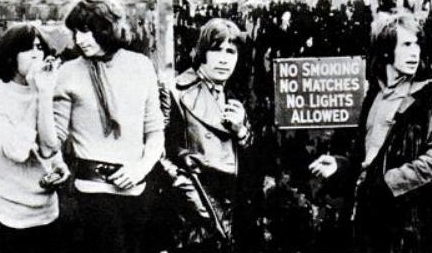
The Troggs in 1971

In 1990, the first hit for (and first single by) the band Spiritualized was a cover of "Anyway That You Want Me". This cover later was used in the movie Me and You and Everyone We Know. In 1991, "Love Is All Around" was covered by R.E.M. during live performances and was released later that year as a B-side on their "Radio Song" single. They also performed an acoustic version of the song on MTV Unplugged.

"With a Girl Like You" is featured uncut in a school dance scene from the 1991 Nicole Kidman/Noah Taylor movie Flirting. It also is featured in the films Shine (1996), The Good Night (2007) and The Boat That Rocked (2009).

Trogg is the name of one of Bane's three henchmen in Dennis O'Neil's Batman: Knightfall story arc (1993-1994). The other henchmen are Bird and Zombie, named after two other popular 1960s rock bands: the Byrds and the Zombies.

In 1994, Scottish band Wet Wet Wet's version of "Love Is All Around" spent 15 weeks at number one in the UK after its inclusion in Four Weddings and a Funeral. The authorship royalties enabled Reg Presley's 1990s research and publication on extraterrestrials and other paranormal phenomena.

The 1998 point-and-click adventure game Hopkins FBI features "I Can't Control Myself" and "Lost Girl".

The Troggs was the name of the high school gang in the 2002 movie Bang Bang, You're Dead that persuade the main character to join them in attacking their high school. A modified version of "Love Is All Around" was featured in the film Love Actually (2003), performed by actor Bill Nighy.

In 2012, Norwegian band Ulver covered the song "66-5-4-3-2-1" for their covers album Childhood's End.

In 2026, "With a Girl Like You" experienced a renaissance in popularity due to its use in a dog food commercial entitled "More Good Years" for the company The Farmer's Dog. One reviewer wrote that the ad was popular not only because of its catchy tune, but because of the emotional connection it invoked between viewers and their dogs.

== Band members ==
Founding members are in bold.

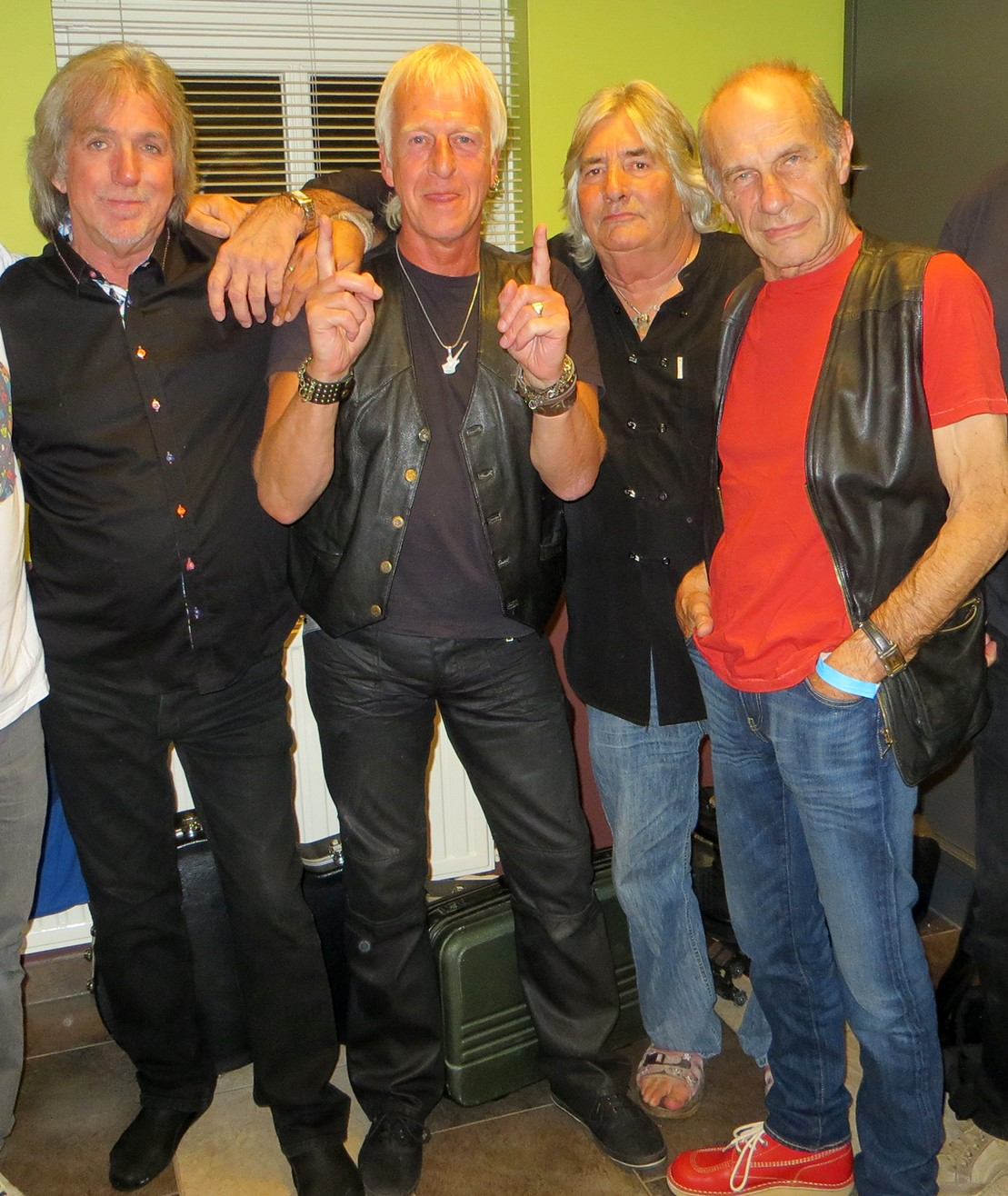
The Troggs in 2014

=== Current members ===
As of January 2026 the following are members of The Troggs:

- **Chris Britton**** – lead guitar, backing vocals (1964–1972, 1979–present; selected gigs only since 2017)
- Chris Allen – lead vocals (2012–present), bass (2022–present)
- Stu Clark** – guitar, backing vocals (2024–present)
- Martin Shorrock – drums (2023–present)
- Dave Peters – bass, backing vocals (2024–present)

**Note: "The Troggs founder member and guitarist Chris Britton, pictured, has decided to take time out from the band for sabbatical, replaced by Stu Clark. Chris Britton may appear on selected dates only."

=== Former members ===
- **Reg Presley** – lead vocals, ocarina (1964–2012; died 2013)
- **Ronnie Bond** – drums (1964–1988; died 1992)
- **Pete Staples** – bass, backing vocals (1964–1969)
- Tony Murray – bass, backing vocals (1969–1977, 1979–1984)
- Richard Moore – lead guitar (1972–1979), rhythm guitar (1976–1979)
- David Wright – rhythm guitar, backing vocals (1972–1974)
- Colin Fletcher – rhythm guitar, backing vocals (1974–1976)
- Pete Lucas – bass, backing vocals (1984–2022; died 2023)
- Jo Burt – bass (1977–1979)
- Dave Maggs – drums (1988–2018)
- Darren Bond – drums (2018–2023)
- John W Doyle – guitar (2017–2024)

== Discography ==
- From Nowhere (called Wild Thing in the United States) (1966)
- Trogglodynamite (1967)
- Cellophane (1967)
- Mixed Bag (compilation, titled Love Is All Around in the United States, 1968)
- The Troggs (1975)
- The Trogg Tapes (1976)
- Black Bottom (1981)
- Au (1990)
- Athens Andover (1992)
