= Colin Frechter =

- Born: Colin Michael Frechter; August 1938 (age 88)
- Occupation: Musical director
- Label: Page One
- Formerly of: Big John's Rock 'N' Roll Circus

Colin Michael Frechter (born August 1938) is a musical director, arranger, keyboard player, and vocalist.

== Biography ==
Frechter attended Aldenham School in Elstree.

== Career ==
Frechter worked in Harrods before joining the music business in 1958 as a clarinet player for the RAF. After his release from the Air Force in 1961, he worked for T.B. Harms & Francis, Day & Hunter, Inc. as a musical director for Page One Records.

Since 1967, he has worked with many artists, including the Four Tops, the Bay City Rollers (receiving a gold disc for the single "Bye, Bye, Baby (Baby, Goodbye)" and the L.P., Once Upon a Star), Elaine Paige, Showaddywaddy, Elton John, Take That (including Robbie Williams), Shakin' Stevens, and Brotherhood of Man (including "Save Your Kisses for Me").

Frechter was the pianist for Big John's Rock 'N' Roll Circus, a rock group formed by John Goodison, active from 1974 to 1979. The band went to number one in Rhodesia in 1975 with "Rockin' in the USA".

He currently directs theatre productions.
