= With a Girl Like You =

1966 single by the Troggs

- Dutch picture sleeve

Single by the Troggs
- B-side: "I Want You"
- Released: 8 July 1966
- Studio: Olympic, London
- Genre: Garage rock; pop rock
- Length: 2:08
- Label: Fontana
- Songwriter: Reg Presley
- Producer: Larry Page

The Troggs singles chronology
"Wild Thing" (1966)	"With a Girl Like You" (1966)	"I Can't Control Myself" (1966)

"With a Girl Like You" is a song by English rock band the Troggs, released as a single in July 1966. On the back of the success of "Wild Thing", "With a Girl Like You" topped the charts in the UK, and was similarly a success across Europe, but did not fare as well in the US, only peaking at number 29 on the Billboard Hot 100.

== Background and release ==
"With a Girl Like You" was written by the Troggs' lead vocalist Reg Presley whilst he was a bricklayer. He took inspiration from the vocals in "Barbara Ann", which became a hit for the Beach Boys in early 1966. "With a Girl Like You" was recorded at Olympic Studios at the same time as their previous single "Wild Thing". Both songs were recorded in two takes because they only had a short amount of recording time; manager Larry Page got them into the studio at the end of a session for his orchestra. The hook, with Presley shouting "Ba ba ba ba ba", was initially planned to be performed on trumpets, though the band opted for vocals instead.

"Wild Thing" had been simultaneously released in the US in May 1966 on two rival record labels, Atco and Fontana owing to a distribution dispute. Atco had released "With a Girl Like You" as the B-side, whereas Fontana released "Wild Thing" with the Presley-penned "From Home". Therefore, in July, Fontana released "With a Girl Like You" as a A-side single with "I Want You", written by Page and Colin Frechter, as the B-side, which is the same as the release in the UK. A settlement was reached later in 1966 which gave Fontana exclusive rights to future Troggs releases.

== Reception ==
Reviewing for New Musical Express, Derek Johnson wrote that "With a Girl Like You" "doesn't have the novelty spoken passages and tempo breaks of "Wild Thing" but it does have another gimmick – at the end of each line. The soloist repeats the melody in a sort of scat vocal that everyone can join in. It's a catchy mid-tempo tune, fairly simple in construction, and therefore quickly assimilated". Record Mirror wrote that it "should be every bit as big as "Wild Thing"" and similarly that "the boys plunge into a steady mid-tempo, with rasping lead voice, and sturdy beat and several vocal gimmicks on a teen song if ever there was one". Cash Box described it as "a low-down, funky, blues-soaked romancer".

"With a Girl Like You" experienced a resurgence in popularity in 2026 in the US from its use in a dog food ad entitled "More Good Years" for the company The Farmer's Dog. One reviewer wrote that the commercial resonated not only for its catchy tune, but because it makes an emotional connection between owners and their dogs.

== Charts ==
Chart (1966–67)	Peak position
Australia (Go-Set)	4
Australia (Kent Music Report)	8
Austria (Ö3 Austria Top 40)	6
Belgium (Ultratop 50 Flanders)	12
Belgium (Ultratop 50 Wallonia)	8
Canada Top Singles (RPM)	16
Denmark (Danmarks Radio)	3
Finland (Soumen Virallinen)	13
Germany (GfK)	2
Ireland (IRMA)	2
Italy (Musica e dischi)	11
Netherlands (Dutch Top 40)	1
Netherlands (Single Top 100)	1
New Zealand (Listener)	1
Norway (VG-lista)	2
Rhodesia (Lyons Maid)	1
South Africa (Springbok Radio)	1
Spain (Los 40 Principales)	1
Sweden (Kvällstoppen)	2
Sweden (Tio i Topp)	1
UK Disc and Music Echo Top 50	1
UK Melody Maker Top 50	1
UK New Musical Express Top 30	1
UK Record Retailer Top 50	1
US Billboard Hot 100	29
US Cash Box Top 100	41
