= Wild Thing (The Troggs song) =

- West German picture sleeve

Single by the Troggs

from the album From Nowhere... The Troggs
- B-side: "From Home" (UK); "With a Girl Like You" (US)
- Released: 22 April 1966
- Studio: Olympic Sound, London
- Genre: Garage rock; hard rock; proto-punk; psychedelia
- Length: 2:30
- Label: Fontana (UK); Atco & Fontana (US)
- Songwriter: Chip Taylor
- Producer: Larry Page

The Troggs singles chronology
"Lost Girl" (1966)	"Wild Thing" (1966)	"With a Girl Like You" (1966)

Music video
- "Wild Thing" on YouTube

"Wild Thing" is a song written by American songwriter Chip Taylor and popularized by the British rock band the Troggs. It was originally recorded and released by the American rock band the Wild Ones in 1965, but it did not chart. The following year, the Troggs' version peaked at number two on the UK Singles Chart and topped the charts in the United States. Their version of "Wild Thing" was ranked at number 257 on the Rolling Stone magazine's 2004 list of the 500 Greatest Songs of All Time. It has also been performed by many other musicians.

== Background ==
The first studio version was recorded by the Wild Ones, a band based in New York and set up by socialite Sybil Christopher. They had contacted composer Chip Taylor to ask him to write a song for them to release as a single. Taylor composed it very quickly: within a couple of minutes, he had the chorus and a "sexual-kind-of-feeling song" emerged.

On his demo version, Taylor banged on a tambourine while producer Ron Johnsen "was doing this little thing with his hands", as Taylor related it. The result sounded "cool". Producer Gerry Granahan approved the song and then produced the Wild Ones' recording, with vocals by Chuck Alden.

On its release in November 1965, the record failed to sell, and Alden later said that he regretted not performing the song in the same way as Taylor's demo. The solo in the middle of the song was performed by the recording engineer using his hands as a whistle. This sound was subsequently imitated by the Troggs in their version using an ocarina.

== The Troggs version ==
English rock band the Troggs recorded the song after their manager Larry Page recommended it, recalling later that it was "so weird and unusual that we just had to record it". "Wild Thing" was initially released on Fontana Records in the UK on 22 April 1966. The music video for "Wild Thing" was shot at the Odenplan Metro station in Stockholm, Sweden.

Owing to a distribution dispute, the Troggs' single was available on two competing labels in the US: Fontana and Atco Records. Because both pressings were taken from the same master recording, Billboard combined the sales for both releases, making it the only single to simultaneously reach number one for two companies in the US. A settlement was reached later in 1966 which gave Fontana exclusive rights to future Troggs releases.

On 25 June 1966, the single entered the Billboard Hot 100 chart and on 30 July 1966, it reached number one, where it remained for two weeks. In Canada, the single (Fontana 1548) reached number two on the RPM magazine charts on 8 August 1966.

In 2019, the Troggs version of the song was inducted into the Grammy Hall of Fame.

=== Charts ===
Chart (1966)	Peak position
Australia (Kent Music Report)	1
Austria (Ö3 Austria Top 40)	5
Belgium (Ultratop 50 Flanders)	15
Belgium (Ultratop 50 Wallonia)	36
Canada Top Singles (RPM)	2
Finland (Soumen Virallinen)	22
Germany (GfK)	7
Ireland (IRMA)	5
Netherlands (Dutch Top 40)	5
Netherlands (Single Top 100)	5
New Zealand (Listener)	1
South Africa (Springbok Radio)	5
Spain (Promusicae)	6
Sweden (Kvällstoppen)	9
Sweden (Tio i Topp)	5
UK Disc and Music Echo Top 50	1
UK Melody Maker Top 50	2
UK New Musical Express Top 30	2
UK Record Retailer Top 50	2
US Billboard Hot 100	1
US Cash Box Top 100	1

=== Certifications ===
Region	Certification	Certified units/sales
United Kingdom (BPI)	Silver	200,000^{‡}
^{‡} Sales+streaming figures based on certification alone.

== Other versions ==
The Jimi Hendrix Experience gave a dramatic performance of the song, at the Monterey Pop Festival in 1967: in the documentary Monterey Pop, Jimi Hendrix set his guitar on fire at the song's conclusion. Live recordings by Hendrix are found on several albums; more recently, the Monterey version is included on Voodoo Child: The Jimi Hendrix Collection (2001) and Live at Monterey (2007).

Also in 1967, the novelty team of Senator Bobby released a version of Wild Thing. Comedian Bill Minkin sang it in the verbal style of Democratic Senator Robert Kennedy, while a recording engineer is heard giving instructions. The single reached number 20 on the Billboard Hot 100. On the flip side, Minkin performs Wild Thing in an impression of Republican Senator Everett Dirksen.

Fancy, a 1970s pop group made up of session musicians produced by Mike Hurst, recorded the song. Described as a "deeply lascivious version .. with all the heavy breathing and suggestive orgasmic guitar and bass work", they were unable to release the song as a single in their native UK. In 1974, Big Tree Records issued it on a single in the US, where it reached number 14 and was certified Gold. It also peaked at number 31 in Australia.

In 1976, British comedy trio The Goodies performed the song in "The Goodies – Almost Live", an episode of their television series The Goodies. Their version included humorous variations on the original lyrics (for example, after the line "wild thing, hold me tight", they added "...not quite that tight"). Their version was released on the B-side of Nappy Love and included on The New Goodies LP.

The all-girl band the Runaways, that launched the careers of Joan Jett and Lita Ford, performed a hard rock rendition of the song, with various alterations in lyrics, as part of their Live in Japan album in 1977. The song became a signature song for The Runaways drummer, Sandy West, for her singing and showmanship.

In 1981, Siouxsie Sioux recorded the song with her second band the Creatures, adding new lyrics: "Wild thing, I think I hate you/but I wanna know for sure/so come on, hit me hard/I hate you": it was included on the EP Wild Things. It was described by critics as "Perhaps the most striking of those 7,500-odd licensed recordings ... on which [her] chilly multitracked vocals are accompanied only by ... tribal-sounding drums". David Cheal of the Financial Times argued that "It’s a version that taps into the earthy, elemental spirit of the song".

In 1984, the U.S. band X released a version as a non-album single. The Houston Press included this version as one of their "10 Greatest Versions" of the song. It was also included on the soundtrack of the feature film Major League as the entrance theme to Charlie Sheen's character Ricky "Wild Thing" Vaughn. Director David S. Ward said of this version, "I was listening to the recording of 'Wild Thing' — not the original one by the Troggs, but the one by X, and it was such a big sound, it sounded like a thousand people were singing it" and "I thought, this would be really interesting if people got so into this kid, this pitcher, that when he came into the game, they would stand up and sing 'Wild Thing'." Professional wrestlers Atsushi Onita and Jon Moxley also use this version as their entrance themes, with Moxley using it as a tribute to Onita.

In 1985 Jeff Beck recorded a cover during the recording sessions for the album Flash. It was released only as a promo single and never appeared on the album, but would later be featured on Beck's 1991 compilation album Beckology. After the track itself fades, it concludes with an excerpt from The Troggs Tapes.

In 1988, comedian Sam Kinison recorded a version of the song to close out his stand-up album Have You Seen Me Lately? The racy video, featuring actress and Playboy model Jessica Hahn got heavy airplay on MTV at the time. The song was nominated for a Grammy Award for best comedy recording.

The Swamp Thing animated series from 1991 has a theme song that parodies Wild Thing.

In 1993, the Australian band Divinyls recorded the song for the film Reckless Kelly. Released as a single on 14 March 1993, it peaked at No. 39 on the Australian Singles Chart.

American groove metal band Chimaira recorded a version of the song in 2011 as a non-album single release. The cover was created as a tribute to actor Charlie Sheen and references his acting role in the 1989 film Major League.

Black Honey contributed a cover of the song to the soundtrack of the Amazon Prime series My Lady Jane (2024).
