= Penny Valentine =

British music journalist (1943–2003)

- Valentine in 1967
- Born: Penelope Ann Valentine; 13 February 1943; London, England
- Died: 9 January 2003 (aged 59)
- Occupations: Journalist, presenter

Penelope Ann Valentine (13 February 1943 – 9 January 2003) was a British music journalist, rock critic, and occasional television personality.

== Biography ==
Penny Valentine was born in London, England, of Jewish and Italian ancestry. In 1959, she became a trainee reporter, first on the Uxbridge Post, and in the early 1960s on Boyfriend, a weekly magazine for teen girls. In 1964, she joined the staff of Disc, a weekly pop music magazine (later Disc and Music Echo), as a journalist and record reviewer, becoming for a time Britain's most influential reviewer of new pop singles. According to fellow journalist Richard Williams, "She was probably the first woman to write about pop music as though it really mattered." She loved soul music, and supported singers such as Aretha Franklin and Marvin Gaye before they became famous. In 1965 she also recorded the novelty single "I Want To Kiss Ringo Goodbye", which celebrates the Beatles' drummer Ringo Starr.

As a young woman, Valentine also wrote articles for a variety of publications on the "Swinging London" phenomenon. Chris Welch commented that she "was part of a social whirl of receptions, parties and night-clubbing that made Swinging London such fun". She also appeared regularly on Juke Box Jury in the mid-1960s.

In 1970, she left Disc to join a new magazine, Sounds, and in 1973 was hired by her friend Elton John to become the press officer for his record label, The Rocket Record Company. She also wrote for Record Mirror and Melody Maker and in the 1970s for the American rock magazine Creem. After a period working in New York City, she returned to London in 1975 to help launch another new magazine, Street Life, later joining Time Out, before leaving in 1980 to help found the more politically radical City Limits. She became active in a number of bodies, including Women in Media and the National Union of Journalists. After gaining a BA degree in film studies and English, she pursued a freelance career teaching and writing. With Vicki Wickham, she wrote a biography of Dusty Springfield entitled Dancing With Demons (2000).

Valentine died at the age of 59 in 2003 after suffering from cancer for some time.

== Bibliography ==
- With Vicki Wickham, Dancing with Demons: The Authorised Biography of Dusty Springfield, Hodder & Stoughton, 2000, ISBN 0-340-76673-5
