= Reg Presley =

British singer (1941–2013)

Background information
- Born: Reginald Maurice Ball; 12 June 1941; Andover, Hampshire, England
- Died: 4 February 2013 (aged 71) Andover, Hampshire, England
- Genres: Rock; pop
- Occupations: Singer; songwriter
- Instrument: Vocals
- Years active: 1960s–2012
- Formerly of: The Troggs

Reginald Maurice Ball (12 June 1941 – 4 February 2013), known professionally as Reg Presley, was an English singer and songwriter. He was the lead singer of the 1960s rock and roll band the Troggs, whose hits included "Wild Thing" (#1 on the Hot 100 on 30 July – 6 August 1966) and "With a Girl Like You" (#1 on the UK Official Singles Chart on 4–11 August 1966). He wrote the song "Love Is All Around", which was featured in the films Four Weddings and a Funeral and Love Actually.

== Personal life ==
Reginald Maurice Ball was born in Andover, Hampshire, in 1941. His father was a milkman, later a bus driver, and his mother ran a cafe. He left school at the age of fifteen. He joined the building trade on leaving school and became a bricklayer. He gave up this job when the Troggs' song "Wild Thing" entered the top ten in the United Kingdom music charts in 1966.

== Career ==
=== The Troggs ===
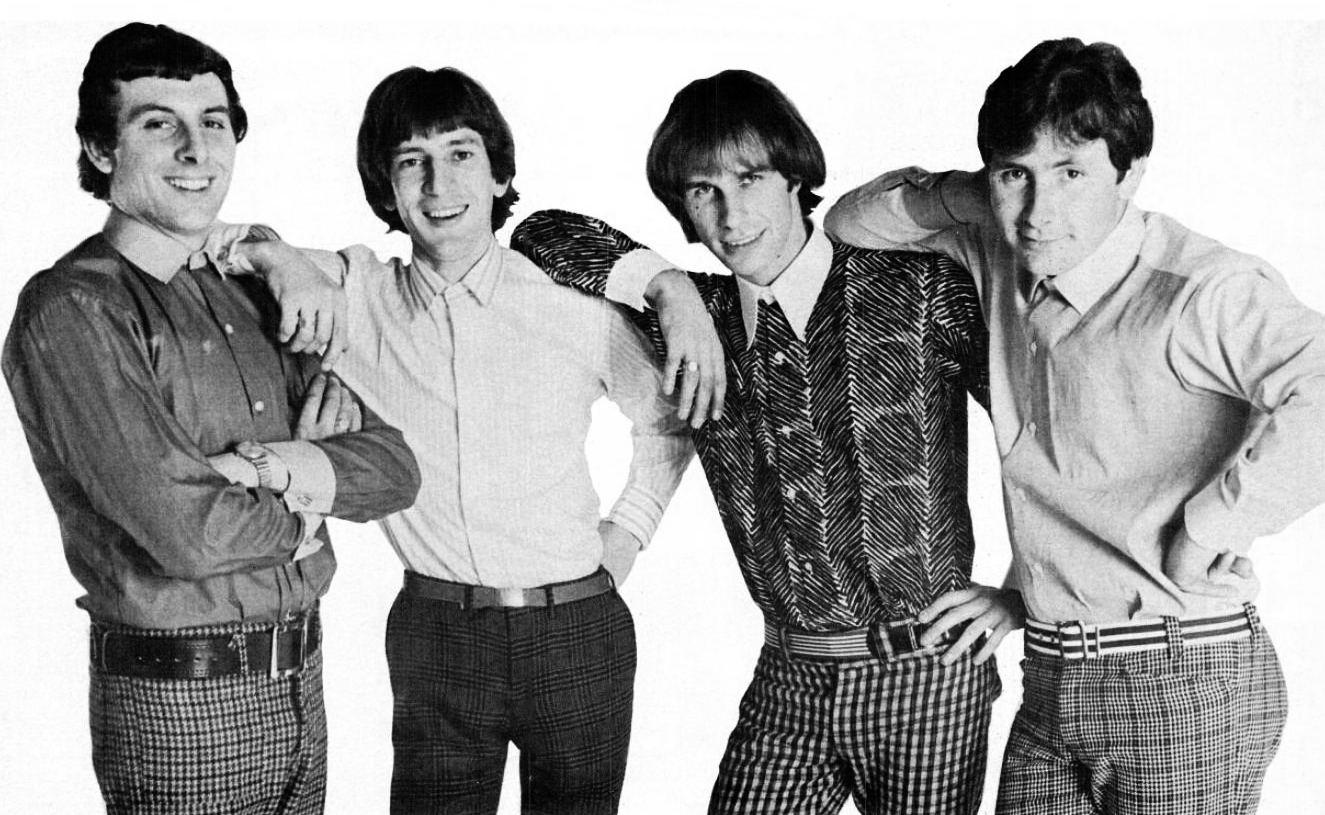
The Troggs in 1966. Left to right: Pete Staples, Ronnie Bond, Chris Britton and Reg Presley.

His first band was a skiffle group he formed with friend Howard Mansfield, with Mansfield on lead vocals and Reg on bass guitar. When Mansfield left, he moved to lead vocalist, and soon after Chris Britton joined on guitar, Pete Staples on bass, and Ronnie Bond on drums, and the group changed their name to The Troglodytes, and the classic lineup was formed. As the Troglodytes, they won a Battle of the Bands talent contest in Oxford in 1965, and sent a demo tape to the rock entrepreneur Larry Page, who shortened their name to the Troggs.

Presley, whose real name was Reginald Ball, was given his stage name in 1965 by the New Musical Express journalist and publicist Keith Altham as a joke. Larry Page asked the New Musical Express journalist Keith Altham for help in finding a better stage name for the lead singer. In order to get media attention, Altham suggested altering Ball's surname to Presley and the new name was listed alongside those of the other Troggs members in the NME's next issue. This led to Page being confronted by Ball, because he had forgotten to inform him of the name change, and Ball thought that he had been replaced in the group.

He kept at his occupation of a bricklayer, until "Wild Thing" reached the top 10 on the UK Singles Chart in 1966. It reached No. 2 in the UK, and No. 1 in the US, selling five million copies. Presley wrote the hits "With a Girl Like You", "I Can't Control Myself" and "Love Is All Around". Wet Wet Wet's 1994 cover of the latter 1967 song stayed at No. 1 in the UK Singles Chart for fifteen weeks. Presley was in the Troggs until 2012, when he announced his retirement from the music industry after suffering from a number of strokes. Presley's departure left only guitarist Chris Britton from the original Troggs lineup still remaining in the group. Britton is still in the Troggs as of 2023.

=== The Corporation and paranormal interests ===
In 1988, Presley formed The Corporation with Tony Crane, Clem Curtis, Mike Pender, and Brian Poole, who all were the lead singers of other pop groups during the 1960s: The Merseybeats, The Foundations, The Searchers, and Brian Poole and The Tremeloes, in the same order as the members names were listed. They recorded one single: Ain't Nothing But a House Party, that had its instrumental as the B-side. The song was released as a 7" single, and an extended mix, also with the instrumental as the B-side, was released as a 12" single.

Presley used the musical royalties he made from the Troggs' records and the royalties he made from the Wet Wet Wet cover to fund research on subjects such as alien spacecraft, lost civilisations, alchemy, and crop circles, and outlined his findings in his own penned book Wild Things They Don't Tell Us, published in October 2002. His interest in the paranormal began in 1990 when he walked into a crop circle at Alton Barnes in Marlborough, Wiltshire. Presley claimed to have seen fourteen UFOs in his life.

== Health problems and death ==
In December 2011, Presley was hospitalised in Winchester, Hampshire, with what was suspected to be a stroke. He was also suffering from pneumonia and fluid around the heart. Presley had suffered a major stroke about a year before. His wife said he first began to feel ill while performing in Germany on 3 December 2011 and had got progressively worse. "Doctors think he has had another stroke. He's not very well and I have no idea how long he'll be in hospital", she said. The following month, Presley announced he had been diagnosed with lung cancer and therefore decided to retire from the music industry. Just over a year later, on 4 February 2013, Presley died from this cancer and, according to Altham, "a succession of recent strokes". Presley was cremated at Basingstoke Crematorium, Hampshire.

A blue plaque in his memory was unveiled in Andover High Street on 31 July 2016, marking where the Troggs used to practice.

== Influence and legacy ==
Presley's music has influenced Iggy Pop and won praise from Bob Dylan. The rock critic Lester Bangs called the Troggs the "godfathers of punk" and compared Presley to Marcel Proust. Presley appears as a character in Steve Erickson's novel These Dreams of You (2012).
