= Page One Records =

1960s UK record label

Page One Records, established in 1966, was the UK independent record label, owned by the producer/manager, Larry Page.

They were involved in a court case in July 1967 with The Troggs.

The label, which was co-founded by Page and Dick James, released hits from The Troggs, Vanity Fare and Plastic Penny, as well as numerous failed attempts by Page himself to obtain his own hit record. In the US, the label was distributed by Bell Records.

As the label faded, Page went on to found Penny Farthing Records.

== See also ==
- Lists of record labels
