= Larry Page (singer) =

English pop singer and record producer (1936–2024)

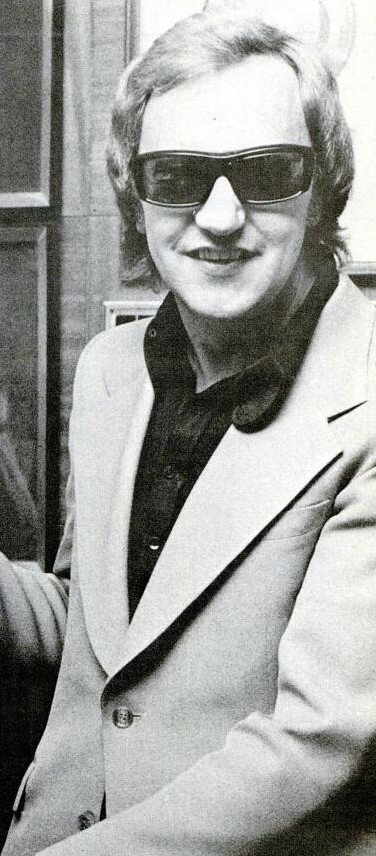
- Page in 1972
- Born: Arthur Leonard Davies; 9 November 1936; Hayes, Middlesex, England
- Died: 19 April 2024 (aged 87); Avoca, New South Wales, Australia
- Occupations: Singer; record producer; manager; record label founder

Arthur Leonard Davies (9 November 1936 – 19 April 2024), known professionally as Larry Page, was an English pop singer and record producer, primarily from the late 1950s until the early 1970s and briefly in the 1990s.

== Biography ==
Leonard Davies was born in Hayes, Hillingdon, Middlesex in 1936. After changing his name to Larry Page, in honour of Larry Parks, the star of The Jolson Story (1946), the teenager began a recording career as a singer.

Page tried to magnify his fame through the wearing of unusually large spectacles, as "Larry Page the Teenage Rage". The title was originally coined by Jack Bentley, the showbusiness correspondent from The Sunday Pictorial. He toured the United Kingdom with Cliff Richard and appeared at top venues, including the Royal Albert Hall. He was a regular on television programmes such as Six-Five Special and Thank Your Lucky Stars.

Page later became a successful manager, record producer and record-label owner. Much of his producer/manager success centred on his efforts with the Kinks and the Troggs, and his ownership of Page One Records and Penny Farthing Records. He produced such hits as "Wild Thing" along with all the other hits by the Troggs. Apart from the Troggs and the Kinks, the Larry Page Orchestra gave Jimmy Page (later of Led Zeppelin) some early exposure when he played on Kinky Music. In June 1967, the British music magazine NME reported that Page's bid to retain his former 10% interest in the Kinks had been dismissed by London's High Court.

Page was the producer on Daniel Boone's charting single "Beautiful Sunday". In 1972, Page was also involved in producing a song for Chelsea F.C. The song, "Blue is the Colour", is still played at the end of home matches.

As of the 2000s, Page lived in Avoca Beach, New South Wales, Australia. He died there on 18 April 2024, at the age of 87.

== Discography ==
The Larry Page Orchestra

- Kinky Music (1965)
- Executive Suite (1967)
- From Larry with Love (1968)
- Instrumentally Yours (1969)
- Presenting the Larry Page Orchestra (1969)
- This Is Larry Page (1970)
- Their Melodies Together (1973)
- Their Melodies Together Again (1974)
- Rampage (1976)
- Erotic Soul (1977)
- Skin Heat (1978)
- Imagine (1979)
- John Paul George Ringo (1996)
- Night Cruising (1998)

== See also ==
- The Kinks' 1965 US tour
