= The Tremeloes discography =

- Studio albums: 15
- EPs: 3
- Live albums: 1
- Compilation albums: 16
- Singles: 52

This is the discography of English beat group the Tremeloes, including with Brian Poole.

== Albums ==
=== Studio albums ===
| Title | Album details | Peak chart positions | | | |
| Title | Album details | UK | FIN | US | ZIM |
|---|---|---|---|---|---|
Brian Poole and the Tremeloes releases
| Big Big Hits of '62 | Released: April 1963; Label: Ace of Clubs; Formats: LP | — | — | — | — |
| Twist and Shout | Released: September 1963; Label: Decca; Formats: LP | — | — | — | — |
| It's About Time | Released: April 1965; Label: Decca; Formats: LP | — | — | — | — |
| Brian Poole Is Here! | Released: November 1965; Label: Audio Fidelity; Formats: LP; North America release | — | — | — | — |
The Tremeloes releases
| Here Come the Tremeloes | Released: 19 May 1967; Label: CBS, Epic; Formats: LP, MC, 8-track; Released in North America as Here Comes My Baby | 15 | 4 | 119 | — |
| Even the Bad Times Are Good / Silence Is Golden | Released: October 1967; Label: Epic; Formats: LP, 8-track; North America release | — | — | — | — |
| Alan, Dave, Rick and Chip | Released: 15 December 1967; Label: CBS; Formats: LP, MC, 8-track | — | 3 | — | — |
| Suddenly You Love Me | Released: March 1968; Label: Epic; Formats: LP, 4-track, 8-track; North America release | — | — | — | — |
| World Explosion! | Released: July 1968; Label: Epic; Formats: LP, 4-track; North America release | — | — | — | — |
| Master | Released: November 1970; Label: CBS; Formats: LP, MC | — | — | — | — |
| Shiner | Released: November 1974; Label: DJM; Formats: LP | — | — | — | — |
| Don't Let the Music Die (as Space) | Released: June 1975; Label: DJM; Formats: LP, MC | — | — | — | — |
| Greatest Hits | Released: December 1981; Label: Pickwick; Formats: LP, MC; Contains re-recording of hits | — | — | — | — |
| Million Sellers | Released: 1988; Label: Qualitel; Formats: CD, LP, MC; Contains re-recording of hits | — | — | — | 10 |
| May Morning | Released: November 2000; Label: Castle Music; Formats: CD; Unreleased soundtrack album from 1970 | — | — | — | — |
"—" denotes releases that did not chart or were not released in that territory.

=== Live albums ===
| Title | Album details |
|---|---|
| Live in Cabaret | Released: October 1969; Label: CBS; Formats: LP |

=== Compilation albums ===
| Title | Album details |
|---|---|
| Greatest Hits | Released: 1970; Label: CBS; Formats: LP, MC, 8-track |
| Reach Out for the Tremeloes | Released: 1973; Label: Embassy; Formats: LP, MC |
| Twist and Shout | Released: May 1982; Label: Decca; Formats: LP |
| As It Happened | Released: 1983; Label: CBS; Formats: LP, MC |
| The Ultimate Collection | Released: 1990; Label: Castle Communications; Formats: CD, 2xLP, MC |
| Good Day Sunshine: Singles A's & B's | Released: December 1999; Label: Sequel; Formats: 2xCD |
| Here Come the Tremeloes: The Complete 1967 Sessions | Released: July 2000; Label: Sequel; Formats: 2xCD |
| Suddenly You See Me: The Complete 1968 Sessions | Released: July 2000; Label: Sequel; Formats: 2xCD |
| The Very Best of the Tremeloes | Released: July 2002; Label: Sanctuary; Formats: CD |
| Good Times: The Ultimate Collection | Released: September 2002; Label: Castle Music; Formats: 2xCD |
| BBC Sessions | Released: 7 June 2004; Label: Castle Music; Formats: 2xCD |
| Here Comes My Baby – The Ultimate Collection | Released: 6 December 2004; Label: Sanctuary; Formats: 3xCD |
| Silence Is Golden – The Very Best of the Tremeloes | Released: 2006; Label: Sanctuary; Formats: 2xCD |
| Live at the BBC 1964–67 | Released: 2 December 2013; Label: BGO; Formats: CD |
| Gold | Released: 17 January 2020; Label: Crimson; Formats: 3xCD, LP |
| The Complete CBS Recordings 1966–72 | Released: 28 August 2020; Label: Grapefruit; Formats: 6xCD |

== EPs ==
| Title | EP details |
|---|---|
| Brian Poole and the Tremeloes | Released: May 1964; Label: Decca; Formats: 7" |
| Time Is on My Side | Released: March 1965; Label: Decca; Formats: 7" |
| My Little Lady | Released: November 1968; Label: CBS; Formats: 7" |

== Singles ==
| Title | Year | Peak chart positions | | | | | | | | | |
| Title | Year | UK | AUS | BE (WA) | GER | IRE | NL | NOR | NZ | US | ZIM |
|---|---|---|---|---|---|---|---|---|---|---|---|
Brian Poole and the Tremeloes releases
| "Twist Little Sister" b/w "Lost Love" | 1962 | — | — | — | — | — | — | — | — | — | — |
| "Blue" b/w "That Ain't Right" | 1962 | — | — | — | — | — | — | — | — | — | — |
| "A Very Good Year for Girls" b/w "Meet Me Where We Used to Meet" | 1963 | — | — | — | — | — | — | — | — | — | — |
| "Keep On Dancing" b/w "Run Back Home" | 1963 | — | — | — | — | — | — | — | — | — | — |
| "Twist and Shout" b/w "We Know" | 1963 | 4 | — | 38 | 10 | 3 | — | — | 4 | — | — |
| "Do You Love Me" b/w "Why Can't You Love Me" | 1963 | 1 | 19 | — | — | 1 | — | 5 | 1 | — | — |
| "I Can Dance" b/w "Are You Loving Me at All" | 1963 | 31 | 24 | — | — | — | — | — | — | — | — |
| "Candy Man" b/w "I Wish I Could Dance" | 1964 | 6 | 18 | — | — | 8 | — | — | — | — | — |
| "Someone, Someone" b/w "Till the End of Time" | 1964 | 2 | 17 | — | — | 2 | — | 5 | 5 | 97 | — |
| "Twelve Steps to Love" b/w "Don't Cry" | 1964 | 32 | 84 | — | — | — | — | — | — | — | — |
| "Three Bells" b/w "Tell Me How You Care" | 1964 | 17 | 29 | — | — | — | — | — | — | — | — |
| "After Awhile" b/w "You Know" | 1965 | — | — | — | — | — | — | — | — | — | — |
| "I Want Candy" b/w "Love Me Baby" | 1965 | 25 | 81 | — | — | — | — | — | — | — | — |
| "Good Lovin'" b/w "Could It Be You?" | 1965 | — | 98 | — | — | — | — | — | — | — | — |
The Tremeloes releases
| "Blessed" b/w "The Right Time" | 1966 | — | — | — | — | — | — | — | — | — | — |
| "Good Day Sunshine" b/w "What a State I'm In" | 1966 | — | — | — | — | — | — | — | — | — | — |
| "Here Comes My Baby" b/w "Gentleman of Pleasure" | 1967 | 4 | 47 | — | 14 | 8 | 16 | — | 14 | 13 | — |
| "Silence Is Golden" b/w "Let Your Hair Hang Down" | 1967 | 1 | 5 | 34 | 8 | 1 | 4 | 1 | 1 | 11 | 1 |
| "Even the Bad Times Are Good" b/w "Jenny's Alright" | 1967 | 4 | 46 | 8 | 18 | 7 | 7 | — | 2 | 36 | 1 |
| "Be Mine" b/w "Suddenly Winter" | 1967 | 39 | — | — | — | — | — | — | — | — | 17 |
| "Suddenly You Love Me" b/w "As You Are" | 1968 | 6 | 20 | 43 | — 35 | 9 | — | — | 6 | 44 | 7 |
| "Helule Helule" b/w "Girl from Nowhere" | 1968 | 14 | 29 | 46 | 20 | 16 | 26 | — | 13 | 122 | 13 |
| "My Little Lady" b/w "All the World to Me" | 1968 | 6 | 51 | 2 | 3 | 1 | 3 | 5 | 1 | 127 | 2 |
| "I'm Gonna Try" (Note: "I'm Gonna Try" was only released as a single in Continental Europe and Israel.) b/w "Girl from Nowhere" | 1968 | — | — | — | — | — | — | — | — | — | — |
| "I Shall Be Released" b/w "I Miss My Baby" | 1968 | 29 | 47 | — | — | — | — | — | — | — | — |
| "Hello World" b/w "Up, Down, All Around" | 1969 | 14 | — | — | — | — | — | — | 20 | — | — |
| "Once on a Sunday Morning" b/w "Fa La La, La La, La Le" | 1969 | — | — | — | — | — | 27 | — | — | — | 17 |
| "(Call Me) Number One" b/w "Instant Whip" | 1969 | 2 | 27 | 22 | 3 | 2 | 19 | 4 | 4 | — | 3 |
| "By the Way" b/w "Breakheart Motel" | 1970 | 35 | — | — | — | — | — | — | 18 | — | — |
| "Me and My Life" b/w "Try Me" | 1970 | 4 | — | 46 | 6 | 2 | 33 | — | — | — | 6 |
| "Right Wheel, Left Hammer, Sham" b/w "Take It Easy" | 1971 | 46 | — | — | 31 | — | 32 | — | — | — | — |
| "Hello Buddy" b/w "My Woman" | 1971 | 32 | — | — | 16 | — | 36 | — | 15 | — | — |
| "Too Late (To Be Saved)" b/w "If You Ever" | 1971 | — | — | — | 33 | — | — | — | — | — | 13 |
| "I Like It That Way" b/w "Wakamaker" | 1972 | — | — | 49 | 49 | — | 9 | — | — | — | — |
| "Blue Suede Tie" b/w "Yodel Ay" | 1972 | — | — | 48 | 38 | — | — | — | — | — | — |
| "Ride On" b/w "Hands Off" | 1973 | — | — | — | 16 | — | — | — | — | — | — |
| "Make or Break" (as the Trems) b/w "Movin' On" | 1973 | — | — | — | — | — | — | — | — | — | — |
| "You Can't Touch Sue" (as the Trems) (Note: "You Can't Touch Sue" was only released as a single in Continental Europe.) b/w "Story for the Boys" | 1973 | — | — | — | — | — | — | — | — | — | — |
| "Do I Love You" b/w "Witchcraft" | 1974 | — | — | — | — | — | — | — | — | — | — |
| "Say O.K. (Say Ole You Love Me)" (Note: "Say O.K. (Say Ole You Love Me)" was only released as a single in Continental Europe.) b/w "Pinky" | 1974 | — | — | — | — | — | — | — | — | — | — |
| "Good Time Band" b/w "Hard Woman" | 1974 | — | — | — | 43 | — | — | — | — | — | — |
| "Someone Someone" b/w "My Friend Delaney" | 1975 | — | — | — | — | — | — | — | — | — | — |
| "Rocking Circus" (as Space) b/w "Don't Let the Music Die" | 1975 | — | — | — | — | — | — | — | — | — | — |
| "Be Boppin' Boogie" b/w "Ascot Cowboys" | 1975 | — | — | — | — | — | — | — | — | — | — |
| "Ging Gang Goolie" (Note: "Ging Gang Goolie" was only released as a single in Germany.) b/w "Lonely Robot" | 1978 | — | — | — | — | — | — | — | — | — | — |
| "Lonely Nights" (Note: "Lonely Nights" was only released as a single in Benelux and Germany.) b/w "Groover" | 1978 | — | — | — | — | — | — | — | — | — | — |
| "Lights of the Port Royal" b/w "Silas" | 1980 | — | — | — | — | — | — | — | — | — | — |
| "Tremolodies" b/w "I Let M Best Friend Down" | 1981 | — | — | — | — | — | — | — | — | — | — |
| "Words" b/w "I Will Return" | 1983 | 91 | — | — | — | — | — | — | — | — | 1 |
| "Angel of the Morning" b/w "Am I Dreaming" | 1987 | — | — | — | — | — | — | — | — | — | — |
| "Lean On My Baby" (Note: "Lean On My Baby" was only released as a single in the Netherlands.) b/w "My Little Lady" | 1988 | — | — | — | — | — | — | — | — | — | — |
| "Farewell & Goodbye" (Note: "Farewell & Goodbye" was only released as a single in Germany.) b/w "The Rising Sun" | 1992 | — | — | — | — | — | — | — | — | — | — |
"—" denotes releases that did not chart or were not released in that territory.
