= (Call Me) Number One =

1969 single by the Tremeloes

- Cover of the single released in Germany

Single by the Tremeloes
- B-side: "Instant Whip"
- Released: 17 October 1969
- Genre: Psychedelic pop; pop rock
- Length: 3:45
- Label: CBS
- Songwriter(s): Alan Blakley; Len "Chip" Hawkes
- Producer(s): Mike Smith

The Tremeloes singles chronology
"Once on a Sunday Morning" (1969)	"(Call Me) Number One" (1969)	"By the Way" (1970)

"(Call Me) Number One" is a song by British group the Tremeloes, released as a single in October 1969. It peaked at number two on the UK Singles Chart.

== Background and release ==
The Tremeloes had success in the early/mid 1960s with beat songs such as their versions of "Twist and Shout" and "Do You Love Me". Following the departure of lead singer Brian Poole in 1966, the group's music changed to producing pop records, perhaps better defined as sunshine pop, and success continued with further hits such as "Silence Is Golden" and "Even the Bad Times Are Good". However, by the late 1960s, the group wanted to move away from this style of pop. They released a cover of Bob Dylan's "I Shall Be Released", but following its relative commercial failure (only just a top-thirty hit), they reverted to their trusted pop with the top-twenty hit "Hello World". However, following the failure of their next single "Once on a Sunday Morning", which didn't make the UK charts, the Tremeloes took this as a sign that the public had also grown tired of their current musical style. They therefore decided to change musical direction, and released "(Call Me) Number One", a heavier psychedelic pop song, as a single.

At the time, member Alan Blakley said that they had "come to hate all those happy records, even the ones that sold hundreds and hundreds of thousands", with Len "Chip" Hawkes adding that they had gotten "into the carefree, singalong thing and we found the more it worked for us, the harder it became to get out of the rut". After writing "(Call Me) Number One", the Tremeloes played it to some friends, who were "universal in their praise, but equally sure that it was the wrong type of song for the group". The success of the song was a surprise for the group, given their recent releases, with Blakley saying that "people have bought it thinking it was a good record, and not because it was the Tremeloes".

"(Call Me) Number One" was their first single written solely by members of the group (Blakley and Hawkes), and it was released with the B-side "Instant Whip", written by the other two members (Dave Munden and Rick Westwood). Whilst it did not reach the top of the UK Singles Chart, nor the charts published by the New Musical Express and Melody Maker (on all three, it was held off the top by the Archies' "Sugar, Sugar"), it did reach the top of one UK newspaper chart, Top Pops & Music Now, for two weeks. Elsewhere, the song topped the charts in South Africa.

== Reception ==
Reviewing for Melody Maker, Chris Welch wrote that "as one of Britain's most respected "straight" groups, they are ready to take risks with material they believe in musically as well as commercially, an approach shared by the Hollies [who had recently released "He Ain't Heavy, He's My Brother"]". For New Musical Express, John Wells described the song as having "an enveloping heavy rock backing, with muted trumpets and deep brass and towards the end there's an almost psychedelic instrumental passage. It struck me as being musically a big step forward for the boys but at the same time they've managed to retain their usual happy sound".

== Afterwards ==
Following the success of "(Call Me) Number One", the Tremeloes were offered a song called "Tomorrow Night", written with the group in mind by Jeff Christie. However, they said it was too poppy and not in the direction the group wanted to take following "(Call Me) Number One". The group heard another of Christie's songs, "Yellow River", and they immediately jumped it and wanted to record it. They had intentions of releasing it as a single, but instead, they decided to release the self-penned "By the Way" as their follow-up single, which failed to capitalise on their success, only peaking at number 35 on the UK Singles Chart. However, the Tremeloes would go on to have one final top-ten hit later in 1970 with "Me and My Life". Christie decided to form his own group entitled Christie, whose recording of "Yellow River" would go on to top the UK chart and become an international hit.

== Charts ==
Chart (1969–70)	Peak position
Australia (Go-Set)	22
Australia (Kent Music Report)	27
Austria (Ö3 Austria Top 40)	5
Belgium (Ultratop 50 Flanders)	9
Belgium (Ultratop 50 Wallonia)	22
Denmark (IFPI)	6
Germany (GfK)	3
Ireland (IRMA)	2
Malaysia (Radio Malaysia)	3
Netherlands (Dutch Top 40)	19
Netherlands (Single Top 100)	17
New Zealand (Listener)	4
Norway (VG-lista)	4
Rhodesia (Lyons Maid)	3
South Africa (Springbok Radio)	1
Sweden (Tio i Topp)	12
Switzerland (Schweizer Hitparade)	5
UK Singles (OCC)	2

== Personnel ==
- Dave Munden – lead vocals, drums (died 2020)
- Rick Westwood – vocals (during chorus), lead guitar
- Alan Blakley – vocals (during chorus), rhythm guitar (died 1996)
- Len Hawkes vocals (during chorus), bass guitar
