= List of Fab 40 number-one singles =

List of number-one singles on the Radio London weekly playlist

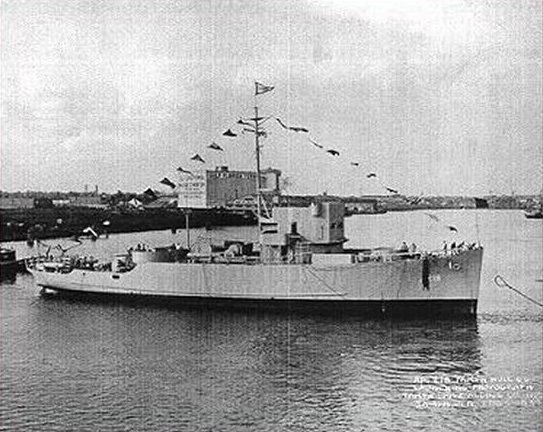
The USS Density (later renamed to MV Galaxy) was the vessel used to broadcast the pirate radio station Big L.

The Fab 40 (or Fab Forty) was the playlist for the station Wonderful Radio London. Also known as Big L, Wonderful Radio London was a pirate radio station that operated from the MV Galaxy about three-and-a-half miles out from the coast of Frinton-on-Sea, Essex. It was founded by American Don Pierson with a backing of around £500,000, and first "BROADCAST" shortly before Christmas 1964. The station is credited with introducing to Britain the contemporary hit radio style seen in the United States and the Fab 40 chart is said by Music Week to have been "influential". During its tenure, it had disc jockeys such as John Peel, Tony Blackburn and Kenny Everett. Based on airplay (not physical music sales) the chart was broadcast on Sunday afternoons. The station closed on 14 August 1967 when the Marine, &c., Broadcasting (Offences) Act 1967 came into effect, with the last Fab 40 chart show presented the previous week by Tommy Vance. Later, when an official chart had been established, rival charts would factor airplay into their charts.

The Fab 40 had a significantly higher turnover of singles than the Record Retailer chart; it had 118 different singles top the chart between 23 January 1965 and 12 August 1967 (by comparison Record Retailer had 53). Additionally, only one single spent three weeks at number one – The Beatles double A-side "Day Tripper" / "We Can Work It Out" – while on the Record Retailer chart, 23 singles spent at least three weeks at the top of the chart in the same period. On the Fab 40, the Beatles and the Rolling Stones each had eight number-ones and the Hollies had seven (six of which did not top the Retailer chart).

== Number-one singles ==
Key

† – The song did not reach number one on the Record Retailer chart which is considered by The Official Charts Company as the canonical source until 15 February 1969.
[nb #] – The song spent a week at number one where it shared the top spot with another song.

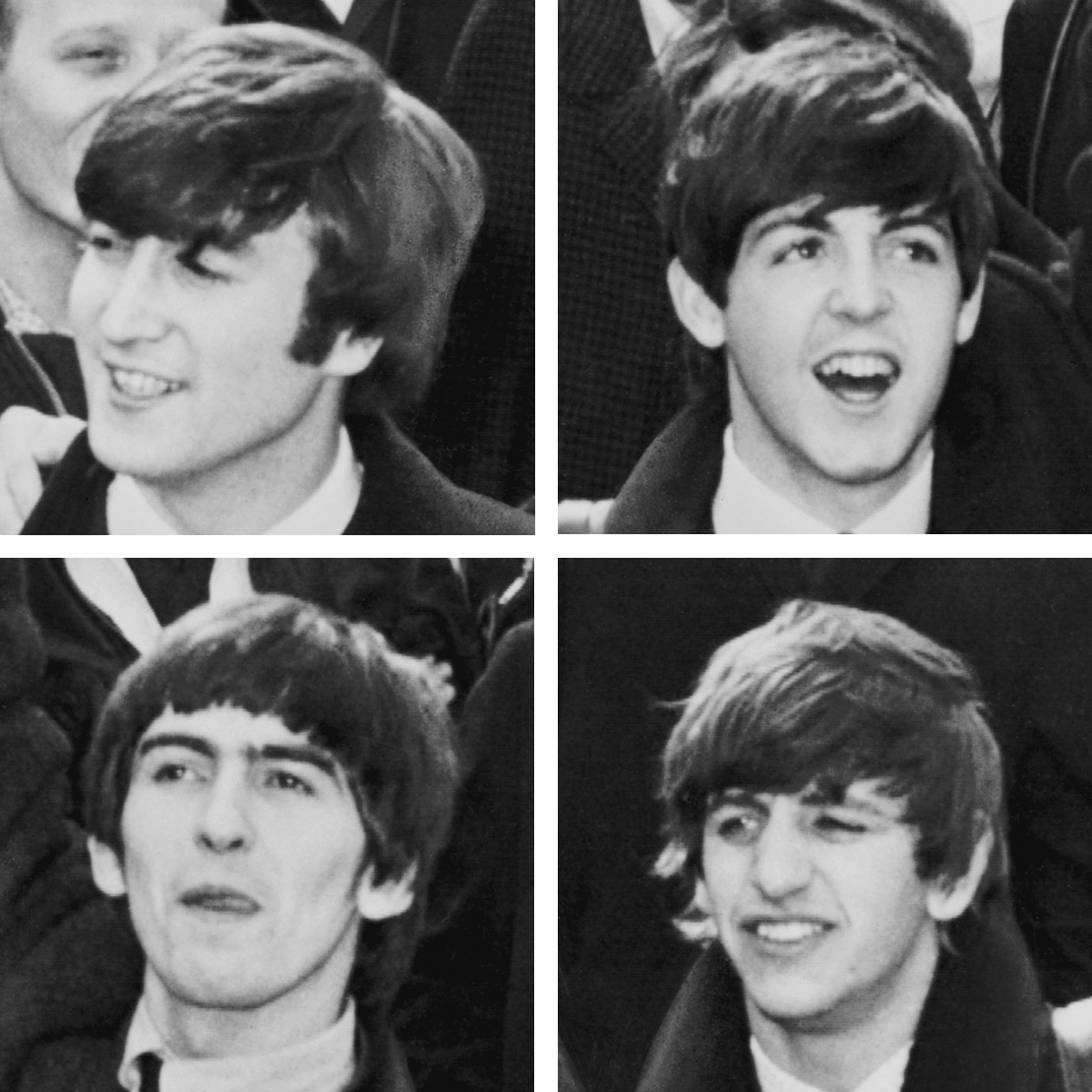
The Beatles had eight number-one singles on the Fab 40 chart and their double A-side "Day Tripper" / "We Can Work It Out" was the only single by any artist to spend more than two weeks at number one.

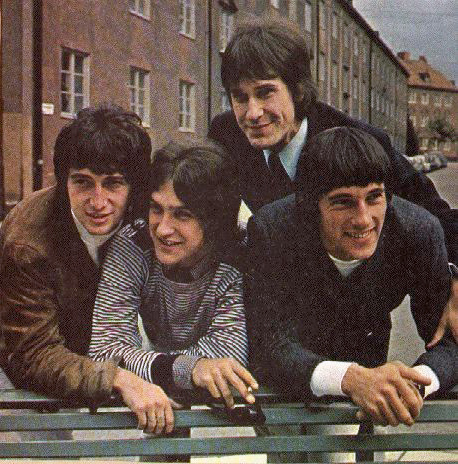
The Kinks had four number-one singles, three of which failed to top the canonical Record Retailer chart.

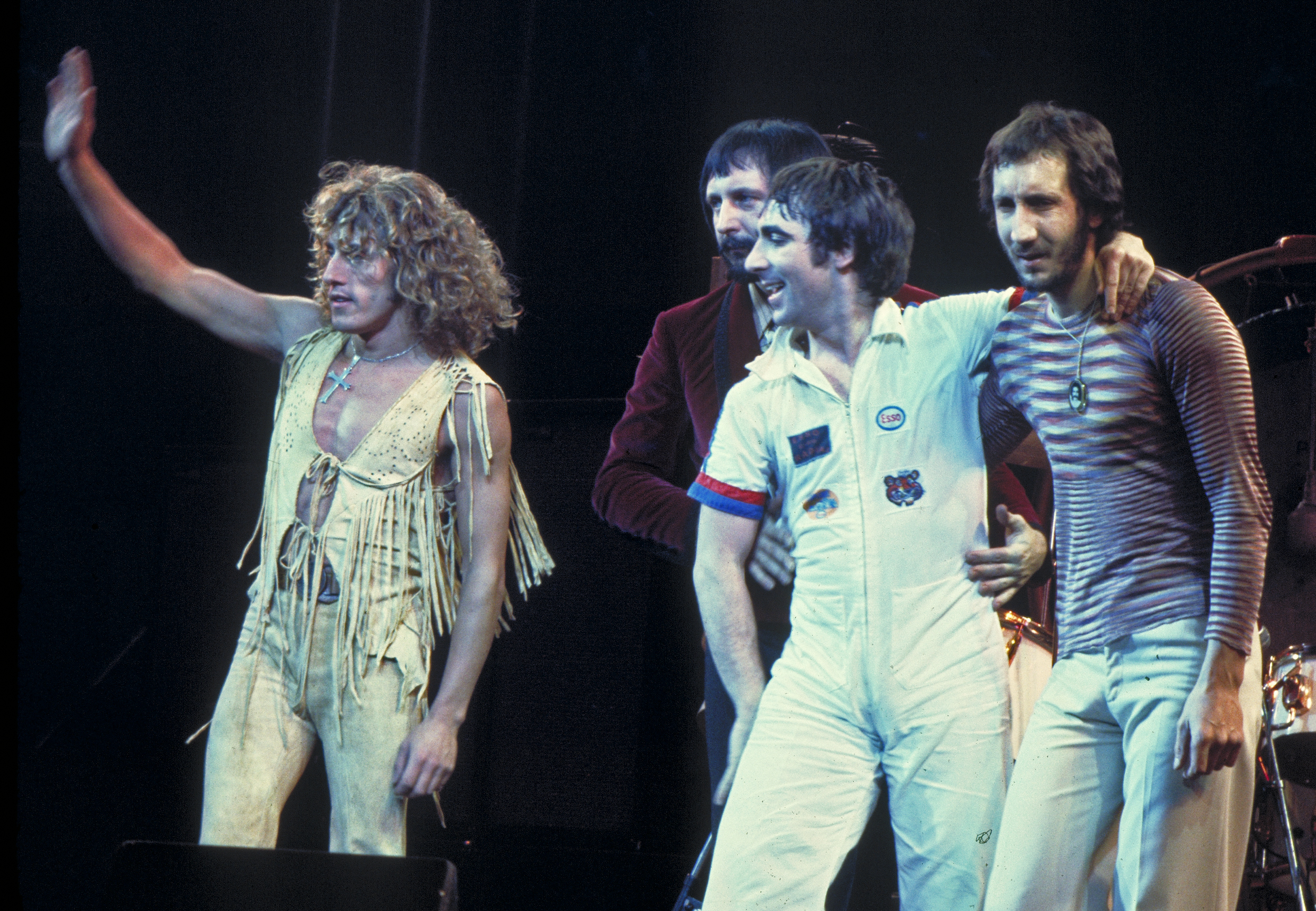
The Who had four number-one singles, none of which topped the Retailer chart.

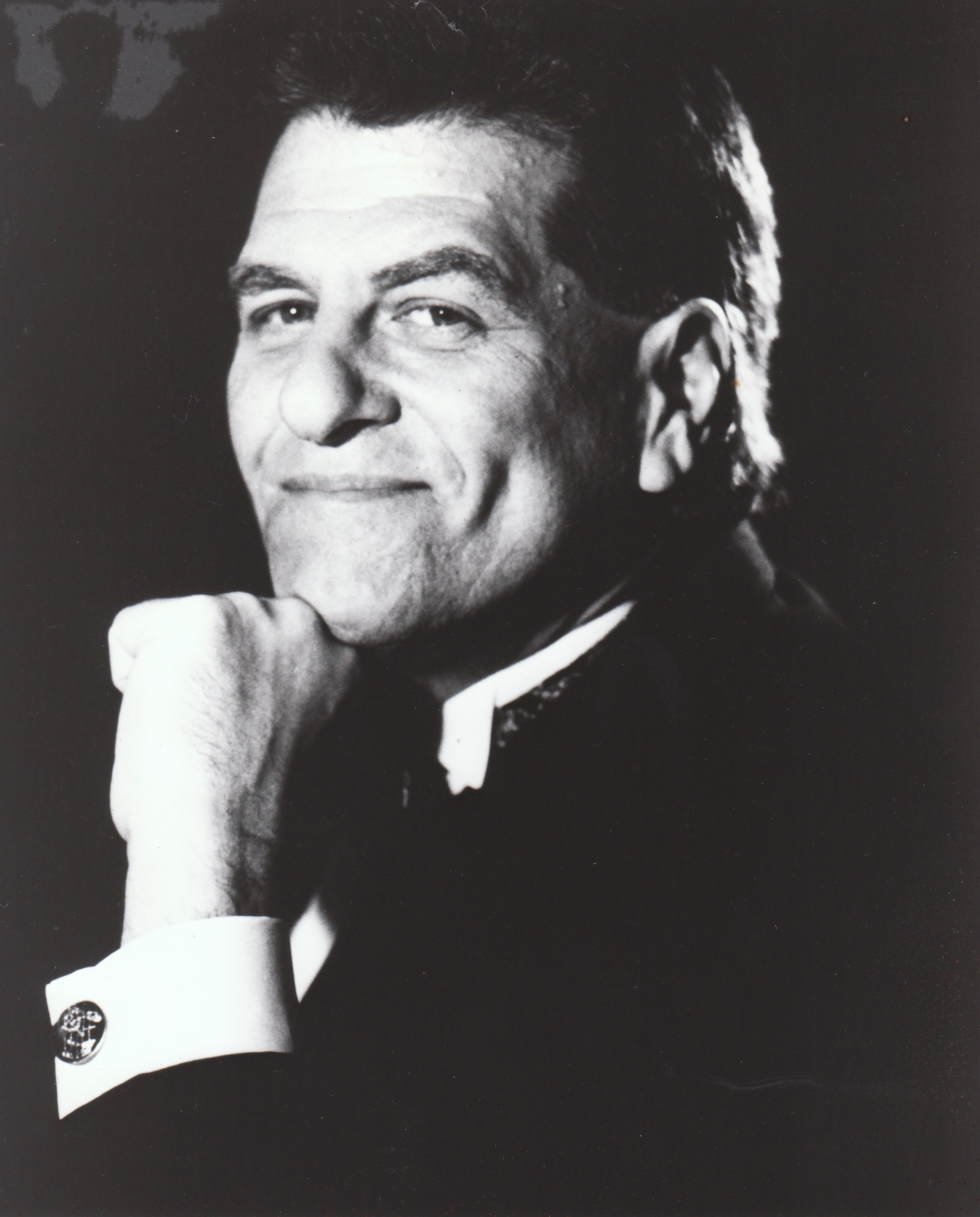
Len Barry had two singles enter the Retailer chart peaking at number three and number ten. Both singles topped the Fab 40 chart.

No.	Artist	Single	Reached number one (Note: Date is week-ending date of the Sunday – Saturday chart week)	Weeks at number one	Refs
1965
1	The Moody Blues	"Go Now"	23 January 1965	2	
2	The Righteous Brothers	"You've Lost That Lovin' Feelin'"	6 February 1965	1	
3	Manfred Mann	"Come Tomorrow" †	13 February 1965	1	
4	The Kinks	"Tired of Waiting for You"	20 February 1965	1	
5	The Seekers	"I'll Never Find Another You"	27 February 1965	1	
6	Tom Jones	"It's Not Unusual"	6 March 1965	1	
7	Herman's Hermits	"Silhouettes" †	13 March 1965	1	
8	The Rolling Stones	"The Last Time"	20 March 1965	2	
9	Unit 4 + 2	"Concrete and Clay"	3 April 1965	1	
10	The Yardbirds	"For Your Love" †	10 April 1965	1	
11	The Beatles	"Ticket to Ride"	17 April 1965	2	
12	Roger Miller	"King of the Road"	1 May 1965	1	
13	The Animals	"Bring It On Home to Me" †	8 May 1965	1	
14	Bob Dylan	"Subterranean Homesick Blues" †	15 May 1965	1	
15	Herman's Hermits	"Wonderful World" †	22 May 1965	1	
16	Sandie Shaw	"Long Live Love"	29 May 1965	1	
17	The Rockin' Berries	"Poor Man's Son" †	5 June 1965	1	
18	Shirley Ellis	"The Clapping Song" †	12 June 1965	1	
19	The Hollies	"I'm Alive"	19 June 1965	1	
20	Gene Pitney	"Looking Thru The Eyes Of Love" †	26 June 1965	1	
21	The Rolling Stones	Got Live If You Want It! † (Note: This number-one record was not a single but a six-track extended play (EP). The release is described by Allmusic as a "five-track EP" as the first track, "We Want the Stones", is just a recording of a crowd chanting for the band before a concert. The second track, "Everybody Needs Somebody to Love", segues into the third track, "Pain in My Heart", after 35 seconds and is described as "inconsequential". The remaining three tracks, "Route 66", "I'm Moving On" and "I'm Alright" were re-recorded and featured on the US album that shared the same name as the British EP. Although the Fab 40's criteria for chart inclusion is not known or clearly defined, it was not until 1998 that the UK Singles Chart reduced the number of tracks allowed on a single from four to three.)	3 July 1965	1	
22	Peter and Gordon	"To Know Him Is to Love Him" †	10 July 1965	1	
23	The Byrds	"Mr. Tambourine Man" †	17 July 1965	1	
24	The Yardbirds	"Heart Full of Soul" †	24 July 1965	1	
25	The Beatles	"Help!"	31 July 1965	2	
26	The Animals	"We've Gotta Get out of This Place" †	14 August 1965	1	
27	Jonathan King	"Everyone's Gone to the Moon" †	21 August 1965	1	
28	Sonny & Cher	"I Got You Babe"	28 August 1965	1	
29	The Rolling Stones	"(I Can't Get No) Satisfaction"	4 September 1965	2	
30	Bob Dylan	"Like a Rolling Stone" †	18 September 1965	1	
31	The Hollies	"Look Through Any Window" †	25 September 1965	1	
32	Manfred Mann	"If You Gotta Go, Go Now" †	2 October 1965	2	
33	Sandie Shaw	"Message Understood" †	16 October 1965	1	
34	Hedgehoppers Anonymous	"It's Good News Week" †	23 October 1965	1	
35	Chris Andrews	"Yesterday Man" †	30 October 1965	1	
36	The Rolling Stones	"Get Off of My Cloud"	6 November 1965	2	
37	Len Barry	"1–2–3" †	20 November 1965	1	
38	The Who	"My Generation" †	27 November 1965	2	
39	The Beatles	"Day Tripper" / "We Can Work It Out"	11 December 1965	3	
1966
40	The Spencer Davis Group	"Keep On Running"	1 January 1966	1	
41	Herman's Hermits	"A Must to Avoid" †	8 January 1966	1	
42	The Kinks	"Till the End of the Day" †	15 January 1966	1	
43	Pinkerton's Assorted Colours	"Mirror Mirror" †	22 January 1966	1	
44	The Overlanders	"Michelle"	29 January 1966	2	
45	Len Barry	"Like a Baby" †	12 February 1966	1	
46	The Rolling Stones	"19th Nervous Breakdown" / "As Tears Go By" †	19 February 1966	2	
47	Small Faces	"Sha-La-La-La-Lee" †	5 March 1966	1	
48	The Hollies	"I Can't Let Go" †	12 March 1966	1	
49	The Yardbirds	"Shapes of Things" †	19 March 1966	2	
50	The Kinks	"Dedicated Follower of Fashion" †	2 April 1966	1	
51	The Spencer Davis Group	"Somebody Help Me"	9 April 1966	2	
52	Alan Price Set	"I Put a Spell on You" †	23 April 1966	1	
53	The Lovin' Spoonful	"Daydream" †	30 April 1966	1	
54	Manfred Mann	"Pretty Flamingo"	7 May 1966	1	
55	The Beach Boys	"Sloop John B" †	14 May 1966	1	
56	The Troggs	"Wild Thing" †	21 May 1966	1	
57	The Rolling Stones	"Paint It, Black"	28 May 1966	1	
58	The Mamas & the Papas	"Monday, Monday" †	4 June 1966	1	
59	The Animals	"Don't Bring Me Down" †	11 June 1966	1	
60	The Beatles	"Paperback Writer"	18 June 1966	1	
61	The Kinks	"Sunny Afternoon" †	25 June 1966	1	
62	Ike & Tina Turner	"River Deep – Mountain High" †	2 July 1966	1	
63	The Hollies	"Bus Stop" †	9 July 1966	1	
64	Georgie Fame and the Blue Flames	"Getaway"	16 July 1966	1	
65	Petula Clark	"I Couldn't Live Without Your Love" †	23 July 1966	1	
66	Los Bravos	"Black Is Black" †	30 July 1966	1	
67	The Troggs	"With a Girl Like You"	6 August 1966	1	
68	The Beatles	"Yellow Submarine" / "Eleanor Rigby"	13 August 1966	2	
69	Small Faces	"All or Nothing"	27 August 1966	1	
70	Roy Orbison	"Too Soon to Know" †	3 September 1966	1	
71	Cliff Bennett and the Rebel Rousers	"Got to Get You into My Life" †	10 September 1966	1	
72	Jim Reeves	"Distant Drums"	17 September 1966	1	
73	The Supremes	"You Can't Hurry Love" †	24 September 1966	1	
74	Dave Dee, Dozy, Beaky, Mick & Tich	"Bend It" †	1 October 1966	1	
75	The Who	"I'm a Boy" †	8 October 1966	1	
76	The Rolling Stones	"Have You Seen Your Mother, Baby, Standing in the Shadow?" †	15 October 1966	1	
77	The New Vaudeville Band	"Winchester Cathedral" †	22 October 1966	1	
78	Four Tops	"Reach Out I'll Be There"	29 October 1966	1	
79	The Hollies	"Stop! Stop! Stop!" †	5 November 1966	1	
80	The Beach Boys	"Good Vibrations"	12 November 1966	1	
81	Manfred Mann	"Semi-Detached, Suburban Mr. James" †	19 November 1966	1	
82	The Spencer Davis Group	"Gimme Some Lovin'" †	26 November 1966	1	
83	Tom Jones	"Green, Green Grass of Home"	3 December 1966	1	
84	Small Faces	"My Mind's Eye" †	10 December 1966	1	
85	The Seekers	"Morningtown Ride" †	17 December 1966	1	
86	Donovan	"Sunshine Superman" †	24 December 1966	1	
87	The Who	"Happy Jack" †	31 December 1966	1	
1967
88	Dave Dee, Dozy, Beaky, Mick & Tich	"Save Me" †	7 January 1967	1	
89	Cliff Richard and The Shadows	"In the Country" †	14 January 1967	1	
90	The Monkees	"I'm a Believer"	21 January 1967	1	
91	Cat Stevens	"Matthew and Son" †	28 January 1967	1	
92	The Rolling Stones	"Let's Spend the Night Together" / "Ruby Tuesday" †	4 February 1967	1	
93	Petula Clark	"This Is My Song"	11 February 1967	1	
94	The Beatles	"Penny Lane" / "Strawberry Fields Forever" †	18 February 1967	2	
95	The Hollies	"On a Carousel" †	4 March 1967	1	
96	The Casinos	"Then You Can Tell Me Goodbye" †	11 March 1967	1	
97	Dusty Springfield	"I'll Try Anything" †	18 March 1967	1	
98	Alan Price Set	"Simon Smith and the Amazing Dancing Bear" †	25 March 1967	1	
99	Nancy Sinatra and Frank Sinatra	"Somethin' Stupid"	1 April 1967	1	
100	Sandie Shaw	"Puppet on a String" / "Tell the Boys"	8 April 1967	1	
101	The Monkees	"A Little Bit Me, a Little Bit You" †	15 April 1967	1	
102	Manfred Mann	"Ha! Ha! Said the Clown" †	22 April 1967	1	
103	Warm Sounds	"Birds and Bees" †	29 April 1967	1	
104	Lulu	"The Boat That I Row" †	6 May 1967	1	
105	The Who	"Pictures of Lily" †	13 May 1967	1	
106	The Tremeloes	"Silence Is Golden"	20 May 1967	1 (Note: The Tremeloes' "Silence Is Golden" and the Kinks' "Waterloo Sunset" were classified jointly as number one on 20 May 1967. The following week "Waterloo Sunset" claimed the number-one spot outright.)	
107	The Kinks	"Waterloo Sunset" †	20 May 1967	2	
108	Procol Harum	"A Whiter Shade of Pale"	3 June 1967	1	
109	Engelbert Humperdinck	"There Goes My Everything" †	10 June 1967	1	
110	The Beatles	"A Day in the Life" †	17 June 1967	1	
111	The Hollies	"Carrie Anne" †	24 June 1967	1	
112	The Turtles	"She'd Rather Be With Me" †	1 July 1967	1	
113	The Beatles	"All You Need Is Love" / "Baby, You're a Rich Man"	8 July 1967	2	
114	Scott McKenzie	"San Francisco (Be Sure to Wear Flowers in Your Hair)"	22 July 1967	1	
115	The Monkees	"Pleasant Valley Sunday" †	29 July 1967	1	
116	Tom Jones	"I'll Never Fall in Love Again" †	5 August 1967	1	
117	The Beach Boys	"Heroes and Villains" †	12 August 1967	1 (Note: The Beach Boys' "Heroes and Villains" and the Tremeloes' "Even the Bad Times Are Good" were classified jointly as number one on 12 August 1967, which was the last chart compiled by Big L.)	
118	The Tremeloes	"Even the Bad Times Are Good" †	12 August 1967	1	
