= Len Hawkes =

English bass guitarist/vocalist (born 1945)

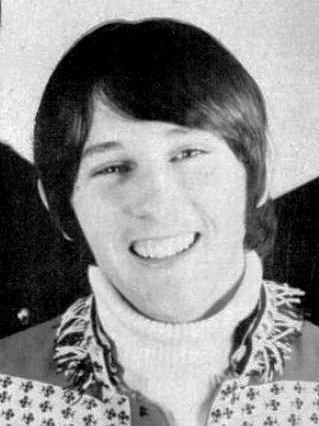
- Chip Hawkes in 1968
- Born: Leonard Donald Stanley Hawkes; 2 November 1945 (age 80)
- Other name: Chip Hawkes
- Spouse: Carol Dilworth (m. 1969)
- Children: 3, including Chesney
- Musical career
- Occupation: Musician
- Instruments: Bass; vocals
- Years active: 1960s–present
- Member of: The Tremeloes
- Formerly of: The Horizons, Class of '64

Leonard Donald Stanley "Chip" Hawkes (born 2 November 1945) is an English musician. He is best known for being a member of the Tremeloes and for being the father of Chesney Hawkes.

== Early life ==
Leonard Donald Stanley Hawkes was born on 2 November 1945. When he left school, he became a carpenter's apprentice, alongside which he would play local gigs; his nickname, Chip, was a consequence of him sometimes turning up to gigs still covered in wood shavings.

He formed a band called The Horizons, that featured Rod Evans as their lead vocalist. Evans would go on to form and front the band Deep Purple in 1968. The Horizons toured Hamburg, Germany during the early to mid 1960s.

== Career ==
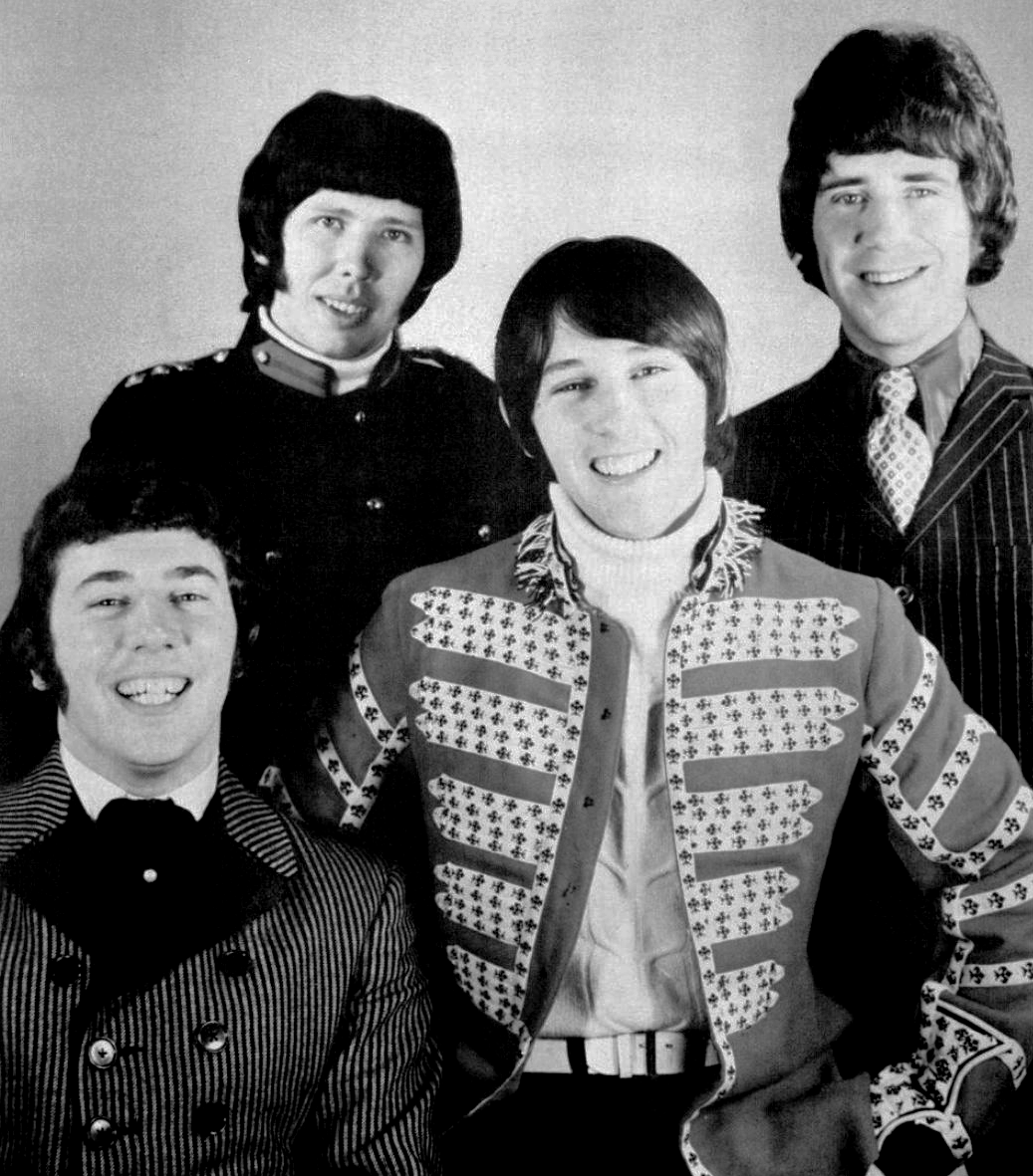
The Tremeloes in 1968, left to right: Dave Munden, Rick Westwood, Len Hawkes, Alan Blakley

In 1966, he joined The Tremeloes, previously Brian Poole and The Tremeloes before Brian Poole's and bassist Alan Howard's departure earlier that year, first as bassist, and then also as co-lead vocalist; while he was a member, the band entered the UK Singles Chart with "Here Comes My Baby" (No. 4), "Silence Is Golden" (No. 1), "Even the Bad Times are Good" (No. 4), "Be Mine" (No. 39), "Suddenly You Love Me" (No. 6), "Helule Helule" (No. 14), "My Little Lady" (No. 6), "I Shall Be Released" (No. 29), "Hello World" (No. 14), "(Call Me) Number One" (No. 2), "By the Way" (No. 35), "Me and My Life" (No. 4), and "Hello Buddy" (No. 32).

Hawkes left the band in 1974 after being injured in a car crash, before moving to Nashville, Tennessee, and releasing The Nashville Life in 1977, which flopped. He returned to England in 1979, reformed The Tremeloes, and entered the UK Singles Chart with "Words" (No. 90); he left in 1988 to manage Chesney's career. In 1992, he began touring as a solo artist.

In April 2004, at the request of the Animals, who were about to undertake their 40th anniversary tour, Hawkes was asked to form a band to tour with the Animals. Hawkes would then form a supergroup including Mick Avory (The Kinks), and Eric Haydock (The Hollies), who teamed up to perform as the Class of '64, also featuring guitarists, Telecaster Ted Tomlin and Graham Pollock. The band toured around the world and recorded an album of past band hits and a new single called "She's Not My Child".

In 2006, he, Brian Poole, and The Tremeloes reunited for the band's 40th anniversary tour. In 2017, Chip and Chesney undertook a joint tour.

== Personal life ==
=== Family ===
While promoting "Hello World" on The Golden Shot on 9 March 1969, he met the show's co-host Carol Dilworth, and married her later that year. Their relationship started poorly; Hawkes made an inane remark about Dilworth's mini-skirt, to which she responded by lecturing him on how popstars thought they could sleep with any women they wanted, and only agreed to a date several months later, following repeated phone calls to her from around the world, during the Tremeloes' hectic touring schedule.

The pair have had three children, who are all in the music business:

- Chesney Hawkes, who topped the UK Singles Chart in 1991 with "The One and Only"
- Jodie Hawkes, a drummer who has played for both Chesney and the Tremeloes,
- Keely Hawkes, the lead singer of the California-based alternative rock band Transister, who were active between 1995 and 1997, and included Gary Clark, formerly of Danny Wilson.

=== Allegations ===
In December 2015, it was reported that Hawkes and Tremeloes associate Richard Westwood would stand trial for the April 1968 indecent assault of a fifteen-year-old girl at a hotel in Chester. The trial caused Hawkes to have to cancel a tour of Australia with Brian Poole, and caused Chesney to be taunted at his concerts. In July 2016, it was reported that both parties had been acquitted after their accuser failed to enter evidence. In December 2015, while leaving Chester Crown Court, both he and Richard Westwood were assaulted by an intoxicated photographer, who had to be restrained by their barrister.

=== Health ===
In 2012, Hawkes was diagnosed with multiple myeloma, a type of bone marrow cancer, which caused him to shrink six inches after six vertebrae collapsed and require the use of a wheelchair, and for which he underwent a hematopoietic stem cell transplantation at the Royal Marsden Hospital, which caused his hair to fall out. His cancer relapsed during his assault trial, during which time he also suffered from depression. In November 2021, Chesney announced that due to Chip struggling with his health, he would be deputising for him during the Tremeloes' nationwide tour.

== Discography ==
The Tremeloes

(See The Tremeloes discography)

Solo

- The Nashville Life (1977)
