= Rick Westwood =

British pop/rock guitarist (born 1943)

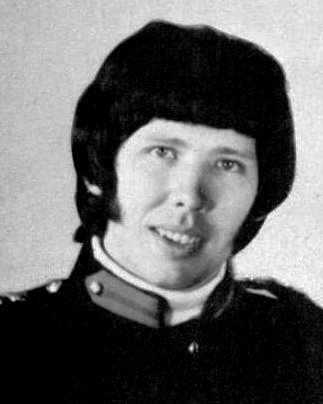
- Rick Westwood in 1968

Background information
- Also known as: Rick West
- Born: Richard Westwood; 7 May 1943 (age 83); London, England
- Occupation: Musician
- Instruments: Guitar, vocals
- Years active: 1950s–2012, 2019
- Formerly of: The Tremeloes, the Nashville Teens

Richard Westwood (born 7 May 1943), also known as Rick West or Ricky West, is a British retired musician, known for being a member of the Tremeloes from 1962 to 2012.

== Early life ==
Richard Westwood was born in Dagenham, East London on 7 May 1943. Westwood first learned how to play guitar at age nine, and got his first electric guitar at age 12 after seeing guitarist Bert Weedon play live.

He was in "Joe and the Teens" and "Tony Rivers & the Castaways" before he joined the Tremeloes.

== Career ==
Westwood joined Brian Poole and the Tremeloes (originally spelt correctly as “Tremoloes”) in 1962. On 31 December 1962, Decca Records chose the Tremeloes over the Beatles' audition, due to the Dagenham band living closer in comparison to the Liverpool band. They first entered the charts with a cover of Twist and Shout in 1963, the song went to number four in the UK.

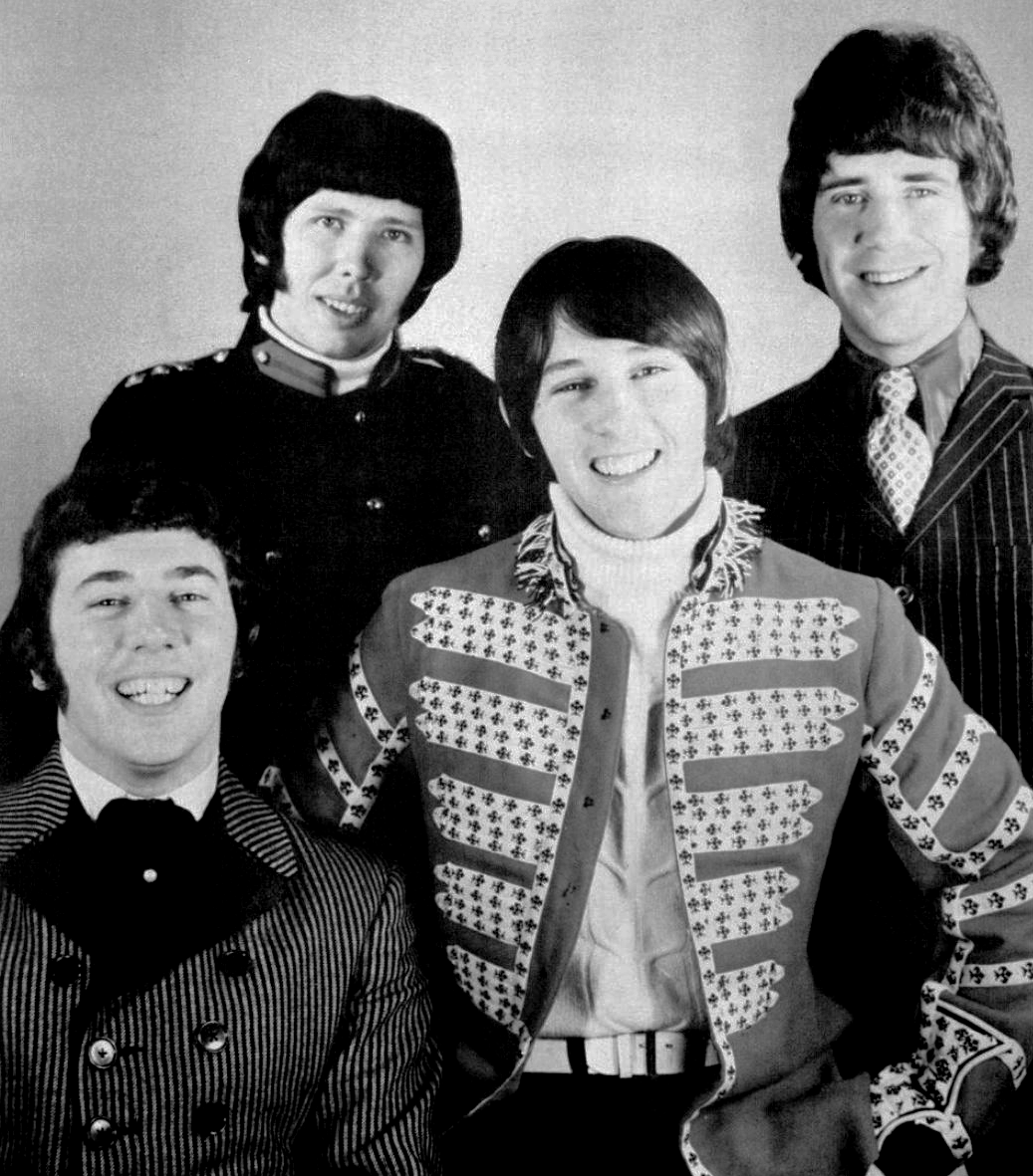
The Tremeloes in 1968, left to right: Dave Munden, Rick Westwood, Len Hawkes, Alan Blakley

They initially found success in the British Invasion era with lead singer Brian Poole, scoring a UK chart-topper in 1963 with "Do You Love Me", the song went to number one in three different countries (UK, Ireland, New Zealand). The band mostly covered rock and roll songs of the 1950s, and appeared on shows such as Ready Steady Go!, Top of the Pops, and the NME poll winners concerts in 1964. After Poole's departure in 1966, the band achieved further success as a four-piece with 13 top 40 hits on the UK Singles Chart between 1967 and 1971 including "Here Comes My Baby", "Even the Bad Times Are Good", "(Call Me) Number One", "Me and My Life" and their most successful single, "Silence Is Golden" (1967). Westwood played bass guitar on "Sweet Illusion", a 1973 UK chart hit penned and recorded by Junior Campbell of Marmalade. The song spent nine weeks on the Official Singles Chart and peaked at fifteen.

Westwood was applauded for his falsetto vocals on the Tremeloes' hit song "Silence Is Golden", however in the mid-1970s, Westwood started having troubles hearing, and briefly left the band to recover, replaced by Bob Benham during this time. Once he came back, he was unable to sing properly, including being completely unable to sing falsetto.

During 1977–1979, he played piano for the Nashville Teens, leaving to rejoin the Tremeloes as they reformed.

Westwood served as Tremeloes guitarist until 2012, when he announced his retirement after 54 years. His last concert was in Guildford on 1 November. The performance was a part of the “Sensational 60s Experience” tour. An exact reason for Westwood's retirement isn't clear, but his long history of hearing problems is suspected to be the reason. Westwood returned to the band with Hawkes for a small tour in 2019.

Jimmy Page of the Yardbirds and Led Zeppelin once noted Westwood as “one of the world’s best guitarists.”

== Allegations ==
In December 2015, it was reported that Westwood and Tremeloes member Chip Hawkes would stand trial for the April 1968 assault of a then-fifteen-year-old girl at a hotel in Chester. In December 2015, while leaving Chester Crown Court, both he and Hawkes were assaulted by an intoxicated photographer, who had to be restrained by their barrister.

In July 2016, it was reported that both parties had been acquitted after their accuser failed to enter evidence.

== Discography ==
(See The Tremeloes discography)
