= Candy Man (Roy Orbison song) =

1961 song by Roy Orbison

Single by Roy Orbison
- A-side: "Crying"
- Released: July 1961
- Recorded: June 27, 1961
- Studio: RCA Victor Studio B, Nashville, Tennessee
- Genre: Country; rock
- Length: 2:43
- Label: Monument
- Songwriters: Beverly Ross; Fred Neil
- Producer: Fred Foster

Roy Orbison singles chronology
"Running Scared (Roy Orbison song)" / "Love Hurts" (1961)	"Crying" / "Candy Man" (1961)	"Dream Baby (How Long Must I Dream)" / "The Actress" (1961)

"Candy Man" is a song by Roy Orbison, released as the B-side to his international hit "Crying" in July 1961. It was later covered by British beat group Brian Poole and the Tremeloes, becoming a top-ten hit in the UK.

== Writing and recording ==
"Candy Man" was written by Beverly Ross and Fred Neil. Ross was introduced to Neil at Cafe Wha? in Greenwich Village after being suggested by publishing company Hell and Rage that they co-write. Ross had had success as a co-writer of "Dim, Dim the Lights" for Bill Haley & His Comets and "Lollipop", which became an international hit for the Chordettes. Neil, on the other hand, was yet to have such success having been writing, and also recording, for the past few years. Knowing that Ross had written "Lollipop", Neil wanted to write a "candy song" with her. Determined to have another hit, Ross agreed and Neil proposed the title "Candy Man", saying that in New Orleans, where he was from, "the prostitutes, y’know, the hookers all have a pimp, and they call him their Candy Man". While Ross wasn't particularly pleased with this, she liked the title, so they wrote the song, "giving the title an affectionate, cute definition lyrically rather than the sleazy actual meaning it derived from".

After ending her contract with Hell and Rage, Ross went to friend Aaron Schroeder, who had recently started his own publishing company, January Music. After being played the song, Schroeder loved it and sent Ross and Neil into the studio to cut a demo. Schroeder then gave the recording to producer Fred Foster who then cut the song with country artist Roy Orbison. "Candy Man" was recorded at Nashville's RCA Victor Studio B on June 27, 1961, the day after the recording of "Crying". The song prominently features a harmonica, performed by the then-relatively unknown Charlie McCoy. The success of "Candy Man" helped boost McCoy's career.

== Release ==
"Candy Man" was released as the flip side to "Crying" in mid-July 1961, whilst Orbison's previous single, "Running Scared", was still in the charts. It was well-received, becoming Orbison's first B-side to make the US charts. It entered the Billboard Hot 100 in the first week of August, a week before the appearance of "Crying", and spent a total of fourteen weeks on the chart, reaching its peak at number 25 in the first week of November. It entered the Cash Box Top 100 in the third week of August, spent a total of sixteen weeks on the chart and achieved its peak at number 34 in the second week of September. "Candy Man" was not included on any of Orbison's studio albums, though it was included as a bonus track on subsequent reissues of Crying, and its first release on album was the compilation Roy Orbison's Greatest Hits in August 1962.

== Personnel ==
- Roy Orbison – vocals
- Harold Bradley – guitar
- Scotty Moore – guitar
- Boudleaux Bryant – guitar
- Bob Moore – bass
- Buddy Harman – drums
- Floyd Cramer – piano
- Charlie McCoy – harmonica
- Boots Randolph – saxophone

== Charts ==
Chart (1961)	Peak position
US Billboard Hot 100	25
US Cash Box Top 100	34

== Brian Poole and the Tremeloes version ==
"Candy Man"

Single by Brian Poole and the Tremeloes
- B-side: "I Wish I Could Dance"
- Released: January 24, 1964
- Recorded: January 8, 1964
- Studio: Decca Studios, London
- Genre: Beat
- Length: 2:24
- Label: Decca
- Songwriters: Beverly Ross; Fred Neil
- Producer: Mike Smith

Brian Poole and the Tremeloes singles chronology
"I Can Dance" (1963)	"Candy Man" (1964)	"Someone, Someone" (1964)

=== Background and release ===
Brian Poole and the Tremeloes were introduced to "Candy Man" by Roy Orbison whilst they were on tour with him in the UK. Whilst in the tour coach, Orbison began playing his version of the song (described by Poole as "slower and more bluesy"), before suddenly telling the group "you can make this a dancer", playing it more quickly. During the recording of the song at Decca Studios, the group wanted to have a "really dry snare drum sound" on "Candy Man", but due to the primitive multitrack recording equipment, this was hard to do. In order to get around this, they used advice give to them by Norman Petty about using a matchbox on some of the Crickets' songs. Tremeloes drummer Dave Munden taped a matchbox to his knee and drummed on it with one stick. Along with careful positioning of the microphone, this led to the desired sound effect.

The single was released in January 1964 with the B-side "I Wish I Could Dance", a cover of a 1963 song by Jimmy Soul. "Candy Man" became the group's third top-ten hit in the UK and spent a total of thirteen weeks on the Record Retailer Top 50 chart.

=== Critical reception ===
Don Nicholl for Disc wrote "there's something less dramatic about Poole and the Tremeloes this time out as they skip-beat to "Candy Man". After the weird, almost oriental twanging of the start the side provides a very catchy count. I think it has the mood for the moment, and it'll have customers chanting along in company". In Record Mirror, it was described as being "much more original than his [Poole's] last", with "a crashing guitar [that] leads the way, and Brian [singing] the vocal with more than a touch of R&B in the delivery".

=== Personnel ===
- Brian Poole – lead vocals
- Rick Westwood – lead guitar
- Alan Blakley – rhythm guitar
- Alan Howard – bass guitar
- Dave Munden – drums

=== Charts ===
Chart (1964)	Peak position
Australia (Kent Music Report)	18
Denmark (Danmarks Radio)	20
Ireland (IRMA)	8
Sweden (Tio i Topp)	15
UK Disc Top 30	7
UK Melody Maker Top 50	6
UK New Musical Express Top 30	8
UK Record Retailer Top 50	6

== Other cover versions ==
"Candy Man" has been covered by a number of artists, including Bobby Vee and the Ventures, Dion, the Hollies, Wanda Jackson and Brian Hyland. Co-writer Fred Neil released a version of the song on his 1965 debut solo album Bleecker & MacDougal and harmonicist Charlie McCoy covered it on his 1968 debut album The World of Charlie McCoy. However, the most successful other recording was by Mickey Gilley and Charly McClain, whose duet version peaked at number 5 on the Billboard Hot Country Singles and number 3 on the Canadian RPM 50 Country Singles chart in 1984.
