= Colin Chisholm (singer) =

Scottish singer

- Born: Colin Chisholm; 1 March 1953 (age 73); Edinburgh, Scotland
- Labels: Lightning Records, Chrysalis Records

Colin Chisholm is a Scottish singer from Edinburgh. He was a member of Bilbo who had a UK number 42 hit with "She's Gonna Win", and provided background vocals for the Runrig album The Big Wheel, including for the song "Hearthammer", which reached number 25 on the UK Singles Chart.

== Hearts Squad ==
Chisholm is a supporter of Heart of Midlothian F.C.. In 1986, he sang an updated version of "The Hearts Song", which was attributed to "Hearts Squad featuring Colin Chisholm" and charted at number 92 on the UK Singles Chart.

== The Voice UK ==
In 2013 Chisholm's daughter, Chloe, encouraged him to audition for the second series of The Voice UK. He passed his audition and defaulted to Team Tom, but was eliminated in the battle rounds.
