= Still Unwinding =

Studio album by The Rubettes
- Released: October 1978
- Length: 42:25
- Label: Polydor
- Producer: The Rubettes, Alan Blakley

The Rubettes chronology
Sometime In Oldchurch (1978)	Still Unwinding (1978)	Shangri'la (1992)

Still Unwinding is the seventh studio album by the English band The Rubettes. It was released on the Polydor label in October 1978, just seven months after their previous studio album Sometime In Oldchurch. It was the last album the band released in the 1970s - their next album Shangri'la, despite being recorded in 1979, was not released until 1992.

The album contained two singles, both released in advance of the album - "Goodbye Dolly Gray" and "Movin'".

In 1992, Dice Records (France) released the Rubettes' seventh and eighth albums (Still Unwinding and Shangri'la) as a double CD set.

== Track listing ==
Side 1

1. "Movin'" (Tony Thorpe) - 4:05
2. "No No Cherie" (John Richardson) - 3:20
3. "Still Unwinding" (John Richardson) - 4:36
4. "New York Tower" (Alan Williams) - 4:48
5. "San Andreas" (John Richardson) - 3:32

Side 2

1. "Goodbye Dolly Gray" (John Richardson, Alan Williams) - 4:14
2. "Truth Of The Matter" (Alan Williams) - 4:02
3. "When Hays Was Young" (Tony Thorpe) - 4:18
4. "Do You Ever Think Of Me" (Alan Williams) - 4:20
5. "Does It Gotta Be Rock'n'Roll (Tony Thorpe) - 5:10

== Singles ==
1. "Goodbye Dolly Gray" b/w "Great Be The Nation" - June 1978
2. "Movin'" b/w "San Andreas" - September 1978

== Personnel ==
- Mick Clarke
- John Richardson
- Tony Thorpe
- Alan Williams

== Publishers ==
- All tracks - Halcyon Music

== Production and credits ==
- Produced by The Rubettes with Alan Blakley for Gale
- All tracks published by Halcyon Music Limited
- Recorded at Le Chateau Studio France
- Mixed at Advision and DJM London
- Engineered by Mark J Wallis
- Mastered by Mike Brown at Pye, London
- String Arrangements by Gerry Shury
- Design Art Direction by Alwyn Clayden
- Photography by Chris Craske and Alwyn Clayden
