= Claudie Blakley =

British actress (born 1974)

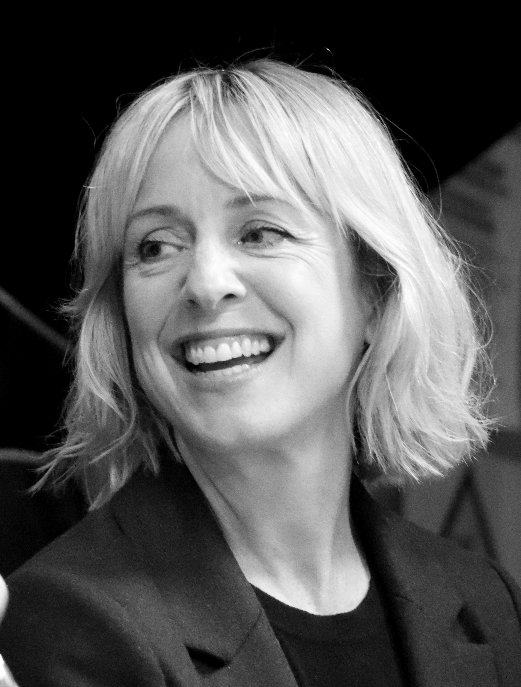
- Blakley at a fundraising event for Blockley Church, the location of the Father Brown series village Kembleford
- Born: 4 January 1974 (age 52); Easthampstead, Berkshire, England
- Other name: Claudia Blakley
- Education: Royal Central School of Speech and Drama
- Occupation: Actress
- Years active: 1995–present
- Spouse: Ross Anderson (m. 2022)
- Children: 1
- Parent(s): Alan Blakley; Lin Blakley

Claudie Blakley (born 4 January 1974) is an English actress. She trained at the Central School of Speech and Drama. In 1998, she won the Ian Charleson Award for her performance in The Seagull at the West Yorkshire Playhouse in Leeds. She is best known for her role as Emma Timmins in the BBC drama series Lark Rise to Candleford.

Other notable roles include Mabel Nesbitt in Robert Altman's Oscar-winning Gosford Park and Charlotte Lucas in Joe Wright's 2005 version of Pride and Prejudice. In the autumn of 2007, she was seen in the BBC serial Cranford as Martha.

In 2010, Blakley played the role of Cynthia Lennon in the BBC television production of Lennon Naked, a drama based on the period in the life of John Lennon from the years 1964 to 1971. In 2013, she appeared in the premiere of the play Chimerica.

== Family ==
Her father was Alan Blakley, a member of the 1960s pop band the Tremeloes. Her mother, Lin Blakley, is an actress known for her work on EastEnders playing Pam Coker from 2014 to 2016.

== Filmography ==
=== Film ===
Year	Title	Role	Notes
2000	Never Never	Jo's Friend	TV film
2000	A Christmas Carol	Ellie	TV film
2001	The War Bride	Rosie	
2001	The Cat's Meow	Didi	
2001	Gosford Park	The Hon. Mabel Nesbitt	
2003	Ready When You Are, Mr. McGill	Deirdre	TV film
2004	Dirty Filthy Love	Kathy	TV film
2005	Pride & Prejudice	Charlotte Lucas	
2006	Severance	Jill	
2006	London to Brighton	Tracey	
2006	Fear of Fanny	Nicky	TV film
2009	Bright Star	Maria Dilke	
2010	Lennon Naked	Cynthia Lennon	TV film
2011	The Night Watch	Nancy Carmichael	TV film
2011	National Theatre Live: The Cherry Orchard	Varya	
2012	National Theatre Live: The Comedy of Errors	Adriana	
2013	The Home Office	Barbra	TV film
2019	The Kid Who Would Be King	Riding Instructor	
2020	Do No Harm	Beth	Short film
2021	Boris Says	Nicky	Short film
2022	The House	Penelope	Voice
2022	A Moral Man	Helen	Short film

=== Television ===
Year	Title	Role	Notes
1996	No Bananas	Sandra	TV mini-series; 3 episodes
1997	Pirates	Gail Fleshy	Episode: "Gail Warning"
1997	Touching Evil	Mo Morrison	Episode: "Deadly Web"
1999	An Unsuitable Job for a Woman	Kirsty	Episode: "Living on Risk"
1999	The Bill	Alice Fitzgerald	Episode: "Denial"
2000–2002	Playing the Field	Kelly Powell	Series regular; 15 episodes
2001	Mr. Charity	Abi	Series regular; 6 episodes
2002–2003	Ed Stone Is Dead	Kate	Recurring role; 4 episodes
2004	He Knew He Was Right	Camilla French	TV mini-series; 4 episodes
2005	The Inspector Lynley Mysteries	Laetitia Gane	Episode: "The Seed of Cunning"
2006	Vital Signs	Jules Chapman	Series regular; 6 episodes
2007	Fallen Angel	Sally	Episode: "The Four Last Things"
2007–2009	Cranford	Martha	Series regular; 6 episodes
2008–2011	Lark Rise to Candleford	Emma Timmins	Series regular; 38 episodes
2009	Coming Up	Linda	Episode: "Foreign John"
2010	Agatha Christie's Marple	Philippa Pritchard	Episode: "The Blue Geranium"
2010	The Nativity	Anna the Prophetess	TV mini-series; 3 episodes
2011	New Tricks	Lisa Carlisle	Episode: "Half Life"
2013	What Remains	Patricia	TV mini-series; 4 episodes
2014	The Driver	Rosalind McKee	TV mini-series; 3 episodes
2015	Silent Witness	Louise Marsh	Episode: "Protection"
2015	Call the Midwife	Susan Robbins	Series 4: Episode 4
2015	Midsomer Murders	Claire Asher	Episode: "The Ballad of Midsomer County"
2016	Grantchester	Agatha Redmond	Recurring role; 5 episodes
2019–2021	Manhunt	Louise Sutton	Series regular; 7 episodes
2020	Flesh and Blood	Helen	TV mini-series; 4 episodes
2022	Man vs. Bee	Jess	TV mini-series; 5 episodes
2023–present	Father Brown	Mrs Devine	TV series; main
2025	Man vs. Baby	Jess	TV mini-series; 2 episodes
2026	Death in Paradise	Cara Smart	TV series; 1 episode

== Theatre ==
Year	Production	Role	Venue	Awards
1995	Rosencrantz and Guildenstern are Dead	Ophelia	Royal National Theatre	
1997	Peter Pan	Wendy	Royal National Theatre	
1998	The Seagull	Nina	West Yorkshire Playhouse	Ian Charleson Award – Best Actress 1998
1998	The Tempest	Miranda	West Yorkshire Playhouse	
1998	Present Laughter	Daphne	West Yorkshire Playhouse	
1999	Three Sisters	Masha	UK Tour	
2000	Billy and the Crab Lady	Kat	Soho Theatre	
2000	The Good Samaritan		Hampstead Theatre	
2002	Kosher Harry		Royal Court Theatre	
2003	The Lady from the Sea	Bollette	Almeida Theatre	
2003	Random	Bee	Royal Court Theatre	
2003	Alls Well That Ends Well	Helena	RSC (Stratford/London)	
2004	A Girl in a Car with a Man	Stella	Royal Court Theatre	
2005	Lear	Bodice	Sheffield Crucible Theatre	
2006	The Little Mermaid	Voice	Little Angel Theatre	
2006	Love and Money	Val/Debbie/4	Royal Exchange Theatre/Young Vic Theatre	
2007	Attempts on Her Life		Royal National Theatre	
2011	The Cherry Orchard	Varya	Royal National Theatre	
2011	Di and Viv and Rose	Rose	Hampstead Downstairs (Hampstead Theatre)	
2011	The Comedy of Errors	Adriana	Royal National Theatre	
2012	Macbeth	Lady Macbeth	Sheffield Crucible Theatre	
2013	Chimerica	Tessa Kendrick	Almeida Theatre	
2018	Consent	Kitty	Harold Pinter Theatre	
2019	Stories	Anna	Royal National Theatre	

== Radio ==
Year	Title	Role	Format	Notes
2000	Poppy Q	Anita	BBC Radio 3	
2002	Waterloo Bridge		BBC Radio 4	
2003	Ring Around the Bath	Alison	BBC Radio 4	
2004	Suspicious Minds		BBC Radio 4	
2012	Ruth Rendell – The Keys to the Street	Reader	BBC Radio 4	
2015	Agatha Christie – Miss Marple: The Case of the Perfect Maid	Lavinia Skinner	BBC Radio 4	
