= Lin Blakley =

English actress (b. 1947)

- Born: Linda E. Stevens; 1 July 1947 (age 79); Hillingdon, Middlesex, England
- Occupation: Actress
- Years active: 2003–present
- Notable work: EastEnders (2014–2019, 2022); Emmerdale (2023)
- Spouse: Alan Blakley (m. 1969; died 1996)
- Children: 2, including Claudie Blakley

Linda E. Blakley (née Stevens; born 1 July 1947) is an English actress, known for her roles as Pam Coker in the BBC soap opera EastEnders and as Georgia Sharma in the ITV soap opera Emmerdale.

== Career ==
In 2004, Blakley appeared in the film The Football Factory as the mother to Tamara (Sophie Linfield) and the stage productions of Effi's Burning and All My Sons as Effi and Kate respectively. The following year, she played Pam in Shaking Dreamland and Maureen Groves in Derailed. In 2006 and 2007, Blakley made guest appearances in the ITV drama Vital Signs and the BBC soap opera Doctors as Irene and Susan Staplehurst respectively. She also appeared in stage productions of Hay Fever and You Never Can Tell as Clara and Mrs. Clandon in 2006 and in the stage production of Puntill and his man Matti as Emma in 2007. In 2007, Blakley also appeared in short film, Gone Fishing as Emily and an episode of ITV police drama The Bill. The following year, Blakley starred in film Sydney Turtlebaum as Brenda, TV film The Children as Mel, a second episode of The Bill as Lorna Wickham and in a one-woman performance of Talking Heads.

In 2009, Blakley appeared in the film, Malice in Wonderland as Mrs. Jones; one episode of the ITV murder drama, Midsomer Murders as Janet Painter; one further episode of Doctors as Elaine Preston; as lead role, Ursula in the stage production of Vincent in Brixton; and in the stage production of The Entertainer as Phoebe. In the following year, she played Rachael Pennington in an episode of BBC medical drama, Holby City and played Marguerita in the stage production of The Miser. 2011 saw Blakley appear in two films: Late Bloomers as 'The Grey Panther' and Age of Heroes as Mrs. Shepard. She also appeared in an episode of Law & Order: UK as Jessica. In 2012, she appeared in: Rufus Stone, a short film, as Abigail; an episode of One Night, a BBC one-off four-part drama, as Joan Burton, and an episode of Hunted, a BBC drama, as Grandma Freeman. In 2013, she appeared as Barbara Kay in her third episode of Doctors and also starred in an episode of BBC fantasy-adventure drama Atlantis as Emily. In December 2017, she appeared as Mrs. Claus in a Kellogg’s Corn Flakes advert. The following month, Blakley appeared in BBC medical drama, Casualty, as cancer patient Maggie Coomes.

=== EastEnders ===
Blakley joined the cast of the BBC soap opera EastEnders as the wife of undertaker Les Coker (Roger Sloman), Pam, following his promotion to the regular cast. They would be setting up their funeral business in the fictional setting of Walford. Pam was billed as "a small woman with a big heart and an even bigger shoulder to cry on." Sloman stated how delighted he was to be working with Blakley and when commenting about her casting, Blakley said: "Being part of EastEnders is like going to work and being with another family. I'm really enjoying myself. Working with Roger has been wonderful from the word go, we have a laugh together and I feel like I have known him forever." Executive producer Dominic Treadwell-Collins also spoke about how he enjoyed watching the chemistry between Sloman and Blakley.

Blakley was written out of the show alongside Sloman in 2016 following the appointment of a new executive producer. A show insider commented, "Pam and Les have been a big part of the show over the past few months and with their current storyline, bosses felt that it was the right time for their characters to leave the Square. There is still plenty more drama to come from the Cokers before they leave Walford." Pam departed in the episode broadcast on 14 October. Blakely filmed two appearances for the soap in 2017 and Pam appeared in the episodes broadcast on 25 May and 22 June. Pam made another appearance in the soap on 5 February 2018. Blakely reprised the role for two episodes in 2019, and the character reappeared across two episodes in November. She then made another return in January 2022. In July 2025, Blakely revealed she was asked to reprise the role as Pam briefly ahead of a permanent return, an offer she declined due to scheduling restraints.

=== Emmerdale ===
In June 2023, it was announced Blakley would be joining the cast of the ITV soap opera Emmerdale, portraying Georgia Sharma, the mother of Jai Sharma, taking over the role from Trudie Goodwin.

== Personal life ==
Blakley married founding member of the 1960s pop band The Tremeloes, Alan Blakley in 1969. Two years later they had a daughter, Kirsten, who would become the lead singer in indie band named Little Spitfire, and in 1974 they had a second daughter, Claudie, who became an actress, notable for starring in Pride and Prejudice and Lark Rise to Candleford. Blakley is also Patron of Windlesham Drama Group and President of the Quince Players, Sunninghill.

== Filmography ==
Film
Year	Film	Role	Notes
2004	The Football Factory	Tamara's mother	
2004	Meat	June	Short film
2005	Shaking Dreamland	Pam	
2007	Gone Fishing	Emily	Short film
2008	Sydney Turtlebaum	Brenda	
2009	Malice in Wonderland	Mrs. Jones	
2011	Late Bloomers	The Grey Panther	
2011	Age of Heroes	Mrs. Shepard	
2012	Rufus Stone	Abigail	Short film
2016	Gozo	Jen	
2021	Boris Says	Mum	Short film

Television
Year	Title	Role	Notes
2005	Derailed	Maureen Groves	Television film
2006	Vital Signs	Irene	Series 1: Episode 5
2007	Doctors	Susan Staplehurst	Episode: "Words Unspoken"
2007	The Bill	Mrs. Harman	Episode: "485: Dead Man's Hand - Part 2"
2008	The Bill	Lorna Wickham	Episode: "Lifesaver"
2008	The Children	Mel	Miniseries; 2 episodes
2009	Doctors	Lorraine Preston	Episode: "Road to Recovery"
2009	Midsomer Murders	Janet Painter	Episode: "The Dogleg Murders"
2010	Holby City	Rachael Pennington	Episode: "Transgressions"
2011	Law & Order: UK	Jessica Vickery	Episode: "Tick Tock"
2012	One Night	Joan Burton	Episode: "Ted"
2012	Hunted	Grandma Freeman	Episode: "LB"
2013	Doctors	Barbara Kay	Episode: "Behind Closed Doors"
2014–2019, 2022	EastEnders	Pam Coker	Regular: 281 Episodes
2017	Doctors	Mary Crowe	Episode: "Wearing Purple"
2018	Casualty	Maggie Coomes	2 episodes
2018	Silent Witness	Mrs. Kennedy	Episodes: "Family: Parts 1 & 2"
2018	Ackley Bridge	Dianne Carter	Series 2: Episode 8
2019	Dark Money	Avril Allen	Episodes: "All That Glitters"... and "The Valiant One"
2021	Doctors	Alice Eliot	Episode: "This is Me"
2022	Vera	Sandra Mallon	Episode: "Tyger Tyger"
2023	Emmerdale	Georgia Sharma	Guest: 3 Episodes

== Stage ==
Year	Title	Role	Notes
2004	Effi's Burning	Effi	Lead role
2004	All My Sons	Kate	
2006	You Never Can Tell	Mrs. Clandon	
2006	Hay Fever	Clara	
2007	Puntill and his man Matti	Emma	
2008	Talking Heads	Lead	One Woman Performance
2009	Vincent in Brixton	Ursula	Lead role
2009	The Entertainer	Phoebe	
2010	The Miser	Marguerita	
2019	Other People's Money	Bea Sullivan	Southwark Playhouse
2019	Murder, Margaret and Me	Agatha Christie	UK Tour
