= She's Gonna Win =

Single by Bilbo
- Released: 1978
- Recorded: 1978
- Genre: Pop
- Label: Lightning
- Songwriter(s): Brian Spence
- Producer(s): Alan Blakley, Bilbo

"She's Gonna Win" is a song by Bilbo. It was released as a single in 1978, and reached No. 42 on the UK Singles Chart.
