= Bilbo (band) =

Scottish band

- Origin: Edinburgh
- Years active: 1972–1979
- Label: Lightning
- Members: Colin Chisholm (lead vocals); Jimmy Devlin (bass); Gordon Liddle (drums); Brian Spence (guitar); Gordon McIntosh (guitar)

Bilbo (shortened from Bilbo Baggins) was a band from Edinburgh who used to be the support act for the Bay City Rollers, sharing the controversial Tam Paton as manager. Their 1978 single, She's Gonna Win, peaked at No. 42 on the UK Singles Chart.

== Legal demise ==
In 2014 the UK's Intellectual Property Enterprise Court halted the band's attempt of a revival following an objection from the Saul Zaentz Company in the United States. SZC, which owns the rights to the works of J. R. R. Tolkien, had their complaint upheld because the band's name "did not differentiate it clearly enough from the famous hobbit Bilbo". The American company has often taken action against any perceived infraction of its Middle-earth franchise.

Guitarist Gordon McIntosh died on 26 February 2021.
