= Baby I Know =

Studio album by The Rubettes
- Released: April 1977
- Length: 38:33; 49:51 (with bonus tracks)
- Label: State/Polydor
- Producers: The Rubettes, Alan Blakley

The Rubettes chronology
Sign of the Times (1976)	Baby I Know (1977)	Sometime In Oldchurch (1978)

Baby I Know is the fifth studio album by the English band The Rubettes. It was released on the State Records label in April 1977.

The album contained five singles, three UK and two non-UK, including the band's two last charting UK singles - "Under One Roof" and "Baby I Know".

In 1992, Dice Records (France) released the Rubettes' fifth and sixth albums (Baby I Know and Sometime In Oldchurch) as a double CD set. In 2015, Caroline Records released the album Baby I Know, with three bonus tracks, as part of a box CD set of the Rubettes' first five studio albums.

== Track listing ==
Side 1

1. "Summertime Rock'n'Roll" (John Richardson, Alan Williams) - 3:02
2. "Baby I Know" (John Richardson, Alan Williams) - 4:18
3. "I'm In Love With You" (Mick Clarke) - 4:25
4. "Ooh La La" (John Richardson, Alan Williams) - 3:35
5. "Ladies Of Laredo" (John Richardson, Alan Williams, Mick Clarke, Tony Thorpe) - 5:38

Side 2

1. "Rock'n'Roll Lady" (John Richardson, Alan Williams) - 2:58
2. "Allez Oop" (John Richardson, Alan Williams) - 3:10
3. "I Wanna Be Loved" (John Richardson, Alan Williams) - 4:13
4. "Under One Roof" (John Richardson, Alan Williams) - 4:28
5. "Rock'n'Roll Queen" (D Branch, Peter Richardson) - 2:46

== 2015 CD bonus tracks ==
Rubettes:

11. "Ladies Of Laredo (Radio Version)" (John Richardson, Alan Williams, Mick Clarke, Tony Thorpe) - 4:22

Richards'n'Williams*:

12. "Married" (John Richardson, Alan Williams) - 4:02
13. "Who Makes The World Go Round?" (John Richardson, Alan Williams) - 2:54
*Produced by Alan Blakley

NB: Bonus track times taken from 2015 CD

== UK Singles ==
1. "Under One Roof" b/w "Sign Of The Times" - August 1976 - UK #40
2. "Baby I Know" b/w "Dancing In The Rain" - January 1977 - UK #10
3. "Ladies Of Laredo" b/w "I'm In Love With You" - April 1977

== Non-UK Singles ==
1. "Allez Oop" b/w "Rock'n'Roll Queen" - September 1976
2. "Ooh La La" b/w "Ladies Of Laredo" - March 1977

== Bonus Tracks Single ==
Bonus tracks 12 & 13 were also released together on the following single:
* "Married" b/w "Who Makes The World Go Round?" (as Richards'n'Williams) - February 1977

== Rubettes Personnel ==
- Mick Clarke
- John Richardson
- Tony Thorpe
- Alan Williams

== Publishers (Including Bonus Tracks) ==
- All titles (1–13, including bonus tracks) Arloval Music/Penny Farthing Music/Bucks Music except:

Track 3 (State Music)
Track 10 (Halcyon Music)
Track 11 (Belwin Music/Halcyon Music)

== Production & Credits ==
- Produced by The Rubettes with Alan Blakley for Gale
- Recorded at DJM Studios
- Strings on "Ladies of Laredo" arranged by Brian Rogers
- Engineer - Mark Jay Wallis
- Photography - Paul Canty (LFI)
- Sleeve Design - Bill Smith
- Artwork - Bob Reed
