= Here Comes My Baby (Cat Stevens song) =

1967 song

Song by Cat Stevens

from the album Matthew and Son
- Released: 10 March 1967
- Recorded: 1966
- Studio: Decca Studios, London
- Genre: Pop
- Length: 2:58
- Label: Deram
- Songwriter: Cat Stevens
- Producer: Mike Hurst

"Here Comes My Baby" is a song written by British singer-songwriter Cat Stevens. It is well known for being an international hit for the Tremeloes in 1967.

== Original version ==
In 1966, Stevens was discovered by Mike Hurst, formerly of the Springfields, who, after its split in 1963, decided to become a record producer. Whilst working for American producer Jim Economides, Hurst was introduced to Stevens who was trying to find a record label. He played "Here Comes My Baby", which Hurst thought was great and took it to Economides. However Economides disliked it. So Stevens was not signed. The company eventually went bankrupt and some time later, Stevens went to Hurst's house asking if he was still interested after being rejected by every record label in London. Stevens played him a new song, "I Love My Dog", which Hurst thought was "so unusual and really weird" and agreed to record it, with the song eventually being released as Stevens' debut single and to launch Decca Records' flagship label Deram. Meanwhile, "Here Comes My Baby" was shelved after "I Love My Dog" was seen as the stronger song to release as a single, and it was later included on Stevens' debut album Matthew and Son, released in March 1967.

Stevens' version notably features in the 1998 Wes Anderson film Rushmore along with "The Wind"; it was the first film he granted permission to use his songs after his conversion to Islam in the late 1970s.

== The Tremeloes version ==
"Here Comes My Baby"
- Cover of the single released in Germany

Single by the Tremeloes

from the album Here Come the Tremeloes
- B-side: "Gentleman of Pleasure"
- Released: 13 January 1967
- Genre: Pop rock
- Length: 2:48
- Label: CBS
- Songwriter: Cat Stevens
- Producer: Mike Smith

The Tremeloes singles chronology
"Good Day Sunshine" (1966)	"Here Comes My Baby" (1967)	"Silence Is Golden" (1967)

After Stevens shelved "Here Comes My Baby", it was recorded by beat group the Tremeloes. Their version was released several months prior to Stevens' album release, with it being released as a single in January 1967. It became the group's first top-ten hit since the departure of lead singer Brian Poole the year before, and their first top-twenty hit in the US.

The Tremeloes' version is slightly different, lyrically, from the original, with the beginning lyrics altered and the final verse left out. Stevens' lyrics begin "In the midnight moonlight I'll / Be walking a long and lonely mile", whereas in the Tremeloes' version, this has been changed to "In the midnight, moonlight hour / he's walking along that lonely, lonely mile". Most cover versions of the song sing this altered version. The group's version is also more upbeat than the original, with Stevens calling it "a complete Xmas-party take on an originally sad song". However, the success of the Tremeloes' version helped establish Stevens as a songwriter, who had his own top-ten hit with "Matthew and Son" in early 1967, and another of his songs, "The First Cut Is the Deepest", would become a hit for P. P. Arnold later in 1967.

=== Charts ===
==== Weekly charts ====
Chart (1967)	Peak position
Australia (Kent Music Report)	47
Canada Top Singles (RPM)	7
Germany (GfK)	14
Ireland (IRMA)	8
Netherlands (Dutch Top 40)	16
Netherlands (Single Top 100)	19
New Zealand (Listener)	14
Sweden (Tio i Topp)	9
UK Disc and Music Echo Top 50	4
UK Melody Maker Top 50	5
UK New Musical Express Top 30	4
UK Record Retailer Top 50	4
US Billboard Hot 100	13
US Cash Box Top 100	11

==== Year-end charts ====
Chart (1967)	Rank
US Billboard Hot 100	89
US (Joel Whitburn's Pop Annual)	128

=== Personnel ===
- Rick Westwood – vocals, lead guitar
- Alan Blakley – vocals, rhythm guitar (died 1996)
- Len Hawkes – vocals, bass guitar
- Dave Munden – vocals, drums (died 2020)

== Other cover versions and appearances ==
- In the early 1970s, the Memphis Goons recorded a version of the song that was released on their album Teenage BBQ in 1996 by Shangri-La Records. https://www.allmusic.com/album/teenage-bbq-mw0000594064
- In 1990, American indie rock band Yo La Tengo covered the song for their album Fakebook.
- In late 1999, American country music band the Mavericks released a cover of the song as a single in Europe. It peaked at number 82 on the UK Singles Chart and number 77 on the Dutch Single Top 100. It also peaked at number 42 on the US Billboard Hot Country Singles & Tracks chart and number 40 on the Canadian RPM Country chart.
- In 2010, a group of YouTubers under the name Sons of Admirals released a cover of the song as a single, which peaked at number 61 on the UK Singles Chart.
- In 2012, Canadian folk band Great Big Sea covered the song for their compilation album XX.
