= Riding on a Rainbow =

Studio album by The Rubettes
- Released: May 1992
- Length: 47:14
- Label: Dice Records
- Producer: Alan Williams

The Rubettes chronology
Shangri'La (1992)	Riding on a Rainbow (1992)	Making Love in the Rain (1995)

Riding on a Rainbow is a studio album by the English band The Rubettes. It is the band's ninth studio album, despite being released approximately six months before the eighth album Shangri'La. (Shangri'la was recorded in 1979 but remained unreleased until December 1992 - the Rubettes albums have therefore been numbered in recording, rather than release, order.)

== Track listing ==
1. "Here We Are" (Alan Williams) - 4:24
2. "So Underhanded" (John Richardson, Alan Williams) - 3:50
3. "Please Stay" (Burt Bacharach, Bob Hilliard) - 5:35
4. "I Want Your Love" (Alan Williams) - 4:05
5. "Last Time Around" (John Richardson, Alan Williams) - 5:19
6. "Oh So Lonely" (Alan Williams) - 2:22
7. "Photograph" (Alan Williams) - 4:24
8. "I Never Knew" (John Richardson, Alan Williams) - 4:10
9. "Sweet Soul Medley" (Live) - 13:05

1. "Sweet Soul Music" (Sam Cooke, Arthur Conley, Otis Redding)
2. "In the Midnight Hour" (Steve Cropper, Wilson Pickett)
3. "Soul Man" (Isaac Hayes, David Porter)
4. "Hold On, I'm Comin'" (Isaac Hayes, David Porter)
5. "634-5789 (Soulsville, U.S.A.)" (Eddie Floyd, Steve Cropper)
6. "When a Man Loves a Woman" (Calvin Lewis, Andrew Wright)
7. "My Girl" (Smokey Robinson, Ronald White)
8. "Respect" (Otis Redding)
9. "Uptight (Everything's Alright)" (Stevie Wonder, Sylvia Moy, Henry Crosby)
10. "Knock on Wood" (Eddie Floyd, Steve Cropper)
11. "Time Is Tight" (Booker T Jones, Al Jackson Jr, Donald "Duck" Dunn, Steve Cropper)
12. "Sweet Soul Music" (Sam Cooke, Arthur Conley, Otis Redding)

== Singles ==
1. "I Never Knew" (May 1992) b/w

- "I Want Your Love"
- "Riding on a Rainbow (Preview)"

2. "Oh So Lonely" (May 1993) b/w

- "Photograph"
- "Riding on a Rainbow (Preview)"

== Personnel ==
- Allan Williams
- Bill Hurd
- Alex Bines
- Trevor Holliday

== Publishers ==
- Tracks 1, 2, 4, 5, 6 & 7 - Jonalco Music
- Track 3 - Carlin Music
- Track 8 - Halcyon Music
- Track 9 - Rondor Music (Songs 1, 10, 11 & 12); Carlin Music (Song 2); Warner Chappell (Songs 3, 4, 5, 6 & 8); Jobete Music (Songs 7 & 9)

== Production and credits ==
- Produced by Alan Williams for Dice Records
- Engineered by Nigel Broad, Mark Bradley, Ian Richardson and Richard Bull
- Tracks 1–8: Recorded and mixed at The Village Recorders, Dagenham Village, Essex (UK); Track 9: Recorded live in Germany
- Photography - Top Hat Studios
- Cover Design & Original Artwork - Dean Barnett (copyright Alan Williams Entertainments Ltd)
- Finished Artwork - Geoff Hart
- Typesetting - GHA Design
- Special thanks to -

- Tony Atkins at Village for his indulgence
- Rainer Hass for making it possible second time around and
- For their additional vocal/instrumental colourations to Lyn Clare, Dave Cooke, Joe Gillingham, Jeff Daly, Nick Coler, Richard Bull, Antony Miles, Steve Curtis, Mick Clarke and John Richardson
