= Sometime In Oldchurch =

Studio album by The Rubettes
- Released: March 1978
- Length: 40:33
- Label: Polydor
- Producer: The Rubettes, Alan Blakley

The Rubettes chronology
Baby I Know (1977)	Sometime In Oldchurch (1978)	Still Unwinding (1978)

Sometime In Oldchurch is the sixth studio album by the English band The Rubettes. It was released on the Polydor Records label in March 1978.

Two singles were released from the album, both in advance: "Come On Over" and "Sometime In Oldchurch".

In 1992, Dice Records (France) released the Rubettes' fifth and sixth albums (Baby I Know and Sometime In Oldchurch) as a double CD set.

== Track listing ==
Side 1

1. "Great Be The Nation" (Alan Williams) - 5:20
2. "Come On Over" (Alan Williams) - 4:00
3. "Sometime In Oldchurch" (John Richardson, Alan Williams) - 4:35
4. "Top Of The World" (Tony Thorpe) - 6:16

Side 2

1. "Alimonia" (John Richardson) - 3:15
2. "Say What You Mean" (John Richardson) - 4:24
3. "Eva St. Clair" (Mike Gower, Alan Williams) - 5:40
4. "You Make It Hard" (Tony Thorpe) - 2:48
5. "Let Him Bleed" (John Richardson) - 4:15

== Singles ==
1. "Come On Over"/"Let Him Bleed" - October 1977
2. "Sometime In Oldchurch"/"Top Of The World" - February 1978

== Personnel ==
- Mick Clarke
- John Richardson
- Tony Thorpe
- Alan Williams

== Publishers ==
- All tracks Halcyon Music

== Production and credits ==
- Produced by The Rubettes with Alan Blakley for Gale
- Recorded at The Chateau, Herouville, France
- Engineer - Mark Jay Wallis
- Cover Artwork & Design - Jo Mirowski, Artwork WadeWood Associates
- Thanks to - Pete, Dud, Long John & Plunkett and Roy Farrant
- Special thanks to:

Rick Westwood, Carey Hunt for help with interpretation
Chris Lewis of DJM London and Audio Design for their help with our technical traumas

- Merci everso beaucoup to all at Le Chateau for making everything as easy and pleasant as possible
