= Shangri'la (Rubettes album) =

Studio album by The Rubettes
- Released: December 1992
- Recorded: March 1979
- Genre: Glam rock
- Length: 38:21
- Label: Dice Records
- Producer: The Rubettes, Alan Blakley

The Rubettes chronology
Still Unwinding (1978)	Shangri'la (1992)	Riding on a Rainbow (1992)

Shangri'la is a studio album by the English band The Rubettes. It was recorded in 1979, however was not released in its entirety until 1992, as part of the Rubettes "Albums 7 & 8" double CD set (with Still Unwinding). Three of the album's tracks featured on single releases in 1979, with the other seven tracks remaining unreleased until 1992. It is regarded as the band's eighth studio album, despite being released after "Riding On A Rainbow" (as the Rubettes albums have been numbered in recording, rather than release, order).

== Track listing ==
1. "Shangri'la" (John Richardson) - 4:04
2. "Misbehavin'" (Alan Williams) - 3:35
3. "Stay With Me" (Alan Williams) - 3:07
4. "Tongue Tied Man" (Alan Williams) - 4:32
5. "Southbound Train" (Mick Clarke) - 3:44
6. "I Never Knew You At All" (Alan Williams) - 3:16
7. "Let Me Down Slowly" (John Richardson) - 4:20
8. "One Way Traffic" (Alan Williams) - 3:50
9. "Butterfly" (Alan Williams) - 4:41
10. "Kid Runaway" (John Richardson, Alan Williams) - 3:12

== Singles ==
1. "Stay With Me" b/w "Au Revoir" - March 1979
2. "Kid Runaway" b/w "Southbound Train" - May 1979

== Personnel ==
- Bob Benham
- Mick Clarke
- John Richardson
- Alan Williams

== Publishers ==
- Tracks 1, 5, 7 & 10 - Halcyon Music Ltd
- Tracks 2, 3, 4, 6, 8 & 9 - Jonalco Music Ltd

== Production and credits ==
- A Rubettes/Alan Blakley production
