= Hello World (Tremeloes song) =

1969 single by the Tremeloes

- Cover of the single released in Germany

Single by the Tremeloes
- B-side: "Up, Down, All Around"
- Released: 7 March 1969
- Genre: Pop rock
- Length: 3:26
- Label: CBS
- Songwriter: Tony Hazzard
- Producer: Mike Smith

The Tremeloes singles chronology
"I Shall Be Released" (1968)	"Hello World" (1969)	"Once on a Sunday Morning" (1969)

"Hello World" is a song written by Tony Hazzard. It was recorded and released as a single by the Tremeloes in March 1969 and peaked at number 14 on the UK Singles Chart.

== Background and release ==
Hazzard wrote the song at the suggestion of his publisher for the Eurovision Song Contest 1969. He conceived "Hello World" as an "obvious title" and intended it for Cliff Richard, who recorded Britain's entry "Congratulations" for the 1968 contest. However, the song was rejected in the first round by the Music Publishers Association. It was one of three songs rejected for that year's contest that ultimately became hit singles, the others being Roger Cook, Roger Greenaway and Jerry Lordan's "Good Times (Better Times)" (a number 12 hit for Cliff Richard) and Geoff Stephens and John Carter's "My Sentimental Friend" (a number 2 hit for Herman's Hermits).

The Tremeloes recorded the song as they were fans of Hazzard's previous hit songs. It was released as a single in March 1969 with the B-side "Up, Down, All Around", written by band members Len "Chip" Hawkes and Alan Blakley. The band promoted the single with appearances on Top of the Pops, The Golden Shot and The Basil Brush Show. It peaked at number 14 on 22 April 1969, returning the band to the UK top twenty after the relative failure of the previous single, a recording of Bob Dylan's "I Shall Be Released" that peaked at number 29 in December 1968. In an April 1969 edition of Record Mirror, Blakley revealed he didn't want it to be released, saying "I didn't expect "Hello World" to be even a top twenty hit, I didn't really like it. "I Shall Be Released", on the other hand, was not a commercial proposition, but it was a worthwhile record and was better than the things we usually do".

== Reception ==
The band received some criticism for a perceived retreat to more commercial territory following the disappointing performance of "I Shall Be Released". Philip Crawley of the Newcastle Journal suggested they had reverted "to the lowest common denominator of pop" while Tony Barrow, writing under his pseudonym Disker in the Liverpool Echo, said the band were "back in the usual happy-go-lucky rut". Reviewing the single in the Daily Mirror, Don Short characterised it as "pleasant, but not as startling as the Tremeloes can be". Geoffrey Elliot of the Coventry Evening Telegraph criticised the song as having "none of the verve of their earlier hits" and considered its changes in tempo "more annoying than arresting".

Derek Johnson for New Musical Express described it as "typical Trems material – almost predictable. But it doesn't have such an instantly catchy chorus as some of their big hits and this could prevent it from becoming a whopper. Nevertheless, the cheerful, carefree sound, the relatively attractive tune and the bouncy beat makes it hitworthy". Peter Jones for Record Mirror praised the song, writing that "they are back to the optimistic, fast-paced sort of determination that registered before ["I Shall Be Released"] – and "Hello World" is the right mixture of breeziness and brashness that should restore them high in the charts".

== Charts ==
Chart (1969)	Peak position
New Zealand (Listener)	20
South Africa (Springbok Radio)	5
UK Singles (OCC)	14
