= Warm Sounds =

Warm Sounds was an English musical duo, consisting of Denver Gerrard and Barry Husband, and later adding John Carr. They are considered a one hit wonder for their hit single, "Birds and Bees", from 1967. However they had an "airplay hit" follow up with "Sticks and Stones" in August 1967. The song became a UK singles chart number 27, week ending 20th May 1967 UK singles chart It was climbing the Radio London Fab 40 when the station closed on 15 August, and had risen to number 9 in the final chart. The group existed from 1967 to 1968 before disbanding.

Toward the end of their career, the duo mixed heavily overdubbed and experimental psychedelic tapes. Carr and Husband later joined the band, Hapshash and the Coloured Coat.

== Charts ==
Year	Single	Chart	Peak position
1967	"Birds and Bees"	UK Singles Chart	27
1967	"Birds and Bees"	Radio London chart	1
1967	"Birds and Bees"	New Zealand (Listener)	19
