= Alan Blakley =

British guitarist and record producer (1942–1996)

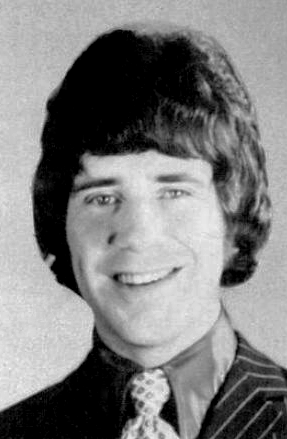
- Born: Alan David Blakley; 1 April 1942; Bromley, Kent, England
- Died: 1 June 1996 (aged 54); London, England
- Spouse: Lin Blakley
- Children: 2, including Claudie
- Relatives: Mike Blakley (brother)
- Musical career
- Genres: Pop, rock
- Occupations: Guitarist, songwriter, record producer
- Years active: 1958–1996
- Formerly of: The Tremeloes

Alan David Blakley (1 April 1942 – 1 June 1996) was a British musician and record producer. A member of the Tremeloes from 1958 to 1996, he was the father of actress Claudie Blakley. As a producer, he worked on the hit song "She's Gonna Win" for Bilbo, and nearly all the studio albums for glam rock sensations The Rubettes.

Blakley left the Tremeloes in 1975 to produce for Bilbo and Rubettes, eventually returning a few years later. He was forced to retire in 1996 due to suffering from cancer, which he died from not long after, aged 54.

== Career ==
=== The Tremeloes ===
Blakley is best known as the rhythm guitarist and keyboard player with the Tremeloes. He was the co-writer of most of their hits until January 1972, when he started writing for other bands.

Blakley formed Brian Poole and the Tremeloes (originally spelt correctly as "Tremoloes") in 1958. They initially found success in the British Invasion era with lead singer Brian Poole, scoring a UK chart-topper in 1963 with "Do You Love Me". After Poole's departure in 1966, the band achieved further success as a four-piece with 13 top 40 hits on the UK Singles Chart between 1967 and 1971, including "Here Comes My Baby", "Even the Bad Times Are Good", "(Call Me) Number One", "Me and My Life" and their most successful single, "Silence Is Golden" (1967).

=== Songwriting and producing ===
Blakley left the Tremeloes in 1972. His credits include co-writing (with Len Hawkes) various hits for the Tremeloes, co-producing the UK No. 42 hit "She's Gonna Win", with Bilbo, and co-producing singles and albums by Mungo Jerry with the group's leader, Ray Dorset. He subsequently rejoined the Tremeloes in 1979 until forced to retire for health reasons.

Blakley is known for co-producing many albums by The Rubettes. He co-produced all the Rubettes albums from"Rubettes" (1975), onwards, which also includes: "Sign of the Times" (1976), "Baby I Know" (1977), "Sometime In Oldchurch" (1978), and "Shangri'la" (recorded 1979, released 1992),

== Personal life ==
Alan David Blakley was born in Bromley, Kent in 1942.

Blakley married actress Lin Blakley, and they had two daughters: Claudie Blakley and Kirsten Blakley. Claudie (born 1974) is an actor, who won the Ian Charleson Award for her performance in The Seagull at the West Yorkshire Playhouse in Leeds in 1998.

His brother Mike Blakley was also a musician, and a drummer in the band Christie, who in 1970 had a hit with "Yellow River", a song written by Christie frontman Jeff Christie, originally intended for the Tremeloes, who turned it down but Alan gave the song to Mike's band "The Epics", who then became "Christie" under Jeff's lead.

Blakley died in London of cancer in June 1996, aged 54.

== Discography ==
(See The Tremeloes discography.)
