= Even the Bad Times Are Good =

1967 single by the Tremeloes

Single by the Tremeloes

from the album Here Come the Tremeloes
- B-side: "Jenny's Alright"
- Released: 28 July 1967
- Genre: Sunshine pop; pop rock
- Length: 2:36
- Label: CBS; Epic
- Songwriters: Peter Callander; Mitch Murray
- Producer: Mike Smith

The Tremeloes singles chronology
"Silence Is Golden" (1967)	"Even the Bad Times Are Good" (1967)	"Be Mine" (1967)

"Even the Bad Times Are Good" is a song recorded by British group the Tremeloes, released as a single in July 1967. It became their third consecutive top-ten hit in the UK and continued their international success.

== Release and reception ==
"Even the Bad Times Are Good" was written by songwriting duo Peter Callander and Mitch Murray. The song was a contender for Sandie Shaw to sing at the Eurovision Song Contest 1967; however, it lost out to the eventual Eurovision winner "Puppet on a String". After this, the song was quickly picked up by the Tremeloes who first released their version in May 1967 on their album Here Comes the Tremeloes. Following the number-one success of "Silence Is Golden", "Even the Bad Times Are Good" was released as a single with the B-side, "Jenny's Alright", written by the Tremeloes' Len "Chip" Hawkes and Alan Blakley.

Reviewing for Disc and Music Echo, Penny Valentine described the song as "another saga of simplicity and drum-thumping much in the vein of "Here Comes My Baby". For one moment at the beginning when everyone broke into extraordinary cackling I had my doubts and wondered if the Tremeloes were about to freak out. But ah, no, here we go, lads – thump, bang, crash, wallop".

== Track listings ==
7": CBS / 2930 (UK)

1. "Even the Bad Times Are Good" – 2:36
2. "Jenny's Alright" – 2:24

7": Epic / 5-10233 (US and Canada)

1. "Even the Bad Times Are Good" – 2:24
2. "Jenny's All Right" – 2:22

== Charts ==
Chart (1967)	Peak position
Argentina (Escalera a la Fama)	3
Australia (Kent Music Report)	46
Belgium (Ultratop 50 Flanders)	9
Belgium (Ultratop 50 Wallonia)	8
Canada Top Singles (RPM)	7
Denmark (Danmarks Radio)	13
Finland (Suomen virallinen lista)	22
Germany (GfK)	18
Ireland (IRMA)	7
Israel (Kol Israel)	1
Malaysia (Radio Malaysia)	4
Netherlands (Dutch Top 40)	7
Netherlands (Single Top 100)	3
New Zealand (Listener)	2
Rhodesia (Lyons Maid)	1
South Africa (Springbok Radio)	2
Sweden (Kvällstoppen)	5
Sweden (Tio i Topp)	2
UK Melody Maker Top 30	5
UK New Musical Express Top 30	5
UK Record Retailer Top 50	4
US Billboard Hot 100	36
US Cash Box Top 100	44

== Personnel ==
- Dave Munden – lead vocals, drums (died 2020)
- Rick Westwood – vocals (during chorus), lead guitar
- Alan Blakley – vocals (during chorus), rhythm guitar (died 1996)
- Len Hawkes – vocals (during chorus), bass guitar
