= Me and My Life =

1970 single by the Tremeloes

- Cover of the single released in the Netherlands

Single by the Tremeloes

from the album Master
- B-side: "Try Me"
- Released: 21 August 1970
- Genre: Pop rock
- Length: 3:06
- Label: CBS
- Songwriter(s): Alan Blakley; Len Hawkes
- Producer(s): Mike Smith

The Tremeloes singles chronology
"By the Way" (1970)	"Me and My Life" (1970)	"Right Wheel, Left Hammer, Sham!" (1971)

"Me and My Life" is a song by British band the Tremeloes, released as a single in August 1970 from their album Master. It peaked at number 4 on the UK Singles Chart, becoming the Tremeloes' final top-ten hit.

== Reception ==
Reviewing for Record Mirror, Peter Jones wrote that it was "Definitely a change of style. Away, temporarily perhaps, with the happy old sing-along material and in with something much more thoughtful, more complex, more ambitious all the way round. But there's a strong basic beat anyway, and some of the instrumental gimmickry hits home with impact".

== Track listing ==
7"

1. "Me and My Life" – 3:06
2. "Try Me" – 3:36

== Charts ==
Chart (1970–71)	Peak position
Austria (Ö3 Austria Top 40)	5
Belgium (Ultratop 50 Wallonia)	46
Germany (GfK)	6
Ireland (IRMA)	2
Netherlands (Dutch Top 40)	33
Netherlands (Single Top 100)	27
Rhodesia (Lyons Maid)	6
Singapore (Rediffusion)	2
South Africa (Springbok Radio)	5
Sweden (Tio i Topp)	12
UK Singles (OCC)	4
