= Lightning Records (UK label) =

- Founded: 1977
- Genre: Reggae, dub, disco, punk
- Country of origin: England

Lightning Records was a London-based record label founded in the 1970s. It specialised in disco, reggae and dub music but also released music from other genres such as punk rock. It was a subsidiary of WEA.

Amongst its artists and titles are Althia & Donna with "Uptown Top Ranking", Janet Kay with "Silly Games", Dennis Brown with "Money in My Pocket", and Errol Dunkley with "OK Fred". The Old Gold Label was subsequently set up from here and featured many original classics licensed from other labels, for example Clifford T. Ward's song "Gaye", Python Lee Jackson's "In a Broken Dream", and re-releases by the Everly Brothers, the Equals, Trini Lopez and Ketty Lester.
