= Silence Is Golden (song) =

1964 single by The Four Seasons

Single by The Four Seasons

from the album Born to Wander
- A-side: "Rag Doll"
- Released: 1964
- Genre: Pop
- Length: 3:25
- Label: Philips
- Songwriters: Bob Crewe; Bob Gaudio
- Producer: Bob Crewe

"Silence Is Golden" is a song initially recorded by the American rock band the Four Seasons. Written by Bob Crewe and Bob Gaudio, Philips Records released it in 1964 as the B-side of the U.S. number 1 single "Rag Doll", which was also written by Crewe and Gaudio. The Tremeloes' 1967 cover version reached number 1 on the UK Singles Chart and number 11 on the US charts.

== The Tremeloes version ==
"Silence Is Golden"
- UK picture sleeve

Single by The Tremeloes
- B-side: "Let Your Hair Hang Down"
- Released: 21 April 1967
- Recorded: 1967
- Genre: Pop
- Length: 3:11
- Label: CBS (UK); Epic (US and Canada)
- Songwriters: Bob Crewe, Bob Gaudio
- Producer: Mike Smith

The Tremeloes singles chronology
"Here Comes My Baby" (1967)	"Silence Is Golden" (1967)	"Even the Bad Times Are Good" (1968)

In 1967 British band The Tremeloes recorded their sound-alike version, using the same arrangement as the original. It reached the top position on the UK chart on 18 May 1967, where it stayed for three weeks. Band member Len "Chip" Hawkes remembered getting up in the middle of the night, going to London with the rest of the band, and walking down The Strand, on the night the song reached number one. Guitarist Rick Westwood sang lead vocal on "Silence Is Golden". In the U.S., Epic Records released the single, which reached number 11 on the Billboard Hot 100 chart and was one of the top 100 songs of 1967. The record sold one million copies globally, earning gold disc status.

The song was also covered in 1967 by The Plus Four, and by Swedish singer Jim Jidhed (in English) in 1989. The Tremeloes recorded an Italian version, "E in silenzio".

=== Chart history ===
==== Weekly charts ====
Chart (1967)	Peak position
Australia (Go-Set)	3
Australia (Kent Music Report)	5
Austria (Ö3 Austria Top 40)	4
Belgium (Ultratop 50 Flanders)	10
Belgium (Ultratop 50 Wallonia)	34
Canada Top Singles (RPM)	8
Denmark (Danmarks Radio)	2
Finland (Suomen virallinen lista)	9
Germany (GfK)	8
Ireland (IRMA)	1
Malaysia (Radio Malaysia)	3
Netherlands (Dutch Top 40)	4
Netherlands (Single Top 100)	5
New Zealand (Listener)	1
Norway (VG-lista)	1
Rhodesia (Lyons Maid)	1
South Africa (Springbok Radio)	1
Spain (Promusicae)	18
Sweden (Kvällstoppen)	4
Sweden (Tio i Topp)	2
UK Disc and Music Echo Top 30	1
UK Melody Maker Top 30	1
UK New Musical Express Top 30	1
UK Record Retailer Top 50	1
US Billboard Hot 100	11
US Cash Box Top 100	9

==== Year-end charts ====
Chart (1967)	Rank
Australia (Kent Music Report)	46
Austria (O3 Austria)	16
Canada Top Singles (RPM)	53
Netherlands (Dutch Top 40)	35
South Africa (Springbok Radio)	1
US Billboard Hot 100	45
US Cash Box	56

=== Personnel ===
- Rick Westwood – falsetto vocals, lead guitar
- Alan Blakley – vocals, rhythm guitar
- Len Hawkes – vocals, bass guitar
- Dave Munden – vocals, drums
