= The Tremeloes =

English beat group

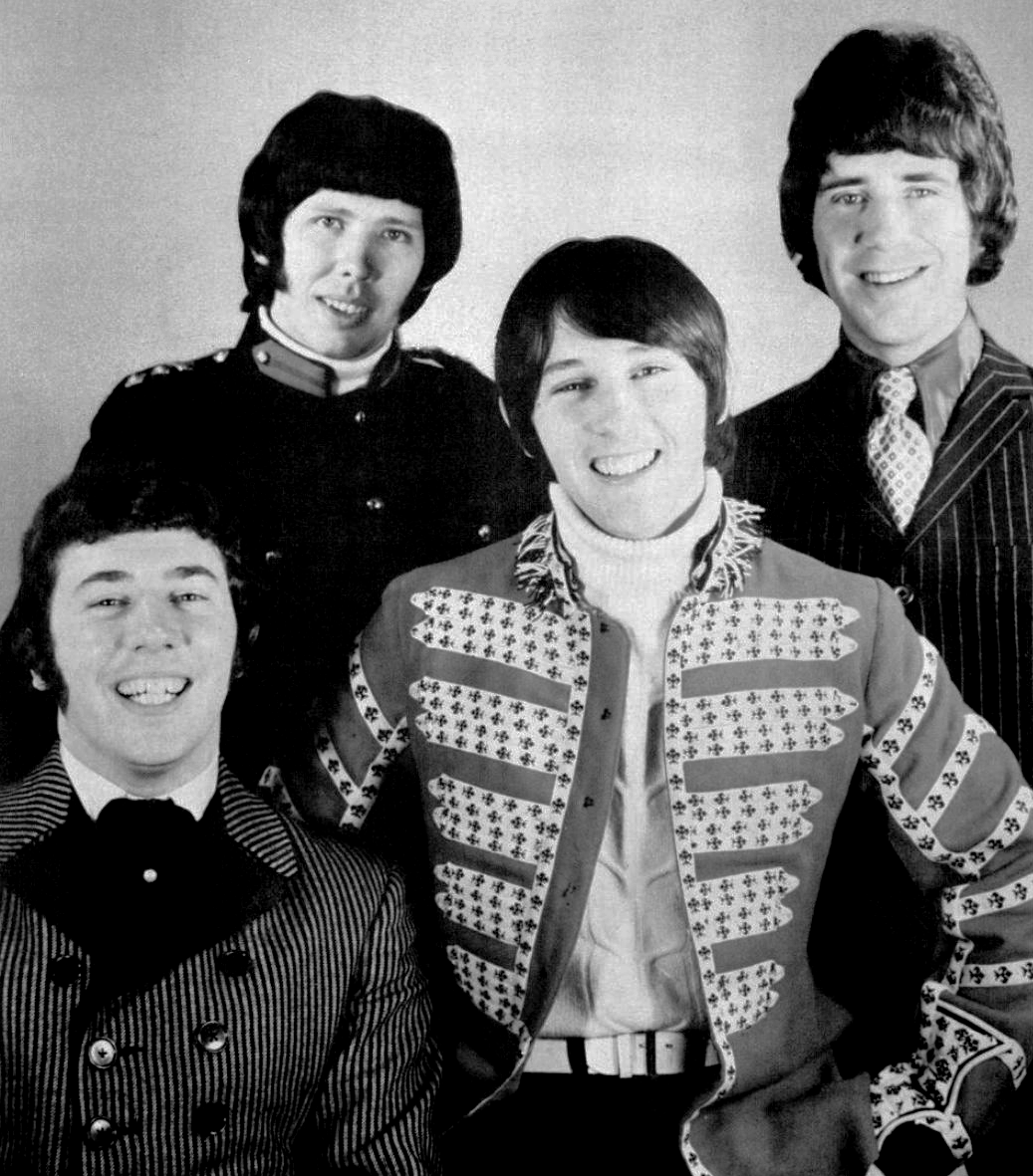
- The Tremeloes in 1968. Left to right: Dave Munden, Rick Westwood, Len "Chip" Hawkes, Alan Blakley

Background information
- Also known as: Brian Poole and the Tremeloes
- Origin: Dagenham, England
- Genres: Beat; pop rock; soft rock
- Years active: 1958–present
- Labels: Decca, CBS (UK), Epic (US)
- Members: Mick Clarke; Len "Chip" Hawkes; Jodie Hawkes; Richard Marsh; Eddie Wheeler
- Past members: Dave Munden; Rick Westwood; Alan Blakley; Brian Poole; Alan Howard; Bob Benham; Paul Carman; Aaron Woolley; Paul Issac; Joe Gillingham; Dave Fryer; Jeff Brown; Phil Wright; Eddie Jones; Syd Twynham; Chesney Hawkes
- Website: thetremeloes.co.uk

The Tremeloes, originally Brian Poole and The Tremeloes, are an English beat group founded in 1958 in Dagenham, England. They initially found success in the British Invasion era with lead singer Brian Poole, scoring eight top 40 hits on the UK Singles Chart from 1963 to 1965, including a No. 1 with "Do You Love Me" in 1963. The original line-up consisted of Poole, lead guitarist Rick Westwood, rhythm guitarist Alan Blakley, bassist Alan Howard, and drummer Dave Munden. Both Poole and Howard departed in 1966. The Tremeloes continued as a four-piece - initially with bassist Mick Clarke, who was replaced by Len "Chip" Hawkes later that year - with all the members singing (though most of the leads were sung by Hawkes and Munden). The group had a further 13 UK top 40 hits between 1967 and 1971 including a second No. 1 with "Silence Is Golden" in 1967, as well as "Here Comes My Baby" and "Even the Bad Times Are Good" the same year, "(Call Me) Number One" in 1969, and "Me and My Life" in 1970. Various other musicians came and went after 1972, though Westwood, Blakley, Munden, and Hawkes, as well as Poole and Clarke, have all at some point performed with later versions of the band, which is still together as of 2026.

Two band members had children who become pop stars in their own right. Poole's daughters Karen and Shelly Poole made several hit records as "Alisha's Attic" between 1996 and 2001. Hawkes's son Chesney Hawkes is a successful singer-songwriter who has also toured for a while as a member of the Tremeloes.

== Career ==
=== Brian Poole and the Tremeloes ===
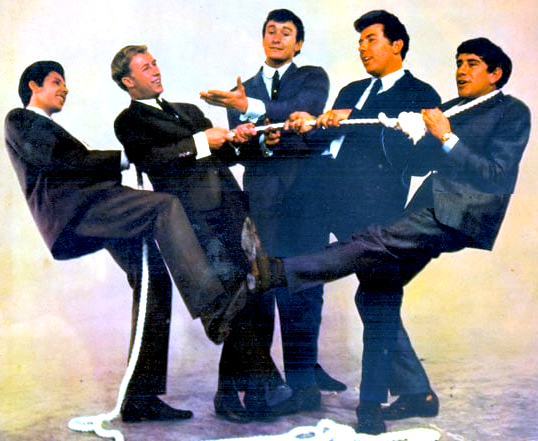
Brian Poole and the Tremeloes in 1963. Left to right: Rick Westwood, Alan Howard, Brian Poole, Dave Munden, Alan Blakley

Brian Poole and the Tremoloes formed in Dagenham, England in 1958. Strongly influenced by Buddy Holly and the Crickets, the group comprised lead vocalist Brian Poole, lead guitarist Rick Westwood, rhythm guitarist/keyboardist Alan Blakley, bassist Alan Howard and drummer Dave Munden.

On New Year's Day, 1962, Decca, looking for a beat group, auditioned two promising young bands: Brian Poole and the Tremeloes and another combo (also heavily influenced by Buddy Holly) from Liverpool, the Beatles. Decca chose Brian Poole and the Tremeloes over the Beatles, reportedly, in part, based on location. The Tremeloes were from the London area, making them more accessible than the Liverpool-based Beatles.

Brian Poole and the Tremeloes first charted in the UK in July 1963 with a pop rock cover version of "Twist and Shout", a song previously popularised in America by the Isley Brothers, and already released by the Beatles in the UK in March 1963 on their first British LP, Please Please Me. They released a pop cover version of US hit "Do You Love Me" in the same year, and the song reached No. 1 on the UK Singles Chart. The group also had success in the UK in 1964 with covers of Roy Orbison's B-side "Candy Man" and a previously obscure Crickets B-side ballad, "Someone, Someone": both entered the UK top ten, the latter peaking at No. 2. Other Decca-era chart singles included "Three Bells" and a version of "I Want Candy". In early 1966, Howard left the band, and the music business altogether, and was replaced by Mick Clarke.

=== The Tremeloes ===
Poole left the band in mid-1966. He made a brief and not very successful attempt at a solo career before going into business as a butcher with his brother. He returned to making music professionally many years later, while his daughters, Karen and Shelly, had several hits during the late 1990s and early 2000s as Alisha's Attic.

The remaining members chose to continue as a four-piece. Their first post-Poole single, released on Decca, was a cover of Paul Simon's song "Blessed", which failed to chart. After this, the group switched from Decca to CBS Records, with Mike Smith producing. The Tremeloes' first single on CBS was a cover of The Beatles' Revolver song "Good Day Sunshine". This also failed to chart, but established a new image of a more contemporary group in tune with the times, which set them up for future success. They started a run of hits in 1967 with Cat Stevens' "Here Comes My Baby", the first single with new bassist Len "Chip" Hawkes, who replaced Clarke in late 1966. Further hits included "Hello World"; three Italian hits translated into English: "Suddenly You Love Me", which is Riccardo Del Turco's "Uno tranquillo" ("One quiet man"), "I'm Gonna Try", which is Riccardo Del Turco's 1968 hit "Luglio" ("July"), and "My Little Lady", based on Orietta Berti's "Non illuderti mai" ("Never deceive yourself"); and their No. 1 recording of a Four Seasons B-side "Silence Is Golden". Both this last single and "Here Comes My Baby" also entered the Top 20 of the U.S. Billboard Hot 100 on Epic Records, co-owned by CBS.

All members shared vocals, though most of the songs featured either Hawkes or drummer Dave Munden as the lead singer. Guitarist Rick Westwood sang falsetto co-lead vocal with Hawkes' lower range vocal and group harmonies also featured on "Silence Is Golden". Their regular hits were accompanied by frequent appearances on BBC's Top of the Pops TV programme. Their songs were popular with younger music fans and parents rather than rock music fans, although their albums and B-sides included more rock-styled tracks such as band compositions "Try Me" and the instrumental "Instant Whip". Their more commercial songs, such as "Even the Bad Times Are Good" (UK No. 4, 1967), "Helule Helule" (UK No. 14, 1967), "Suddenly You Love Me" and "My Little Lady" (both UK No. 8 in 1968), proved to be more popular than the falsetto-led "Be Mine" sung by Rick Westwood, which stalled in the lower top 40, or a string-accompanied cover of Bob Dylan's "I Shall Be Released" (UK No. 29, 1969), but the more ambitious group-composed "(Call Me) Number One" reached No. 2 in the UK in 1969. Altogether, without Poole the group had nine UK Top 20 hits.

Westwood and Blakley were dual lead guitarists with guitar/sitar and banjo, pedal steel guitar and keyboards featured on their songs. Hawkes could play drums in addition to bass guitar.

Their cover version of Jeff Christie's song "Yellow River" (sung by Dave Munden) was shelved at the time, but Christie's lead vocal set to their backing became a UK chart hit for Christie in 1970. The Tremeloes versions sung in both English and Spanish later were released on compact disc compilations. "Me and My Life", written by Blakley and Hawkes, was a No. 4 UK chart hit in 1970, while "By the Way" reached No. 35 that year. Their album Master, which they released a few weeks later, failed to sell well. By this time, more "edgy" hard rock bands like Led Zeppelin, Deep Purple and Black Sabbath were all the rage in the UK, but the Tremeloes never went in this direction and they had no British hits after "Hello Buddy" (No. 32) in 1971. Nevertheless they recorded several more singles throughout the decade, with further chart singles in Europe, including "Blue Suede Tie" (No. 38, Germany), "Too Late to Be Saved" (No. 33, Germany), "Ride On" (No. 16, Germany), "Say O.K. (Say Ole You Love Me)", and "Do I Love You", some of which received heavy airplay, particularly on Radio Luxembourg. "I Like It That Way" even made the Dutch Top 10, reaching No. 9 after the Dutch service of Radio North Sea International promoted it as its weekly Treiterschijf. They also released another three albums of original material, including Shiner (1974) and Don't Let the Music Die (1975). In 1983 they covered Europop tune "Words", originally by F. R. David.

Their line-up changed several times from 1972 onwards, the first new entrant being Bob Benham, who replaced Blakley. Paul Carman replaced Hawkes in 1974, while Aaron Woolley and Paul Isaac replaced Westwood in 1975. Blakley, Hawkes and Westwood would all later return to the band at different times. Munden remained the only constant member. Hawkes pursued a solo career for a while producing two albums for RCA Records in Nashville, Tennessee. In 1979 he returned to England and rejoined the Tremeloes where he remained until 1988, leaving to focus on managing his son, Chesney, who had a number one hit record entitled "The One and Only". By 1992 Hawkes was touring once again as a solo artist.

Blakley died from cancer in June 1996, leaving Munden and Westwood to continue in concert with newer recruits Dave Fryer (bass) and Joe Gillingham (keyboards). Jeff Brown, former bass player and lead vocals for The Sweet, replaced Fryer in 2005. Dave Fryer retired to live in Germany after leaving the band, and continues to write music and play occasionally.

In April 2004, at the request of the Animals, who were about to do their 40th anniversary tour, Hawkes was asked to form a band to tour with the Animals. This he did, bringing together a supergroup including Mick Avory (ex-the Kinks), Eric Haydock (ex-the Hollies), who teamed up to perform as the Class of '64, also featuring guitarists Telecaster Ted Tomlin and Graham Pollock. The band toured around the world and recorded an album of past band hits and a new single called "She's Not My Child".

Brian Poole, Chip Hawkes and the Tremeloes toured the UK as part of their 40th anniversary reunion in September 2006.

In November 2015, Westwood and Hawkes were both charged with sexual assault relating to a case from 1968. They were acquitted in July 2016.

In 2019 two separate entities were touring—the latest incarnation of the original Tremeloes with Westwood, Clarke and Hawkes, along with Hawkes' son Jodie and Richard Marsh, and a tribute band "The Trems" with Gillingham, Brown, Twynham and Phil Wright (of the band Paper Lace). Hawkes stated in an interview that Munden had retired following knee issues resulting from a fall. Brian Poole toured with the band again in 2016, and played with his own band Brian Poole & Electrix. As of 2019 he appeared to no longer be actively performing.

Original drummer Dave Munden (born on 2 December 1943) died on 15 October 2020, at age 76.

In 2021, Chip Hawkes, Rick Westwood, Mick Clarke, Jodie Hawkes and Richard Marsh were still performing live as the Tremeloes on the UK nostalgia circuits, whilst in 2022, Chesney Hawkes joined his brother Jodie as a member, becoming the band's singer for a series of dates.

== Members ==
Current members

- Mick Clarke – bass, vocals (1966, 1992–1996, 2019–present)
- Len "Chip" Hawkes – bass, vocals (1966–1974, 1979–1988, 2019–present)
- Jodie Hawkes – drums, vocals (2019–present)
- Richard Marsh – guitar, vocals (2019–present)
- Eddie Wheeler – guitar, vocals (2021–present)

Former members

- Dave Munden – drums, vocals (1958–2018; died 2020)
- Rick Westwood – guitar, vocals (1958–1975, 1976–2012)
- Alan Blakley – rhythm guitar, keyboards, vocals (1958–1972, 1978–1979, 1981–1996; his death)
- Brian Poole – vocals (1958–1966, 2006, 2016)
- Alan Howard – bass, vocals (1958–1966)
- Bob Benham – guitar, vocals (1972–1978, 1979–1981)
- Paul Carman – bass, rhythm guitar, vocals (1974–1979; died 2021)
- Aaron Woolley – guitar, vocals (1975–1976)
- Paul Issac – guitar, vocals (1975–1979)
- Joe Gillingham – keyboards, vocals (1988–2019)
- Dave Fryer – bass, vocals (1988–2005)
- Jeff Brown – bass, vocals (2005–2019)
- Phil Wright – drums, vocals (2013–2019)
- Eddie Jones – guitar, vocals (2013–2014)
- Syd Twynham – guitar, vocals (2014–2017)
- Chesney Hawkes – vocals (2022)

== Discography ==
=== Studio Albums ===
As Brian Poole and the Tremeloes

- Big Big Hits of '62 (1963)
- Twist and Shout (1963)
- It's About Time (1965)
- Brian Poole Is Here! (1965)

As the Tremeloes

- Here Come the Tremeloes (1967)
- Even the Bad Times Are Good / Silence Is Golden (1967)
- Alan, Dave, Rick and Chip (1967)
- Suddenly You Love Me (1968)
- World Explosion! (1968)
- Master (1970)
- Shiner (1974)
- Don't Let the Music Die (as Space) (1975)
- Greatest Hits (1981, re-recordings)
- Million Sellers (1988, re-recordings)
- May Morning (2000, soundtrack recorded in 1970)

== See also ==
- The Beatles' Decca audition

== Bibliography ==
- The Guinness Book of 500 Number One Hits – ISBN 0-85112-250-7
