= Mike Smith (British music producer) =

British record producer (1935–2011)

- Born: Michael Robert Smith; 30 April 1935; Barking, Essex, England
- Died: 3 December 2011 (aged 76); Camberley, Surrey, England
- Occupations: Record producer; A&R manager

Michael Robert Smith (30 April 1935 – 3 December 2011) was a British record producer and A&R manager. He was known for producing numerous hit records during the 1960s for artists including the Tremeloes, Billy Fury and Georgie Fame. He also notably turned down the chance to sign the Beatles for Decca Records in 1961.

== Early life ==
Mike Smith was born in Barking in 1935 and was educated at Barking Abbey Grammar School. At school, despite having little interest in music, he learnt to play the trombone, after being encouraged by his father who was a brass-band enthusiast. At the age of 16, he worked as a clerk with the British Electricity Authority, before joining the Royal Air Force as a ground electrician. Smith also joined the station band as a trombonist but said that he was "so bad they threw me out". After completing his national service, Smith worked various jobs, including being a costing clerk and moving oil drums around Barking Wharf, before seeing an advertisement in The Daily Telegraph that the BBC were looking for technicians. He applied and spent most of his time in the recording department at the BBC's European Service headquarters in Bush House. In 1958, after several of his colleagues went to Decca as recording engineers and told Smith of trips to Vienna, Paris and Milan, he soon followed them to work at Decca.

== Music industry career ==
At Decca, Smith was hired by producer Frank Lee to assist him in recording sessions for the likes of Mantovani, Edmundo Ros, Vera Lynn and Winifred Atwell. For an office party, Smith made a spoof radio tribute about Lee, and after hearing it, Lee was so impressed by Smith's technical ability that he promoted him to a producer. The first record he produced by himself was by Bridie Gallagher, about which he said that "without the engineers and [orchestra conductor] Eric Rogers and the rest I'd have been in dead trouble". After Dick Rowe rejoined Decca in 1961 as A&R manager, the two worked closely together, with Smith as his A&R assistant. They notably co-produced numerous hit singles for Billy Fury from 1961 onwards including "Halfway to Paradise" and "Jealousy".

In December 1961, Brian Epstein, the manager for the then relatively unknown band the Beatles used his influence to invite Decca to audition the band after they had been rejected by a number of other labels. Smith travelled to The Cavern Club in Liverpool to watch them perform and impressed he invited them to a formal audition at Decca Studios on New Year's Day (though later Smith said "I should have trusted my instincts [in signing them] as I thought they were wonderful on stage"). Whilst the Beatles were nervous and had to use Decca's studio equipment, after Smith who had arrived late after an all-night party deemed their equipment substandard, the members and Epstein were confident after the session that they would get a contract with Decca. However, that same day, another group, Brian Poole and the Tremeloes were also auditioning with Decca to try to secure a contract. Smith wanted to sign both groups, but Rowe told him that they would only take one of the groups and left the decision up to Smith. The Tremeloes, who had performed better in the audition and were local to the London area, were chosen.

Whilst not reaching the level of success as the Beatles, the Tremeloes were still successful. Produced by Smith, the group had several top-ten UK hits, including the number-one "Do You Love Me", before the departure of Brian Poole in early 1966. During this period, Smith also produced hits for Fury, the Applejacks and Dave Berry. Following Poole's departure to start a solo career at CBS Records, the group continued. During a recording session with the Tremeloes, Smith found out he was earning less than the Tremeloes' van driver, so went to Rowe and asked to a raise. Rowe said he couldn't have one, nor a royalty, so Smith left Decca. Coincidentally, the Tremeloes contract with Decca was also coming to an end, so when that expired, Smith moved them to CBS, joining them as well, and became a staff producer in February 1967. The Tremeloes continued to achieve success under the production of Smith, including their only other number one "Silence Is Golden". In the second half of the 1960s, Smith produced numerous hits, including the number ones "The Ballad of Bonnie and Clyde" by Georgie Fame, "Everlasting Love" by the Love Affair, and "Ob-La-Di, Ob-La-Da" by the Marmalade, and would produce one further number one "Yellow River" by Christie in 1970.

In 1977, a different Mike Smith, who had previously been a producer for London Weekend Television, was hired to be Decca's A&R manager. The original Smith later said that the job was supposed to be for him, stating that "apparently... they [Decca] asked around in the business about Mike Smith, got the story back on me and not the story back on the other one. It was a joke. They hired him based on my reputation". The newer Smith would go on to join GTO Records as general manager in 1979, before resigning the following year.
