= Brian Poole =

English musician (born 1941)

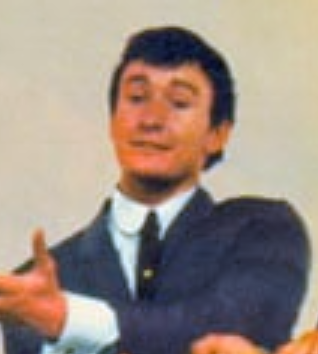
- Poole in 1963

Background information
- Born: 2 November 1941 (age 84); Dagenham, England
- Genres: Rock and roll; pop; beat
- Occupation: Singer
- Instruments: Vocals, guitar
- Works: The Tremeloes discography
- Years active: 1950s-present
- Formerly of: Brian Poole & The Tremeloes, The Corporation

Brian Poole (born 2 November 1941) is an English singer and performer who was the lead singer of 1960s beat band Brian Poole and the Tremeloes.

== Early life ==
He was brought up in the East End of London and grew up in Barking, Essex. Poole attended Park Modern Secondary School, Barking and Barking Abbey Grammar School.

== Career ==
=== Brian Poole and The Tremeloes ===
Poole met Alan Blakley and Alan Howard at Park Modern Secondary School, Barking. In 1956, heavily influenced by their interest in rock and roll music, they decided to form a band. The original line-up consisted of Poole (vocals, guitar), Blakley (guitar), Howard (bass) and Graham Scott (guitar). While still in their teens, the band members met and befriended Dave Munden, who shared a love and passion for rock n’ roll. A strong bond was formed, which saw Munden join the band on the drums in 1957. A swift change of tactics saw Blakley switch to guitar, which Poole relinquished to take the title of lead vocalist and thus front the band.

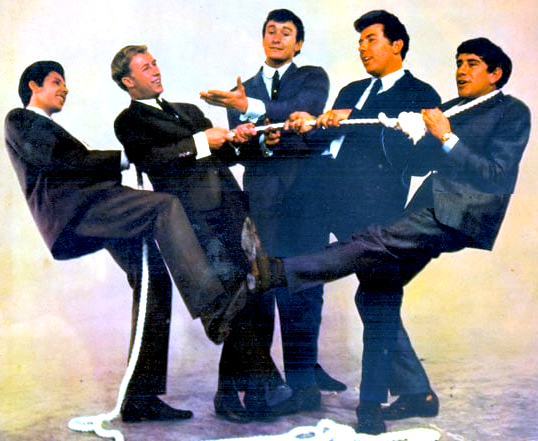
Brian Poole & The Tremeloes in 1963 (Poole in centre)

In the early years, the Tremeloes were inspired by Buddy Holly and the Crickets and mainly covered their songs. They quickly gained local fame by playing at small venues in the area; during that time, their singing style developed and flourished. With Poole's Holly-style glasses and the band's unique style of harmony, the Tremeloes soon developed a wide fan-base and following. This continued to grow until they became one of the top dance hall attractions across Great Britain. On New Year's Day in 1962, the Tremeloes auditioned for a record contract with Decca Records, along with another up-and-coming band, the Beatles. Their regular slot on BBC Radio and large following meant that the Tremeloes were an obvious choice, and they were signed by the record label. Upon signing with Decca, the company bosses insisted that the band be billed as 'Brian Poole and the Tremeloes', since this was the trend at the time.

The band quickly embraced their new name. Their diverse musical talents meant that as well as recording their own singles, they also performed as backing for other recording artists. Their first chart entry was "Twist and Shout" in June 1963 (a cover version of a song by the Isley Brothers that was also covered by the Beatles). "Twist and Shout" reached number four on the UK Singles Chart, selling over one million copies, and other chart hits were soon to follow. In September 1963, they released "Do You Love Me". It reached number one in the UK charts, famously knocking the Beatles’ second number one hit, "She Loves You", from the top slot. "Do You Love Me" remained at the top of the charts for three weeks. Brian Poole and the Tremeloes continued to produce hits and thrive in the UK charts, with tracks such as "Candy Man" (which reached number six) and the popular ballad "Someone, Someone" (which reached number two).

In 1966, Poole left the Tremeloes to begin a solo career and pursue other opportunities, one of which included starting his own record label called Outlook Records. Bass player Alan Howard also left, and was replaced by Len Hawkes. Blakley, Munden, Westwood, and Hawkes continued as the Tremeloes.

=== Later career ===
By the late 1960s, Poole was unable to keep up his reputation and spent most of the 1970s out of the music business working in his brother's butcher shop. Although he initially jokingly explained his focus on the family business by saying “My brother asked me to mind the shop one afternoon, he went out and never came back”, he clarified "It would be nice if that WAS the story. The truth is that my daughters were young and I wanted to spend more time at home. The family had got together and went into this big vacuum packing thing supplying supermarkets like Tesco and Asda. It was new in those days and I contracted all the machinery and got them transported. They were big things, cost around £30,000 each. We had 15 shops and the family worked in all the shops. If I didn't pop in to see them when I was in the area they would be asking, who does he think he is? So the shop story got about." Poole states that comedy duo Cannon and Ball persuaded him to return to music: “I went to see Cannon and Ball at Great Yarmouth and they saw me in the audience, stopped the show and said I should be back in the businesses where I belonged. I talked about it to the wife all the way home and decided I was going back”.

In 1988, Poole formed the supergroup The Corporation with Tony Crane (of The Merseybeats), Clem Curtis (of The Foundations), Mike Pender (of The Searchers), and Reg Presley (of The Troggs), all of whom were the lead singers for other 1960s beat groups. They only released one single, a cover of The Showstoppers' old hit "Ain't Nothing But a House Party". They split up that same year.

Poole had thoughts of retiring again in the early 2000s, but was also talked into staying in the industry, this time by the late Gerry Marsden of Gerry and the Pacemakers. Since then, he remains active, mainly touring either as a solo artist or in a 1960s nostalgia tour.

Poole has appeared twice at the Sixties Gold nostalgia circuit tour. In 2013, he toured with Len Hawkes, performing Tremeloes songs, and in 2017, Poole and Hawkes appeared on the Sixties Gold tour a second time, this time with Dave Munden as well.

== Family ==
In 1968, he married Pamela Poole (née Rice). Their two daughters, Shelly and Karen Poole, are both successful singer-songwriters. In the late 1990s and early 2000s, Karen and Shelly comprised the pop duo Alisha's Attic, who released three hit albums. They have both been part of many other projects since Alisha's Attic released its last album in 2001.

Poole lives in Milton Keynes, Buckinghamshire.

== Discography ==
=== Solo singles ===
A-Side	B-Side	Label	Release year
"Everything I Touch Turns to Tears"	"I Need Her Tonight"	CBS	1966
"Hey Girl"	"Please Be Mine"	DECCA	1966
"Just How Loud"	"The Other Side of the Sky"	CBS	1967
"That Reminds Me Baby"	"Tomorrow Never Comes"	CBS	1967
"Send Her to Me" (Brian Poole & the Seychelles)	"Pretty in the City"	President	1969
"What Do Women Most Desire"	"Treat Her Like a Woman"	President	1969
"Satisfied" (Brian Poole & Carousel)	"Red Leather"	Pinnacle	1975
"Ain't Nothing But a House Party" (The Corporation)	–	–	1988
