= Monolith (disambiguation) =

A monolith is a monument or natural feature consisting of a single massive stone or rock.

Monolith or monolithic may also refer to:

== Architecture ==
- Monolithic architecture, a style of construction in which a building is carved, cast or excavated from a single piece of material
- Monolithic column, column made from one single piece of stone
- Monolithic dome, structure cast in one piece over a form, made of concrete or similar structural material

== Arts and entertainment ==
=== Art ===
- Monolitten, Norwegian for The Monolith, a sculpture in Vigeland Sculpture Park in Norway
- Utah monolith, a metal pillar sculpture in the desert in Utah, U.S.
- Monolith, the Face of Half Dome, a photograph by Ansel Adams

=== Characters and entities ===
- Monolith, character from the Elementals comic book series
- Monolith (Space Odyssey), the Monoliths featured in 2001: A Space Odyssey and its sequels
- The Monolith, a faction from the video games S.T.A.L.K.E.R.: Shadow of Chernobyl and others in the same series

=== Entertainment companies ===
- Monolith Productions, Washington State–based video game development house and subsidiary of Warner Bros. Interactive Entertainment
- Monolith Soft, Japanese video game developer and subsidiary of Nintendo

=== Film ===
- Monolith (1993 film), an American film starring Bill Paxton
- Monolith (2016 film), an Italian sci-fi thriller starring Katrina Bowden
- Monolith (2022 film), an Australian sci-fi thriller starring Lily Sullivan

=== Literature ===
- Monolith (comics), comic book series and the name of its titular character
- Monolith (novel), a 2004 novel by John Passarella

=== Music ===
- Monolith (band), a Bulgarian rock band
- Monolith Festival, a 2007–2009 annual event at Red Rocks Amphitheatre, Colorado, US
- Monolith Tour, a 2018–2019 concert tour by Thirty Seconds to Mars

==== Albums ====
- Monolith (Amebix album) or the title instrumental, 1987
- Monolith (In Mourning album), 2010
- Monolith (Kansas album), 1979
- Monolith (Omid album), 2003
- Monolith (Sylosis album) or the title song, 2012
- Monolith, a box set by Buckethead (as Death Cube K), 2007

==== Songs ====
- "Monolith", by Cannibal Corpse from Vile, 1996
- "Monolith", by Delerium from Spheres, 1994
- "Monolith", by Erra from Neon, 2018
- "Monolith", by Fear Factory from Aggression Continuum, 2021
- "Monolith", by Fit for a King from Lonely God, 2025
- ”Monolith”, by Idles from Tangk, 2024
- "Monolith", by Jedi Mind Tricks from A History of Violence, 2008
- "Monolith", by Melanie Martinez from Hades, 2026
- "Monolith", by Mudvayne from L.D. 50, 2000
- "Monolith", by Stone Sour from Stone Sour, 2002
- "Monolith", by T. Rex from Electric Warrior, 1971
- "Monolith", by Thirty Seconds to Mars from America, 2018
- "Monolith", by Yello from Pocket Universe, 1997
- "The Monolith", by Becoming the Archetype from The Physics of Fire, 2007
- "The Monolith", by the Beta Band from The Patty Patty Sound, 1998
- "Monolithic", by Monster Magnet from Monolithic Baby!, 2004

== Computers ==
- Monolithic application, software architecture for computer applications
- Monolithic codebase, repository architecture for source control
- Monolithic kernel, kernel architecture for computer operating systems
- Monolithic system, computer system architecture where processing, data and the user interface all reside on the same system

== Electronic circuits ==
- Monolithic integrated circuit or "monolithic system", an electronic system, such as a processor, realized on a single die
- Monolithic microwave integrated circuit (often abbreviated MMIC), a type of integrated circuit (IC) device that operates at microwave frequencies (300 MHz to 300 GHz)

== Places ==
- Monolith, California, United States
- Mount Monolith, a mountain in Yukon, Canada
- The Monolith (Antarctica), a pair of Antarctic islets
- The Monoliths (Manchester-by-the-Sea), United States
- Phobos monolith, a rock on Mars' largest moon, Phobos

== Other uses ==
- Monolith (catalyst support), an extruded structure to support catalysts
- Single crystal, unified crystal, also called monocrystal or monolithic

== See also ==
- Mono (disambiguation)
- Lith (disambiguation)
