= Statue of Louis Agassiz =

Statue formerly installed in the U.S.

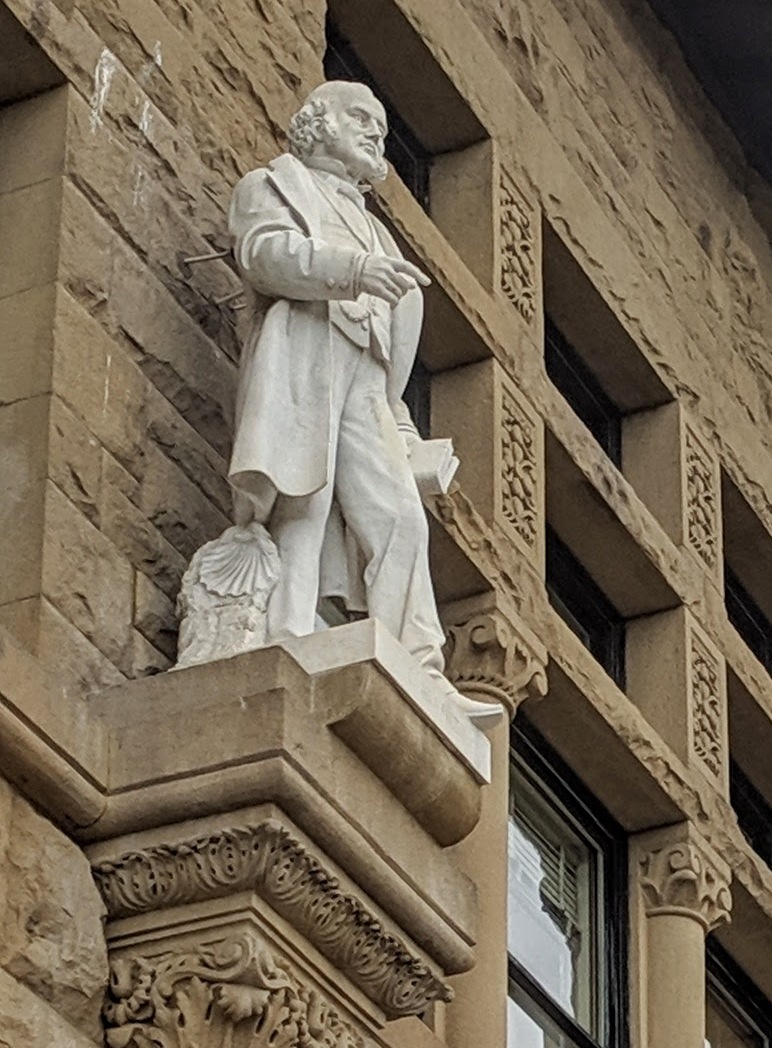
- The statue on the exterior of Jordan Hall, 2019
- Medium: Marble sculpture
- Subject: Louis Agassiz
- Location: Stanford, California, United States; 37.428787°N 122.170758°W

A statue of the 19th-century biologist and geologist Louis Agassiz was previously installed on the exterior of Building 420 (formerly Jordan Hall), in the Main Quad of Stanford University, in the U.S. state of California. It has since been removed.

== History ==
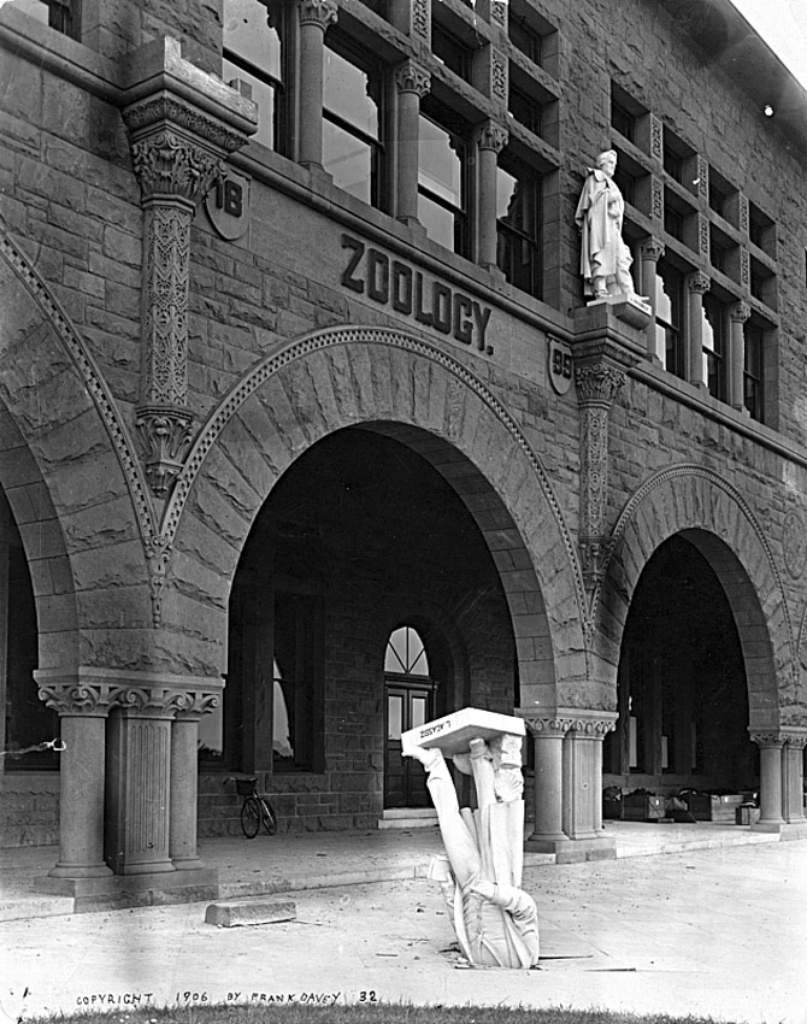
After the 1906 San Francisco earthquake toppled the statue from the façade of Stanford's zoology building, Stanford President David Starr Jordan wrote that "Somebody‍—‌Dr. Angell, perhaps‍—‌remarked that 'Agassiz was great in the abstract but not in the concrete.'"

During the 1906 San Francisco earthquake, the statue, made of marble, fell from the second floor of the zoology building. The New York Times' Rebecca Stott writes, "The great scientist, with his head buried in concrete, his upturned body sticking up into air, became an iconic image of the earthquake." The statue was not damaged.

In 2020, the Stanford Department of Psychology requested to remove the statue from the front façade of its building due to his support of polygenism. The statue was removed in October 2020.

== See also ==
- List of monuments and memorials removed during the George Floyd protests
