= Lith =

Lith or LITH may refer to:

- Lith print, a type of photographic printing process
- Lith, Netherlands, a town in the Netherlands
- Al Lith, a city in Saudi Arabia
- Lake in the Hills, Illinois, a village in the United States
- The Institute of Technology at Linköping University (LiTH), Swedish faculty of science and engineering
- Lith., an abbreviation for Lithuania
- A standing stone
- Coccolith

== See also ==
- van der Lith and van Lith, Dutch-language surnames
- LithTech, a game engine developed by Monolith Productions
- Lith Payam, a Dinka community located in Jonglei State in South Sudan
- Lithium, a chemical element
