= Renty Taylor =

Slave in the United States (c. 1775 - after 1866)

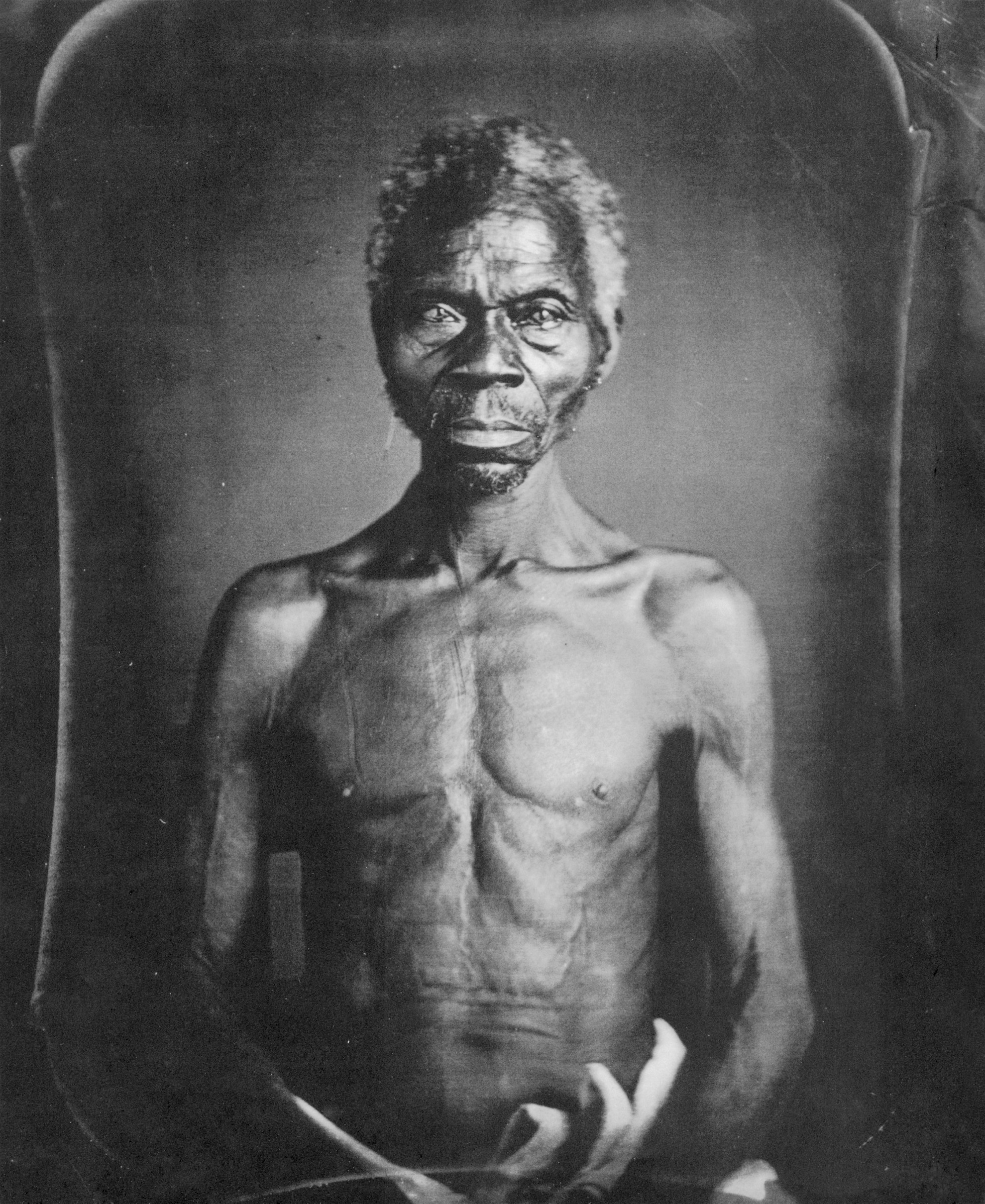
- Renty Taylor in March 1850 (aged roughly 75)
- Born: Unknown name c. 1775; Congo Basin, Africa
- Died: unknown; after c. 1866 (aged at least 91) probably Columbia, South Carolina
- Other names: Renty Thomson, Papa Renty
- Occupation: enslaved
- Known for: Being one of the subjects of the oldest known photo of an enslaved person.
- Children: Delia Taylor (fl. March 1850–52); Renty Thompson (1850–1945)

Renty Taylor (c. 1775 – after c. 1866), also known as Papa Renty, was a man born in the Congo Basin. He was captured and brought to the United States, where he was sold as a slave. He worked on a cotton plantation owned by Benjamin Franklin Taylor (1791-1852). He was one of the subjects of the oldest known photographs of slaves, which were taken in March 1850 by Joseph T. Zealy under the commission of Harvard biologist Louis Agassiz, whose ideas were used to support scientific racism and later racial segregation.

== Biography ==
Renty Taylor's life has little documentation; the main source of his life is the oral history given by people who claim to be his descendants. According to them he was born around 1775 in the Congo Basin and was taken to New Orleans on a Spanish slave ship when he was around 15. His original birth name is unknown. He was eventually purchased by Col. Thomas Taylor (1743–1833) during the early 1800s and he later made his way to the Edgehill plantation at Columbia, South Carolina. It is said that he was a leader of his community and with a Webster’s Blue Back Speller he taught himself and other slaves how to read, despite anti-literacy laws in the United States.

In March 1850, Louis Agassiz commissioned Joseph T. Zealy to produce daguerreotypes showcasing the anatomy of Black people, Zealy would photograph Renty Taylor, his daughter Delia Taylor, as well as other slaves at his studio in Columbia, South Carolina. These are the earliest known photographs of enslaved people in the United States. While Agassiz was anti-slavery (because of opposition to miscegenation) he was also a proponent of scientific-racism and intended to use the photographs to support this view. Agassiz left the images to Harvard University, and they remained at the Peabody Museum until 1976 when they were re-discovered by Ellie Reichlin.

In 1852, Renty and his daughter were listed by name among the people enslaved by Benjamin Franklin Taylor in a probate inventory. He eventually took on the name Renty Taylor sometime after the end of the American Civil War. It is unknown when he died and it is also unknown if he was ever freed, although he disappeared from records around 1866, which was three years after Abraham Lincoln had passed the Emancipation Proclamation.

In the 21st century it was proposed by Swiss historian Hans Fässler to rename the mountain Agassizhorn to Rentyhorn after Renty Taylor, however this has been rejected by the Swiss government.

== Personal life ==
Renty Taylor had one confirmed child: a daughter named Delia Taylor who was also photographed by Zealy. He may have also had a son named Renty Thompson (1850–1945) who was sold to a different enslaver in 1860, though Harvard University disputes that they were related.

== Lawsuit ==
In 2019, Taylor's alleged descendants sued Harvard for the return of the images and unspecified damages. The lawsuit was supported by forty-three living descendants of Louis Agassiz, they wrote a letter of support that read in part "For Harvard to give the daguerreotypes to Ms. Lanier and her family would begin to make amends for its use of the photos as exhibits for the white supremacist theory Agassiz espoused”, and that everyone must evaluate fully "his role in promoting a pseudoscientific justification for white supremacy." Asked what she would do with the images if she won the case, Tamara Lanier, Renty Taylor's great-great-great-granddaughter stated: "I know that this is something that should be in the public domain, and Harvard should not be profiting from the use of these images, and beyond that, it's a matter of dignity and restoring the dignity to Renty."

Lanier v. Harvard was dismissed in 2021, on multiple grounds, including the common law principle that the subject of a photograph holds no property rights in the photo. Lanier appealed shortly afterwards.

In May 2025, Harvard agreed to give the daguerrotypes to the International African American Museum in South Carolina. Ms. Lanier was paid an undisclosed sum of money as part of her lawsuit alleging Harvard caused her emotional harm. Despite the undisclosed monetary settlement, Harvard maintains its position that Ms. Lanier has not proven her genealogical connection to Renty Taylor. The photographs were finally transferred to the International African American Museum on 11 March 2026.

== Documentary ==
- The World Is Watching: Woman Suing Harvard for Photos of Enslaved Ancestors Says History Is At Stake (Video-Interview with Tamara Lanier, the great-great-great-granddaughter of Papa Renty), Democracy Now!, 29 March 2019
