= Hans Fässler =

Swiss historian, politician, satirical revue artist, activist and teacher

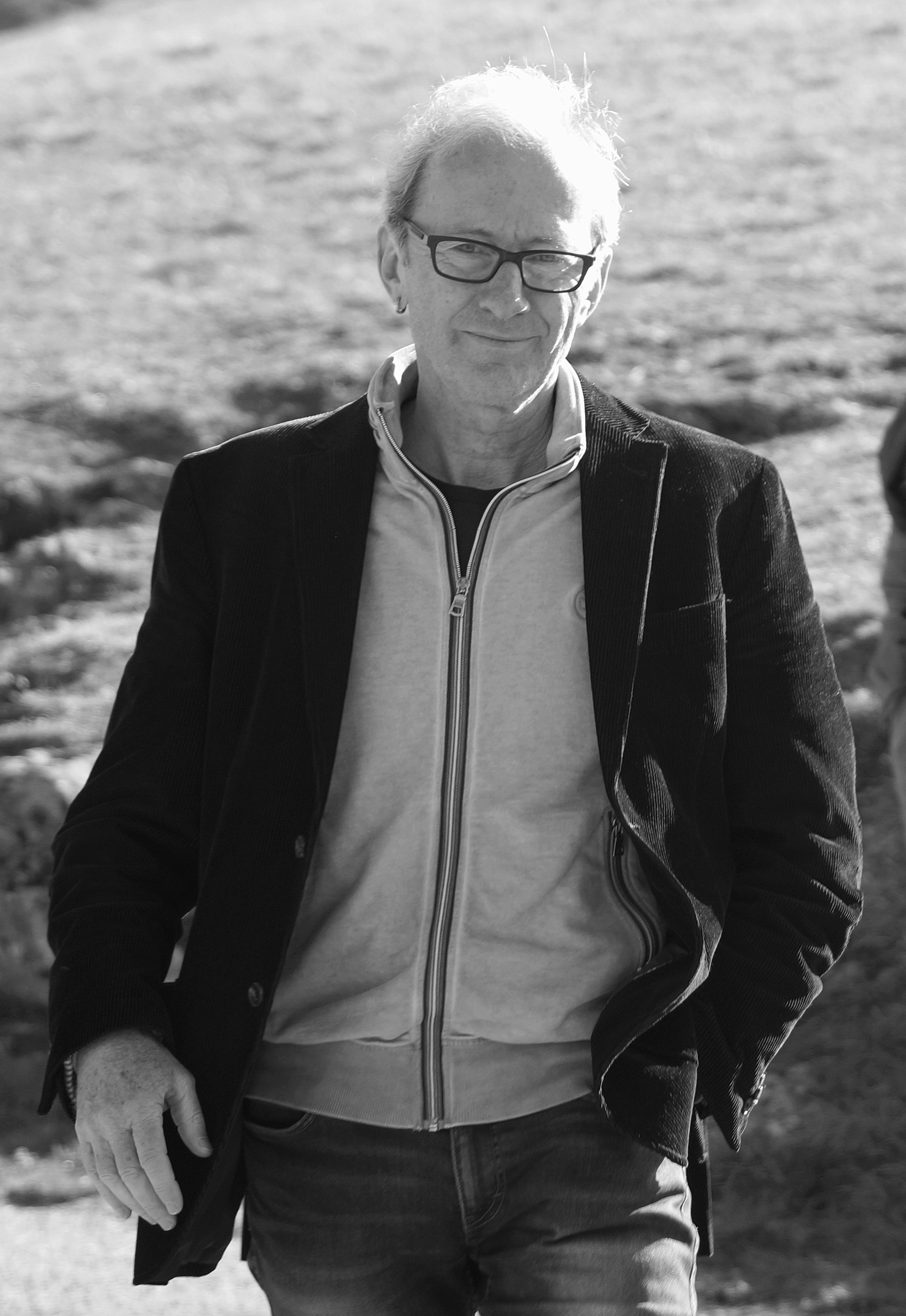
Hans Fässler on Fort de Joux (2017)

Hans Fässler (born 27 February 1954) is a Swiss historian, politician (Social Democratic Party of Switzerland, SPS), satirical revue artist, political activist and teacher of English. He has been involved in both political institutions and grassroots movements and writes articles for various newspapers, magazines and other publications.

== Biography ==
Hans Fässler was born in 1954 in St. Gallen and grew up in the Lachen neighbourhood in the west of the city. On his mother's side, his family came from the canton of Glarus, on his father's side from the Appenzell region. He attended Feldli primary school and Schönau secondary school and then entered Burggraben state grammar school in 1969, from which he graduated with A-levels ("Matura B") in 1973. He went on to study English Language and Literature, General History and British-American History at the University of Zurich and, after a one-year language stay in Penarth (South Wales), graduated with an MA in English and History and a Master of Advanced Studies in Secondary and Higher Education. His MA paper analysed the imagery of reform and revolution in the works of Percy B. Shelley. Hans Fässler has been a translator and an interpreter, and he has worked in pre-school, primary, grammar school, vocational, and adult education, both as a supply teacher and a teacher of English, German, History, and general education subjects.

From 1992–2018 he was a teacher of English at the state grammar school of the canton of Appenzell Ausserrhoden in Trogen. He is the father of two adult sons and is married for the second time. His leisure activities included volleyball (i.e. first league with STV St. Gallen volleyball club) and mountaineering (first direct ascent of the Öhrli west face in the Alpstein range).

== Historical research ==
=== Toussaint Louverture and Haiti ===
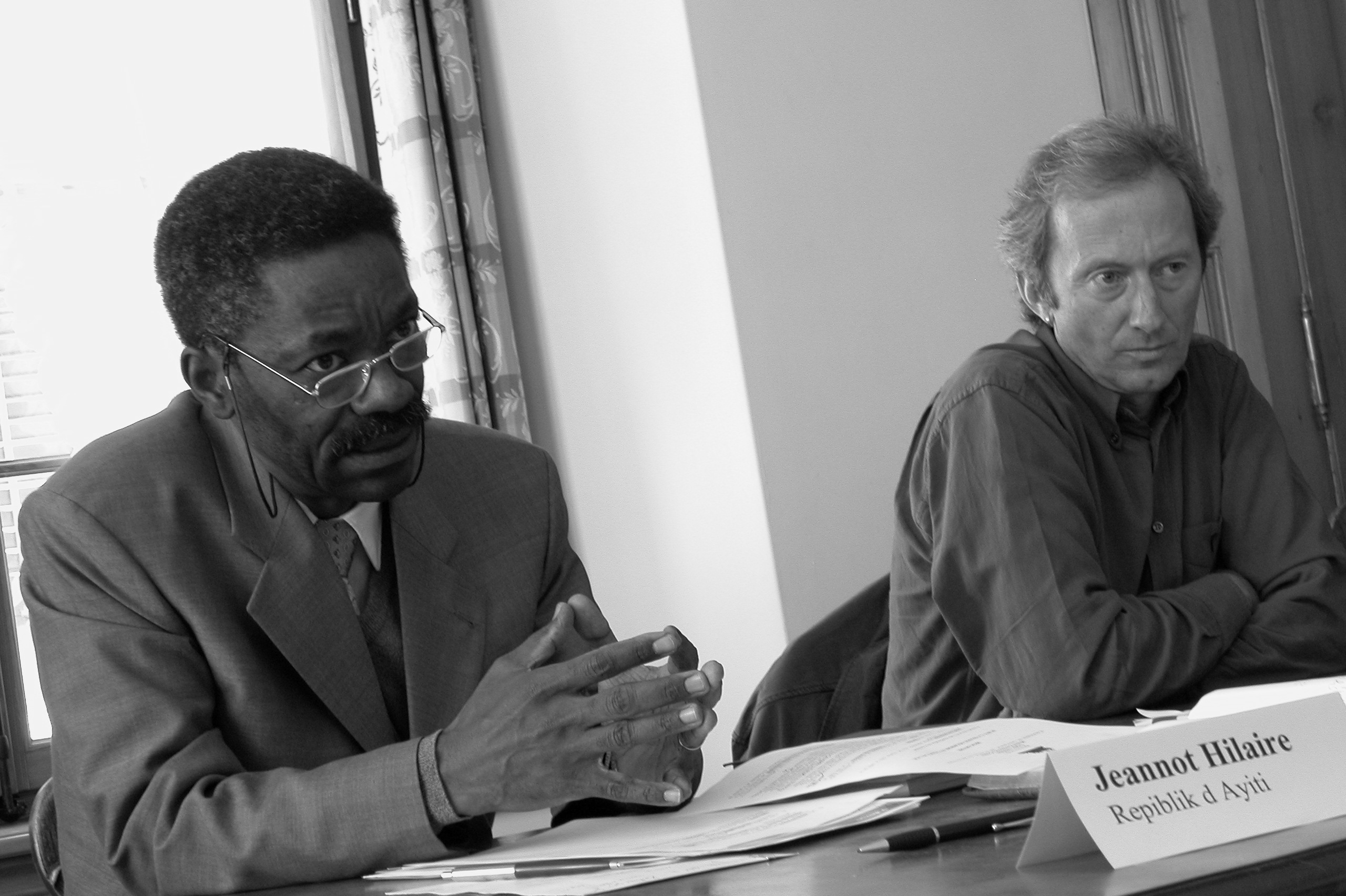
Jeannot Hilaire (historian and Haiti's UN representative in Geneva) and Hans Fässler in Trogen, 2003

For the 200th anniversary of the canton of St. Gallen (2003), Hans Fässler created the politico-satirical revue "Louverture died in 1803" with financial support from 'Pro Helvetia', the Swiss arts and culture foundation. Research on its historical background led him to study the history of Toussaint Louverture, Haiti, slavery, and of Swiss participation in slavery. In 2005, he published the results of his research in his book "Reise in Schwarz-Weiss. Schweizer Ortstermine in Sachen Sklaverei" (Travels in Black and White. Local Appointments in Matters of Slavery). The book was translated into French and published 2007 by Duboiris in Paris under the title "Une Suisse esclavagiste. Voyage dans un pays au-dessus de tout soupçon" with a foreword by Doudou Diène (former UN Special Rapporteur on contemporary forms of racism, racial discrimination, xenophobia and related intolerance).

=== Postcolonial Research ===
Since then, Hans Fässler has devoted himself to the fields of slavery, (post-)colonial studies, reparation and anti-black racism, both as a journalist and a public speaker. He has tried to incorporate historical research-results into current political discourse and vice versa. For example, in the context of the debate on Switzerland as a colonial society without colonies, which began towards the end of the 1990s, he has launched numerous political initiatives at federal, cantonal and municipal levels. Political journeys took him to Haiti (Port-au-Prince) in 2003, to France (Atlantic and triangular trade ports La Rochelle, Nantes, Bordeaux) in 2007 and 2008, to the Senegal (Dakar and Djilor) in 2005 and 2008, to French Guiana (Saint-Laurent-du-Maroni) in 2013., and to Antigua in 2019. In spring 2019, Hans Fässler started to offer guided tours «On the Traces of Racism» and «On 'Race War' and Class War» in St. Gallen.

=== Demounting Louis Agassiz ===
Since 2007, he has been working with the Transatlantic Committee "Demounting Louis Agassiz", which he founded in order to reassess the Swiss glaciologist and natural scientist Louis Agassiz (1807-1873). This process has involved both the Swiss Alpine Club (SAC), which appointed Agassiz as an honorary member in 1865., and the Historical Dictionary of Switzerland (HDS), where a new Agassiz entry is due to Fribourg-based Romance studies graduate Hans Barth. Hans Fässler is in close cooperation with the Swiss-Haitian-Finnish artist Sasha Huber. In 2012, the exhibition "Glaciologist, Racist: Louis Agassiz (1807-2012)", which was conceived and researched together with typographer Hannah Traber and Hans Barth, was on display for the first time in Grindelwald's Museum of Local History. The repercussions of this exhibition travelled as far as Boston. It is also largely due to initiatives by Barth and Fässler that in September 2018 the city and the university of Neuchâtel decided to rename 'Espace Louis Agassiz' and call it 'Espace Tilo Frey'. The renaming was carried out on 6 June 2019.

=== Addressing Switzerland and Slavery ===
In his most recent campaign, he has urged the City of Chicago to reassess Swiss Bank UBS's degree of compliance with the Slavery Era Disclosure Ordinance and to analyse whether or not failure to comply with this ordinance shall deem any contracts with UBS voidable on behalf of the city. The said ordinance is the work of Alderman Dorothy Tillman, who sponsored the bill in 2003. After the case of Swiss merchant-banker Jakob Laurenz Gsell (1815–1896), Fässler is referring to the case of Swiss merchant Johann Ulrich Zellweger (1804–1871), who made large profits from Cuban sugar slavery and the slave trade and later became the founder of a UBS predecessor bank. In November 2019, Hans Fässler founded the "Swiss Committee on Reparations for Slavery" (SCORES), which consists of about 100 personalities from or in Switzerland who are in favour of reparations for slavery (also by Switzerland). In December 2019, he was able to announce this foundation publicly for the first time in a speech at a UN meeting in Geneva. To support the demand for Swiss reparations and to document Swiss slavery relations, Hans Fässler, together with fellow historian Klaus Stuckert, maintains the CARICOM Compilation Archive, arguably the most comprehensive collection of Swiss slavery relations with the Caribbean and beyond.

In 2026, Hans Fässler authored the expert opinion «Zurich, Berne, Solothurn, Slavery 1719–1839» in connection with the criminal complaint filed by Shelley Moorhead (US Virgin Islands) against the cantons of Zurich, Berne, and Solothurn for aiding and abetting slavery.

== Political career ==
=== Party Politics ===
During his grammar school years, Hans Fässler was active in a right-wing student group with, amongst others, Konrad Hummler, Adrian Rüesch, and Valentin Landmann. In 1978, in the context of a re-establishment of the local chapter of the "Young Socialists" (JUSO), he joined the Social Democratic Party (SP) of the City of St. Gallen. In 1979 he became a member of the Swiss Union of Public Service Personnel. From 1980 onwards, he was under political surveillance from the cantonal police intelligence service of St.Gallen and from the city of Zurich, while secret files also existed in the Office of the Attorney General of Switzerland and in the security service of the armed forces. In 1984 he was elected to the cantonal legislature of St. Gallen, of which he was a member until 1994. From 1986 to 1993, Hans Fässler was party and parliamentary group secretary of the SP of the canton of St. Gallen.

=== Activism ===
In 1986, legal proceedings against him for violating military secrets were suspended on grounds of parliamentary immunity. In the context of an anti-apartheid movement picket against the local branch of UBS, the District Court of St. Gallen acquitted him in 1989 from a charge of violating Article 292 of the Swiss Criminal Code. In 1990 he was convicted and fined for breach of the peace and coercion during a sit-in blockade against work in progress for the Neuchlen-Anschwilen military training ground. Hans Fässler contributed to the preamble to the constitution of the canton of St. Gallen as part of the working group conference in 2001. From 2005 to 2009, he was president of the teachers' union (KKK) of the state grammar school in Trogen and a member of the trade union negotiating delegation to the canton's social partnership conference.

=== Grassroots ===
Outside the institutional framework, Hans Fässler has been active in various political contexts: He was co-initiator of the popular initiative "For a Switzerland without an Army" as well as for the municipal popular initiative "For a City without Cars" in St. Gallen. As a founding member of the "Justice for Paul Grüninger" association, he helped to rehabilitate the man who had saved the lives of hundreds of Jewish refugees by allowing them to enter Switzerland illegally. This rehabilitation eventually led to the foundation of the "Paul Grüninger Foundation" in 1998. Together with the St. Gallen anti-apartheid movement, Hans Fässler succeeded in having Krügerstrasse, where ANC representative Dulcie September spoke to the press in 1986, renamed in 2009. The street, which is located in the Vonwil neighbourhood and was reminiscent of the South African apartheid pioneer Paul "Ohm" Krüger, is now named after the Swiss author Friedrich Dürrenmatt.

== Political Satire and Songwriting ==
=== Folk to Satire ===
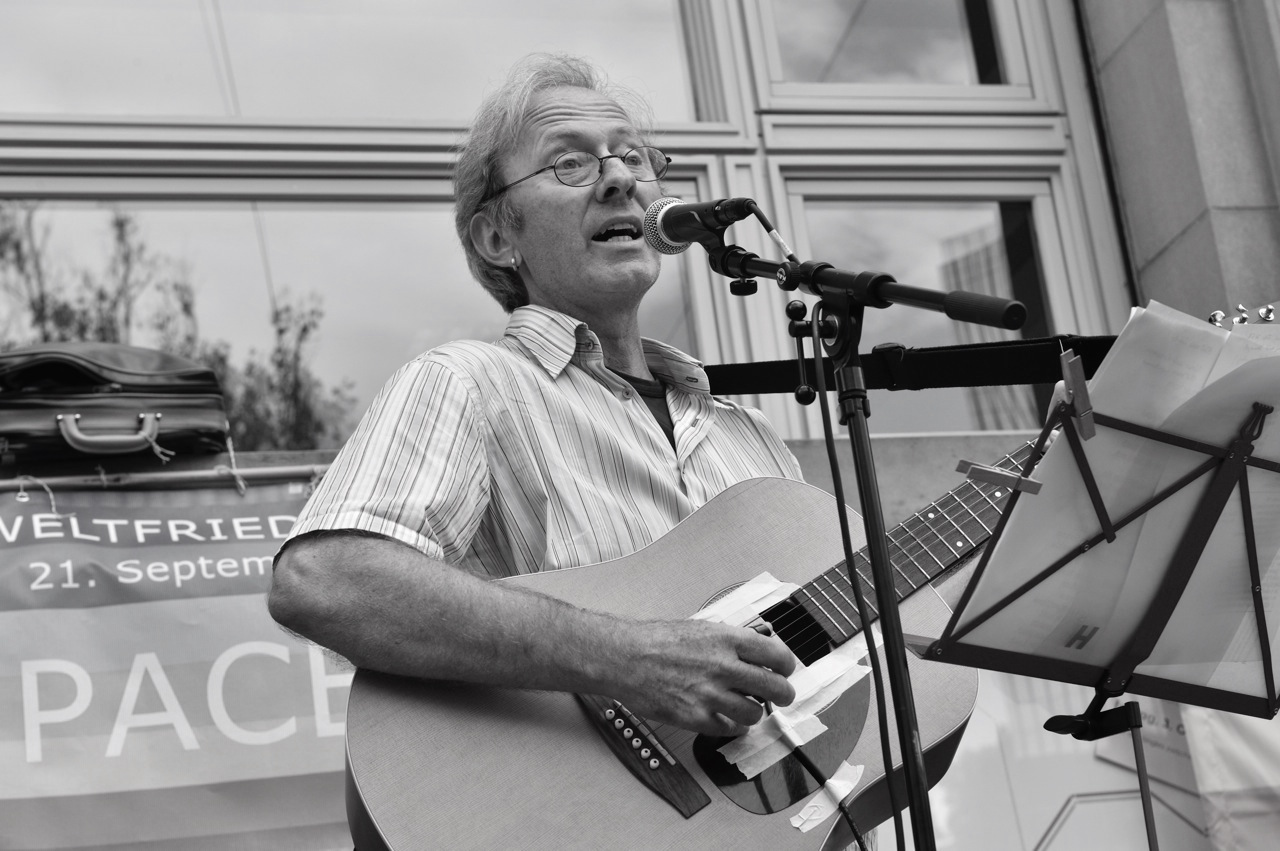
Hans Fässler sings for the International Day of Peace demonstration in St. Gallen, 2014

In the 1970s, Hans Fässler played with various Swiss folk groups (Troubadix, Zupfgyge) as a guitarist, lyricist, and singer. The groups performed in small theatres, folk clubs, and at festivals (Lenzburg, Gurten). In 1980, he wrote and performed his first one-man politico-satirical revue "CCCP – Chalte Chrieg Cabaretistisches Programm" (Cold War – Cabaret Programme). Invited by the Swiss clown Richard Hirzel ("Pic"), he was able to present his parodistic song "Hinterm Böhmerwald" ("Behind the Bohemian Forest") on Swiss television on the show "Schauplatz" on 9 January 1987.

=== Satirical Revues ===
In 1986, Hans Fässler's politico-satirical revue "Speed – Fascism – Motorway" triggered a minor theatre scandal, because its performance on the municipal theatre's studio stage was concurrent with St. Gallen's city motorway being opened to traffic. "Nicht ganz hundert – Anmerkungen zur Armee 95", which satirised trends manifested in contemporary society and in the project for a Swiss army reform, premiered in 1991 at the cultural and educational festival "Summer Universality" at Neuchlen-Anschwilen. In the following years, this show was performed some fifty times throughout German-speaking Switzerland. "Old and New Routines for Old and New Friends " was the title of the full-length satirical revue for 2000/2001, followed by the historical revue "Louverture died in 1803", which was performed more than thirty times in 2003/2004. Apart from full-length revues, Hans Fässler has every now and then produced satirical routines ("Gebrauchskabarett") for demonstrations, congresses, conferences and annual meetings. For one year, under the pen-name "Leo N. Hart", he wrote a weekly column called "Das Wort zum Freitag" (His Word on Friday) in the socialist and trade union newspaper OAZ. Hans Fässler has also written political poems, speeches, and satirical columns, and he has contributed texts for the comedy group "Die Schimpfoniker" from Altstätten. After a long break (since «Louverture stirbt 1803»), Fässler went on stage again on 24 June 2020 with a new full-length programme. He read from his book «Nicht ohne meinen Carbonschuh. Eine Toggenburger Passion», which put the Swiss ski jumper Simon Ammann into a context of professional sports, sponsoring, changing languages and the culture of the Toggenburg region.

=== Political Songwriting ===
Since 2009 he has been performing on and off at venues around Switzerland as a solo singer and guitarist – and sometimes together with Werner Meier (violin), Jürg Surber (double bass), and Jens Weber (tenor). Under the Robert Burns motto "For A'That", he considers it his mission to keep alive all kinds of political songs (work-songs, revolutionary songs, protest songs, songs of resistance).

== Selected publications ==
=== Books ===
- Reise in Schwarz-Weiss. Schweizer Ortstermine zur Sklaverei. Rotpunktverlag, Zürich 2005, ISBN 978-3858693037.
- Une Suisse esclavagiste. Voyage dans un pays au-dessus de tout soupçon (avec un préface de Doudou Diène, ancien rapporteur spécial de l'ONU sur le racisme et la discrimination raciale). Duboiris, Paris 2007, ISBN 978-2-916872-04-9.
- What's in a Name? Louis Agassiz, his mountain and the politics of remembrance. In: Sasha Huber (ed.), Rentyhorn, Kiasma, Helsinki 2010, ISBN 978-951-53-3267-7, pp. 8–21.
- Un colonel suisse au combat contre les Marrons au Suriname. In: Jean Moomou (Hrsg.): Sociétés marronnes des Amériques. Mémoires, patrimoines, identités et histoire du XVIIe au XXe siècles. Ibis Rouge Editions, Matoury, Guayane, 2015, ISBN 978-2-84450-451-7, S. 61-67.
- Message to Max on the State of Colonial Matters and Other News. In: Museum für Gestaltung, Bettina Richter (Hg.): Talking Bodies. Image, Power, Impact. Lars Müller Publishers, Zurich 2023, 64–75.

=== Magazines ===
- Die Schweiz und die Sklaverei. Eidgenossen bereicherten sich an Sklaven in Lateinamerika. In: Lateinamerika Nachrichten, January 2006.
- Time to change the mountain named after a racist. In: Swissinfo, 16 June 2016.

=== Newspapers ===
- Max Frisch und Léopold Senghor. Ein interkulturelles Lehrmittel verbindet die Schweiz mit Senegal. In: St. Galler Tagblatt, 19 March 2007
- Zürcher Sklavereiakten. Der Streit um die gesperrten Dokumente bei der Credit Suisse ist mehr als ein Streit unter HistorikerInnen. Was der Leu mit Afrika zu tun hat. In: Die Wochenzeitung, 25 March 2010
- Der Schatten fällt auf uns alle. Schon im 19. Jahrhundert sahen viele die Sklaverei als Übel an. In: Tages-Anzeiger, 14 July 2017

== Literature ==
- Vanda Janka in an interview with Hans Fässler: Sklaverei: Auch die Schweiz war aktiv beteiligt. In: Swissinfo, 22 August 2003
- Isabelle Eichenberger: Comment la Suisse a profité de l'esclavage. In: Swissinfo, 7 January 2008
- Res Strehle: Die Sklaven der Familie Escher. In: Das Magazin, 8 July 2017
