= Wernyol =

- Town
- Location within South Sudan
- Coordinates: 7°19′55″N 31°24′49″E
- Country: South Sudan
- Region: Greater Upper Nile
- State: Jonglei State
- County: Twic East County
- Payam: Lith Payam

Wernyol is the largest town in the Twic East County of Jonglei State in the Greater Upper Nile region of South Sudan. It is in the center of Jonglei state and close to the White Nile River.

== Population ==
An approximate population of 35,000 people live in and around Wernyol. There are many tribes living in former Lith community, which consists of Kongor, Adhiok, Ayual, Dacheck, Awulian and Abek. Lith Payam headquarters is Wernyol, which consists of two tribes: Adhiok and Abek.

Wernyol is the seat of the Anglican Diocese of Wernyol belonging to the Province of the Episcopal Church of South Sudan.

== Climate ==
Wernyol city's climate is divided into four seasons the wet rainy (winter), hot dry (summer), spring, and the autumn.

== Industry ==
The main industry in Wernyol city is agriculture. Many people are farmers who keep cattle, sheep and poultry. Others are fishermen on the White Nile River.
