= Xylocrius agassizi =

Scientific classification
- Kingdom: Animalia
- Phylum: Arthropoda
- Class: Insecta
- Order: Coleoptera
- Suborder: Polyphaga
- Infraorder: Cucujiformia
- Family: Cerambycidae
- Genus: Xylocrius
- Species: X. agassizi

Binomial name
- Xylocrius agassizi (LeConte, 1861)

Species of beetle

Xylocrius agassizi is a species of beetle in the family Cerambycidae.
