= Lith Payam =

Dinka community in Jonglei State, South Sudan

Lith Payam, also known as Jieng Lith Payam, is a Dinka community located in Jonglei State in South Sudan. Lith Payam borders on Kongor Payam, Pibor County, Duk County, and the White Nile. Lith Payam headquarters is located at Wernyol City.

Two clans known as Abek and Adhiok inhab Lith Payam. Adhiok society is a southern Sudanese community found in Lith Payam (shared by Adhiok and Abek) in Twich-East County and in Jonglei state of South Sudan. Adhiok is geographically located in Wernyol City. Adhiok residents are believed to have migrated from some nearby neighboring societies of Twic East County in South Sudan.

The long war in Sudan led concerned Australians to form an ASA organization to help south Sudanese refugees resume a normal way of life. The organisation is involved in education, employment, and training.
