= Tilo Frey =

Swiss politician (1923–2008)

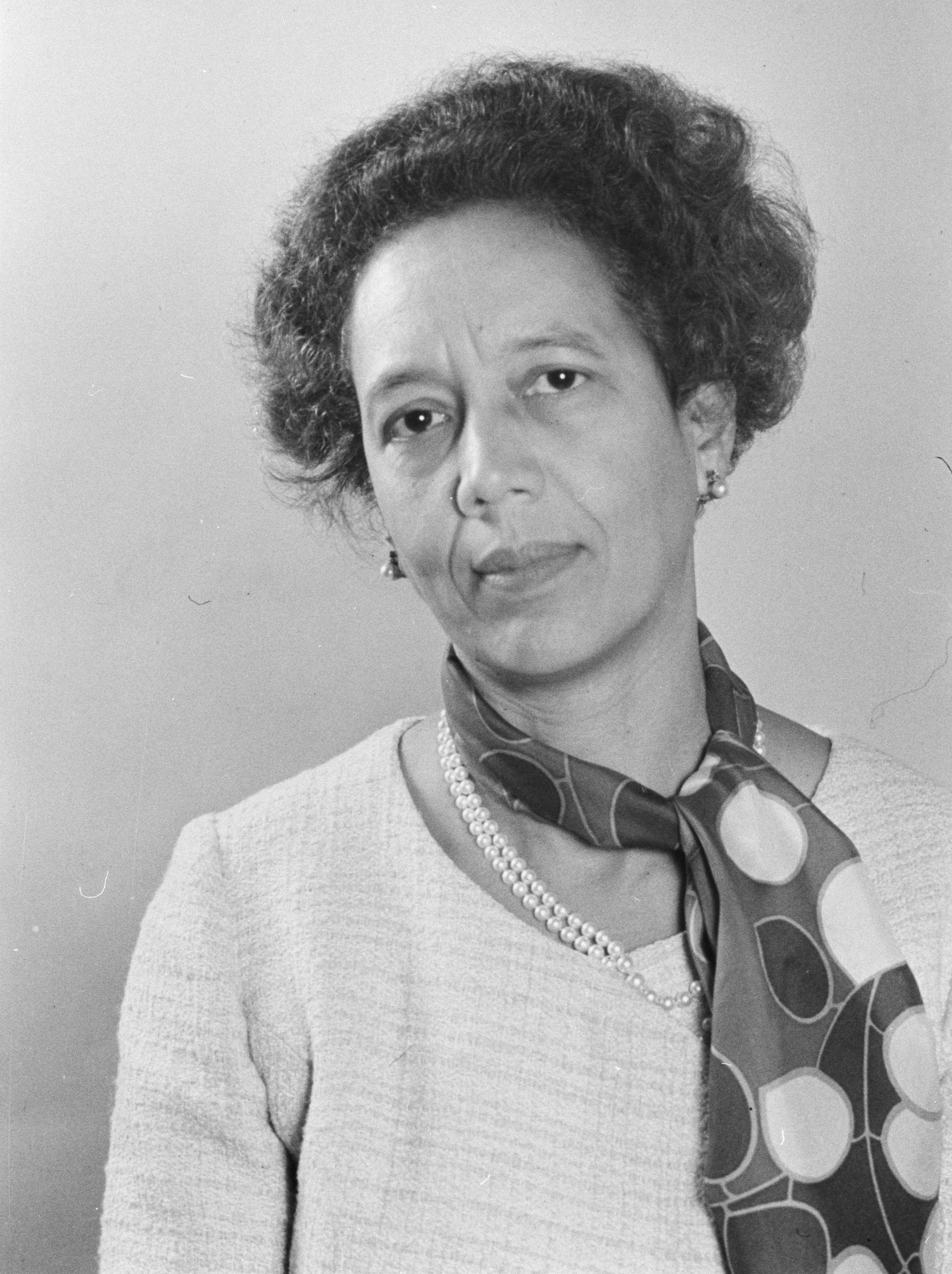

Member of the National Council of Switzerland
- In office 29 November 1971 – 30 November 1975

Personal details
- Born: Tilo Frey; 2 May 1923 Maroua, French Cameroon
- Died: 27 June 2008 (aged 85) Neuchâtel, Switzerland
- Party: Free Democratic Party of Switzerland

Tilo Frey (2 May 1923 – 27 June 2008)) was a Swiss politician. She was one of the first twelve women elected to the National Council in 1971 and was the first person of African descent elected to the National Council. Prior to her service at the federal level, she was a member of the municipal council of Neuchâtel and the Grand Council of Neuchâtel.

== Early life and education ==
Frey was born in Maroua, Cameroon, as the daughter of a Swiss father, Paul Frey of Brugg, and a Fula mother, Fatimatou Bibabadama. She was adopted by Katscha Frey. As a mixed-race child in Switzerland, Frey faced considerable racism. Even her father advised her to "act as white as a lily". She attended school in Canton Neuchatel and vocational school in Neuchatel from 1938 – 1941.

== Professional career ==
From 1943 to 1971 she taught business classes at the Ecole de commerce of Neuchâtel. After her political career came to an end, she returned to teaching and from 1976 to 1984, she was director of the Ecole professionnelle de jeunes filles.

== Political career ==
She became active in politics in 1959 once the Canton of Neuchâtel gave women the right to vote and run for public office. She joined the Free Democratic Party of Switzerland (FDP) and was elected into the municipal council of Neuchâtel in 1964. When she was elected to the Grand Council of Neuchâtel 1969, she became the first person of color to serve in that body. In a referendum of 1971, Swiss voters approved giving women the right to vote and to stand for office. Frey entered the race for the National Council in the 1971 Swiss federal election and won a seat as a member of the FDP, joining nine other women who entered the council. Media coverage at the time was heavily focused on her race during the campaign. In 1974 she resigned from municipal council in Neuchâtel. She was not re-elected to the National Council in the 1975 election. Among her key issues were equal pay for woman and legalized abortion.

Frey died on 27 June 2008 in her hometown of Neuchâtel at the age of 85.

== Legacy ==
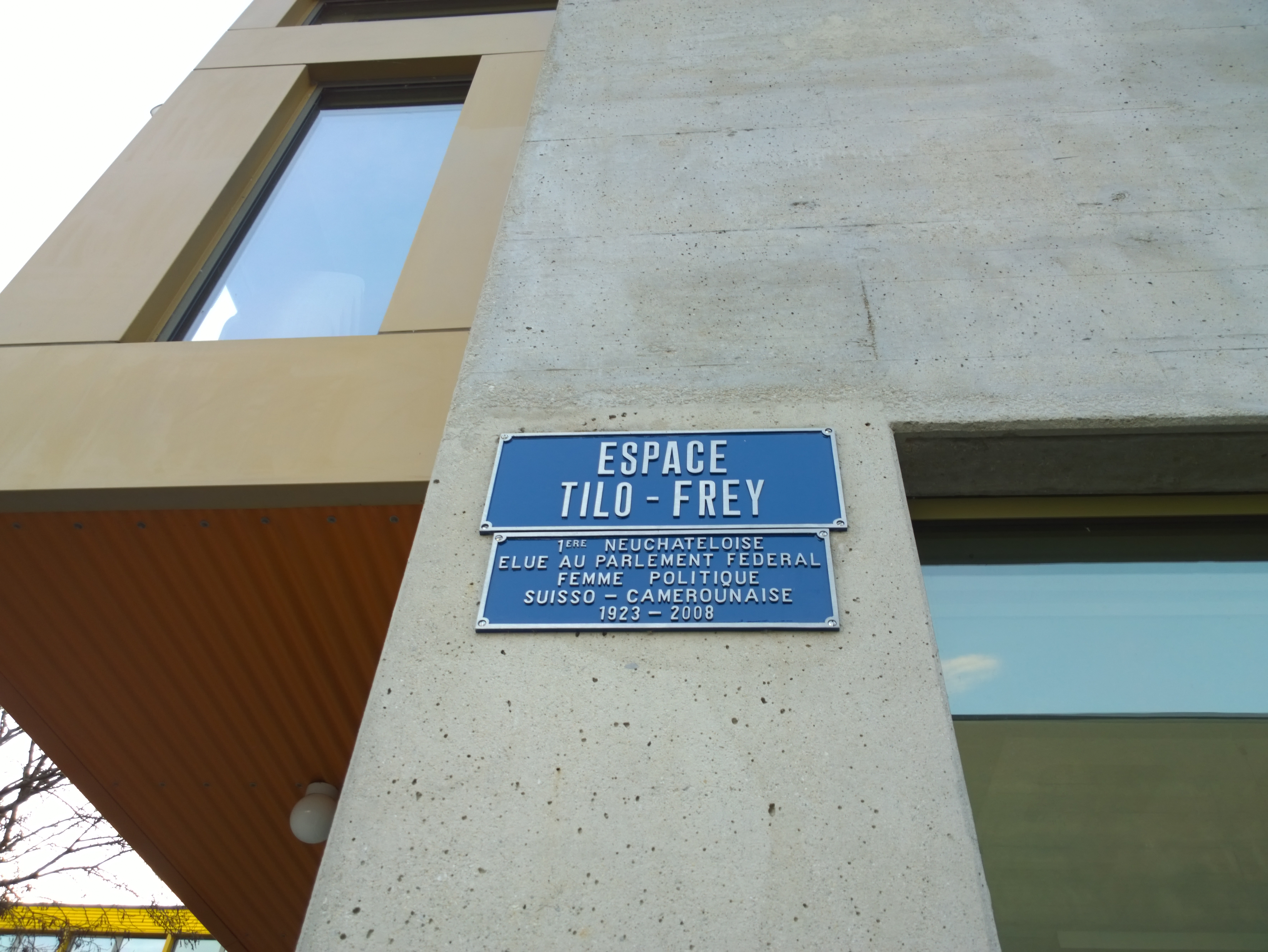
Espace Tilo-Frey in Neuchâtel

In June 2019, Neuchâtel changed the name of Espace Louis-Agassiz, near the Faculty of Letters of the University of Neuchâtel area, to Espace Tilo Frey. Louis Agassiz was a professor of natural history and glaciology at University of Neuchâtel. He is now recognized as having held and propagated racist views, having published work on polygenism that claimed a ranking of the races in which blacks were inferior to whites and defended racial segregation.

== See also ==
- List of the first female holders of political offices in Europe
