= Frank Angell =

American psychologist (1857–1939)

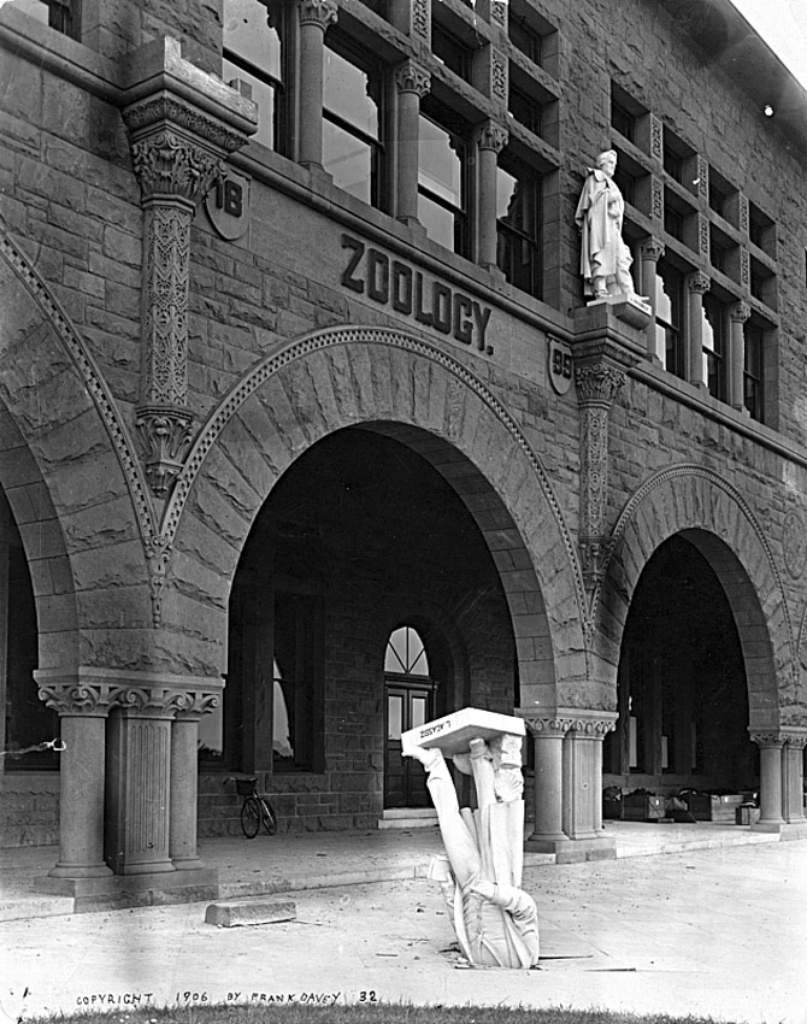
After the 1906 San Francisco earthquake toppled Louis Agassiz's statue from the façade of Stanford's zoology building, Stanford President David Starr Jordan wrote that "Somebody‍—‌Dr. Angell, perhaps‍—‌remarked that 'Agassiz was great in the abstract but not in the concrete.'"

Frank Angell (July 8, 1857 – November 2, 1939) was an American psychologist and the former athletic director at Stanford University.

== Biography ==
Angell was born in 1857 in Scituate, Rhode Island. He graduated from the University of Vermont with an undergraduate degree in 1878. Angell spent several years teaching high school physics in Washington, DC. He earned his PhD in the Leipzig laboratory of Wilhelm Wundt. He then founded the experimental psychology laboratories at Cornell University (1891) and Stanford University (1892). He remained at Stanford for the rest of his career, working primarily on psychophysics and as director of athletics. A track stadium at Stanford was named after him.

He was the nephew of University of Michigan president James B. Angell, and cousin of Yale University president James R. Angell.

Angell in 1891 married Louise Lee Bayard (died 1944), daughter of Secretary of State Thomas F. Bayard. Mrs. Bayard entered into a Hollywood acting career in the 1920s after bearing three children: Charles (died 1949), Thomas Bayard Angell, and daughter Mabel.
