= Van der Lith =

van der Lith and van Lith are surnames of Dutch origin. Notable people with the names include:

- Charlotta Elisabeth van der Lith (1700–1753), a plantation owner in Dutch Surinam
- Dries van der Lith (fl. 1990s), South African air force pilot
- Hailey Van Lith (born 2001), American basketball player
- Frans van Lith, (1863–1926), Dutch Jesuit priest
- Jean van Lith (fl. 1950s), French aviator of the Van Lith VI
