= The Monoliths (Manchester-by-the-Sea) =

Park in Massachusetts, US

Coordinates: 42°35′46.81″N 70°46′2.75″W

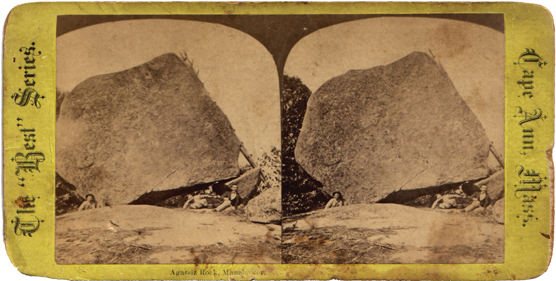
An 1870s stereoview depicting Little Rock

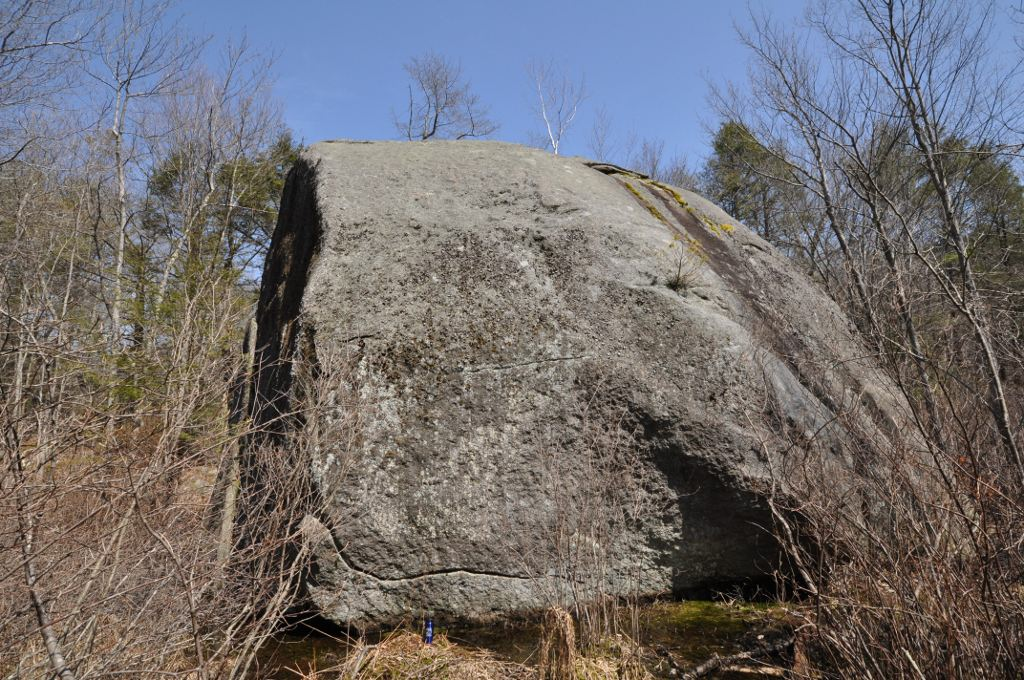
Big Rock in 2013

The Monoliths, also known as Agassiz Rock, is a 116-acre (47 ha) park in Manchester-by-the-Sea, Massachusetts, owned and maintained by The Trustees of Reservations. The park's name is from two examples of large glacial erratic boulders plucked from bedrock. As glaciers scoured this landscape, the mass of bedrock forming the hill proved more resistant than the surrounding soil, forcing the bottom of the glacier up and over the hill. The north side was smoothed and the south side left steep and rugged as the glacier broke off chunks of rock as it passed.

Little Rock is a granite monolith on one of the trails. It rests on a small jagged stone, leaving an opening below. A short distance away, other boulders lie perched on the edge of this glaciated upland. Below, in a small shrub swamp, rests thirty-foot-tall Big Rock. Its depth is unknown.

The trail to the site is a one-mile loop that passes both Big and Little rocks. Following long periods of rain the area surrounding Big Rock often floods.

== History ==
In 1874, a group of students named this site to honor Louis Agassiz, the Harvard University professor who first theorized that the rocks that dot New England's landscape were shaped and deposited by glaciers.

Agassiz visited the site and found the erratic physical features fit his hypothesis. Prior to Agassiz's hypothesis, it was widely believed that the scattering of rocks throughout New England were the result of Noah's flood. The rock is often used as a type example of a glacial erratic.

The first parcel on the site was donated in 1957. There were subsequent gifts and purchases in 1958, 1960, 1961, 1963, 1964, 1966, 1967 and 2001.

In 2020, The Trustees of Reservations announced plans to change the name of the property, citing what a news report called "increasing public discomfort with the legacy of the property’s namesake". In 2022, the rename was complete.
