= Sarrig =

Sarrig or Sar Rig (Persian: سرريگ), also rendered as Sarig, Sarriq and Sarrik, may refer to:

- Sar Rig, Bandar Abbas, Hormozgan Province
- Sar Rig, Minab, Hormozgan Province
- Sar Rig, Qeshm, Hormozgan Province
- Sar Rig-e Dum, Hormozgan Province
- Sar Rig-e Owl, Hormozgan Province
- Sar Rig-e Sum, Hormozgan Province
- Sar Rig, Kerman
- Sarrig, Sistan and Baluchestan
