= Qadamgah (disambiguation) =

Qadamgah is a city in Razavi Khorasan Province, Iran.

Qadamgah may also refer to:

- Qadamgah, East Azerbaijan
- Qadamgah, Arsanjan, Fars Province
- Qadamgah, Bavanat, Fars Province
- Qadamgah, Mamasani, Fars Province
- Qadamgah, Marvdasht, Fars Province
- Qadamgah, Hormozgan
- Qadamgah, Markazi
- Qadamgah, South Khorasan
- Qadamgah (ancient site), an Achaemenid rock-cut structure
- Qadamgah Hazrat Ali, A historical place in Khalilabad County, Iran

== See also ==
- Qadamgah-e Bi Bi Shahr Banu
- Qadamgah-e Emam Reza (disambiguation)
- Qadamgah-e Hazrat-e Ali
