= Shahru =

Shahru or Shahroo or Shahrow (Persian: شاهرو) may refer to:

- Shahru, Hormozgan

- Shahru, alternate name of Demshar-e Khurgu
- Shahru, alternate name of Sarkhun, Hormozgan
- Shahru, alternate name of Shahrow, Isin
- Shahru, alternate name of Shahrow, Tazian

- Shahru, Lorestan
