= Iran and weapons of mass destruction =

Iran is not known to currently possess weapons of mass destruction and has signed treaties repudiating the development and possession of WMD including the Non-Proliferation Treaty, Biological Weapons Convention, Chemical Weapons Convention, and Comprehensive Nuclear-Test-Ban Treaty. The nuclear program of Iran has been one of the most scrutinized in the world; Iran asserts it is purely civilian, while the IAEA Board of Governors has found Iran in non-compliance with its International Atomic Energy Agency (IAEA) obligations. Iran has called for nuclear-weapon states to disarm and the establishment of a Middle East Weapons of Mass Destruction Free Zone. Over 100,000 Iranian troops and civilians were victims of Iraqi chemical attacks during the 1980s Iran–Iraq War.

Development of nuclear technology began in the Pahlavi era and continued after the 1979 Iranian Revolution. The United States Intelligence Community assessed in 2007 that Iran pursued nuclear weapons under the AMAD Project between the late 1980s until 2003, then ceasing its effort. In 2005, the IAEA Board of Governors found Iran in non-compliance with its NPT safeguards agreement and in 2006 the United Nations Security Council (UNSC) demanded Iran cease uranium enrichment and imposed sanctions. Throughout the early 2010s, US, EU, and Russian officials said Iran was pursuing nuclear latency, but not weapons possession. The US and Israel sought to covertly degrade the Iranian nuclear program, with the 1990s US Operation Merlin, the 2009 use of the jointly-developed Stuxnet computer worm, and Israeli assassinations of Iranian nuclear scientists since 2010, part of the Iran–Israel proxy conflict.

In 2015, the Joint Comprehensive Plan of Action was signed by Iran with the P5+1, China, France, Russia, the UK, the US, plus Germany: Iran agreed to extensive monitoring and restriction of activities at nuclear facilities in Iran including Arak, Fordow, Isfahan, Natanz, in exchange for sanctions relief. In 2018, US president Donald Trump unilaterally withdrew from the plan, imposing a maximum pressure campaign of sanctions, and Iran began stockpiling enriched uranium (Note: According to CNN, as of 2025 Iran has stockpiled 7730 kg of low enriched uranium, 275 kg of nearly 20% low enriched uranium, and 409 kg of 60% highly enriched uranium. Uranium is considered weapons-grade at 90% enrichment.) and largely suspended IAEA monitoring.

On 12 June 2025, the IAEA found (Note: The resolution was passed with 19 votes in favour, 3 against (Russia, China and Burkina Faso) and 11 abstentions.) Iran non-compliant with its NPT safeguards agreement for the first time since 2005. On 13 June, Israel launched airstrikes targeting Iranian military leaders, nuclear scientists, and nuclear facilities, beginning the twelve-day Iran–Israel war. On 22 June, the United States bombed Iranian nuclear sites with larger bunker-buster bombs. Iran subsequently suspended operation with the IAEA. In August, France, Germany, and the UK triggered the snapback mechanism, which reinstated UN sanctions in September. On 18 October, Iran, Russia, and China declared the JCPOA terminated and the UN sanctions legally void. In February 2026, Israel and the United States launched a war against Iran, with the supposed pursuit of "weapons of mass destruction" under the Iranian nuclear and missile programs as one justification.

The Islamic Revolutionary Guard Corps Aerospace Force's acquisition of missile technologies, especially ballistic missiles, has also led to sanctions. In 2010, UNSC Resolution 1929 prohibited Iran from ballistic missile technology, although it is disputed if the 2015 UNSC Resolution 2231 overturned this. Iran supplies missiles to its allies, particularly the Houthis and Hezbollah.

== Nuclear weapons ==
Islamic Republic of Iran
- Nuclear program start date: 1957
- First nuclear weapon test: None
- First thermonuclear weapon test: None
- Last nuclear test: None
- Largest yield test: None
- Total tests: None
- Peak stockpile: Unknown
- Current stockpile: Unknown
- Deployed warheads: Unknown
- Total deployed warhead megatonnage: Unknown
- Maximum missile range: Unknown
- NPT party: Yes

=== Overview ===
In September 2005, the IAEA Board of Governors, in a rare non-consensus decision with 12 abstentions, recalled a previous Iranian "policy of concealment" regarding its enrichment program and found that Iran had violated its NPT Safeguards Agreement. Another IAEA report stated "there is no evidence that the previously undeclared nuclear material and activities ... were related to a nuclear weapons program." Iran has said that the military threat posed by Israel and the United States is forcing it to restrict the release of information on its nuclear program. Gawdat Bahgat of the National Defense University speculates that Iran may have a lack of confidence in the international community which was reinforced when many nations, under pressure from the United States, rejected or withdrew from signed commercial deals with the Iranian nuclear authority.

On 31 July 2006, the UN Security Council passed a resolution demanding Iran suspend its enrichment program. On 23 December 2006, the Security Council imposed sanctions against Iran, which were tightened on 24 March 2007, because Iran refused to suspend enrichment. Iran's representative to the UN argued that the sanctions compelled Iran to abandon its rights under the NPT to peaceful nuclear technology. The Non-Aligned Movement called on both sides to work through the IAEA for a solution.

US intelligence predicted in August 2005 that Iran could have the key ingredients for a nuclear weapon by 2015. On 25 October 2007, the United States declared the Revolutionary Guards a "proliferator of weapons of mass destruction", and the Quds Force a "supporter of terrorism". Iran responded that "it is incongruent for a country [US] who itself is a producer of weapons of mass destruction to take such a decision." Mohamed ElBaradei, Director General of the IAEA at the time, said he had no evidence Iran was building nuclear weapons and accused US leaders of adding "fuel to the fire" with their rhetoric. Speaking in Washington in November 2007, days before the IAEA was to publish its latest report, Israeli deputy prime minister Shaul Mofaz called for ElBaradei to be sacked, saying: "The policies followed by ElBaradei endanger world peace. His irresponsible attitude of sticking his head in the sand over Iran's nuclear programme should lead to his impeachment." Israel and some western governments fear Iran is using its nuclear programme as a covert means to develop weapons, while Iran says it is aimed solely at producing electricity. For its part in the conflict-ridden Middle East, Israel is a member of the IAEA, but it is not itself a signatory to the Nuclear Non-Proliferation Treaty, and is widely believed to currently be the only nuclear-armed state in the region.

=== History ===
Iran's nuclear program began as a result of the Cold War alliance between the United States and the Shah of Iran, Mohammad Reza Pahlavi, who emerged as an important US ally in the Persian Gulf. Under the Atoms for Peace program, Iran received basic nuclear research facilities from the United States. In return, Tehran signed the Treaty on the Non-Proliferation of Nuclear Weapons (NPT) in 1968. Fueled by high oil prices in the 1970s, Iran sought to purchase large-scale nuclear facilities from Western suppliers in order to develop nuclear power and fuel-cycle facilities with both civilian and potential military applications. In March 1974, the shah established the Atomic Energy Organization of Iran (AEOI). Sensing a heightened risk of nuclear proliferation, the United States convinced Western allies to limit the export of nuclear fuel-cycle facilities to Iran. Supreme Leader Ayatollah Ruhollah Khomeini, whose revolution displaced the Shah's monarchy in 1979 and ruled the newly established Islamic Republic of Iran until his death in 1989, placed little emphasis on nuclear weapons development because it was viewed as a suspicious Western innovation. During that time, many of Iran's top scientists fled the country while the United States organized an international campaign to block any nuclear assistance to Iran.

Following the death of Ayotollah Khomeini, the leadership of President Ali Akbar Hashemi Rafsanjani and Supreme Leader Ali Hosseini Khamenei sought to revive Iran's overt nuclear civilian program and expand undeclared nuclear activities during the 1990s. According to a strategic dossier from International Institute for Strategic Studies, Iran turned away from Western suppliers and obtained nuclear assistance from Russia and China in a number of key areas, including uranium mining, milling and conversion, as well as technology for heavy-water research reactors. However, Washington intervened with Moscow and Beijing to prevent Iran from fully acquiring its list of nuclear power and fuel-cycle facilities. The 1990s also saw Iran expand its furtive nuclear research into conversion, enrichment and plutonium separation. "Most importantly, on the basis of additional centrifuge assistance from the A.Q. Khan network, Iran was able to begin the construction of pilot-scale and industrial-scale enrichment facilities at Natanz around 2000." Full exposure of Iran's nuclear activities came in 2002, when an Iranian exiled opposition group, the National Council of Resistance of Iran (NCRI) declared the Natanz project in August of that year. Since that time, international pressure on Iran has remained steady, hampering but not halting the country's nuclear development. Iran remains legally bound to the NPT and states its support for the treaty.

On 28 August 2025, E3 members, France, Germany, and the United Kingdom, initiated the process of the snapback mechanism, with the prospect of freezing Iranian overseas assets, blocking arms deals with Iran, imposing penal action against development of Iran's ballistic missile program and further restricting Iran's military and nuclear activities. In a letter addressed to the president of the UN Security Council, the foreign ministers of the E3 stated that since 2019, Iran had "increasingly and deliberately ceased performing its JCPOA commitments", including "the accumulation of a highly enriched uranium stockpile which lacks any credible civiliian justification and is unprecedented for a state without a nuclear weapons program". The letter detailed additional Iranian violations of the agreement despite the fact that the E3 "have consistently upheld their agreements under the terms of the JCPOA". The activation opened a 30-day window, intended ro reengage Iran, "whose refusal to cooperate with the International Atomic Energy Agency's (IAEA) inspectors started the crisis", in diplomatic negotiations before full restoration of sanctions. According to Euronews, Iran's Foreign Minister Abbas Araghchi declared that it was "unjustified, illegal, and lacking any legal basis" and promised that "The Islamic Republic of Iran will respond appropriately".

There are various estimates of when Iran might be able to produce a nuclear weapon, should it choose to do so:

- A 2005 assessment by the International Institute for Strategic Studies concluded "if Iran threw caution to the wind, and sought a nuclear weapon capability as quickly as possible without regard for international reaction, it might be able to produce enough HEU for a single nuclear weapon by the end of this decade", assuming no technical problems. The report concludes, however, that it is unlikely that Iran would flatly ignore international reactions and develop nuclear weapons anyway.
- A 2005 US National Intelligence Estimate stated that Iran was ten years from making a nuclear weapon.
- In 2006 Ernst Uhrlau, the head of German intelligence service, said Tehran would not be able to produce enough material for a nuclear bomb before 2010 and would only be able to make it into a weapon by about 2015.
- A 2007 annual review the International Institute for Strategic Studies in London stated that "If and when Iran does have 3,000 centrifuges operating smoothly, the IISS estimates it would take an additional 9-11 months to produce 25 kg of highly enriched uranium, enough for one implosion-type weapon. That day is still 2–3 years away at the earliest."
- The former head of the IAEA, Mohamed ElBaradei, said on 24 May 2007 that Iran could take between 3 and 8 years to make a bomb if it went down that route.
- On 22 October 2007, Mohamed ElBaradei repeated that, even assuming Iran was trying to develop a nuclear bomb, they would require "between another three and eight years to succeed", an assessment shared by "all the intelligence services".
- In December 2007, the United States National Intelligence Estimate (representing the consensus view of all 16 American intelligence agencies) concluded with a "high level of confidence" that Iran had halted its nuclear weapons program in 2003 and "with moderate confidence" that the program remained frozen as of mid-2007. The new estimate says that the enrichment program could still provide Iran with enough raw material to produce a nuclear weapon sometime by the middle of next decade, but that intelligence agencies "do not know whether it currently intends to develop nuclear weapons" at some future date. Iranian Foreign Minister Manouchehr Mottaki said 70 percent of the U.S. report was "true and positive," but denied its allegations of Iran having had a nuclear weapons program before 2003. Russia has said there was no proof Iran has ever run a nuclear weapons program. The former head of the IAEA, Mohamed ElBaradei, stated that he had seen "maybe some studies about possible weaponization", but "no evidence" of "an active weaponization program" as of October 2007. Thomas Fingar, former chairman of the National Intelligence Council until December 2008, in reference to the 2007 Iran NIE and using intelligence to anticipate opportunities and shape the future, said intelligence has a "recently reinforced propensity to underscore, overstate, or 'hype' the findings in order to get people to pay attention" and that the 2007 NIE was intended to send the message "you do not have a lot of time but you appear to have a diplomatic or non-military option". A National Intelligence Estimate (NIE) is the most authoritative written judgment concerning a national security issue prepared by the Director of Central Intelligence.
- The U.S. Director of National Intelligence said in February 2009 that Iran would not realistically be able to a get a nuclear weapon until 2013, if it chose to develop one., and that US intelligence does not know whether Iran intends to develop nuclear weapons, but believes Iran could at least be keeping the option to develop them open. Mossad Chief Meir Dagan was more cautious, saying recently that it would take the Iranians until 2014. German, French, and British intelligence said that under a worst-case scenario it would take Iran a minimum of 18 months to develop a nuclear weapon if it chose to build one, and it would have to first purify its uranium and weaponize its uranium. An anonymous source in the German Foreign Intelligence Service (BND) whose rank was not provided has gone further and claimed Iran could produce a nuclear bomb and conduct an underground test in 6 months if it wanted to and further asserted that Iran had already mastered the full uranium enrichment cycle, and possessed enough centrifuges to produce weapons-grade uranium. Physicists said that if Iran were to choose to develop a nuclear weapon, it would have to withdraw from the International Nuclear Non-Proliferation Treaty and expel International Atomic Energy Agency inspectors from the country. George Friedman, head of the global intelligence company Stratfor, has said Iran is "decades away" from developing any credible nuclear-arms capacity.
- On 12 February 2010 US think tank expert David Albright, the head of the Institute for Science and International Security, said in a report that Iran was seeking to "make sufficient weapons-grade uranium".
- An IAEA report issued 8 November 2011 provided detailed information outlining the IAEA's concerns about the possible military dimensions of Iran's nuclear program, noting that Iran had pursued a structured program or activities relevant to the development of nuclear weapons.
- On 30 April 2018, Israeli prime minister Binyamin Netanyahu revealed thousands of files he said were copied from a "highly secret location" in Teheran which show an Iranian effort to develop nuclear weapons between 1999 and 2003.
- On 1 May 2018 the IAEA reiterated its 2015 report, saying it had found no credible evidence of nuclear weapons activity in Iran after 2009.
- In 2021, a group of former Republican officials including ex-CIA director James Woolsey, wrote in the National Review that "Iran probably has already the atomic bomb," citing past detection failures by U.S. intelligence and the IAEA.
- On 2 March 2026, IAEA Director General Rafael Grossi reported that while Iran maintained a significant stockpile of near-weapons-grade uranium, there was no evidence of a structured program to build a nuclear bomb.

=== IAEA ===
The International Atomic Energy Agency (IAEA) is an autonomous international organization that seeks to promote the peaceful use of nuclear energy and to inhibit its use for military purposes.

On 6 March 2006, the IAEA Secretariat reported that "the Agency has not seen indications of diversion of nuclear material to nuclear weapons or other nuclear explosive devices ... however, after three years of intensive verification, there remain uncertainties with regard to both the scope and the nature of Iran's nuclear programme". However, the inspectors did find some sensitive documents, including instructions and diagrams on how to make uranium into a sphere, which is only necessary to make nuclear weapons. Iran furnished the IAEA with copies, claiming not to have used the information for weapons work, which it had obtained along with other technology and parts in 1987 and the mid-1990s. It is thought this material was sold to them by Abdul Qadeer Khan, though the documents did not have the necessary technical details to actually manufacture a bomb.

On 18 December 2003, Iran voluntarily signed, but did not ratify or bring into force, an Additional Protocol that allows IAEA inspectors access to individuals, documentation relating to procurement, dual-use equipment, certain military-owned workshops, and research and development locations. Iran agreed voluntarily to implement the Additional Protocol provisionally, however when the IAEA reported Iran's non-compliance to the United Nations Security Council on 4 February 2006 Iran withdrew from its voluntary adherence to the Additional Protocol.

On 12 May 2006, claims that highly enriched uranium (well over the 3.5% enriched level) was reported to have been found "at a site where Iran has denied such sensitive atomic work", appeared. "They have found particles of highly enriched uranium [HEU], but it is not clear if this is contamination from centrifuges that had been previously found [from imported material] or something new," said one diplomat close to the UN International Atomic Energy Agency (IAEA). These reports have not yet been officially confirmed by the IAEA (as of 1 June 2006).

On 31 July 2006, the United Nations Security Council passed a resolution demanding that Iran suspend its uranium enrichment activities.

In late 2006, "New traces of plutonium and enriched uranium– potential material for atomic warheads– have been found [by the IAEA] in a nuclear waste facility in Iran." However, "A senior U.N. official who was familiar with the report cautioned against reading too much into the findings of traces of highly enriched uranium and plutonium, saying Iran had explained both and they could plausibly be classified as byproducts of peaceful nuclear activities." In 2007 these traces were determined to have come from leaking used highly enriched uranium fuel from the Tehran Research Reactor, which the U.S. supplied to Iran in 1967, and the matter was closed.

In July 2007 the IAEA announced that Iran has agreed to allow inspectors to visit its Arak nuclear plant, and by August 2007 a plan for monitoring the Natanz uranium enrichment plant will have been finalised.

In August 2007 the IAEA announced that Iran has agreed to a plan to resolve key questions regarding its past nuclear activities. The IAEA described this as a "significant step forward".

In September 2007 the IAEA announced it has been able to verify that Iran's declared nuclear material has not been diverted from peaceful use. While the IAEA has been unable to verify some "important aspects" regarding the nature and scope of Iran's nuclear work, the agency and Iranian officials agreed on a plan to resolve all outstanding issues, Director-General Mohamed ElBaradei said at the time. In an interview with Radio Audizioni Italiane the same month, ElBaradei remarked that "Iran does not constitute a certain and immediate threat for the international community". In October 2007, ElBaradei amplified these remarks, telling Le Monde that, even if Iran did intend to develop a nuclear bomb, they would need "between another three and eight years to succeed". He went on to note that "all the intelligence services" agree with this assessment and that he wanted to "get people away from the idea that Iran will be a threat from tomorrow, and that we are faced right now with the issue of whether Iran should be bombed or allowed to have the bomb".

In late October 2007, according to the International Herald Tribune, the former head of the IAEA, Mohamed ElBaradei, stated that he had seen "no evidence" of Iran developing nuclear weapons. The IHT quoted ElBaredei as stating that,

"We have information that there has been maybe some studies about possible weaponization," said Mohamed ElBaradei, who led the International Atomic Energy Agency. "That's why we have said that we cannot give Iran a pass right now, because there is still a lot of question marks."

"But have we seen Iran having the nuclear material that can readily be used into a weapon? No. Have we seen an active weaponization program? No."

The IHT report went on to say that "ElBaradei said he was worried about the growing rhetoric from the U.S., which he noted focused on Iran's alleged intentions to build a nuclear weapon rather than evidence the country was actively doing so. If there is actual evidence, ElBaradei said he would welcome seeing it."

In November 2007 ElBaradei circulated a report to the upcoming meeting of the IAEA Board of Governors. Its findings conclude that Iran has made important strides towards clarifying its past activities, including provided access to documentation and officials involved in centrifuge design in the 1980s and 1990s. Answers provided by Iran regarding the past P-1 and P-2 centrifuge programs were found to be consistent with the IAEA's own findings. However, Iran has ignored the demands of the UN Security council, and has continued to enrich uranium in the past year. The IAEA is not able to conclusively confirm that Iran isn't currently enriching uranium for military purposes, as its inspections have been restricted to workshops previously declared as part of the civilian uranium enrichment program, and requests for access to certain military workshops have been denied; the report noted that "As a result, the agency's knowledge about Iran's current nuclear program is diminishing". The report also confirmed that Iran now possesses 3000 centrifuges, a 10-fold increase over the past year, though the feed rate is below the maximum for a facility of this design. Data regarding the P-2 centrifuge, which Ahmadinejad has claimed will quadruple production of enriched uranium, was provided only several days before the report was published; the IAEA plan to discuss this issue further in December. In response to the report the US has vowed to push for more sanctions, whilst Iran has called for an apology from the US.

In his final November 2009 statement to the IAEA Board of Governors, Mohamed ElBaradei said the agency continued to verify the non-diversion of declared nuclear material in Iran, but that other issues of concern had reached a "dead end" unless Iran were to fully cooperate with the agency. ElBaradei stated it would be helpful if "we were able to share with Iran more of the material that is at the centre of these concerns", and also said it would be helpful if Iran fully implemented the Subsidiary Arrangements to its Safeguards Agreement and fully implemented the Additional Protocol. ElBaradei said Iran's failure to report the existence of a new fuel enrichment facility until September 2009 was inconsistent with its obligations under the Subsidiary Arrangements to its Safeguards Agreement. ElBaradei closed by saying international negotiations represented a "unique opportunity to address a humanitarian need and create space for negotiations".

On 18 February 2010 the IAEA released a new report on Iran's nuclear program. Ivan Oelrich and Ivanka Barzashka, writing in the Bulletin of the Atomic Scientists, suggested "the media has seriously misrepresented the actual contents of the report" and that "in fact, no new information has been revealed." They wrote that there was "no independent assessment that Iran is engaged in weapons work" and that this was "hardly the first time that the agency has discussed potential evidence of Tehran's nuclear weapons research". Iran's envoy to the UN atomic watchdog criticized Western powers for interpreting the IAEA report in an "exaggerated, selective and inaccurate" manner.

In an April 2010 interview with the BBC, former IAEA Director General ElBaradei said Western nations were seeking harsher sanctions "out of frustration". "I don't think Iran is developing, or we have new information that Iran is developing, a nuclear weapon today .. there is a concern about Iran's future intentions, but even if you talk to MI6 or the CIA, they will tell you they are still four or five years away from a weapon. So, we have time to engage," he said. ElBaradei further said the building of trust between the parties would "not happen until the two sides sit around the negotiating table and address their grievances. Sooner or later that will happen."

In February 2019, the IAEA certified that Iran was still abiding by the international Joint Comprehensive Plan of Action (JCPOA) of 2015. However, on 8 May 2019, one year after U.S. withdrawal from JCPOA, Iran announced it would suspend implementation of some parts of the JCPOA, threatening further action in 60 days unless it received protection from US sanctions. In July 2019, the IAEA confirmed that Iran had breached both the 300 kg enriched uranium stockpile limit and the 3.67% refinement limit. On 5 November 2019, Iranian nuclear chief Ali Akbar Salehi announced that Iran would enrich uranium to 5% at the Fordow Fuel Enrichment Plant, adding that the country had the capability to enrich uranium to 20% if needed. Also in November, Behrouz Kamalvandi, spokesman for the Atomic Energy Organization of Iran, stated that Iran can enrich up to 60% if needed. President Hassan Rouhani declared that Iran's nuclear program would be "limitless" while the country launches the third phase of quitting from the 2015 nuclear deal.

In March 2020, the IAEA said that Iran had nearly tripled its stockpile of enriched uranium since early November 2019. In September 2020, the IAEA reported that Iran had accumulated ten times as much enriched uranium as permitted by the JCPOA.

Throughout 2021 and 2022, Iran installed cascades of advanced centrifuges (IR-2m, IR-4, IR-6) at Natanz and Fordow, significantly increasing its enrichment output. In February 2021, the IAEA reported that Iran stopped allowing access to data from nuclear sites, as well as plans for future sites. In April 2021, a sabotage attack struck the Natanz enrichment plant, causing an electrical blackout and damaging centrifuges. Iran responded by further increasing enrichment: days later, it began producing 60% enriched uranium, an unprecedented level for Iran, just short of weapons-grade (90% and above). This 60% enrichment took place at Natanz, and later at Fordow as well, yielding a stockpile that as of early 2023 exceeded ~70 kg of 60% uranium. If Iran chose to enrich this material to 90%, it would be sufficient for several nuclear warheads. The UK, France, and Germany said that Iran has "no credible civilian use for uranium metal" and called the news "deeply concerning" because of its "potentially grave military implications". On 25 June 2022, in a meeting with the senior diplomat of the EU, Ali Shamkhani, Iran's top security officer, declared that Iran would continue to advance its nuclear program until the West modifies its "illegal behavior".

In July 2022, according to an IAEA report referred to by Reuters, Iran had increased its uranium enrichment through the use of sophisticated equipment at its underground Fordow plant in a configuration that can more quickly vary between enrichment levels. In September 2022, Germany, United Kingdom and France expressed doubts over Iran's sincerity in returning to the JCPOA after Tehran insisted that the IAEA close its probes into uranium traces at three undeclared Iranian sites. The IAEA said it could not guarantee the peaceful nature of Iran's nuclear program, stating there had been "no progress in resolving questions about the past presence of nuclear material at undeclared sites". United Nations Secretary-General António Guterres urged Iran to hold "serious dialogue" about nuclear inspections and said IAEA's independence is "essential" in response to Iranian demands to end probes. In February 2023, the IAEA reported having found uranium in Iran enriched to 84%. The Iranian government has claimed that this is an "unintended fluctuation" in the enrichment levels, though the Iranians have been openly enriching uranium to 60% purity, a breach of the 2015 nuclear deal. In 2024, Iranian President Masoud Pezeshkian expressed interest in reopening discussions with the United States on the nuclear deal.

In November 2024, Iran announced that it would make new advanced centrifuges after IAEA condemned Iranians' non-compliance and secrecy.

On 31 May 2025, IAEA reported that Iran had sharply increased its stockpile of uranium enriched to 60% purity, just below weapons-grade, reaching over 408 kilograms, a nearly 50% rise since February. The agency warned that this amount is enough for multiple nuclear weapons if further enriched. It also noted that Iran remains the only non-nuclear-weapon state to produce such material, calling the situation a "serious concern". The IAEA reported that Iran was not meeting its obligations per its 2019 agreement by hiding its development of nuclear material, and the IAEA voted to censure Iran on June 12. That same month, the NCRI said Iran is pursuing nuclear weapons through a new program called the "Kavir Plan". According to the NCRI, the new project involves six sites in Semnan province working on warheads and related technology, succeeding the previous AMAD Project.

In February 2026, Iran informed the IAEA that normal safeguards were "legally untenable and materially impracticable," as a result of threats and "acts of aggression," leaving the IAEA unable to verify whether Iran had suspended enrichment or confirm the status of its current stockpile, though it found no evidence Iran was weaponizing.

==== Alleged weaponization studies ====
Former IAEA Director General ElBaradei said in 2009 that the agency had been provided with "no credible evidence" that Iran is developing nuclear weapons, but the New York Times reported in January 2009 that the IAEA is investigating U.S. allegations Project 110 and Project 111 could be names for Iranian efforts for designing a nuclear warhead and making it work with an Iranian missile. "We are looking to those suppliers of information to help us on the question of authenticity, because that is really a major issue. It is not an issue that involves nuclear material; it's a question of allegations," ElBaradei further said. ElBaradei has strongly denied reports that the agency had concluded Iran had developed technology needed to assemble a nuclear warhead, when a November 2009 article in The Guardian said the allegations included Iran's weapon design activities using two-point implosion designs.

The New York Times article cited classified US intelligence reports asserting that Professor Mohsen Fakhrizadeh is in charge of the projects, while Iranian officials assert these projects are a fiction made up by the United States. The article further reported that "while the international agency readily concedes that the evidence about the two projects remains murky, one of the documents it briefly displayed at a meeting of the agency's member countries in Vienna last year, from Mr. Fakrizadeh's projects, showed the chronology of a missile launching, ending with a warhead exploding about 650 yards above ground – approximately the altitude from which the bomb dropped on Hiroshima was detonated." Gordon Oehler, who ran the CIA's nonproliferation center and served as deputy director of the presidential commission on weapons of mass destruction, wrote "if someone has a good idea for a missile program, and he has really good connections, he'll get that program through.. But that doesn't mean there is a master plan for a nuclear weapon." Outside experts note that the parts of the report made public lack many dates associated with Iran's alleged activities meaning it is possible Iran had a Project 110 at one time, but scrapped it as US intelligence insists. The Washington Post reported that "nowhere are there construction orders, payment invoices, or more than a handful of names and locations possibly connected to the projects." Former IAEA Director General ElBaradei said the agency didn't have any information that nuclear material has been used and didn't have any information that any components of nuclear weapons had been manufactured. Iran has asserted that the documents are a fabrication, while the IAEA has urged Iran to be more cooperative and Member States to provide more information about the allegations to be shared with Iran.

In August 2009 an article in the Israeli newspaper Haaretz alleged that ElBaradei had "censored" evidence obtained by IAEA inspectors over the preceding few months. ElBaradei has angrily rejected claims from Israel, France and the US that he had suppressed the internal IAEA report, saying all relevant and confirmed information had been presented to member states. ElBaradei said he and the agency have repeatedly said the rumors of censorship were "totally baseless, totally groundless. All information that we have received that has been vetted, assessed in accordance with our standard practices, has been shared with the Board."

On 16 November 2009 the Director General provided a report to the Board of Governors. The report stated "there remain a number of outstanding issues which give rise to concerns, and which need to be clarified to exclude the existence of possible military dimensions to Iran's nuclear programme." "The Agency is still awaiting a reply from Iran to its request to meet relevant Iranian authorities in connection with these issues", the report said. The report further said, "it would be helpful if Member States which have provided documentation to the agency would agree to share more of that documentation with Iran, as appropriate."

Russia has denied allegations of "continued Russian assistance to Iran's nuclear weapons program" as "totally groundless" and said the November 2009 IAEA report reaffirmed the absence of a military component in Iran's efforts in the nuclear field.

In December 2009, The Times claimed that a document from an unnamed Asian intelligence agency described the use of a neutron source which has no use other than in a nuclear weapon, and claimed the document appeared to be from an office in Iran's Defense Ministry and may have been from around 2007. Norman Dombey, professor emeritus of theoretical physics at Sussex University, wrote in that "nothing in the published 'intelligence documents' shows Iran is close to having nuclear weapons" and argued that it is "unlikely that nuclear weapon projects would be distributed among several universities, or weapon parts marketed to research centres." A senior U.N. official who saw the document said it may or may not be authentic, that it was unclear when the document was written, and that it was unclear whether any experiments had ever actually been performed. The C.I.A. did not declare whether it believes the document was real, and European spy agencies also did not give any authentication to the document. Western intelligence agencies said that, if genuine, it was unclear whether the paper provided any new insights into the state of Iranian weapons research. "It's very troubling – if real," said Thomas B. Cochran, a senior scientist in the nuclear program of the Natural Resources Defense Council. The Institute for Science and International Security, said that it "urges caution and further assessment" of the document and noted that "the document does not mention nuclear weapons .. and we have seen no evidence of an Iranian decision to build them." Anton Khlopkov, the founding director of the Center for Energy and Security Studies, said the media leak may be being used "as a pretext for inciting the campaign against Iran." Former Russian prime minister Yevgeny Primakov has also said after the public publications of the documents "Russia has no concrete information that Iran is planning to construct a weapon". Russia's representative to the IAEA, Alexander Zmeyevskiy, has noted that though the IAEA is in possession of these documents, the IAEA's findings "do not contain any conclusions about the presence of undeclared nuclear activities in Iran." Iran pointed out the claims had not been verified by the International Atomic Energy Agency and argued that "some countries are angry that our people defend their nuclear rights." "I think that some of the claims about our nuclear issue have turned into a repetitive and tasteless joke," Iranian president Mahmoud Ahmadinejad said in response to the documents.

In early July 2025, Iran suspended co-operation with the IAEA. The last IAEA inspectors left Iran by 4 July.

=== Iranian stance ===
Iran states that the purpose of its nuclear program is the generation of power and that any other use would be a violation of the Nuclear Non-Proliferation Treaty, of which it is a signatory, as well as being against Islamic religious principles. Iran claims that nuclear power is necessary for a booming population and rapidly industrialising nation. It points to the fact that Iran's population has more than doubled in 20 years, the country regularly imports gasoline and electricity, and that burning fossil fuel in large amounts harms Iran's environment drastically. Additionally, Iran questions why it shouldn't be allowed to diversify its sources of energy, especially when there are fears of its oil fields eventually being depleted. It continues to argue that its valuable oil should be used for high value products and export, not simple electricity generation. Furthermore, Iran argues that nuclear power makes fairly good economic sense. Building reactors is expensive, but subsequent operating costs are low and stable, and increasingly competitive as fossil-fuel prices rise. Iran also raises funding questions, claiming that developing the excess capacity in its oil industry would cost it $40 billion, not to speak of paying for the power plants. Harnessing nuclear power costs a fraction of this, considering Iran has abundant supplies of accessible uranium ore. These claims have been echoed by Scott Ritter, the former UN weapons inspector in Iraq. Roger Stern, of Johns Hopkins Department of Geography and Environmental Engineering, agrees "Iran's claims to need nuclear power could be genuine".

Iran states it has a legal right to enrich uranium for peaceful purposes under the NPT, and further says that it "has constantly complied with its obligations under the NPT and the Statute of the International Atomic Energy Agency". Twelve other countries are known to operate uranium enrichment facilities. Iran states that "the failure of certain Nuclear- Weapon States to fulfill their international obligations continue to be a source of threat for the international community". Iran also states that "the only country that has ever used nuclear weapons still maintains a sizable arsenal of thousands of nuclear warheads" and calls for a stop to the transfer of technology to non-NPT states. Iran has called for the development of a follow-up committee to ensure compliance with global nuclear disarmament. Iran and many other nations without nuclear weapons have said that the present situation whereby Nuclear Weapon States monopolise the right to possess nuclear weapons is "highly discriminatory", and they have pushed for steps to accelerate the process of nuclear disarmament.

Iran has criticized the European Union because it believes it has taken no steps to reduce the danger of nuclear weapons in the Middle East. Iran has called on the state of Israel to sign the NPT, accept inspection of its nuclear facilities, and place its nuclear facilities under IAEA safeguards. Iran has proposed that the Middle East be established as a proposed Nuclear Weapon Free Zone.

On 3 December 2004, Iran's former president and an Islamic cleric, Akbar Hashemi Rafsanjani alluded to Iran's position on nuclear energy:

God willing, we expect to soon join the club of the countries that have a nuclear industry, with all its branches, except the military one, in which we are not interested. We want to get what we're entitled to. I say unequivocally that for no price will we be willing to relinquish our legal and international right. I also say unequivocally to those who make false claims: Iran is not pursuing nuclear weapons, but it will not give up its rights. Your provocation will not make us pursue nuclear weapons. We hope that you come to your senses soon and do not get the world involved in disputes and crises.

On 14 November 2004, Iran's chief nuclear negotiator said that his country agreed to voluntarily and temporarily suspend the uranium enrichment program after pressure from the European Union on behalf of the United Kingdom, France and Germany, as a confidence-building measure for a reasonable period of time, with six months mentioned as a reference.

Iranian president Mahmoud Ahmadinejad has publicly stated Iran is not developing nuclear weapons. On 9 August 2005 Iran's Supreme Leader, Ayatollah Ali Khamenei, issued a fatwa that the production, stockpiling and use of nuclear weapons are forbidden under Islam and that Iran shall never acquire these weapons. The text of the fatwa has not been released although it was referenced in an official statement at a meeting of the International Atomic Energy Agency (IAEA) in Vienna.

Iranian President Mahmoud Ahmadinejad in a 2005 speech to the U.N. General Assembly said "We are concerned that once certain powerful states completely control nuclear energy resources and technology, they will deny access to other states and thus deepen the divide between powerful countries and the rest of the international community ... peaceful use of nuclear energy without possession of a nuclear fuel cycle is an empty proposition".

On 6 August 2005, Iran rejected a 34-page European Union proposal intended to help Iran build "a safe, economically viable and proliferation-proof civil nuclear power generation and research program." The Europeans, with US agreement, intended to entice Iran into a binding commitment not to develop uranium enrichment capability by offering to provide fuel and other long-term support that would facilitate electricity generation with nuclear energy. Iranian Foreign Ministry spokesman Hamid Reza Asefi rejected the proposal saying, "We had already announced that any plan has to recognize Iran's right to enrich uranium". After the Iranian Revolution, Germany halted construction of the Bushehr reactor, the United States cut off supply of highly enriched uranium (HEU) fuel for the Tehran Research Reactor, and Iran never received uranium from France which it asserted it was entitled to. Russia agreed not to provide an enrichment plant and terminated cooperation on several other nuclear-related technologies, including laser isotope separation; China terminated several nuclear projects (in return, in part for entry into force of a U.S.-China civil nuclear cooperation agreement); and Ukraine agreed not to provide the turbine for Bushehr. Iran argues that these experiences contribute to a perception that foreign nuclear supplies are potentially subject to being interrupted.

Iran resumed its uranium enrichment program in January 2006, prompting the IAEA to refer the issue to the UN Security Council.

On 21 February 2006, Rooz, a news website run by Iranian exiles (the Fedayeen Khalq [People's Commandos] leftist terrorist group), reported that Hojatoleslam Mohsen Gharavian, a student of Qom's fundamentalist cleric Mesbah Yazdi, spoke about the necessity of using nuclear weapons as a means to retaliate and announced that "based on religious law, everything depends on our purpose". In an interview with the Islamic Republic News Agency the same day, Gharavian rejected these reports, saying "We do not seek nuclear weapons and the Islamic religion encourages coexistence along with peace and friendship...these websites have tried to misquote me."

On 11 April 2006, Iranian president Mahmoud Ahmadinejad announced Iranian scientists working at the pilot facility at Natanz had successfully enriched uranium to the 3.5 percent level, using a small cascade of 164 gas centrifuges. In the televised address from the city of Mashhad he said, "I am officially announcing that Iran has joined the group of those countries which have nuclear technology".

In May 2006 some members of the Iranian legislature ("Majlis" or Parliament) sent a letter to UN Secretary-General Kofi Annan threatening to withdraw from the NPT if Iran's right to peaceful use of nuclear technology under the treaty was not protected.

On 21 February 2007, the same day the UN deadline to suspend nuclear activities expired, Mahmoud Ahmadinejad made the following statement: "If they say that we should close down our fuel production facilities to resume talks, we say fine, but those who enter talks with us should also close down their nuclear fuel production activities". The White House's spokesperson Tony Snow rejected the offer and called it a "false offer".

Iran has said that U.N. Security Council sanctions aimed at curtailing its uranium-enrichment activities unfairly target its medical sector. "We have thousands of patients a month at our hospital alone .. If we can't help them, some will die. It's as simple as that," said an Iranian nuclear medicine specialist. An Iranian Jew from California claimed "I don't believe in these sanctions... They hurt normal people, not leaders. What is the use of that?" Vice President of the Atomic Energy Organization of Iran Ghannadi framed the debate as a humanitarian issue, "This is about human beings. . . . When someone is sick, we should give medicine." Iran informed the International Atomic Energy Agency (IAEA) that fuel obtained from Argentina in 1993 would run out by the end of 2010, and that it could produce the uranium itself or buy the uranium from abroad.

In February 2010, to refuel the Tehran Research Reactor which produces medical isotopes, Iran began using a single cascade to enrich uranium "up to 19.8%", to match the previously foreign supplied fuel. 20% is the upper threshold for low enriched uranium (LEU). Though HEU enriched to levels exceeding 20% is considered technically usable in a nuclear explosive device, this route is much less desirable because far more material is required to achieve a sustained nuclear chain reaction. HEU enriched to 90% and above is most typically used in a weapons development program.

In an interview in October 2011, President Ahmadinejad of Iran said:

"We have already expressed our views about nuclear bombs. We said those who are seeking to build nuclear bombs or those who stockpile, they are politically and mentally retarded. We think they are stupid because the era of nuclear bombs is over. [Why] for example, should Iran continue its efforts and tolerate all international treasures only to build a nuclear bomb, or a few nuclear bombs that are useless? They can never be used!"

On 22 February 2012, in a meeting in Tehran with the director and officials of the Atomic Energy Organization of Iran (AEOI) and nuclear scientists, Leader of the Islamic Revolution Ayatollah Seyyed Ali Khamenei said:

"The Iranian nation has never pursued and will never pursue nuclear weapons. There is no doubt that the decision makers in the countries opposing us know well that Iran is not after nuclear weapons because the Islamic Republic, logically, religiously and theoretically, considers the possession of nuclear weapons a grave sin and believes the proliferation of such weapons is senseless, destructive and dangerous."

=== U.S. stance ===
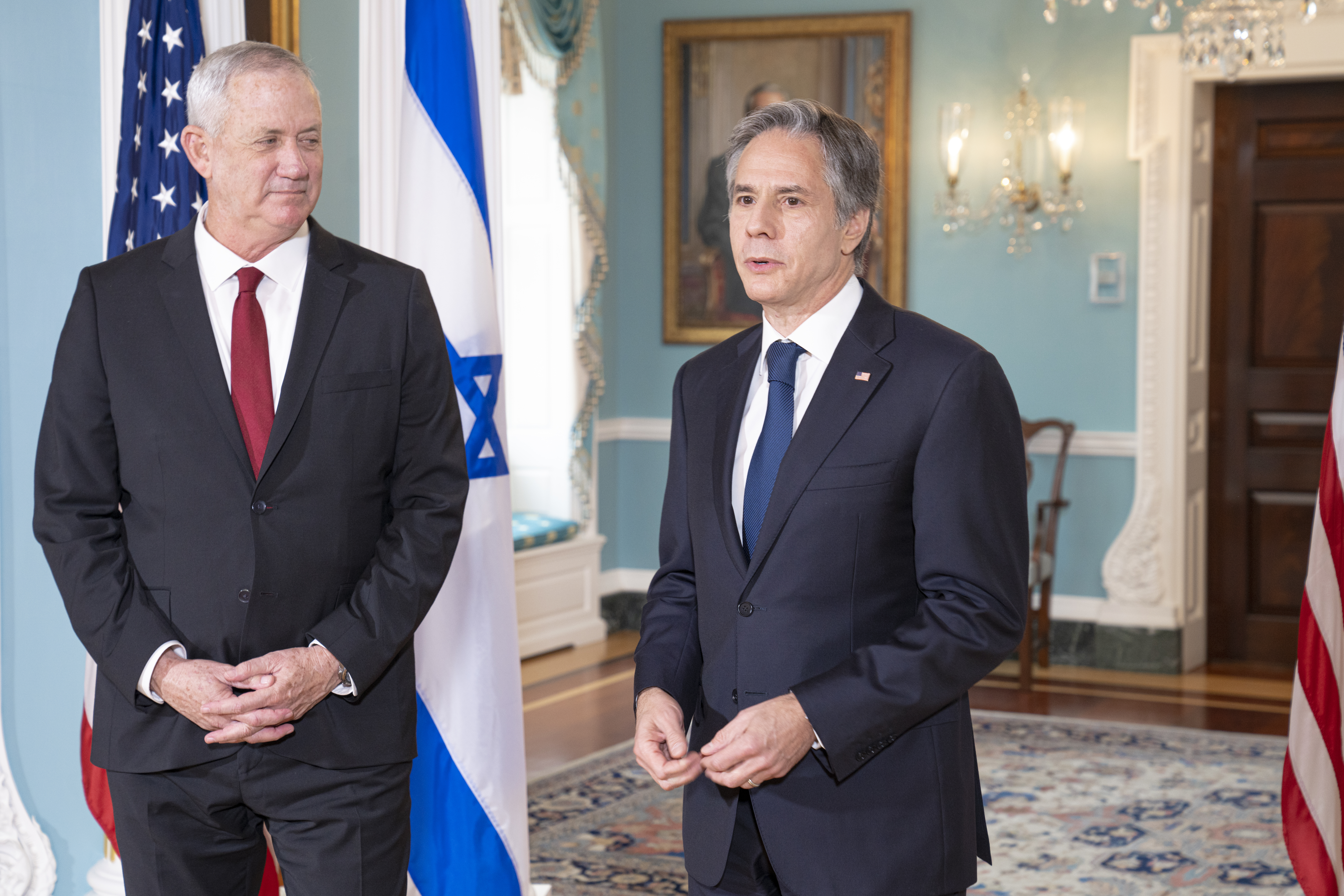
Joe Biden's Secretary of State Antony Blinken did not rule out a military intervention to stop Iran from obtaining nuclear weapons.

- In 2005, the United States stated that Iran has violated both Article III and Article II of the NPT. The IAEA Board of Governors, in a rare divided vote, found Iran in noncompliance with its NPT safeguards agreement for a 1985–2003 "policy of concealment" regarding its efforts to develop enrichment and reprocessing technologies. The United States, the IAEA and others consider these technologies to be of particular concern because they can be used to produce fissile material for use in nuclear weapons.
- The United States has argued that Iran's concealment of efforts to develop sensitive nuclear technology is prima facie evidence of Iran's intention to develop nuclear weapons, or at a minimum to develop a latent nuclear weapons capability. Others have noted that while possession of the technology "contributes to the latency of non-nuclear weapon states in their potential to acquire nuclear weapons" but that such latency is not necessarily evidence of intent to proceed toward the acquisition of nuclear weapons, since "intent is in the eye of the beholder".
- The United States has also provided information to the IAEA on Iranian studies related to weapons design, activities, including the intention of diverting a civilian nuclear energy program to the manufacture of weapons, based on a laptop computer reportedly linked to Iranian weapons programs. The United States has pointed to other information reported by the IAEA, including the Green Salt Project, the possession of a document on manufacturing uranium metal hemispheres, and other links between Iran's military and its nuclear program, as further indications of a military intent to Iran's nuclear program. The IAEA has said U.S. intelligence provided to it through 2007 has proven inaccurate or not led to significant discoveries inside Iran; however, the US, and others have recently provided more intelligence to the agency.
- In May 2003, The Swiss ambassador to Iran sent the State Department a two-page document, reportedly approved by Ayatollah Khamanei, outlining a road map towards normalization of relations between the two states. The Iranians offered full transparency of its nuclear programme and withdrawal of support from Hamas and Hezbollah in exchange for security assurances and normalization of diplomatic relations. The Bush Administration did not respond to the proposal, as senior U.S. officials doubted its authenticity.
- The United States acknowledges Iran's right to nuclear power, and has joined with the EU-3, Russia and China in offering nuclear and other economic and technological cooperation with Iran if it suspends uranium enrichment. This cooperation would include an assured supply of fuel for Iran's nuclear reactors.
- A potential reason behind U.S. resistance to an Iranian nuclear program lies in Middle Eastern geopolitics. In essence, the US feels that it must guard against even the possibility of Iran obtaining a nuclear weapons capability. Some nuclear technology is dual-use; i.e. it can be used for peaceful energy generation, and to develop nuclear weapons, a situation that resulted in India's nuclear weapons program in the 1960s. A nuclear-armed Iran would dramatically change the balance of power in the Middle East, weakening US influence. It could also encourage other Middle Eastern nations to develop nuclear weapons of their own further reducing US influence in a critical region.
- In 2003, the United States insisted that Tehran be "held accountable" for seeking to build nuclear arms in violation of its agreements. In June 2005, the US secretary of state Condoleezza Rice required former IAEA head Mohamed ElBaradei to either "toughen his stance on Iran" or fail to be chosen for a third term as IAEA head. The IAEA has on some occasions criticised the stance of the U.S. on Iran's program. The United States denounced Iran's successful enrichment of uranium to fuel grade in April 2006, with spokesman Scott McClellan saying, they "continue to show that Iran is moving in the wrong direction". In November 2006, Seymour Hersh described a classified draft assessment by the Central Intelligence Agency "challenging the White House's assumptions about how close Iran might be to building a nuclear bomb." He continued, "The CIA found no conclusive evidence, as yet, of a secret Iranian nuclear-weapons program running parallel to the civilian operations that Iran has declared to the International Atomic Energy Agency," adding that a current senior intelligence official confirmed the assessment. On 25 February 2007, The Daily Telegraph reported that the United States Fifth Fleet, including the Nimitz-class supercarriers Eisenhower, Nimitz and Stennis "prepares to take on Iran".
- In March 2006, it was reported that the US State Department had opened an Office of Iranian Affairs (OIA) – overseen by Elizabeth Cheney, the daughter of Vice President Dick Cheney. The office's mission was reportedly to promote a democratic transition in Iran. and to help "defeat" the Iranian regime. Iran argued the office was tasked with drawing up plans to overthrow its government. One Iranian reformer said after the office opened that many "partners are simply too afraid to work with us anymore", and that the office had "a chilling effect". The US Congress has reportedly appropriated more than $120 million to fund the project.
- The Bush Administration repeatedly refused to rule out use of nuclear weapons against Iran. The U.S. Nuclear Posture Review made public in 2002 specifically envisioned the use of nuclear weapons on a first strike basis, even against non-nuclear armed states. Investigative reporter Seymour Hersh reported in 2006 that the Bush administration had been planning the use of nuclear weapons against Iran. When specifically questioned about the potential use of nuclear weapons against Iran, President Bush claimed that "All options were on the table." According to the Bulletin of the Atomic Scientists, "the president of the United States directly threatened Iran with a preemptive nuclear strike. It is hard to read his reply in any other way."
- In September 2007, Condoleezza Rice, U.S. Secretary of State, cautioned the IAEA not to interfere with international diplomacy over Iran's alleged weapons program. She said the IAEA's role should be limited to carrying out inspections and offering a "clear declaration and clear reporting on what the Iranians are doing; whether and when and if they are living up to the agreements they have signed." Former IAEA Director General ElBaradei called for less emphasis on additional UN sanctions and more emphasis on enhanced cooperation between the IAEA and Tehran. Iran has agreed with IAEA requests to answer unresolved questions about its nuclear program. ElBaradei often criticized what he called "war mongering," only to be told by Rice to mind his business.
- In December 2007, the United States National Intelligence Estimate (which represents the consensus view of all 16 American spy agencies) concluded, with a "high level of confidence", that Iran had halted all of its nuclear weapons program in 2003 and that the program remains frozen. The new estimate says that the enrichment program could still provide Iran with enough raw material to produce a nuclear weapon sometime by the middle of next decade but that intelligence agencies "do not know whether it currently intends to develop nuclear weapons" at some future date. Senator Harry Reid, the majority leader, said he hoped the administration would "appropriately adjust its rhetoric and policy".
- On 2 February 2009, the thirtieth anniversary of the Islamic Revolution in Iran, Iran launched its first domestically produced satellite. Iran's President Mahmoud Ahmadinejad described the successful launching of the Omid data-processing satellite as a very big source of pride for Iran and said the project improved Iran's status in the world. The United States claimed Iran's activities could be linked to the development of a military nuclear capability and that the activities were of "great concern". The U.S. specifically said it would continue "to address the threats posed by Iran, including those related to its missile and nuclear programs." Despite the U.S. saying it would use all elements of its national power to deal with Tehran's actions, Iran said the launch was a step to remove the scientific monopoly certain world countries are trying to impose on the world. Iraqi National Security Advisor Muwafaq al-Rubaie said Iraq was very pleased with the launch of Iran's peaceful data-processing national satellite.
- In March 2009, Richard N. Haass, President of the Council on Foreign Relations, wrote that U.S. policy must be thoroughly multilateral and suggested recognizing Iranian enrichment while getting Iran to agree to limits on its enrichment. "In return, some of the current sanctions in place would be suspended. In addition, Iran should be offered assured access to adequate supplies of nuclear fuel for the purpose of producing electricity. Normalization of political ties could be part of the equation," Haass said. In October 2009, Ploughshares Fund President Joseph Cirincione outlined "five persistent myths about Iran's nuclear program": that Iran is on the verge of developing a nuclear weapon, that a military strike would knock out Iran's program, that "we can cripple Iran with sanctions", that a new government in Iran would abandon the nuclear program, and that Iran is the main nuclear threat in the Middle East.
- In 2009, Independent U.S. Security Consultant Linton F. Brooks wrote that in an ideal future "Iran has abandoned its plans for nuclear weapons due to consistent international pressure under joint U.S.–Russian leadership. Iran has implemented the Additional Protocol and developed commercial nuclear power under strict International Atomic Energy Agency (IAEA) safeguards using a fuel leasing approach with fuel supplied by Russia and spent fuel returned to Russia."
- A 2009 U.S. congressional research paper says U.S. intelligence believes Iran ended "nuclear weapon design and weaponization work" in 2003. The intelligence consensus was affirmed by leaders of the U.S. intelligence community. Some advisors within the Obama administration reaffirmed the intelligence conclusions, while other "top advisers" in the Obama administration "say they no longer believe the key finding of the 2007 National Intelligence Estimate". Thomas Fingar, former chairman of the National Intelligence Council until December 2008, said that the original 2007 National Intelligence Estimate on Iran "became contentious, in part, because the White House instructed the Intelligence Community to release an unclassified version of the report's key judgments but declined to take responsibility for ordering its release."
- Lieutenant General Ronald Burgess, the chief of the Defense Intelligence Agency, said in January 2010 that there is no evidence that Iran has made a decision to build a nuclear weapon and that the key findings of a 2007 National Intelligence Estimate are all still correct.
- On 20 July 2011, Frederick Fleitz, a former CIA analyst and House Intelligence Committee staff member, took issue with a February 2011 revision of the 2007 National Intelligence Estimate on Iran's nuclear weapons program in a Wall Street Journal op-ed titled "America's Intelligence Denial on Iran." In the op-ed, Fleitz claimed the new estimate had serious problems and underplayed the threat from Iran's pursuit of nuclear weapons program much as the 2007 version did. However, Fleitz stated that he was not permitted by CIA censors to discuss his specific concerns about the estimate. Fleitz also claimed the estimate had a four-member outside review board that he viewed as biased since three of the reviewers held the same ideological and political views and two of them were from the same Washington DC think tank. He noted that the CIA prevented him from releasing the names of the outside reviewers of the 2011 Iran estimate.
- Several high U.S. military and intelligence officials have stated that the effects of an Israeli attack on Iran's nuclear facilities would not be preventive. Defense Secretary Leon E. Panetta said in December 2011, and Lt. Gen. James R. Clapper, Director of National Intelligence, said in February 2012 that an Israeli attack would only delay Iran's program by one or two years. General Michael V. Hayden, former CIA Director, said in January 2012 that Israel was not able to inflict significant damage on Iran's nuclear sites. He said, "They only have the ability to make this worse." In February 2012, Admiral William J. Fallon, who retired in 2008 as head of U.S. Central Command, said, "No one that I'm aware of thinks that there's any real positive outcome of a military strike or some kind of conflict." He advocated negotiating with Iran and deterring Iran from aggressive actions and said, "Let's not precipitate something." General Martin Dempsey, Chairman of the Joint Chiefs of Staff, said in August 2012 that a unilateral Israeli attack on Iran would delay but not destroy Iran's nuclear program and that he did not wish to be "complicit" in such an attack. He also stated that sanctions were having an effect and should be given time to work, and that a premature attack might damage the 'international coalition' against Iran. Former Defense Secretary and former CIA Director Robert Gates stated in October 2012 that sanctions were beginning to have an effect and that "the results of an American or Israeli military strike on Iran could, in my view, prove catastrophic, haunting us for generations in that part of the world."
- In 2011, the senior officers of all of the major American intelligence agencies stated that there was no conclusive evidence that Iran has made any attempt to produce nuclear weapons since 2003.
- In January 2012, U.S. Defense Secretary Leon Panetta stated that Iran was pursuing a nuclear weapons capability, but was not attempting to produce nuclear weapons.
- In 2012, sixteen United States intelligence agencies, including the CIA, reported that Iran was pursuing research that could enable it to produce nuclear weapons, but was not attempting to do so.
- As of 2021, Joe Biden's Secretary of State Antony Blinken did not rule out a military intervention to stop Iran from obtaining nuclear weapons.
- In June 2023, an assessment by the U.S. Director of National Intelligence concluded that Iran was not developing nuclear weapons, though it was improving its nuclear capabilities, reporting that "Iran is not currently undertaking the key nuclear weapons-development activities that would be necessary to produce a testable nuclear device".

=== Other international responses ===
==== United Nations ====
In 2009, the United Nations built a seismic monitoring station in Turkmenistan near its border with Iran, to detect tremors from nuclear explosions. The UN Security Council has demanded Iran freeze all forms of uranium enrichment. Iran has argued these demands unfairly compel it to abandon its rights under the Nuclear NonProliferation Treaty to peaceful nuclear technology for civilian energy purposes.

On 29 December 2009, Zongo Saidou, a sanctions advisor for the U.N., said that as far as he knew, none of the U.N.'s member nations had alerted the sanctions committee about allegations of sales of uranium to Iran from Kazakhstan. "We don't have any official information yet regarding this kind of exchange between the two countries," Saidou said. "I don't have any information; I don't have any proof," Saidou said. An intelligence report from an unknown country alleged that rogue employees of Kazakhstan were prepared to sell Iran 1,350 tons of purified uranium ore in violation of UN Security Council sanctions. Russia said it had no knowledge of an alleged Iranian plan to import purified uranium ore from Kazakhstan. Kazakhstan denied the reports. "Such fabrications of news are part of the psychological warfare (against Iran) to serve the political interests of the hegemonic powers," Iran said. Askar Abdrahmanov, the official representative of the Ministry for Foreign Affairs of Kazakhstan, said "the references to the anonymous sources and unknown documents show groundlessness of these insinuations."

==== China ====
The Chinese Foreign Ministry supports the peaceful resolution of the Iran nuclear issue through diplomacy and negotiations. In May 2006 Chinese Foreign Ministry spokesperson Liu Jianchao stated "As a signatory to the Non-Proliferation Treaty, Iran enjoys the right to peaceful use of nuclear power, but it should also fulfil its corresponding responsibility and commitment". He added "It is urgently needed that Iran should fully cooperate with the IAEA and regain the confidence of the international community in its nuclear program".

In April 2008, several news agencies reported that China had supplied the IAEA with intelligence on Iran's nuclear program following a report by Associated Press reporter George Jahn based on anonymous diplomatic sources. Chinese Foreign Ministry spokesperson Jiang Yu described these reports as "completely groundless and out of ulterior motives".

In January 2010, China reiterated its calls for diplomatic efforts on the Iran nuclear issue over sanctions. "Dialogue and negotiations are the right ways of properly solving the Iran nuclear issue, and there is still room for diplomatic efforts," said Chinese spokesperson Jiang Yu. "We hope the relevant parties take more flexible and pragmatic measures and step up diplomatic efforts in a bid to resume talks as soon as possible," said Jiang.

In September 2011 Israeli newspaper Haaretz reported several statements about Iran's nuclear program and China's foreign policy in the Middle East, made by independent Chinese expert on the Middle East who recently visited Israel at the invitation of "Signal", an organization that furthers academic ties between Israel and China. Yin Gang of the Chinese Academy of Social Sciences has expressed his opinion on China policies toward region, and according to Haaretz he made surprising statement: "China is opposed to any military action against Iran that would damage regional stability and interfere with the flow of oil. But China will not stop Israel if it decides to attack Iran. For all these reasons, Israel and the Middle East need a country like China. Israel needs China's power."

In March 2012, Chinese foreign minister Yang Jiechi said that "China is opposed to any country in the Middle East, including Iran, developing and possessing nuclear weapons.", adding that Iran nonetheless has the right to pursue nuclear activities for peaceful purposes.

==== France ====
On 16 February 2006 French Foreign Minister Philippe Douste-Blazy said "No civilian nuclear programme can explain the Iranian nuclear programme. It is a clandestine military nuclear programme."

In January 2007, former French President Jacques Chirac, speaking "off the record" to reporters from The New York Times, indicated that if Iran possessed a nuclear weapon, the weapon could not be used. Chirac alluded to mutually assured destruction when he stated:

"Where will it drop it, this bomb? On Israel? It would not have gone 200 meters into the atmosphere before Tehran would be razed."

==== Russia ====
In 2005, Russian Advisor to Minister of Atomic Energy Lev Ryabev asserted that "neither the signing by Iran of the NPT, the adoption of the Additional Protocol (which provides for the right of inspection of any facility at any time with no prior notice), placement of nuclear facilities under IAEA safeguards, nor Russia's and Iran's commitments to repatriate spent nuclear fuel to Russia is seen as a good enough argument by the United States." Ryabev argued that "at the same time, such requirements are not imposed on, for example, Brazil, which has been developing its nuclear power industry and nuclear fuel cycle, including uranium enrichment." The same year, during a meeting with George W. Bush, Vladimir Putin expressed concern about Iran’s nuclear proliferation believing that some uranium and centrifuge components used by Iran were from Pakistan.

However, on 5 December 2007 Russian foreign minister Sergey Lavrov said he had seen no evidence of any nuclear weapons program in Iran, no matter how old. On 16 October 2007 Vladimir Putin visited Tehran, Iran to participate in the Second Caspian Summit, where he met with Iranian leader Mahmoud Ahmadinejad. At a press conference after the summit Putin said that "Iran has the right to develop their peaceful nuclear programs without any restrictions".

In 2009, Russian Major-General Pavel S. Zolotarev argued Iran's security could be partially be assured by supplying Iran with modern missile and air defense systems and offering for Iran to take part in the work of one of the data exchange centers in exchange for "concrete non-proliferation obligations".

In May 2009, the EastWest Institute released a joint U.S.-Russian Threat Assessment on Iran's Nuclear and Missile Potential. The report concluded that there was "no IRBM/ICBM threat from Iran and that such a threat, even if it were to emerge, is not imminent." The report said there was no specific evidence that Iran was seeking the ability to attack Europe and that "it is indeed difficult to imagine the circumstances in which Iran would do so." The report said if Iran did pursue this capability, it would need six to eight years to develop a missile capable of carrying a 1,000 kilogram warhead 2,000 kilometers. The report said Iran ending "IAEA containment and surveillance of the nuclear material and all installed cascades at the Fuel Enrichment Plan" might serve as an early warning of Iranian intentions.

Yevgeny Primakov, a former Russian prime minister considered the doyen of Moscow's Middle East experts, said he did "not believe that Iran had made a decision to acquire nuclear weapons. Russia has no concrete information that Iran is planning to construct a weapon. It may be more like Japan, which has nuclear readiness but does not have a bomb," Primakov said.

In February 2012, Russian Prime Minister Vladimir Putin said that Russia opposes Iran developing nuclear-weapons capability. "Russia is not interested in Iran becoming a nuclear power. It would lead to greater risks to international stability.", Putin said.

==== United Kingdom ====
The United Kingdom is part of the EU3+3 (UK, France, Germany, US, China and Russia) group of countries that are engaged in ongoing discussions with Iran. The UK is therefore one of the countries that has stated that Iran would be provided with enriched fuel and support to develop a modern nuclear power program if it, in the words of the Foreign Office spokesperson "suspends all enrichment related activities, answer all the outstanding issues relating to Iran's nuclear programme and implement the additional protocol agreed with the IAEA". The UK (with China, France, Germany and Russia) put forward the three Security Council resolutions that have been passed in the UN.

On 8 May 2006, Former Deputy Commander-in-Chief of British Land Forces, General Sir Hugh Beach, former Cabinet Ministers, scientists and campaigners joined a delegation to Downing Street opposing military intervention in Iran. The delegation delivered two letters to Prime Minister Tony Blair from 1,800 physicists warning that the military intervention and the use of nuclear weapons would have disastrous consequences for the security of Britain and the rest of world. The letters carried the signatures of academics, politicians and scientists including some of 5 physicists who are Nobel Laureates. CASMII delegation

In 2006 Boris Johnson, then a member of Parliament, argued in his newspaper column that it was reasonable for Iran to seek nuclear weapons and that a nuclear-armed Iran could make the Middle East more stable. On assuming office he called for a new deal.

==== Israel ====
Israel, which is not a party to the Nuclear Non-Proliferation Treaty and which is widely believed to possess nuclear weapons, has frequently claimed that Iran is actively pursuing a nuclear weapons program. Arguing an "existential threat from Iran", Israel has issued several veiled and explicit threats to attack Iran. Mike Mullen, former chairman of the U.S. Joint Chiefs of Staff, has cautioned that an Israeli air attack on Iran would be high-risk and warned against Israel striking Iran.

George Friedman, head of the global intelligence company Stratfor, has said Iran is "decades away" from developing any credible nuclear-arms capacity and that an attack on Iran would have grave repercussions for the global economy. If Iran ever did develop nuclear weapons, Israeli academic Avner Cohen said "that the prospect of a deliberate Iranian first nuclear strike on Israel, an out-of the-blue scenario, is virtually nonexistent... [T]he chances of Iran – or for that matter any other nuclear power – unleashing a nuclear strike against Israel, which has nuclear capabilities itself, strike me as close to zero."

Walter Pincus of the Washington Post has written that Israel's stance on nuclear arms complicates efforts against Iran. Gawdat Bahgat of the National Defense University believes Iran's nuclear program is partially formed on the potential threat of a nuclear Israel. Iran and the Arab League have proposed that the Middle East be established as a Nuclear Weapon Free Zone. Israel said in May 2010 it would not consider taking part in nuclear weapon-free zone discussions or joining the Nuclear Nonproliferation Treaty. The UN Security Council has also pushed for a nuclear-weapon free zone in the Middle East, and has urged all countries to sign and adhere the 1970 Nuclear Nonproliferation Treaty.

In May 2010, Israel reportedly deployed Dolphin class submarines with nuclear missiles capable of reaching any target in Iran in the Persian Gulf. Their reported missions were to deter Iran, gather intelligence, and to potentially land Mossad agents on the Iranian coast. In 2018, the Israeli prime minister said that the Mossad seized about one hundred thousand documents of Iran's nuclear program.

=== Netherlands ===
According to a Dutch newspaper, the Netherlands had launched an operation to infiltrate and sabotage the Iranian weapons industry, but ended the operation due to increasing fears of an American or Israeli attack on Iran's nuclear facilities.

=== Muslim countries ===
The A.Q. Khan network, established to procure equipment and material for Pakistan's nuclear weapons program (gas-centrifuge-based programme), also supplied Iran with critical technology for its uranium enrichment program, and helped "put Iran on a fast track toward becoming a nuclear weapons power."

The 2008 Annual Arab Public Opinion Poll, Survey of the Anwar Sadat Chair for Peace and Development at the University of Maryland, College Park conducted in Egypt, Jordan, Lebanon, Morocco, Saudi Arabia and the UAE in March 2008 noted the following as a key finding.

"In contrast with the fears of many Arab governments, the Arab public does not appear to see Iran as a major threat. Most believe that Iran has the right to its nuclear program and do not support international pressure to force it to curtail its program. A plurality of Arabs (44%) believes that if Iran were to acquire nuclear weapons, the outcome would be more positive for the region than negative."

Indonesia, the world's most populous Muslim-majority nation and a non-permanent member of the U.N. Security Council abstained from a vote in March 2008 on a U.N. resolution to impose a third set of sanctions on Iran. It was the only country out of the 10 non-permanent members to abstain.

Pakistan, which has the second largest Muslim population in the world is not a member of the Nuclear Non-Proliferation Treaty and already possesses nuclear weapons.

On 12 May 2006 AP published an interview with Pakistan's former Chief of Army Staff of Pakistan Army General Mirza Aslam Beg In the AP interview, Beg detailed nearly 20 years of Iranian approaches to obtain conventional arms and then technology for nuclear weapons. He described an Iranian visit in 1990, when he was Chief of Army Staff.

They didn't want the technology. They asked: 'Can we have a bomb?' My answer was: By all means you can have it but you must make it yourself. Nobody gave it to us.

Beg said he is sure Iran has had enough time to develop them. But he insists the Pakistani government didn't help, even though he says former Prime Minister Benazir Bhutto once told him the Iranians offered more than $4 billion for the technology.

In an article in 2005 about nuclear proliferation he stated

"I would not like my future generations to live in the neighborhood of "nuclear capable Israel.""
"Countries acquire the (nuclear) capability on their own, as we have done it. Iran will do the same, because they are threatened by Israel."

The San Francisco Chronicle reported on 31 October 2003, that Grand Ayatollahs, like Ayatollah Yousef Sanei, and Iranian clerics led by Ayatollah Ali Khamenei have repeatedly declared that Islam forbids the development and use of all weapons of mass destruction. SFGate.com quoted Ayatollah Ali Khamenei as saying:

"The Islamic Republic of Iran, based on its fundamental religious and legal beliefs, would never resort to the use of weapons of mass destruction. In contrast to the propaganda of our enemies, fundamentally we are against any production of weapons of mass destruction in any form."

On 21 April 2006, at a Hamas rally in Damascus, Anwar Raja, the Lebanon-based representative of the Popular Front for the Liberation of Palestine, a party that achieved 4.25% of the votes and holds 3 out the 132 seats in the Palestinian Legislative Council following the election declared:

"The Muslim, Iranian, fighting people now possess nuclear capabilities. My brother, the Iranian representative sitting here, let me tell you that we, the Palestinian people, are in favour of Iran having a nuclear bomb, not just energy for peaceful purposes."

On 3 May 2006 Iraqi Shia cleric Ayatollah Ahmad Husseini Al Baghdadi, who opposes the presence of US forces in Iraq and is an advocate of violent jihad was interviewed on Syrian TV. In his interview he said:

"How can they face Iran? How come Israel has 50 nuclear bombs? Why are they selective? Why shouldn't an Islamic or Arab country have a nuclear bomb? I am not referring to the Iranian program, which the Iranians say is for peaceful purposes. I am talking about a nuclear bomb."
"This Arab Islamic nation must obtain a nuclear bomb. Without a nuclear bomb, we will continue to be oppressed,"

==== Baku declaration ====
A declaration signed on 20 June 2006 by the foreign ministers of 56 nations of the 57-member Organisation of the Islamic Conference stated that "the only way to resolve Iran's nuclear issue is to resume negotiations without any preconditions and to enhance co-operation with the involvement of all relevant parties".

==== Qatar and Arab vote against the U.N. Security Council resolution ====
31 July 2006: The UN Security Council gives until 31 August 2006 for Iran to suspend all uranium enrichment and related activities or face the prospect of sanctions. The draft passed by a vote of 14–1 (Qatar, which represents Arab states on the council, opposing). The same day, Iran's U.N. Ambassador Javad Zarif qualified the resolution as "arbitrary" and illegal because the NTP protocol explicitly guarantees under international law Iran's right to pursue nuclear activities for peaceful purposes. In response to today's vote at the UN, Iranian President Mahmoud Ahmadinejad said that his country will revise his position vis-à-vis the economic/incentive package offered previously by the G-6 (5 permanent Security council members plus Germany.)

In December 2006, the Gulf Cooperation Council called for a nuclear weapons free Middle East and recognition of the right of a country to expertise in the field of nuclear energy for peaceful purposes.

=== Non-Aligned Movement ===
The Non-Aligned Movement has said that the present situation whereby Nuclear Weapon States monopolise the right to possess nuclear weapons is "highly discriminatory", and they have pushed for steps to accelerate the process of nuclear disarmament.

On 16 September 2006 in Havana, Cuba, all of the 118 Non-Aligned Movement member countries, at the summit level, declared supporting Iran's nuclear program for civilian purposes in their final written statement. That is a clear majority of the 192 countries comprising the entire United Nations, which comprise 55% of the world population.

On 11 September 2007 the Non-Aligned Movement rejected any "interference" in Iran's nuclear transparency deal with U.N. inspectors by Western countries through the UN Security Council.

On 30 July 2008 the Non-Aligned Movement welcomed the continuing cooperation of Iran with the IAEA and reaffirmed Iran's right to the peaceful uses of nuclear technology. The movement further called for the establishment of a nuclear weapons free zone in the Middle East and called for a comprehensive multilaterally negotiated instrument which prohibits threats of attacks on nuclear facilities devoted to peaceful uses of nuclear energy.

== Biological weapons ==
Iran ratified the Biological Weapons Convention on 22 August 1973.

Iran has advanced biology and genetic engineering research programs supporting an industry that produces world-class vaccines for both domestic use and export. The dual-use nature of these facilities means that Iran, like any country with advanced biological research programs, could easily produce biological warfare agents.

A 2005 report from the United States Department of State claimed that Iran began work on offensive biological weapons during the Iran–Iraq War, and that their large legitimate bio-technological and bio-medical industry "could easily hide pilot to industrial-scale production capabilities for a potential BW program, and could mask procurement of BW-related process equipment". The report further said that "available information about Iranian activities indicates a maturing offensive program with a rapidly evolving capability that may soon include the ability to deliver these weapons by a variety of means".

According to the Nuclear Threat Initiative, Iran is known to possess cultures of the many biological agents for legitimate scientific purposes which have been weaponised by other nations in the past, or could theoretically be weaponised. Although they do not allege that Iran has attempted to weaponise them, Iran possesses sufficient biological facilities to potentially do so.

== Chemical weapons ==
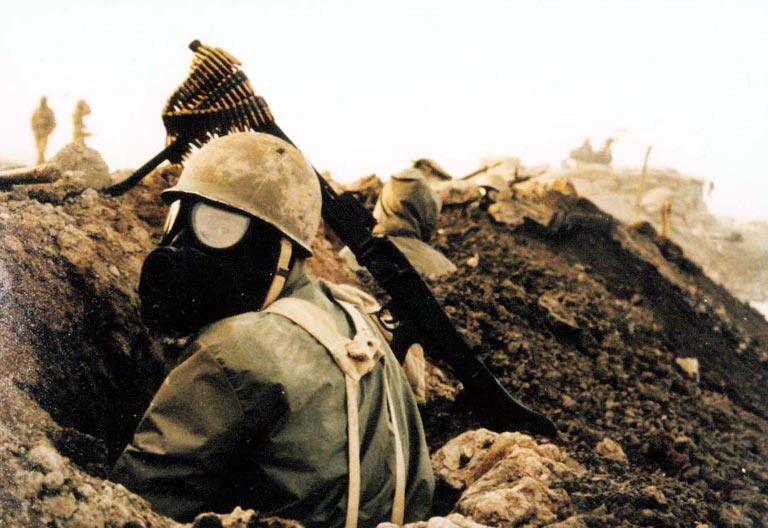
Iranian soldier with gas mask under chemical bombardment by Iraqi forces in the battlefield during the Iran–Iraq War

Iran has experienced attack by chemical warfare (CW) on the battlefield and suffered hundreds of thousands of casualties, both civilian and military, in such attacks during the 1980–88 Iran–Iraq War. Iran was completely unprepared for chemical warfare and did not have sufficient gas masks for its troops. Due to sanctions, Iran had to purchase gas masks from North Korea or commercial painting respirator masks bought from the West. Iran is not known to have resorted to using chemical weapons in retaliation for Iraqi chemical weapons attacks during the Iran–Iraq War despite the fact it would have been legally entitled to do so under the then-existing international treaties on the use of chemical weapons which only prohibited the first use of such weapons. Still Iran did develop a chemical-weapons-program during the latter part of that war, and in 1989, The New York Times reported that Iran started a major campaign to produce and stockpile chemical weapons after a truce was agreed with Iraq.

On 13 January 1993 Iran signed the Chemical Weapons Convention (CWC) and ratified it on 3 November 1997. In the official declaration submitted to the Organisation for the Prohibition of Chemical Weapons (OPCW), the Iranian government acknowledged that it had developed a chemical weapons program in the 1980s but asserted that it had since ceased the program and destroyed the stockpiles of operational weapons.

In an interview with Gareth Porter, Mohsen Rafighdoost, the Minister of the Islamic Revolutionary Guard Corps throughout the eight-year Iran-Iraq war, described how supreme leader Ayatollah Khomeini had twice blocked his proposal to begin working on both nuclear and chemical weapons to counter Iraqi chemical attacks, which Rafighdoost interpreted as a fatwa against their use and production, because it was issued by the "guardian jurist".

A U.S. Central Intelligence Agency report dated January 2001 speculated that Iran had manufactured and stockpiled chemical weapons – including blister, blood, choking, and probably nerve agents, and the bombs and artillery shells to deliver them. It further claimed that during the first half of 2001, Iran continued to seek production technology, training, expertise, equipment, and chemicals from entities in Russia and China that could be used to help Iran reach its goal of having indigenous nerve agent production capability. However the certainty of this assessment declined and in 2007 the U.S. Defense Intelligence Agency limited its public assessment to just noting that "Iran has a large and growing commercial chemical industry that could be used to support a chemical agent mobilization capability."

Iran is a signatory of the Chemical Weapons Convention, which bans chemical weapons, delivery systems, and production facilities. Iran has reiterated its commitment to the CWC and its full support for the work of the OPCW, in particular in view of the considerable suffering these weapons have caused to the Iranian people. Iran has not made any declaration of a weapons stockpile under the treaty.

In 2016 Iranian chemists synthesised five Novichok nerve agents, originally developed in the Soviet Union, for analysis and produced detailed mass spectral data which was added to the OPCW Central Analytical Database. Previously there had been no detailed descriptions of their spectral properties in open scientific literature.

== Delivery systems ==
=== Missiles ===
A Shahab-4 with a range of 2,000 km and a payload of 1,000 kg is believed to be under development. Iran has stated the Shahab-3 is the last of its war missiles and the Shahab-4 is being developed to give the country the capability of launching communications and surveillance satellites. A Shahab-5, an intercontinental ballistic missile with a 10,000 km range, has been alleged but not proven to be under development.

In 2017, Iran tested the Khorramshahr, an MRBM that can carry an 1800 kg payload over 2000 km.

Iran has 12 X-55 long range cruise missiles purchased without nuclear warheads from Ukraine in 2001. The X-55 has a range of 2,500 to 3,000 kilometers.

Iran's most advanced missile, the Fajr-3, has an unknown range but is estimated to be 2,500 km. The missile is radar evading and can strike targets simultaneously using multiple warheads.

On 2 November 2006, Iran fired unarmed missiles to begin 10 days of military war games. Iranian state television reported "dozens of missiles were fired including Shahab-2 and Shahab-3 missiles. The missiles had ranges from 300 km to up to 2,000 km...Iranian experts have made some changes to Shahab-3 missiles installing cluster warheads in them with the capacity to carry 1,400 bombs." These launches come after some United States-led military exercises in the Persian Gulf on 30 October 2006, meant to train for blocking the transport of weapons of mass destruction.

The Sejil is a two-stage, solid-propellant, surface-to-surface missile (SSM) produced by Iran with a reported 1,930 km (1,200 mi) range. A successful test launch took place on 12 November 2008.

According to Janes Information Services, details of the design other than the number of stages and that it uses solid fuel have not been released. Uzi Ruben, former director of Israel's Ballistic Missile Defense Organization, indicated that, "Unlike other Iranian missiles, the Sajil bears no resemblance to any North Korean, Russian, Chinese or Pakistani (missile technology). It demonstrates a significant leap in Iran's missile capabilities." Ruben went on to state that the Sejil-1 " ... places Iran in the realm of multiple-stage missiles, which means that they are on the way to having intercontinental ballistic missile (ICBM) capabilities ..." As a weapon, the Sejil-1 presents much more challenge to Iran's potential enemies, as solid-fuel missiles can be launched with much less notice than liquid-fueled missiles, making them more difficult to strike prior to launch.

Sejil-2 is an upgraded version of the Sejil. The Sejil-2 two-stage solid-fuel missile has a 2,000 km range and was first test fired on 20 May 2009. The Sejil-2 surface-to-surface medium-range ballistic missile (MRBM) was first tested eight months prior to the actual test launch, which took place in the central Iranian province of Semnan. Improvements include better navigation system, better targeting system, more payload, longer range, faster lift-off, longer storage time, quicker launch, and lower detection possibility.

Iran's ballistic missiles
Name/Designation	Class	Range (varies with payload weight)	Payload	Status
Fajr-3	MRBM	2,000 km	800 kg	Operational
Shahab-2	SRBM	300–2,000 km	1200 kg	Operational
Shahab-3//Emad/Ghadr-110	MRBM	2,100 km	990 kg	Operational
Shahab-4	MRBM	2,000 km	2,000 kg	Under Development
Sejil-1	MRBM	1,930 km	Unknown	Operational
Sejil-2	MRBM	2,000 km	Unknown	Operational
Khorramshahr	MRBM	2,000 km	1800 kg	Testing phase

=== Aircraft ===
Any aircraft could potentially be used to host some form of WMD distribution system. Iran has a varied air force with aircraft purchased from many countries, including the United States. Due to sanctions, the Iranian government has encouraged the domestic production of aircraft and, since 2002, has built its own transport aircraft, fighters, and gunship helicopters.

== See also ==
- AMAD Project
- American strikes on Iranian nuclear sites
- Nuclear program of Iran
- Nuclear facilities in Iran
- Joint Comprehensive Plan of Action
- United Nations Security Council Resolution 1747
- Operation Merlin
- Green Salt Project
- Iranian Space Agency
