= Tazian =

Tazian or Taziyan or Tazeyan (Persian: تازيان) may refer to:

- Tazian-e Bala, Hormozgan Province
- Tazian-e Pain, Hormozgan Province
- Tazian Rural District, in Hormozgan Province
- Tazian, former name of Golzar, Kerman
