= Ab Zaminu =

Ab Zaminu اب زمينو
- Village
- Location within Iran
- Coordinates: 27°35′59″N 56°19′20″E
- Country: Iran
- Province: Hormozgan
- County: Bandar Abbas
- Bakhsh: Central
- Rural District: Isin

Population (2006)
  - Total: 284
- Time zone: UTC+3:30 (IRST)
  - Summer (DST): UTC+4:30 (IRDT)

Ab Zaminu (Persian: اب زمينو, also Romanized as Āb Zamīnū and Āb Zaminoo; also known as Āb Zamīna) is a village in Isin Rural District, in the Central District of Bandar Abbas County, Hormozgan province, Iran. At the 2006 census, its population was 284, in 60 families.
