= Mazghu =

Mazghu مازغو
- Village
- Location within Iran
- Coordinates: 27°39′38″N 56°31′27″E
- Country: Iran
- Province: Hormozgan
- County: Bandar Abbas
- Bakhsh: Central
- Rural District: Isin

Population (2006)
  - Total: 35
- Time zone: UTC+3:30 (IRST)
  - Summer (DST): UTC+4:30 (IRDT)

Mazghu (Persian: مازغو, also Romanized as Māzghū) is a village in Isin Rural District, in the Central District of Bandar Abbas County, Hormozgan Province, Iran. At the 2006 census, its population was 35, in 9 families.
