= Shahrak-e Sarkhadh =

Shahrak-e Sarkhadh شهرك سرخاڈ
- Village
- Location within Iran
- Coordinates: 27°40′45″N 56°31′24″E
- Country: Iran
- Province: Hormozgan
- County: Bandar Abbas
- Bakhsh: Central
- Rural District: Isin

Population (2006)
  - Total: 105
- Time zone: UTC+3:30 (IRST)
  - Summer (DST): UTC+4:30 (IRDT)

Shahrak-e Sarkhadh (Persian: شهرك سرخاڈ, also Romanized as Shahrak-e Sarkhādh; also known as Sarkhā, Shahrak-e Sarkhā, and Sorkhā) is a village in Isin Rural District, in the Central District of Bandar Abbas County, Hormozgan Province, Iran. At the 2006 census, its population was 105, in 33 families.
