= Suderu =

Suderu سودرو
- Village
- Location within Iran
- Coordinates: 27°12′01″N 55°57′51″E
- Country: Iran
- Province: Hormozgan
- County: Bandar Abbas
- Bakhsh: Central
- Rural District: Tazian

Population (2006)
  - Total: 708
- Time zone: UTC+3:30 (IRST)
  - Summer (DST): UTC+4:30 (IRDT)

Suderu (Persian: سودرو, also Romanized as Sūderū, Soodroo, and Sūdrū) is a village in Tazian Rural District, in the Central District of Bandar Abbas County, Hormozgan Province, Iran. At the 2006 census, its population was 708, in 138 families.
