= Mezraku =

Mezraku مزراكو
- Village
- Location within Iran
- Coordinates: 27°34′33″N 56°28′38″E
- Country: Iran
- Province: Hormozgan
- County: Bandar Abbas
- Bakhsh: Central
- Rural District: Isin

Population (2006)
  - Total: 107
- Time zone: UTC+3:30 (IRST)
  - Summer (DST): UTC+4:30 (IRDT)

Mezraku (Persian: مزراكو, also Romanized as Mezrākū; also known as Mezrākūh) is a village in Isin Rural District, in the Central District of Bandar Abbas County, Hormozgan Province, Iran. At the 2006 census, its population was 107, in 30 families.
