= Banuband-e Patil =

Banuband-e Patil بنوبندپاتل
- Village
- Location within Iran
- Coordinates: 27°17′51″N 56°10′58″E
- Country: Iran
- Province: Hormozgan
- County: Bandar Abbas
- Bakhsh: Central
- Rural District: Tazian

Population (2006)
  - Total: 706
- Time zone: UTC+3:30 (IRST)
  - Summer (DST): UTC+4:30 (IRDT)

Banuband-e Patil (Persian: بنوبندپاتل, also Romanized as Banūband-e Pātīl and Banū Band-e Pātīl; also known as Pātal-e Banū Band, Pātal-e Posht-e Banūband, Pātal Posht Benūband, and Pātīl Posht-e Banū Band) is a village in Tazian Rural District, in the Central District of Bandar Abbas County, Hormozgan Province, Iran. At the 2006 census, its population was 706, in 146 families.
