= Banuband-e Pasang =

Banuband-e Pasang بنوبندپاسنگ
- Village
- Location within Iran
- Coordinates: 27°19′08″N 56°11′13″E
- Country: Iran
- Province: Hormozgan
- County: Bandar Abbas
- Bakhsh: Central
- Rural District: Tazian

Population (2006)
  - Total: 693
- Time zone: UTC+3:30 (IRST)
  - Summer (DST): UTC+4:30 (IRDT)

Banuband-e Pasang (Persian: بنوبندپاسنگ, also Romanized as Banūband-e Pāsang; also known as Banūband-e Pāsīan and Benū Band-e Pāsang) is a village in Tazian Rural District, in the Central District of Bandar Abbas County, Hormozgan Province, Iran. At the 2006 census, its population was 693, in 144 families.
