= Tang-e Bagh, Hormozgan =

Tang-e Bagh تنگ باغ
- Village
- Location within Iran
- Coordinates: 27°28′09″N 56°12′54″E
- Country: Iran
- Province: Hormozgan
- County: Bandar Abbas
- Bakhsh: Central
- Rural District: Isin

Population (2006)
  - Total: 117
- Time zone: UTC+3:30 (IRST)
  - Summer (DST): UTC+4:30 (IRDT)

Tang-e Bagh (Persian: تنگ باغ, also Romanized as Tang-e Bāgh) is a village in Isin Rural District, in the Central District of Bandar Abbas County, Hormozgan Province, Iran. At the 2006 census, its population was 117, in 32 families.
