= Banuband =

Banuband بنوبند
- Village
- Location within Iran
- Coordinates: 27°19′07″N 56°11′30″E
- Country: Iran
- Province: Hormozgan
- County: Bandar Abbas
- Bakhsh: Central
- Rural District: Tazian

Population (2006)
  - Total: 586
- Time zone: UTC+3:30 (IRST)
  - Summer (DST): UTC+4:30 (IRDT)

Banuband (Persian: بنوبند, also Romanized as Banūband, Banooband, Banū Band, Benū Band, and Bonūband) is a village in Tazian Rural District, in the Central District of Bandar Abbas County, Hormozgan Province, Iran. At the 2006 census, its population was 586, in 123 families.
