= Ab Qalamun =

Ab Qalamun اب قلمون
- Village
- Location within Iran
- Coordinates: 27°37′02″N 56°23′43″E
- Country: Iran
- Province: Hormozgan
- County: Bandar Abbas
- Bakhsh: Central
- Rural District: Isin

Population (2006)
  - Total: 49
- Time zone: UTC+3:30 (IRST)
  - Summer (DST): UTC+4:30 (IRDT)

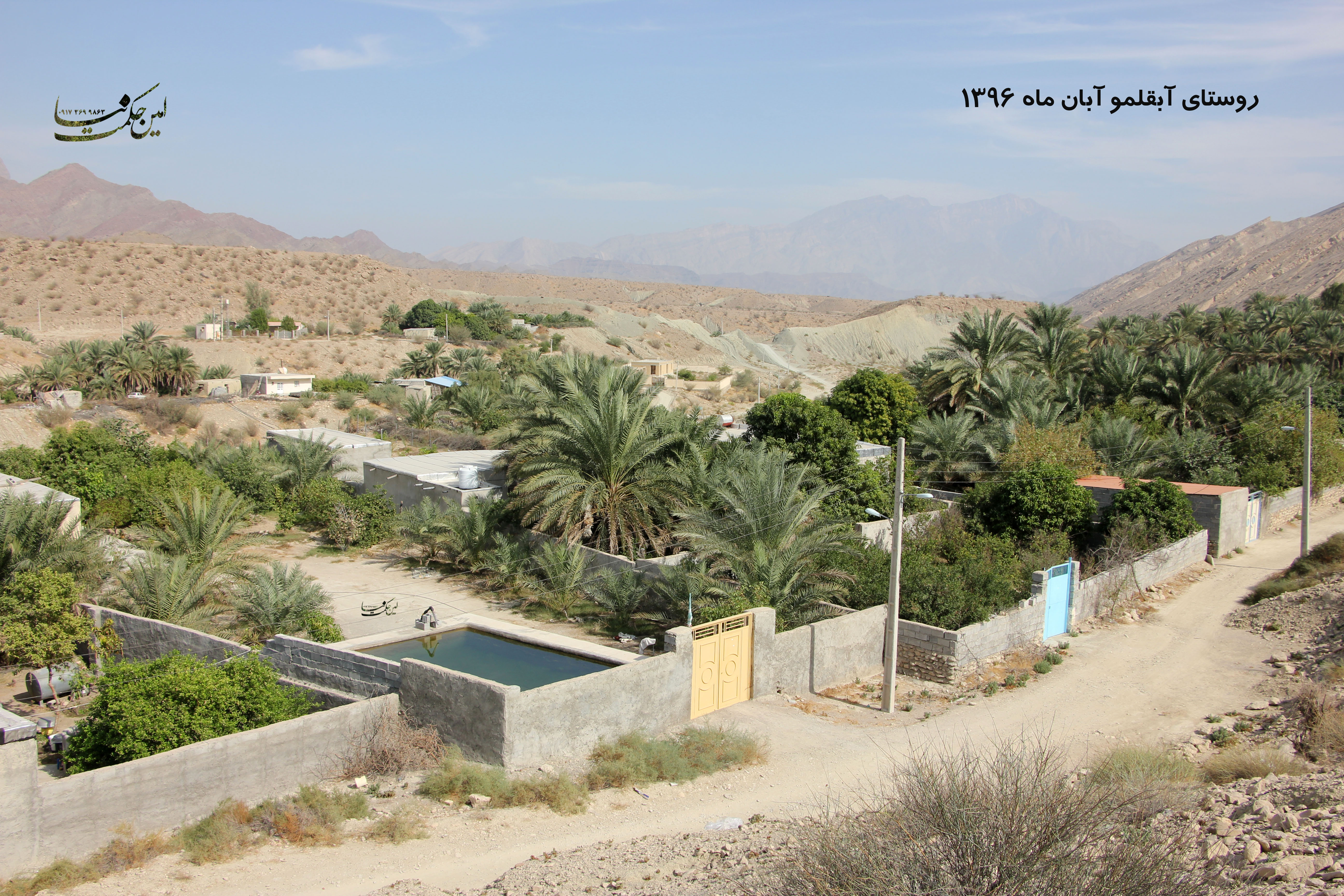
Ab Qalamun village

Ab Qalamun (Persian: اب قلمون, also Romanized as Āb Qalamūn; also known as Āb Qalamū) is a village in Isin Rural District, in the Central District of Bandar Abbas County, Hormozgan province, Iran. At the 2006 census, its population was 49, in 18 families.
