= Iranian underground missile bases =

Underground missile bases Missile Cities
- پایگاه های موشکی زیرزمینی ایران
- Unknown, multiple locations in Iran
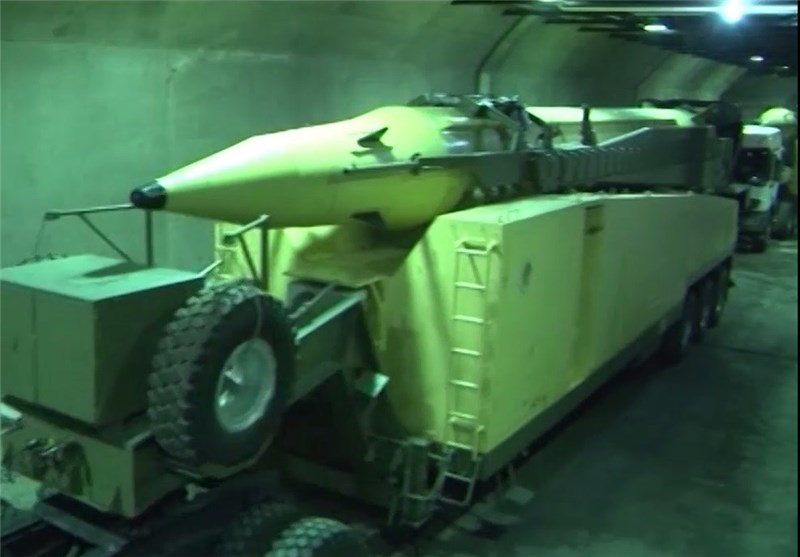
- Photograph of a missile city released by the IRGC Aerospace Force

Site information
- Type: Missile bases
- Operator: IRGC Aerospace Force

According to Iranian authorities, Iranian underground missile bases or silos (Persian: پایگاه های موشکی زیرزمینی ایران), also known as the Missile Cities (Persian: شهرهای موشکی) exist in all provinces and cities of Iran. The bases contain road-mobile transporter erector launcher trucks, along with other hardware.

== History ==
In October 2015, a video from one of the missile sites was released for the first time by Brigadier General Amir Ali Hajizadeh, commander of Aerospace Force of the Army of the Guardians of the Islamic Revolution. This was a few days after news of the testing of a new-generation medium-range ballistic missile, the Emad, was broadcast by the state media of Iran. Amir Ali Hajizadeh stated that: "Iranian missiles of varying ranges are ready to be launched from underground bases once Supreme Leader Ayatollah Ali Khamenei orders to do so," adding that "Iran created missile bases in all the provinces and cities throughout the country at a depth of 500 meters."

In January 2016, the bases were again displayed on TV, amid heightened tensions with Saudi Arabia following the execution of Shi`ìte cleric Nimr al-Nimr. The second-in-command of the Revolutionary Guards boasted that Iran's depots and underground facilities were so full that it didn't know where to store new missiles.

In 2020, video and photos of an underground ballistic missile base in Iran emerged, in which groups of ballistic missiles are shown to be ready for launch and are transported via an automated railway-type system through cavernous tunnels of a subterranean bunker. The missiles were shown to be stored vertically in "magazines" which would allow them to be launched in rapid succession, since each missile is already placed on an individual ready-to-fire platform, there is no need for cranes or trans-loaders to prepare them for launch.

On 26 March 2025, Iranian media released a video showing Iranian Armed Forces Chief of Staff General Mohammad Bagheri and Amir Ali Hajizadeh, the Islamic Revolutionary Guards Corps Aerospace Force commander, inspecting an allegedly new massive underground missile base, dubbed a "Missile City" by Iran. In the video, the two IRGC commanders are seen riding through extensive tunnel systems lined with vehicles loaded with advanced weaponry and missiles, including the liquid fuel propelled Ghadr-H and Emad missiles as well as the solid fuel propelled Khaibar Shekan, Sejil, and Haj Qassem ballistic missiles in addition to Paveh Land Attack Cruise Missiles. The video was released after the US issued a two month ultimatum demanding that Iran abandon its nuclear aspirations and missile program. According to Newsweek, the footage was released both as propaganda, and as a warning to Iran's adversaries. However, it also showcases the facility's vulnerability in its open storage of missiles, as opposed to storage in separated revetments, and the absence of blast doors or reinforced barriers between sections, making secondary explosions in the facility catastrophic if it were to be compromised.

On 10 November 2026, the IRGC released footage of what it described as a new underground "missile city," with an expert confirming that the footage shows the IRGC is working to reduce the radar signature of its missiles, making them harder to detect and intercept, as well as a warhead developed for the Fattah-1 ballistic missile mounted on a Kheibar Shekan missile, giving it more advanced maneuvering capabilities while in flight.

== Analysis ==
The release of the footage of the Iranian underground missile bases provided the situation for the lawmakers to show that the July nuclear deal had not weakened the military of Iran and it was a show of strength by Iran in response to the western powers, especially the US, speaking of military options against Iran in spite of the nuclear deal, according to The Guardian. Hajizadeh said that Iran was not seeking to start a war but "if enemies make a mistake, missile bases will erupt like a volcano from the depth of earth."

According to Tal Inbar, a senior Israeli defense expert and head of the Space Research Center at the Fisher Institute for Air and Space Strategic Studies in Herzliya, this missile base "enables the Islamic Republic to store and covertly fire surface-to-surface missiles." He described the underground facility, whose location is unknown, as a "complex system of enormous tunnels". He also added that those bases could be used by Iran for "a surprise barrage missile attack".

== Estimated number ==
According to Amir Ali Hajizadeh, commander of the Aerospace Force of the Islamic Revolutionary Guard Corps: "If we have an unveiling of missile cities every week, it won’t be finished for another two years." Meanwhile, Iranian Students' News Agency refers to the phrase "hundreds of underground missile bases of the IRGC Aerospace Force."

== List of identified missile bases ==
Missile base	Province
Khorramabad Underground Missile Base Most missile silos on a base in the nation	Lorestan
Kenesht Canyon Underground Base North	Kermanshah
Panj Pelleh Underground Missile Base	Kermanshah
Bakhtaran Missile Base	Kermanshah
Underground missile base	Qom
Underground missile base	Khorasan (Eastern Alborz mountain range)
Khaji Abad missile base	Hormozgan
Suspected underground missile base	Hormozgan (Khorgu)
Suspected underground missile base	Fars (Shiraz)
Isfahan Missile Complex	Isfahan

== See also ==
- Nuclear facilities in Iran
- List of Iranian Air Force bases
- Underground Great Wall of China
- Emad (missile)
- Missile Magazine System
