= Mashkar =

Mashkar (Persian: ماشكار) may refer to:

- Mashkar, Hormozgan
- Mashkar, Khuzestan
