= Shahrak-e Shahid Namju =

Shahrak-e Shahid Namju شهرك شهيدنامجو
- Village
- Country: Iran
- Province: Hormozgan
- County: Bandar Abbas
- Bakhsh: Central
- Rural District: Isin

Population (2006)
  - Total: 1,438
- Time zone: UTC+3:30 (IRST)
  - Summer (DST): UTC+4:30 (IRDT)

Shahrak-e Shahid Namju (Persian: شهرك شهيدنامجو, also Romanized as Shahrak-e Shahīd Nāmjū) is a village in Isin Rural District, in the Central District of Bandar Abbas County, Hormozgan Province, Iran. At the 2006 census, its population was 1,438, in 473 families.
