= Sar Rig-e Owl =

Sar Rig-e Owl سرريگ اول
- Village
- Location within Iran
- Coordinates: 27°18′04″N 56°16′36″E
- Country: Iran
- Province: Hormozgan
- County: Bandar Abbas
- Bakhsh: Central
- Rural District: Isin

Population (2006)
  - Total: 706
- Time zone: UTC+3:30 (IRST)
  - Summer (DST): UTC+4:30 (IRDT)

Sar Rig-e Owl (Persian: سرريگ اول, also Romanized as Sar Rīg-e Owl; also known as Sar Rīg-e Yek and Sarrīq-e Meygūnī) is a village in Isin Rural District, in the Central District of Bandar Abbas County, Hormozgan Province, Iran. At the 2006 census, its population was 706, in 161 families.
