= Shahrow, Tazian =

Shahrow شهرو
- Village
- Location within Iran
- Coordinates: 27°16′04″N 56°06′29″E
- Country: Iran
- Province: Hormozgan
- County: Bandar Abbas
- Bakhsh: Central
- Rural District: Tazian

Population (2006)
  - Total: 1,790
- Time zone: UTC+3:30 (IRST)
  - Summer (DST): UTC+4:30 (IRDT)

Shahrow (Persian: شهرو, also Romanized as Shahroo, Shāhrū, and Shahrū; also known as Maḩalleh-ye Pā’īn-e Shahrū, Maḩalleh-ye Pā’īn Shahrū) is a village in Tazian Rural District, in the Central District of Bandar Abbas County, Hormozgan Province, Iran. At the 2006 census, its population was 1,790, in 369 families.
