= Tazian-e Bala =

Tazian-e Bala تازيان بالا
- Village
- Location within Iran
- Coordinates: 27°18′52″N 56°09′47″E
- Country: Iran
- Province: Hormozgan
- County: Bandar Abbas
- Bakhsh: Central
- Rural District: Tazian

Population (2006)
  - Total: 1,414
- Time zone: UTC+3:30 (IRST)
  - Summer (DST): UTC+4:30 (IRDT)

Tazian-e Bala (Persian: تازيان بالا, also Romanized as Tāzīān-e Bālā and Tāzeyan-e Bālā) is a village in Tazian Rural District, in the Central District of Bandar Abbas County, Hormozgan Province, Iran. At the 2006 census, its population was 1,414, in 302 families.
