= Qalat-e Bala =

Village in Hormozgan province, Iran

Qalat-e Bala Persian: قلات بالا
- Village
- Location within Iran
- Coordinates: 27°19′10″N 56°05′33″E
- Country: Iran
- Province: Hormozgan
- County: Bandar Abbas
- District: Central
- Rural District: Tazian

Population (2016)
  - Total: 2,223
- Time zone: UTC+3:30 (IRST)

Qalat-e Bala (Persian: قلات بالا) (Note: Also romanized as Qalāt-e Bālā; also known as Kalāt and Kalāt-e Bālā) is a village in Tazian Rural District of the Central District of Bandar Abbas County, Hormozgan province, Iran.

== Demographics ==
=== Population ===
At the time of the 2006 National Census, the village's population was 2,898 in 650 households. The following census in 2011 counted 3,465 people in 902 households. The 2016 census measured the population of the village as 2,223 people in 626 households. It was the most populous village in its rural district.
