= Sar Rig-e Sum =

Sar Rig-e Sum سرريگ سوم
- Village
- Location within Iran
- Coordinates: 27°18′12″N 56°16′01″E
- Country: Iran
- Province: Hormozgan
- County: Bandar Abbas
- Bakhsh: Central
- Rural District: Isin

Population (2006)
  - Total: 248
- Time zone: UTC+3:30 (IRST)
  - Summer (DST): UTC+4:30 (IRDT)

Sar Rig-e Sum (Persian: سرريگ سوم, also Romanized as Sar Rīg-e Sūm; also known as Sar Rīg-e Seh) is a village in Isin Rural District, in the Central District of Bandar Abbas County, Hormozgan Province, Iran. At the 2006 census, its population was 248, in 55 families.
