= Qadamgah-e Emam Reza =

Qadamgah-e Emam Reza (Persian: قدمگاه امام رضا) may refer to:

- Qadamgah-e Emam Reza, Hormozgan
- Qadamgah-e Emam Reza, Khuzestan
