= Mahalleh-ye Now =

Village in Hormozgan province, Iran

Mahalleh-ye Now Persian: محله نو
- Village
- Location within Iran
- Coordinates: 27°19′14″N 56°15′36″E
- Country: Iran
- Province: Hormozgan
- County: Bandar Abbas
- District: Central
- Rural District: Isin

Population (2016)
  - Total: 2,258
- Time zone: UTC+3:30 (IRST)

Mahalleh-ye Now (Persian: محله نو) (Note: Also romanized as Maḩalleh-ye Now) is a village in, and the capital of, Isin Rural District of the Central District of Bandar Abbas County, Hormozgan province, Iran.

== Demographics ==
=== Population ===
At the time of the 2006 National Census, the village's population was 1,932 in 441 households. The following census in 2011 counted 1,996 people in 516 households. The 2016 census measured the population of the village as 2,258 people in 663 households.
