= Bolandu =

Bolandu or Bolandoo (Persian: بلندو) may refer to:

- Bolandu, Fars
- Bolandu, Hormozgan
