= Mashkar, Hormozgan =

Mashkar ماشكار
- Village
- Location within Iran
- Coordinates: 27°42′48″N 56°31′25″E
- Country: Iran
- Province: Hormozgan
- County: Bandar Abbas
- Bakhsh: Central
- Rural District: Isin

Population (2006)
  - Total: 145
- Time zone: UTC+3:30 (IRST)
  - Summer (DST): UTC+4:30 (IRDT)

Mashkar (Persian: ماشكار, also Romanized as Māshkār; also known as Māshārī) is a village in Isin Rural District, in the Central District of Bandar Abbas County, Hormozgan Province, Iran. At the 2006 census, its population was 145, in 43 families.
