= Shahrow, Isin =

Shahrow شهرو
- Village
- Interactive map of Shahrow
- Country: Iran
- Province: Hormozgan
- County: Bandar Abbas
- Bakhsh: Central
- Rural District: Isin

Population (2006)
  - Total: 208
- Time zone: UTC+3:30 (IRST)
  - Summer (DST): UTC+4:30 (IRDT)

Shahrow (Persian: شهرو, also Romanized as Shahrū) is a village in Isin Rural District, in the Central District of Bandar Abbas County, Hormozgan Province, Iran. At the 2006 census, its population was 208, in 76 families.
