= Sar Rig-e Dum =

Sar Rig-e Dum سرريگ دوم
- Village
- Location within Iran
- Coordinates: 27°18′08″N 56°16′12″E
- Country: Iran
- Province: Hormozgan
- County: Bandar Abbas
- Bakhsh: Central
- Rural District: Isin

Population (2006)
  - Total: 296
- Time zone: UTC+3:30 (IRST)
  - Summer (DST): UTC+4:30 (IRDT)

Sar Rig-e Dum (Persian: سرريگ دوم, also Romanized as Sar Rīg-e Dūm; also known as Sar Rīg-e Do and Sarrīk-e Karbalā’ī Fāţemeh) is a village in Isin Rural District, in the Central District of Bandar Abbas County, Hormozgan Province, Iran. At the 2006 census, its population was 296, in 61 families.
