= Bolandu, Hormozgan =

Bolandu بلندو
- Village
- Location within Iran
- Coordinates: 27°12′27″N 55°59′09″E
- Country: Iran
- Province: Hormozgan
- County: Bandar Abbas
- Bakhsh: Central
- Rural District: Tazian

Population (2006)
  - Total: 1,008
- Time zone: UTC+3:30 (IRST)
  - Summer (DST): UTC+4:30 (IRDT)

Bolandu (Persian: بلندو, also Romanized as Bolandū and Bolandoo; also known as Bilandu) is a village in Tazian Rural District, in the Central District of Bandar Abbas County, Hormozgan Province, Iran. At the 2006 census, its population was 1,008, in 214 families.
