= Chah-e Chekor =

Village in Hormozgan province, Iran

Chah-e Chekor Persian: چه چكر
- Village
- Location within Iran
- Coordinates: 27°16′35″N 56°20′50″E
- Country: Iran
- Province: Hormozgan
- County: Bandar Abbas
- District: Central
- Rural District: Isin

Population (2016)
  - Total: 3,241
- Time zone: UTC+3:30 (IRST)

Chah-e Chekor (Persian: چه چكر) (Note: Also known as Chahchekor and Cheychagar) is a village in Isin Rural District of the Central District of Bandar Abbas County, Hormozgan province, Iran.

== Demographics ==
=== Population ===
At the time of the 2006 National Census, the village's population was 1,681 in 432 households. The following census in 2011 counted 2,849 people in 472 households. The 2016 census measured the population of the village as 3,241 people in 856 households. It was the most populous village in its rural district.
