= Qadamgah-e Emam Reza, Hormozgan =

Qadamgah-e Emam Reza قدمگاه امام رضا
- Village
- Location within Iran
- Coordinates: 27°19′38″N 56°07′04″E
- Country: Iran
- Province: Hormozgan
- County: Bandar Abbas
- Bakhsh: Central
- Rural District: Tazian

Population (2006)
  - Total: 32
- Time zone: UTC+3:30 (IRST)
  - Summer (DST): UTC+4:30 (IRDT)

Qadamgah-e Emam Reza (Persian: قدمگاه امام رضا, also Romanized as Qadamgāh-e Emām Reẕā) is a village in Tazian Rural District, in the Central District of Bandar Abbas County, Hormozgan Province, Iran. At the 2006 census, its population was 32, with 7 families.
