= Sarkhun, Hormozgan =

Village in Hormozgan province, Iran

Sarkhun Persian: سرخون
- Village
- Location within Iran
- Coordinates: 27°23′23″N 56°23′43″E
- Country: Iran
- Province: Hormozgan
- County: Bandar Abbas
- District: Central
- Rural District: Sarkhun

Population (2016)
  - Total: 5,314
- Time zone: UTC+3:30 (IRST)

Sarkhun (Persian: سرخون) (Note: Also romanized as Sarkhūn; also known as Sarkhoom and Shahru) is a village in, and the capital of, Sarkhun Rural District of the Central District of Bandar Abbas County, Hormozgan province, Iran.

== Demographics ==
=== Population ===
At the time of the 2006 National Census, the village's population was 3,870 in 896 households, when it was in Qaleh Qazi District. The following census in 2011 counted 4,528 people in 1,238 households, by which time the rural district had been transferred to the Central District. The 2016 census measured the population of the village as 5,314 people in 1,545 households. It was the most populous village in its rural district.
