= Demshar-e Khurgu =

Demshar-e Khurgu ديمشهرخورگو
- Village
- Location within Iran
- Coordinates: 27°33′17″N 56°26′46″E
- Country: Iran
- Province: Hormozgan
- County: Bandar Abbas
- Bakhsh: Central
- Rural District: Isin

Population (2006)
  - Total: 31
- Time zone: UTC+3:30 (IRST)
  - Summer (DST): UTC+4:30 (IRDT)

Demshar-e Khurgu (Persian: ديمشهرخورگو, also Romanized as Demshar-e Khūrgū; also known as Dar-e Shahrū, Dar Shīrū, Khorgū, Khowrgū, Khurgu, Khvorgū, Shahroo, and Shahrū) is a village in Isin Rural District, in the Central District of Bandar Abbas County, Hormozgan Province, Iran. At the 2006 census, its population was 31, in 9 families.
