= Green Salt Project =

Alleged secret Iranian nuclear project

The Green Salt Project (also known as the "Project 1-11") is an alleged secretive Iranian entity focusing on uranium processing, high explosives and a missile warhead design. The Green Salt Project derives its name from uranium tetrafluoride, also known as green salt, an intermediate product in the conversion of uranium ore into uranium hexafluoride — a toxic gas that can undergo enrichment or purification into fuel for nuclear reactors or bombs.

Uranium tetrafluoride has also been used as the source of metallic uranium for Magnox reactor fuel elements via chemical reduction. Since the International Atomic Energy Agency began investigating Iranian nuclear activities in 2002, the IAEA has discovered a series of clandestine nuclear activities, some of which violated Iran's safeguards agreement with the agency. The Green Salt Project is allegedly among these projects.

== Publicity ==
The Green Salt Project was initially brought to light by reports of a laptop computer in the CIA's possession which was supposedly smuggled out of Iran that contained a variety of information on Iran's alleged nuclear weapons program, from the design of underground testing facilities to schematics of nuclear missile warheads. In January 2006, the International Atomic Energy Agency (IAEA) first referred to the green salt project.

== IAEA request ==
In December 2005, the IAEA Secretariat had repeated its request for a meeting to discuss information that had been made available to the Secretariat about alleged nuclear research studies, including the Green Salt Project, as well as tests related to high explosives and the design of a missile re-entry vehicle, all of which could involve nuclear material and which appear to have administrative interconnections.

== Iran's reply ==
In December 2005, Iran replied that the "issues related to baseless allegations." On 23 January 2006, Iran agreed to a meeting with the Deputy Director-General for Safeguards for clarification of the alleged Green Salt Project, but declined to address the other topics during that meeting.

In the meeting, which took place on 27 January 2006, the Agency presented for Iran's review a number of communications related to the project. Iran reiterated that all national nuclear projects are conducted by the Atomic Energy Organization of Iran (AEOI), that the allegations were baseless and that it would provide further clarifications later.

== Meeting in 2006 ==
In February 2006, the IAEA Deputy Director-General for Safeguards met with Iranian authorities to discuss the alleged Green Salt Project. Iran repeated that the allegations "are based on false and fabricated documents so they were baseless", and that neither such a project nor such studies exist or did exist.

== Resolution ==
In November 2008, Gholam Reza Aghazadeh, head of Atomic Energy Organization of Iran, announced that Iran received a letter from the IAEA, which declares irrelevancy of this project to nuclear missile warheads and the issue has completely resolved.

== See also ==
- Nuclear program of Iran
- Nuclear Non-Proliferation Treaty
- Iran and weapons of mass destruction
- Atomic Energy Organization of Iran
