= Missile Shower System =

- Type: Ballistic missile launcher
- Place of origin: Iran

Service history
- In service: Since 2020
- Used by: Islamic Republic of Iran

Production history
- Designer: Iran (IRGC)
- Designed: 4 November 2020 (unveiling)
- Manufacturer: IRGCAF
- Produced: Since 2020

The Missile Shower System (Persian: سامانه تیربار موشکی) is an automated, rail-mounted multiple ballistic missile launcher designed to enable a rapid barrage of medium range ballistic missiles (MRBMs) to be launched from Iran's underground missile silos. Each system has the ability to carry and fire five Emad precision-guided missiles with a range of 1700 km and maneuverable warheads as shown in the unveiling-ceremony. The system has been built by the Aerospace Force of the Islamic Revolutionary Guard Corps (IRGC), and was unveiled on November 4, 2020.]

== Overview ==
Each system consists of a rail mounted wagon with the ability to vertically carry five missiles, the vertically stowed missile "magazine" then brings the groups of missiles into their launch positions for rapid, consecutive launching from the underground silo. This system is the first of its kind, and has no parallels anywhere else in the world in the missile arsenals of other countries.

The Shower System offers several advantages compared to the conventional method of launching a single missile from a single silo at a time:

1. In a total war scenario, especially fighting an enemy with air superiority (e.g. the U.S.), when underground silos can only launch missiles one at a time, they can only launch a few missiles before being detected and hit by a counter strike. The missile magazine system allows Iran to launch significantly more missiles before any likely retaliation.
2. It allows Iran to overwhelm enemy anti-ballistic missile defense systems with a rapid barrage of a large number of medium-range ballistic missiles.
3. Since the missiles on their individual platforms are ready to fire, there is no need to reload individual launchers using a crane or trans-loader, thus storing the missiles more efficiently and taking up less space at the site.

A missile magazine-type base has been discovered to be under construction near Khorgo, Hormozgan province.

== Unveiling ==
The Iranian "Missile Shower System" has been unveiled on 4 November 2020 by the Islamic Revolutionary Guard Corps Commander Major General Hossein Salami. Salami said at the mentioned unveiling ceremony: "Our missile power guarantees the withdrawal of enemies (from the region)." He also added: our deterrent and defense capabilities provide Iran with great power which supports the country in demonstrating its political will and imposing it on the enemy if necessary.

== See also ==
- List of military equipment manufactured in Iran
- Amir Ali Hajizadeh
- Hassan Tehrani Moghaddam
