= Qadamgah-e Bi Bi Shahr Banu =

Qadamgah-e Bi Bi Shahr Banu قدمگاه بي بي شهربانو
- Village
- Country: Iran
- Province: Hormozgan
- County: Bandar Abbas
- Bakhsh: Qaleh Qazi
- Rural District: Sarkhun

Population (2006)
  - Total: 51
- Time zone: UTC+3:30 (IRST)
  - Summer (DST): UTC+4:30 (IRDT)

Qadamgah-e Bi Bi Shahr Banu (Persian: قدمگاه بي بي شهربانو, also Romanized as Qadamgāh-e Bī Bī Shahr Bānū) is a village in Sarkhun Rural District, Qaleh Qazi District, Bandar Abbas County, Hormozgan Province, Iran. At the 2006 census, its population was 51, in 12 families.
