= Sar Rig, Qeshm =

Sar Rig سرريگ
- Village
- Location within Iran
- Coordinates: 26°41′00″N 55°28′02″E
- Country: Iran
- Province: Hormozgan
- County: Qeshm
- Bakhsh: Shahab
- Rural District: Dulab

Population (2006)
  - Total: 1,498
- Time zone: UTC+3:30 (IRST)
  - Summer (DST): UTC+4:30 (IRDT)

Sar Rig (Persian: سرريگ, also Romanized as Sar Rīg, Sarīg, and Sarrīg) is a village in Dulab Rural District, Shahab District, Qeshm County, Hormozgan Province, Iran. At the 2006 census, its population was 1,498, in 329 families.
