= Sar Rig, Kerman =

Sar Rig سرريگ
- Village
- Location within Iran
- Coordinates: 27°54′18″N 57°37′44″E
- Country: Iran
- Province: Kerman
- County: Kahnuj
- Bakhsh: Central
- Rural District: Nakhlestan

Population (2006)
  - Total: 787
- Time zone: UTC+3:30 (IRST)
  - Summer (DST): UTC+4:30 (IRDT)

Sar Rig (Persian: سرريگ, also Romanized as Sar Rīg) is a village in Nakhlestan Rural District, in the Central District of Kahnuj County, Kerman Province, Iran. At the 2006 census, its population was 787, in 172 families.
