= Qadamgah-e Emam Reza, Khuzestan =

Qadamgah-e Emam Reza قدمگاه امام رضا
- Village
- Country: Iran
- Province: Khuzestan
- County: Behbahan
- Bakhsh: Central
- Rural District: Howmeh

Population (2006)
  - Total: 61
- Time zone: UTC+3:30 (IRST)
  - Summer (DST): UTC+4:30 (IRDT)

Qadamgah-e Emam Reza (Persian: قدمگاه امام رضا, also Romanized as Qadamgāh-e Emām Rez̤ā) is a village in Howmeh Rural District, in the Central District of Behbahan County, Khuzestan Province, Iran. At the 2006 census, its population was 61, in 14 families.
