= Gawdat Bahgat =

American political scientist

- Born: 1960 (age 65–66); Cairo, Egypt
- Citizenship: United States
- Education: Cairo University (B.A. Political Science, 1977); American University in Cairo (M.A. Middle Eastern Studies, 1985); Florida State University (Ph.D. Political Science, 1991)
- Scientific career
- Fields: Petroleum politics, energy security, terrorism, fundamentalism, nuclear proliferation, American foreign policy, Middle East, Caspian Sea
- Workplaces: Florida State University (1991–92); University of North Florida (1992–95); Indiana University of Pennsylvania (1995–2009); National Defense University (2010–)

Gawdat Bahgat (born c. 1960s) is an Egyptian-American professor of political science at the National Defense University. Bahgat was born and raised in Cairo, Egypt and earned degrees at Cairo University and American University in Cairo. He emigrated to the United States and earned his Ph.D at Florida State University in Tallahassee, Florida in 1991.

== Career ==
Bahgat served as a professor of political science at Indiana University of Pennsylvania from 1995 to 2009 where he also was the Director of the Center for Middle Eastern Studies. In 2006–07 he earned the Distinguished Faculty Award for research.

Bahgat has published several books, chapters, and articles on various subjects including oil politics, nuclear proliferation and the Persian Gulf and Caspian Sea regions. His works have been translated into several foreign languages.

In 2010, Bahgat began teaching at the National Defense University in Washington, D.C.

== Works ==
=== Books ===
- The Gulf Monarchies: New Economic and Political Realities, 1997
- The Future of the Gulf, 1997
- The Persian Gulf at the Dawn of the New Millennium, 1999
- American Oil Diplomacy in the Persian Gulf and the Caspian Sea, 2003
- Israel and the Persian Gulf: Retrospect and Prospect, 2006
- Proliferation of Nuclear Weapons in the Middle East, 2007
- Sovereign Wealth Funds in Non-OECD Countries, 2010

=== Chapters ===
- "Oil Security in the New Millennium: Geo-Economy vs. Geo-Strategy" Year Book for International Security Policy, 2000, (in German)
- "Privatization and Democratization in the Arab World: Is There a Connection?" in Privatization and Public Policy, 2000
- "The Caspian Sea Geo-political Game: The United States Versus Iran" and "Israel and Iran: Prospects for Détente," in Oil and Water: Cooperative Security in the Persian Gulf, 2001
- "Western Strategic Cooperation with Russia Concerning Oil Supply" in Year Book for International Security Policy, 2003 (in English and German)
- "United States Oil Diplomacy in the Persian Gulf" in Pax Americana in the Middle East: The United States’ Policy towards the Regional Order of the Persian Gulf, 2005
- "Energy Security: Asia and the Middle East" in European Union-Gulf Relations, 2006
- "Energy Security in Central Asia" in Conflict and Conflict Resolution in Central Eurasia: Dimensions and Challenges, 2006
- "Libya Looks to a Bright Future Post-Sanctions" in Mediterranean Yearbook, 2006, (in English, French, and Spanish)
- "Geopolitics and Security: The American Point of View," in Encyclopaedia of Hydrocarbons (in English and Italian)
