= Qadamgah-e Hazrat-e Ali =

Qadamgah-e Hazrat-e Ali قدمگاه حضرت علي
- Village
- Location within Iran
- Coordinates: 26°39′31″N 57°42′03″E
- Country: Iran
- Province: Hormozgan
- County: Minab
- Bakhsh: Senderk
- Rural District: Dar Pahn

Population (2006)
  - Total: 23
- Time zone: UTC+3:30 (IRST)
  - Summer (DST): UTC+4:30 (IRDT)

Qadamgah-e Hazrat-e Ali (Persian: قدمگاه حضرت علي, also Romanized as Qadamgāh-e Ḩaẕrat-e ‘Alī) is a village in Dar Pahn Rural District, Senderk District, Minab County, Hormozgan Province, Iran. At the 2006 census, its population was 23, in 5 families.
