= Tazian-e Pain =

City in Hormozgan province, Iran

Tazian-e Pain Persian: تازيان پايين
- City
- Location within Iran
- Coordinates: 27°17′27″N 56°09′23″E
- Country: Iran
- Province: Hormozgan
- County: Bandar Abbas
- District: Central

Population (2016)
  - Total: 4,263
- Time zone: UTC+3:30 (IRST)

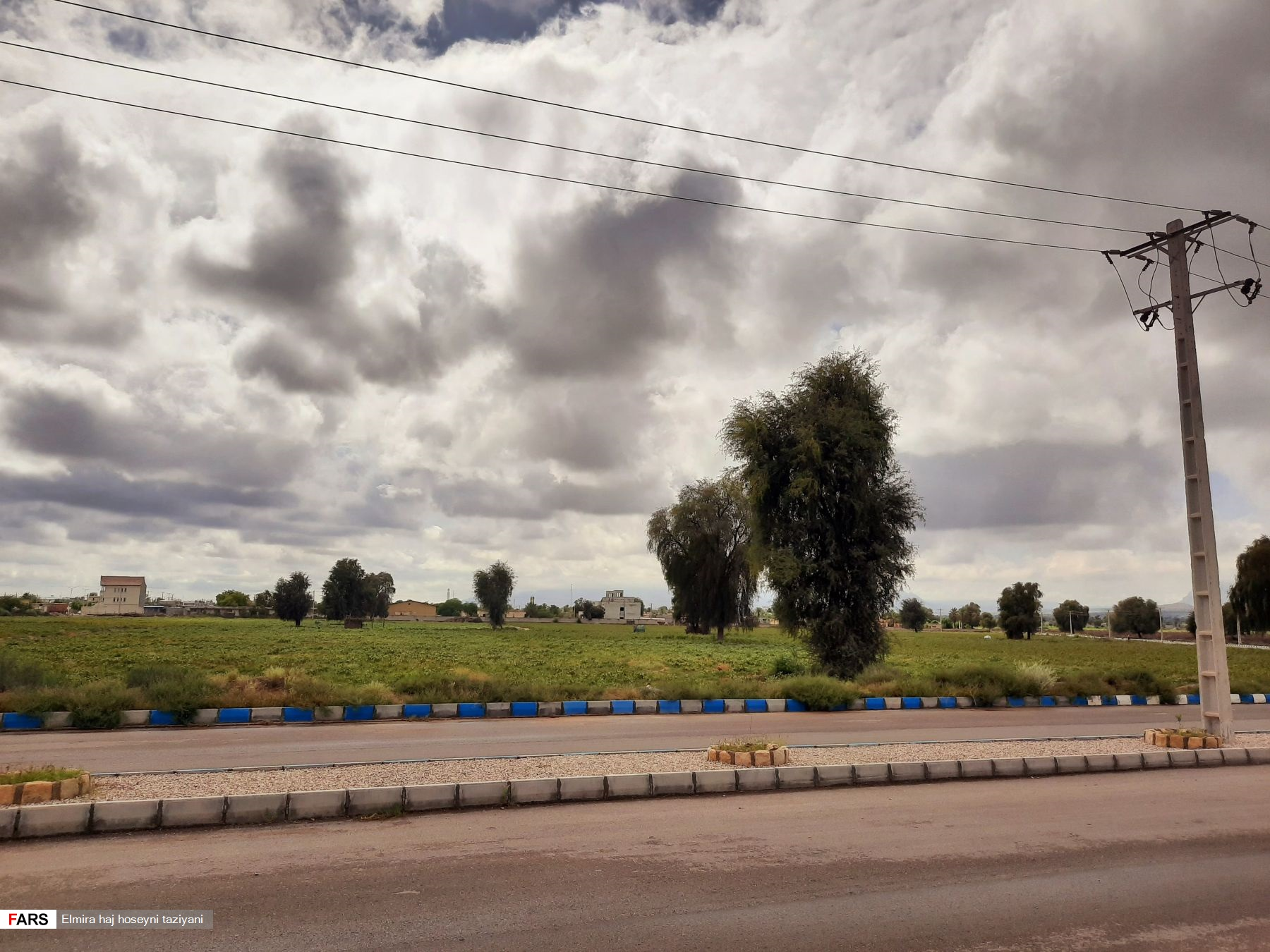
Tazian-e Pain

Tazian-e Pain (Persian: تازيان پايين) (Note: Also romanized as Tāzīān-e Pā’īn; also known as Pārsīān, Tāzeyān, Tazeyān-e Zīr, Tāzīān, Tāzīān-e Zīr, and Tazīyan) is a city in the Central District of Bandar Abbas County, Hormozgan province, Iran, serving as the administrative center for Tazian Rural District.

== Demographics ==
=== Population ===
At the time of the 2006 National Census, Tazian-e Pain's population was 5,695 in 1,446 households, when it was a village in Tazian Rural District. The following census in 2011 counted 6,571 people in 1,853 households. The 2016 census measured the population as 4,263 people in 1,206 households, by which time the city had been elevated to the status of a city.
