= Mashkar, Khuzestan =

Mashkar ماشكار
- Village
- Location within Iran
- Coordinates: 32°40′41″N 48°39′55″E
- Country: Iran
- Province: Khuzestan
- County: Dezful
- Bakhsh: Sardasht
- Rural District: Shahi

Population (2006)
  - Total: 94
- Time zone: UTC+3:30 (IRST)
  - Summer (DST): UTC+4:30 (IRDT)

Mashkar (Persian: ماشكار, also Romanized as Māshkār) is a village in Shahi Rural District, Sardasht District, Dezful County, Khuzestan Province, Iran. At the 2006 census, its population was 94, in 15 families.
