= Sar Rig, Bandar Abbas =

Sar Rig سرريگ
- Village
- Location within Iran
- Coordinates: 27°29′36″N 56°50′19″E
- Country: Iran
- Province: Hormozgan
- County: Bandar Abbas
- Bakhsh: Takht
- Rural District: Shamil

Population (2006)
  - Total: 86
- Time zone: UTC+3:30 (IRST)
  - Summer (DST): UTC+4:30 (IRDT)

Sar Rig (Persian: سرريگ, also Romanized as Sar Rīg; also known as Sarrīg) is a village in Shamil Rural District, Takht District, Bandar Abbas County, Hormozgan Province, Iran. At the 2006 census, its population was 86, in 18 families.
