= Shahrud, Lorestan =

Shahrud شاهرود
- Village
- Location within Iran
- Coordinates: 33°05′04″N 49°11′19″E
- Country: Iran
- Province: Lorestan
- County: Aligudarz
- Bakhsh: Zaz and Mahru
- Rural District: Zaz-e Sharqi

Population (2006)
  - Total: 102
- Time zone: UTC+3:30 (IRST)
  - Summer (DST): UTC+4:30 (IRDT)

Shahrud (Persian: شاهرود, also Romanized as Shāhrūd; also known as Shāhrū) is a village in Zaz-e Sharqi Rural District, Zaz and Mahru District, Aligudarz County, Lorestan Province, Iran.In the 2006 census, its population was 102, in 16 families.
