= Sarkhun Rural District =

Rural district in Hormozgan province, Iran

Sarkhun Rural District Persian: دهستان سرخون
- Rural District
- Location within Iran
- Coordinates: 27°23′10″N 56°25′20″E
- Country: Iran
- Province: Hormozgan
- County: Bandar Abbas
- District: Central
- Capital: Sarkhun

Population (2016)
  - Total: 7,548
- Time zone: UTC+3:30 (IRST)

Sarkhun Rural District (Persian: دهستان سرخون) is in the Central District of Bandar Abbas County, Hormozgan province, Iran. Its capital is the village of Sarkhun.

== Demographics ==
=== Population ===
At the time of the 2006 National Census, the rural district's population (as a part of Qaleh Qazi District) was 5,184 in 1,197 households. There were 6,287 inhabitants in 1,756 households at the following census of 2011, by which time the rural district had been transferred to the Central District. The 2016 census measured the population of the rural district as 7,548 in 2,188 households. The most populous of its nine villages was Sarkhun, with 5,314 people.
