= Qadamgah, Marvdasht =

Qadamgah قدمگاه
- Village
- Location within Iran
- Coordinates: 30°15′31″N 52°25′22″E
- Country: Iran
- Province: Fars
- County: Marvdasht
- Bakhsh: Dorudzan
- Rural District: Dorudzan

Population (2006)
  - Total: 87
- Time zone: UTC+3:30 (IRST)
  - Summer (DST): UTC+4:30 (IRDT)

Qadamgah (Persian: قدمگاه, also Romanized as Qadamgāh) is a village in Dorudzan Rural District, Dorudzan District, Marvdasht County, Fars province, Iran. At the 2006 census, its population was 87, in 17 families.
