= Sarrigan =

Sarrigan سرريگان
- Village
- Location within Iran
- Coordinates: 27°07′28″N 56°54′11″E
- Country: Iran
- Province: Hormozgan
- County: Minab
- Bakhsh: Central
- Rural District: Howmeh

Population (2006)
  - Total: 605
- Time zone: UTC+3:30 (IRST)
  - Summer (DST): UTC+4:30 (IRDT)

Sarrigan (Persian: سرريگان, also Romanized as Sarrīgān and Sar Rīgān; also known as Sar Rīg) is a village in Howmeh Rural District, in the Central District of Minab County, Hormozgan Province, Iran. At the 2006 census, its population was 605, in 119 families.
