= Emad (missile) =

Emad-1
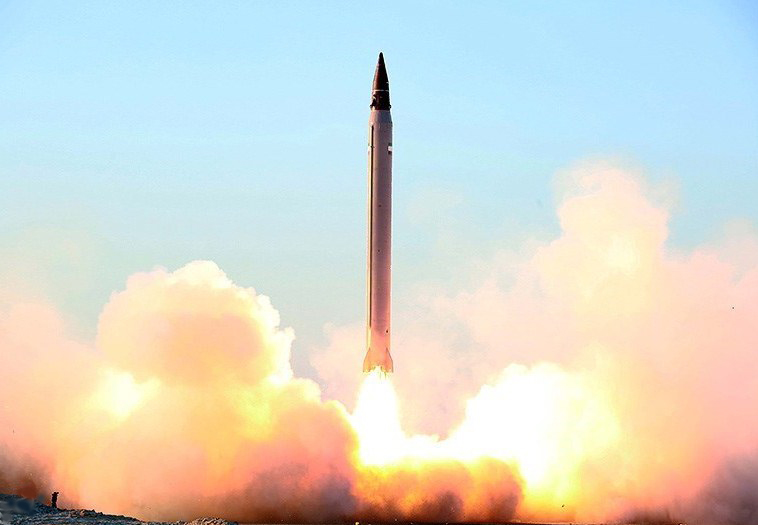
- Type: Medium Range Ballistic Missile
- Place of origin: Iran

Service history
- In service: 2015–present
- Used by: IRGCASF
- Wars: 2026 Iran war

Specifications
- Diameter: 1.25 meters
- Warhead: 1
- Propellant: liquid fuel
- Operational range: 1700 km
- Accuracy: 500 meter CEP

Emad (Persian: عماد, lit. 'pillar') is an Iranian liquid-fuel medium-range ballistic missile (MRBM), a derivative of the Shahab-3.

As of 2026, the Emad is one of Iran's three longest-range missiles, along with the Shahab-3 and Seijil missiles. Emad missiles have been used by Iran in their April and October 2024 attacks on Israel, in the Twelve-Day War, and in the 2026 Iran war.

== Description ==
The Emad can carry a 750 kg payload 1,700 km. The target accuracy is stated at 50m CEP by Iranian sources, but estimated at 500m by international observers. It uses a new nose cone design, which is different from that of the original Shahab-3. The changed design may make it possible for the warhead to detonate high above a target, which makes it more suitable for an air burst chemical, biological or nuclear weapon detonation, as well as for nuclear electromagnetic pulse attack.

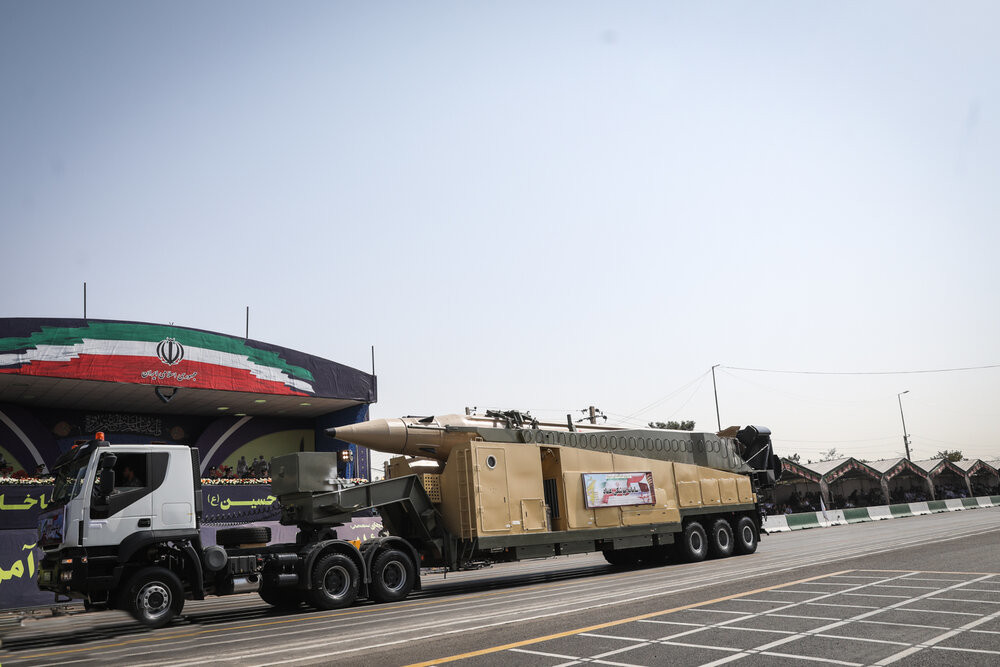
An Emad missile on a launcher at a parade in Tehran, 2019

Emad missiles are notably liquid-fueled; an American think tank described the fuel for Emad missiles as "extremely volatile and challenging to transport." The Emad features a newly designed reentry vehicle with a more advanced guidance and control system, making it Iran's first precision-guided MRBM. The missile features a maneuverable reentry vehicle (MARV). The missile has an advanced guidance and control system in its nose cone, and it is said to have an accuracy of about 500 meters. The missile, which appears to be another variant of the Shahab-3, was expected to be delivered to the armed forces some time in 2016.

In 2024, the liquid-fuelled Emad was described as "somewhat older" compared to Iran's safer solid-fueled missiles.

On 18 October 2025, the IRGC-ASF announced that they had added a precision-guidance kit to the Emad missile.

== Operational history ==
The missile was presented by Brigadier General Hossein Dehghan on 11 October 2015.

On 13 April 2024 Iran launched Emad ballistic missiles at Israel. The James Martin Center for Nonproliferation Studies studied the attack in a report and found that the Emad missiles used had a CEP of ~1.2 km, significantly worse than earlier international estimates.

In October 2024 Emad missiles were used alongside other ballistic missiles in Iran's attack on Israel. IRGC-affiliated sources said that in this attack Emad and Ghadr missiles were used to saturate Israeli ballistic missile defense and soak up interceptors, allowing more modern solid-fueled missiles to get through.

Emad missiles were also used in June 2025 as part of the Twelve-Day War.

Emad missiles were reportedly part of the immediate Iranian response to the 2026 Iran War, being fired on the war's first day. Emad missiles were also used as part of a wave of ballistic missiles on Israel between March 17 2026 and March 18 2026.

== See also ==
- Military of Iran
- Iranian military industry
- List of military equipment manufactured in Iran
- Islamic Revolutionary Guard Corps Aerospace Force
- Ballistic missile program of Iran
- Ghadr-110
- Iranian underground missile bases
- Missile Magazine System
- Equipment of the Iranian Army
- Science and technology in Iran
