= Qadamgah, South Khorasan =

Qadamgah قدمگاه
- Village
- Location within Iran
- Coordinates: 31°40′29″N 59°55′12″E
- Country: Iran
- Province: South Khorasan
- County: Nehbandan
- Bakhsh: Central
- Rural District: Neh

Population (2006)
  - Total: 217
- Time zone: UTC+3:30 (IRST)
  - Summer (DST): UTC+4:30 (IRDT)

Qadamgah (Persian: قدمگاه, also Romanized as Qadamgāh; also known as Hameh Hīng) is a village in Neh Rural District, in the Central District of Nehbandan County, South Khorasan Province, Iran. At the 2006 census, its population was 217, in 69 families.
