= Ghadr-110 =

Medium-range ballistic missile

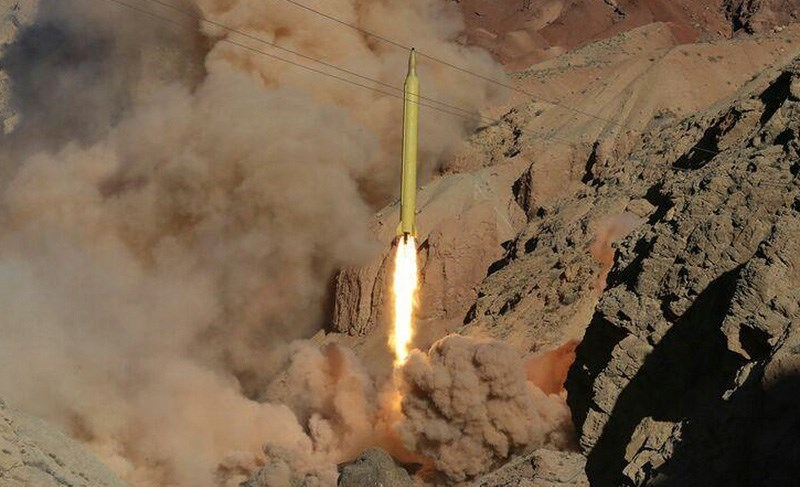
- A Ghadr ballistic missile launch, March 2016
- Type: MRBM
- Place of origin: Iran

Service history
- Used by: Iran

Production history
- Manufacturer: Iran

Specifications
- Warhead: One
- Engine: First stage liquid, Second stage solid
- Operational range: 1,800–2,000 km
- Guidance system: Inertial guidance, Global Positioning System
- Accuracy: CEP: 30-50m

The Ghadr-110 or Qadr-110, (Persian: قدر-110, meaning "intensity") is a medium-range ballistic missile designed and developed by Iran as part of its missile program. The missile has a range of 1,800 km to 2,000 km. The Iranian Armed Forces first displayed the missile to the public at an annual military parade to mark the Iran–Iraq War.

The Ghadr-110 is an improved version of the Shahab-3A, also known as the Ghadr-101. It is believed to have a liquid-fuel first stage and a solid-fuel second stage, which allows it to have a range of 1,500 km (930 mi). It is suggested that the Ghadr-101 and Ghadr-110 will provide Iran ASAT and IRBM capability.

The Qadr missile was unveiled for the first time in an annual parade on the occasion of the anniversary of the start of the Iran-Iraq war. This missile is produced in three types: "Qadr S" with a range of 1,350 km, "Qadr H" with a range of 1,650 km and "Qadr F" with a range of 1,950 km. The Qadr-110 series of missiles carry a warhead weighing from 650 kg to 1000 kg which the Qadr F carries. It also has a length of 15.5 to 16.58 meters with an overall weight of 15 to 17.48 tons, where the base model is two tons heavier compared to the Shahab-3.

The Ghadr-110 has a higher maneuverability and a shorter set-up time than the Shahab-3; its set-up time is 30 minutes while the older Shahab-3 has a set-up time of several hours. The missile has been manufactured entirely in Iran at the top-secret Hemmat Missile Industries Complex.

In November 2015 and January 2017, Iran reportedly carried out launches of the Ghadr-110. The United States viewed this as a violation of United Nations Security Council Resolution 2231 which "calls upon" Iran to not work on any ballistic missiles capable of carrying nuclear warheads, including launching them. Russia's ambassador to the UN disputed this, saying "a call is different from a ban, so legally you cannot violate a call, you can comply with a call or you can ignore the call, but you cannot violate a call".

Iran's foreign minister, Javad Zarif, responded by saying that since Iran does not possess nuclear weapons nor does it ever intend to have them, it does not design its missiles to be capable of carrying nuclear warheads, a statement which was questioned in light of the apparent Iranian nuclear archive discovery. However, Senior Fellow for Missile Defence at the IISS Michael Elleman noted that the bomb design presented by Benjamin Netanyahu would fit in Iran's pre-2004 Nodong/Shahab-3 nosecone, but not any of the post-2004 missiles, including Ghadr-110 missile.

On November 6, 2023, a Ghadr-110 missile was launched from Yemen by the Houthis towards Israel, which was intercepted by the Arrow-3 system while it was still outside of Earth's atmosphere, in what was described as the first instance of combat in space in human history.

On June 23, 2025, Iran announced the use of Qadr-H missile for the first time in the ongoing Iran–Israel war in its 21st wave of missiles against Israel. It also announced the use of Qadr-H missile in combat in the 2026 Iran war.

== Other use ==
There is also an unrelated anti-ship cruise missile called Ghadr-110 by the Iranians (Houthi designation ‘Sejil’).

== Operators ==
- Iran
- Hezbollah
- Houthis

== See also ==
- Military of Iran
- Aerospace Force of the Army of the Guardians of the Islamic Revolution – controls Iran's missile forces
- Iranian military industry
- List of military equipment manufactured in Iran
- Iran's missile forces
- Shahab-3
- Emad (missile)
- Equipment of the Iranian Army
- Science and technology in Iran
