= Tazian Rural District =

Rural district in Hormozgan province, Iran

Tazian Rural District Persian: دهستان تازيان
- Rural District
- Location within Iran
- Coordinates: 27°17′21″N 56°04′13″E
- Country: Iran
- Province: Hormozgan
- County: Bandar Abbas
- District: Central
- Capital: Tazian-e Pain

Population (2016)
  - Total: 21,010
- Time zone: UTC+3:30 (IRST)

Tazian Rural District (Persian: دهستان تازيان) is in the Central District of Bandar Abbas County, Hormozgan province, Iran. It is administered from the city of Tazian-e Pain.

== Demographics ==
=== Population ===
At the time of the 2006 National Census, the rural district's population was 21,371 in 4,803 households. There were 25,550 inhabitants in 6,752 households at the following census of 2011. The 2016 census measured the population of the rural district as 21,010 in 5,956 households. The most populous of its 29 villages was Qalat-e Bala, with 2,223 people.
