= Isin Rural District =

Rural district in Hormozgan Province, Iran

Isin Rural District Persian: دهستان ايسين
- Rural District
- Location within Iran
- Coordinates: 27°26′20″N 56°18′16″E
- Country: Iran
- Province: Hormozgan
- County: Bandar Abbas
- District: Central
- Capital: Mahalleh-ye Now

Population (2016)
  - Total: 27,243
- Time zone: UTC+3:30 (IRST)

Isin Rural District (Persian: دهستان ايسين) is in the Central District of Bandar Abbas County, Hormozgan province, Iran. Its capital is the village of Mahalleh-ye Now.

== Demographics ==
=== Population ===
At the time of the 2006 National Census, the rural district's population was 20,775 in 4,990 households. There were 26,529 inhabitants in 7,142 households at the following census of 2011. The 2016 census measured the population of the rural district as 27,243 in 7,471 households. The most populous of its 69 villages was Chah-e Chekor, with 3,241 people.
