= Central District (Bandar Abbas County) =

District in Hormozgan province, Iran

Central District (Bandar Abbas County) Persian: بخش مرکزی شهرستان بندرعباس
- District
- Location within Iran
- Coordinates: 27°29′00″N 56°13′40″E
- Country: Iran
- Province: Hormozgan
- County: Bandar Abbas
- Capital: Bandar Abbas

Population (2016)
  - Total: 614,599
- Time zone: UTC+3:30 (IRST)

The Central District of Bandar Abbas County (Persian: بخش مرکزی شهرستان بندرعباس) is in Hormozgan province, Iran. Its capital is the city of Bandar Abbas.

== History ==
After the 2006 National Census, Sarkhun Rural District was transferred from Qaleh Qazi District, and Siyahu Rural District from Fin District, to the Central District.

After the 2011 census, the village of Tazian-e Pain was elevated to the status of a city.

== Demographics ==
=== Population ===
At the time of the 2006 census, the district's population was 429,093 in 103,540 households. The following census in 2011 counted 525,042 people in 142,384 households. The 2016 census measured the population of the district as 614,599 inhabitants in 177,420 households.

=== Administrative divisions ===
Central District (Bandar Abbas County) Population
Administrative Divisions	2006	2011	2016
Gachin RD	19,479	20,741	18,960
Isin RD	20,735	26,529	27,243
Sarkhun RD (Note: Transferred from Qaleh Qazi District)		6,287	7,548
Siyahu RD (Note: Transferred from Fin District)		10,184	8,927
Tazian RD	21,371	25,550	21,010
Bandar Abbas (city)	367,508	435,751	526,648
Tazian-e Pain (city)			4,263
Total	429,093	525,042	614,599
RD = Rural District
