= Homa =

Homa may refer to:

== Places ==
=== Ethiopia ===
- Homa (woreda), a district in Oromia Region, Ethiopia

=== Kenya ===
- Homa Bay, a town and a bay on the shore of Lake Victoria in Kenya
- Homa Mountain, a volcano near Homa Bay, Kenya

=== Iran ===
- Chal Homa, Markazi, Iran
- Homa, Iran, a village in Lorestan Province, Iran
- Homa-ye Bala (disambiguation), places in Iran
- Homag (disambiguation), various places in Iran
- Homay, Iran (disambiguation), various places in Iran

=== Israel ===
- Har Homa, East Jerusalem neighborhood, Israel

=== United States ===
- Homa Hills, Wyoming
- La Homa, Texas, U.S.

== People ==
=== Given name ===
- Homa Arjomand (born 1952), Iranian political activist
- Homa Darabi (1940–1994), Iranian pediatrician, academic, and political activist
- Homa Vafaie Farley, Iranian-born potter and ceramist
- Homa Hoodfar, Canadian-Iranian sociocultural anthropologist
- Homa Hosseini (born 1988), Iranian rower
- Homa Katouzian (born 1942), Iranian economist, historian, sociologist and literary critic
- Homa Mirafshar (1937–2026), Iranian-born American poet and songwriter
- Homa Nategh (1934–2016), Iranian historian
- Homa J. Porter (1896–1986), American businessman and political activist
- Homa Rousta (1946–2015), Iranian film and stage actress
- Homa Sarshar (born 1946), Iranian-American author, activist, media personality
- Homa Sayar (born 1947), Iranian poet
- Homa Shaibany (1913–??), Iranian surgeon, first female surgeon in Iran

=== Surname ===
- Ava Homa (born 1981), Iranian Kurdish writer, journalist, and educator
- Bernard Homa (1900–1991), British medical doctor and politician
- Max Homa (born 1990), American professional golfer on the PGA Tour
- Peter Homa, British health service manager

== Musical groups ==
- Stay Homas
- Tex La Homa

== Other uses ==
- Homa (ritual), a religious practice in Hinduism, Buddhism and Jainism, involving making offerings into a consecrated fire
- Homa (genus), an insect genus in the tribe Empoascini
- Homa (mythology), a bird creature of Persian mythology
- Homa language, an extinct Bantu language of South Sudan
- Another spelling for Haoma in Zoroastrianism
- Homeostatic model assessment, a medical formula for quantifying insulin resistance
- Harmonic Oscillator Model of Aromaticity, a method for quantifying aromaticity
- Iran Air's acronym, in Persian-language
- Homa Darabi foundation, founded by Parvin Darabi
- Hochelaga-Maisonneuve, neighborhood of Montreal, Canada colloquially known as "HoMa" in short form
- Staff of Homa (Chinese: 护摩之杖), a polearm weapon in the RPG game Genshin Impact
- Viraja Homa, Hindu fire-sacrifice ceremony

== See also ==
- Haoma, the Avestan-language name of a plant and its divinity
- Huma (disambiguation), which has several different meanings
- Houma (disambiguation), which has several different meanings
- Homam (disambiguation)
