= Agassiz (disambiguation) =

Louis Agassiz (1807–1873) was a Swiss-born American biologist and geologist who is recognized as a scholar of Earth's natural history.

Agassiz may also refer to:

== People ==
Agassiz is a surname of Arpitan origin. Like many Arpitan anthroponyms, the final -z only marks paroxytonic stress and should not be pronounced. Nevertheless, it is often pronounced in French through hypercorrection.

- Other members of the Agassiz family, including:
  - Elizabeth Cabot Agassiz (1822–1907), American educator and naturalist, wife of Louis
  - Alexander Agassiz (1835–1910), American scientist and engineer, son of Louis and Elizabeth
  - Rodolphe L. Agassiz (1871–1933), polo champion, son of Alexander
- Graham Agassiz (born 1990), Canadian mountain biker

== Places ==
=== North America ===
- Lake Agassiz, a prehistoric glacial lake

==== Canada ====
- Agassiz Ice Cap, on Ellesmere Island, Nunavut

==== United States ====
- Agassiz Glacier (Alaska)
- Agassiz Glacier (Montana)
- Agassiz Peak, in Arizona
- Agassiz Rock, former name of The Monoliths, a park in Massachusetts
- Mount Agassiz (California)
- Mount Agassiz (New Hampshire)
- Mount Agassiz (Utah)

=== Elsewhere ===
- Agassiz (crater), on Mars
- Agassiz Glacier (New Zealand)
- Agassiz hill, in Argentina and Chile
- Agassizhorn, in Switzerland

=== Communities ===
- Agassiz, British Columbia, Canada
  - Agassiz station (British Columbia), a railway station
- Agassiz, Cambridge, Massachusetts, U.S.
- Agassiz Township, Lac qui Parle County, Minnesota, U.S.
- Agassiz Wilderness, in Minnesota, US
- Agassiz National Wildlife Refuge in Minnesota, US
- Agassiz (electoral district), in Manitoba, Canada

== Other uses ==
- Agassiz Brewing Company, a Canadian brewery named for the prehistoric lake
- Agassiz School, a historic building in Ottumwa, Iowa, U.S.
- Agassiz Station, now Oak Ridge Observatory, in Massachusetts, U.S.
- Hotel Agassiz, a historic building in Boston, Massachusetts, U.S.
- HMCS Agassiz, a ship of the Royal Canadian Navy
- USS Agassiz, a ship of the United States Navy
- USCGC Agassiz (WSC-126), a ship of the United States Coast Guard

== See also ==
- Agassi, a surname
- Gopherus agassizii, the desert tortoise
- Agassiz's perchlet, a fish
- Anolis agassizi, a lizard
- Agassizia, a genus of sea urchin
- Agassiceras, a Lower Jurassic ammonite
