= Aghasin =

Aghasin (Persian: اغاسين), also rendered as Aqasin, may refer to:

- Aghasin-e Bala, a village in Hormozgan Province, Iran
- Aghasin-e Pain, a village in Hormozgan Province, Iran

== See also ==
- Agassi, a surname
- Agha (disambiguation)
- Aghasi (name), a given name and surname
- Aqasi, a given name and surname
