= Hurmudar =

Hurmudar (Persian: هورمودر), also rendered as Hormudar, may refer to:

- Hurmudar, Isin
- Hurmudar-e Bala
- Hurmudar-e Pain
