= Arengan =

Arengan ارنگان
- Village
- Location within Iran
- Coordinates: 27°37′17″N 56°20′32″E
- Country: Iran
- Province: Hormozgan
- County: Bandar Abbas
- Bakhsh: Fin
- Rural District: Gohreh

Population (2006)
  - Total: 64
- Time zone: UTC+3:30 (IRST)
  - Summer (DST): UTC+4:30 (IRDT)

Arengan (Persian: ارنگان, also Romanized as Ārengān) is a village in Gohreh Rural District, Fin District, Bandar Abbas County, Hormozgan Province, Iran. At the 2006 census, its population was 64, in 13 families.
