= Chah Mahku =

Chah Mahku چاه مهكو
- Village
- Location within Iran
- Coordinates: 27°51′41″N 55°57′15″E
- Country: Iran
- Province: Hormozgan
- County: Bandar Abbas
- Bakhsh: Fin
- Rural District: Gohreh

Population (2006)
  - Total: 113
- Time zone: UTC+3:30 (IRST)
  - Summer (DST): UTC+4:30 (IRDT)

Chah Mahku (Persian: چاه مهكو, also Romanized as Chāh Mahkū) is a village in Gohreh Rural District, Fin District, Bandar Abbas County, Hormozgan Province, Iran. At the 2006 census, its population was 113, in 28 families.
