= Tal-e Gerdu =

Tal-e Gerdu تل گردو
- Village
- Location within Iran
- Coordinates: 27°48′01″N 56°25′04″E
- Country: Iran
- Province: Hormozgan
- County: Bandar Abbas
- Bakhsh: Fin
- Rural District: Siyahu

Population (2006)
  - Total: 338
- Time zone: UTC+3:30 (IRST)
  - Summer (DST): UTC+4:30 (IRDT)

Tal-e Gerdu (Persian: تل گردو, also Romanized as Tal-e Gerdū and Tal Gerdū) is a village in Siyahu Rural District, Fin District, Bandar Abbas County, Hormozgan Province, Iran. At the 2006 census, its population was 338, in 90 families.
