= Datow Naseri =

Datow Naseri دتوناصري
- Village
- Location within Iran
- Coordinates: 27°50′09″N 56°29′11″E
- Country: Iran
- Province: Hormozgan
- County: Bandar Abbas
- Bakhsh: Fin
- Rural District: Siyahu

Population (2006)
  - Total: 43
- Time zone: UTC+3:30 (IRST)
  - Summer (DST): UTC+4:30 (IRDT)

Datow Naseri (Persian: دتوناصري, also Romanized as Datow Nāşerī) is a village in Siyahu Rural District, Fin District, Bandar Abbas County, Hormozgan Province, Iran. At the 2006 census, its population was 43, in 11 families.
