= Gerd-e Siah =

Gerd-e Siah (Persian: گردسياه) may refer to:

- Gerd-e Siah (1)
- Gerd-e Siah (2)
