= Tifakan =

Tifakan طيفكان
- Village
- Location within Iran
- Coordinates: 27°43′31″N 56°27′38″E
- Country: Iran
- Province: Hormozgan
- County: Bandar Abbas
- Bakhsh: Fin
- Rural District: Siyahu

Population (2006)
  - Total: 123
- Time zone: UTC+3:30 (IRST)
  - Summer (DST): UTC+4:30 (IRDT)

Tifakan (Persian: طيفكان, also Romanized as Ţīfakān and Tifkān; also known as Tīfakān-e Pā’īn, Tikakun, Ţīqakān, and Titakun) is a village in Siyahu Rural District, Fin District, Bandar Abbas County, Hormozgan Province, Iran. At the 2006 census, its population was 123, in 35 families.
