= Talsuru =

Talsuru تل سورو
- Village
- Location within Iran
- Coordinates: 27°49′07″N 56°17′33″E
- Country: Iran
- Province: Hormozgan
- County: Bandar Abbas
- Bakhsh: Fin
- Rural District: Siyahu

Population (2006)
  - Total: 272
- Time zone: UTC+3:30 (IRST)
  - Summer (DST): UTC+4:30 (IRDT)

Talsuru (Persian: تل سورو, also Romanized as Talsūrū) is a village in Siyahu Rural District, Fin District, Bandar Abbas County, Hormozgan Province, Iran. At the 2006 census, its population was 272, in 70 families.
