= Hezarta =

Hezarta هزارتا
- Village
- Location within Iran
- Coordinates: 27°49′49″N 56°32′46″E
- Country: Iran
- Province: Hormozgan
- County: Bandar Abbas
- Bakhsh: Fin
- Rural District: Siyahu

Population (2006)
  - Total: 48
- Time zone: UTC+3:30 (IRST)
  - Summer (DST): UTC+4:30 (IRDT)

Hezarta (Persian: هزارتا, also Romanized as Hezārtā; also known as Hezārţāq) is a village in Siyahu Rural District, Fin District, Bandar Abbas County, Hormozgan Province, Iran. At the 2006 census, its population was 48, in 13 families.
