= Homa-ye Bala =

Homa-ye Bala may refer to:

- Homag-e Bala
- Homay-e Olya
- Tutang
