= Danuki =

Danuki دنوكي
- Village
- Location within Iran
- Coordinates: 27°50′07″N 56°30′30″E
- Country: Iran
- Province: Hormozgan
- County: Bandar Abbas
- Bakhsh: Fin
- Rural District: Siyahu

Population (2006)
  - Total: 20
- Time zone: UTC+3:30 (IRST)
  - Summer (DST): UTC+4:30 (IRDT)

Danuki (Persian: دنوكي, also Romanized as Danūkī) is a village in Siyahu Rural District, Fin District, Bandar Abbas County, Hormozgan Province, Iran. At the 2006 census, its population was 20, in 4 families.
