= Daq Finu =

Daq Finu دق فينو
- Village
- Location within Iran
- Coordinates: 27°52′30″N 56°09′53″E
- Country: Iran
- Province: Hormozgan
- County: Bandar Abbas
- Bakhsh: Fin
- Rural District: Siyahu

Population (2006)
  - Total: 374
- Time zone: UTC+3:30 (IRST)
  - Summer (DST): UTC+4:30 (IRDT)

Daq Finu (Persian: دق فينو, also Romanized as Daq Fīnū) is a village in Siyahu Rural District, Fin District, Bandar Abbas County, Hormozgan Province, Iran. At the 2006 census, its population was 374, in 69 families.
