= Zarru Kan =

Zarru Kan زروكان
- Village
- Location within Iran
- Coordinates: 27°49′47″N 56°31′53″E
- Country: Iran
- Province: Hormozgan
- County: Bandar Abbas
- Bakhsh: Fin
- Rural District: Siyahu

Population (2006)
  - Total: 138
- Time zone: UTC+3:30 (IRST)
  - Summer (DST): UTC+4:30 (IRDT)

Zarru Kan (Persian: زروكان, also Romanized as Zarrū Kān) is a village in Siyahu Rural District, Fin District, Bandar Abbas County, Hormozgan Province, Iran. At the 2006 census, its population was 138, in 33 families.
