= Zoratu =

Zoratu or Zorratu or Zartu or Zuratu (Persian: زرتو), also rendered as Zaztoo, may refer to:

- Zoratu Bala
- Zoratu Pain
