= Patkonan-e Bala =

Patkonan-e Bala پتكنان بالا
- Village
- Location within Iran
- Coordinates: 27°43′33″N 56°31′42″E
- Country: Iran
- Province: Hormozgan
- County: Bandar Abbas
- Bakhsh: Fin
- Rural District: Siyahu

Population (2006)
  - Total: 83
- Time zone: UTC+3:30 (IRST)
  - Summer (DST): UTC+4:30 (IRDT)

Patkonan-e Bala (Persian: پتكنان بالا, also Romanized as Patkonān-e Bālā; also known as Napkonān, Patkonān, Patkonow-ye Bālā, and Patkonū-ye Bālā) is a village in Siyahu Rural District, Fin District, Bandar Abbas County, Hormozgan Province, Iran. At the 2006 census, its population was 83, in 25 families.
