= Mount Agassiz =

Mount Agassiz may refer to:

== Canada ==
- Mount Agassiz Ski Resort, in Riding Mountain National Park near McCreary, Manitoba (defunct)

== United States ==
- Mount Agassiz (California) (13,899 ft; 4,236 m), in Fresno and Inyo counties
- Mount Agassiz (New Hampshire) (2,378 ft; 725 m), in the town of Bethlehem in Grafton County
- Mount Agassiz (Utah) (12,433 ft; 3,790 m), in Duchesne and Summit counties

== See also ==
- Agassiz Peak (12,360 ft; 3,770 m), in Coconino County, Arizona
- Agassiz (disambiguation)
