= Do Kuh, Hormozgan =

Do Kuh دوكوه
- Village
- Location within Iran
- Coordinates: 27°47′23″N 56°37′03″E
- Country: Iran
- Province: Hormozgan
- County: Bandar Abbas
- Bakhsh: Fin
- Rural District: Siyahu

Population (2006)
  - Total: 20
- Time zone: UTC+3:30 (IRST)
  - Summer (DST): UTC+4:30 (IRDT)

Do Kuh (Persian: دوكوه, also Romanized as Do Kūh or Dokūh) is a village in Siyahu Rural District, Fin District, Bandar Abbas County, Hormozgan Province, Iran. At the 2006 census, its population was 20, in 7 families.
