= Abmah =

Abmah ابماه
- Village
- Location within Iran
- Coordinates: 27°49′54″N 56°00′18″E
- Country: Iran
- Province: Hormozgan
- County: Bandar Abbas
- Bakhsh: Fin
- Rural District: Gohreh

Population (2006)
  - Total: 149
- Time zone: UTC+3:30 (IRST)
  - Summer (DST): UTC+4:30 (IRDT)

Abmah (Persian: ابماه, also Romanized as Ābmāh; also known as Āb Mār) is a village in Gohreh Rural District, Fin District, Bandar Abbas County, Hormozgan Province, Iran. At the 2006 census, its population was 149, in 31 families.
