= Kuh =

Kuh or KUH may refer to:

== Places ==
- Kuh, Iran, a village in South Khorasan Province, Iran
- Kuh-e Olya, a village in Hormozgan Province, Iran
- Kuh-e Sofla, a village in Hormozgan Province, Iran
- Kushiro Airport, Hokkaidō, Japan, IATA code
- Kuh (mountain), common in Iranian place names; see Special:Allpages/Kuh.
- Kuh, Chitral, Union Council of Chitral District, Pakistan

== People ==
- Brian Kuh, American competitive gamer
- Ephraim Kuh, (1731-1790), German-Jewish author
- Gertrude Kuh (1893–1977), American landscape architect
- Katharine Kuh (1904–1994), American art historian, curator and critic
- Kuh Ledesma (born 1955), Filipino singer

== Other uses ==
- Kuopio University Hospital, a central hospital in Kuopio, Finland
- Kushi language, a language of Nigeria
