= Avin =

Avin (Persian: اوين) may refer to:

- Avin, East Azerbaijan
- Avin-e Olya, Hormozgan Province
- Avin-e Sofla, Hormozgan Province
- Avin International, an oil and gas transportation company based in Greece
- Sigal Avin, American-Israeli writer and director
