= Khvor Khurrast =

Khvor Khurrast خورخورست
- Village
- Location within Iran
- Coordinates: 27°37′31″N 56°00′39″E
- Country: Iran
- Province: Hormozgan
- County: Bandar Abbas
- Bakhsh: Fin
- Rural District: Fin

Population (2006)
  - Total: 19
- Time zone: UTC+3:30 (IRST)
  - Summer (DST): UTC+4:30 (IRDT)

Khvor Khurrast (Persian: خورخورست, also Romanized as Khvor Khūrrāst; also known as Khvor Kharrāst) is a village in Fin Rural District, Fin District, Bandar Abbas County, Hormozgan Province, Iran. At the 2006 census, its population was 19, in 4 families.
