= Natardan =

Natardan ناتردان
- Village
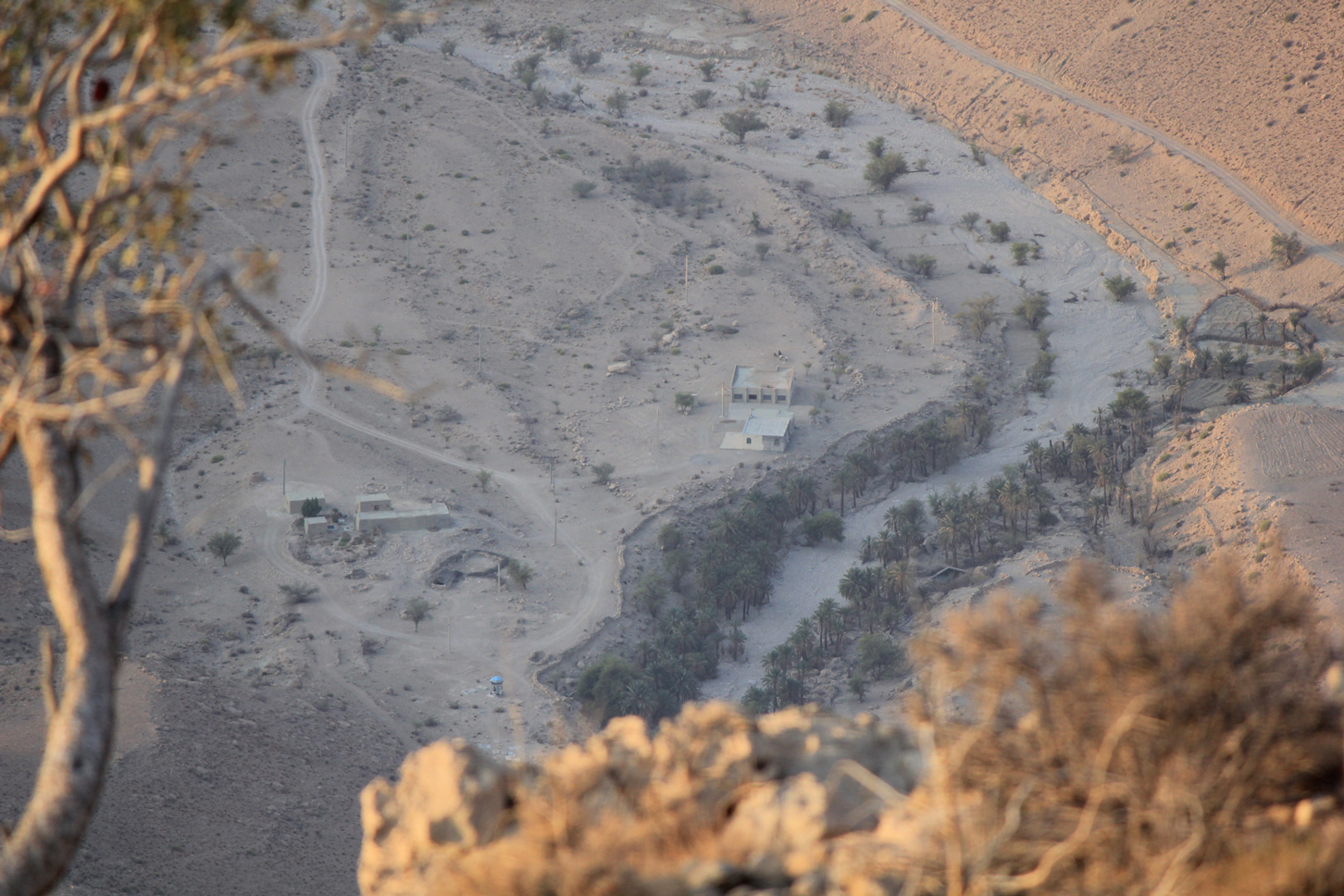
- Natardan

- Location within Iran
- Coordinates: 27°48′49″N 56°03′24″E
- Country: Iran
- Province: Hormozgan
- County: Bandar Abbas
- Bakhsh: Fin
- Rural District: Gohreh

Population (2006)
  - Total: 25
- Time zone: UTC+3:30 (IRST)
  - Summer (DST): UTC+4:30 (IRDT)

Natardan (Persian: ناتردان, also Romanized as Nātardān) is a village in Gohreh Rural District, Fin District, Bandar Abbas County, Hormozgan Province, Iran. At the 2006 census, its population was 25, in 6 families.
