= Khvorjal-e Bala =

Khvorjal-e Bala خورجل بالا
- Village
- Location within Iran
- Coordinates: 27°30′54″N 56°12′15″E
- Country: Iran
- Province: Hormozgan
- County: Bandar Abbas
- Bakhsh: Fin
- Rural District: Fin

Population (2006)
  - Total: 13
- Time zone: UTC+3:30 (IRST)
  - Summer (DST): UTC+4:30 (IRDT)

Khvorjal-e Bala (Persian: خورجل بالا, also Romanized as Khvorjāl-e Bālā) is a village in Fin Rural District, Fin District, Bandar Abbas County, Hormozgan Province, Iran. At the 2006 census, its population was 13, in 4 families.
