= Gohreh =

Gohreh گهره
- Village
- Location within Iran
- Coordinates: 27°44′16″N 56°04′18″E
- Country: Iran
- Province: Hormozgan
- County: Bandar Abbas
- Bakhsh: Fin
- Rural District: Gohreh
- Elevation: 640 m (2,100 ft)

Population (2011)
  - Total: 399
- Time zone: UTC+3:30 (IRST)
  - Summer (DST): UTC+4:30 (IRDT)
- Area code: 0763271

Gohreh (Persian: گهره) is a village in Gohreh Rural District, Fin District, Bandar Abbas County, Hormozgan Province, Iran. At the 2006 census, its population was 399, in 88 families.
