= Gari Guri =

Gari Guri گري گوري
- Village
- Location within Iran
- Coordinates: 27°49′50″N 56°27′36″E
- Country: Iran
- Province: Hormozgan
- County: Bandar Abbas
- Bakhsh: Fin
- Rural District: Siyahu

Population (2006)
  - Total: 16
- Time zone: UTC+3:30 (IRST)
  - Summer (DST): UTC+4:30 (IRDT)

Gari Guri (Persian: گري گوري, also Romanized as Garī Gūrī) is a village in Siyahu Rural District, Fin District, Bandar Abbas County, Hormozgan Province, Iran. At the 2006 census, its population was 16, in 6 families.
