= Bast-e Bikh =

Bast-e Bikh بست بيخ
- Village
- Location within Iran
- Coordinates: 27°34′00″N 55°23′02″E
- Country: Iran
- Province: Hormozgan
- County: Bandar Abbas
- Bakhsh: Fin
- Rural District: Fin

Population (2006)
  - Total: 65
- Time zone: UTC+3:30 (IRST)
  - Summer (DST): UTC+4:30 (IRDT)

Bast-e Bikh (Persian: بست بيخ, also Romanized as Bast-e Bīkh) is a village in Fin Rural District, Fin District, Bandar Abbas County, Hormozgan Province, Iran. At the 2006 census, its population was 65, in 14 families.
