= Poruzak =

Poruzak پروزك
- village
- Location within Iran
- Coordinates: 27°36′22″N 55°28′19″E
- Country: Iran
- Province: Hormozgan
- County: Bandar Abbas
- Bakhsh: Fin
- Rural District: Fin

Population (2016)
  - Total: 109
- Time zone: UTC+3:30 (IRST)

Poruzak (Persian: پروزك, also Romanized as Porūzak) is a village in Fin Rural District, Fin District, Bandar Abbas County, Hormozgan Province, Iran. At the 2006 census, its population was 58, in 12 families.
