= Chakarteh =

Chakarteh چاكرته
- Village
- Location within Iran
- Coordinates: 27°39′32″N 55°48′28″E
- Country: Iran
- Province: Hormozgan
- County: Bandar Abbas
- Bakhsh: Fin
- Rural District: Fin

Population (2006)
  - Total: 77
- Time zone: UTC+3:30 (IRST)
  - Summer (DST): UTC+4:30 (IRDT)

Chakarteh (Persian: چاكرته, also Romanized as Chākarteh; also known as Chāh Kartū) is a village in Fin Rural District, Fin District, Bandar Abbas County, Hormozgan Province, Iran. At the 2006 census, its population was 77, in 15 families.
