= Qotbabad-e Gohreh =

Village in Hormozgan province, Iran

Qotbabad-e Gohreh Persian: قطب اباد گهره
- Village
- Location within Iran
- Coordinates: 27°46′11″N 56°04′25″E
- Country: Iran
- Province: Hormozgan
- County: Bandar Abbas
- District: Fin
- Rural District: Gohreh

Population (2016)
  - Total: 522
- Time zone: UTC+3:30 (IRST)

Qotbabad-e Gohreh (Persian: قطب اباد گهره) (Note: Also known as Ghotb Abad, Kuhawad, Kūrwād, Kūrwēd, Kutawad, Qoţbābād, and Qoţbābād-Bnd) is a village in, and the capital of, Gohreh Rural District of Fin District, Bandar Abbas County, Hormozgan province, Iran.

== Demographics ==
=== Population ===
At the time of the 2006 National Census, the village's population was 694 in 187 households. The following census in 2011 counted 550 people in 161 households. The 2016 census measured the population of the village as 522 people in 175 households. It was the most populous village in its rural district.
