= Homag =

Homag (Persian: هماگ), or Homak or Homay or Homa may refer to:

- Homay, East Azerbaijan
- Homag-e Bala, Hormozgan Province
- Homag-e Pain, Hormozgan Province
- Homay, Iran (disambiguation)
