= Hümaşah Sultan =

Hümaşah Sultan may refer to:

- Hüma Hatun (1410-1449), consort of Ottoman Sultan Murad II and mother of Mehmed II
- Hümaşah Sultan (daughter of Bayezid II) (1466–1518), Ottoman princess and daughter of Bayezid II
- Ayşe Hümaşah Sultan (1541–1598), daughter of Mihrimah Sultan and granddaughter of Süleyman the Magnificent and Hürrem Sultan
- Hümaşah Sultan (daughter of Şehzade Mehmed) (1543-1582), Ottoman princess, daughter of Şehzade Mehmed and granddaughter of Süleyman the Magnificent and Hürrem Sultan
- Hümaşah Sultan (daughter of Murad III) (c. 1564 – ?), Ottoman princess, daughter of Murad III and Safiye Sultan
- Hümaşah Sultan (17th century), Ottoman princess, daughter of Sultan Mehmed III
- Hümaşah Sultan (wife of Ibrahim) (17th century), wife of Sultan Ibrahim of the Ottoman Empire

== See also ==
- Huma (disambiguation)
