= Zoratu Bala =

Zoratu Bala زرتوبالا
- Village
- Location within Iran
- Coordinates: 27°42′30″N 56°10′54″E
- Country: Iran
- Province: Hormozgan
- County: Bandar Abbas
- Bakhsh: Fin
- Rural District: Gohreh

Population (2006)
  - Total: 61
- Time zone: UTC+3:30 (IRST)
  - Summer (DST): UTC+4:30 (IRDT)

Zoratu Bala (Persian: زرتوبالا, also Romanized as Z̄oratū Bālā and Zartū-ye Bālā; also known as Zaztoo, Z̄orratū, and Zūrātū) is a village in Gohreh Rural District, Fin District, Bandar Abbas County, Hormozgan Province, Iran. At the 2006 census, its population was 61, in 23 families.
