= Houma =

Houma can refer to:

- Houma people, a historical Native American tribes

== Native American studies ==
- Houma language, a Western Muskogean language
- United Houma Nation, a state-recognized tribe in Louisiana

== Geography ==
- Houma, Louisiana, city in the United States
- Houma, Shanxi, city in China
- Houma, meaning cape, the name of some capes in Tonga and villages near them such as:
  - Houma (Tongatapu)
  - Houma ('Eua)
  - Houma (Vava'u)

== Other ==
- Houma Indians, baseball team
- Houma (YTB-811), a U.S. Navy tug

== See also ==
- The Houmas, an 18th-century plantation in Louisiana, named for the Houma people
- Homa (disambiguation), which has several different meanings
- Huma (disambiguation), which has several different meanings
