= Aghasin-e Pain =

Aghasin-e Pain اغاسين پائين
- Village
- Location within Iran
- Coordinates: 27°41′46″N 56°27′21″E
- Country: Iran
- Province: Hormozgan
- County: Bandar Abbas
- Bakhsh: Fin
- Rural District: Siyahu

Population (2006)
  - Total: 156
- Time zone: UTC+3:30 (IRST)
  - Summer (DST): UTC+4:30 (IRDT)

Aghasin-e Pain (Persian: اغاسين پائين, also Romanized as Āghāsīn-e Pā’īn; also known as Āqāsīn-e Pā’īn) is a village in Siyahu Rural District, Fin District, Bandar Abbas County, Hormozgan Province, Iran. At the 2006 census, its population was 156, in 50 families.
