= Siyahu =

Village in Hormozgan province, Iran

Siyahu Persian: سياهو
- Village
- Location within Iran
- Coordinates: 27°45′33″N 56°20′08″E
- Country: Iran
- Province: Hormozgan
- County: Bandar Abbas
- District: Central
- Rural District: Siyahu

Population (2016)
  - Total: 1,015
- Time zone: UTC+3:30 (IRST)

Siyahu (Persian: سياهو) (Note: Also romanized as Sīyāhū) is a village in, and the capital of, Siyahu Rural District of the Central District of Bandar Abbas County, Hormozgan province, Iran.

== Demographics ==
=== Population ===
At the time of the 2006 National Census, the village's population was 934 in 244 households, when it was in Fin District. The following census in 2011 counted 1,331 people in 339 households, by which time the rural district had been transferred to the Central District. The 2016 census measured the population of the village as 1,015 people in 288 households. It was the most populous village in its rural district.
