= Sayar =

Sayar (IPA: [saˈjaɾ], literally "he/she/it counts") is a Turkish surname and may refer to:

- Homa Sayar (born 1947), Iranian poet and writer
- Leyla Sayar (1939–2016), Turkish actress, author, ballerina, beauty queen and singer
- Mustafa Sayar (born 1989), Turkish cyclist
- Zeki Sayar (1905–2000), Turkish architect, journalist and the publisher
