= Homag-e Pain =

Homag-e Pain هماگ پائين
- Village
- Location within Iran
- Coordinates: 27°51′52″N 56°28′31″E
- Country: Iran
- Province: Hormozgan
- County: Bandar Abbas
- Bakhsh: Fin
- Rural District: Siyahu

Population (2006)
  - Total: 482
- Time zone: UTC+3:30 (IRST)
  - Summer (DST): UTC+4:30 (IRDT)

Homag-e Pain (Persian: هماگ پائين, also Romanized as Homāg-e Pā’īn; also known as Homāk-e Pā’īn, Homā-ye Pā’īn, and Homay Sofla) is a village in Siyahu Rural District, Fin District, Bandar Abbas County, Hormozgan Province, Iran. At the 2006 census, its population was 482, in 114 families.
