= Huma =

Huma or HUMA may refer to:

== Geography ==
- Huma, a village in Samuil Municipality, Razgrad Province, Bulgaria
- Huma, Iran, a village in Lorestan Province, Iran
- Huma County, a county of Daxing'anling Prefecture in Heilongjiang, China
- Huma River (Heilongjiang), a tributary of the Amur River in Heilongjiang, China
- Huma River (Romania), a tributary of the Nemţişor River in Romania

== Other uses ==
- Huma (company), British health technology company
- Hima people, a social group in Uganda and Tanzania
- Canadian House of Commons Standing Committee on Human Resources, Skills and Social Development and the Status of Persons with Disabilities (HUMA)
- Heterogenous Unified Memory Access (hUMA), a cache-coherent shared memory design
- Mbarara Airport (ICAO code), Uganda
- Huma bird, a mythical bird of Iranian legend
- Huma Dragonbane, a character in the Dragonlance world
- Leaning Temple of Huma, a shrine near Sambalpur, India

== People ==
=== Given name ===
- Huma Abedin (born 1975), American political staffer
- Huma Akbar (born 1960), Pakistani actress
- Huma Anwar, Pakistani translator and editor
- Huma Bhabha (born 1962), Pakistani-American sculptor
- Huma Akhtar Chughtai, Pakistani politician
- Huma Hameed (born 1959), Pakistani actress
- Hüma Hatun (1410–1449), concubine of Ottoman Sultan Murad II and the mother of his successor, Mehmed II
- Huma Javeed (born 1993), Pakistani badminton player
- Huma Mir (born 1970), Pakistani actress, singer, and writer
- Huma Mulji (born 1970), Pakistani artist
- Huma Nawab (born 1969), Pakistani actress
- Huma Qureshi (born 1986), Indian film actress
- Huma Qureshi (journalist), British Pakistani journalist
- Huma Safdar, Pakistani teacher and theatre artist

== See also ==
- Haoma, the Avestan language name of a plant and its divinity
- Homa (disambiguation), which has several different meanings
- Houma (disambiguation), which has several different meanings
