= Aghasin-e Bala =

Aghasin-e Bala اغاسين بالا
- Village
- Location within Iran
- Coordinates: 27°42′16″N 56°23′30″E
- Country: Iran
- Province: Hormozgan
- County: Bandar Abbas
- Bakhsh: Fin
- Rural District: Siyahu

Population (2006)
  - Total: 80
- Time zone: UTC+3:30 (IRST)
  - Summer (DST): UTC+4:30 (IRDT)

Aghasin-e Bala (Persian: اغاسين بالا, also Romanized as Āghāsīn-e Bālā; also known as Āqāsīn-e Bālā) is a village in Siyahu Rural District, Fin District, Bandar Abbas County, Hormozgan Province, Iran. At the 2006 census, its population was 80, in 28 families.
