= Avin-e Sofla =

Avin-e Sofla اوين سفلي
- Village
- Location within Iran
- Coordinates: 27°33′35″N 55°25′23″E
- Country: Iran
- Province: Hormozgan
- County: Bandar Abbas
- Bakhsh: Fin
- Rural District: Fin

Population (2016)
  - Total: 191
- Time zone: UTC+3:30 (IRST)
  - Summer (DST): IRDT

Avin-e Sofla (Persian: اوين سفلي, also Romanized as Āvīn-e Soflá; also known as Āvīn-e Pā’īn and Avin Pa’in) is a village in Fin Rural District, Fin District, Bandar Abbas County, Hormozgan Province, Iran. At the 2016 census, its population was 191, in 60 families.
