= Rezvan, Hormozgan =

Village in Hormozgan province, Iran

Rezvan Persian: رضوان
- Village
- Location within Iran
- Coordinates: 27°34′25″N 56°04′29″E
- Country: Iran
- Province: Hormozgan
- County: Bandar Abbas
- District: Fin
- Rural District: Fin

Population (2016)
  - Total: 5,066
- Time zone: UTC+3:30 (IRST)

Rezvan (Persian: رضوان) (Note: Also romanized as Reẕvān; also known as Rizwān) is a village in Fin Rural District of Fin District, Bandar Abbas County, Hormozgan province, Iran.

== Demographics ==
=== Population ===
At the time of the 2006 National Census, the village's population was 4,359 in 979 households. The following census in 2011 counted 5,014 people in 1,332 households. The 2016 census measured the population of the village as 5,066 people in 1,444 households. It was the most populous village in its rural district.
