= Agha =

Agha may refer to:

- Agha (name)
- Agha (title), a civilian and military title in the Middle East
- Agha, Iran (disambiguation), places in Iran

== See also ==
- Aga (disambiguation)
- Aga Khan (disambiguation) (or Agha Khan), the Persian name used by the Imam of the Nizari Ismailis
- Agassi, a surname
- Aghasi (name)
- Aghasin (disambiguation)
- Aghasura, a demon in Hindu mythology, particularly in the Bhagavata Purana
- Aqasi, a surname
