= Bangelayan =

Bangelayan بنگلايان
- Village
- Location within Iran
- Coordinates: 27°45′34″N 56°32′34″E
- Country: Iran
- Province: Hormozgan
- County: Bandar Abbas
- Bakhsh: Fin
- Rural District: Siyahu

Population (2006)
  - Total: 187
- Time zone: UTC+3:30 (IRST)
  - Summer (DST): UTC+4:30 (IRDT)

Bangelayan (Persian: بنگلايان, also Romanized as Bangelāyān; also known as Bangolān) is a village in Siyahu Rural District, Fin District, Bandar Abbas County, Hormozgan Province, Iran. At the 2006 census, its population was 187, in 53 families.
