= Homay, Iran =

Homay (Persian: هماي), also rendered as Umay or Umai or Homa, in Iran may refer to:

- Homay-e Olya
- Homay-e Sofla
- Homag (disambiguation)
