= Hurmudar-e Pain =

Hurmudar-e Pain هورمودرپائين
- Village
- Location within Iran
- Coordinates: 27°27′40″N 55°59′07″E
- Country: Iran
- Province: Hormozgan
- County: Bandar Abbas
- Bakhsh: Fin
- Rural District: Fin

Population (2006)
  - Total: 36
- Time zone: UTC+3:30 (IRST)
  - Summer (DST): UTC+4:30 (IRDT)

Hurmudar-e Pain (Persian: هورمودرپائين, also Romanized as Hūrmūdar-e Pā’īn) is a village in Fin Rural District, Fin District, Bandar Abbas County, Hormozgan Province, Iran. At the 2006 census, its population was 36, in 8 families.
