= Hurmudar-e Bala =

Hurmudar-e Bala هورمودربالا
- Village
- Location within Iran
- Coordinates: 27°26′37″N 56°01′57″E
- Country: Iran
- Province: Hormozgan
- County: Bandar Abbas
- Bakhsh: Fin
- Rural District: Fin

Population (2006)
  - Total: 28
- Time zone: UTC+3:30 (IRST)
  - Summer (DST): UTC+4:30 (IRDT)

Hurmudar-e Bala (Persian: هورمودربالا, also Romanized as Hūrmūdār-e Bālā and Hūrmūdar Bāla; also known as Hormūdar, Hormūdar-e Bālā, and Hūrmūdār) is a village in Fin Rural District, Fin District, Bandar Abbas County, Hormozgan Province, Iran. At the 2006 census, its population was 28, in 7 families.
