= Mashari =

Mashari ماشاري
- Village
- Location within Iran
- Coordinates: 27°46′37″N 56°31′37″E
- Country: Iran
- Province: Hormozgan
- County: Bandar Abbas
- Bakhsh: Central District (Bandar Abbas County)
- Rural District: Siyahu

Population (2006)
  - Total: 75
- Time zone: UTC+3:30 (IRST)
  - Summer (DST): UTC+4:30 (IRDT)

Mashari (Persian: ماشاري, also Romanized as Māshārī) is a village in Siyahu Rural District, Central District (Bandar Abbas County), Bandar Abbas County, Hormozgan Province, Iran. At the 2006 census, its population was 75, in 25 families.
