= Tutang =

Tutang توتنگ
- Village
- Location within Iran
- Coordinates: 27°54′31″N 56°24′39″E
- Country: Iran
- Province: Hormozgan
- County: Bandar Abbas
- Bakhsh: Fin
- Rural District: Siyahu

Population (2006)
  - Total: 233
- Time zone: UTC+3:30 (IRST)
  - Summer (DST): UTC+4:30 (IRDT)

Tutang (Persian: توتنگ, also Romanized as Tūtang; also known as Homā-ye Bālā) is a village in Siyahu Rural District, Fin District, Bandar Abbas County, Hormozgan Province, Iran. At the 2006 census, its population was 233, in 68 families.
