= Bangolan =

Bangolan may refer to:

- Bangolan language, of Cameroon
- Bangolan, Iran, a village in Hormozgan Province, Iran
