= Kuh-e Sofla =

Kuh-e Sofla كوه سفلي
- Village
- Location within Iran
- Coordinates: 27°44′37″N 56°19′54″E
- Country: Iran
- Province: Hormozgan
- County: Bandar Abbas
- Bakhsh: Fin
- Rural District: Siyahu

Population (2006)
  - Total: 64
- Time zone: UTC+3:30 (IRST)
  - Summer (DST): UTC+4:30 (IRDT)

Kuh-e Sofla (Persian: كوه سفلي, also Romanized as Kūh-e Soflá; also known as Kūh-e Pā’īn and Kūveh-ye Pā’īn) is a village in Siyahu Rural District, Fin District, Bandar Abbas County, Hormozgan Province, Iran. At the 2006 census, its population was 64 across in 18 families.
