= Agassiz Glacier =

Agassiz Glacier may refer to:

- Agassiz Glacier (Alaska)
- Agassiz Glacier (Montana)
- Agassiz Glacier (New Zealand)

== See also ==
- Agassiz Ice Cap, formerly the Agassiz Glacier in Canada
