= Zoratu Pain =

Zoratu Pain زرتوپائين
- Village
- Location within Iran
- Coordinates: 27°42′18″N 56°12′46″E
- Country: Iran
- Province: Hormozgan
- County: Bandar Abbas
- Bakhsh: Fin
- Rural District: Gohreh

Population (2006)
  - Total: 31
- Time zone: UTC+3:30 (IRST)
  - Summer (DST): UTC+4:30 (IRDT)

Zoratu Pain (Persian: زرتوپائين, also Romanized as Z̄oratū Pā’īn and Z̄orratū-ye Pā’īn) is a village in Gohreh Rural District, Fin District, Bandar Abbas County, Hormozgan Province, Iran. At the 2006 census, its population was 31, in 8 families.
