= Ivaj =

Village in Lorestan province, Iran

Ivaj Persian: ايوج
- Village
- Location within Iran
- Coordinates: 33°06′50″N 49°44′15″E
- Country: Iran
- Province: Lorestan
- County: Aligudarz
- District: Borborud-e Sharqi
- Rural District: Farsesh

Population (2016)
  - Total: 188
- Time zone: UTC+3:30 (IRST)

Ivaj (Persian: ايوج) (Note: Also romanized as Īvaj, Ivej, and Īvej) is a village in Farsesh Rural District of Borborud-e Sharqi District in Aligudarz County, Lorestan province, Iran.

== Demographics ==
=== Population ===
At the time of the 2006 National Census, the village's population was 309 in 58 households, when it was in the Central District. The following census in 2011 counted 245 people in 55 households. The 2016 census measured the population of the village as 188 people in 43 households, by which time the rural district had been separated from the district in the formation of Borborud-e Sharqi District.
