= Homag-e Bala =

Homag-e Bala هماگ بالا
- Village
- Location within Iran
- Coordinates: 27°54′06″N 56°27′11″E
- Country: Iran
- Province: Hormozgan
- County: Bandar Abbas
- Bakhsh: Fin
- Rural District: Siyahu

Population (2006)
  - Total: 202
- Time zone: UTC+3:30 (IRST)
  - Summer (DST): UTC+4:30 (IRDT)

Homag-e Bala (Persian: هماگ بالا, also Romanized as Homāg-e Bālā; also known as Homāk, Homāy, Homā-ye Bālā, Homay Olya, and Mīrū) is a village in Siyahu Rural District, Fin District, Bandar Abbas County, Hormozgan Province, Iran. At the 2006 census, its population was 202, in 68 families.
