= Fin, Iran =

City in Hormozgan province, Iran

Fin Persian: فین
- City
- Location within Iran
- Coordinates: 27°37′49″N 55°53′46″E
- Country: Iran
- Province: Hormozgan
- County: Bandar Abbas
- District: Fin

Population (2016)
  - Total: 3,939
- Time zone: UTC+3:30 (IRST)
- Area code: 0782-362

Fin (Persian: فين) (Note: Also romanized as Fīn) is a city in, and the capital of, Fin District of Bandar Abbas County, Hormozgan province, Iran. It also serves as the administrative center for Fin Rural District.

== Demographics ==
=== Population ===
At the time of the 2006 National Census, the city's population was 3,532 in 860 households. The following census in 2011 counted 5,279 people in 1,325 households. The 2016 census measured the population of the city as 3,939 people in 1,161 households.

== 2021 earthquake ==
On 14 November 2021, Fin experienced a major doublet earthquake.

== See also ==
- Kookherd
- Bastak
- Bandar Lengeh
- Hormozgān
