= Farsesh =

Village in Lorestan province, Iran

Farsesh Persian: فرسش
- Village
- Location within Iran
- Coordinates: 33°05′26″N 49°51′56″E
- Country: Iran
- Province: Lorestan
- County: Aligudarz
- District: Borborud-e Sharqi
- Rural District: Farsesh

Population (2016)
  - Total: 823
- Time zone: UTC+3:30 (IRST)

Farsesh (Persian: فرسش) (Note: Also known as Parsish and Porsesh) is a village in, and the capital of, Farsesh Rural District in Borborud-e Sharqi District of Aligudarz County, Lorestan province, Iran.

== Demographics ==
=== Population ===
At the time of the 2006 National Census, the village's population was 1,445 in 285 households, when it was in the Central District. The following census in 2011 counted 916 people in 240 households. The 2016 census measured the population of the village as 823 people in 226 households, by which time the rural district had been separated from the district in the formation of Borborud-e Sharqi District. Farsesh was the most populous village in its rural district.
