= Farsesh Rural District =

Rural district in Lorestan province, Iran

Farsesh Rural District Persian: دهستان فرسش
- Rural District
- Location within Iran
- Coordinates: 33°06′N 49°49′E
- Country: Iran
- Province: Lorestan
- County: Aligudarz
- District: Borborud-e Sharqi
- Established: 1987
- Capital: Farsesh

Population (2016)
  - Total: 1,960
- Time zone: UTC+3:30 (IRST)

Farsesh Rural District (Persian: دهستان فرسش) is in Borborud-e Sharqi District of Aligudarz County, Lorestan province, Iran. Its capital is the village of Farsesh.

== Demographics ==
=== Population ===
At the time of the 2006 National Census, the rural district's population (as a part of the Central District) was 3,132 in 608 households. There were 2,258 inhabitants in 563 households at the following census of 2011. The 2016 census measured the population of the rural district as 1,960 in 557 households, by which time it had been separated from the district in the formation of Borborud-e Sharqi District. The most populous of its 12 villages was Farsesh, with 823 people.

=== Other villages in the rural district ===
- Fahreh
- Haveh
- Homa
- Ivaj
- Qarah Khan
