= Aghasi (name) =

Aghasi or Aghassi may refer to:

== Given name ==
- Agasi Babayan or Aghasi Babayan (1908–1995), Armenian film director, screenwriter and actor
- Aghasi Khan (1731–1788), Second khan of Shirvan khanate
- Aghasi Khanjian (1901–1936), Soviet Armenian politician, Secretary of the Communist Party of Armenia
- Aghasi Mammadov (born 1980), Azerbaijani boxer
- Aghasi Manukyan (1967–2018), Armenian Greco-Roman wrestler

== Surname ==
- Aref Aghasi (born 1997), Iranian footballer
- Haji Mirza Aqasi or Aghasi, Iranian politician, who served as the grand vizier of the Qajar king (shah) Mohammad Shah Qajar
- Ibrahim Pasha Qattar Aghasi, Ottoman statesman and wali
- Kizlar Aghasi, head of the eunuchs in the harem of the Ottoman Sultan
- Nematollah Aghasi (1939–2005), Iranian songer and songwriter

== Others ==
- Ashik Aghasi, a village on Iran
- Kol Aghasi, a military rank in the Ottoman Army

== See also ==
- Agassi
- Agha (disambiguation)
- Aghasin (disambiguation)
- Aqasi
