= Fahreh, Lorestan =

Village in Lorestan province, Iran

Fahreh Persian: فهره
- Village
- Location within Iran
- Coordinates: 33°04′38″N 49°48′12″E
- Country: Iran
- Province: Lorestan
- County: Aligudarz
- District: Borborud-e Sharqi
- Rural District: Farsesh

Population (2016)
  - Total: 489
- Time zone: UTC+3:30 (IRST)

Fahreh (Persian: فهره) is a village in Farsesh Rural District of Borborud-e Sharqi District in Aligudarz County, Lorestan province, Iran.

== Demographics ==
=== Population ===
At the time of the 2006 National Census, the village's population was 800 in 159 households, when it was in the Central District. The following census in 2011 counted 584 people in 144 households. The 2016 census measured the population of the village as 489 people in 151 households, by which time the rural district had been separated from the district in the formation of Borborud-e Sharqi District.
