= Aqasi =

Aqasi is an Iranian name. Notable people with the name include:

- Haji Mirza Aqasi (c. 1783–1849), Iranian political leader
- Hossein Qollar-Aqasi, Iranian painter

== See also ==
- Agassi
- Agha (disambiguation)
- Aghasi (name)
- Aghasin (disambiguation)
