= Homam =

Homam may refer to:

- Homam (star), the traditional name of the star Zeta Pegasi
- Heroes of Might and Magic, a series of computer games
- Homam (film), a 2008 Telugu film
- Homam, Iran, a village in Isfahan Province, Iran
- Homam-e Tabrizi, Persian poet

== See also ==
- Homa (disambiguation)
- Homa (ritual), a Hindu ceremonial ritual
