= Haveh, Lorestan =

Village in Lorestan province, Iran

Haveh Persian: هوه
- Village
- Location within Iran
- Coordinates: 33°04′14″N 49°46′16″E
- Country: Iran
- Province: Lorestan
- County: Aligudarz
- District: Borborud-e Sharqi
- Rural District: Farsesh

Population (2016)
  - Total: 39
- Time zone: UTC+3:30 (IRST)

Haveh (Persian: هوه) (Note: Also romanized as Hoveh) is a village in Farsesh Rural District of Borborud-e Sharqi District in Aligudarz County, Lorestan province, Iran.

== Demographics ==
=== Population ===
At the time of the 2006 National Census, the village's population was 16 in six households, when it was in the Central District. The following census in 2011 counted 36 people in 11 households. The 2016 census measured the population of the village as 39 people in 13 households, by which time the rural district had been separated from the district in the formation of Borborud-e Sharqi District.
