= Agha (name) =

Agha (Turkish: ağa; Ottoman Turkish: آغا; Persian: آقا, romanized: āghā), or Al-Agha in Arabic, is a name meaning master or chief. The word agha entered English from Turkish, and the Turkish word comes from the Old Turkic aqa, meaning "elder brother". Notable people with the name include:

== Given name ==
- Agha (actor) (1914–1992), Indian actor
- Agha Siraj Durrani (1953–2025), Pakistani politician

== Surname ==
- Abdul Fattah Al Agha (born 1984), Syrian professional footballer
- Aref Al Agha (born 1976), Syrian professional footballer
- Haifa al-Agha, Palestinian politician and minister
- Hanan Al-Agha (1948–2008), Palestinian plastic artist and writer
- Hashem Al-e-Agha (1945–1984), Iranian fighter pilot
- Ibrahim Agha, commander-in-chief of the Algerian forces during the Invasion of Algiers
- Jafar Agha (died 1905), Iranian Kurdish chieftan
- Jalal Agha (1945–1995), Indian actor and film director
- Mariam Agha, Pakistani cricketer
- Mustafa Agha (born 1963), British-Syrian sports journalist
- Riyad Naasan Agha (1947–2025), Syrian politician and diplomat
- Sarah Agha, British actress, presenter, and writer
- Zakaria al-Agha (1942–2025), Palestinian politician

== See also ==
- Agha (disambiguation)
