= Qarah Khan, Lorestan =

Village in Lorestan province, Iran

Qarah Khan Persian: قره خان
- Village
- Location within Iran
- Coordinates: 33°05′30″N 49°49′26″E
- Country: Iran
- Province: Lorestan
- County: Aligudarz
- District: Borborud-e Sharqi
- Rural District: Farsesh

Population (2016)
  - Total: 47
- Time zone: UTC+3:30 (IRST)

Qarah Khan (Persian: قره خان) (Note: Also romanized as Qarah Khān; also known as Ghareh Khan) is a village in Farsesh Rural District of Borborud-e Sharqi District in Aligudarz County, Lorestan province, Iran.

== Demographics ==
=== Population ===
At the time of the 2006 National Census, the village's population was 111 in 20 households, when it was in the Central District. The following census in 2011 counted 82 people in 21 households. The 2016 census measured the population of the village as 47 people in 16 households, by which time the rural district had been separated from the district in the formation of Borborud-e Sharqi District.
