= Agassiz School =

- U.S. National Register of Historic Places
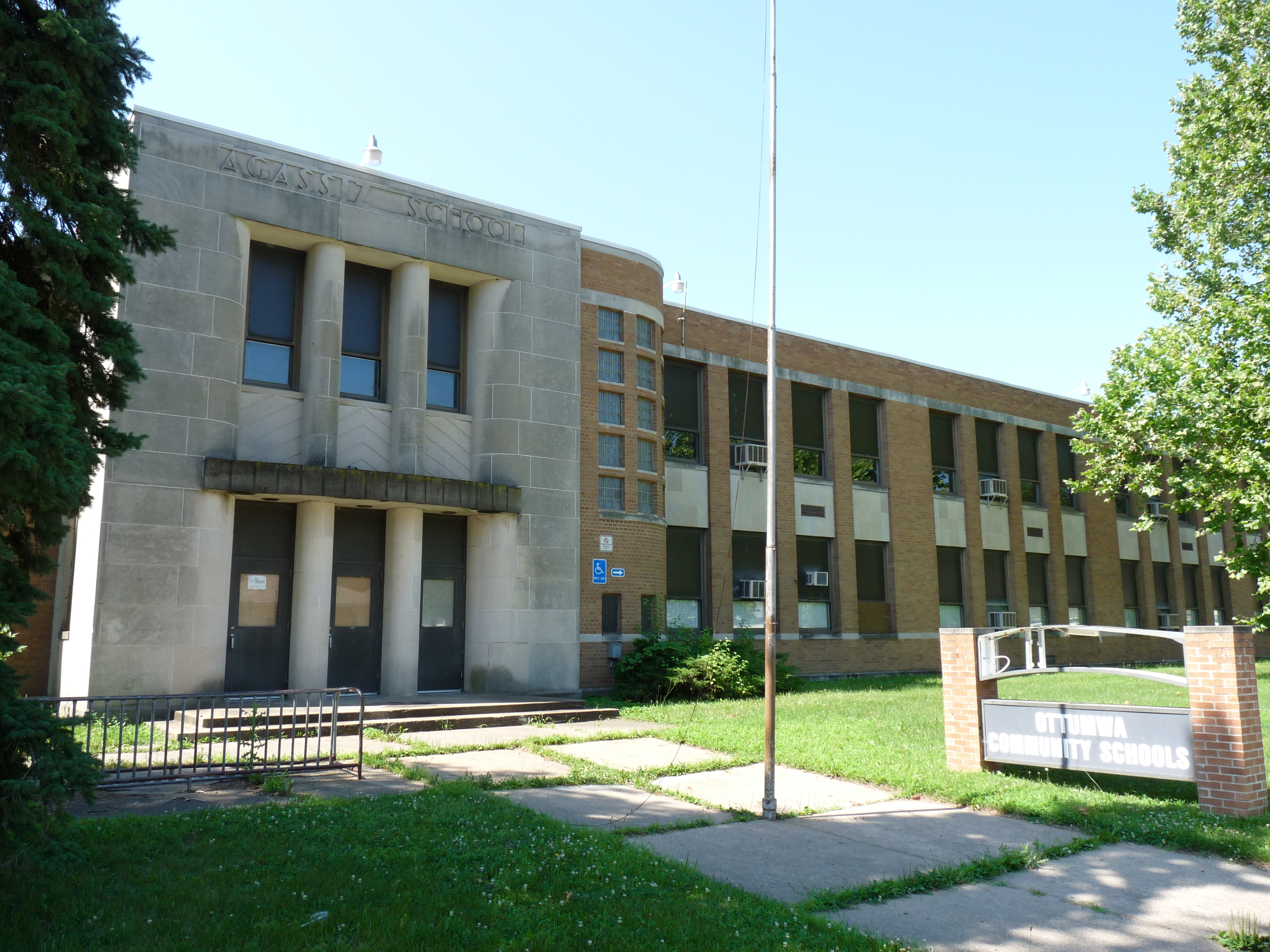

- Location within Iowa Location within the United States
- Location: 608 East Williams St. Ottumwa, Iowa
- Coordinates: 41°59′52.8″N 92°24′59.6″W
- Area: less than one acre
- Built: 1941
- Architectural style: Art Deco
- NRHP reference No.: 100005787
- Added to NRHP: November 12, 2020

Agassiz School is a historic building located in Ottumwa, Iowa, United States. The two-story, light brick, Art Deco structure was completed in 1941. Named for Louis Agassiz, it replaced another school of the same name from the late 1880s that was located on the same property. Allegorical figures "sowing the seeds of knowledge" in limestone reliefs circle the building, which also features a curved wall, glass blocks, and glazed tiles. A good deal of the original decorative elements remain in the building. The original windows, however, were replaced with more energy-efficient windows in the 1970s. Agassiz served as a public elementary school until 2013 when it was closed along with two other schools after Liberty School was completed. The building was listed on the National Register of Historic Places in 2020.

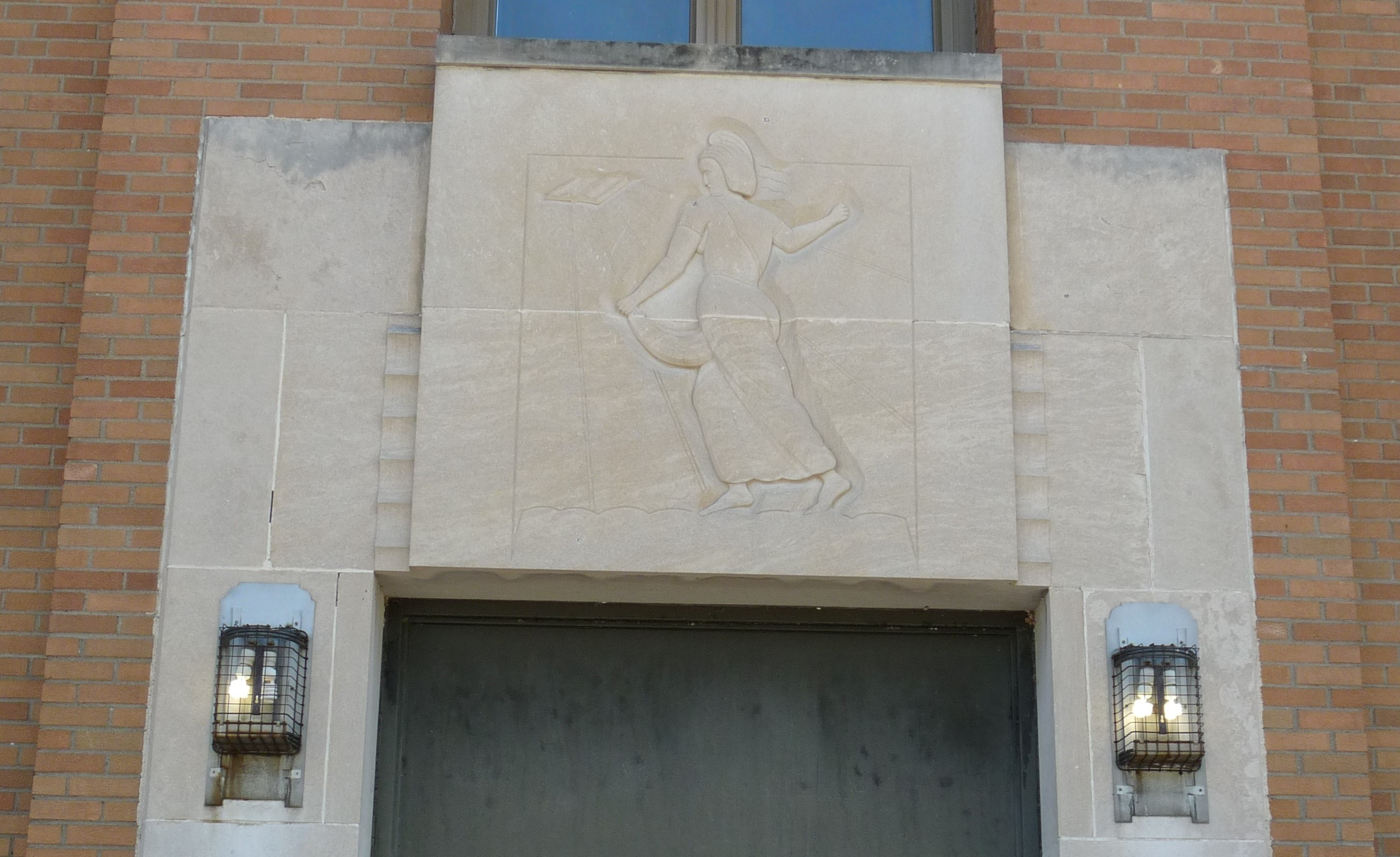
Decorative panel above west entrance
