= Hurmudar, Isin =

Hurmudar هورمودر
- Village
- Location within Iran
- Coordinates: 27°19′00″N 56°18′51″E
- Country: Iran
- Province: Hormozgan
- County: Bandar Abbas
- Bakhsh: Central
- Rural District: Isin

Population (2006)
  - Total: 644
- Time zone: UTC+3:30 (IRST)
  - Summer (DST): UTC+4:30 (IRDT)

Hurmudar (Persian: هورمودر, also Romanized as Hūrmūdar; also known as Hermoodar Bala, Hermūdar, Hurmūdar Bāla, Hūrmūrd, and Khvormehdān-e Bālā) is a village in Isin Rural District, in the Central District of Bandar Abbas County, Hormozgan Province, Iran. At the 2006 census, its population was 644, in 159 families.
