= Agha, Iran =

Agha (Persian: آقا or آغا) in Iran, may refer to:

- Agha, Kermanshah
- Agha, Lorestan
- Agha, Razavi Khorasan
