= Agassi =

Agassi is a surname most prevalent among certain ethnic groups in and around Iran, such as Assyrians, Babylonian and Persian Jews and (rarely) Persian Muslims. In many cases it is an anglicization of the Armenian surname Aghassian.

== People with the given name ==
- Agasi Babayan, (1921–1995) Armenian film director, screenwriter and actor

== People with the surname ==
- Andre Agassi (born 1970), American retired professional tennis player
- Carlos Agassi (born 1979), Iranian-Filipino rapper and model
- Emmanuel Agassi (1930–2021), Armenian boxer from Iran, father of Andre Agassi
- Evin Agassi (1945–2024), Assyrian singer

=== People of Jewish origin with the surname ===
- Joseph Agassi (1927–2023), Israeli academic
- Shai Agassi (born 1968), Israeli executive
- Shimon Agassi (1852–1914), Baghdadi rabbi

== Other uses ==
- Agassi (film), a 2016 South Korean thriller film

== See also ==
- Agassiz (disambiguation)
- Aghasi (name)
- Aghasin
- Agha
- Aqasi
