= USS Agassiz =

Gunboat of the United States Navy

History

United States
- Commissioned: 1861
- Decommissioned: 1865
- Fate: Returned to the United States Coast Survey

USS Agassiz was borrowed by the Union Navy from the United States Coast Survey during the American Civil War. She was used by the Union Navy as a gunboat in support of the Union Navy blockade of Confederate waterways.

== Service history ==
Soon after the outbreak of the Civil War, the United States Coast Survey ship Agassiz was transferred to the Revenue Cutter Service and took the place of Arago as a receiving ship in New York Harbor. On 30 December 1861, she was ordered to Sag Harbor at the end of Long Island, New York, and served as a revenue cutter at that port into the spring of 1862. On 4 June 1862, the vessel was ordered to New London, Connecticut, and arrived at her new base six days later. On 23 December 1862, Agassiz departed New London and headed south for service in the sounds of North Carolina. She arrived at New Bern, North Carolina, on 11 January 1863 and supported both Union Army troops and warships of the Union Navy in those dangerous waters into the summer. It is logical to assume that, during this assignment, she was subject to Navy orders, but no documents supporting this hypothesis have been found.

The highlight of her service in the war zone came on the night of 13 and 14 March 1863 when she helped Union gunboats USS Hunchback, USS Hetzel, USS Ceres, and USS Shawsheen in their efforts to repel a heavy attack by Confederate soldiers against Fort Anderson, North Carolina, on the Neuse River. After that action, Comdr. Alexander Murray, the senior naval officer in the sounds of North Carolina, praised "the efficient service rendered by Lieutenant Commanding Robert H. Travers, of the U. S. revenue cutter Agassiz ...The gallant part taken by that vessel was alike creditable to its commanding officer and serviceable in the repulse of the enemy."

After the damage the cutter had suffered during the action had been repaired by the Norfolk Navy Yard, Agassiz returned north and arrived at New Bedford, Massachusetts, on 27 July 1863, and she seems to have served there through the end of the Civil War. She moved to Newport, Rhode Island, on 10 October 1865; and, on 29 December of that year, was ordered to New York City where she was transferred back to the U.S. Coast Survey.
