= Homay-e Sofla =

Homay-e Sofla هماي سفلي
- Village
- Location within Iran
- Coordinates: 38°30′53″N 46°24′55″E
- Country: Iran
- Province: East Azerbaijan
- County: Varzaqan
- Bakhsh: Central
- Rural District: Sina

Population (2006)
  - Total: 205
- Time zone: UTC+3:30 (IRST)
  - Summer (DST): UTC+4:30 (IRDT)

Homay-e Sofla (Persian: هماي سفلي, also Romanized as Homāy-e Soflá; also known as Homā-ye Pā’īn, Homāy-e Pā’īn, Homā-ye Soflá, Homāy Pā’īn, Umai, Ūmay, and Umay-Ashaga) is a village in Sina Rural District, in the Central District of Varzaqan County, East Azerbaijan Province, Iran. At the 2006 census, its population was 205, in 46 families.
