= Baldwin, Cambridge, Massachusetts =

Neighborhood in Cambridge, Massachusetts

Coordinates: 42°23′1″N 71°6′58″W

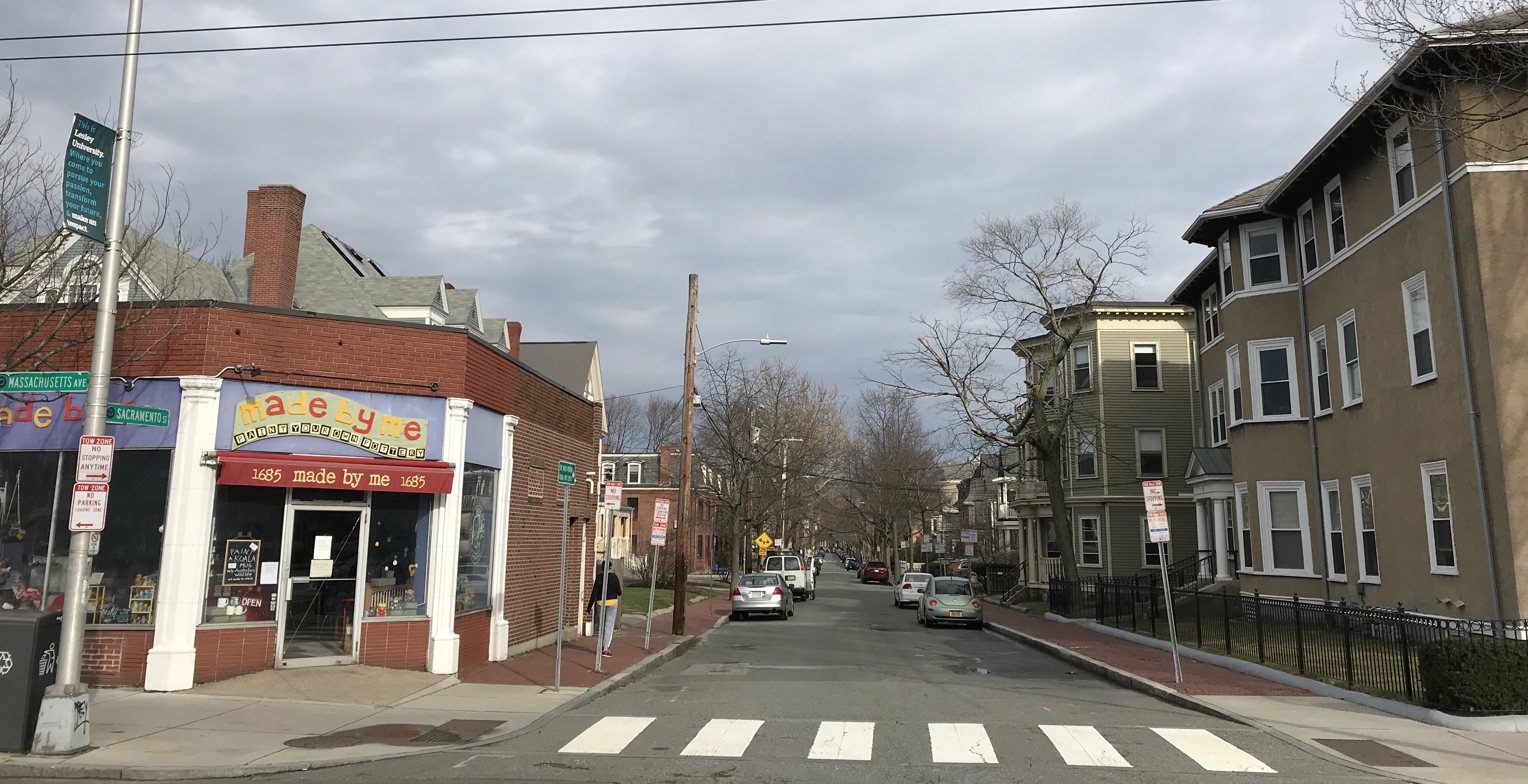
Sacramento Street

Baldwin, formerly known as Agassiz and also called Harvard North, Area 8 or Agassiz/Baldwin, is one of the thirteen neighborhoods of Cambridge, Massachusetts, United States. Bounded by Massachusetts Avenue on the west, Cambridge Street, Quincy Street, and Kirkland Street on the south, Porter Square on the north, and the Somerville border on the northeast. It contains the Maria L. Baldwin Elementary School, known as the Agassiz School until 2002. It also contains all of Lesley University and much of Harvard University, including the Harvard Science Center and the Harvard University Law School.

== History ==
The neighborhood was formerly named for Louis Agassiz (1807-1873), a Harvard biologist and geologist. After being informally known as Agassiz/Baldwin for several years, in 2021 the neighborhood was renamed for Maria Louise Baldwin (1856-1922), an African American educator who, as principal of the former Agassiz School, was the first Black woman principal in New England. Like many places and buildings formerly named for Agassiz, this change came following controversy over his scientific racist beliefs, including polygenism and eugenics. The change was first proposed in City Council by Cambridge high school student Maya Counter in 2020.

== Geography ==
In 2005 the neighborhood had a population of 5,241 residents living in 1,891 households, and the average household income was $55,380. In 2020 the Baldwin population was 5,146 in 1,987 households and median household income was $96,858 (based on 2013-2017).

The Baldwin neighborhood has two zip codes 02138 and 02140, which also serve the villages of West and North Cambridge, respectively.
