= Cerro Bertrand =

Mountain in Argentina and Chile

- Location within Chile

Highest point
- Elevation: 2,647 m (8,684 ft)
- Coordinates: 50°0′50″S 73°26′38″W

Geography
- Location: Argentina and Chile
- Parent range: Andes

Cerro Bertrand, Cerro Oasis or Agassiz Sur is a mountain in the mountain range of the Andes, located in the border between Argentina and Chile, in the region of Patagonia.

According to the study by glaciologist Cedomir Marangunic, the original location of Cerro Bertrand is that of Oasis/Agassiz Sur. Bertrand has been confused with Cerro Agassiz by Alberto María de Agostini and with Cerro Roma in the 1998 agreement.

The mountain is named after the Chilean geographer, Alejandro Bertrand.
