= Viraja Homa =

Hindu fire-sacrifice

The Viraja Homa is a Hindu fire-sacrifice which is performed during the ceremonies whereby a Hindu monk takes up the vows of renunciation (Sannyasa). The Viraja Homa is thus part of the full Sannyasa Deeksha (monastic initiation). This Homa is also performed while preparing or making sacred ash, or vibhooti, from pure cow dung. This is typically performed during the month of Shivarathri. During this homa, some portions from the Maha Narayanopanishad are chanted with related prayogas as prescribed.

== See also ==
- Homa (ritual)
- Sanyasa
- Deeksha
