= Ava Homa =

Iranian Kurdish writer, journalist (born 1981)

- آوا هما
- Born: January 1981 (age 44–45); Iran
- Other name: Āvā Humā
- Education: Allameh Tabataba'i University (BA), University of Windsor (MA)
- Occupations: Writer, educator, journalist

Ava Homa (Persian: آوا هما; born January 1981) is an Iranian Kurdish writer, educator, and journalist. She is the author of Daughters of Smoke and Fire (2020). Her work amplifies marginalized voices especially those of women in Kurdish communities. She lives in California, and teaches at California State University, Monterey Bay.

== Life and career ==
Ava Homa was born in January 1981, in Iran into a Kurdish family, and grew up in Sanandaj, Iranian Kurdistan. She moved to Tehran to attend university at Allameh Tabataba'i University, and taught at Islamic Azad University. Later, she immigrated to Canada where she received her MA degree from University of Windsor in Windsor, Ontario. She is a silver winner of Nautilus Book Awards for fiction in 2020.

== Publications ==
- Homa, Ava (October 1, 2010). Echoes from the Other Land. TSAR Publications. ISBN 978-1-894770-64-4.
- Homa, Ava (May 12, 2020). Daughters of Smoke and Fire (1st ed.). The Overlook Press. ISBN 978-1419743092.
