= Houma (YTB-811) =

Tugboat of the United States Navy

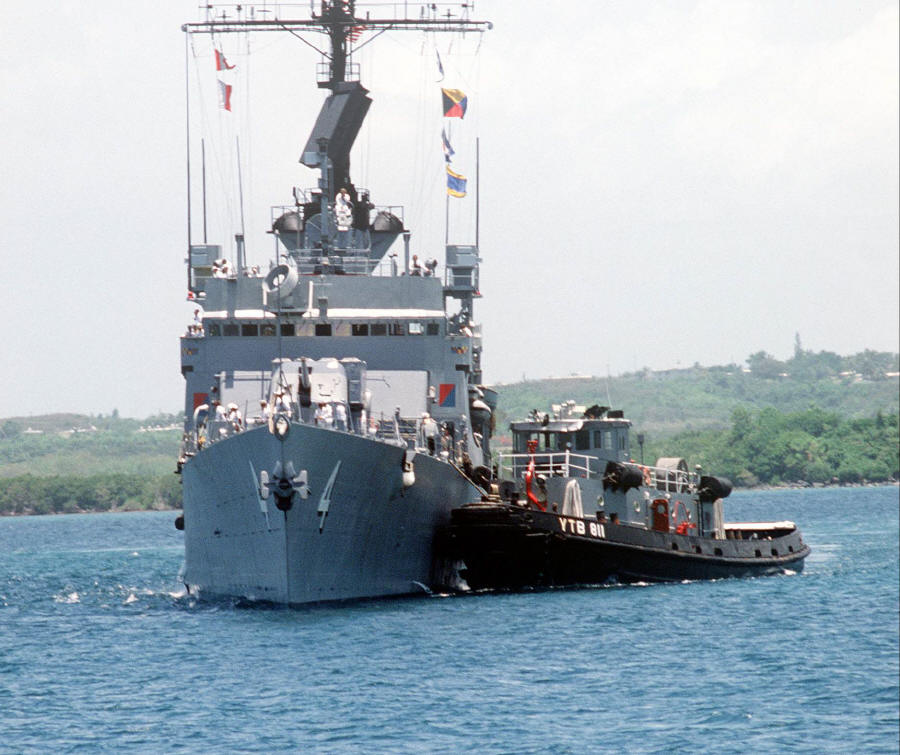
- Houma (YTB-811) assists USS Talbot (DEG-4) into her berth at Naval Station, Roosevelt Roads, Puerto Rico, 14 June 1984.

History

United States
- Awarded: 22 June 1970
- Builder: Peterson Builders, Sturgeon Bay, WI
- Laid down: 1 December 1970
- Launched: 8 May 1971
- In service: 23 September 1971
- Stricken: 9 November 1999
- Identification: IMO number: 8990457; MMSI number: 366945050; Callsign: WDB7607
- Fate: Sold 6 March 2003

General characteristics
- Class & type: Natick-class large harbor tug
- Displacement: 282 long tons (287 t) (light); 344 long tons (350 t) (full)
- Length: 109 ft (33 m)
- Beam: 31 ft (9.4 m)
- Draft: 14 ft (4.3 m)
- Speed: 12 knots (14 mph; 22 km/h)
- Complement: 12
- Armament: None

Houma (YTB-811) was a United States Navy Natick-class large harbor tug named for Houma, Louisiana.

== Construction ==
The contract for Houma was awarded 22 June 1970. She was laid down on 1 December 1970 at Sturgeon Bay, Wisconsin, by Peterson Builders and launched 8 May 1971.

== Operational history ==
Delivered to the Navy 23 September 1971, Houma served at Naval Base Roosevelt Roads, San Juan, Puerto Rico.

Stricken from the Navy List 9 November 1999, ex-Houma was sold by the Defense Reutilization and Marketing Service (DRMS), 6 March 2003, to Marine Tug LLC, Falmouth, Maine. Later acquired by McAllister Towing, ex-Houma was renamed Stacy McAllister.
