= Agassiz Glacier (Alaska) =

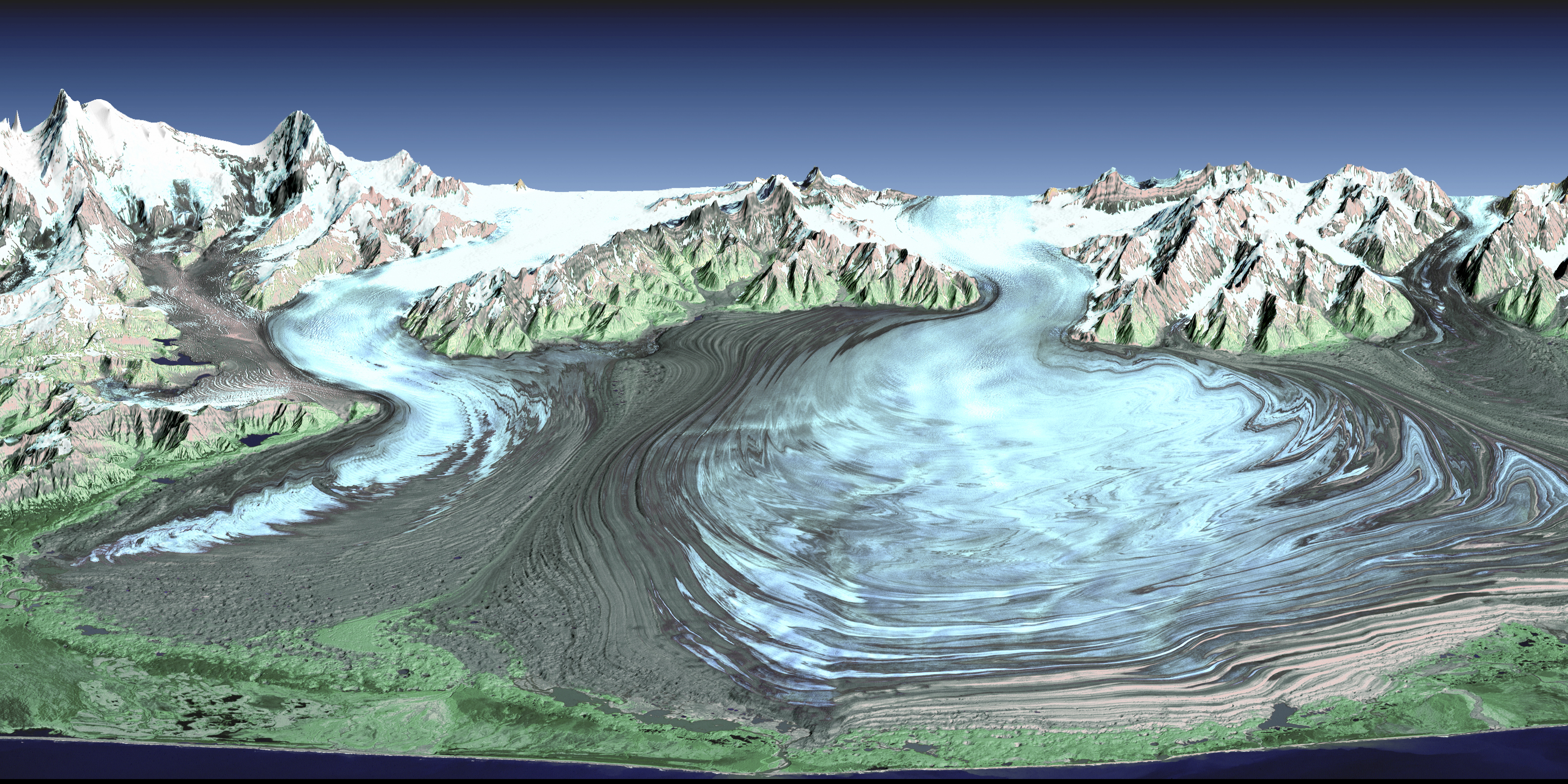
- Malaspina Glacier is a compound glacier, formed by the merger of several valley glaciers, the most prominent of which seen here are Agassiz Glacier (left) and Seward Glacier (right).

- Location within Alaska
- Interactive map of Agassiz Glacier
- Type: Valley glacier
- Location: Valdez-Cordova Census Area, Alaska, U.S.
- Coordinates: 60°11′00″N 140°48′00″W
- Length: 25 km (16 mi)
- Terminus: outwash plains
- Status: retreating

Agassiz Glacier is a valley glacier in the Saint Elias Mountains in southern Alaska (USA) and to a lesser extent on to Canadian territory.

The glacier was named by William Libbey, a member of The New York Times expedition in 1886, after Louis Agassiz (1807–1873), a Swiss-American naturalist.

== Geography ==
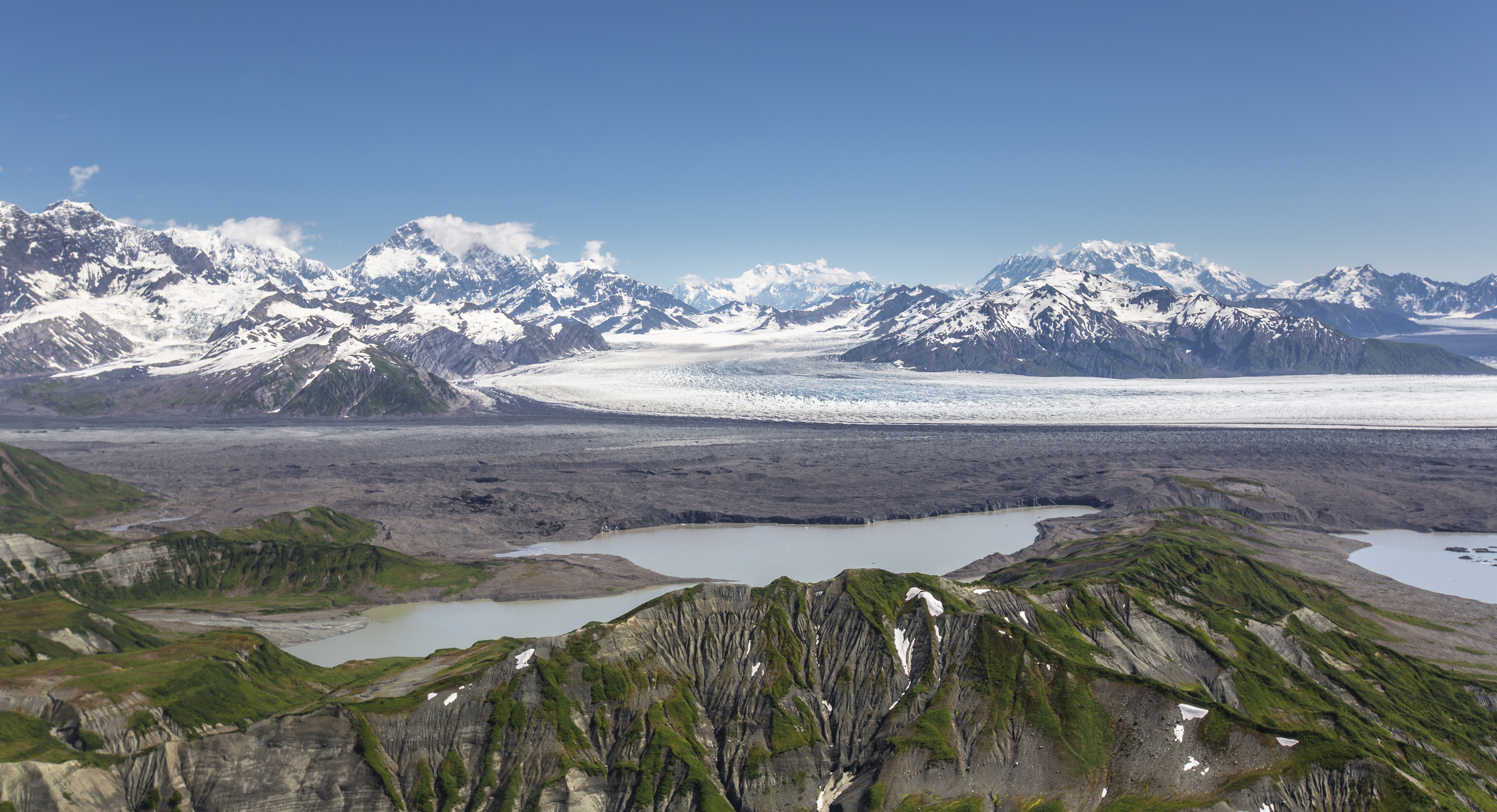
Agassiz Lakes near the confluence of Libbey Glacier and Agassiz Glacier.

The agglomeration of the Agassiz Glacier is located on the southern flank of Mount Malaspina north of the Canada–United States border. The 25 km long glacier is fed by the Newton Glacier. The three kilometres-wide glacier flows initially in a southwesterly direction, later in a south-easterly direction. From the west, the Libbey Glacier meets the Agassiz Glacier. This finally merges into the Malaspina Glacier, which finally flows into the Gulf of Alaska.

== See also ==
- List of glaciers
