= Mount Agassiz (Utah) =

Mountain in Duchesne and Summit counties in Utah, United States

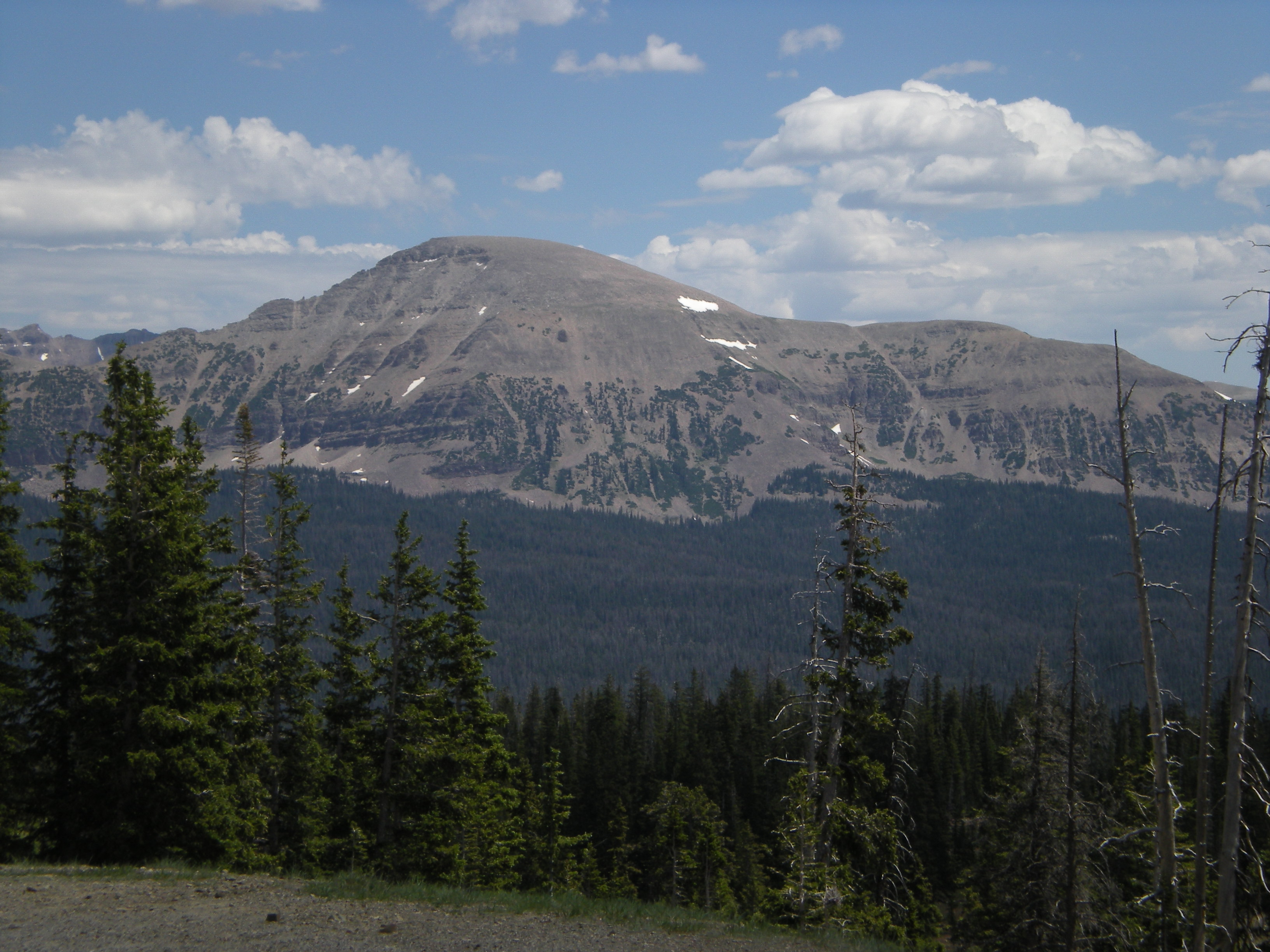
- West side of Mt. Agassiz

Highest point
- Elevation: 12,433 ft (3,790 m) NAVD 88
- Prominence: 1,018 ft (310 m)
- Coordinates: 40°42′40″N 110°49′25″W

Geography
- Location within Utah
- Location: Duchesne / Summit counties, Utah, U.S.
- Parent range: Uinta Mountains
- Topo map: USGS Hayden Peak

Mount Agassiz is a peak in the Uinta Mountains of northeastern Utah with an elevation of 12,433 feet (3,790 m). It is located in the High Uintas Wilderness and the Uinta-Wasatch-Cache National Forest. The summit is named in honor of Louis Agassiz, a well-known paleontologist, glaciologist and geologist.

== Climate ==
Climate data for Mount Agassiz 40.7107 N, 110.8239 W, Elevation: 12,041 ft (3,670 m) (1991–2020 normals)
Month	Jan	Feb	Mar	Apr	May	Jun	Jul	Aug	Sep	Oct	Nov	Dec	Year
Mean daily maximum °F (°C)	23.4 (−4.8)	23.6 (−4.7)	30.1 (−1.1)	35.6 (2.0)	43.8 (6.6)	54.7 (12.6)	62.5 (16.9)	60.9 (16.1)	53.0 (11.7)	41.3 (5.2)	29.6 (−1.3)	23.6 (−4.7)	40.2 (4.5)
Daily mean °F (°C)	13.8 (−10.1)	13.1 (−10.5)	18.4 (−7.6)	23.3 (−4.8)	31.8 (−0.1)	42.0 (5.6)	50.1 (10.1)	48.7 (9.3)	41.1 (5.1)	30.4 (−0.9)	20.0 (−6.7)	13.9 (−10.1)	28.9 (−1.7)
Mean daily minimum °F (°C)	4.2 (−15.4)	2.6 (−16.3)	6.7 (−14.1)	11.0 (−11.7)	19.7 (−6.8)	29.2 (−1.6)	37.6 (3.1)	36.5 (2.5)	29.3 (−1.5)	19.4 (−7.0)	10.4 (−12.0)	4.1 (−15.5)	17.6 (−8.0)
Average precipitation inches (mm)	4.93 (125)	4.62 (117)	4.41 (112)	4.53 (115)	3.89 (99)	2.53 (64)	2.00 (51)	2.07 (53)	3.09 (78)	3.80 (97)	3.78 (96)	4.43 (113)	44.08 (1,120)
Source: PRISM Climate Group
