= Homay-e Olya =

Homay-e Olya هماي عليا
- Village
- Location within Iran
- Coordinates: 38°30′29″N 46°24′36″E
- Country: Iran
- Province: East Azerbaijan
- County: Varzaqan
- Bakhsh: Central
- Rural District: Sina

Population (2006)
  - Total: 118

Homay-e Olya (Persian: هماي عليا, also Romanized as Homāy-e ‘Olyā; also known as Homāy Bālā, Homā-ye Bālā, Homāy-e Bālā, Homā-ye ‘Olyā, Umai, Ūmay, and Umay-Yukhari) is a village in Sina Rural District, in the Central District of Varzaqan County, East Azerbaijan Province, Iran. At the 2006 census, its population was 118, in 23 families.
