= Homa Sayar =

Iranian poet and writer (born 1947)

Homa Sayar (born 1947, in Tehran) is an Iranian poet and writer who has lived in Paris since 1975. She studied Psychology in the Université Sorbonne – Nouvelle and her PhD thesis on Avant-garde poetry in Persian literature at the Institut National des Langues et Civilisations Orientales.

She has written several poetry books in Persian and has also translated the famous Shahnameh (the Epic of Kings) into French. Ms Sayar has also worked as a teacher of Persian and has published a Persian learning method in English, German and French.

== Bibliography ==
- A l'eau, au feu, au vent, à la terre (to water, fire, air and earth). Editions l'Harmattan, 1997 ISBN 2-7384-5763-0.
  - 24 traditional Persian poems translated by the author in collaboration with Valérie.
- Contes de la mythologie persane (Tales from Persian mythology). Editions l'Harmattan, May 2000. ISBN 2-7384-3291-3
- Pour se perfectionner en persan (Improving your Persian) Editions l'Harmattan, September 2004. ISBN 2-7475-6946-2
