= Homa, Iran =

Village in Lorestan province, Iran

Homa Persian: هما
- Village
- Location within Iran
- Coordinates: 33°05′26″N 49°47′00″E
- Country: Iran
- Province: Lorestan
- County: Aligudarz
- District: Borborud-e Sharqi
- Rural District: Farsesh

Population (2016)
  - Total: 334
- Time zone: UTC+3:30 (IRST)

Homa (Persian: هما) (Note: Also romanized as Homā; also known as Huma, Hūmeh, Qal‘eh Huma, and Qal‘eh-ye Hūmeh) is a village in Farsesh Rural District of Borborud-e Sharqi District in Aligudarz County, Lorestan province, Iran.

== Demographics ==
=== Population ===
At the time of the 2006 National Census, the village's population was 451 in 80 households, when it was in the Central District. The following census in 2011 counted 395 people in 92 households. The 2016 census measured the population of the village as 334 people in 97 households, by which time the rural district had been separated from the district in the formation of Borborud-e Sharqi District.
