= Gohreh Rural District =

Rural district in Hormozgan province, Iran

Gohreh Rural District Persian: دهستان گهره
- Rural District
- Location within Iran
- Coordinates: 27°45′59″N 55°58′56″E
- Country: Iran
- Province: Hormozgan
- County: Bandar Abbas
- District: Fin
- Capital: Qotbabad-e Gohreh

Population (2016)
  - Total: 2,005
- Time zone: UTC+3:30 (IRST)

Gohreh Rural District (Persian: دهستان گهره) is in Fin District of Bandar Abbas County, Hormozgan province, Iran. Its capital is the village of Qotbabad-e Gohreh.

== Demographics ==
=== Population ===
At the time of the 2006 National Census, the rural district's population was 2,363 in 569 households. There were 1,899 inhabitants in 556 households at the following census of 2011. The 2016 census measured the population of the rural district as 2,005 in 651 households. The most populous of its 31 villages was Qotbabad-e Gohreh, with 522 people.
