= Fin Rural District =

Rural district in Hormozgan province, Iran

Fin Rural District Persian: دهستان فین
- Rural District
- Location within Iran
- Coordinates: 27°34′40″N 55°48′00″E
- Country: Iran
- Province: Hormozgan
- County: Bandar Abbas
- District: Fin
- Capital: Fin

Population (2016)
  - Total: 10,415
- Time zone: UTC+3:30 (IRST)

Fin Rural District (Persian: دهستان فین) is in Fin District of Bandar Abbas County, Hormozgan province, Iran. It is administered from the city of Fin. The rural district is home to the centuries-old Fin Castle.

== Demographics ==
=== Population ===
At the time of the 2006 National Census, the rural district's population was 9,277 in 2,065 households. There were 9,865 inhabitants in 2,578 households at the following census of 2011. The 2016 census measured the population of the rural district as 10,415 in 2,951 households. The most populous of its 68 villages was Rezvan, with 5,066 people.
