= Siyahu Rural District =

Rural district in Hormozgan province, Iran

Siyahu Rural District Persian: دهستان سياهو
- Rural District
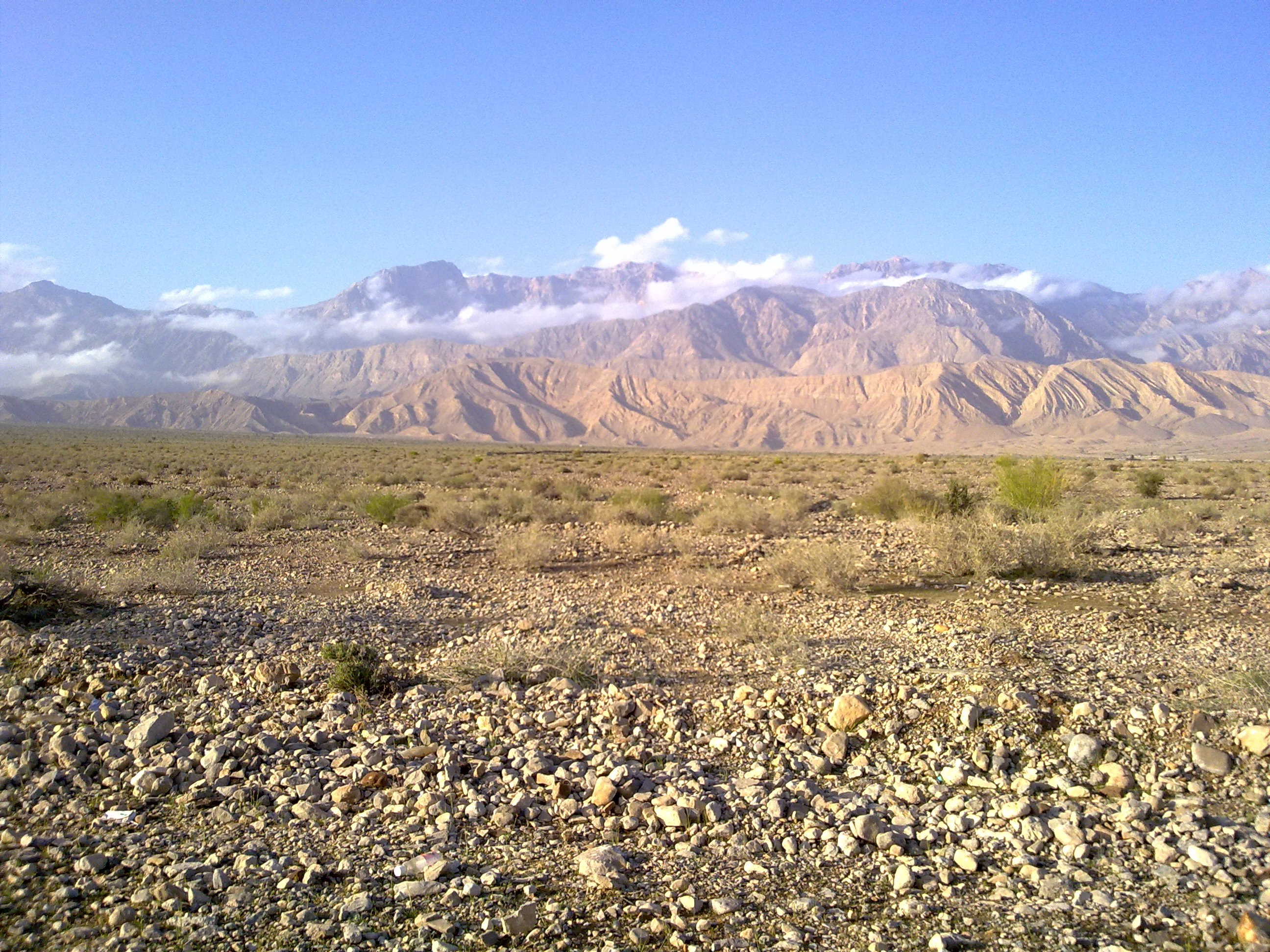

- Location within Iran
- Coordinates: 27°48′43″N 56°22′06″E
- Country: Iran
- Province: Hormozgan
- County: Bandar Abbas
- District: Central
- Capital: Siyahu

Population (2016)
  - Total: 8,927
- Time zone: UTC+3:30 (IRST)

Siyahu Rural District (Persian: دهستان سياهو) is in the Central District of Bandar Abbas County, Hormozgan province, Iran. Its capital is the village of Siyahu.

== Demographics ==
=== Population ===
At the time of the 2006 National Census, the rural district's population (as a part of Fin District) was 8,342 in 2,215 households. There were 10,184 inhabitants in 3,019 households at the following census of 2011, by which time the rural district had been transferred to the Central District. The 2016 census measured the population of the rural district as 8,927 in 2,905 households. The most populous of its 61 villages was Siyahu, with 1,015 people.
