= Fin District =

District in Hormozgan province, Iran

Fin District Persian: بخش فین
- District
- Location within Iran
- Coordinates: 27°39′30″N 55°48′00″E
- Country: Iran
- Province: Hormozgan
- County: Bandar Abbas
- Capital: Fin

Population (2016)
  - Total: 16,359
- Time zone: UTC+3:30 (IRST)

Fin District (Persian: بخش فین) is in Bandar Abbas County, Hormozgan province, Iran. Its capital is the city of Fin.

== History ==
After the 2006 National Census, Siyahu Rural District was transferred to the Central District.

== Demographics ==
=== Population ===
At the time of the 2006 census, the district's population was 23,514 in 5,709 households. The following census in 2011 counted 17,043 people in 4,459 households. The 2016 census measured the population of the district as 16,359 inhabitants in 4,763 households.

=== Administrative divisions ===
Fin District Population
Administrative Divisions	2006	2011	2016
Fin RD	9,277	9,865	10,415
Gohreh RD	2,363	1,899	2,005
Siyahu RD (Note: Transferred to the Central District)	8,342		
Fin (city)	3,532	5,279	3,939
Total	23,514	17,043	16,359
RD = Rural District
