= Sarzeh =

Sarzeh or Sar Zeh (Persian: سرزه) may refer to:

- Sarzeh, Bandar Abbas, Hormozgan province
- Sarzeh, Bashagard, Hormozgan province
- Sarzeh, Sirik, Hormozgan province
- Sar Zeh, Rudan, Hormozgan province
- Sarzeh Al-e Mehtarian, Hormozgan province
- Sarzeh Kharuk, Hormozgan province
- Sarzeh Posht Band, Hormozgan province
- Sarzeh Shamil, Hormozgan province
- Sarzeh-ye Charkan, Hormozgan province
- Sarzeh, Bardsir, Kerman province
- Sarzeh, Rigan, Kerman province
- Sarzeh, Zarand, Kerman province
- Sarzeh, Iranshahr, Sistan and Baluchestan province
- Sarzeh, South Khorasan
- Sar Zeh-ye Sofla (disambiguation)
