= Sarkam =

Sarkam or Sarkom or Sar Kom (Persian: سركم) may refer to:

- Sarkam, Fin, Bandar Abbas County, Hormozgan Province
- Sarkam, Takht, Bandar Abbas County, Hormozgan Province
- Sarkam, Minab, Hormozgan Province
- Sarkom, Rudan, Hormozgan Province
- Sarkam, Sistan and Baluchestan
