= Zamin Sang =

Zamin Sang زمين سنگ
- Village
- Location within Iran
- Coordinates: 27°26′54″N 56°51′37″E
- Country: Iran
- Province: Hormozgan
- County: Bandar Abbas
- Bakhsh: Shamil
- Rural District: Hasanlangi rural district

Population (2006)
  - Total: 1,551
- Time zone: UTC+3:30 (IRST)
  - Summer (DST): UTC+4:30 (IRDT)

Zamin Sang (Persian: زمين سنگ, romanized: Zamīn Sang) is a village in Hasanlangi Rural District, Shamil District, Bandar Abbas County, Hormozgan Province, Iran. At the 2006 census, its population was 1,551, in 314 families.
