= Gazriz =

Gazriz گزريز
- Village
- Location within Iran
- Coordinates: 27°14′52″N 56°43′46″E
- Country: Iran
- Province: Hormozgan
- County: Bandar Abbas
- Bakhsh: Takht
- Rural District: Shamil

Population (2006)
  - Total: 166
- Time zone: UTC+3:30 (IRST)
  - Summer (DST): UTC+4:30 (IRDT)

Gazriz (Persian: گزريز, also Romanized as Gazrīz) is a village in Shamil Rural District, Takht District, Bandar Abbas County, Hormozgan Province, Iran. At the 2006 census, its population was 166, in 35 families.
