= Lardu =

Lardu لردو
- Village
- Location within Iran
- Coordinates: 27°21′00″N 56°39′36″E
- Country: Iran
- Province: Hormozgan
- County: Bandar Abbas
- Bakhsh: Takht
- Rural District: Takht

Population (2006)
  - Total: 128
- Time zone: UTC+3:30 (IRST)
  - Summer (DST): UTC+4:30 (IRDT)

Lardu (Persian: لردو, also Romanized as Lardū) is a village in Takht Rural District, Takht District, Bandar Abbas County, Hormozgan Province, Iran. At the 2006 census, its population was 128, in 25 families.
