= Sarkha-ye Pain =

Sarkha-ye Pain سرخاپائين
- Village
- Location within Iran
- Coordinates: 27°34′25″N 56°36′25″E
- Country: Iran
- Province: Hormozgan
- County: Bandar Abbas
- Bakhsh: Takht
- Rural District: Takht

Population (2006)
  - Total: 123
- Time zone: UTC+3:30 (IRST)
  - Summer (DST): UTC+4:30 (IRDT)

Sarkha-ye Pain (Persian: سرخاپائين, also Romanized as Sarkhā-ye Pā’īn) is a village in Takht Rural District, Takht District, Bandar Abbas County, Hormozgan Province, Iran. At the 2006 census, its population was 123, in 25 families.
