= Sorkhangi =

Sorkhangi سرخنگي
- Village
- Location within Iran
- Coordinates: 27°28′47″N 56°52′27″E
- Country: Iran
- Province: Hormozgan
- County: Bandar Abbas
- Bakhsh: Takht
- Rural District: Shamil

Population (2006)
  - Total: 1,190
- Time zone: UTC+3:30 (IRST)
  - Summer (DST): UTC+4:30 (IRDT)

Sorkhangi (Persian: سرخنگي, also Romanized as Sorkhangī; also known as Sorkhang) is a village in Shamil Rural District, Takht District, Bandar Abbas County, Hormozgan Province, Iran. At the 2006 census, its population was 1,190, in 228 families.
