= Delbudani =

Delbudani دل بودني
- Village
- Location within Iran
- Coordinates: 27°18′15″N 56°45′13″E
- Country: Iran
- Province: Hormozgan
- County: Bandar Abbas
- Bakhsh: Takht
- Rural District: Shamil

Population (2006)
  - Total: 253
- Time zone: UTC+3:30 (IRST)
  - Summer (DST): UTC+4:30 (IRDT)

Delbudani (Persian: دل بودني, also Romanized as Delbūdanī) is a village in Shamil Rural District, Takht District, Bandar Abbas County, Hormozgan Province, Iran. At the 2006 census, its population was 253, in 57 families.
