= Kuh Lahru =

Kuh Lahru كوه لهرو
- Village
- Location within Iran
- Coordinates: 27°37′00″N 56°50′08″E
- Country: Iran
- Province: Hormozgan
- County: Bandar Abbas
- Bakhsh: shamil
- Rural District: Shamil

Population (2006)
  - Total: 161
- Time zone: UTC+3:30 (IRST)
  - Summer (DST): UTC+4:30 (IRDT)

Kuh Lahru (Persian: كوه لهرو, also Romanized as Kūh Lahrū) is a village in

Poshtkuh-e Shamil,

at Shamil Rural District, 

Shamil District, Bandar Abbas County, Hormozgan Province, Iran. At the 2006 census, its population was 161, in 39 families. Kuh lahru means Kuh (mountain) in Persian And lahru or lahro (home) in garmsiri language.
