= Kadukar =

Kadukar كدوكار
- Village
- Location within Iran
- Coordinates: 27°17′17″N 56°45′10″E
- Country: Iran
- Province: Hormozgan
- County: Bandar Abbas
- Bakhsh: Takht
- Rural District: Shamil

Population (2006)
  - Total: 190
- Time zone: UTC+3:30 (IRST)
  - Summer (DST): UTC+4:30 (IRDT)

Kadukar (Persian: كدوكار, also Romanized as Kadūkār; also known as Kūdūkār) is a village in Shamil Rural District, Takht District, Bandar Abbas County, Hormozgan Province, Iran. At the 2006 census, its population was 190, in 47 families.
