= Kuh Dazan =

Kuh Dazan كوه دازان
- Village
- Location within Iran
- Coordinates: 27°38′15″N 56°48′49″E
- Country: Iran
- Province: Hormozgan
- County: Bandar Abbas
- Bakhsh: shamil
- Rural District: Shamil

Population (2006)
  - Total: 253
- Time zone: UTC+3:30 (IRST)
  - Summer (DST): UTC+4:30 (IRDT)

Kuh Dazan (Persian: كوه دازان, also Romanized as Kūh Dāzān) is a village in poshtkuh shamil پشتکوه شمیل at Shamil Rural District, shamil District, Bandar Abbas County, Hormozgan province, Iran. At the 2006 census, its population was 253, in 56 families.
