= Kohur Kalaghi =

Kohur Kalaghi كهوركلاغي
- Village
- Location within Iran
- Coordinates: 27°23′20″N 56°42′03″E
- Country: Iran
- Province: Hormozgan
- County: Bandar Abbas
- Bakhsh: Takht
- Rural District: Takht

Population (2006)
  - Total: 244
- Time zone: UTC+3:30 (IRST)
  - Summer (DST): UTC+4:30 (IRDT)

Kohur Kalaghi (Persian: كهوركلاغي, also Romanized as Kohūr Kalāghī) is a village in Takht Rural District, Takht District, Bandar Abbas County, Hormozgan Province, Iran. At the 2006 census, its population was 244, in 54 families.
