= Zanhi =

Zanhi زنهي
- Village
- Location within Iran
- Coordinates: 27°37′53″N 56°46′18″E
- Country: Iran
- Province: Hormozgan
- County: Bandar Abbas
- Bakhsh: shamil District
- Rural District: Shamil

Population (2006)
  - Total: 42
- Time zone: UTC+3:30 (IRST)
  - Summer (DST): UTC+4:30 (IRDT)

Zanhi (Persian: زنهي, also Romanized as Zanhī) is a village in Poshtkuh-e Shamil at Shamil Rural District, shamil District, Bandar Abbas County, Hormozgan Province, Iran. At the 2006 census, its population was 42, in 12 families.
