= Sikhuran =

Sikhuran or Sikhvoran or Sikhowran or Si Khvoran (Persian: سيخوران), also rendered as Sikhoran, also known as:

- Sikhuran, Hormozgan
- Si Khvoran-e Bala, Hormozgan Province
- Sikhvoran, Kerman
