= Samselu =

Samselu سمسلو
- Village
- Location within Iran
- Coordinates: 27°27′26″N 56°58′06″E
- Country: Iran
- Province: Hormozgan
- County: Bandar Abbas
- Bakhsh: Takht
- Rural District: Shamil

Population (2006)
  - Total: 356
- Time zone: UTC+3:30 (IRST)
  - Summer (DST): UTC+4:30 (IRDT)

Samselu (Persian: سمسلو, also Romanized as Samselū; also known as Samsūleh and Samsūlū) is a village in Shamil Rural District, Takht District, Bandar Abbas County, Hormozgan Province, Iran. At the 2006 census, its population was 356, in 70 families.
