= Ab Pish =

Ab Pish اب پيش
- Village
- Location within Iran
- Coordinates: 27°27′35″N 56°41′08″E
- Country: Iran
- Province: Hormozgan
- County: Bandar Abbas
- Bakhsh: Takht
- Rural District: Takht

Population (2006)
  - Total: 67
- Time zone: UTC+3:30 (IRST)
  - Summer (DST): UTC+4:30 (IRDT)

Ab Pish (Persian: اب پيش, also Romanized as Āb Pīsh) is a village in Takht Rural District, Takht District, Bandar Abbas County, Hormozgan province, Iran. At the 2006 census, its population was 67, in 19 families.
