= Kal-e Zorat =

Kal-e Zorat كل ذرت
- Village
- Location within Iran
- Coordinates: 27°24′26″N 56°46′56″E
- Country: Iran
- Province: Hormozgan
- County: Bandar Abbas
- Bakhsh: Takht
- Rural District: Shamil

Population (2006)
  - Total: 378
- Time zone: UTC+3:30 (IRST)
  - Summer (DST): UTC+4:30 (IRDT)

Kal-e Zorat (Persian: كل ذرت, also Romanized as Kal-e Z̄orat and Kal Zorrat) is a village in Shamil Rural District, Takht District, Bandar Abbas County, Hormozgan Province, Iran. At the 2006 census, its population was 378, in 92 families.
