= Dar Tujan =

Dar Tujan درتوجان
- Village
- Location within Iran
- Coordinates: 27°22′39″N 56°46′47″E
- Country: Iran
- Province: Hormozgan
- County: Bandar Abbas
- Bakhsh: Takht
- Rural District: Shamil

Population (2006)
  - Total: 213
- Time zone: UTC+3:30 (IRST)
  - Summer (DST): UTC+4:30 (IRDT)

Dar Tujan (Persian: درتوجان, also Romanized as Dar Tūjān) is a village in Shamil Rural District, Takht District, Bandar Abbas County, Hormozgan Province, Iran. At the 2006 census, its population was 213, in 67 families.
