= Zorrati, Hormozgan =

Zorrati ذرتي
- Village
- Location within Iran
- Coordinates: 27°13′04″N 56°43′21″E
- Country: Iran
- Province: Hormozgan
- County: Bandar Abbas
- Bakhsh: Takht
- Rural District: Shamil

Population (2006)
  - Total: 100
- Time zone: UTC+3:30 (IRST)
  - Summer (DST): UTC+4:30 (IRDT)

Zorrati (Persian: ذرتي, also Romanized as Z̄orratī) is a village in Shamil Rural District, Takht District, Bandar Abbas County, Hormozgan Province, Iran. At the 2006 census, its population was 100, in 20 families.
