= Chah Kharg =

Chah Kharg چاه خرگ
- Village
- Location within Iran
- Coordinates: 27°25′52″N 56°53′15″E
- Country: Iran
- Province: Hormozgan
- County: Bandar Abbas
- Bakhsh: Shamil District
- Rural District: Hasanlangi Rural District

Population (2006)
  - Total: 514
- Time zone: UTC+3:30 (IRST)
  - Summer (DST): UTC+4:30 (IRDT)

Chah Kharg (Persian: چاه خرگ, also Romanized as Chāh Kharg) is a village in Hasanlangi Rural District,

Shamil District, Bandar Abbas County, Hormozgan Province, Iran. At the 2006 census, its population was 514, in 109 families.[2]
