= Baluli =

Baluli بالولي
- Village
- Location within Iran
- Coordinates: 27°28′54″N 56°49′59″E
- Country: Iran
- Province: Hormozgan
- County: Bandar Abbas
- Bakhsh: Takht
- Rural District: Shamil

Population (2006)
  - Total: 583
- Time zone: UTC+3:30 (IRST)
  - Summer (DST): UTC+4:30 (IRDT)

Baluli (Persian: بالولي, also Romanized as Bālūlī and Balooli; also known as Bāgh Lūlī) is a village in the Shamil Rural District, Takht District, Bandar Abbas County, Hormozgan Province, Iran. At the 2006 census, its population was 583, in 120 families.
