= Posht-e Kuh, Hormozgan =

PoshtKuh پَُشتكوه
- Village
- Location within Iran
- Coordinates: 27°21′28″N 56°43′26″E
- Country: Iran
- Province: Hormozgan
- County: Bandar Abbas
- Bakhsh: Takht
- Rural District: jallabi Rural District

Population (2006)
  - Total: 477
- Time zone: UTC+3:30 (IRST)
  - Summer (DST): UTC+4:30 (IRDT)

PoshtKuh (Persian: پُشتكوه, also Romanized as Posht Kūh, Posht Kooh, Posht Kūh, and Poshtkūh) is a village in jallabi Rural District, Takht District, Bandar Abbas County, Hormozgan Province, Iran. At the 2006 census, its population was 477, in 103 families.
