= Bohregh =

Bohregh بهرغ
- Village
- Location within Iran
- Coordinates: 27°32′27″N 56°42′33″E
- Country: Iran
- Province: Hormozgan
- County: Bandar Abbas
- Bakhsh: Takht
- Rural District: Takht

Population (2006)
  - Total: 124
- Time zone: UTC+3:30 (IRST)
  - Summer (DST): UTC+4:30 (IRDT)

Bohregh (Persian: بهرغ, also Romanized as Bohrogh; also known as Behrogh-e Takht and Bohregh-e Takht) is a village in Takht Rural District, Takht District, Bandar Abbas County, Hormozgan Province, Iran. At the 2006 census, its population was 124, in 36 families.
