= Sohrabi =

Sohrabi (سهرابی(سرزه آلمهتران
- Village
- Location within Iran
- Coordinates: 27°27′17″N 56°52′56″E
- Country: Iran
- Province: Hormozgan
- County: Bandar Abbas
- Bakhsh: Shamil District
- Rural District: Hasanlangi Rural District

Population (2006)
  - Total: 122
- Time zone: UTC+3:30 (IRST)
  - Summer (DST): UTC+4:30 (IRDT)

Sohrabi (Persian: سهرابي, also Romanized as Sohrābī) is a village in Hasanlangi Rural District, Shamil District, Bandar Abbas County, Hormozgan Province, Iran. At the 2006 census, its population was 122, in 25 families.
