= Mahmud Kolahi =

Mahmud Kolahi محمودكلاهي
- Village
- Location within Iran
- Coordinates: 27°21′55″N 56°40′22″E
- Country: Iran
- Province: Hormozgan
- County: Bandar Abbas
- Bakhsh: Takht
- Rural District: Takht

Population (2006)
  - Total: 195
- Time zone: UTC+3:30 (IRST)
  - Summer (DST): UTC+4:30 (IRDT)

Mahmud Kolahi (Persian: محمودكلاهي, also Romanized as Maḩmūd Kolāhī; also known as Maḩmūd Kalāghī) is a village in Takht Rural District, Takht District, Bandar Abbas County, Hormozgan Province, Iran. At the 2006 census, its population was 195, in 38 families.
