= Hasan Langi =

Hasan Langi (Persian: حسن لنگي) may refer to:

- Hasan Langi-ye Bala
- Hasan Langi-ye Pain
- Hasan Langi Rural District, an administrative division of Bandar Abbas County, Hormozgan province, Iran
