= Shah Bazan =

Shah Bazan شاه بازان
- Village
- Location within Iran
- Coordinates: 27°24′29″N 56°47′45″E
- Country: Iran
- Province: Hormozgan
- County: Bandar Abbas
- Bakhsh: Takht
- Rural District: Shamil

Population (2006)
  - Total: 186
- Time zone: UTC+3:30 (IRST)
  - Summer (DST): UTC+4:30 (IRDT)

Shah Bazan (Persian: شاه بازان, also Romanized as Shāh Bāzān and Shāhbāzān) is a village in Shamil Rural District, Takht District, Bandar Abbas County, Hormozgan Province, Iran. At the 2006 census, its population was 186, in 49 families.
