= Chah Pas =

Chah Pas چاه پس
- Village
- Location within Iran
- Coordinates: 27°25′07″N 56°46′06″E
- Country: Iran
- Province: Hormozgan
- County: Bandar Abbas
- Bakhsh: Takht
- Rural District: Shamil

Population (2006)
  - Total: 235
- Time zone: UTC+3:30 (IRST)
  - Summer (DST): UTC+4:30 (IRDT)

Chah Pas (Persian: چاه پس, also Romanized as Chāh Pas; also known as Chāh Paz) is a village in Shamil Rural District, Takht District, Bandar Abbas County, Hormozgan Province, Iran. At the 2006 census, its population was 235, in 51 families.
