= Sarzeh Kharuk =

Sarzeh Kharuk سرزه خاروك
- Village
- Location within Iran
- Coordinates: 27°28′31″N 56°57′09″E
- Country: Iran
- Province: Hormozgan
- County: Bandar Abbas
- Bakhsh: Shamil District
- Rural District: Shamil

Population (2006)
  - Total: 903
- Time zone: UTC+3:30 (IRST)
  - Summer (DST): UTC+4:30 (IRDT)

Sarzeh Kharuk (Persian: سرزه خاروك, also Romanized as Sarzeh Khārūk; also known as Sarzeh and Sarzeh Bālā) is a village in Hasanlangi Rural District, Shamil District, Bandar Abbas County, Hormozgan Province, Iran. At the 2006 census, its population was 903, in 194 families.
