= Chahestan =

Village in Hormozgan province, Iran

Chahestan Persian: چاهستان
- Village
- Location within Iran
- Coordinates: 27°30′50″N 56°43′01″E
- Country: Iran
- Province: Hormozgan
- County: Bandar Abbas
- District: Takht
- Rural District: Takht

Population (2016)
  - Total: 1,693
- Time zone: UTC+3:30 (IRST)

Chahestan (Persian: چاهستان) (Note: Also romanized as Chāhestān; also known as Chāhistān and Shāhestān) is a village in Takht Rural District of Takht District, Bandar Abbas County, Hormozgan province, Iran.

== Demographics ==
=== Population ===
At the time of the 2006 National Census, the village's population was 1,191 in 293 households. The following census in 2011 counted 1,417 people in 394 households. The 2016 census measured the village population as 1,693 people in 495 households. It was the most populous village in its rural district.
