= Hasan Langi-ye Pain =

Hasan Langi-ye Payin حسن لنگي پائين
- Village
- Location within Iran
- Coordinates: 27°21′42″N 56°51′27″E
- Country: Iran
- Province: Hormozgan
- County: Bandar Abbas
- Bakhsh: Shamil District
- Rural District: Hasanlangi rural District

Population (2006)
  - Total: 888
- Time zone: UTC+3:30 (IRST)
  - Summer (DST): UTC+4:30 (IRDT)

Hasan Langi-ye Pain (Persian: حسن لنگي پائين, also Romanized as hasan Langī-ye Payīn; also known as hasan Langī) is a village in Shamil District, Bandar Abbas County, Hormozgan Province, Iran. At the 2006 census, its population was 888, in 186 families.
