= Shamil, Hormozgan =

Village in Hormozgan province, Iran

Shamil Persian: شمیل
- Village
- Location within Iran
- Coordinates: 27°30′03″N 56°51′53″E
- Country: Iran
- Province: Hormozgan
- County: Bandar Abbas
- District: Shamil
- Rural District: Shamil

Population (2016)
  - Total: 1,455
- Time zone: UTC+3:30 (IRST)

Shamil (Persian: شمیل) (Note: Also romanized as Shamīl) is a city in Shamil Rural District of Shamil District, Bandar Abbas County, Hormozgan province, Iran, serving as capital of both the district and the rural district.

== Demographics ==
=== Population ===
At the time of the 2006 National Census, the village's population was 1,548 in 358 households, when it was in Takht District. The following census in 2011 counted 1,891 people in 474 households. The 2016 census measured the population of the village as 1,455 people in 436 households.

After the census, the rural district was separated from the district in the formation of Shamil District.
