= Gav Mordeh =

Gav Mordeh (Persian: گاومرده) may refer to:

- Gav Mordeh, Hormozgan
- Gav Mordeh, Kerman
