= Gazshahne =

Gazshahne گزشهنه
- Village
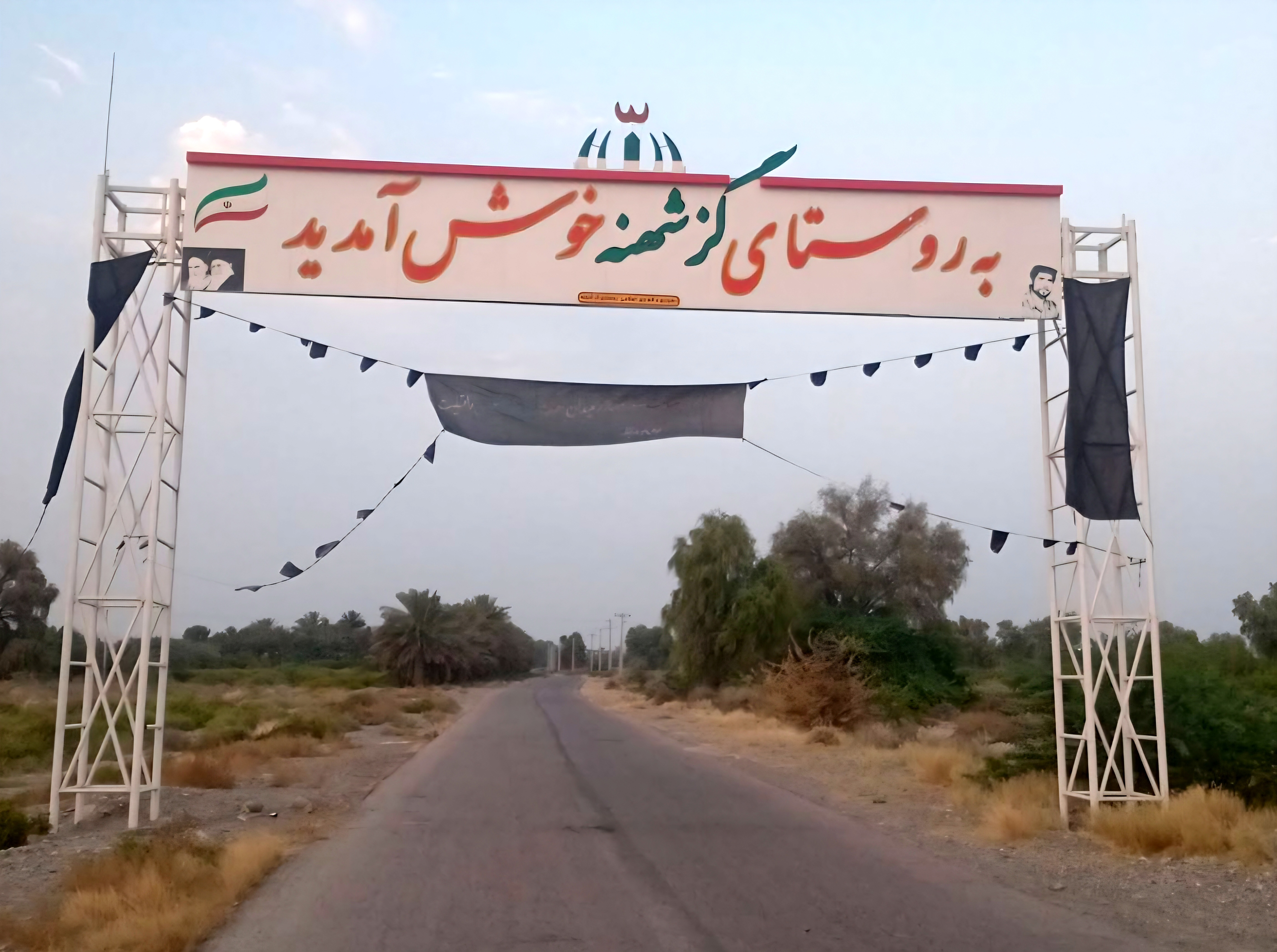

- Location within Iran
- Coordinates: 27°29′04″N 56°48′40″E
- Country: Iran
- Province: Hormozgan
- County: Bandar Abbas
- Bakhsh: Shamil
- Rural District: Shamil

Population (2011)
  - Total: 497
- Time zone: UTC+3:30 (IRST)
  - Summer (DST): UTC+4:30 (IRDT)

Gazshahne (Persian: گزشهنه) is a village in Shamil Rural District, Shamil District, Bandar Abbas County, Hormozgan Province, Iran. At the 2006 census, its population was 379, in 84 families.
