= Pa Qalatan-e Bala =

Pa Qalatan-e Bala پاقلاتان بالا
- Village
- Location within Iran
- Coordinates: 27°23′46″N 56°46′12″E
- Country: Iran
- Province: Hormozgan
- County: Bandar Abbas
- Bakhsh: Takht
- Rural District: Shamil

Population (2006)
  - Total: 467
- Time zone: UTC+3:30 (IRST)
  - Summer (DST): UTC+4:30 (IRDT)

Pa Qalatan-e Bala (Persian: پاقلاتان بالا, also Romanized as Pā Qalātūn-e Bālā) is a village in Shamil Rural District, Takht District, Bandar Abbas County, Hormozgan Province, Iran. At the 2006 census, its population was 467, in 109 families.
