= Gav Mordeh, Hormozgan =

Gav Mordeh گاومرده
- Village
- Location within Iran
- Coordinates: 27°18′14″N 56°47′39″E
- Country: Iran
- Province: Hormozgan
- County: Bandar Abbas
- Bakhsh: Takht
- Rural District: Shamil

Population (2006)
  - Total: 333
- Time zone: UTC+3:30 (IRST)
  - Summer (DST): UTC+4:30 (IRDT)

Gav Mordeh (Persian: گاومرده, also Romanized as Gāv Mordeh; also known as Gār Sardeh) is a village in Shamil Rural District, Takht District, Bandar Abbas County, Hormozgan Province, Iran. At the 2006 census, its population was 333, in 70 families.
