= Zohuki, Bandar Abbas =

Zohuki زهوكي
- Village
- Location within Iran
- Coordinates: 27°29′29″N 56°46′27″E
- Country: Iran
- Province: Hormozgan
- County: Bandar Abbas
- Bakhsh: Takht
- Rural District: Shamil

Population (2006)
  - Total: 237
- Time zone: UTC+3:30 (IRST)
  - Summer (DST): UTC+4:30 (IRDT)

Zohuki (Persian: زهوكي, also Romanized as Zohūkī, Zahooki, and Zehūkī) is a village in Shamil Rural District, Takht District, Bandar Abbas County, Hormozgan Province, Iran. At the 2006 census, its population was 237, in 54 families.
