= Golman =

Golman may refer to:

- Golman, Bangladesh, a village
- Golman Pierre (born 1971), Haitian former footballer
- Ab Golman, Hormozgan, Iran, a village
