= Sarzeh Al-e Mehtarian =

Sarzeh Al-e Mehtaran سرزه ال مهتران
- Village
- Location within Iran
- Coordinates: 27°27′23″N 56°53′39″E
- Country: Iran
- Province: Hormozgan
- County: Bandar Abbas
- Bakhsh: Shamil District
- Rural District: Hasanlangi Rural District

Population (2006)
  - Total: 487
- Time zone: UTC+3:30 (IRST)
  - Summer (DST): UTC+4:30 (IRDT)

Sarzeh Al-e Mehtarian (Persian: سرزه ال مهتران, also Romanized as Sarzeh Āl-e Mehtarān; also known as Sarzeh Ālmehtarī) is a village in Hasanlangi Rural District, Shamil District, Bandar Abbas County, Hormozgan Province, Iran. At the 2006 census, its population was 487, in 100 families.
