= Jalabi, Iran =

Village in Hormozgan province, Iran

Jalabi Persian: جلابي
- Village
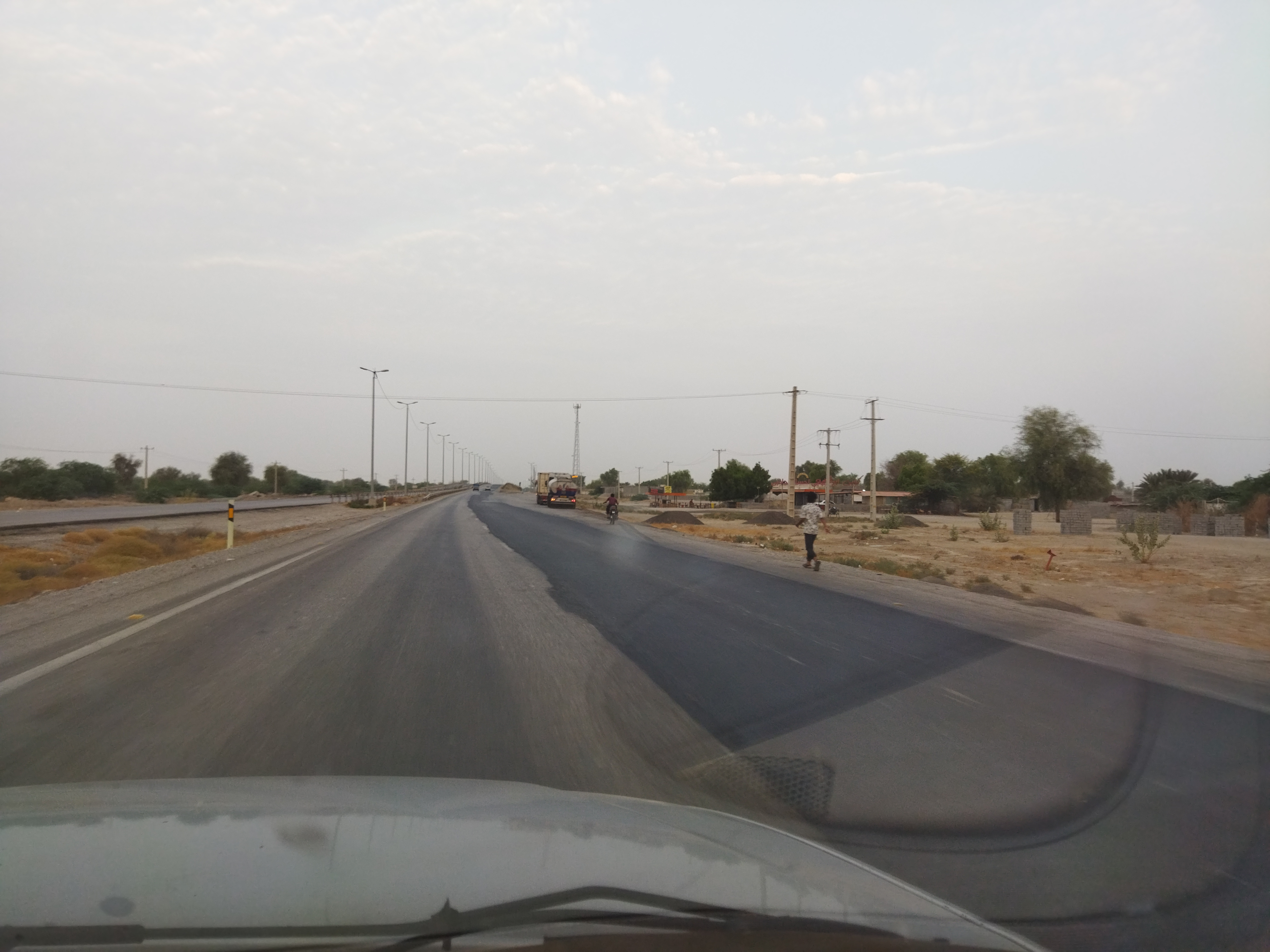
- Jalabi, Takht District, Bandar Abbas County, Hormozgan province, Iran

- Location within Iran
- Coordinates: 27°21′54″N 56°40′33″E
- Country: Iran
- Province: Hormozgan
- County: Bandar Abbas
- District: Takht
- Rural District: Jalabi

Population (2016)
  - Total: 669
- Time zone: UTC+3:30 (IRST)

Jalabi (Persian: جلابي) (Note: Also romanized as Jalābī or Jallābī; also known as Jalā’ and Jullāb) is a village in, and the capital of, Jalabi Rural District of Takht District, Bandar Abbas County, Hormozgan province, Iran.

== Demographics ==
=== Population ===
At the time of the 2006 National Census, the village's population was 408 in 79 households, when it was in Takht Rural District. The following census in 2011 counted 721 people in 181 households. The 2016 census measured the population of the village as 669 people in 183 households.

After the census, the village was transferred to Jalabi Rural District created in the district.
