= Sarzeh Shamil =

Sarzeh Shamil سرزه شميل
- Village
- Location within Iran
- Coordinates: 27°30′28″N 56°56′18″E
- Country: Iran
- Province: Hormozgan
- County: Bandar Abbas
- Bakhsh: Takht
- Rural District: Shamil

Population (2006)
  - Total: 486
- Time zone: UTC+3:30 (IRST)
  - Summer (DST): UTC+4:30 (IRDT)

Sarzeh Shamil (Persian: سرزه شميل, also Romanized as Sarzeh Shamīl) is a village in Shamil Rural District, Takht District, Bandar Abbas County, Hormozgan Province, Iran. At the 2006 census, its population was 486, in 98 families.
