= Jalabe =

Jalabe or Jalabi may refer to:

- Ahmad Chalabi, sometimes transcribed as Ahmad al-Jalabi (1944–2015), Iraqi politician
- Ahmad Effendi Jalabi mayor of Haifa in 1878–1881
- Mariam Jalabi, Syrian feminist and activist
- Jalabe people of Nigeria, who speak the Jalaa language
- Jalabi, Iran
- Jalabi Rural District, an administrative division of Bandar Abbas County, Hormozgan province, Iran
- Jalebi, a sweet popular in countries of South Asia, the West Asia, North Africa
