= Hasan Langi-ye Bala =

Village in Hormozgan province, Iran

Hasan Langi-ye Bala Persian: حسن لنگي بالا
- Village
- Location within Iran
- Coordinates: 27°23′05″N 56°51′53″E
- Country: Iran
- Province: Hormozgan
- County: Bandar Abbas
- District: Shamil
- Rural District: Hasan Langi

Population (2016)
  - Total: 1,943
- Time zone: UTC+3:30 (IRST)

Hasan Langi-ye Bala (Persian: حسن لنگي بالا) (Note: Also romanized as Ḩasan Langī-ye Bālā; also known as Gazakī-ye Ḩasanlangī) is a village in, and the capital of, Hasan Langi Rural District of Shamil District, Bandar Abbas County, Hormozgan province, Iran.

== Demographics ==
=== Population ===
At the time of the 2006 National Census, the village's population was 1,739 in 375 households, when it was in Shamil Rural District of Takht District. The following census in 2011 counted 1,914 people in 469 households. The 2016 census measured the population of the village as 1,943 people in 538 households. It was the most populous village in its rural district.

After the census, the rural district was separated from the district in the formation of Shamil District. Hasan Langi-ye Bala was transferred to Hasan Langi Rural District created in the new district.
