= Pa Qalatan =

Pa Qalatan (Persian: پاقلاتان), also rendered as Paghalatan, Pakalatun and Pa Qalatun, may refer to:

- Pa Qalatan-e Bala
- Pa Qalatan-e Pain
