= Pa Qalatan-e Pain =

Pa Qalatan-e Pain پاقلاتان پائين
- Village
- Location within Iran
- Coordinates: 27°23′43″N 56°47′35″E
- Country: Iran
- Province: Hormozgan
- County: Bandar Abbas
- Bakhsh: Takht
- Rural District: Shamil

Population (2006)
  - Total: 1,068
- Time zone: UTC+3:30 (IRST)
  - Summer (DST): UTC+4:30 (IRDT)

Pa Qalatan-e Pain (Persian: پاقلاتان پائين, also Romanized as Pā Qalātān-e Pā’īn; also known as Paghalatan, Pākalātūn, Pā Qalātān, and Pā Qalātūn) is a village in Shamil Rural District, Takht District, Bandar Abbas County, Hormozgan Province, Iran. At the 2006 census, its population was 1,068, in 260 families.
