= Hormuz Island =

Iranian island in the Persian Gulf

- Island
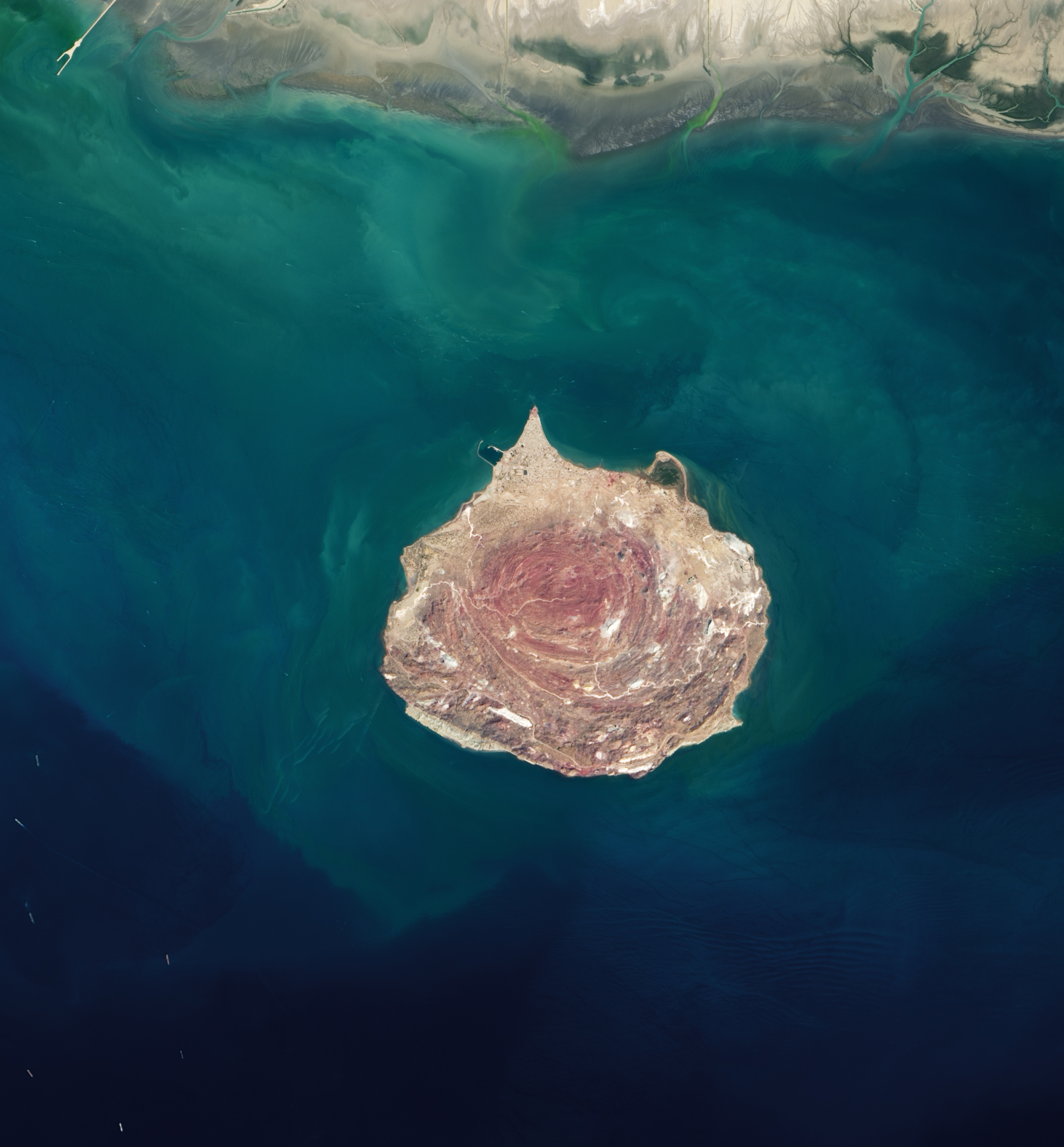
- A satellite image of Hormuz Island
- Interactive map of Hormuz Island
- Location within Persian Gulf Location within Iran
- Coordinates: 27°04′03″N 56°27′36″E
- Country: Iran
- Province: Hormozgān
- County: Bandar Abbas
- District: Hormuz

Area
  - Land: 42 km^{2} (16.2 sq mi)
- Elevation: 186 m (610 ft)

Population
  - Total: ~6,000
- Time zone: UTC+3:30 (IRST)

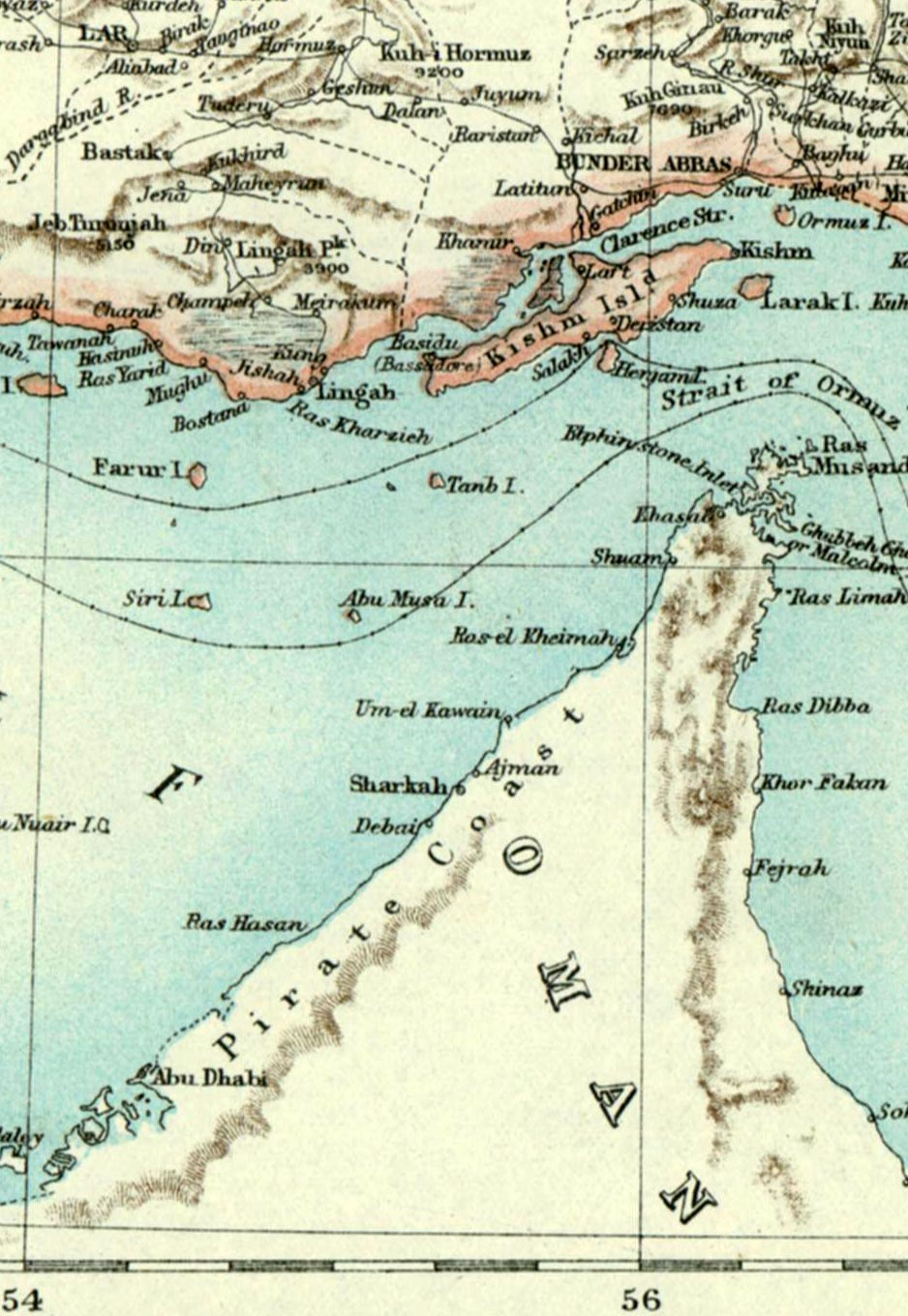
A historical map of the Strait of Hormuz showing the island spelled as Ormuz, top right

Hormuz Island (/hɔːrˈmuːz/; Persian: جزیره هرمز, romanized: Jazire-ye Hormoz), also spelled Hormoz, Ormoz, Ormuz or Ormus, is an Iranian island in the Persian Gulf.

== Geography ==
Hormuz Island has an area of 42 km^{2} (16 sq mi). Located in the Strait of Hormuz, 8 km (5 mi) off the Iranian coast, the island is part of Hormuz District, Bandar Abbas County, Hormozgan Province. It is sparsely inhabited, but some development has taken place since the late 20th century. The city of Hormuz is in the north of the island.

=== Geology ===
Reddish ochre on the island and its beaches, called Golak by natives, has been exploited for artistic and culinary purposes, and also attracts tourists. Degradation due to overuse of the ochre has resulted in actions by the Department of Environment to protect it.

The satellite images catching the concentric arrangement of the rocks show that Hormuz Island appears to be a salt diapir, composed of ancient seasalt deposits which, due to lack of salt-dissolving groundwater and rains, and due to their plastic deformability, can flow and squeeze just like ice. Under the squeezing pressure of other sediments on top, the salt has managed to rise above the surface over many thousands of years, and has eroded into different shapes. The geological age of Hormuz Island is about 600 million years, and its life out of the water is about 50,000 years.

=== Environment ===
Iran's southern coast is known for its aridity and salty sea water. The island's waterways and wild birds attract many tourists. Hormuz has a forest of mangrove trees: trees that live in the saltwater tidal area. Sometimes, most of them are submerged in the sea water, but continue to survive. There is a grassy area that grows without the need for fresh water. In a story, this mythical plant is grown from Adam's tears.

The island has been designated an Important Bird Area (IBA) by BirdLife International because it supports Saunders's terns, great thick-knees, and sooty gulls.

== History ==
=== Early history ===
The earliest evidence for human presence on the island is several stone artifacts discovered at the eastern shorelines of the island. A lithic scatter was found at a site called Chand-Derakht, which is an uplifted marine Pleistocene terrace. This site yielded a Middle Paleolithic lithic assemblage characterized by Levallois methods and dates back over 40,000 years.

=== Medieval history ===
The island, known as Organa (Όργανα) to the ancient Greeks and as Jarun in the Islamic period, acquired the name of "Hormuz" from the important harbour town of Hormuz (Ormus) on the mainland 60 kilometres (37 mi) away, which had been a centre of a minor principality on both sides of the strait. The principality paid tribute to the Mongol-ruled Ilkhanate and was an important source of income from maritime trade.

The town's ruler decided to shift his residence to the island around 1300, in order to evade attacks by Mongolian and Turkish groups from the interior. The ruler later made peace with the Ilkhans.

Ibn Battuta also visited the island and New Hormuz.

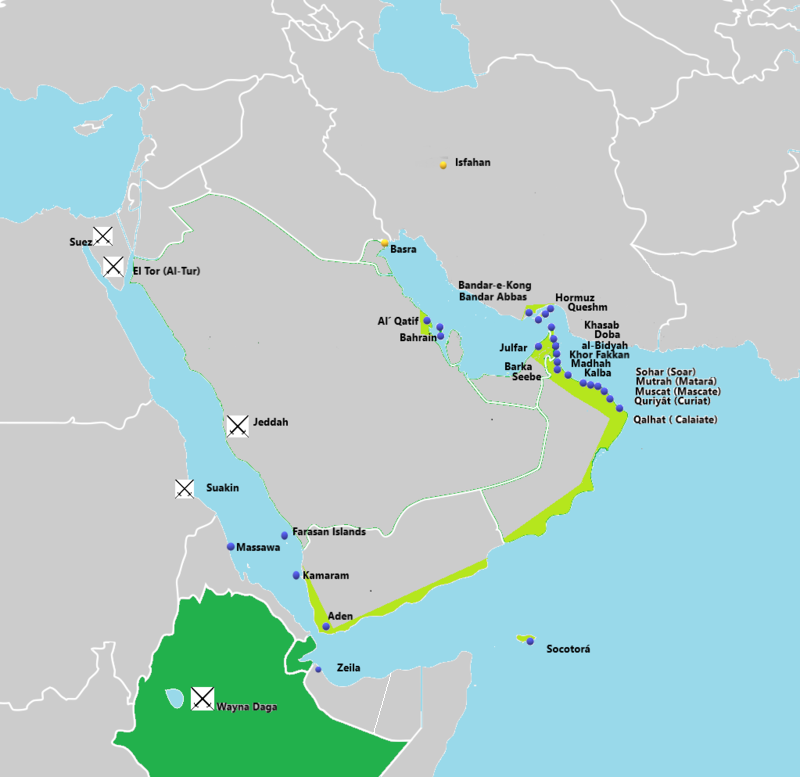
The historical Portuguese presence in the Persian Gulf and Red Sea in the 1500s. Green – Portuguese possessions. Dark green – allied or under influence.

=== Portuguese era ===
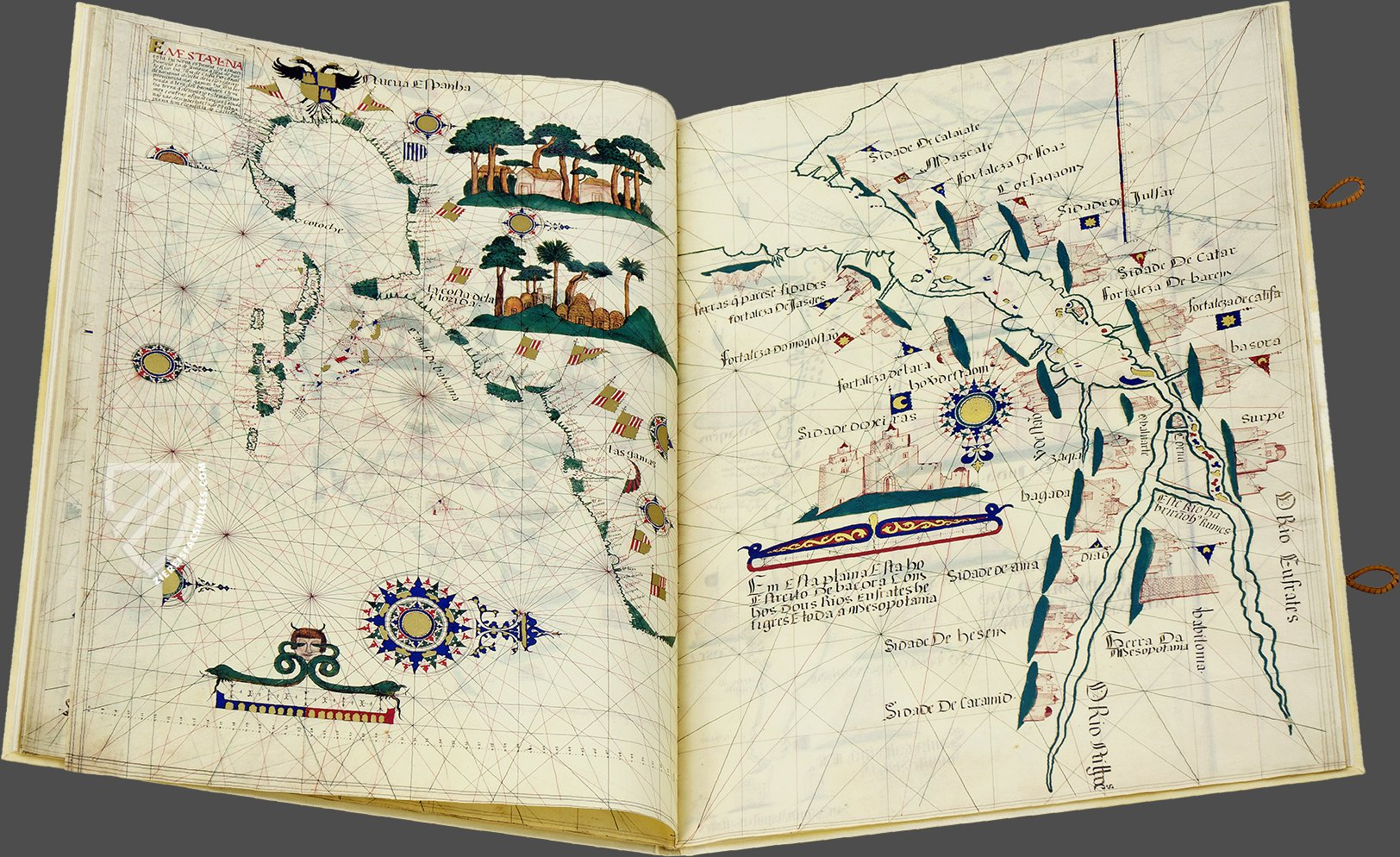
Sidade de Ormuz depicted in Lázaro Luís' 1563 map of Arabia and the Persian Gulf

In 1505, King Manuel I of Portugal established a policy of expansion in Africa and Western Asia. During attempts to expand Portuguese influence into the Indian Ocean, the Portuguese duke Afonso de Albuquerque captured the island in 1507 and it was incorporated into the greater Portuguese Empire. The Portuguese constructed a fortress on the island to deter potential invaders, naming it the Fort of Our Lady of the Conception.

The island became an emergency stopover point for Portuguese ships traveling to Goa, Gujarat, and nearby Kishm. The Ottomans laid siege to the island under the admiral and cartographer Piri Reis in 1552. In 1575, a group of Augustinian hermits settled on the island and established from here a mission in Isfahan in 1602.

=== Later period ===
After the expulsion of the Portuguese forces in 1622, Shah Abbas I of Persia distrusted the local population and was not interested in maintaining the island as a trading centre or military post; instead, he developed the nearby mainland port of Bandar Abbas. Hormuz went into decline. Many of its inhabitants seasonally moved to their fields and orchards around the old Hormuz on the mainland, only fishermen being in permanent residence. The island continued to export small quantities of rock salt and lumps of iron oxide, which were used as ballast stones for sailing ships.

== Attractions ==
=== Red Beach ===
The mountain on the shoreline, makes the red beach and red sea waves an unusual sight. Visitors walking along the shore will encounter areas where sand glitters with metal compounds.

=== Dr Nadalian Museum ===
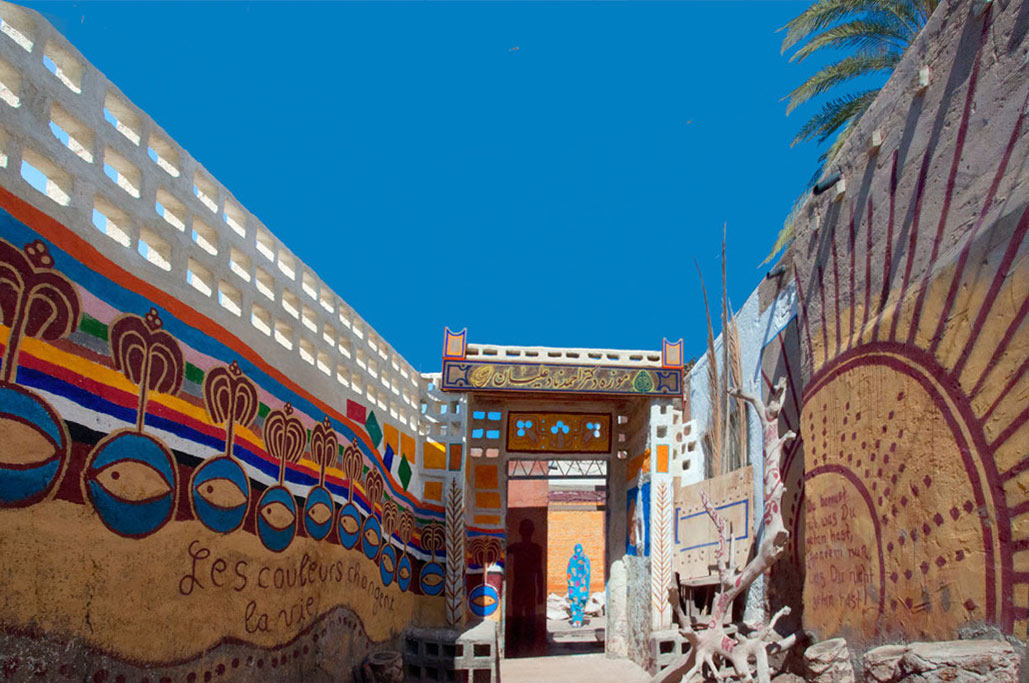
The Museum and Gallery of Dr Ahmad Nadalian in Hormoz Island

The Museum of Dr Nadalian in Hormuz Island, also known as the Museum and Gallery of Ahmad Nadalian in Hormuz Island, shows the work of Ahmad Nadalian (born 1963), whose works have been shown in galleries internationally. His environmental art projects include rock carvings. The museum also displays works by local indigenous women, bones of sea creatures, and dolls made of recycled materials.

The museum was created in March 2009 as the Paradise Art Centre, being renamed in 2012 to its current name. Also at this time, its entrance was redesigned with inspiration from local architecture.

== Gallery ==
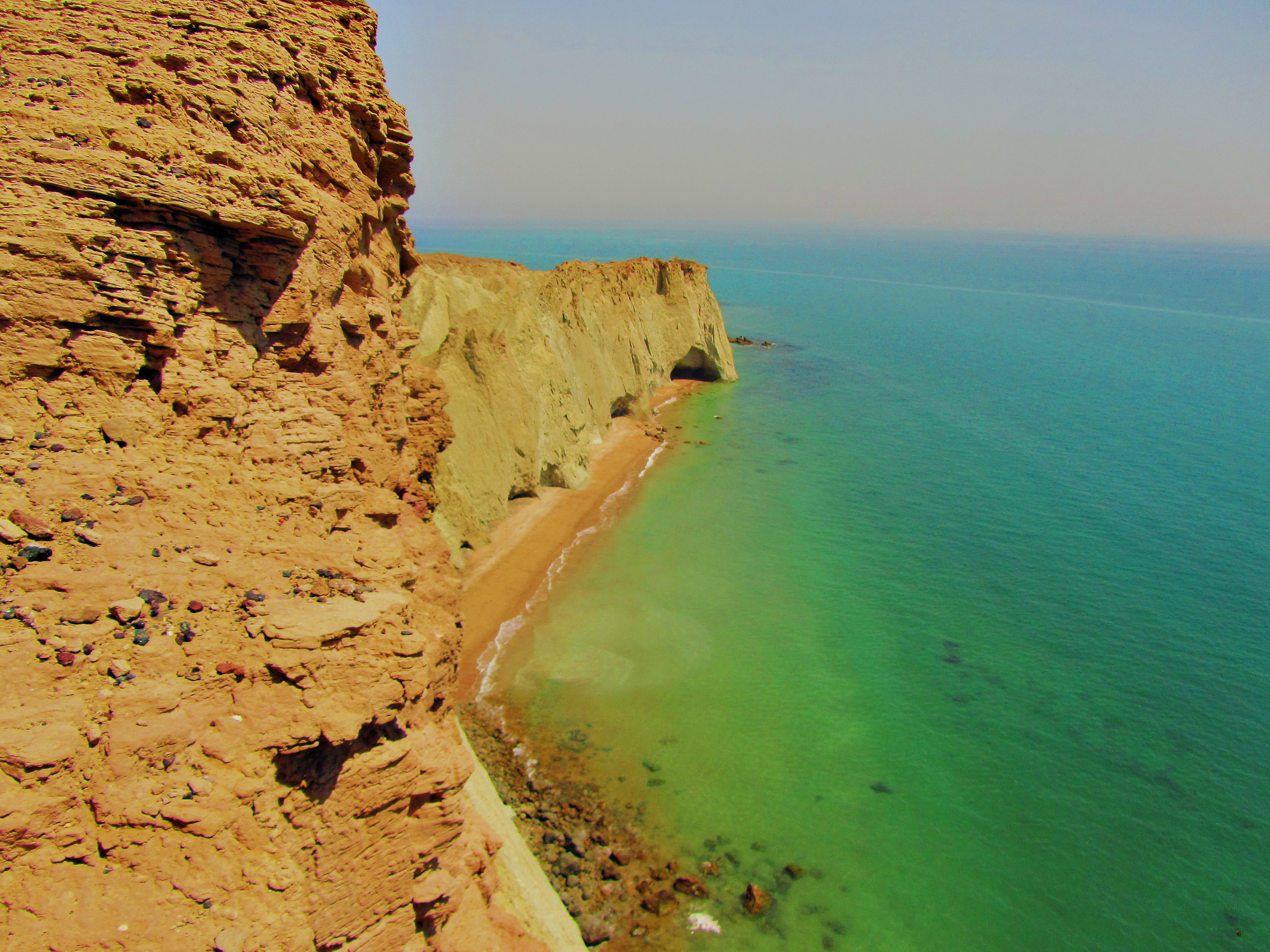
Hormuz Island beach

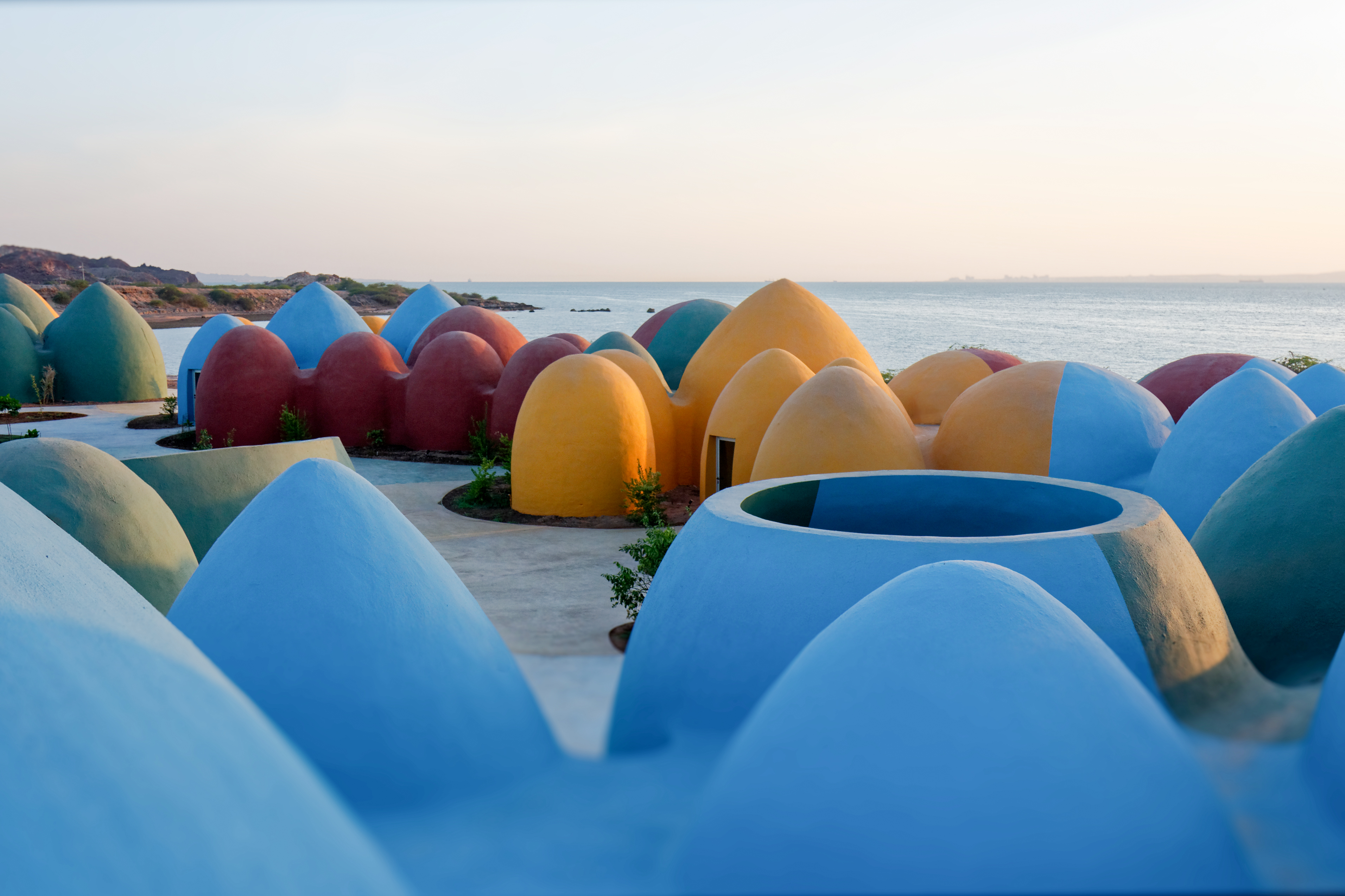
Majara Residence

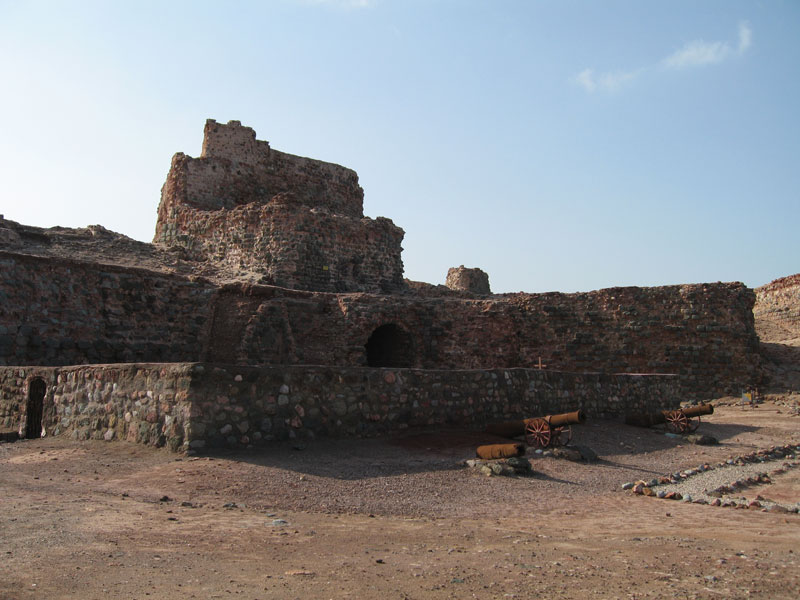
The Fort of Our Lady of the Conception, Hormuz Island

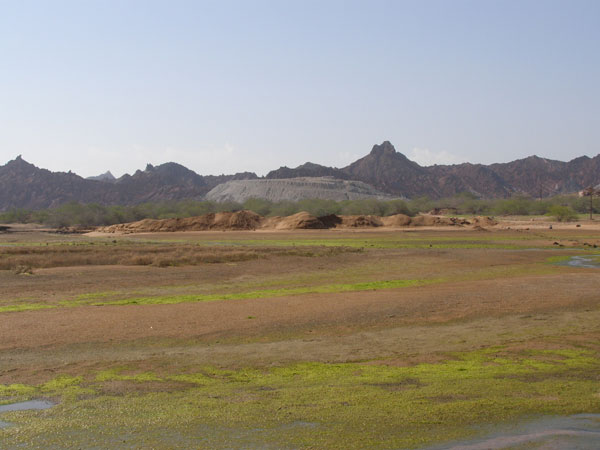
Hara forests at Hormuz Island

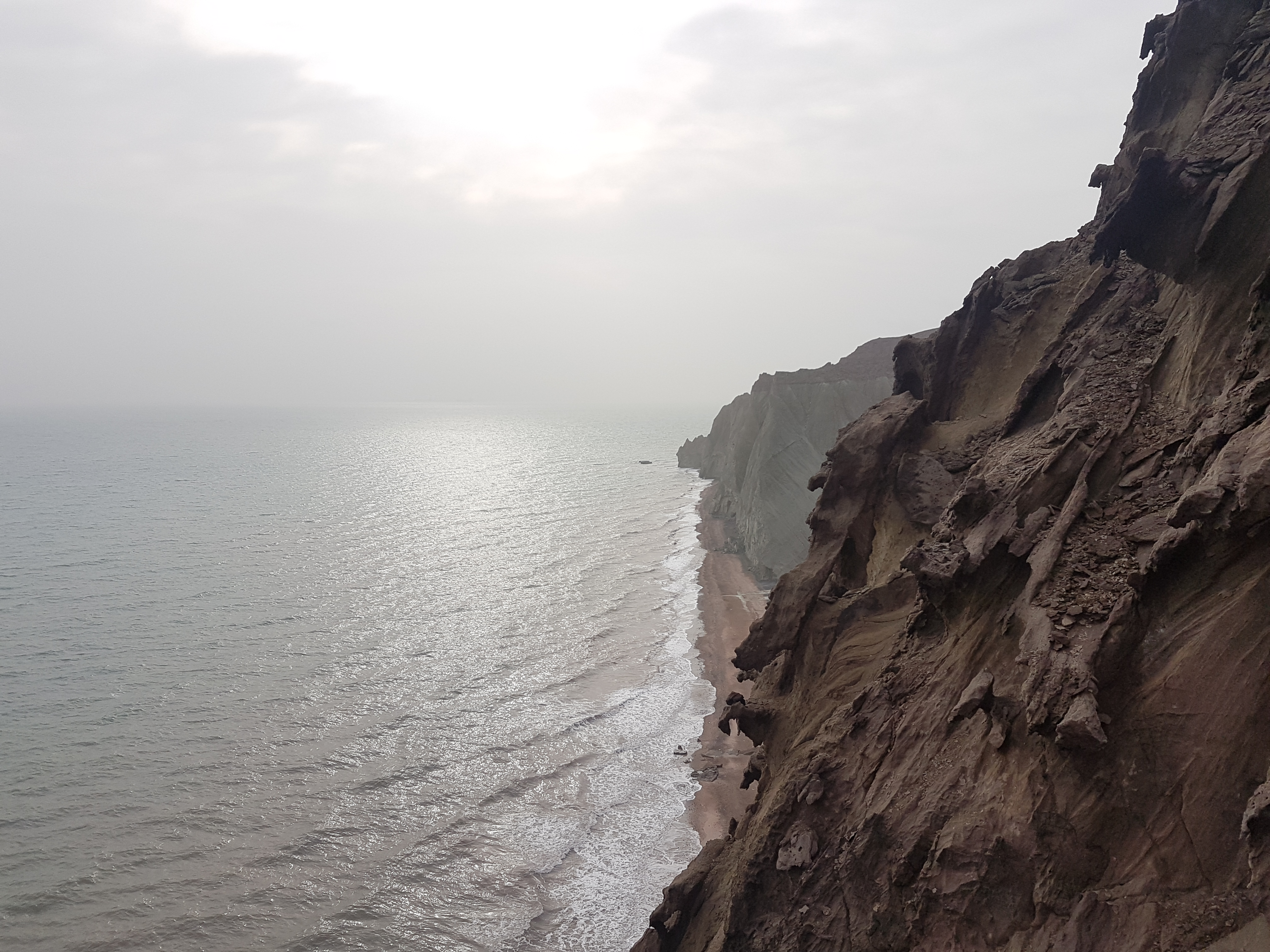
The sea cliffs near the Valley of Statues of Hormuz Island

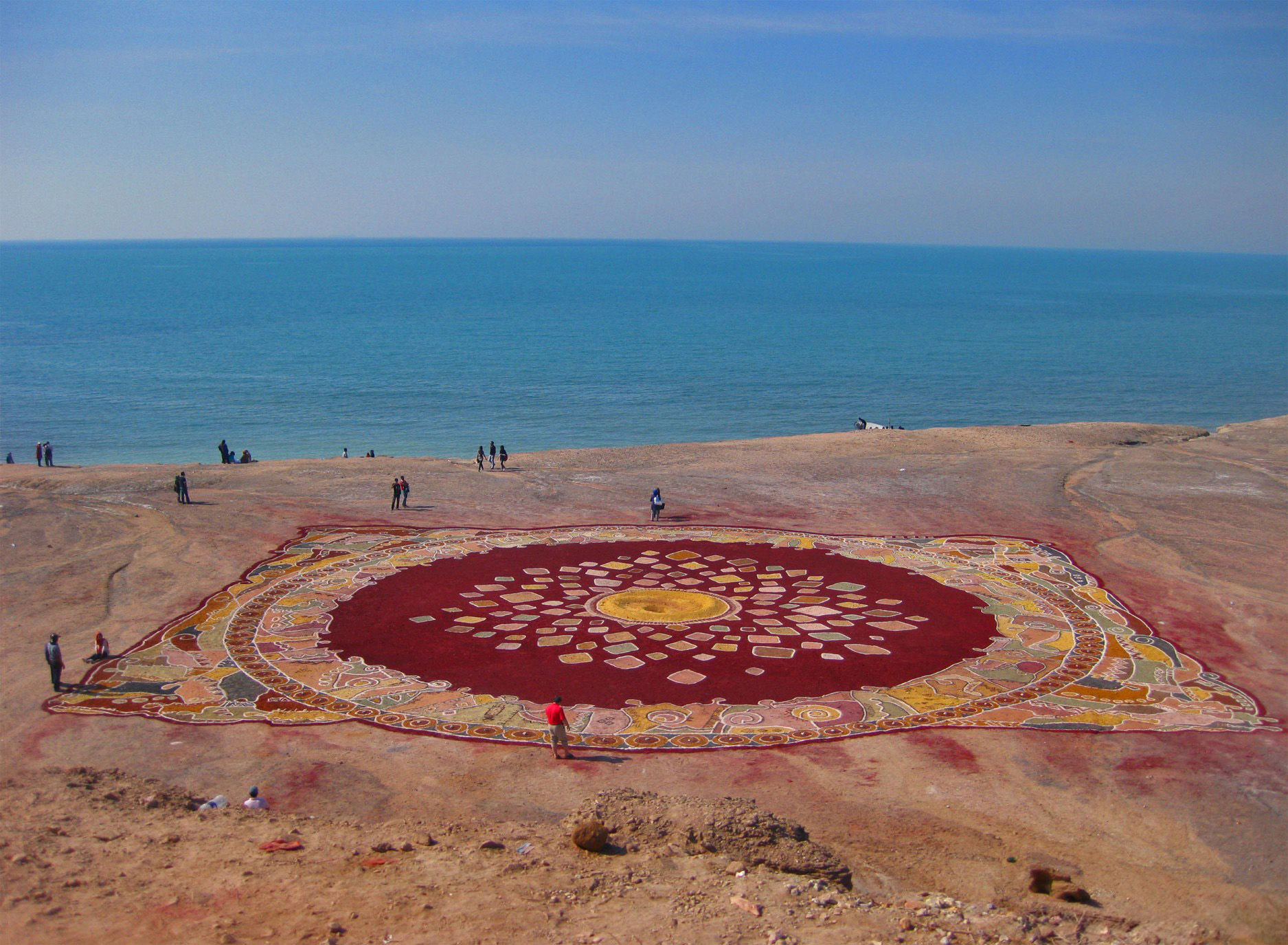
Art made from ochre on the islands beaches
