= Jilebi (disambiguation) =

Jilebi or Jalebi is a deep fried pastry from the Indian subcontinent and the Middle East, a type of doughnut which is related to the Arab zalabiyeh.

Jilebi may also refer to:

- Jilebi (2015 film), an Indian family comedy film by Arun Shekar, starring Jayasurya, Gourav Menon and Remya Nambessan
- Jilebi (2017 film), an Indian Kannada-language horror thriller film by Lucky Shankar, starring Pooja Gandhi
- Jilebi (2023 film), an Indian Telugu-language romantic-comedy film by K. Vijaya Bhaskar, starring Sree Kamal and Shivani Rajashekar

== See also ==
- Jalabe (disambiguation)
- Jalebi (film), a 2018 Indian Hindi-language film by Pushpdeep Bhardwaj
- "Jalebi Baby", a song by Tesher and Jason Derulo
- "Jalebi Bai", a song by Anand Raaj Anand and Ritu Pathak from the 2011 Indian film Double Dhamaal
- Jalebi Rocks, a 2025 Indian Gujarati-language film by Chinmay Purohit
