= Zohuki =

Zohuki or Zahooki or Zehuki (Persian: زهوكي) may refer to:

- Zohuki, Bandar Abbas
- Zehuki, Minab
