= Sar Zeh-ye Sofla =

Sar Zeh-ye Sofla or Sarzeh-ye Sofla (Persian: سرزه سفلي) may refer to:

- Sar Zeh-ye Sofla, Hormozgan
- Sarzeh-ye Sofla, Kerman
