= Jut =

Jut or JUT may refer to:

- Jharkhand University of Technology, a state university in the state of Jharkhand, India
- Jut, Iran, a village in Hormozgan Province, Iran
- Jut Line, a neighbourhood of Jamshed Town, Karachi, Pakistan
- jut, the ISO 639-3 code for the Jutlandic dialect of the Danish language
- Hendrik Jut (1851–1878), Dutch murderer
- Nikolaj Jut or Nikolai Yut (1898–1967), Russian Chuvash writer
- Jut or zud, massive dying of livestock due to impossibility of grazing in Asian steppe areas

== See also ==
- Jute, a coarse vegetable textile fiber
- Jutes, a historical Germanic people
