= Hormuz, Iran =

City in Hormozgan province, Iran

Hormuz Persian: هرمز
- City
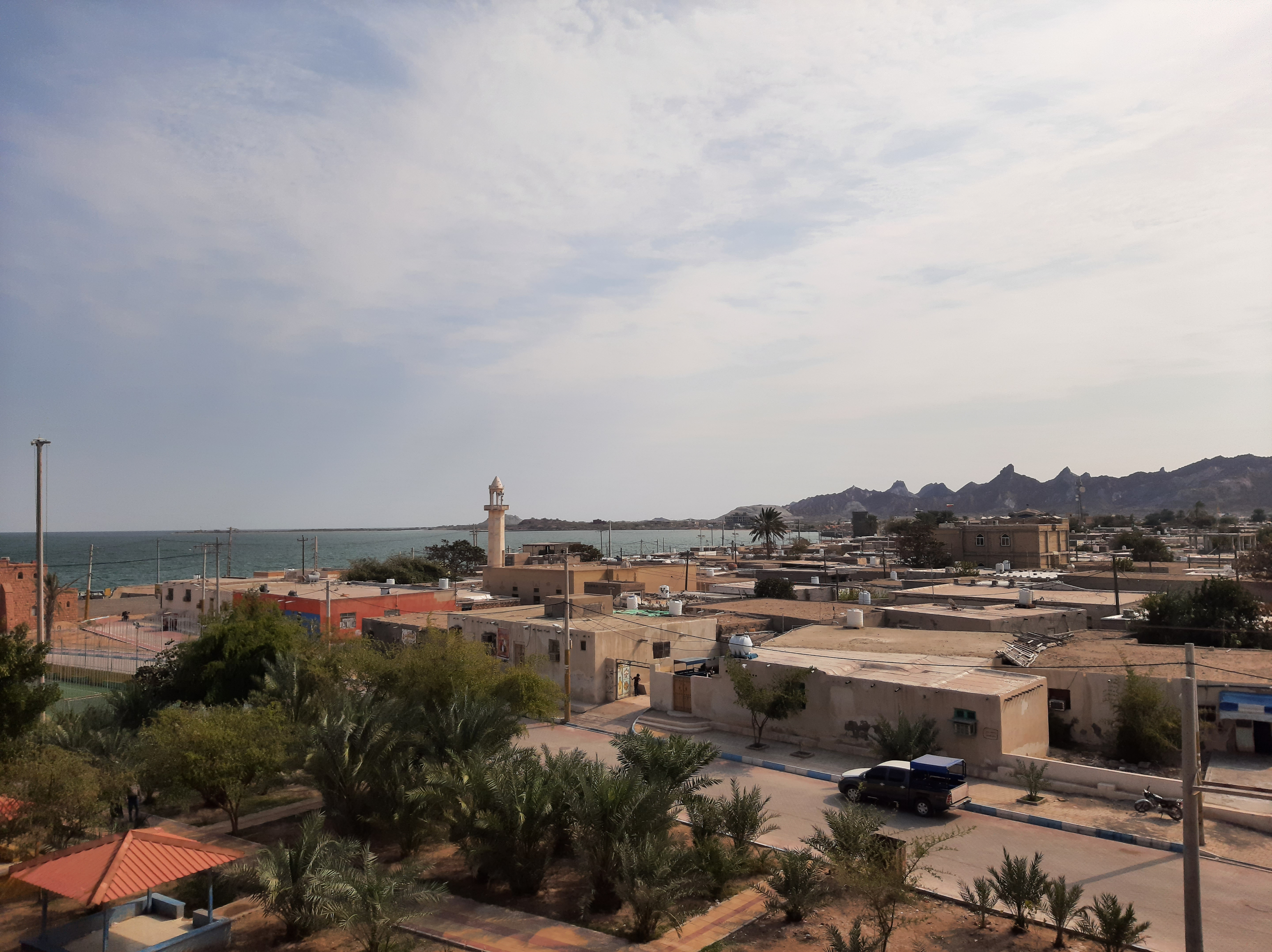
- Old town from Portuguese fortress
- Interactive map of Hormuz
- Location within Persian Gulf Location within Iran
- Coordinates: 27°05′33″N 56°27′05″E
- Country: Iran
- Province: Hormozgan
- County: Bandar Abbas
- District: Hormuz

Population (2016)
  - Total: 5,891
- Time zone: UTC+3:30 (IRST)

Hormuz (Persian: هرمز) (Note: Also romanized as Hurmuz; also known as Ormus and Qal‘eh-ye Hormoz (قلعهٔ هرمز)) is a city on Hormuz Island and the capital of Hormuz District, Bandar Abbas County, Hormozgan province, Iran.

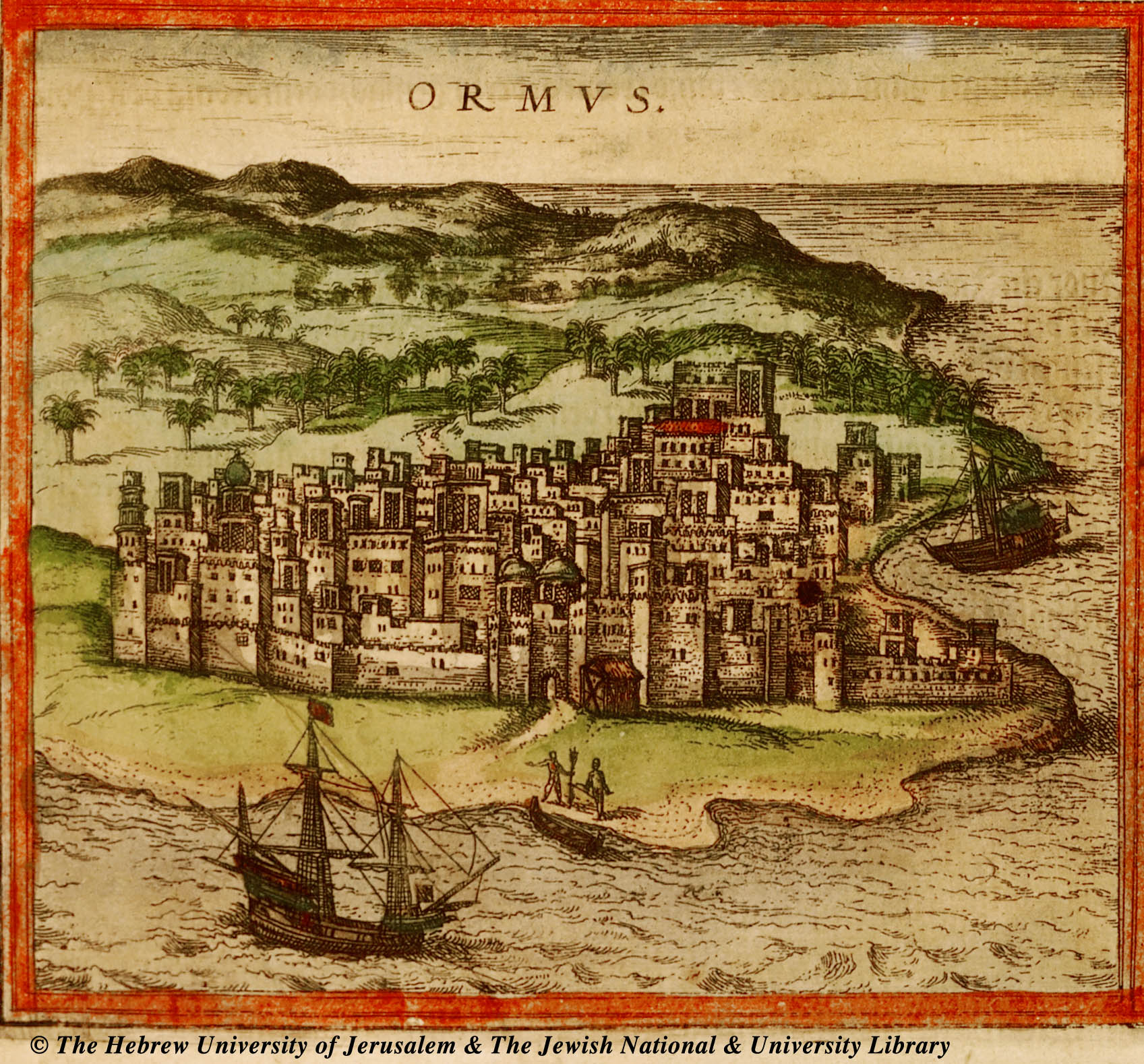
Hormuz was an important strategic port in ancient days (sketch from 1572).

== Demographics ==
=== Population ===
At the time of the 2006 National Census, the city's population was 5,699 in 1,143 households, when it was in Qeshm County. The following census in 2011 counted 5,867 people in 1,345 households. The 2016 census measured the population of the city as 5,891 people in 1,698 households.

The district was transferred to Bandar Abbas County in 2019.

The name of the Strait of Hormuz is taken from this island.

== See also ==
- Ormus
