= Hormuz District =

District in Hormozgan province, Iran

Hormuz District Persian: بخش هرمز
- District
- Location within Iran
- Coordinates: 27°03′52″N 56°27′48″E
- Country: Iran
- Province: Hormozgan
- County: Bandar Abbas
- Capital: Hormuz

Population (2016)
  - Total: 5,891
- Time zone: UTC+3:30 (IRST)

Hormuz District (Persian: بخش هرمز), on Hormuz Island, is a district of Bandar Abbas County, Hormozgan province, Iran. Its capital is the city of Hormuz.

== Demographics ==
=== Population ===
At the time of the 2006 National Census, the district's population (as a part of Qeshm County) was 5,699 in 1,143 households. The following census in 2011 counted 5,867 people in 1,345 households. The 2016 census measured the population of the district as 5,891 inhabitants in 1,698 households.

The district was transferred to Bandar Abbas County in 2019.

=== Administrative divisions ===
Hormuz District Population (Note: As a part of Qeshm County at the 2006, 2011, and 2016 censuses)
Administrative Divisions	2006	2011	2016
Hormuz (city)	5,699	5,867	5,891
Total	5,699	5,867	5,891
