= Takht, Hormozgan =

City in Hormozgan province, Iran

Takht Persian: تخت
- City
- Location within Iran
- Coordinates: 27°30′08″N 56°38′05″E
- Country: Iran
- Province: Hormozgan
- County: Bandar Abbas
- District: Takht

Population (2016)
  - Total: 3,082
- Time zone: UTC+3:30 (IRST)

Takht (Persian: تخت) is a city in, and the capital of, Takht District of Bandar Abbas County, Hormozgan province, Iran. It also serves as the administrative center for Takht Rural District.

== Demographics ==
=== Population ===
At the time of the 2006 National Census, Takht's population was 2,287 in 527 households, when it was a village in Takht Rural District. The following census in 2011 counted 2,648 people in 699 households, by which time the village had been elevated to the status of a city. The 2016 census measured the population of the city as 3,082 people in 894 households.
