= Si Khvoran-e Bala =

Si Khvoran-e Bala سيخوران بالا
- Village
- Location within Iran
- Coordinates: 27°50′02″N 56°28′29″E
- Country: Iran
- Province: Hormozgan
- County: Bandar Abbas
- Bakhsh: Fin
- Rural District: Siyahu

Population (2006)
  - Total: 88
- Time zone: UTC+3:30 (IRST)
  - Summer (DST): UTC+4:30 (IRDT)

Si Khvoran-e Bala (Persian: سيخوران بالا, also Romanized as Sī Khvorān-e Bālā; also known as Sīkharān-e Bālā, Sīkharān-e ‘Oleyā, Sīkhorān-e ‘Olyā, and Sīkhūrān-e ‘Olyā) is a village in Siyahu Rural District, Fin District, Bandar Abbas County, Hormozgan Province, Iran. At the 2006 census, its population was 88, in 23 families.
