= Sarzeh, Bandar Abbas =

Sarzeh سرزه
- Village
- Location within Iran
- Coordinates: 27°33′54″N 56°07′10″E
- Country: Iran
- Province: Hormozgan
- County: Bandar Abbas
- Bakhsh: Fin
- Rural District: Fin

Population (2006)
  - Total: 1,165
- Time zone: UTC+3:30 (IRST)
  - Summer (DST): UTC+4:30 (IRDT)

Sarzeh (Persian: سرزه) is a village in Fin Rural District, Fin District, Bandar Abbas County, Hormozgan Province, Iran. At the 2006 census, its population was 1,165, in 289 families.
