= Sikhoran, Kerman =

Sikhvoran سيخوران
- Village
- Location within Iran
- Coordinates: 28°25′11″N 56°59′06″E
- Country: Iran
- Province: Kerman
- County: Arzuiyeh
- Bakhsh: Soghan
- Rural District: Soghan

Population (2006)
  - Total: 45
- Time zone: UTC+3:30 (IRST)
  - Summer (DST): UTC+4:30 (IRDT)

Sikhvoran (Persian: سيخوران, also Romanized as Sīkhvorān, Sīkhowrān, and Sīkhūrān; also known as Sīkhorān) is a village in Soghan Rural District, Soghan District, Arzuiyeh County, Kerman Province, Iran. At the 2006 census, its population was 45, in 17 families.
