= Gav Mordeh, Kerman =

Gav Mordeh گاومرده
- Village
- Location within Iran
- Coordinates: 29°08′06″N 58°17′03″E
- Country: Iran
- Province: Kerman
- County: Bam
- Bakhsh: Central
- Rural District: Howmeh

Population (2006)
  - Total: 183
- Time zone: UTC+3:30 (IRST)
  - Summer (DST): UTC+4:30 (IRDT)

Gav Mordeh (Persian: گاومرده, also Romanized as Gāv Mordeh) is a village in Howmeh Rural District, in the Central District of Bam County, Kerman Province, Iran. At the 2006 census, its population was 183, in 42 families.
