= Mariam Jalabi =

Syrian activist and feminist

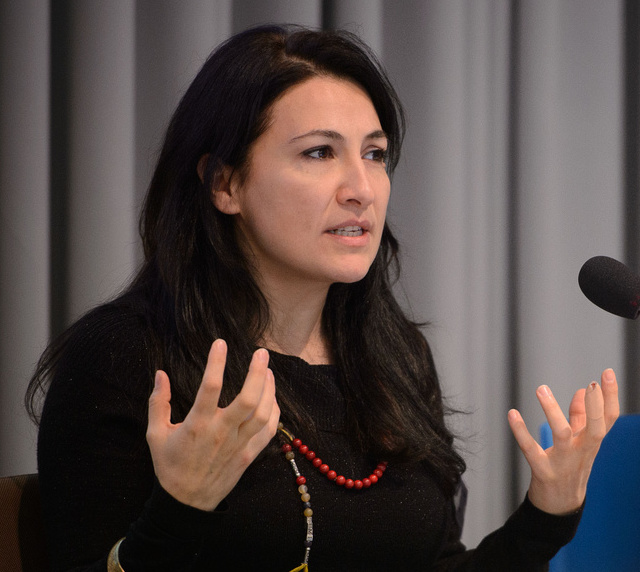
Miriam Jalabi in 2015

Mariam Jalabi is a Syrian feminist and activist. She was born in the capital of Syria, Damascus.

== Biography ==
Her father was believed to be a political and social activist, while other sources mention him as a doctor. He was detained by the Syrian regime several times, and he had to leave Syria with her mother in the 1970s. She grew up in Germany, Saudi Arabia and Canada.

As an activist, she was a member of the Syrian opposition "High Negotiation Committee Women's Advisory Committee", which sought to ensure that women participate in all aspects of the political process in Syria. She points out that the culture of international politics and decision-making is patriarchal, that progress is hard to make, and that this is not a problem specific to Syria — women are marginalized when genuine democracy, human rights and pluralism are side-lined.

Jalabi is the co-founder of the Syrian Women’s Political Movement. She has led diplomatic engagement with the Permanent Missions to the United Nations.

== Awards ==
Mariam Jalabi was honored by Sweden in the traveling exhibition "Egalitarian World from the point of view of- a tribute to those who fight for Women's Rights", consisting of fifteen portraits by Swedish photographer Anette Brolenius, of personalities who distinguished themselves in the fight for Women's Rights. This exhibition was in Portugal for the first time, opening to the public on 2 March 2020, in the municipality of Funchal, in the Autonomous Region of Madeira.
