= Sarzeh-ye Charkan =

Sarzeh-ye Charkan سرزه چاركان
- Village
- Location within Iran
- Coordinates: 26°27′24″N 58°20′03″E
- Country: Iran
- Province: Hormozgan
- County: Bashagard
- Bakhsh: Gafr and Parmon
- Rural District: Gafr and Parmon

Population (2006)
  - Total: 20
- Time zone: UTC+3:30 (IRST)
  - Summer (DST): UTC+4:30 (IRDT)

Sarzeh-ye Charkan (Persian: سرزه چاركان, also Romanized as Sarzeh-ye Chārkān) is a village in Gafr and Parmon Rural District, Gafr and Parmon District, Bashagard County, Hormozgan Province, Iran. At the 2006 census, its population was 20, in 8 families.
