= Sarzeh, Bardsir =

Sarzeh سرزه
- Village
- Location within Iran
- Coordinates: 29°32′42″N 56°57′40″E
- Country: Iran
- Province: Kerman
- County: Bardsir
- Bakhsh: Lalehzar
- Rural District: Lalehzar

Population (2006)
  - Total: 139
- Time zone: UTC+3:30 (IRST)
  - Summer (DST): UTC+4:30 (IRDT)

Sarzeh (Persian: سرزه) is a village in Lalehzar Rural District, Lalehzar District, Bardsir County, Kerman Province, Iran. At the 2006 census, its population was 139, in 33 families.
