= Sar Kam Bahmani =

Sar Kam Bahmani سركم بهمني
- Village
- Location within Iran
- Coordinates: 27°11′13″N 57°02′56″E
- Country: Iran
- Province: Hormozgan
- County: Minab
- Bakhsh: Central
- Rural District: Howmeh

Population (2006)
  - Total: 388
- Time zone: UTC+3:30 (IRST)
  - Summer (DST): UTC+4:30 (IRDT)

Sar Kam Bahmani (Persian: سركم بهمني, also Romanized as Sar Kam Bahmanī and Sar Kam-e Bahmanī; also known as Sarkam, and Sar Kam Bahman) is a village in Howmeh Rural District, in the Central District of Minab County, Hormozgan Province, Iran. At the 2006 census, its population was 388, in 82 families.
