= Sarzeh, South Khorasan =

Sarzeh سرزه
- village
- Location within Iran
- Coordinates: 32°46′13″N 59°35′13″E
- Country: Iran
- Province: South Khorasan
- County: Sarbisheh
- Bakhsh: Mud
- Rural District: Mud

Population (2006)
  - Total: 89
- Time zone: UTC+3:30 (IRST)
  - Summer (DST): UTC+4:30 (IRDT)

Sarzeh (Persian: سرزه) is a village in Mud Rural District, Mud District, Sarbisheh County, South Khorasan Province, Iran. At the 2006 census, its population was 89, in 31 families.
