= Sar Zeh-ye Sofla, Hormozgan =

Sar Zeh-ye Sofla سرزه سفلي
- Village
- Location within Iran
- Coordinates: 27°43′24″N 57°13′51″E
- Country: Iran
- Province: Hormozgan
- County: Rudan
- Bakhsh: Rudkhaneh
- Rural District: Rudkhaneh

Population (2006)
  - Total: 124
- Time zone: UTC+3:30 (IRST)
  - Summer (DST): UTC+4:30 (IRDT)

Sar Zeh-ye Sofla (Persian: سرزه سفلي, also Romanized as Sar Zeh-ye Soflá; also known as Sar Zeh and Sarzeh-ye Pā’īn) is a village in Rudkhaneh Rural District, Rudkhaneh District, Rudan County, Hormozgan Province, Iran. At the 2006 census, its population was 124, in 26 families.
