= Sarzeh-ye Sofla, Kerman =

Sarzeh-ye Sofla سرزه سفلي
- Village
- Location within Iran
- Coordinates: 30°58′17″N 56°39′33″E
- Country: Iran
- Province: Kerman
- County: Zarand
- Bakhsh: Central
- Rural District: Sarbanan

Population (2006)
  - Total: 30
- Time zone: UTC+3:30 (IRST)
  - Summer (DST): UTC+4:30 (IRDT)

Sarzeh-ye Sofla (Persian: سرزه سفلي, also Romanized as Sarzeh-ye Soflá; also known as Sarzeh) is a village in Sarbanan Rural District, in the Central District of Zarand County, Kerman Province, Iran. At the 2006 census, its population was 30, in 8 families.
