= Jalabi Rural District =

Rural district in Hormozgan province, Iran

Jalabi Rural District Persian: دهستان جلابی
- Rural District
- Location within Iran
- Coordinates: 27°16′37″N 56°45′26″E
- Country: Iran
- Province: Hormozgan
- County: Bandar Abbas
- District: Takht
- Capital: Jalabi
- Time zone: UTC+3:30 (IRST)

Jalabi Rural District (Persian: دهستان جلابی) is in Takht District of Bandar Abbas County, Hormozgan province, Iran. Its capital is the village of Jalabi, whose population at the time of the 2016 National Census was 669 in 183 households.

== History ==
Jalabi Rural District was created in Takht District after the 2016 census.
