= Hasan Langi Rural District =

Rural district in Hormozgan province, Iran

Hasan Langi Rural District Persian: دهستان حسن لنگی
- Rural District
- Location within Iran
- Coordinates: 27°24′43″N 56°53′48″E
- Country: Iran
- Province: Hormozgan
- County: Bandar Abbas
- District: Shamil
- Capital: Hasan Langi-ye Bala
- Time zone: UTC+3:30 (IRST)

Hasan Langi Rural District (Persian: دهستان حسن لنگی) is in Shamil District of Bandar Abbas County, Hormozgan province, Iran. Its capital is the village of Hasan Langi-ye Bala, whose population at the time of the 2016 National Census was 1,943 in 538 households.

== History ==
After the 2016 census, Shamil Rural District was separated from Takht District in the formation of Shamil District, and Hasan Langi Rural District was created in the new district.
