= Takht Rural District =

Rural district in Hormozgan province, Iran

Takht Rural District Persian: دهستان تخت
- Rural District
- Location within Iran
- Coordinates: 27°30′50″N 56°40′19″E
- Country: Iran
- Province: Hormozgan
- County: Bandar Abbas
- District: Takht
- Capital: Takht

Population (2016)
  - Total: 5,661
- Time zone: UTC+3:30 (IRST)

Takht Rural District (Persian: دهستان تخت) is in Takht District of Bandar Abbas County, Hormozgan province, Iran. It is administered from the city of Takht.

== Demographics ==
=== Population ===
At the time of the 2006 National Census, the rural district's population was 6,562 in 1,524 households. There were 4,926 inhabitants in 1,315 households at the following census of 2011. The 2016 census measured the population of the rural district as 5,661 in 1,661 households. The most populous of its 19 villages was Chahestan, with 1,693 people.
