= Shamil District =

District in Hormozgan province, Iran

Shamil District Persian: بخش شمیل
- District
- Location within Iran
- Coordinates: 27°33′06″N 56°48′40″E
- Country: Iran
- Province: Hormozgan
- County: Bandar Abbas
- Capital: Shamil
- Time zone: UTC+3:30 (IRST)

Shamil District (Persian: بخش شمیل) is in Bandar Abbas County, Hormozgan province, Iran. Its capital is the village of Shamil, whose population at the time of the 2016 National Census was 1,455 in 436 households.

== History ==
After the 2016 census, Shamil Rural District was separated from Takht District during the formation of Shamil District.

== Demographics ==
=== Administrative divisions ===
Shamil District
Administrative Divisions
Hasan Langi RD
Shamil RD
RD = Rural District
