= Shamil Rural District =

Rural district in Hormozgan province, Iran

Shamil Rural District Persian: دهستان شميل
- Rural District
- Location within Iran
- Coordinates: 27°33′06″N 56°48′40″E
- Country: Iran
- Province: Hormozgan
- County: Bandar Abbas
- District: Shamil
- Capital: Shamil

Population (2016)
  - Total: 24,268
- Time zone: UTC+3:30 (IRST)

Shamil Rural District (Persian: دهستان شميل) is in the Shamil District of Bandar Abbas County, Hormozgan province, Iran. Its capital is the village of Shamil.

== Demographics ==
=== Population ===
According to the 2006 national census, the rural district's population (as a part of the Takht District) was 22,280 in 4,949 households.

The 2011 census recorded a population of 24,154 in 6,198 households.

The 2016 census recorded a population of 24,268 in 6,924 households. The most populous of its 56 villages was Hasan Langi-ye Bala, with 1,943 people.

After the 2016 census, Shamil Rural District was separated from the Takht District during the formation of Shamil District.
