= Takht District =

District in Hormozgan province, Iran

Takht District Persian: بخش تخت
- District
- Location within Iran
- Coordinates: 27°22′21″N 56°41′07″E
- Country: Iran
- Province: Hormozgan
- County: Bandar Abbas
- Capital: Takht

Population (2016)
  - Total: 33,011
- Time zone: UTC+3:30 (IRST)

Takht District (Persian: بخش تخت) is in Bandar Abbas County, Hormozgan province, Iran. Its capital is the city of Takht.

== History ==
After the 2006 National Census, the village of Takht was elevated to the status of a city. After the 2016 census, Jalabi Rural District was established in the district, and Shamil Rural District was separated from it in the formation of Shamil District.

== Demographics ==
=== Population ===
At the time of the 2006 census, the district's population was 28,842 in 6,473 households. The following census in 2011 counted 31,728 people in 8,212 households. The 2016 census measured the population of the district as 33,011 inhabitants in 9,479 households.

=== Administrative divisions ===
Takht District Population
Administrative Divisions	2006	2011	2016
Jalabi RD (Note: Established after the 2016 census)			
Shamil RD (Note: Transferred to Shamil District after the 2016 census)	22,280	24,154	24,268
Takht RD	6,562	4,926	5,661
Takht (city)		2,648	3,082
Total	28,842	31,728	33,011
RD = Rural District
