= Bandar Abbas County =

County in Hormozgan province, Iran

Bandar Abbas County Persian: شهرستان بندرعباس
- County
- Location of Bandar Abbas County in Hormozgan province (center, yellow)

- Location of Hormozgan province in Iran
- Coordinates: 27°30′N 56°14′E
- Country: Iran
- Province: Hormozgan
- Capital: Bandar Abbas
- Districts: Central, Fin, Hormuz, Qaleh Qazi, Shamil, Takht

Area
  - Total: 10,001 km^{2} (3,861 sq mi)

Population (2016)
  - Total: 680,366
  - Density: 68.030/km^{2} (176.20/sq mi)
- Time zone: UTC+3:30 (IRST)

Bandar Abbas County (Persian: شهرستان بندرعباس) is in Hormozgan province, Iran. Its capital is the city of Bandar Abbas.

== History ==
After the 2006 National Census, Sarkhun Rural District was transferred from Qaleh Qazi District, and Siyahu Rural District from Fin District, to the Central District. At the same time, Dehnow Rural District was established in Qaleh Qazi District. In addition, the villages of Qaleh Qazi and Takht rose to city status. After the 2011 census, the village of Tazian-e Pain was elevated to the status of a city.

After the 2016 census, Hormuz District was transferred from Qeshm County to Bandar Abbas County. Jalabi Rural District was created in Takht District, and Shamil Rural District was separated from it in the establishment of Shamil District, including the new Hasan Langi Rural District.

== Demographics ==
=== Population ===
At the time of the 2006 census, the county's population was 498,644 in 119,485 households. The following census in 2011 counted 588,288 people in 158,677 households. The 2016 census measured the population of the county as 680,366 in 196,220 households.

=== Administrative divisions ===
Bandar Abbas County's population history and administrative structure over three consecutive censuses are shown in the following table.

Bandar Abbas County Population
Administrative Divisions	2006	2011	2016
Central District	429,093	525,042	614,599
Gachin RD	19,479	20,741	18,960
Isin RD	20,735	26,529	27,243
Sarkhun RD		6,287	7,548
Siyahu RD		10,184	8,927
Tazian RD	21,371	25,550	21,010
Bandar Abbas (city)	367,508	435,751	526,648
Tazian-e Pain (city)			4,263
Fin District	23,514	17,043	16,359
Fin RD	9,277	9,865	10,415
Gohreh RD	2,363	1,899	2,005
Siyahu RD	8,342		
Fin (city)	3,532	5,279	3,939
Hormuz District (Note: Transferred from Qeshm County after the 2016 census)			
Hormuz (city)			
Qaleh Qazi District	17,195	14,475	16,049
Dehnow RD		4,598	5,234
Qaleh Qazi RD	12,011	4,694	5,529
Sarkhun RD	5,184		
Qaleh Qazi (city)		5,183	5,286
Shamil District (Note: Established after the 2016 census)			
Hasan Langi RD			
Shamil RD			
Takht District	28,842	31,728	33,011
Jalabi RD			
Shamil RD	22,280	24,154	24,268
Takht RD	6,562	4,926	5,661
Takht (city)		2,648	3,082
Total	498,644	588,288	680,366
RD = Rural District

== See also ==
Media related to Bandar Abbas County at Wikimedia Commons
