= If No-One Sang =

Studio album by Dave Dee, Dozy, Beaky, Mick & Tich
- Released: 31 May 1968
- Recorded: February 1968
- Genre: Psychedelic rock
- Length: 41:23
- Label: Fontana, Imperial (US)
- Producer: Steve Rowland

Dave Dee, Dozy, Beaky, Mick & Tich chronology
If Music Be the Food of Love... Prepare for Indigestion (1966)	If No-One Sang (1968)	Together (1969)

Professional ratings
Review scores
Source	Rating
Allmusic	4/5 stars

If No-One Sang is the third studio album by English rock band Dave Dee, Dozy, Beaky, Mick & Tich. Allmusic called it "arguably the combo's most musically satisfying and eclectic outing". The arrangements were by John Gregory and Reg Tilsley and it was recorded by Roger Wake. In the US it was titled Time To Take Off.

== Cover ==
The album cover features the band underneath a tree, similar to their first album. All but Dozy, who is leaning against the tree, are sat/laid down on the grass. The cover personnel is (from left to right): Dozy, Beaky, Dave Dee, Tich, and Mick.

== Track listing ==
No.	Title	Writer(s)	Length
1.	"If No-One Sang"	Howard Blaikley (Alan Blaikley and Ken Howard)	2:01
2.	"Where From, Where To?"	Howard Blaikley	3:04
3.	"I've Got a Feeling"	Howard Blaikley	2:54
4.	"In a Matter of a Moment"	Howard Blaikley	2:40
5.	"Mrs. Thursday"	Dave Harman, John Dymond, Trevor Ward-Davies	3:46
6.	"Zabadak"	Howard Blaikley	3:49
7.	"Mama, Mama"	Kave	2:36
8.	"If I Were a Carpenter"	Tim Hardin	2:56
9.	"The Legend of Xanadu"	Howard Blaikley	3:36
10.	"Look at Me"	Walter Morris	2:27
11.	"The Tide Is Turning"	Howard Blaikley	3:09
12.	"Breakout"	Gary Illingworth, Myrna March	3:24
13.	"Time to Take Off"	Albert Hammond	3:09
14.	"If No-One Sang"	Howard Blaikley	1:52

2009 reissue bonus tracks
No.	Title	Writer(s)	Length
15.	"I'll Love You"		2:41
16.	"Things Go Better"		2:44
17.	"Please"	Dave Harman, John Dymond, Trevor Davies	3:20
18.	"Last Night in Soho"	Howard Blaikley	3:18
19.	"The Wreck of the 'Antoinette'"	Howard Blaikley	3:09
20.	"Still Life"	Dave Harman, John Dymond, Trevor Davies	2:59
21.	"Charlie Farns, Barns Has Won the Pool"		3:40
22.	"Castle Far"		2:28
23.	"Zabadak" (Italian version)	Howard Blaikley	3:44
24.	"Follemente Vivo" ("Save Me" - Italian version)	Howard Blaikley	3:00
