= Touch Me, Touch Me =

1967 single by Dave Dee, Dozy, Beaky, Mick & Tich

- Cover of the single released in Germany

Single by Dave Dee, Dozy, Beaky, Mick & Tich
- B-side: "Marina"
- Released: 3 March 1967
- Recorded: 15 February 1967
- Studio: Philips, London
- Genre: Pop; beat
- Length: 2:34
- Label: Fontana
- Songwriters: Ken Howard; Alan Blaikley
- Producer: Steve Rowland

Dave Dee, Dozy, Beaky, Mick & Tich singles chronology
"Save Me" (1966)	"Touch Me, Touch Me" (1967)	"Okay!" (1967)

"Touch Me, Touch Me" is a song by Dave Dee, Dozy, Beaky, Mick & Tich, released as a single in March 1967. It peaked at number 13 on the UK Singles Chart.

== Release ==
"Touch Me, Touch Me" was released with the B-side "Marina", written by Dave Dee, Dozy, Beaky, Mick and Tich. However, in a few European countries, the Netherlands, Austria, Yugoslavia and Greece, "Touch Me, Touch Me" was released with the B-side "Nose for Trouble", taken from the band's debut album Dave Dee, Dozy, Beaky, Mick & Tich.

The single fell short of the band's expectations by missing out on the UK top-ten. This led writers Ken Howard and Alain Blaikley to become "aware of the fast movement in the pop business again" and that "their previously successful beat-driven style was worn out". Therefore, the band's following single "Okay!" saw another slight change in direction.

== Reception ==
Reviewing for Record Mirror, Peter Jones described "Touch Me, Touch Me" as the band's "sixth hit in a row" and "a change of approach, too, but the same instant impact, with good lyrics and a commercial driving beat". In Melody Maker, the song was described as "not such a smash as "Bend It", but it contains all the usual Dave Dee ingredients, i.e. a somewhat suggestive title, a drum beat that sounds like an asthmatic dog barking, soaring harmonies and a full stop at the end that sounds as if the recording engineer had been shot through the head and fallen off his controls".

However, Penny Valentine for Disc was less impressed, writing that "this record just goes to prove that every so often a golden goose can lay a dud egg" and that it lacks "that certain hit something". She added that "the group sound as though they have hiccoughs and the record doesn't sound too big a hit".

== Track listing ==
7": Fontana / TF 798

1. "Touch Me, Touch Me" – 2:34
2. "Marina" – 2;21

7": Fontana / 267 686 TF (Netherlands and Austria)

1. "Touch Me, Touch Me" – 2:34
2. "Nose for Trouble" – 4:01

== Charts ==
Chart (1967)	Peak position
Australia (Kent Music Report)	45
Austria (Ö3 Austria Top 40)	14
Belgium (Ultratop 50 Wallonia)	39
Germany (GfK)	8
Netherlands (Dutch Top 40)	31
New Zealand (Listener)	7
Sweden (Tio i Topp)	11
UK Singles (Official Charts)	13
