= Last Night in Soho (song) =

1968 single by Dave Dee, Dozy, Beaky, Mick & Tich

- Cover of the single released in Italy

Single by Dave Dee, Dozy, Beaky, Mick & Tich
- B-side: "Mrs. Thursday"
- Released: 28 June 1968
- Recorded: 31 May 1968
- Studio: Philips (London)
- Genre: Psychedelic pop
- Length: 3:17
- Label: Fontana
- Songwriters: Ken Howard; Alan Blaikley
- Producer: Steve Rowland

Dave Dee, Dozy, Beaky, Mick & Tich singles chronology
"The Legend of Xanadu" (1968)	"Last Night in Soho" (1968)	"The Wreck of the 'Antoinette'" (1968)

"Last Night in Soho" is a single by English pop band Dave Dee, Dozy, Beaky, Mick & Tich, released by Fontana on 28 June 1968. Written by the band's regular songwriters Ken Howard and Alan Blaikley, it was the follow-up to the chart topper "The Legend of Xanadu" and gave the band their final top-ten placing on the UK Singles Chart, reaching number 8.

== Composition ==
"Last Night in Soho" is described in Colin Larkin's Encyclopedia of Popular Music as "a leather-boy motorbike saga portraying lost innocence in London's most notorious square mile". Songwriters Ken Howard and Alan Blaikley wrote the song with "a strong visual image" in mind, prompted by a comment made by Dave Dee. The duo were keen to write a song about a British city to counter the many famous songs about cities like New York and Paris. In contrast to the exotic themes of the band's previous singles "Zabadak!" and "The Legend of Xanadu", the song is set in Soho, an area in the West End of London renowned for much of the 20th century as a base for the city's sex industry and night life. It concerns an ex-convict who attempts to go straight for the sake of his lover, but succumbs to temptation after reuniting with his hoodlum friends. The final verse finds him heading for a prison sentence and bidding a regretful farewell to his lover. Writer Rob Chapman has described the song as "a psycho-drama set in Gangland" with "a middle eight straight out of Lionel Bart and Joan Littlewood".

The song incorporates a dramatic orchestral arrangement by Reg Tilsley. A detuning hammond organ signifies the arrival of the police. Frontman Dave Dee considered the song more serious than previous hits for his band, telling Disc and Music Echo "Nobody can say that we've made repetitive records in the past. They were gimmicky but always different from each other. But there comes a time when you must progress and try something a little straighter". The song was Dee's favourite of his band's hits.

== Release ==
"Last Night in Soho", backed with the band's own composition "Mrs. Thursday", was released by Fontana on 28 June 1968. Dave Dee preferred "Last Night in Soho" to the band's previous hit, "The Legend of Xanadu". The band were photographed with a motorcycle in front of a Soho strip bar in promotion of the single and performed it on the 4 July edition of Top of the Pops. Tich Amery reflected: "For that one we had the striped waist-coats and black leather – the big motorbike – it was that kind of photograph." The song peaked at number 8 on the UK Singles Chart, ultimately spending eleven weeks on the chart. It was Dave Dee, Dozy, Beaky, Mick & Tich's final top ten single.

== Critical reception and legacy ==
"Last Night in Soho" received praise from Peter Jones of Record Mirror, who noted "the constant switching of style that keeps this group right there at the top". Chris Welch of Melody Maker considered the song less commercial than "The Legend of Xanadu", deeming it "well away from their usual gimmick-laden performances". Ray Davies, whose Kinks single "Days" was in the charts at the same time as "Last Night in Soho", declared in Disc and Music Echo's "Hit Talk" column that he disliked the song, adding: "'Xanadu' was not a favourite of mine and neither is this". Interviewed for the Melody Maker column "Blind Date", The Who's Keith Moon commented: "I prefer this to the Hungarian Beer Chants they usually do". Retrospectively, authors Frogg Moody and Richard Nash describes it as another of Howard and Blaikley's 'story' songs, "in which a man finds love and is then tempted back into crime by his dodgy mates".

Following the single's success, Dave Dee expressed his wish to become an actor, telling Disc and Music Echo "it's okay to keep turning out hits, but it reaches the point where you have nothing particular to aim for. If you have no challenge life becomes very dull and boring and you end up making duff records". Dee left the band over a year later in September 1969 and appeared in the 1970 comedy film Every Home Should Have One starring Marty Feldman.

Singer-songwriter Mike Scott of the Waterboys says that, in 1968, "Last Night in Soho" became the first record he ever bought, crediting it as the moment he realised he "knew [he] had to be in music".

Having heard "Hold Tight", a 1966 hit single for Dave Dee, Dozy, Beaky, Mick & Tich, used in the Quentin Tarantino film Death Proof, film director Edgar Wright came upon "Last Night in Soho". His 2021 psychological horror film is named after the song. The song plays over the film's end credits.

== Charts ==
Chart (1968)	Peak position
Australia (Kent Music Report)	61
Germany (GfK)	13
Ireland (IRMA)	11
Netherlands (Dutch Top 40)	15
Netherlands (Single Top 100)	15
New Zealand (Listener)	4
Singapore (Radio Singapore)	1
Sweden (Tio i Topp)	11
UK Singles (Official Charts)	8
