= Snake in the Grass (song) =

1969 single by Dave Dee, Dozy, Beaky, Mick & Tich

- Cover of the single released in Belgium

Single by Dave Dee, Dozy, Beaky, Mick & Tich

from the album Together
- B-side: "Bora Bora"
- Released: 2 May 1969
- Recorded: 15 April 1969
- Studio: Philips (London)
- Genre: Pop rock
- Length: 3:05
- Label: Fontana
- Songwriter(s): Ken Howard; Alan Blaikley
- Producer(s): Steve Rowland

Dave Dee, Dozy, Beaky, Mick & Tich singles chronology
"Don Juan" (1969)	"Snake in the Grass" (1969)	"Tonight Today" (1969)

"Snake in the Grass" is a song by Dave Dee, Dozy, Beaky, Mick & Tich, released as a single in May 1969. Like with the previous single, "Don Juan", it peaked at number 23 on the UK Singles Chart.

== Release and reception ==
"Snake in the Grass" was the group's last single before the departure of Dave Dee in September 1969, after which the remaining members performed as D.B.M. & T.

Reviewing for Record Mirror, Peter Jones described "Snake in the Grass" as "somewhat of a less ambitious sort of production for the consistent team. But it's extremely catchy in a lilting, fast-paced way" and that "though there is less happening in the arrangement, this stands out as one of their most directly commercial numbers ever". For New Musical Express, Derek Johnson described the song as a "complete contrast from their recent releases – a light and fluffy number, with a suggestion of a rocksteady beat.

In May 1969, a cover version by session musicians featuring Elton John on vocals was released on the compilation album Top of the Pops Vol. 5 by the budget label Hallmark. This version would later appear on John's 1994 compilation album Chartbusters Go Pop.

== Track listing ==
1. "Snake in the Grass" – 3:05
2. "Bora Bora" – 2:14

== Charts ==
Chart (1969)	Peak position
Australia (Kent Music Report)	95
Belgium (Ultratop 50 Flanders)	17
Belgium (Ultratop 50 Wallonia)	46
Germany (GfK)	18
Singapore (Radio Singapore)	3
UK Singles (OCC)	23
