= Tonight Today =

1969 single by D. B. M. & T.

- Cover of the single released in Germany

Single by D. B. M. & T.
- B-side: "Bad News"
- Released: 7 November 1969
- Recorded: 8, 9 and 16 September 1969
- Studio: De Lane Lea Studios, London
- Genre: Pop rock
- Length: 3:16
- Label: Fontana
- Songwriters: Ken Howard; Alan Blaikley
- Producers: D. B. M. & T.

D. B. M. & T. singles chronology
"Snake in the Grass" (1969)	"Tonight Today" (1969)	"Mr. President" (1970)

"Tonight Today" is a song by the remaining members of Dave Dee, Dozy, Beaky, Mick & Tich after the departure of Dave Dee. It was released as a single in November 1969.

== Release ==
In September 1969, frontman Dave Dee decided to leave Dave Dee, Dozy, Beaky, Mick & Tich in order to pursue a solo career. The remaining members decided to continue performing today under the shortened name D. B. M. & T. Ken Howard and Alan Blaikley also remained as the managers and songwriters for the group. "Tonight Today", recorded in September, was the group's first record, released in November 1969. It was released in the US and Canada in February 1970 by Cotillion Records. The song uses a "clever canon arrangement for the song, with Dozy, Beaky and Tich each singing one tongue-twisting section counterpart to one another".

The single failed to chart on the UK Singles Chart, but was very successful in the Netherlands, where it was a top-5 hit. The group's follow-up single, "Mr. President" was more successful in the UK, peaking at number 33.

The B-side, "Bad News" became a hit in Mexico when Radio Capital disc jockey César Alejandre liked the song so much that he frequently played it on his programme "Estudiantes 1260". A Greatest Hits album of Dave Dee, Dozy, Beaky, Mick & Tich, including several D. B M. & T. songs, was released in Mexico after the success of "Bad News".

== Reception ==
Reviewing for New Musical Express, Derek Johnson described "Tonight Today" as "a bubbling Howard-Blaikley number very much in the tradition already established by the Dee outfit. There's an interesting solo that sounds like a cross between Val Doonican and Johnny Cash, plus a sing-along chorus by the rest of the boys and a bouncy beat. A cheerful blues chaser". For Record Mirror, Peter Jones wrote: "Clever use of voices, including an unidentified bass gimmick. Song is definitely strong enough and the more I hear it the more I commend it for the sheer cleverness in the harmonies. Like cascades of sound".

== Track listing ==
1. "Tonight Today" – 3:16
2. "Bad News" – 3:26

== Charts ==
Chart (1970)	Peak position
Belgium (Ultratop 50 Flanders)	17
Belgium (Ultratop 50 Wallonia)	49
Germany (GfK)	39
Netherlands (Dutch Top 40)	3
Netherlands (Single Top 100)	4
New Zealand (Listener)	13
