= Together (Dave Dee, Dozy, Beaky, Mick & Tich album) =

Studio album by Dave Dee, Dozy, Beaky, Mick & Tich
- Released: 12 September 1969
- Recorded: July 1969; except "Don Juan" and "Margareta Lidman" 27–30 January 1969; "Snake in the Grass" and "Bora Bora" 15–16 April 1969
- Studio: Philips (London); Lansdowne (London)
- Genre: Rock
- Label: Fontana
- Producer: Dave Dee, Steve Rowland

Dave Dee, Dozy, Beaky, Mick & Tich chronology
If No One Sang (1968)	Together (1969)

Professional ratings
Review scores
Source	Rating
Allmusic	3/5 stars

Together is the fourth studio album by English rock band Dave Dee, Dozy, Beaky, Mick & Tich.

== Cover ==
The album cover is a collage of different images, one being of the band, and another being of a group of people stood in front of the band, who are all sitting. The album personnel is (from left to right): Dozy, Beaky, Mick, Tich, and Dave Dee.

== Track listing ==
1. "Below the Belt" - 3:17
2. "Love Is a Drum" - 4:22
3. "First Time Loving" - 3:17
4. "Bora Bora" - 2:15
5. "Don Juan" - 3:05
6. "Snake in the Grass" - 3:08
7. "P. Teaser" - 2:49
8. "Run Colorado!" - 3:45
9. "Margareta Lidman" - 2:17
10. "Mountains of the Moon" - 3:26

== Personnel ==
- Jim Sullivan - accompaniment on "Below the Belt", "Don Juan" and "Run Colorado!"

Technical

- Roger Wake - recording engineer
- Barry Saich - cover design
