= Dave Dee, Dozy, Beaky, Mick & Tich (album) =

Studio album by Dave Dee, Dozy, Beaky, Mick & Tich
- Released: 24 June 1966
- Recorded: April–May 1966
- Genre: Beat; pop; freakbeat; mod
- Length: 34:23
- Label: Fontana

Dave Dee, Dozy, Beaky, Mick & Tich chronology
Dave Dee, Dozy, Beaky, Mick & Tich (1966)	If Music Be the Food of Love... Prepare for Indigestion (1966)

Dave Dee, Dozy, Beaky, Mick & Tich is the debut self-titled album by Dave Dee, Dozy, Beaky, Mick & Tich. It largely features songs penned by Alan Blaikley and Ken Howard including the band's first top 20 hit "Hold Tight!", which reached a peak of #4 on the UK Singles Chart in April 1966. In 1967, the album was issued in some countries under the title What's in a Name.

== Reception ==
Professional ratings
Review scores
Source	Rating
Record Mirror	4/5 stars
Allmusic	4/5 stars

Writing in Record Mirror upon the album's release, Norman Jopling and Peter Jones commented "this group wisely take the brash approach and set out to impress the listener on first hearing, rather than rely on sublety", adding "anyone who liked their singles will also like this LP, which is a commendation".

Reviewing the album for Allmusic, Lindsay Planer called the band "an instrumentally self-contained unit with a penchant for aggressive pop leanings that remained buoyant and catchy, while simultaneously flirting with the subterranean freakbeat and mod rock scenes as well." In a further Allmusic review of the album's issue as What's in a Name, Dave Thompson said the album "captures the band at both its zaniest and, fortunately, its most musical... If the Howard/Blaikley songwriting team had yet to hit the stride that would propel Dave Dee, Dozy, Beaky, Mick & Tich to the top of the charts in 1967, "You Make It Move" and "Hideaway" still possess a persistent timelessness that marked them out for greatness".

== Cover ==
The album cover features the band stood in front of a tree, looking into the distance. The cover personnel is (from left to right): Dozy, Dave Dee, Beaky, Tich, and Mick.

== Track listing ==
All tracks composed by Howard-Blaikley (Alan Blaikley and Ken Howard); except where indicated

1. "DDD-BMT" — 1:26
2. "We've Got a Good Thing Goin'" (Bill Martin, Phil Coulter) — 2:24
3. "Here's a Heart" (Lionel Segal, Pierre Tubbs) — 3:12
4. "Something I Gotta Tell You" — 2:32
5. "All I Want to Do" (Dave Harman, Ian Amey, John Dymond, Mick Wilson, Trevor Davies) — 2:36
6. "Frustration" — 2:34
7. "Hold Tight!" — 2:46
8. "Hard to Love You" — 2:30
9. "Nose for Trouble" — 4:03
10. "No More Love" — 2:18
11. "After Tonight" (Emma Chelotti, Giuseppe Russo, Howard Blaikley) — 2:57
12. "No Time" — 2:05
13. "Double Agent" (Steve Rowland) — 3:00

== Personnel ==
Dave Dee, Dozy, Beaky, Mick & Tich

- Dave Dee — vocals
- Trevor "Dozy" Ward-Davies — bass; vocals on "No More Love"
- John "Beaky" Dymond — rhythm guitar
- Michael "Mick" Wilson — drums
- Ian "Tich" Amey — lead guitar

with:

- Kenny Everett - narrator/spoken introduction on "DDD-BMT"
- Harold Geller - violin solo on "Nose for Trouble"
- Ken Howard — piano
