= The Wreck of the 'Antoinette' =

1968 single by Dave Dee, Dozy, Beaky, Mick & Tich

- Cover of the single released in Germany

Single by Dave Dee, Dozy, Beaky, Mick & Tich
- B-side: "Still Life"
- Released: 13 September 1968
- Recorded: 13 August 1968
- Studio: Philips (London)
- Genre: Pop rock
- Length: 3:06
- Label: Fontana
- Songwriters: Ken Howard; Alan Blaikley
- Producer: Steve Rowland

Dave Dee, Dozy, Beaky, Mick & Tich singles chronology
"Last Night in Soho" (1968)	"The Wreck of the 'Antoinette'" (1968)	"Run Colorado" (1969)

"The Wreck of the 'Antoinette'" is a song by Dave Dee, Dozy, Beaky, Mick & Tich, released as a single in September 1968. It peaked at number 14 on the UK Singles Chart.

== Background and release ==
The song title refers to the Antoinette, a barque that was shipwrecked on the Doom Bar. The song details the romance between a girl and a fictionalised crew member who drowned in the sinking of the Antoinette. The first lyrics of the spoken intro, "full fathom five", are taken from William Shakespeare's play The Tempest.

The single was scheduled for release in the US by Imperial Records in November 1968, but it remains unreleased there.

== Reception ==
Reviewing for New Musical Express, Derek Johnson wrote that "two tiny faults struck me – I wasn't very keen on the sombre monologue opening; and the routine is taken at such a frantic pace that, occasionally, one gets the impression of too many words being crammed into each line". But he also wrote that "in the main, this is fast-moving, punchy and electrifying". Chris Welch for Melody Maker wrote that "a furious rock beat prevails, and pressure rises throughout the voyage. Clever lyrics once again by the jolly tars from Hampstead, and a harpoon of a hit". For Record Mirror, Peter Jones wrote "interesting intro sets the scene, then that extremely distinctive vocal sound takes over, spearheaded by Dave himself. Easy melody line, good lyrics, usual high spirits… oh, yes, a hit".

== Track listing ==
1. "The Wreck of the 'Antoinette'" – 3:06
2. "Still Life" – 2:59

== Charts ==
Chart (1968–69)	Peak position
Australia (Kent Music Report)	48
Belgium (Ultratop 50 Flanders)	19
Germany (GfK)	21
Malaysia (Radio Malaysia)	5
New Zealand (Listener)	1
Rhodesia (Lyons Maid)	12
Singapore (Radio Singapore)	1
South Africa (Springbok Radio)	17
Sweden (Tio i Topp)	13
UK Singles (Official Charts)	14
