= Hard to Love You =

1966 single by Dave Dee, Dozy, Beaky, Mick & Tich

- Cover of the single released in Germany

Single by Dave Dee, Dozy, Beaky, Mick & Tich

from the album Dave Dee, Dozy, Beaky, Mick & Tich
- B-side: "No Time" "Frustration"
- Released: November 1966
- Recorded: April–May 1966
- Studio: Philips (London)
- Genre: Bubblegum pop; beat
- Length: 2:30
- Label: Star-Club; Fontana
- Songwriters: Ken Howard; Alan Blaikley
- Producer: Steve Rowland

Dave Dee, Dozy, Beaky, Mick & Tich singles chronology
| "Bend It!" (1966) | "Hard to Love You" (1966) | "Save Me" (1966) |

"Hard to Love You" is a song by English band Dave Dee, Dozy, Beaky, Mick & Tich, first released in June 1966 on their eponymous album. It was later released as a single in several countries.

== Release ==
"Hard to Love You" was only released as a single in Germany, the Netherlands and New Zealand. It was first released in Germany in November 1966, with the B-side "No Time", which had been released as the band's debut single in 1965. It was then released on 3 April 1967 in the Netherlands with the B-side "Frustration" and then in the same month it was released in New Zealand with "No Time" as the B-side. It became a top-ten hit in Germany and a top-twenty hit in New Zealand, whilst it failed to chart in the Netherlands.

== Track listing ==
7": Star-Club / 148 573 STF (Germany); Fontana / TF 267664 (New Zealand)

1. "Hard to Love You" – 2:30
2. "No Time" – 2:05

7": Fontana / 267 683 TF (Netherlands)

1. "Hard to Love You" – 2:30
2. "Frustation" – 2:34

== Charts ==
| Chart (1966–67) | Peak position |
|---|---|
| Germany (GfK) | 10 |
| New Zealand (Listener) | 17 |

== The Honeycombs version ==
"It's So Hard"

Single by The Honeycombs
- B-side: "I Fell in Love"
- Released: 15 July 1966
- Genre: Pop rock
- Length: 2:33
- Label: Pye
- Songwriters: Ken Howard; Alan Blaikley
- Producer: RGM Sound Production

The Honeycombs singles chronology
| "If You Should" (1966) | "It's So Hard" (1966) | "That Loving Feeling" (1966) |

=== Release ===
In July 1966, The Honeycombs released their version of the song with the title "It's So Hard". It was their penultimate single and it failed to chart.

Reviewing for New Musical Express, Derek Johnson wrote that the "change in style for the Honeycombs coincides with the introduction of three new members. Has a walloping stamp beat, reminiscent of Dave Clark, with rattling tambourine and twangy guitar".

=== Track listing ===
7": Pye / 7N 17138

1. "It's So Hard" – 2:33
2. "I Fell in Love" – 2:54
