= Don Juan (Dave Dee, Dozy, Beaky, Mick & Tich song) =

1969 single by Dave Dee, Dozy, Beaky, Mick & Tich

- Cover of the single released in Germany

Single by Dave Dee, Dozy, Beaky, Mick & Tich

from the album Together
- B-side: "Margareta Lidman"
- Released: 21 February 1969
- Recorded: 27 and 30 January 1969
- Studio: Lansdowne Studios, London
- Genre: Pop rock
- Length: 3:03
- Label: Fontana
- Songwriters: Ken Howard; Alan Blaikley
- Producer: Steve Rowland

Dave Dee, Dozy, Beaky, Mick & Tich singles chronology
"Run Colorado" (1969)	"Don Juan" (1969)	"Snake in the Grass" (1969)

"Don Juan'" is a song by Dave Dee, Dozy, Beaky, Mick & Tich, released as a single in February 1969. It peaked at number 23 on the UK Singles Chart.

== Inspiration and reception ==
The song takes its inspiration from Spanish bullfighting and from Georges Bizet's opera Carmen. The introduction is taken from Herb Alpert and the Tijuana Brass' "The Lonely Bull".

Reviewing for Melody Maker, Chris Welch explained the lyrics of the song: "Not so obvious is the story line, which they always try to make interesting and something of a documentary nature. This time the theme is of a matador hero who is betrayed in love and meets a gory end". For New Musical Express, Derek Johnson described "Don Juan" as a "raving up-beat saga" and that "no effort has been spared to simulate the atmosphere of the Corrida – exultant shouts of "Olé", fanfare trumpets, rippling Spanish guitars and an exotic rhythm that varies between flamenco and fandango". Peter Jones for Record Mirror described the song as "a sure-fire hit for Dave Dee, that well-known raver on the scene whose affinity with Don Juan is becoming more and more known. This is essentially a Spanish contribution to the team’s tour of the world, musically – a jolly, hard-hitting, brass-augmented sound which comes off immediately".

== Track listing ==
1. "Don Juan" – 3:03
2. "Margareta Lidman" – 2:17

== Charts ==
Chart (1969)	Peak position
Australia (Go-Set)	13
Australia (Kent Music Report)	15
Austria (Ö3 Austria Top 40)	7
Belgium (Ultratop 50 Flanders)	4
Belgium (Ultratop 50 Wallonia)	9
Germany (GfK)	22
Netherlands (Dutch Top 40)	2
Netherlands (Single Top 100)	3
New Zealand (Listener)	13
UK Singles (Official Charts)	23
