= Trevor Ward-Davies =

English bassist (1944–2015)

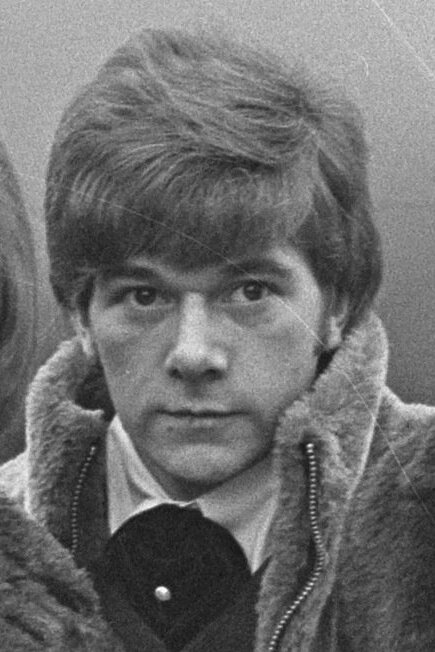
- Ward-Davies in 1967

Background information
- Also known as: Dozy
- Born: Trevor Leonard Ward-Davies; 27 November 1944; Enford, England
- Died: 13 January 2015 (aged 70) Devizes, England
- Genre: Pop
- Instruments: Bass guitar; vocals
- Years active: 1950s–2015
- Formerly of: Dave Dee, Dozy, Beaky, Mick & Tich

Trevor Leonard Ward-Davies (27 November 1944 – 13 January 2015), who went by the stagename Dozy, was an English pop bassist, who was an original member of Dave Dee, Dozy, Beaky, Mick & Tich from 1964 until his death in 2015.

== Career ==
In the 1950s, Davies formed "The Beatnicks" in Netheravon. He soon persuaded Ian Amey (Tich) to join the band, and Amey later on brought John Dymond (Beaky) into the group as well. David Harman (Dave Dee) started singing with them and were known as "Dave Dee and the Bostons". The lineup was complete when Davies met Michael Wilson (Mick) on a bus, and he joined on drums, replacing Stan Poole. When the band started touring in the UK and at the Star-Club in Hamburg, Germany, Trevor left his job working on a building site.

Trevor had acquired his nickname "Dozy" when the band were driving back from a gig in Southampton in the early 1960s, when he unwrapped a chocolate bar and instead of eating the chocolate and throwing away the wrapper, instead did the inverse: "We were travelling in the van and you could stop and put your money in a machine and get a bar of chocolate or a carton of milk. I was half-asleep and I stuffed the wrapper in my mouth and threw the chocolate out of the window. Someone called me Dozy and it stuck" (Davies said in an interview in 2001).

In 1964/65, they were discovered by Ken Howard and Alan Blaikley, and their band name was changed to Dave Dee, Dozy, Beaky, Mick & Tich, as they were their actual nicknames. During a performance on the television show Ready Steady Go!, Davies lost three of his front teeth after the end of Beaky's guitar hit him in the mouth. Their complicated Tongue twister name helped bring them attention on the radio, as disc jockeys would have a hard time attempting to say their name properly on air.

Their novel name, zany stage act and lurid dress sense helped to propel them to chart success with a string of hit singles penned by songwriters Ken Howard and Alan Blaikley including "Hold Tight!", "Bend It!" and "Zabadak!". Over the course of the band's career, they played several different genres, including freakbeat, mod and pop. Of their two million-copy selling single releases, "The Legend of Xanadu" reached number one in the UK Singles Chart. Unlike many other British bands of the 1960s who were associated with the British invasion of the United States, Dave Dee, Dozy, Beaky, Mick & Tich had limited commercial US success.

Dave Dee left in 1969 to pursue a solo career, and "Dave Dee" was removed from the band name. As "Dozy, Beaky, Mick & Tich", they had a minor hit with the Anti-Vietnam song "Mr. President" in 1970. They soon disbanded in 1973. In 1974, the original line-up of DDDBMT reunited for a single, "She's My Lady", with Dave Dee and Mason producing. Trevor continued to perform with Amey, Dymond, and Pete Lucas in a band called, "Tracker". In 1976, after "Tracker" broke up. He reunited Dozy, Beaky, Mick & Tich with the line-up of "Tracker". Now "Beaky" was drumming and Pete, under the name Mick, played guitar.

Trevor was in a Country and western duo called "Woodsmoke" and also wrote songs for other artist.

Dave Dee, Dozy, and Tich continued to tour with new "Mick" John Hatchman and different "Beaky" replacements. Dave Dee died in 2009, and John Dymond returned in 2013. Tich retired in 2014 and later died in 2024. When Davies died in 2015, Dymond continued touring and is the only original member in the current version of the band.

== Personal life ==
Trevor Leonard Ward-Davies was born in Enford in 1944. He was educated at the County Secondary Modern School at Durrington, Wiltshire. When he was 13, he went to see Buddy Holly and the Crickets performing in Salisbury. “I was young and impressionable,” Trevor later recalled, “and Buddy astounded me just by his very stage presence.” Trevor's first instrument was an acoustic guitar, then later an electric bass guitar. Trevor met his wife Yvonne when he was fourteen-years old in 1959. He married Yvonne at St Peter's Church in 1968.

== Death ==
Davies died at his home in Patney, near Devizes, on 13 January 2015, aged 70. His cause of death was cancer. He was survived by his wife, two children, five grandchildren, and a great-grandchild. Dozy played his last gig with DBMT at the Corn Exchange, Devizes on 13 December, at a charity event organised by friend of the band. A few days later, he fell ill with jaundice, brought on an illness in his liver, and his condition worsened after Christmas. Davies was not diagnosed with the liver cancer until a week before his death.

Former band mate Ian Amey (Tich) said Dozy was "a great bassist and a great mate over the years, he was loveable, likeable and always had a cheeky smile on his face, he was very good fun to be with, a very good friend for many, many years and he will be terribly missed, it was his band. It all started off with Dozy before it ever got to Dave Dee, Dozy, Beaky, Mick & Tich. He was loveable in a lot of ways, was his own person and did what he wanted to do". John Dymond (Beaky) said that Davies was a "lovely man".

According to his wife Yvonne, during their forty seven year marriage, the first and only time Trevor told her "I love you" was the night before his death. She said that he would never say it ("I love you"), and that "on that night (before his death), I said, ‘Love you,’ and he said, ‘Love you’ back, but then he added, ‘Now get us a fag'".

Trevor's funeral was at St John the Baptist Church, Inglesham on 26 January 2015. The surviving members of DDDBMT (Beaky, Mick, and Tich) were in attendance, as well as Chris Britton of The Troggs. According to Yvonne, the funeral was organised by Amey and was said by him to be "huge", and that people would be coming from Canada, France, the US, Germany and Spain. The funeral was originally going to be held in Charlton St Peter, but had to be moved when she was informed about the estimated number of people attending. A further private ceremony was held in Salisbury.

== Also ==
- Trevor Ward-Davies obituary
