= Okay! (Dave Dee, Dozy, Beaky, Mick & Tich song) =

1967 single by Dave Dee, Dozy, Beaky, Mick & Tich

- Cover of the single released in Germany

Single by Dave Dee, Dozy, Beaky, Mick & Tich
- B-side: "He's a Raver"
- Released: 12 May 1967
- Recorded: 4 April 1967
- Studio: Philips (London)
- Genre: Sunshine pop; pop rock
- Length: 2:37
- Label: Fontana
- Songwriters: Ken Howard; Alan Blaikley
- Producer: Steve Rowland

Dave Dee, Dozy, Beaky, Mick & Tich singles chronology
"Touch Me, Touch Me" (1967)	"Okay!" (1967)	"Zabadak!" (1967)

"Okay!" is a song by Dave Dee, Dozy, Beaky, Mick & Tich, released as a single in May 1967. It peaked at number 4 on the UK Singles Chart.

== Reception ==
Reviewing for Record Mirror, Peter Jones wrote that "there's a Russian approach to this" and "the scene builds well, into some jerky lyrics by the Howard Blaikley team. I don't say it's their strongest... but I do say it'll be around longer than most pop records". Penny Valentine for Disc and Music Echo wrote that the writers "really are getting to sound as though they plough through Israel and Russian folk music libraries week in week out before writing a new song. This has the inimitable team, Dave Dee, etc., singing as though they should be leaping about collective farms with much hey heying in fierce style". Melody Maker described it as "commercial, full of hang-ups, and a nice mystical chanting at the beginning, but then it clunks along at a rather boring pace, getting nowhere slowly".

== Track listing ==
7": Fontana / TF 830

1. "Okay!" – 2:37
2. "He's a Raver" – 2:06

7": Fontana / F-1591 (US)

1. "Okay" – 2:35
2. "Master Llewellyn" – 2:23

== Charts ==
Chart (1967–68)	Peak position
Australia (Kent Music Report)	57
Austria (Ö3 Austria Top 40)	3
Belgium (Ultratop 50 Flanders)	10
Belgium (Ultratop 50 Wallonia)	29
Denmark (Danmarks Radio)	10
Finland (Suomen virallinen lista)	21
Germany (GfK)	5
Ireland (IRMA)	7
Japan (Oricon Singles Chart)	3
Japan International (Oricon)	1
Netherlands (Dutch Top 40)	4
Netherlands (Single Top 100)	3
New Zealand (Listener)	10
Singapore (Radio Singapore)	1
Sweden (Kvällstoppen)	18
Sweden (Tio i Topp)	5
UK Singles (Official Charts)	4
