= Death Proof (soundtrack) =

2007 soundtrack album

Grindhouse: Death Proof

Soundtrack album by Various Artists
- Released: April 3, 2007
- Genres: Pop; film score; rock; hard rock
- Length: 38:30
- Labels: A Band Apart; Maverick; Warner Bros.
- Producer: Holly Adams

Professional ratings
Review scores
Source	Rating
AllMusic	4.5/5 stars
Empire	4/5 stars
Pitchfork	(6.8/10)
Rolling Stone	3.5/5 stars

Death Proof is the soundtrack to Death Proof, Quentin Tarantino's segment of the 2007 film Grindhouse. It also includes clips of dialogue from various scenes in the film.

== Track listing ==
No.	Title	Writer(s)	Artist(s)	Length
1.	"The Last Race (Note: Originally from the 1964 film Village of the Giants)"	Jack Nitzsche	Jack Nitzsche	2:39
2.	"Baby It's You"	Burt Bacharach; Mack David; Barney Williams	Smith	3:23
3.	"Paranoia Prima (Note: Originally from the 1971 film The Cat o' Nine Tails)"	Ennio Morricone	Ennio Morricone	3:19
4.	"Planning & Scheming" (Dialogue)		Eli Roth and Michael Bacall	1:00
5.	"Jeepster"	Marc Bolan	T. Rex	4:09
6.	"Stuntman Mike" (Dialogue)		Rose McGowan and Kurt Russell	0:19
7.	"Staggolee"	John Michael Hill; Charlie Allen	Pacific Gas & Electric	3:50
8.	"The Love You Save (May Be Your Own)"	Joe Tex	Joe Tex	2:56
9.	"Good Love, Bad Love"	Alvertis Isbell; Eddie Floyd	Eddie Floyd	2:11
10.	"Down in Mexico"	Jerry Leiber; Mike Stoller	The Coasters	3:22
11.	"Hold Tight!"	Ken Howard; Alan Blaikley	Dave Dee, Dozy, Beaky, Mick & Tich	2:47
12.	"Sally and Jack (Note: Originally from the 1981 film Blow Out)"	Pino Donaggio	Pino Donaggio	1:25
13.	"It's So Easy (Note: Originally from the 1980 film Cruising)"	Willy DeVille	Mink DeVille	2:10
14.	"Whatever-However" (Dialogue)		Tracie Thoms and Zoë Bell	0:36
15.	"Riot in Thunder Alley (Note: Originally from the 1967 film Thunder Alley)"	Richard Podolor	Eddie Beram	2:04
16.	"Chick Habit"	Serge Gainsbourg; April March	April March	2:07
Total length:				38:30

== Film tracks not on the soundtrack album ==
1. "Violenza Inattesa" – Ennio Morricone
2. "Gangster Story" – Guido & Maurizio De Angelis
3. "Italia a Mano Armata (Main Theme)" – Franco Micalizzi
4. "La polizia sta a guardare (Main Theme)" – Stelvio Cipriani
5. "Laisse Tomber Les Filles" (original French version of "Chick Habit") – April March
6. "Funky Fanfare" – Keith Mansfield
7. "Twisted Nerve" – Bernard Hermann

== Sales ==
Region	Certification	Certified units/sales
United States	—	103,000

== See also ==
- Planet Terror (soundtrack)
