= Save Me (Dave Dee, Dozy, Beaky, Mick & Tich song) =

1966 single by Dave Dee, Dozy, Beaky, Mick & Tich

- Cover of the single released in the Netherlands and Austria

Single by Dave Dee, Dozy, Beaky, Mick & Tich
- B-side: "Shame"
- Released: 2 December 1966
- Recorded: 8 November 1966
- Studio: Philips (London)
- Genre: Pop; Latin pop
- Length: 2:58
- Label: Fontana
- Songwriters: Ken Howard; Alan Blaikley
- Producer: Steve Rowland

Dave Dee, Dozy, Beaky, Mick & Tich singles chronology
"Hard to Love You" (1966)	"Save Me" (1966)	"Touch Me, Touch Me" (1967)

"Save Me" is a song by Dave Dee, Dozy, Beaky, Mick & Tich, released as a single in December 1966. It peaked at number 3 on the UK Singles Chart.

== Reception ==
Reviewing for New Musical Express, Derek Johnson wrote that the band "certainly believe in ringing the changes. This time they've abandoned the Bend in favour of an up-tempo, almost breathtaking, exotic Latin rhythm. It's a sort of bossa rumba, with a touch of Afro-Cuban thrown in for good measure". Reviewed in Record Mirror, it was described as "a powerful up-tempo belter, marked by clever drumming and piercingly exciting falsetto vocal work".

== Track listing ==
1. "Save Me" – 2:58
2. "Shame" – 2:05

== Charts ==
Chart (1966–67)	Peak position
Australia (Go-Set)	25
Australia (Kent Music Report)	22
Belgium (Ultratop 50 Flanders)	17
Belgium (Ultratop 50 Wallonia)	20
Canada Top Singles (RPM)	93
Denmark (Danmarks Radio)	11
Finland (Suomen virallinen lista)	33
Germany (GfK)	2
Ireland (IRMA)	14
Netherlands (Dutch Top 40)	10
Netherlands (Single Top 100)	8
New Zealand (Listener)	5
South Africa (Springbok Radio)	8
Sweden (Tio i Topp)	13
UK Singles (Official Charts)	3
