= Ian Amey =

English pop rock guitarist (1944–2024)

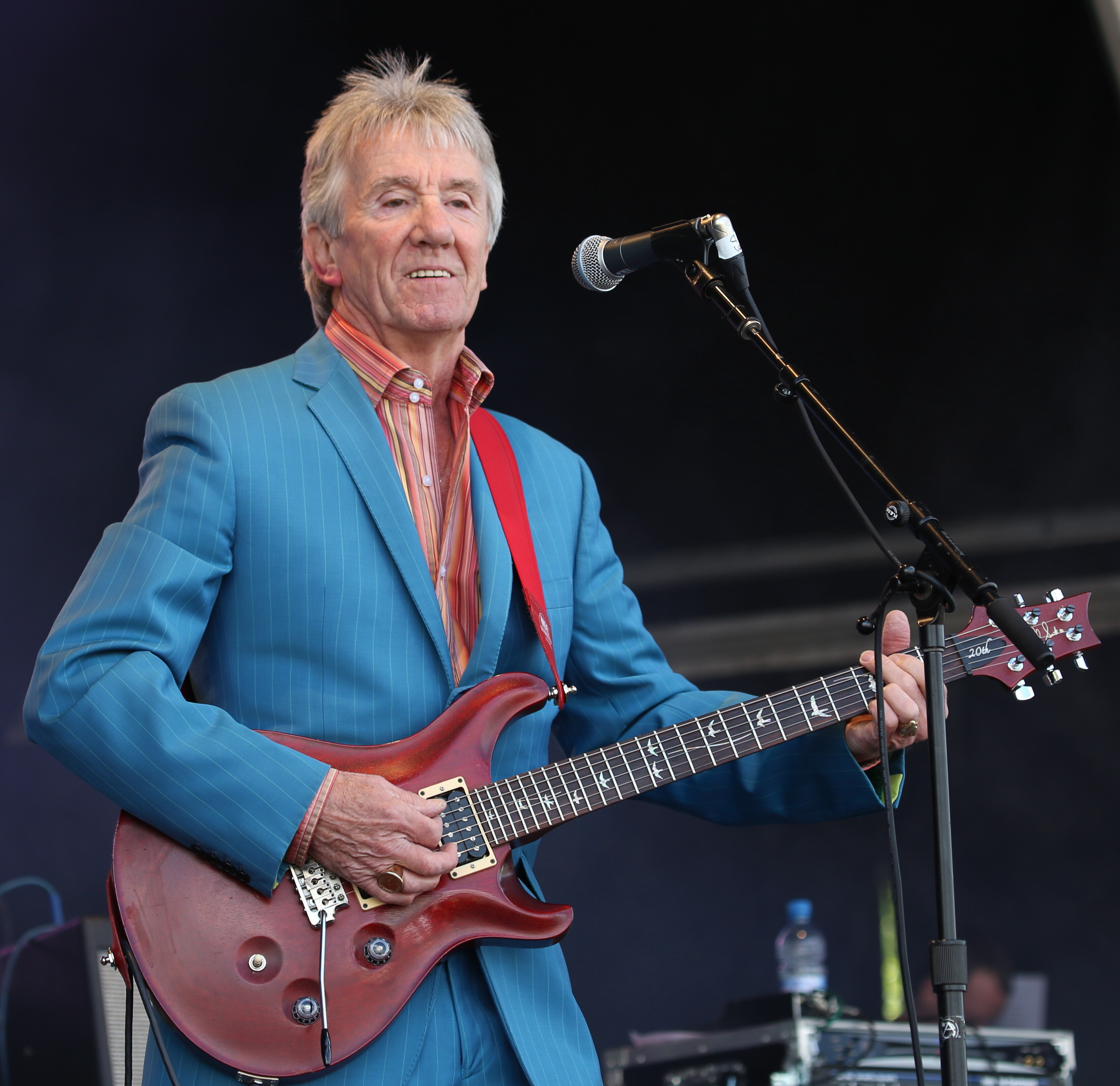
- Amey performing in 2013

Background information
- Also known as: Tich
- Born: Ian Frederick Stephen Amey; 15 May 1944; Salisbury, England, UK
- Died: 14 February 2024 (aged 79) Salisbury, Wiltshire, England, UK
- Genres: Pop, rock
- Instruments: Guitar; mandolin; flamenco guitar; vocals
- Works: Dave Dee, Dozy, Beaky, Mick & Tich discography
- Years active: 1950s–2014
- Formerly of: Dave Dee, Dozy, Beaky, Mick & Tich, The Troggs

Ian Frederick Stephen Amey (15 May 1944 – 14 February 2024), who went by the stagename Tich, was an English pop rock guitarist, who was a member of Dave Dee, Dozy, Beaky, Mick & Tich from 1964 until his retirement in 2014.

== Biography ==
=== Career ===
In the 1950s, Amey was a member of Eddy and the Strollers. He was then persuaded by Trevor Ward-Davies (Dozy) to leave that group to join Davies's group "The Beatnicks". Soon after, Amey persuaded John Dymond (Beaky) to join the Beatnicks. Amey, Davies, and Dymond constantly moved from one band to another, eventually meeting David Harman (Dave Dee). After Dozy met Michael Wilson (Mick) on a bus, he joined on drums and they became "Dave Dee and the Bostons".

The Bostons were approached by Ken Howard and Alan Blaikley, and they signed on to Fontana Records. Their name was changed to Dave Dee, Dozy, Beaky, Mick & Tich by the two composers, as according to Howard: "We changed their name to Dave Dee, Dozy, Beaky, Mick and Tich, because they were their actual nicknames and because we wanted to stress their very distinct personalities in a climate which regarded bands as collectives". Amey said: "Our name was given to us by our management at the time. Even all the DJs at the time had trouble saying it too including Kenny Everett who would stumble pronouncing it on purpose. I guess it helped us at the time". According to Beaky, Amey got the nickname "Tich" as he was significantly smaller amongst his peers growing up.

Their novel name, zany stage act and lurid dress sense helped to propel them to chart success with a string of hit singles penned by songwriters Ken Howard and Alan Blaikley including "Hold Tight!", "Bend It!" and "Zabadak!". Over the course of the band's career, they played several different genres, including freakbeat, mod and pop. Two of their single releases sold in excess of one million copies each, and they reached number one in the UK Singles Chart with the second of them, "The Legend of Xanadu". Unlike many other British bands of the 1960s who were associated with the British invasion of the United States, Dave Dee, Dozy, Beaky, Mick & Tich had limited commercial US success.

Amey was a multi-talented stringed instrument player, and is known for playing the mandolin on their hit "Bend It!", and plays flamenco guitar on "The Legend of Xanadu". In September 1969, Dave Dee left the group for a short-lived solo career. The rest of the band, re-billed as Dozy, Beaky, Mick & Tich, continued releasing records until they broke up in 1973. For a year after that, Amey and Dymond were members of the rock band "Mason" with Peter Mason, Bob Taylor, and Charles O'Brien - they released three singles between 1973 and 1974. When that band ended, he, Mason, and Robin Gair formed "Amey Gair Mason". They released one live album "Live at the Duck", that was taped at the Duck pub in Laverstock. Amey joined The Troggs in the 1970s when Chris Britton departed for a few years. Amey appears on their 1979 LP record "Wild Thing".

In 1974, the original line-up of Dave Dee, Dozy, Beaky, Mick & Tich reunited for a single, "She's My Lady", with Dave Dee and Mason producing. Amey and Beaky continued performing with Trevor Ward-Davies and Pete Lucas in a band called, "Tracker". In 1976, after "Tracker" broke up. Ian Amey reunited Dozy, Beaky, Mick & Tich with the line-up of "Tracker". Now "Beaky" was drumming and Pete, under the name Mick, played guitar.

Over the next decades, Tich, Dozy, and "Mick" replacement John Hatchman continued to tour as Dave Dee, Dozy, Beaky, Mick & Tich, with Dave Dee showing up occasionally at gigs when he wasn't busy with his work as an A&R manager for Atlantic Records, and as a record producer for Magnet Records. Dave Dee died in 2009, and in 2013, John Dymond returned to the band, and for the next year, the group had 3/5 of its original personnel.

=== Retirement and death ===
In 2014, Tich announced his retirement. He had been in the band consecutively since its inception in 1964. He was subsequently replaced by Jolyon Dixon, who in turn was replaced by Chris Moores in September 2020. Dozy died under a year later in January 2015, leaving Beaky as the only original member still touring in the group. According to Beaky, Amey still occasionally turned up to band rehearsals.

Amey died on 14 February 2024 at his home in Salisbury, Wiltshire, at the age of 79. He was survived by his wife of 55 years, Suzanne Amey (née Fryer), whom he married in December 1968, and their two children. His death was first announced on the official Facebook account for the band The Equals, run by rhythm guitarist and original member Pat Lloyd, who said: "The beauty of life is not in its permanence, but in the memories we create, the laughter we share, and the bonds we forge" As I post this, my heart is heavy with sadness with the devastating news of the passing of our dear friend and founding member of DDBMT the talented, unforgettable, Tich (Ian Amey). Everyone who knew Tich considered themselves lucky, myself included for over 55 years. In this sorrowful time, sending thoughts of comfort to his wife Sue, his children Leigh & Kristian and immediate family, not forgetting his extended band family past and present . May they find strength to get through the difficult days ahead. With love and remembrance, we share in your sorrow. Thank you Tich for your part in my journey. Fly high, shine bright, and go and jam with Dave and Dozy. Rest easy dear friend. Love, Pat."
