= Pete Lucas =

- Born: Peter Lucas; December 16, 1950 (age 75)
- Died: 16 December 2023 (aged 73) Bowerchalke, England, UK
- Genres: Pop, rock
- Instruments: Bass; guitar; vocals
- Years active: 1970s–2022
- Formerly of: Dave Dee, Dozy, Beaky, Mick & Tich, The Troggs

Peter Lucas (16 December 1950 – 16 December 2023) was a British bass guitarist, who was the bassist for The Troggs from 1984 to 2022, and "Mick" in Dave Dee, Dozy, Beaky, Mick & Tich from 1976 to 1982.

== Biography ==
=== Career ===
In the 1970s, Lucas was in a band called "Tracker" with Ian Amey and Trevor Ward-Davies, who were "Tich" and "Dozy" in Dave Dee, Dozy, Beaky, Mick & Tich. In 1976, the lineup of Tracker was arranged to be the new DDDBMT. Lucas became the new "Mick", which changed the usual name/instrument correlation, as originally, "Mick" was the drummer, and "Beaky" was the guitarist, but this was now inversed with Lucas as "Mick" on guitar. Lucas left DDDBMT in 1982, and two years later, joined The Troggs on bass.

=== Death ===
Lucas retired in 2022. Soon after, he was diagnosed with cancer, and spent most of his time in treatment at Salisbury Hospital, but was eventually allowed to return home to Bowerchalke, where he had lived since 1981.

Lucas died on 16 December 2023, his 73rd birthday. He was survived by his wife Cate and their son. His funeral was held at Salisbury Crematorium on 18 January 2024.
