= Antoinette (barque) =

1874 barque built in Nova Scotia

History
- Name: Antoinette
- Commissioned: 1874
- Stricken: 29 January 1889
- Reinstated: 10 August 1889
- Fate: Wrecked on Doom Bar 2 January 1895

General characteristics
- Type: Barque
- Tonnage: 1118 (net)
- Sail plan: Square rig Ship

The Antoinette was a 1,118 ton barque, built in Yarmouth, Nova Scotia in 1874 and was used for the transportation of goods. She struck land on Tuckernuck in 1889, requiring the entire crew to be rescued. Although she was reinstated later that year, she was finally wrecked on the Doom Bar on the north coast of Cornwall; the largest ship to be wrecked there. The majority of the wreck ended up on the Town Bar off Padstow and mostly disappeared after being destroyed with gelignite. However some of the hull re-emerged in March 2010, creating a hazard to local shipping.

== History ==
In 1874, JM Gardenor officially launched the Antoinette, from Yarmouth, Nova Scotia. The ship was originally owned by J Bingay, but was subsequently sold to Dennis & Doane, W Law and finally R Elkin.

== Tuckernuck ==
The Antoinette struck the Nantucket Shoal near Tuckernuck Island on 27 January 1889. Early on the following morning a lifeboat from United States Life-Saving Service, manned by four brothers, managed to rescue everyone aboard. The New York Times explains that this feat was all the more impressive as two people rescued were women. She was towed to port, and eventually reinstated on 10 August 1889.

== Fate ==
On New Years Day 1895, the Antoinette set off from Newport laden with coal, destined for Brazil. She foundered near Lundy Island, losing sections of her mast. She was towed towards a safe port, but broke free and drifted. Eventually, she broke up, with a large portion of the wreck lodging on the Doom Bar at the mouth of the Camel Estuary on the rugged north Cornwall coast. All fourteen crew and three stranded pilots were rescued.

Although attempts by three tugs from Cardiff to remove the largest piece of the wreck were unsuccessful, the next spring tide carried it up the estuary onto Town Bar, opposite the port of Padstow, where it was a hazard to shipping. A miner named Pope was called in to remove it: he manoeuvred a box filled with gelignite underneath the wreck and detonated it after clearing the area. The resulting explosion was so violent that reports claim every window in the nearby harbour of Padstow was blown in and the smoke could be seen three miles (5 km) away.

In March 2010, due to shifting sands, a wreck was uncovered on Town Bar, which the harbour master believed to be the Antoinette. Being near to a navigational channel, it was considered to still be a hazard to shipping. The Royal Navy Bomb Disposal Unit failed to demolish it so it was marked with a buoy; in March 2011 further work, using saws, was started to make it safe.

== In popular culture ==
- In September 1968 British group Dave Dee, Dozy, Beaky, Mick and Tich released a single called "The Wreck of the 'Antoinette'" about the doomed romance between a girl and a fictionalized member of the ship's crew who drowned in the sinking.
