= Flaming Youth (band) =

1960s English rock band

Flaming Youth were a British rock band, active in the late 1960s. They were not commercially successful and are now remembered primarily as Phil Collins' first band that had a recording contract.

== Career ==
In 1969, American singer John Walker, of the Walker Brothers, toured in England, and was accompanied by keyboardist Brian Chatton, bassist Gordon "Flash" Smith, guitarist Ronnie Caryl and drummer Phil Collins. After the tour, they decided to go on together, calling themselves Hickory, and recorded a single in 1969, "Green Light/The Key".

The group met songwriters Ken Howard and Alan Blaikley, who were looking for a band to record an album they were working on, so they changed their name to Flaming Youth. They released the album Ark 2 in 1969. In November, New Musical Express reported that the concept album was the subject of an hour-long television special, which the group had filmed in the Netherlands. The LP was released on Fontana Records in the UK to some critical but no commercial success. There was also a follow-up single recorded, "Man, Woman, and Child". The band had difficulty getting gigs; organist Rod Mayall (John Mayall's brother) briefly joined the band before they broke up in early 1970.

== Aftermath ==
Collins and Caryl together auditioned for Genesis the following year and Collins joined the band. Although Caryl did not pass his audition, he played at a concert with them at Aylesbury just before they recruited Steve Hackett. Caryl later played with Collins as rhythm guitarist on his solo tours.

After he left Flaming Youth, Chatton joined Jackson Heights with Lee Jackson, bassist and singer of The Nice, along with multi-instrumentalist John McBurnie. They recorded three albums together. Chatton's solo album Playing for Time featured Collins on drums.

== General and cited references ==
- Coleman, Ray (1997). Phil Collins: The Definitive Biography. London: Simon & Schuster. pp. 54–58. ISBN 9780684817842. OCLC 39184279.
- Negrin, Dave (29 May 2005). "One Step at a Time: An Interview with Ronnie Caryl". The World of Genesis. Archived from the original on 24 November 2005.
