= Hold Tight (Dave Dee, Dozy, Beaky, Mick & Tich song) =

"Hold Tight!"
- Swedish picture sleeve

Single by Dave Dee, Dozy, Beaky, Mick & Tich

from the album Dave Dee, Dozy, Beaky, Mick & Tich
- B-side: "You Know What I Want"
- Released: 11 February 1966
- Recorded: 11 January 1966
- Studio: Philips (London)
- Genre: Hard rock
- Length: 2:47
- Label: Fontana
- Songwriters: Ken Howard; Alan Blaikley
- Producer: Steve Rowland

Dave Dee, Dozy, Beaky, Mick & Tich singles chronology
"You Make It Move" (1965)	"Hold Tight!" (1966)	"Hideaway" (1966)

"Hold Tight!" is a song by Dave Dee, Dozy, Beaky, Mick & Tich. The song was recorded on 11 January 1966 at Fontana's studio in Marble Arch, London, and released as a single in February 1966. It was included on the band's debut album, issued on 24 June 1966 and is well-remembered for its particularly distorted, heavy sound.

The song reached number 4 on the UK Singles Chart. This was their first top ten hit, also reaching number 27 on the Australian Kent Music Report and number 8 on the New Zealand Singles Chart. The song did not chart on the US Billboard Hot 100, with the band achieving limited success in America.

The song was used in the soundtrack to the 2007 Quentin Tarantino film Death Proof, in which Jungle Julia (Sydney Tamiia Poitier) requests the song, calling in to the radio station for which she works. She erroneously refers to the band as "Dave Dee, Dozy, Beaky, Mitch and Tich".

It is based on a rhythm used as a chant by football fans.

A Spanish language version, "Apriétalo", was released by the Mexican group Los Belmonts, achieving great success in Latin America.

An Italian language version, "Chi Sei?", by I Monelli, was used in a UK TV advertisement in 2023 by EasyJet.

== Reception ==
Reviewing for New Musical Express, Derek Johnson wrote that "the stamping drum opening sounds like a Dave Clark disc – then in comes a grating rasp guitar and plonking bass, to build the rhythm to a pitch before the vocals start. The song itself goes up, line by line, in octaves – so that Dave Dee, Dozy, Beaky, Mick and Tich are in falsetto at the end of each stanza". For Record Mirror, Peter Jones described the song as a "highly effective hit-parade follow-up with a beat based on a current clapping craze at football grounds".

== Charts ==
Chart (1966)	Peak position
Australia (Kent Music Report)	21
Canada Top Singles (RPM)	52
Germany (GfK)	4
New Zealand (Listener)	8
South Africa (Springbok Radio)	7
Sweden (Kvällstoppen)	15
Sweden (Tio i Topp)	7
UK Singles (Official Charts)	4
