= Planet Terror (soundtrack) =

2007 soundtrack album

Grindhouse: Planet Terror

Soundtrack album by Robert Rodriguez
- Released: April 3, 2007
- Genre: Film score; hard rock
- Length: 43:00
- Label: Varèse Sarabande
- Producer: Robert Rodriguez

Robert Rodriguez film soundtrack chronology
The Adventures of Sharkboy and Lavagirl in 3-D (2005)	Grindhouse: Planet Terror (2007)	Shorts (2009)

Professional ratings
Review scores
Source	Rating
Empire	4/5 stars

The soundtrack to Planet Terror (Robert Rodriguez's segment of Grindhouse) was released by Varèse Sarabande on April 3, 2007 from Varèse Sarabande, though the score managed to sell on iTunes a week early. Rodriguez revealed at Comic-Con 2006 that John Carpenter was in talks to compose the score, but decided not to write it, with Rodriguez eventually taking over. Inspiration for his score came from music composed by Carpenter; he said that during the filming of Planet Terror, Carpenter's music was often played on set. The soundtrack features two songs performed by Rose McGowan: a cover of the 1952 song "You Belong to Me" and the original songs "Useless Talent #32" and "Two Against the World". It also includes Nouvelle Vague's cover of Dead Kennedys' 1981 single "Too Drunk to Fuck".

== Track listing ==
No.	Title	Writer(s)	Artist(s)	Length
1.	"Grindhouse (Main Titles)"	Robert Rodriguez	Robert Rodriguez	3:30
2.	"Doc Block"	Ro. Rodriguez; Carl Thiel	Robert Rodriguez & Carl Thiel	2:03
3.	"The Sickos"	Ro. Rodriguez; Graeme Revell	Robert Rodriguez & Graeme Revell	1:39
4.	"You Belong to Me"	Chilton Price; Pee Wee King; Redd Stewart	Rose McGowan	2:15
5.	"Go Go Not Cry Cry"	Ro. Rodriguez; Rick Del Castillo	Robert Rodriguez & Rick Del Castillo	1:09
6.	"Hospital Epidemic"	Ro. Rodriguez; Revell	Robert Rodriguez & Graeme Revell	1:16
7.	"Useless Talent #32"	Rebecca Rodriguez; Ro. Rodriguez	Rose McGowan	3:11
8.	"His Prescription... Pain"	Ro. Rodriguez; Thiel	Robert Rodriguez & Carl Thiel	0:55
9.	"Cherry Darling"	Ro. Rodriguez	Robert Rodriguez	1:01
10.	"The Grindhouse Blues"	Ro. Rodriguez	Robert Rodriguez	3:01
11.	"El Wray"	Ro. Rodriguez	Robert Rodriguez	1:18
12.	"Police Station Assault"	Ro. Rodriguez	Robert Rodriguez	1:33
13.	"Dakota"	Ro. Rodriguez; Thiel	Robert Rodriguez & Carl Thiel	2:27
14.	"Zero to Fifty in Four"	Ro. Rodriguez	Robert Rodriguez	1:35
15.	"Fury Road"	Ro. Rodriguez	Robert Rodriguez	2:03
16.	"Helicopter Sicko Chopper"	Ro. Rodriguez; Revell	Robert Rodriguez & Graeme Revell	1:22
17.	"The Ring in the Jacket"	Ro. Rodriguez; George Oldziey	Robert Rodriguez & George Oldziey	1:34
18.	"Killer Legs"	Ro. Rodriguez; Del Castillo	Robert Rodriguez & Rick Del Castillo	2:14
19.	"Melting Member"	Ro. Rodriguez; Revell	Robert Rodriguez & Graeme Revell	1:51
20.	"Too Drunk to Fuck"	Jello Biafra	Nouvelle Vague	2:12
21.	"Cherry's Dance of Death"	Ro. Rodriguez	Chingon	3:26
22.	"Two Against the World"	Re. Rodriguez; Ro. Rodriguez	Rose McGowan	2:08
Total length:				43:00

== Personnel ==
- Robert Rodriguez – acoustic and electric guitars
- Rick Del Castillo – acoustic and electric guitars
- Michael Hardwick – lap steel guitar
- David Russo – keyboards, guitar
- Carl Thiel – piano, keyboards, rhythm guitar, bass, drums, vibraphone
- Brannen Temple – drums
- Johnny Reno – saxophone
- Rebecca Rodriguez – backing vocals
- Alex Ruiz – backing vocals

== See also ==
- Death Proof (soundtrack)
