= Ark 2 (album) =

Studio album by Flaming Youth
- Released: October 1969
- Studio: De Lane Lea Music, Soho, London
- Genre: Rock
- Length: 43:32
- Label: Fontana
- Producer: Ken Howard; Alan Blaikley

Ark 2 is the only studio album by the short lived British rock band Flaming Youth. It was released in October 1969 by Fontana Records, and was written and produced by the songwriting team of Ken Howard and Alan Blaikley. Its concept, inspired by the media attention to the 1969 Moon landing, tells the story of man's evacuation from a burning Earth and its journey into space. Each member of the band sings a lead vocal. It was drummer Phil Collins' first major label recording.

== Overview ==
The original British pressing excludes Howard and Blaikley's names in the liner notes, but they are included in the US pressing. The lead single from the album was "From Now On".

The band premiered the album with a performance at the London Planetarium. They performed a five-song set for the Dutch television broadcaster TROS, broadcast on 14 May 1970. The set included: "Earthglow", "Weightless", "Changes", "Space Child", and "From Now On (Immortal Invisible)". Both the music and vocals were mimed, and it is the only known footage of Flaming Youth to exist.

After the band split in early 1970, Collins went on to join the rock band Genesis.

The album has since been reissued several times. In 2023, Ark 2 was reissued by the French label Musea Records. This is a new remaster with the two bonus tracks "Man, Woman and Child" and "Drifting".

The concept for the album and some of the songs were reworked into the rock opera for BBC1, co-written with Melvyn Bragg, Orion.

== Critical reception ==
The album received some critical praise in the music press. Melody Maker listed the album as "Pop Album of the Month", calling it "adult music beautifully played with nice tight harmonies". Disc and Music Echo said "there is some splendid music on this very good first album". The rock press of the time was even more favourable and it was awarded Sunday Times Rock Album of the Year in 1969.

Despite the positive critical reaction, the album and single were not commercially successful and did not chart.

== Track listing ==
No.	Title	Vocals	Length
1.	"Guide Me Orion"	(Flash) Gordon Smith	3:18
2.	"Earthglow"	Brian Chatton and Smith	2:54
3.	"Weightless"	(instrumental)	2:38
4.	"The Planets": a. "Mars – Bringer of War" (Vocal: Flaming Youth); b. "Venus – Bringer of Peace" (Vocal: Chatton); c. "Mercury – The Winged Messenger" (Vocal: Flaming Youth); d. "Jupiter – Bringer of Jollity" (Vocal: Phil Collins); e. "Saturn – Bringer of Old Age" (Vocal: Collins); f. "Uranus – The Magician" (Vocal: Chatton); g. "Neptune – The Mystic" (Vocal: Ronnie Caryl)"		12:49
5.	"Changes"	Collins, Smith	5:47
6.	"Pulsar"	Chatton, Smith	3:07
7.	"Space Child"	Collins	5:11
8.	"In the Light of Love"	Flaming Youth	3:27
9.	"From Now On (Immortal Invisible)"	Chatton	4:21

=== 1996 reissue ===
No.	Title	Length
10.	"Man, Woman and Child"	3:14
11.	"Drifting"	3:52

== Personnel ==
Flaming Youth

- (Flash) Gordon Smith – vocals, guitar, 12-string guitar, bass
- Ronnie Caryl – vocals, 12-string guitar, bass
- Brian Chatton – vocals, organ, piano
- Phil Collins – vocals, drums, percussion

Production

- John Constable – stained glass montage photo
- Gered Mankowitz – photography
- Barry Ainsworth – recording
- Howard Blaikley – writer
