= Zabadak! (song) =

1967 single by Dave Dee, Dozy, Beaky, Mick & Tich

- Cover of the single released in the Netherlands and Austria

Single by Dave Dee, Dozy, Beaky, Mick and Tich

from the album If No-One Sang
- B-side: "The Sun Goes Down"
- Released: 29 September 1967
- Recorded: 6 September 1967
- Studio: Chappell Studios, London
- Genre: Psychedelic pop
- Length: 3:35
- Label: Fontana
- Songwriters: Ken Howard; Alan Blaikley
- Producer: Steve Rowland

Dave Dee, Dozy, Beaky, Mick and Tich singles chronology
"Okay!" (1967)	"Zabadak!" (1967)	"The Legend of Xanadu" (1968)

"Zabadak!" is a song by British musical group Dave Dee, Dozy, Beaky, Mick and Tich, written by Ken Howard and Alan Blaikley. It was released as a single in September 1967, peaking at number 3 on the UK Singles Chart and becoming the group's only single to chart on the Billboard Hot 100, peaking at number 52. It was their fifth of seven to chart in Canada.

The song uses pseudo-African style percussion (created in the studio by the group) and a nonsense lyric in its repetitive chorus, to highlight the meaning of its two verses (sung in English). This use of an African motif was typical of the group's dabbling with other world styles of music, such as the Latin style of "Save Me" and the Greek style of "Bend It!"

The group also recorded a version of "Zabadak!" in Italian, which was released as a single there backed with an Italian-language version of "Save Me". However, the single failed to chart. Both tracks were later included as bonus tracks on the 2003 CD release of If No-One Sang.

It was revealed in 2025 by Beaky that Andy Bown of The Herd sang the low vocals on the song.

== Reception ==
Reviewing for New Musical Express, Derek Johnson described "Zabadak" as "loaded with appeal and yet completely different from anything they have previously waxed. The basic influences are a blend between Afro-Cuban and Peruvian Incan. Add to this a catchy and continually-repeated chorus, some very attractive counter-harmonies, a pulsing beat with throbbing conga drums, and a lush string section in the background – plus a haunting tune that nags at the brain – and you've got a Hit". Billboard wrote that this "African flavored rhythm item has much of the feel of "Pata Pata". In a guest column for Disc and Music Echo, Radio Caroline DJ Johnnie Walker praised "Zabadak!" as "a well-produced record and a different sound".

== Track listing ==
7": Fontana / TF 873

1. "Zabadak!" – 3:35
2. "The Sun Goes Down!" – 2:48

7": Star-Club / 148 595 STF (Germany)

1. "Zabadak" – 3:35
2. "Nose for Trouble" – 4:01

== Charts ==
=== Weekly charts ===
Chart (1967–68)	Peak position
Australia (Go-Set)	32
Australia (Kent Music Report)	43
Austria (Ö3 Austria Top 40)	6
Belgium (Ultratop 50 Flanders)	4
Belgium (Ultratop 50 Wallonia)	16
Canada Top Singles (RPM)	1
Denmark (Danmarks Radio)	19
Germany (GfK)	6
Ireland (IRMA)	7
Malaysia (Radio Malaysia)	6
Netherlands (Dutch Top 40)	3
Netherlands (Single Top 100)	4
New Zealand (Listener)	4
Rhodesia (Lyons Maid)	4
South Africa (Springbok Radio)	13
Sweden (Kvällstoppen)	13
Sweden (Tio i Topp)	6
UK Singles (Official Charts)	3
US Billboard Hot 100	52
US Cash Box Top 100	56

=== Year-end charts ===
Chart (1968)	Position
Canada RPM	22

== Cover versions ==
- In 1967, German pianist Horst Jankowski released an instrumental version of the song on his album And We Got Love.
- In 1967, British band The Sorrows released an Italian-language version of the song as a single only in Italy.
- In 1979, German band Saragossa Band released a cover of the song as a single, which peaked at number 6 in Germany and number 8 in Austria.
- In 1980, German organist Franz Lambert released an instrumental version on his album Pop-Orgel-Hit-Parade 6.
- In 2000, Czech band Těžkej Pokondr released a Czech-language version, titled "Zabávať", on their album Ježek v peci.
- In 2008, German band beFour included a version on their album We Stand United
