= Eve Taylor =

English music manager (1915–1983)

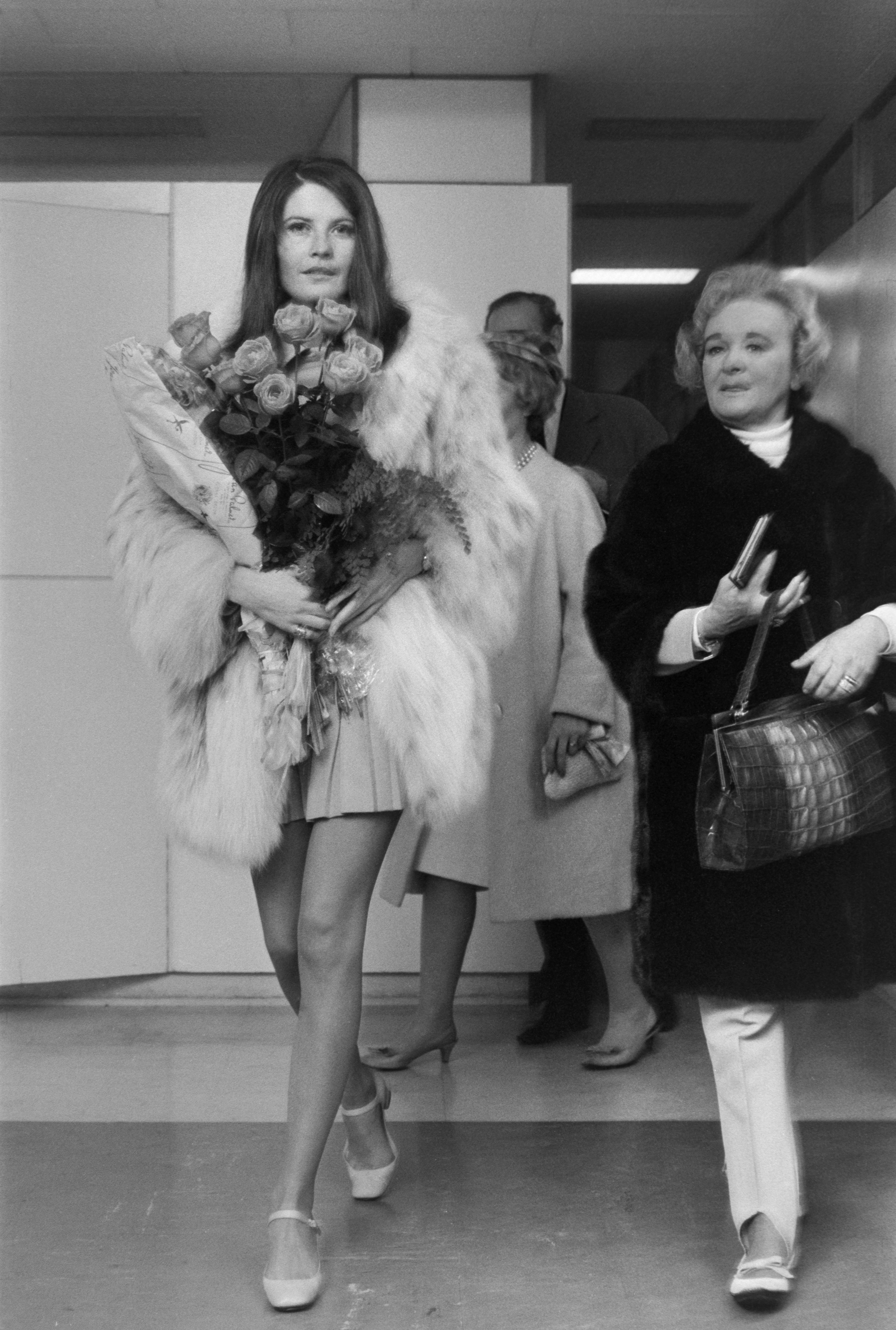
- Eve Taylor (to the right) with Sandie Shaw in 1967.
- Born: Evelyn Henshall; 28 February 1915; London, England
- Died: 31 August 1983 (aged 68); London, England
- Occupations: Music manager, agent, variety performer
- Years active: 1930s–1970s

Eve Taylor (born Evelyn Henshall, 28 February 1915 – 31 August 1983) was a British talent manager, notable as one of the early female music managers. She managed singers Adam Faith, Sandie Shaw and Val Doonican, and composer John Barry, among others.

== Early life ==
She was born in London in 1915. Her father, William Henshall, was a well-known show business impresario, and her mother, born Evelyn Taylor, was a music hall artiste. During the 1930s, Eve Henshall worked as a foil to comedian Sid Field, credited as "Sue Brett", before becoming part of a comedy and tap-dancing act.

== Career ==
She married in 1941, but after the deaths of both her mother and her first husband in the early 1950s, she adopted her mother's maiden name, Taylor, and moved into show business management. Together with agent Maurice Press, whom she married in 1958, they set up the talent agency Starcast Ltd. in London. Among their early clients were novelty whistler Des Lane, comedians Mike and Bernie Winters, and rock and roll singer Jackie Dennis.

She briefly managed Larry Grayson (while he was known as Billy Breen) and is credited with being the source of his catchphrase "shut that door!" as several of her clients revealed that whenever she wanted to discuss money or personal issues with her clients, she would always take them aside and tell them to "shut that door". From 1959 to 1961, Taylor also managed the Lana Sisters, who included Mary O'Brien prior to her adoption of the stage name Dusty Springfield. Her other management clients included composer John Barry, singers Val Doonican, Jackie Trent, and Peter Gordeno, and Ready Steady Go! choreographer Patrick Kerr.

Known in the 1960s as the "Queen Bee of Show Business", she is best remembered for her management of singers Adam Faith and Sandie Shaw. Taylor's management of Adam Faith commenced following Faith's introduction to her by John Barry. Taylor immediately changed Faith's image and appearance, and initially believed that Faith should concentrate on acting, rather than singing. When she appreciated that his records were becoming popular, Taylor enhanced popular interest by intimating that Faith would be issuing no more recordings, in favour of concentrating on his acting career. Taylor's initial relationship with John Barry was used to the benefit of Faith. With the encouragement of Eve Taylor, Adam Faith's successful early records were compositions by John Barry and lyricist Johnny Worth. When Faith began to perform regularly onstage, backed by John Barry's group, The John Barry Seven, he also heeded Eve Taylor's advice that he make separate, solo appearances, so that his musical career was not perceived to be tied to that of Barry. In 1961, at the age of twenty-one, Adam Faith signed a ten-year management contract with Eve Taylor, renegotiating previous contracts that had been signed by his parents. The term of the contract was at Taylor's suggestion; Faith had originally wanted a longer contract.

Adam Faith discovered singer Sandie Shaw in 1964 when, at the age of sixteen, Shaw performed with Faith at a charity concert. Faith then introduced Shaw to his manager, Eve Taylor. Within two weeks, Taylor had obtained a contract for Shaw with Pye Records, and had also made an agreement with songwriter Chris Andrews to write for Shaw. Sandie Shaw's singles were produced by Eve Taylor, Chris Andrews and Sandie Shaw (uncredited), with help from Pye Records arranger Ken Woodman. It was Taylor who persuaded Shaw to enter the Eurovision Song Contest, where she won for Great Britain in 1967, with the song "Puppet on a String". Taylor also disclosed to Shaw that, despite Taylor being the manager of both Sandie Shaw and Adam Faith, Adam Faith had been taking a percentage of most of Shaw's earnings and had an interest in most of the publishing rights to her songs. Taylor was also responsible for rejecting "It's Not Unusual" to be sung by Sandie Shaw, which instead became the first international hit for Tom Jones. The song was written for Sandie Shaw by Les Reed and Gordon Mills, and was rejected by Eve Taylor, based on hearing the demo version, as sung by Tom Jones.

Both Shaw and Faith eventually ended their professional relationships with Taylor acrimoniously, and both criticised Taylor openly in TV interviews and in their respective biographies. In the 1997 UK Channel 4 series BritGirls, during the episode focussing on Shaw, Faith described Taylor as "emotionally violent" and said she would threaten to end her clients' careers if they did not accept her demands. Shaw does concede in her autobiography, The World at My Feet, that she was saddened when she learned of Taylor's death after many years without contact.

== Death ==
Taylor died in 1983, and was buried in what Shaw described as "an uncelebrated plot in a Jewish cemetery in North London".
