= Jolyon Dixon =

British musician (born 1973)

- Born: Jolyon Keith Dixon; 6 December 1973 (age 52); Salisbury, England
- Genres: Pop, rock
- Occupations: Musician, songwriter
- Instruments: Guitar, vocals
- Years active: 1990s-present
- Formerly of: Dave Dee, Dozy, Beaky, Mick & Tich

Jolyon Keith Dixon (born 6 December 1973) is an English guitarist and a member of Rachel Fuller's band. He played guitar on The Who's 2006 album Endless Wire.

== Biography ==
Dixon was born in Salisbury, Wiltshire, and began playing guitar at the age of nine. He has been a professional guitarist since 1993, playing for artists such as Toyah Willcox (Take the Leap, 1993 and subsequent tours), Voice of the Beehive (Sex and Misery, 1995), Scarlet (Naked, 1995 and Chemistry, 1996, including hit single "Independent Love Song"), Judie Tzuke (Under the Angels, 1996 and Songs 2, 2008), and Mark Owen (Green Man, 1996 and subsequent tours, hit singles "Child" and "Clementine", also How the Mighty Fall tour, 2005/6 and mixed audio for Live at the Academy DVD, 2006).

Dixon was a founding member of President Records, signing Rorschach from 1998 to 2002, and he produced, engineered and mixed their album Needles and Pins, Shotguns and Skins. In 2004, he began playing for Rachel Fuller, contributing to her album Cigarettes and Housework and performing at her live shows. It was through Fuller that Dixon met Pete Townshend, and since then he has played on numerous recordings with both Townshend and Fuller. As a producer/mixer, Dixon has worked on many releases, and as a session guitarist he has worked alongside producers such as John Leckie, Chris Thomas, Vic Coppersmith-Heaven, Craig Leon, Neil Perry and Pete Townshend. Dixon was guitarist with Melodramatic Records/Vertigo artist Amy Macdonald, contributing to her 2007 platinum selling the UK number one album This is the Life which sold in excess of three million copies, and was number one in five European countries, and also Macdonald's second album, A Curious Thing which was number one in three European countries and also topped the pan-European charts. As well as playing guitar, Dixon mixed the bonus live disc on the deluxe edition of A Curious Thing. He was the guitarist in Macdonald's touring band from the outset of her career until the end of 2009, and was also her musical director for her 2009 touring schedule.

Dixon is an endorsee of James Trussart guitars and Blackstar Amplification. He was also a member of The Last 55's, along with twins Christie and Louise Miller and Stuart Ross.

Dixon now lives in Salisbury, Wiltshire. He joined the remaining members of Dave Dee, Dozy, Beaky, Mick & Tich on guitar for their 2019 concerts.

Dixon plays with John Illingworth Smith as Illingworth. The duo have been writing and producing music together for 28 years. In early 2020, they decided to create a brand-new album during the months of lockdown. New...Normal was released in September 2020.

In January 2019, Dixon played guitar for a live performance of "Blackbird" by the Beatles, as part of Rachel Fuller 's "Animal Requiem" concert in St. James Church, Piccadilly, London, joined by Alfie Boe on lead vocals, and accompanied by the Royal Philharmonic Orchestra and Chamber Choir of London. He also played the song on October 26, 2019, at another performance of "Animal Requiem", at Royce Hall, UCLA, this time with Pete Townshend on vocals.

In 2023, Dixon played guitar on Townshend 's first solo single in 29 years, "Can't Outrun the Truth". Released on March 24, 2023, the single featured artwork by Damien Hirst, with proceeds going to the Teenage Cancer Trust. Dixon is the only other credited performer aside from Townshend.

In 2024, Dixon contributed guitar playing to the soundtrack album for Rachel Fuller and Pete Townshend 's musical The Seeker (an adaptation of the Hermann Hesse novel Siddhartha). The album also features Elton John, Emeli Sande, layton Williams, Nakhane, Sunidhi Chauhan and the Royal Philharmonic Orchestra. He also played solo guitar at the premier live performance of the musical, which took place on November 6, 2024, at the Theatre Royal Drury Lane, London, featuring the Royal Philharmonic Orchestra, Chamber Choir of London, Townshend, Alfie Boe, Layton Williams Sunidhi Chauhan and Nakhane.

In 2025, Dixon played guitar on the soundtrack for Quadrophenia-a Mod Ballet, scored by Rachel Fuller and performed by the Sadler's Wells Theatre company. On February 26, 2025, he performed "Love Reign O'er Me" alongside Townshend for a charity Gala Event at Saddlers Wells East Theatre, London, as a preview for the ballet.

On Saturday November 14th 2026, Jolyon was awarded the "Lifetime Achievement Award" at the 2nd Annual Wiltshire Music Awards, in Melksham, Wiltshire.
