= Dave Dee =

English singer-songwriter (1941–2009)

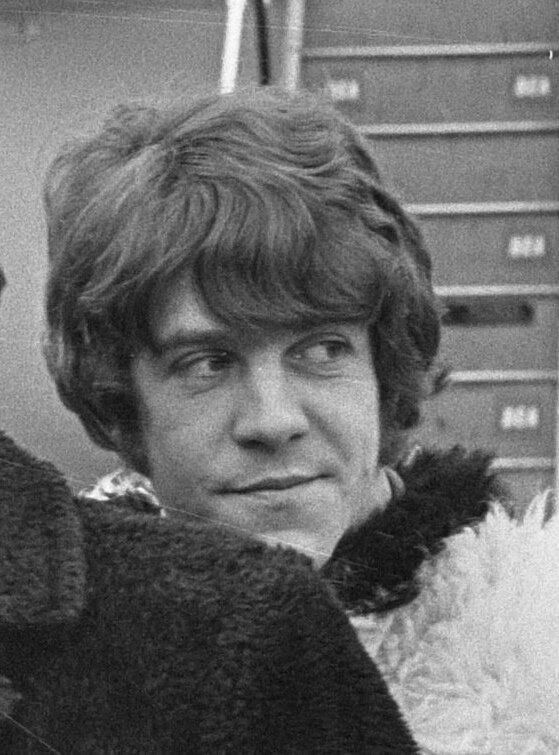
- Dee in 1967

Background information
- Born: David John Harman; 17 December 1941; Salisbury, Wiltshire, England
- Died: 9 January 2009 (aged 67) Kingston upon Thames, Surrey, England
- Genres: Pop; rock; beat
- Occupations: Musician; singer-songwriter; A&R manager; businessman; fundraiser
- Instruments: Vocals; guitar
- Years active: 1962–2009
- Label: Various
- Formerly of: Dave Dee, Dozy, Beaky, Mick & Tich
- Website: dddbmt.com

David John Harman, known professionally as Dave Dee (17 December 1941 – 9 January 2009), was an English singer-songwriter, musician, A&R manager, fundraiser and businessman. He was the frontman for the 1960s pop band Dave Dee, Dozy, Beaky, Mick & Tich.

== Early life ==
Dave Dee was born in Salisbury, Wiltshire, and attended Adcroft School of Building, Trowbridge. Upon leaving school he became a police cadet with the Wiltshire Constabulary. He was one of the first on the scene of the April 1960 car crash that resulted in the death of American rock and roll musician Eddie Cochran and serious injury to Gene Vincent. He later recounted that he started learning to play the guitar using Cochran's impounded Gretsch over several nights at the station.

== Dave Dee, Dozy, Beaky, Mick and Tich ==
Harman's professional career as a singer began in the early 1960s when he formed the group Dave Dee and The Bostons with friends Trevor Ward-Davies, John Dymond, Michael Wilson, and Ian Amey. As The Bostons, they toured the UK and Germany and were a support act to The Honeycombs in 1964. Known for their variety act, which included comedy routines and risque comments interspersed amongst the song, they were then discovered by Ken Howard and Alan Blaikley. After a disastrous audition for Joe Meek which resulted in Meek throwing his coffee all over his studio in a fit of rage due to the group not wanting to comply with his demands, the group signed on to Fontana Records, and changed their name to Dave Dee, Dozy, Beaky, Mick & Tich. According to their producer Ken Howard: "We changed their name to Dave Dee, Dozy, Beaky, Mick and Tich, because they were their actual nicknames and because we wanted to stress their very distinct personalities in a climate which regarded bands as collectives".

The band’s first major-selling record was "Hold Tight". The song peaked at number four on the Official Singles Chart (OSC) and the song was performed on shows such as Top of the Pops, Blue Peter and Beat-Club. Their other top-ten UK hits included "Hideaway", "Bend It!", "Save Me", "Okay!", "Zabadak!" and "Last Night in Soho". They also scored a number one hit in the UK Singles Chart in 1968 with "The Legend of Xanadu".

Dee left the band to become a solo artist in September 1969. He eventually reunited with Dozy, Beaky, Micky and Tich for a 1974 single, and then later produced (but did not appear on) a 1979 single done by the DBMT quartet. Harman returned to DDDBMT in 1982; however, when the group decided to migrate to Marbella in Spain in 1987, he refused to move, and left the group. When the group returned to England again after only two years, Harman again began performing live gigs with them again; however, he did not return to the group as a permanent member, and would occasionally appear at concerts. He continued to record occasionally both with DDDBMT and as a solo act.

== Solo ==
Soon after leaving the group in 1969, he released the single "My Woman's Man" which reached No. 42 in the UK and No. 58 in Australia. He issued six further solo singles through the end of 1971, all of which failed to chart, and played a Hells Angel in the Marty Feldman comedy film Every Home Should Have One in 1970. He also played himself (billed as 'Record Executive') in the 1980 Sex Pistols mockumentary film The Great Rock 'n' Roll Swindle. He issued his only solo album, Unfinished Business, in 1995.

=== Marmalade & Dave Dee ===
Beginning in 1987, when DDDBMT had moved to Spain, and Dee was left on his own, Harman began frequently collaborating with the Scottish band Marmalade. This collaboration was responsible for two Dave Dee record releases. In 1989 they released the single "Scirocco" as Marmalade & Dave Dee. Although not an official member, Dave Dee would continue to guest-appear at concerts from then onwards until his death.

== Business career ==
After a few charting songs, he then retired from performing and became an A&R manager for Atlantic, Magnet and WEA Records, during which period he was at least partly responsible for their signing AC/DC, Boney M and Gary Numan.

In 1980, Harman opened and ran a short-lived record company called Double D Records, at 25 Bruton Street in London. Double D Records was also distributor for Pye Records, and it produced twelve singles between 1980 and 1981.

Dee also became a businessman and founder committee member for disadvantaged children through the charity Nordoff–Robbins, which he helped found and worked with for over 30 years.

== Personal life ==
Dee became a magistrate. In his later years, he lived in Mobberley, Cheshire, and fathered twin sons and a daughter. He was married to Joanne Parris when he died.

Dee suffered from prostate cancer from early 2001, but he continued to perform with his band almost until his death from the disease in Kingston Hospital, Surrey, on 9 January 2009. He was 67.
