= Patrick Kerr (dancer) =

British dancer and choreographer

Patrick Kerr (20 February 1941 – 15 August 2009) was a British dancer and choreographer who introduced and demonstrated dances on the influential TV show Ready Steady Go!.

Born in London, Kerr played guitar in local bands before establishing a career as a dancer with his partner and future wife, Theresa Confrey. They appeared on television and then accepted an offer to perform on cruise ships travelling to the US. Returning to Britain in 1963, TV producer Elkan Allan hired them to demonstrate some of the latest dance crazes on his new show, Ready Steady Go!. Initially with Confrey, he performed a new dance each week, some being new American dances and others being based on those seen in British clubs or the products of his own imagination.

After a brief spell as a recording artist under the management of Eve Taylor, he returned to Ready Steady Go! as a dancer and co-presenter with Cathy McGowan. He and Theresa Confrey also set up a boutique, Hem and Fringe, in Pimlico. When the TV show ended in 1966, Kerr joined a version of pop group The Ivy League for a while. In 1978, he and Confrey set up a dance studio in Cambridge. The initiative was successful, and developed into the Bodywork Company Dance Studio, aimed primarily at training dancers and singers for theatre shows and musicals.

Kerr died in 2009, aged 68.
