= Bend It! =

1966 single by Dave Dee, Dozy, Beaky, Mick & Tich

- Dutch picture sleeve

Single by Dave Dee, Dozy, Beaky, Mick & Tich

from the album If Music Be the Food of Love... Prepare for Indigestion
- B-side: "She's So Good"
- Released: 9 September 1966
- Recorded: 9 August 1966
- Studio: Philips (London)
- Genre: Beat; Greek
- Length: 2:29
- Label: Fontana
- Songwriters: Ken Howard; Alan Blaikley
- Producer: Steve Rowland

Dave Dee, Dozy, Beaky, Mick & Tich singles chronology
"Hideaway" (1966)	"Bend It!" (1966)	"Hard to Love You" (1966)

"Bend It!" is a song by English pop band Dave Dee, Dozy, Beaky, Mick & Tich, released as a single by Fontana on 9 September 1966. Written by the band's management team Ken Howard and Alan Blaikley, the song's Greek flavour and tempo changes garnered comparisons to Mikis Theodorakis's composition "Zorba's Dance". Though considered a departure from the "big-beat" style of the band's previous hits, "Bend It!" was a major chart success. It peaked at number 2 on the UK Singles Chart and had combined sales of over a million in the UK and Europe.

== Composition ==
The song is notable for its Greek style, inspired by "Zorba's Dance" from the 1964 film Zorba the Greek, which includes a bouzouki that quickens in tempo. For "Bend It!", an electric mandolin was used, with the result coming from experimenting during rehearsals. It represented a departure in sound for the band; Dave Dee told Record Mirror the band couldn't have recorded "another thump-thump thing", adding "we won't be angry if this isn't a hit because at least we'll have tried something new".

== Release ==
"Bend It!" was released with the B-side "She's So Good", written by Dave Dee, Dozy, Beaky, Mick and Tich. However, in Germany it was released by Star-Club Records with the B-side "You Make It Move", which had been released the previous year as the band's third single. The song peaked at number 2 on the UK Singles Chart for two weeks, ultimately spending twelve weeks on the chart. It reached number 1 in Germany, New Zealand and South Africa.

The song's salacious lyrics caused controversy and upon its release in America in October, numerous radio stations banned the song. This led the band to re-record "Bend It!" with altered lyrics. This version was then rush-released at the end of October and the original version was withdrawn. The new release came with an open letter of apology stating that "As a pop group we have no right or wish to set ourselves up as arbiters of public taste or morals. But neither would we want to be viewed in any way as corrupters of these standards. Our two countries are so close in most things that it is always surprising to find the exceptional cases where meaning and innuendo differ between us". The song was promoted with a "Bend It!" dance. The dance, created by Ready Steady Go! dancer and choreographer Patrick Kerr, was promoted in music magazines and an instruction guide inlay was included with the song's sheet music.

== Reception ==
Reviewed in Record Mirror, "Bend It!" was described as "in many ways the best the boys have yet done. It's unusual, with a speeding-up tempo and a fine set of lyrics". In the US, reviewing the original release, Billboard wrote that "this left-field rhythm novelty with fascinating arrangement should meet with equal success in the U.S." and Cash Box wrote that it "features a tricky, chugging, locomotive rhythm and an excellent sound" and that it also "stands an excellent chance to smash through Stateside".

== Charts ==
Chart (1966–67)	Peak position
Australia (Go-Set)	16
Australia (Kent Music Report)	6
Austria (Ö3 Austria Top 40)	2
Belgium (Ultratop 50 Flanders)	16
Belgium (Ultratop 50 Wallonia)	22
Canada Top Singles (RPM)	94
Denmark (Danmarks Radio)	8
Germany (GfK)	1
Ireland (IRMA)	3
Netherlands (Dutch Top 40)	4
Netherlands (Single Top 100)	4
New Zealand (Listener)	1
Rhodesia (Lyons Maid)	1
South Africa (Springbok Radio)	1
Sweden (Kvällstoppen)	5
Sweden (Tio i Topp)	2
UK Singles (Official Charts)	2
US Bubbling Under the Hot 100 (Billboard)	110
