= Every Home Should Have One =

1970 British film by Jim Clark

- Directed by: Jim Clark
- Screenplay by: Marty Feldman; Barry Took; Denis Norden
- Story by: Herbert Kretzmer; Milton Shulman
- Produced by: Ned Sherrin
- Starring: Marty Feldman; Judy Cornwell; Shelley Berman
- Cinematography: Ken Hodges
- Edited by: Ralph Sheldon
- Music by: John Cameron
- Color process: Eastmancolor
- Production companies: Example Productions Ltd; British Lion Films Ltd
- Distributed by: British Lion Films Ltd
- Release date: 5 March 1970 (London)
- Running time: 94 minutes
- Country: United Kingdom
- Language: English

Every Home Should Have One (U.S. title: Think Dirty ) is a 1970 British comedy film directed by Jim Clark and starring Marty Feldman. The screenplay was by Marty Feldman, Barry Took and Denis Norden, based on a story by Herbert Kretzmer and Milton Shulman. The film ridicules the then ongoing campaign organised by Mary Whitehouse against gratuitous sex in British entertainment and advertising.

== Plot ==
An advertising man is assigned by his boss to come up with a sexy new image for Mrs McLaughlin's Frozen Porridge. While his wife runs a clean-up-TV campaign organized by the local vicar, he has an affair with the au-pair girl.

The various porridge advertising campaigns get more and more extreme: the most relevant being the Goldilocks and the Three Bears campaign. This leads to a secondary campaign to search for "Miss Goldilocks."

== Cast ==
- Marty Feldman as Teddy Brown
- Judy Cornwell as Liz Brown
- Garry Miller as Richard Brown, their son
- Shelley Berman as Nat Kaplan
- Hy Hazell as Mrs. Kaplan
- Julie Ege as Inga Giltenburg
- Penelope Keith as Lotte von Gelbstein
- Moray Watson as Chandler
- Jack Watson as McLaughlin
- Mark Elwes as Rokes
- Harold Innocent as Jimpson
- Dinsdale Landen as Reverend Geoffrey Mellish
- John McKelvey as Colonel Belper
- Charles Lewsen as Arthur Soames
- Maggie Jones as Hetty Soames
- Frances de la Tour as Maude Crape
- Patrick Cargill as Wallace Trufitt, MP
- Patience Collier as Mrs. Monty Levin
- Annabel Leventon as Chandler's secretary
- Sarah Badel as Joanna Snow
- John Wells as Tolworth
- Michael Bates as magistrate
- Dave Dee as Wednesday Play star
- Judy Huxtable as Frankenstein heroine
- Alan Bennett as counsel in court (uncredited)

== Production ==
The film's titles and animated sequences were provided by Richard Williams.

The film was produced at Shepperton Studios in England.

== Soundtrack ==
The film theme song, "Every Home Should Have One," was written by John Cameron, Caryl Brahms, and Ned Sherrin, arranged by Alan Tew, produced by Jackie Rand, and sung by Millicent Martin. The song was released as a single to promote the film.

== Reception ==
=== Box office ===
The film was one of the most popular movies in 1970 at the British box office. However according to Sidney Gilliat who was on the board at British Lion, the film lost money. Producers Ned Sherrin and Terry Glinwood later formed Virgin Films.

=== Critical response ===
The Monthly Film Bulletin wrote: "This feature debut by Jim Clark... is a strictly hit-and-miss affair which reveals, once again, the dangers of trying to be fashionably contemporary and satirical at the same time. Most of the cast... are encouraged to punch away at everything in sight, which results in a good deal of unfunny mugging."

The Radio Times Guide to Films gave the film 1/5 stars, writing: "This dismal comedy... boasts a top-notch comic cast. But their efforts are totally overshadowed by a shambolic, leering performance from Feldman, making his second screen appearance, as a mad advertising executive who devises a series of steamy commercials for a brand of frozen porridge."

Leslie Halliwell said: "Tiresomely frenetic star comedy with the emphasis on smut."
