= Paul Overy =

British art historian and critic

Paul Vivian Overy (14 February 1940 – 7 August 2008) was a British art historian and critic who was an authority on De Stijl.

== Selected publications ==
- Edouard Manet, 1967
- De Stijl, 1969 - Studio Vista
- De Stijl, 1991 - Thames & Hudson
- Kandinsky: The Language of the Eye, 1969
- The Rietveld Schröder House, 1988 (co-author)
- The Complete Furniture of Gerrit Rietveld, 1993 (co-author)
- Light, Air and Openness, Modern Architecture Between the Wars, 2008.
