= The Legend of Xanadu =

- Cover of the single released in the Netherlands and Austria

Single by Dave Dee, Dozy, Beaky, Mick & Tich

from the album If No-One Sang
- B-side: "Please"
- Released: 9 February 1968
- Recorded: 17 January 1968
- Studio: Philips, London
- Genre: Psychedelic pop
- Length: 3:35
- Label: Fontana (UK); Imperial (US)
- Songwriters: Ken Howard; Alan Blaikley
- Producer: Steve Rowland

Dave Dee, Dozy, Beaky, Mick & Tich singles chronology
"Zabadak!" (1967)	"The Legend of Xanadu" (1968)	"Last Night in Soho" (1968)

"The Legend of Xanadu" is a single by Dave Dee, Dozy, Beaky, Mick & Tich that reached number one in the UK Singles Chart in 1968 and was the group's biggest hit. It was written by songwriters Ken Howard and Alan Blaikley. As was the case with many of the group's recordings, it features novelty elements—a trumpet section and whipcrack type sound in the chorus. The musical accompaniment was directed by John Gregory. The single was certified gold in November 1968.

The sound of the whip was actually the sound of two pieces of wood slapping together combined with Tich doing a pick slide.

== Reception ==
Reviewing for Disc and Music Echo, Penny Valentine wrote: "Having taken us on a round tour of Israel, Russia and goodness knows where else the gentlemen are now thundering across the prairies with this sort of Marty Robbins/Elmer Bernstein piece, Alpert trumpets, whiplash and all!" She also described the song as "very spirited, a lot better than they've done for a long time".

== Charts ==
Chart (1968)	Peak position
Australia (Go-Set)	6
Australia (Kent Music Report)	6
Austria (Ö3 Austria Top 40)	6
Belgium (Ultratop 50 Flanders)	6
Belgium (Ultratop 50 Wallonia)	10
Canada Top Singles (RPM)	10
Canada (CHUM)	7
Denmark (Danmarks Radio)	4
Finland (Suomen virallinen lista)	20
Germany (GfK)	5
Ireland (IRMA)	1
Israel (Galei Tzahal)	1
Japan (Oricon Singles Chart)	11
Japan International (Oricon)	1
Malaysia (Radio Malaysia)	2
Netherlands (Dutch Top 40)	5
Netherlands (Single Top 100)	5
New Zealand (Listener)	1
Norway (VG-lista)	3
Rhodesia (Lyons Maid)	1
Singapore (Radio Singapore)	1
South Africa (Springbok Radio)	7
Spain (Promusicae)	20
Sweden (Kvällstoppen)	4
Sweden (Tio i Topp)	1
UK Singles (Official Charts)	1
US Bubbling Under the Hot 100 (Billboard)	123

== Cover versions ==
- In 1968, Japanese band The Jaguars released a cover of the song as a single, which peaked at number 20 on the Oricon Singles Chart.
- In 1968, Spanish band Los Mustang released a Spanish-language version, titled "La leyenda de Xanadú", which peaked at number 18 on the Spanish Singles Chart.
- In 1992, the song was covered by English band the Fall for the NME various artists compilation album Ruby Trax.

== References in popular culture ==
- In Red Dwarf episode "Timeslides" (Season 3, Episode 5), an alternative dimension sees Dave Lister rich and living in a mansion named Xanadu; "not as a reference to the film Citizen Kane, but rather as a tribute to the hit single by Dave Dee, Dozy, Beaky, Mick and Tich".
