= Peter Jones (journalist) =

British journalist and author

- Born: Peter Langley Jones; 6 January 1930; Carshalton, Surrey, England
- Died: 10 July 2015 (aged 85); England
- Occupations: Journalist, author, promoter, presenter

Peter Langley Jones (6 January 1930 – 10 July 2015) was a British journalist, author, editor, promoter and presenter who wrote mainly on show business matters, especially pop music, for magazines including Record Mirror and Billboard. He was involved in the early careers of both The Rolling Stones and The Beatles, pseudonymously writing the first book-length biographies of both bands.

== Biography ==
He was born in Carshalton, Surrey. After his father died, he moved with his mother and her second husband to Portsmouth, where he started his career as a reporter for the Portsmouth Evening News. He began to specialise in show business interviews, before leaving the newspaper to work as a trainee screenwriter and talent booker for Associated London Scripts, where he worked with such stars as Frankie Howerd, Spike Milligan and Eric Sykes. He left to begin writing a regular column for the Weekend magazine, which in the mid-1950s had a reported circulation of 1.5 million.

As well as writing in a freelance capacity for Weekend, Record Mirror and other magazines, he appeared regularly on Southern TV's sports programmes during the early 1960s. In 1963, after seeing the Rolling Stones perform at the Crawdaddy Club in Richmond, he recommended them to Andrew Loog Oldham, who became their manager as a result. He actively championed Motown music before it became popular in the UK; John Schroeder, who brokered the first distribution deal for Motown in Britain, said of Jones that he was his only ally in promoting the release of early Motown material.

In 1964, Jones was appointed as editor of Record Mirror, at the time one of the three main national music weeklies in the UK, and during the 1960s and early 1970s wrote hundreds of articles on pop music for the journal. He also wrote extensively in The Beatles Book monthly magazine, under the pseudonym Billy Shepherd, and in the Rolling Stones' magazine, as Peter Goodman. He wrote the first book-length biographies of both bands: The True Story of the Beatles (as Shepherd, 1964), and the Stones' Our Own Story (as Goodman, 1965). He supported and encouraged the early careers of such stars as Dusty Springfield, The Who, and, later, Jimi Hendrix. He also wrote biographies of Elvis Presley and Tom Jones, and was the ghostwriter of newspaper columns for many British pop stars in the 1960s, including Sandie Shaw and Dave Dee, and for footballers including George Best and Denis Law.

After Billboard purchased Record Mirror in 1969, Jones continued to write for both publications, and for Music Week. He launched another magazine, Easy Listening, in 1972. For Billboard, he was successively news editor for British, European and international coverage and, finally, special issues editor, based in its London office. He also contributed to the publication, The Story of Rock, and regularly broadcast on music news for Südwestrundfunk in Baden-Baden, Germany, while continuing to work for Billboard until 1997.

He died of heart failure in 2015, aged 85.
