= Dave Dee, Dozy, Beaky, Mick & Tich =

British band

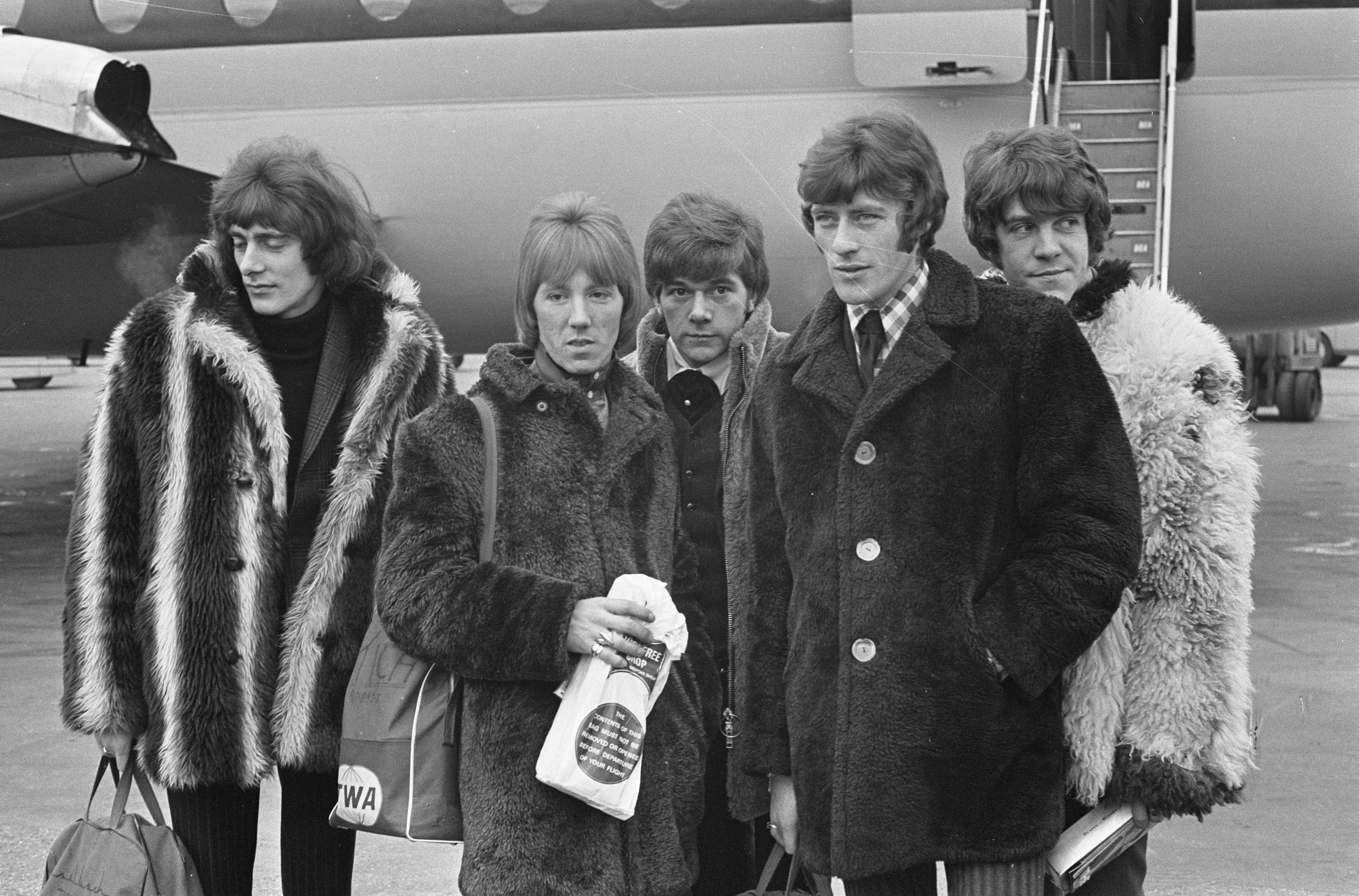
- L–R: Beaky, Tich, Dozy, Mick, Dave Dee (1967)

Background information
- Also known as: Dave Dee and the Bostons; Dozy, Beaky, Mick & Tich
- Origin: Salisbury, England
- Genres: Beat; rock; freakbeat; mod; pop
- Years active: 1964–present
- Labels: UK: Fontana Records; NA: Fontana, Imperial; FRG: Star-Club Records
- Members: John Hatchman; Paul Cornwell; Chris Moores; Adrian Fountain
- Past members: David Harman; Trevor Ward-Davies; John Dymond; Paul Bennett; Tony Carpenter; Michael Wilson; Pete Lucas; Ian Amey; Jolyon Dixon
- Website: dddbmt.com

Dave Dee, Dozy, Beaky, Mick & Tich are an English rock band most notably active during the 1960s. Formed in Salisbury in 1964, the band consisted of David Harman (Dave Dee), Trevor Ward-Davies (Dozy), John Dymond (Beaky), Michael Wilson (Mick) and Ian Amey (Tich). Their novel name, zany stage act and lurid dress sense helped propel them to chart success with a string of hit singles penned by songwriters Ken Howard and Alan Blaikley including "Hold Tight!", "Bend It!" and "Zabadak!". Over the course of the band's career, they played several different genres, including freakbeat, mod and pop. Two of their single releases sold in excess of one million copies each, and they reached number one in the UK Singles Chart with the second of them, "The Legend of Xanadu". Unlike many other British bands of the 1960s who were associated with the British invasion of the United States, Dave Dee, Dozy, Beaky, Mick & Tich had limited commercial United States success. They did better in Canada, with seven songs in the top 100.

Since their original break-up in 1973, the band has reunited in various formations. All but the original "Mick" have since returned to the band, with the remaining four continuing without him. Dave Dee came to gigs occasionally until his death in 2009; following his death, they dropped the "Dave Dee" from the band name out of respect. Until the mid-2010s, Dozy and Tich led the band consistently until Tich's retirement in 2014 (and eventual death in 2024) and Dozy's death in January 2015. The band continued to tour, being regular guests on UK based sixties nostalgia circuits, with John "Beaky" Dymond, who returned in 2013; Dymond died in 2026, and the band decided to carry on with Adrian Fountain filling in Dymond's place, leaving no original members in the band. The original Mick, Michael Wilson, is the only living original member of the group.

== History ==
The group began in the late 1950s when "the Dozies" came together from various bands of the Salisbury area. Trevor Davies (Dozy), then with the Beatnicks met Ian Amey (Tich) and persuaded him to leave his group Eddy and the Strollers to join the Beatnicks. A few months later David Harman (Dave Dee) from the Coasters and Boppers came in and Tich approached his schoolmate John Dymond (Beaky) who also was a member of the Big Boppers to join in as well.

Davies, Amey, and Harman would all be members of a group called Ronnie Blonde and the Beatnicks. They gigged extensively already with a repertoire of classic rockers and contemporary hits plus a few of their own numbers. One night their front man Ronnie did not show up and Dave ended up doing most of the lead vocals and eventually became the group's front man.

The group's drummers would continuously change but finally around Christmas 1961 when Michael Wilson (Mick) whom Dozy had met while travelling on the bus, joined as their permanent drummer. With this new lineup, they changed their name to Dave Dee and the Bostons. They soon gave up their jobs (Dave Dee was a policeman) to make their living from music. Apart from performing in the UK, they occasionally played in Hamburg (Star-Club, Top Ten Club) and in Cologne (Storyville).

Before leaving the Wiltshire police force, vocalist Dave Dee attended the scene of the motoring accident in which the American rock and roller Eddie Cochran was killed and Gene Vincent was injured in April 1960.

In summer 1964, the British songwriters Ken Howard and Alan Blaikley became interested in recording them. The band was set up in the studio to make recordings with Joe Meek. These recording sessions failed to get off the ground. Dave Dee stated that Meek "had very strange recording techniques. He wanted us to play the song at half speed and then he would speed it up and put all these little tricks on it. We said we couldn't do it that way. He exploded, threw coffee all over the studio and stormed up to his room. His assistant [Patrick Pink] came in and said, 'Mr Meek will not be doing any more recording today'. That was it. We lugged all our gear out and went back home". The group eventually gained a recording contract with Fontana Records.

Ken Howard said that: "We changed their name to Dave Dee, Dozy, Beaky, Mick and Tich, because they were their actual nicknames and because we wanted to stress their very distinct personalities in a climate which regarded bands as collectives". The distinctive name, coupled with well produced and catchy songs by Howard and Blaikley, quickly caught the UK public's imagination and their records started to sell in abundance. The group made the odd tour 'down under' to Australia and New Zealand, where they had also experienced some marked chart success.

"Mick" is short for "Michael". "Tich" was shorter than his friends as a child, "Beaky" was because of the size of his nose, and "Dozy" supposedly originated from Trevor Ward-Davies mistakenly throwing away a bar of chocolate and trying to eat the wrapper.

They also scored a number one hit in the UK Singles Chart in 1968 with "The Legend of Xanadu". The combined sales figures were in excess of one million copies. Their other top-ten UK hits included "Hideaway", "Hold Tight!", "Bend It!", "Save Me", "Okay!", "Zabadak!" and "Last Night in Soho".

"Bend It!" was a big hit in Europe, including number one in Germany. To obtain a bouzouki sound on the recording, an electrified mandolin was used. The song was inspired by music from the film sound track of Zorba the Greek. The combined UK and European sales were over one million. However, in October 1966, the British music magazine NME commented that dozens of US radio stations had banned the record, because the lyrics were considered too suggestive. The group responded by recording a new version in London with a different set of words, which was rush-released in the US, as the original single was withdrawn from sale.

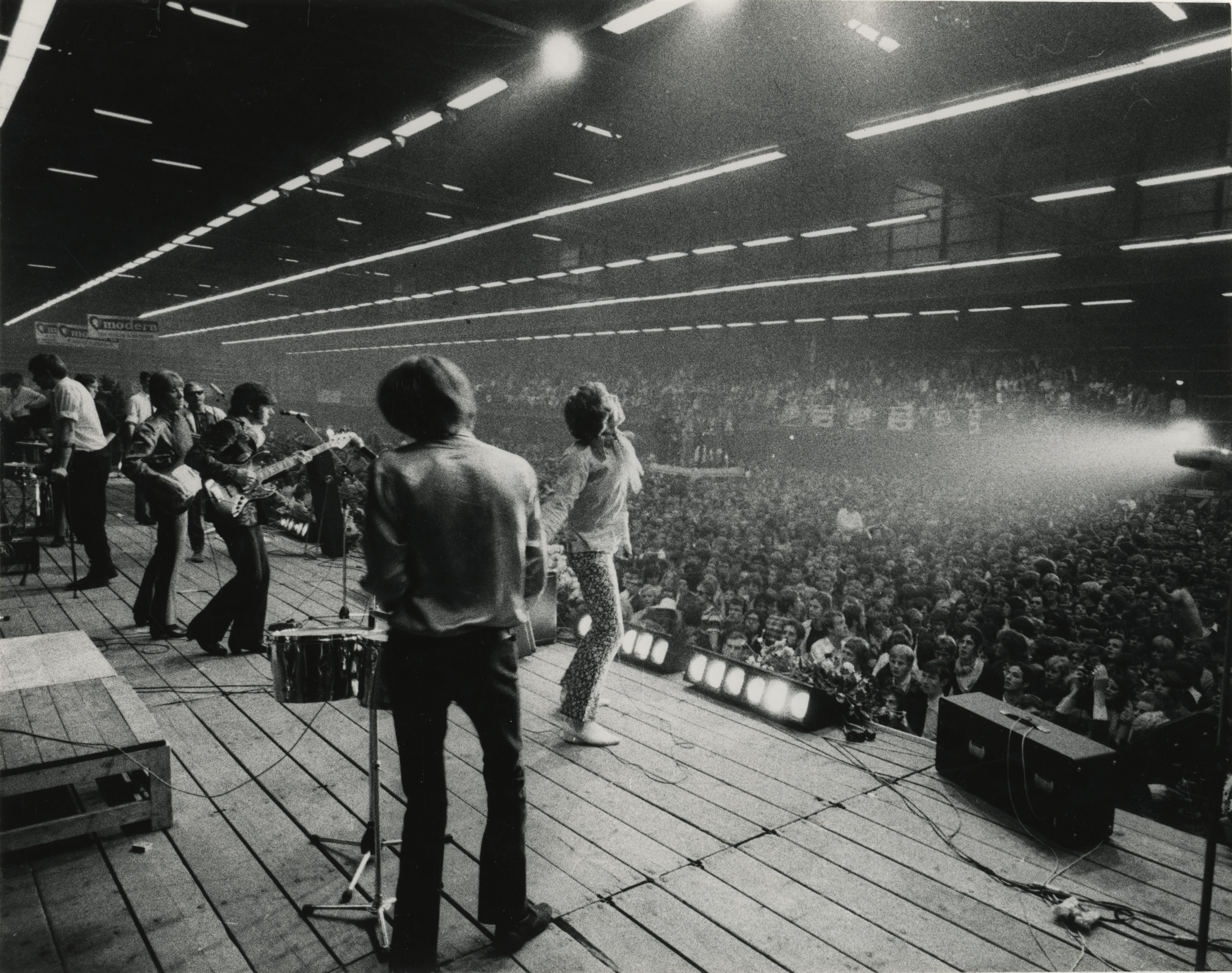
Performance in Rotterdam. 1967

The band were big sellers elsewhere, particularly in British Commonwealth countries. In New Zealand, the group had three number one hits, and seven other songs reached the top ten. In Australia, they reached the top ten with "Hold Tight!", "Bend It!", "Zabadak!" and "The Legend of Xanadu". In Canada, the band scored two top-ten hits with "Zabadak!", which reached number one, and "The Legend of Xanadu", and hit the top thirty with "Break Out" — a song that was only released in North America.

In the US, the group failed to break out nationally, although they had regional successes, particularly in northeastern cities such as Cleveland, Buffalo, Syracuse, Albany and Boston where both "Bend It" and "Hold Tight" gained considerable airplay and charted in the top ten on local radio stations. "Zabadak" gained extensive US airplay during the winter of 1967–68, climbing to the top ten in several major US markets including Los Angeles, but despite pockets of radio exposure, the band never gained mass airplay in America; "Zabadak" was the band's only single to chart in the national Billboard Hot 100, where it peaked at No. 52. This is at least partially a result of both the band's US labels, Fontana and Imperial Records, failing to secure them a US tour or TV appearances. Fontana set up just two appearances on national US TV programs. These were in July 1966 ("Hold Tight" on Where the Action Is) and Piccadilly Palace on 26 August 1967 (performing their then-current single "Okay"). Imperial scored none.

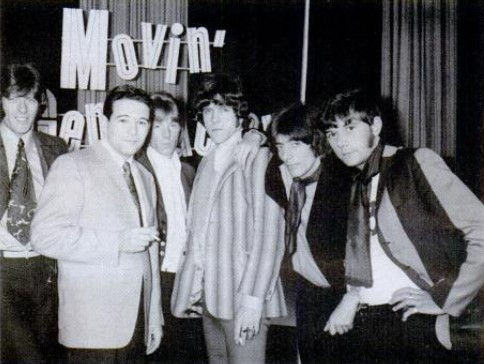
The band with WSBT-TV host Marty Montel in 1967, left to right: Mick, Montel, Tich, Dave Dee, Beaky, Dozy.

In September 1969, Dave Dee left the group for a short-lived solo career. NME reported the previous month that Dave Dee was to play a motorbike gang leader in the forthcoming Marty Feldman film Every Home Should Have One. The rest of the band, re-billed as D,B,M and T, continued releasing records until they broke up in 1973.

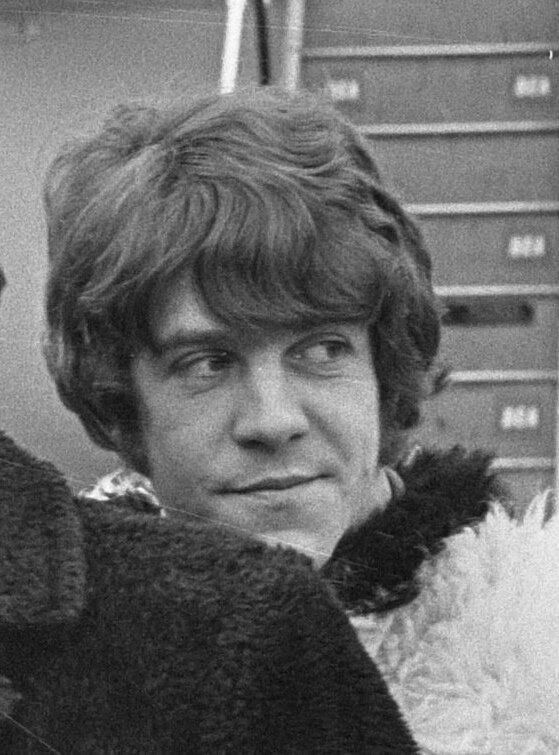
Dave Dee in 1967

In 1973, Ian Amey and John Dymond formed a band with Peter Mason, Bob Taylor, and Charles O'Brien called "Mason". In 1974, the original line-up reunited for a single, "She's My Lady", with Dave Dee and Peter Mason producing. Ian Amey and John Dymond continued performing with Trevor Ward-Davies and Pete Lucas in a band called, "Tracker". In 1976, after "Tracker" broke up. Ian Amey reunited Dozy, Beaky, Mick & Tich with the line-up of "Tracker". Now "Beaky" was drumming and Pete, under the name Mick, played guitar.

In 1979, Dave Dee produced, but didn't perform on, the band's single, "You've Got Me on the Run", which featured Beaky on lead vocals. In 1980 or 1982, Dave Dee rejoined the band, though not consistently. Sometimes appearing for half of a show, but not all of one. Pete Lucas left and was replaced by singer, John Hatchman. While initially a singer in the band, Hatchman eventually began playing drums and Beaky returned to guitar. The group continued to make records, usually with Dave Dee, though not always, such as in the case of the 1986 single, "Matthew and Son". In the meantime, Dave Dee had become a record producer with Magnet Records. In 1987, the band moved to Marbella, except for Dave Dee, practically removing him from the band.

In 1989, the band moved back to England, though without John Dymond, who wanted to stay behind. Paul Bennett replaced him. A few years later, Tony Carpenter replaced Bennett. In the 1990s, they started performing once more, this time with Dave Dee. Dave Dee was a justice of the peace in Cheshire until he retired from the bench in 2008 due to his failing health. He continued to perform with his band almost up until his death on 9 January 2009. He had been suffering from prostate cancer since early 2001.

In July 2005, Dozy, Beaky, Mick and Tich performed at the Merryhill Music Festival at the Merryhill Leisure naturist club in Norfolk, England.

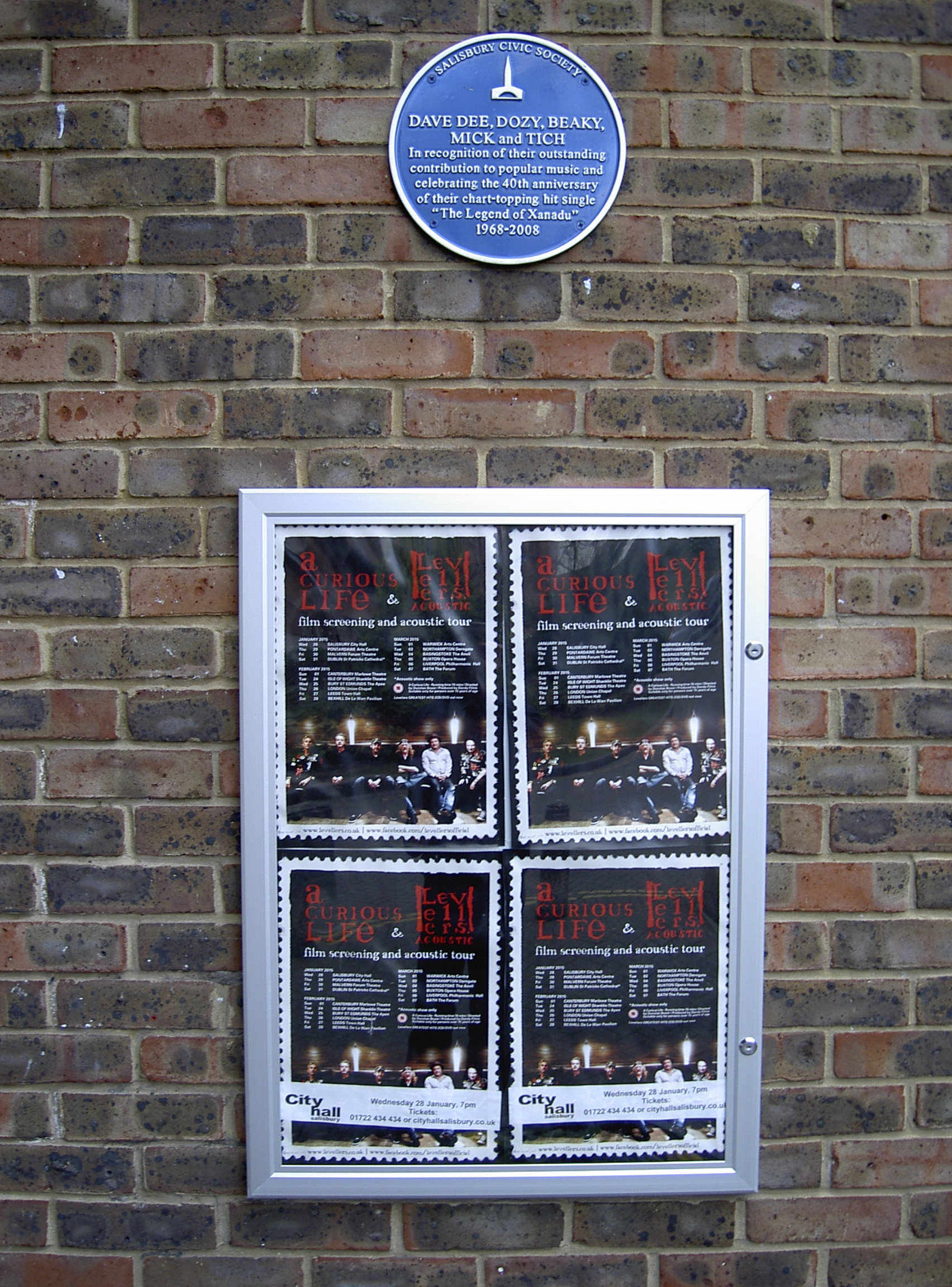
The DDDBMT Blue Plaque in Salisbury

In 2008, to celebrate 40 years since "The Legend of Xanadu" entering the music charts, a Blue plaque was placed in Salisbury.

In 2013, John Dymond (the original Beaky) returned to the band. In 2014, Tich retired after 50 years.

With Ray Frost as the new "Tich", the band, still including two original members, pledged to continue. However, Trevor Ward-Davies (Dozy) died on 13 January 2015, aged 70, after a short illness. He is survived by his wife, Yvonne.

The band were considered for the "legends" stage at Glastonbury Festival 2024.

Rhythm guitarist and vocalist Pete Lucas ("Mick" from 1976 to 1982) died on 16 December 2023, his 73rd birthday.

Ian Amey (the original Tich) died on 15 February 2024, at the age of 79.

John Dymond (the original Beaky) died on 5 July 2026, at the age of 81. At the time of his death, Dymond was the last original member in the band, and the group decided to carry on with Adrian Fountain taking Dymond's place, leaving no classic members in the current or future versions of the band. Dymond's death also leaves Michael Wilson (the original Mick) as the last surviving original member.

== Personnel ==
Dave Dee

- David John Harman; died 2009 – lead vocals (1964–1969, 1974, occasional appearances between 1982–1987, 1989–2009)

Dozy

- Trevor Ward-Davies; died 2015 – bass, vocals (1964–1973, 1974, 1976–2015)
- Paul Cornwell – bass (2015–present)

Beaky

- John Dymond; died 2026 – rhythm guitar, vocals (1964–1973, 1974, 1982–1990, 2013–2026), drums (1976–1982)
- Paul Bennett – rhythm guitar (1989–1993)
- Tony Carpenter – rhythm guitar (1993–2013)
- Adrian Fountain – rhythm guitar (2026–present)

Mick

- Michael Wilson – drums (1964–1973, 1974)
- Pete Lucas; died 2023 – rhythm guitar, vocals (1976–1982)
- John Hatchman – drums, vocals (1982–present)

Tich

- Ian Amey; died 2024 – lead guitar, vocals (1964–1973, 1974, 1976–2014)
- Jolyon Dixon – lead guitar (2014–2020)
- Chris Moores – lead guitar (2020–present)

== Usage in media ==
- "Hold Tight!" is used in Quentin Tarantino's 2007 film Death Proof.
- "Bend It!" is used in an episode of the American animated sitcom Futurama entitled "The Mutants Are Revolting".
- The 2021 film Last Night in Soho, directed by Edgar Wright, features the band's 1968 hit of the same name.

== Discography ==
- Dave Dee, Dozy, Beaky, Mick & Tich (1966)
- If Music Be the Food of Love... Prepare for Indigestion (1966)
- If No-One Sang (1968)
- Together (1969)
- Fresh Ear (1970) (as D,B,M+T)
- Dave Dee, Dozy, Beaky, Mick & Tich (1984) (re-recordings)
