= Steve Rowland (music producer) =

American record producer and actor

Stephen Jacob Rowland (born September 3, 1932, in Los Angeles, California) is an American singer, columnist, record producer and actor. He grew up in Beverly Hills and now lives in Palm Springs, California. His father was film director Roy Rowland, his mother Ruth was a writer, and Louis B. Mayer was his great-uncle.

== Career ==
In 1950s, Hollywood, he acted in thirty five TV shows such as The Rifleman, Bonanza, Wanted: Dead or Alive and a two-year role in The Life and Legend of Wyatt Earp. Film appearances included co-starring roles in Gun Glory with Stewart Granger; Crime in the Streets with John Cassavetes and Sal Mineo, the original The Thin Red Line with Keir Dullea and Jack Warden, Gunfighters of Casa Grande with Alex Nicol as well as Battle of the Bulge with Henry Fonda; the latter three films shot in Spain.

During the making of five films in Spain, Rowland enjoyed Spanish chart success with the group, Los Flaps. The lure of the exciting British music scene of the Swinging Sixties brought him to London, where he produced thirteen Top Ten hits for Dave Dee, Dozy, Beaky, Mick & Tich. Among those worldwide hits were "Hold Tight", "Zabadak", "Bend It" and "The Legend of Xanadu" (a million selling UK Number One).

He also discovered Peter Frampton and The Herd, and with "A Way Of Life" had a No. 6 UK Singles Chart hit with his own group, The Family Dogg. He produced hits for P.J. Proby and The Pretty Things, being responsible for two singles and the Emotions album. In 1970, he produced the album Coming From Reality for Rodriguez. Also in 1970, under the name 'Steve & Albert', Rowland joined forces with Albert Hammond for the single "Follow The Bouncing Ball", which they heavily promoted, particularly in the UK, where they appeared on Top of the Pops and The Basil Brush Show, but the single failed to chart. In the 1970s, he was awarded a gold album and ASCAP award for producing Jerry Lee Lewis - The Session...Recorded in London with Great Artists. He was also the producer on the Thunderthighs U.K. hit single "Central Park Arrest", written by Lynsey De Paul and he co-wrote their follow up single "Dracula's Daughter". In the late 1970s, he was creative manager/A&R for Hansa/Ariola, where he discovered and signed The Cure and signed The Thompson Twins, and handled Boney M and Japan.

In 1988, he ran his own dance label Dr. Beat, and later became creative director of Wham Records. Rowland has also written, produced and collated music for the TWI TV series Hi Five broadcast in thirty eight countries. At the end of 1993 Rowland became a director of Pavilion Studios forming a production company working with a number of young DJs, producers, artistes and programmers. During this time he auditioned and tried to sign the then unknown Spice Girl, Geri Halliwell. In 1995 he became managing director of Media Bank UK, a Hong Kong–based international production company.
