= Philips Studios =

Philips Studios was a recording studio located at Stanhope Place in Central London near Marble Arch. The studio, which opened in 1956, was initially a primary recording location for Philips Records. The studios' name changed along with its record label affiliation, becoming Phonogram Studios in 1972, then PolyGram Studios in 1980. In 1983 Paul Weller bought the studios and renamed them Solid Bond Studios. Weller closed the studio in 1991.

The studio was the location of numerous notable recordings by artists including Dusty Springfield, Manfred Mann, The Move, Electric Light Orchestra, Wizzard, Status Quo and others.

== History ==
=== Philips Studio (1956–1972) ===
In May, 1956 Philips Records acquired the Regency building at 2-4 Stanhope Place in Central London, which they gutted and redesigned to become headquarters to its UK record division. A single-room recording studio (60' x 20', with a 25' high ceiling) was built in the large basement area, opening in August that year. The rooms above the studio accommodated a pressing plant and offices for Philips.

The studio was initially equipped with an 8-input mono valve mixing console that was rebuilt for stereo in 1958. It was one of London's first 4-track studios. Philips employed head of A&R Johnny Franz, arranger Ivor Raymonde, and engineer Peter Olliff, with the studio producing hits by Marty Wilde, Frankie Vaughan, The Springfields (with lead vocalist Dusty), and The Walker Brothers in the late '50s and early '60s.

In 1964, The Who (as The High Numbers) recorded "I'm the Face" at the studio. That year, the studio commissioned Neve Electronics to design and build a series of transistor-based equalizers. Pleased with the results, Philips commissioned a 16-channel mobile mixing console the following year - Neve's first transistor mixing console. In October 1965, a 20-channel console was commissioned for the London studio in conjunction with a remodel overseen by acoustician Sandy Brown, which Neve delivered in 1966.

The same year, Dusty Springfield recorded "You Don't Have to Say You Love Me" at Philips, singing her vocals in the studio's stairwell. Other artists recording at the studio in the 1960s included Jimmy Page, Manfred Mann, The Spencer Davis Group, Ambrose Slade, and the Tubby Hayes Quartet.

In 1970, The Move recorded their album Looking On at Philips, and when Move members Roy Wood and Jeff Lynne formed Electric Light Orchestra, they recorded at the same studio for ELO's debut album.

=== Phonogram Studios (1972–1980) ===
In 1972 the Philips, Fontana, Mercury, and Vertigo labels became Phonogram Records, and Philips studio was renamed Phonogram Studio and upgraded to 16-track recording capabilities. That year, Wood's newest project, Wizzard, recorded their debut album, Wizzard Brew at the studio. In 1974, Status Quo recorded at the studio and returned to Phonogram to record one of their most successful albums, Blue for You (1976). Steve Lillywhite began his studio career at Phonogram in 1972 as a tape op. Working weekends at the studio he produced a demo recording for Ultravox!, which led to them being offered a recording contract with Island Records, and returning to Phonogram during the recording of Ha!-Ha!-Ha!.

=== PolyGram Studios (1980–1983) ===
In 1980 Phonogram and Polydor Records merged to become PolyGram Records, and the studio was renamed PolyGram Studios. In 1982, The Jam recorded their sixth and final studio album at the studio.

=== Solid Bond Studios (1983–1991) ===
In 1983 PolyGram put the studio up for sale, and it was purchased by former Jam member Paul Weller, who renamed it Solid Bond Studios. Weller formed The Style Council, and the band utilised Solid Bond Studios for many of their recordings. Other artists recording at the studio in the 1980s included Oasis, Young Disciples, and Difford & Tilbrook.

On 21 August 1991, the studio was closed. The building was later converted to offices.

== See also ==
- Philips Records
