= Ken Howard (composer) =

English composer (1939–2024)

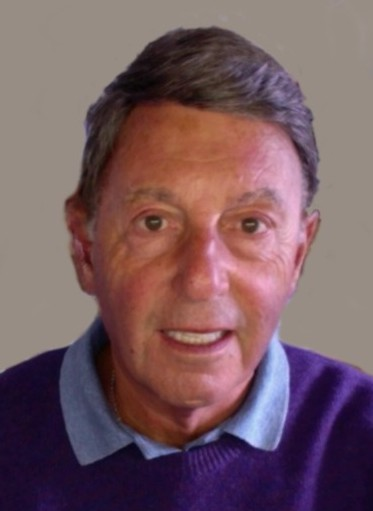
- Howard in 2018
- Born: Kenneth Charles Howard; 26 December 1939; Worthing, West Sussex, England
- Died: 24 September 2024 (aged 84)
- Education: University of Edinburgh (MA)
- Occupations: Songwriter, lyricist, author, television director
- Partner: Benjamin Shorten
- Musical career
- Genres: Pop music, classical music, film score
- Website: www.kenhoward-alanblaikley.com

Kenneth Charles Howard (26 December 1939 – 24 September 2024) was an English songwriter, lyricist, author and television director.

== Early years ==
Howard was born in Worthing, West Sussex, on 26 December 1939. His father, Harry Howard, was a lawyer who founded the London law firm Howard, Kennedy & Rossi. His mother, Betty, was a concert pianist. He was evacuated with his brother Alan to Cleveland, Ohio, during World War Two and returned to London after the war. From 1947 to 1956 he attended University College School (UCS) in London, where he became friends with Alan Blaikley, and from 1956 to 1957 he attended Aiglon College in Villars, Switzerland. After a year working with Granada Television in London, he went to Edinburgh University where he read Social Anthropology.

He was cast as a singer, together with fellow London student Eva Hermann, in Varsity Vanities of 1959 and they became known as a vocal duo called "Eva and Ken" They won a weekly slot in Scottish Television's musical show Jigtime, singing songs from around the world, and recorded for Fontana Records. Howard graduated with an MA degree and began working with BBC Television's drama department in White City, London.

Howard joined forces with two old UCS friends, Alan Blaikley and Paul Overy, and between 1962 and 1963 they ran and edited four issues of a magazine, Axle Quarterly, publishing early work by Melvyn Bragg, Ray Gosling, Alexis Lykiard, Gillian Freeman and Simon Raven amongst others. An offshoot of the Quarterly was a series of five booklets on controversial topics commissioned by Blaikley, Howard and Overy, named Axle Spokes (Axle Publications 1963). These included Peter Graham's The Abortive Renaissance, a critical examination of British New Wave cinema; John Gale's Sex – Is it Easy?, on the emergence of the permissive society; Gavin Millar's Pop! – Hit or Miss?, the British hit-parade in the early days of the Beatles; Anthony Rowley's Another Kind of Loving, homosexuality in the years when it was still a criminal offence in the UK; and Melville Hardiment's Hooked, an enquiry into the extent and nature of drug addiction in the early 1960s.

== Songwriting ==
=== International hits in the 1960s and 1970s ===
In the 1960s and 1970s, in collaboration with Alan Blaikley, Ken Howard composed the music and words for many international top 10 hits, including two UK number ones, "Have I the Right?" (The Honeycombs) and "The Legend of Xanadu" (Dave Dee, Dozy, Beaky, Mick & Tich).

Among other performers for whom they wrote were The Herd, Petula Clark, Phil Collins, Sacha Distel, Rolf Harris, Frankie Howerd (the theme song for his film Up Pompeii), Engelbert Humperdinck, Horst Jankowski, Eartha Kitt, Little Eva, Lulu and Matthews Southern Comfort.

Ken Howard and Alan Blaikley were the first British composers to write for Elvis Presley, including the hit "I've Lost You" (1970), which he later performed in the film That's The Way It Is. Their collaboration with the maverick psychiatrist R. D. Laing led to the release of the cult album Life Before Death.

Howard and Blaikley's concept album, Ark 2 (1969), performed by Flaming Youth, drew the comment that Blaikley and Howard "have a wit, gaiety, dignity and melodic flair reminiscent of Leonard Bernstein...which suggest that pop is becoming the serious music – in the proper sense – of the age"

=== Television themes ===
Howard and Blaikley were responsible for theme and incidental music for several television drama series including The Flame Trees of Thika (1981) and By the Sword Divided (1983–1985), both subsequently aired in the US on Alistair Cooke’s Masterpiece Theatre, and the BBC's long-running series of Agatha Christie’s Miss Marple (1984–1992). Howard also scored BBC TV's BAFTA and Emmy Award-winning Shadowlands with Claire Bloom and Joss Ackland in 1985, Mervyn Peake's Mr Pye with Derek Jacobi and Judy Parfitt, and Ronald Neame's last film, Foreign Body in 1986, plus BBC TV's The Black and Blue Lamp (1988) and The Angry Earth in 1989.

=== Musicals ===
Howard and Blaikley wrote two West End musicals, Mardi Gras (Prince of Wales Theatre, 1976) and The Secret Diary of Adrian Mole (Wyndham's Theatre, 1984–1986), and two BBC TV musicals Orion (1977) (based on the earlier work of Ark 2) and Ain't Many Angels (1978). They also wrote music and lyrics for the 1990 UK tour of Roald Dahl's Matilda.

=== Film career ===
As a British film maker Howard has worked extensively in drama, music and documentary films. These have included (for the BBC) A Penny for Your Dreams, John Lennon – A Journey in the Life, The Miracle of Intervale Avenue, Open Mind, Mr Abbott's Broadway and Sunny Stories; (for ITV) South Bank Show profiles of the New World Symphony Orchestra, Danny Kaye, Frank Sinatra, Hakan Hardenberger, Johnnie Ray and Maxim Vengerov, EK-OK, and Will Apples Grow on Mars?. The BBC drama A Penny for Your Dreams which he co-wrote, composed and directed won the Festival Award at the Celtic Media Festival in Caernarfon in 1988. His BBC films, Braveheart and Today I am A Man, both won the Royal Television Society Best Children's Factual Award. His EMI DVD Maxim Vengerov: Living the Dream won the BBC Music Magazine Award for Best Music DVD in 2008.

He was a director of Landseer Productions Ltd in London until 2019.

== Other activities ==
His first novel, The Young Chieftain, aimed at a teenage audience, was published by Tamarind Books, a division of Random House, in September 2010. His second novel, Follow Me – A Quest in Two Worlds, was published by Venture Press in November 2017.

Howard was Chairman of The Casey Trust, aiding children worldwide. He also ran a board games company.

== Personal life and death ==
Howard was in a civil partnership with his partner, Benjamin Shorten. Howard died on 24 September 2024, at the age of 84.
