= Alan Blaikley =

English songwriter and composer (1940–2022)

- Born: Alan Tudor Blaikley; 23 March 1940; Hampstead Garden Suburb, Middlesex, England
- Died: 4 July 2022 (aged 82) Hampstead, London, England
- Genres: Pop music, musicals, theme music
- Occupations: Songwriter, lyricist, composer
- Years active: 1960s–2022
- Website: www.kenhoward-alanblaikley.com

Alan Tudor Blaikley (23 March 1940 – 4 July 2022) was an English songwriter and composer, best known for writing a series of international hits in the 1960s and 1970s in collaboration with Ken Howard, including the UK number one hits "Have I the Right?" and "The Legend of Xanadu". Together with Howard, he also wrote two West End musicals and a number of TV themes, including the theme music for the BBC's long-running series of Agatha Christie's Miss Marple.

== Early life and career ==
Alan Tudor Blaikley was born in Hampstead Garden Suburb, Middlesex, on 23 March 1940. He was educated at University College School (UCS), Hampstead, and Wadham College, Oxford, where he read Classical Moderations (Latin and Greek) and English, and was Reviews Editor of the university newspaper, Cherwell.

After coming down from university, he joined forces with two old UCS friends Ken Howard and Paul Overy with whom, between 1962 and 1963, he ran and edited four issues of a magazine, Axle Quarterly, publishing early work by Melvyn Bragg, Ray Gosling, Alexis Lykiard, Gillian Freeman and Simon Raven, among others. An offshoot of the Quarterly was a series of five booklets on controversial topics commissioned by Blaikley, Howard and Overy, Axle Spokes (Axle Publications 1963): Peter Graham The Abortive Renaissance, a critical examination of British New Wave cinema; John Gale Sex – is it easy?, the emergence of the permissive society; Gavin Millar Pop! – hit or miss?, the British hit-parade in the early days of the Beatles; Anthony Rowley (pseudonym of Alan Blaikley) Another Kind of Loving, homosexuality in the years when it was still a criminal offence in the UK; Melville Hardiment – Hooked, an enquiry into the extent and nature of drug addiction in the early 1960s.

At the same time, as a freelance, Blaikley wrote and narrated several BBC Radio programmes, including Writing for Children, in which he interviewed C. S. Lewis, J. R. R. Tolkien and Enid Blyton. From 1963 to 1964 Blaikley was a trainee producer with BBC TV Talks Department and worked on the daily current affairs programme Tonight.

It had been earlier, during his years as a choir-boy at St-Mary-at-Finchley, that he began to realise that, while his voice was less than brilliant, he did possess a gift for inventing ear-catching melodies. This period as a chorister he regarded as his essential musical education.

== Songwriting and composing ==
=== International hits in the 1960s and 1970s ===
In the 1960s and 1970s, in collaboration with Ken Howard, Blaikley composed the music and words for many international top 10 hits, including two UK number ones, "Have I the Right?" (The Honeycombs) and "The Legend of Xanadu" (Dave Dee, Dozy, Beaky, Mick & Tich).

Among other performers for whom they wrote were Petula Clark, Phil Collins, Sacha Distel, Rolf Harris, Frankie Howerd (the theme song for his film Up Pompeii), Engelbert Humperdinck, Horst Jankowski, Eartha Kitt, Little Eva, Marmalade, The Herd, Lulu and Matthews Southern Comfort.

Blaikley and Howard were the first British composers to write for Elvis Presley, including the hit "I've Lost You" (1970), which he later performed in the film That's The Way It Is.

=== Ark 2 ===
Blaikley and Howard's concept album, Ark 2 (1969), performed by Flaming Youth, drew the comment that Blaikley and Howard "have a wit, gaiety, dignity and melodic flair reminiscent of Leonard Bernstein...which suggest that pop is becoming the serious music – in the proper sense – of the age"

=== Musicals ===
Blaikley and Howard wrote two West End musicals, Mardi Gras (Prince of Wales Theatre, 1976) and The Secret Diary of Adrian Mole (Wyndham's Theatre, 1984 – 1986), and two BBC TV musicals Orion (1977)(based on the earlier material of Ark 2) and Ain't Many Angels (1978). They also wrote music and lyrics to the 1990 UK tour of Roald Dahl's Matilda.

=== Television themes ===
Blaikley and Howard were also responsible for theme and incidental music for several television drama series, including The Flame Trees of Thika (1981) and By the Sword Divided (1983–1985), both of which subsequently aired in the U.S. on Alistair Cooke's Masterpiece Theatre, and the BBC's long-running series of Agatha Christie's Miss Marple (1984–1992).

== Psychotherapy ==
Blaikley had long been interested in analytical psychology and, at the instigation of his analyst, mentor and friend, Dr William Kraemer, he trained as a psychotherapist at the Westminster Pastoral Foundation (The Foundation for Psychotherapy and Counselling).

On graduating, he ran a private practice from his home between 1981 and 2003. This led to a collaboration between Blaikley and Howard and the maverick psychiatrist R. D. Laing on the cult album Life before Death.

== Later work ==
Blaikley worked on a memoir, Have I the Right? – Memories, Reflections, Notes, and maintained his collaboration with Howard, with whom he was co-director of an active publishing company, Axle Music Ltd.

== Personal life and death ==
Blaikley's partner from 1978 to 2015 was the translator David Charles Harris (1954–2015), with whom he entered into a civil partnership in 2007.

Blaikley died from stercoral colitis at the Royal Free Hospital in Hampstead, London, on 4 July 2022, aged 82.

== See also ==
- List of Old Gowers
