= Chartbusters Go Pop =

Compilation album by Elton John
- Released: 1994
- Recorded: 1969–1970
- Genre: Pop
- Length: 56:48
- Label: RPM; Purple Pyramid
- Producer: Various

Elton John chronology
The Lion King (1994)	Chartbusters Go Pop (1994)	Made in England (1995)

Alternative cover
- Reissue cover.

Professional ratings
Review scores
Source	Rating
Allmusic	3/5 stars
The Encyclopedia of Popular Music	2/5 stars

Chartbusters Go Pop (subtitled 20 Legendary Covers from 1969/70 as sung by Elton John) is a compilation album of cover versions by Elton John.

These recordings are from the days prior to John's success as a solo performer. They are taken from a variety of periodically issued budget-priced compilations of hit songs, under brand names including Top of the Pops, Chartbusters and Hot Hits. These were issued by budget labels including Music for Pleasure and featured current or recent hits re-recorded, with varying degrees of note-for-note accuracy, by nameless "soundalike" performers. Like many other jobbing session singers of the time, John worked as a vocalist on these albums.

These covers compilations were cheaply recorded, cheaply priced, and sold in large quantities until, in 1972, compilations featuring the original artists were introduced by such labels as K-Tel. The public preferred the original recordings and the market for cheap cover compilations rapidly declined. This album collects together John's contributions to a variety of covers albums issued during 1969 and 1970. This collection was released by minor labels in the UK and US in 1994 and was re-issued many times afterwards.

== Track listing ==
No.	Title	Writer(s)	Original artist	Length
1.	"My Baby Loves Lovin'"	Roger Cook; Roger Greenaway	White Plains	2:44
2.	"Cotton Fields"	Lead Belly	Lead Belly (based on the version by The Beach Boys)	2:47
3.	"Lady D'Arbanville"	Cat Stevens	Cat Stevens	3:41
4.	"Natural Sinner"	Andy Fairweather Low	Fair Weather	2:50
5.	"United We Stand"	Tony Hiller; John Goodison	Brotherhood of Man	2:48
6.	"Spirit in the Sky"	Norman Greenbaum	Norman Greenbaum	3:37
7.	"Travelin' Band"	John Fogerty	Creedence Clearwater Revival	2:16
8.	"I Can't Tell the Bottom from the Top"	Guy Fletcher; Doug Flett	The Hollies	3:42
9.	"Good Morning Freedom"	Albert Hammond; Michael Hazlewood; Cook; Greenaway	Blue Mink	3:07
10.	"To Be Young, Gifted and Black"	Nina Simone; Weldon Irvine	Nina Simone	3:04
11.	"In the Summertime"	Ray Dorset	Mungo Jerry	2:51
12.	"Up Around the Bend"	Fogerty	Creedence Clearwater Revival	2:38
13.	"Snake in the Grass"	Ken Howard; Alan Blaikley	Dave Dee, Dozy, Beaky, Mick & Tich	3:02
14.	"Neanderthal Man"	Kevin Godley; Lol Creme; Eric Stewart	Hotlegs	3:35
15.	"She Sold Me Magic"	Lou Christie; Twyla Herbert	Lou Christie	1:56
16.	"Come and Get It"	Paul McCartney	Badfinger	2:14
17.	"Love of the Common People"	John Hurley and Ronnie Wilkins	The Four Preps (based on the version by The Winstons)	2:33
18.	"Signed, Sealed, Delivered I'm Yours"	Stevie Wonder; Lee Garrett; Syreeta Wright; Lula Mae Hardaway	Stevie Wonder	2:32
19.	"It's All in the Game"	Carl Sigman, Charles G. Dawes	Tommy Edwards (based on the version by the Four Tops)	2:23
20.	"Yellow River"	Jeff Christie	Christie	2:35
