= Nashville tuning =

Guitar tuning

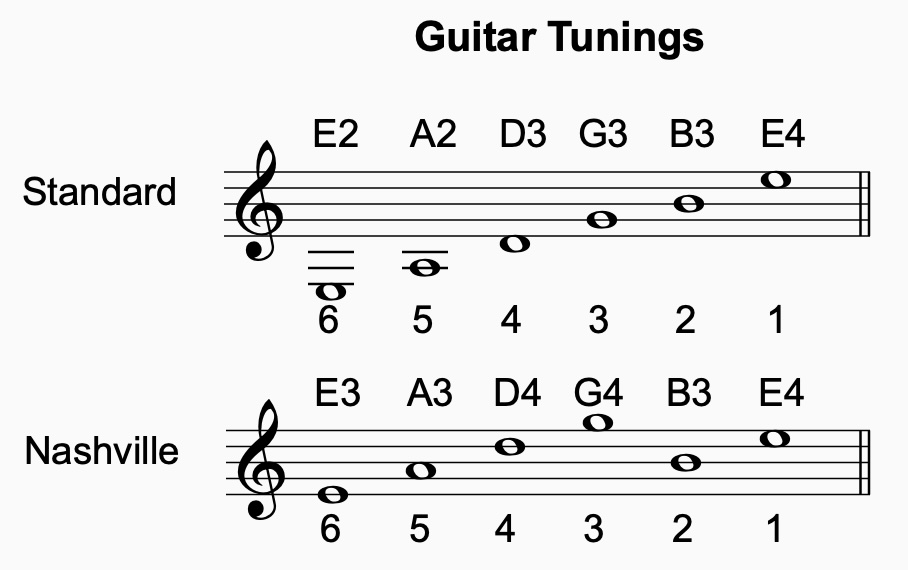
Standard and Nashville guitar tunings, notated an octave higher than they sound.

Nashville tuning (also high-strung or high-string guitar) is the practice of replacing the heavy lower strings of a guitar with lighter ones that sound an octave higher.

The six strings of a guitar are normally tuned to the notes E2-A2-D3-G3-B3-E4. The lowest four strings, numbers 6–3, are wound. On a high-strung guitar, these strings are replaced with lighter gauge strings, often from the higher string from each course of a twelve-string guitar set.

Because the note names are the same, the chord shapes do not change, making high-strung guitars relatively easy to play for most guitarists. The resulting sound is bright and distinctive. It is common practice for sessions in Nashville to have a rhythm guitarist playing in Nashville tuning.

The practice emerged in the 1950s. Ray Edenton is often mistakenly credited with inventing it after he broke a string. Edenton recalls that he merely adopted the practice from Chet Atkins. The high-strung sound became a signature in Edenton's prolific session work.

== Examples ==
Pink Floyd used Nashville tuning on "Hey You", as did Kansas on "Dust in the Wind". David Gilmour slightly modified the practice by using identical high Es for both the 6th and the 1st string of his Ovation Custom Legend. Mick Taylor plays in Nashville tuning on the Rolling Stones' "Wild Horses". "Jumpin' Jack Flash" featured two acoustic guitars overdriven through a cassette recorder. The main riff is played on a guitar in open tuning. The second part is played on a high-strung guitar. James Williamson used Nashville tuning on "Gimme Danger" on Raw Power by the Stooges. Elliott Smith used a variant of Nashville tuning with a twelve-string guitar on XO for the song "Tomorrow Tomorrow." Andy Fairweather Low used a high-strung guitar on his 1975 UK hit single "Wide Eyed and Legless", taken from his La Booga Rooga album. The Smiths used Nashville tuning on "William, It Was Really Nothing" and "The Headmaster Ritual".

Pat Metheny is known for using Nashville tuning on several occasions, notably his song "Phase Dance" from his group's debut album. Metheny also applied a "half-Nashville tuning" to a baritone guitar, where the 3rd and 4th string only are raised an octave. Frank Gambale uses a version of Nashville tuning a fifth lower.
