= Unfinished Business =

Unfinished Business may refer to:

== Film and television ==
=== Film ===
- Unfinished Business (1941 film), an American film by Gregory La Cava
- Unfinished Business (1977 film), a Spanish film by José Luis Garci
- Unfinished Business (1984 film), a Canadian film by Don Owen
- Unfinished Business (1985 American film), a documentary film by Steven Okazaki
- Unfinished Business (1985 Australian film), directed by Bob Ellis
- Unfinished Business, a 1987 film starring Gina Hecht
- Unfinished Business (2009 film), a South African mockumentary
- Unfinished Business (2015 film), an American film by Ken Scott

=== Television ===
==== Series ====
- Unfinished Business (TV series), a 1998–1999 British sitcom
- The Amazing Race 18, or The Amazing Race: Unfinished Business, a 2011 American reality program

==== Episodes ====
- "Unfinished Business" (Arrow), 2013
- "Unfinished Business" (Bakugan: Mechtanium Surge), 2011
- "Unfinished Business" (Battlestar Galactica), 2006
- "Unfinished Business" (Doctors), 2002
- "Unfinished Business" (Everwood), 2004
- "Unfinished Business" (Highway Thru Hell), 2017
- "Unfinished Business" (Murder, She Wrote), 1986
- "Unfinished Business" (Outlander), 2024
- "Unfinished Business" (Scarecrow and Mrs. King), 1986
- "Unfinished Business" (Star Wars: The Clone Wars), 2020
- "Unfinished Business" (Supernatural), 2018
- "Unfinished Business" (White Collar), 2010
- "Unfinished Business" (Reacher), 2025

== Literature ==
- Unfinished Business: Paul Keating's Interrupted Revolution, a 2009 book by David Love
- Unfinished Business: Women Men Work Family, a 2015 book by Anne-Marie Slaughter
- Unfinished Business, a 1945 book by Stephen Bonsal
- Unfinished Business, a 1993 book by Roger Douglas
- Unfinished Business, a novel by Sheila Gordon
- Unfinished Business: One Man's Extraordinary Year of Trying to Do the Right Things, a book by Lee Kravitz

== Music ==
=== Albums ===
- Unfinished Business (Andy Bown album), 2011
- Unfinished Business (Big Moe album), 2008
- Unfinished Business (Death Before Dishonor album), 2019
- Unfinished Business (EPMD album), 1989
- Unfinished Business (Eric Carr album), 2011
- Unfinished Business (Jay-Z and R. Kelly album), 2004
- Unfinished Business (Johnny Crash album), 2008
- Unfinished Business (Loverboy album), 2014
- Unfinished Business (Nathan Sykes album), 2016
- Unfinished Business (Penal Colony album) or the title song, 2003
- Unfinished Business (Ronnie Spector album) or the title song, 1987
- Unfinished Business (Wanda Jackson album), 2012
- Unfinished Business, by After 7, 2021
- Unfinished Business, by the Blackbyrds, 1976
- Unfinished Business, by Danny Gatton, 1987
- Unfinished Business, by Dave Davies, 1999
- Unfinished Business, by Steve Goodman, 1987
- Unfinished Business, an EP by Joan Jett, 2011

=== Songs ===
- "Unfinished Business" (song), by White Lies, 2008
- "Unfinished Business", by Boy George from Cheapness and Beauty, 1995

== Sports ==
- Deontay Wilder vs. Tyson Fury II, billed as Unfinished Business, a 2020 boxing match
- UFC 49: Unfinished Business, a 2004 mixed martial arts event
- WEC 18: Unfinished Business, a 2006 mixed martial arts event

== Video games ==
- Jagged Alliance 2: Unfinished Business, a 2000 expansion for the 1999 video game Jagged Alliance 2
- Tomb Raider: Unfinished Business, a 1997 expansion pack for the 1996 video game Tomb Raider
