= I Won't Say (I'm in Love) =

1997 song used in Disney's Hercules

Song by Susan Egan, Cheryl Freeman, Lillias White, Vaneese Thomas, LaChanze and Roz Ryan

from the album Hercules: An Original Walt Disney Records Soundtrack
- Released: May 27, 1997
- Recorded: 1996–1997
- Genre: Doo-wop; R&B; pop
- Length: 2:20
- Label: Walt Disney
- Composer: Alan Menken
- Lyricist: David Zippel
- Producer: Menken

"I Won't Say (I'm in Love)" is a song written by composer Alan Menken and lyricist David Zippel for Disney's animated film Hercules (1997). Released on May 27, 1997 as part of the film's soundtrack, the song was recorded by American actress and singer Susan Egan in her role as Meg, Hercules' love interest, while singers Cheryl Freeman, Lillias White, Vaneese Thomas, LaChanze, and Roz Ryan provided background vocals as the Muses. The songwriters wrote "I Won't Say (I'm in Love)" to replace "I Can't Believe My Heart", a slower ballad that had been deemed too soft for Meg's personality. Menken based "I Won't Say (I'm in Love)" on songs he had written for the stage musical Little Shop of Horrors (1982).

A stylistic departure from Disney ballads of the time period, "I Won't Say (I'm in Love)" is a mid-tempo doo-wop, R&B, and pop song reminiscent of 1960s music that incorporates elements of Motown and gospel, similar to the works of girl groups such as the Ronettes and the Supremes. Its lyrics are about denying having feelings for someone in an effort to avoid romantic clichés. In the Hercules musical sequence, Meg refuses to admit she is falling in love with the title character, while the Muses insist that she embrace her feelings for him instead.

"I Won't Say (I'm in Love)" has been positively reviewed by both film and music critics, many of whom deemed it the film's best song and praised its composition. Despite being ranked among some of Disney's best songs by some media publications, "I Won't Say (I'm in Love)" has also developed a reputation as one of the studio's most underappreciated. Among notable covers, American singer Belinda Carlisle recorded a pop rock version for the film's soundtrack, and American girl group the Cheetah Girls covered the song in 2005.

== Writing and recording ==
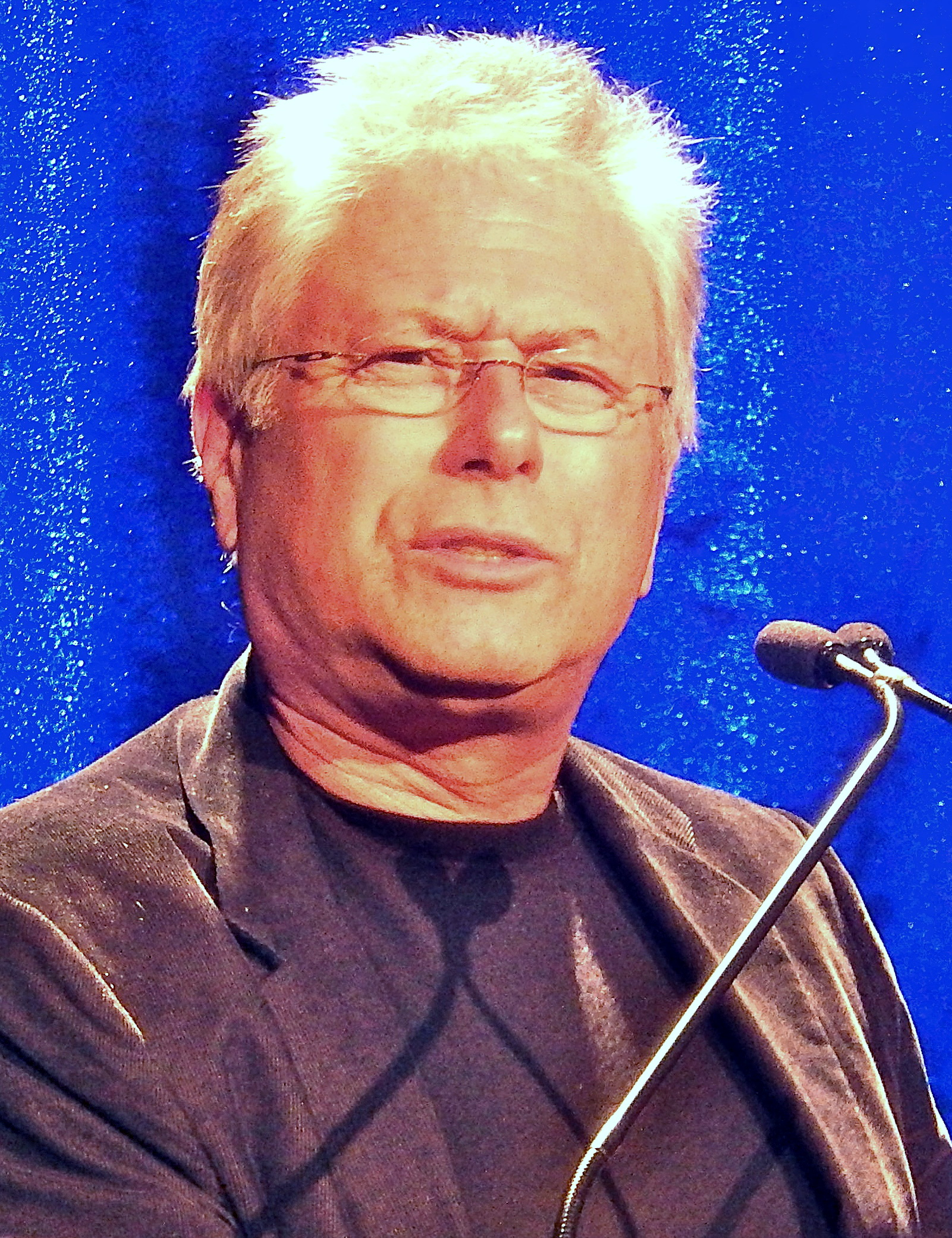
"I Won't Say (I'm in Love)" was written to replace a song composer Alan Menken had originally written for Meg because it did not suit the character's independent personality.

"I Won't Say (I'm in Love)" was written for Disney's animated film Hercules (1997) by composer Alan Menken and lyricist David Zippel. Menken originally wrote a "soaring" ballad entitled "I Can't Believe My Heart" for Meg, Hercules' love interest, which he had intended to show her realizing she is falling in love with the title character. Meg’s voice actress, Susan Egan, recorded the song, and animators began work on the sequence, only to discover that it was not working as they had intended. Creatives such as Meg's supervising animator, Ken Duncan, suggested that the character was "too tough" and "hardened by life" to perform such a delicate, emotional ballad. Menken agreed, and returned home to write a new song about denial, "I Won't Say (I'm in Love)", to replace "I Can't Believe My Heart". He based it on some of the girl group songs he had written for the stage musical Little Shop of Horrors (1982). Although Egan liked the original song, she agreed that "I Can't Believe My Heart" was "too straightforward and literal" for her character, whereas "I Won't Say (I'm in Love)" expresses a similar sentiment, albeit "the way Meg would—without admitting any of it". Zippel described the final version as "a love song with a sense of humor" that embodies "the classic love song of ‘I’m not in love’ and we know she really is".

Although Egan had fun recording "I Won't Say (I'm in Love)", she joked that she felt much "whiter" than usual recording with the five Black singers cast as the Muses (Cheryl Freeman, Lillias White, Vaneese Y. Thomas, LaChanze, and Roz Ryan), who provided the song's backup vocals. Already familiar with their work on Broadway, Egan felt intimidated by their powerful voices and riffing abilities. She recalled that while they were very comfortable improvising and ad-libbing per Menken's instruction, Egan would need to ask Menken to demonstrate her riffs on the piano note-by-note in order to replicate them, much to his disbelief. While it took Egan half an hour to solidify as few as one of her riffs, the other singers recorded multiple takes of their own within the same amount of time. Egan was greatly humbled by the experience, having never riffed in her previous singing roles. However, she said White in particular remained encouraging, reassuring her that "everybody has soul somewhere; we just need to find yours".

Menken also produced the track. Danny Troob arranged the song while Michael Kosarin conducted the orchestration. The song was released on May 27, 1997 as part of the film's soundtrack.

== Use in Hercules ==
In Hercules, Meg is a double agent who works for Hades despite beginning to fall in love with his adversary, Hercules, against her better judgement. Audiences learn that Meg has been in love before, only for her boyfriend at the time to leave her to pursue another woman after she had sold her soul to Hades to save his life. Because falling in love quickly had been a negative experience for Meg, she is hesitant and in denial about her own feelings. Like most Disney heroines, she sings about falling in love with her film's hero, a revelation she is too proud to admit. Therefore, she tries to convince herself that she is not in love, although her attempts remain unconvincing.

"I Won't Say (I'm in Love)" expresses Meg's conflicting feelings about Hercules, who she insists she does not love, only for her claims to constantly be refuted by the Muses. Considered to be Meg's signature song, it explores the "misunderstood nature" of the character. Upon realizing she has in fact begun to develop feelings for Hercules, much to her chagrin, the song allows Meg to work through her denial, by "alternating between fantasizing about how delightful it would be to be loved by Herc, and stomping her foot in anger at the very thought". Resembling an "admonishing" exchange between Meg and the Muses, "I Won't Say (I'm in Love)" is Meg's attempt to avoid the clichéd storylines of her predecessors as she berates herself for poor decision-making. The song takes place after Meg's date with Hercules in which she initially attempted to discover his weakness at the insistence of Hades, and is described by Alexandra Locke of Comic Book Resources as "an ode to her desire to protect herself against vulnerable feelings". After strolling through a Greek courtyard while performing the song with the Muses, the character's resistance finally proves futile and she ultimately relents, the Muses having "taunt[ed] her into honesty". "I Won't Say (I'm in Love)" is also the only song in which the Muses duet with one of the film's main characters. During one scene, the Muses transform themselves into stone busts, which Amory Rose of Business Insider believes is a possible reference to The Haunted Mansion attraction at Disneyland. Excerpts from "I Won't Say (I'm in Love)" are also used in some of the film's score, one of the few songs to do this.

Filmtracks.com described "I Won't Say (I'm in Love)" as the film's "standard 'female song of longing'." According to Taylor Weatherby of Billboard, the character "finally comes to a conclusion to which many a girl (or guy) can relate". Tracy Dye of Bustle described the scene: "Joined by The Muses, Meg attempts to vehemently deny her amour for Hercules", and Zahraa Schroeder of Smile 90.4FM described it as "Meg’s brain fighting her heart". Additionally, the musical number predicts that one of Hercules' most difficult challenges will be trying to change Meg's opinion of him. Writing for The Daily Dot, Aja Romano cited the song as Meg's "I Want" song, whereas USA Today's Patrick Ryan labeled it as the film's 11 o'clock number. In addition to her conflicted feelings about Hercules, "I Won't Say (I'm in Love)" also demonstrates Meg's independence.

== Music and lyrics ==
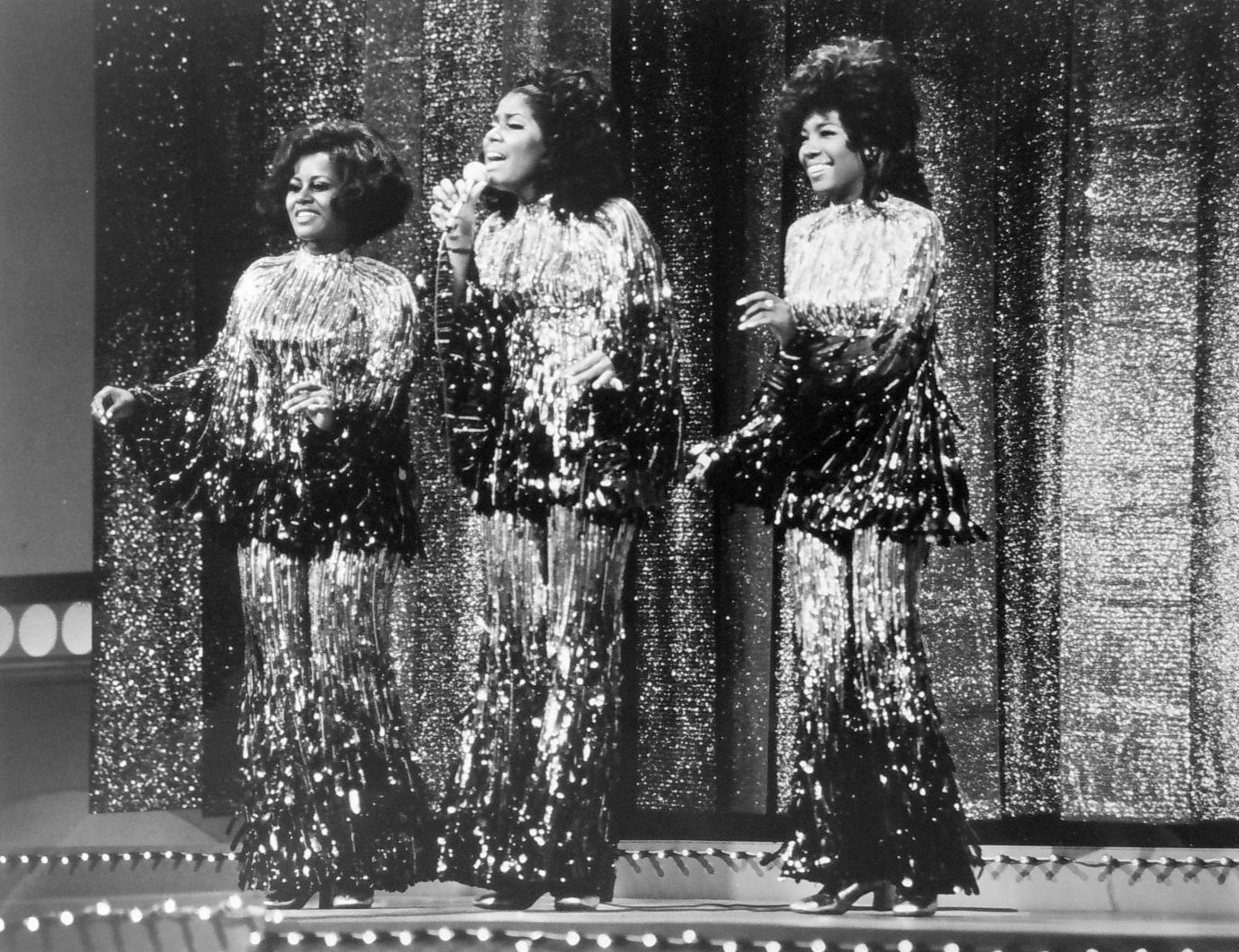
The song's background vocals and doo-wop arrangement have been compared to the work of American girl group the Supremes.

Lasting two minutes and twenty seconds in duration, "I Won't Say (I'm in Love)" is performed "freely" in the key of C major at a tempo of 100 beats per minute. A mellow 1960s girl group song, Egan delivers the power ballad in a sultry manner. The mid-tempo pop ballad incorporates elements of R&B, doo-wop, and gospel, genres that deviate from the theatrical romantic ballads typically featured in Disney musicals. The song is also slower and more understated than most of the film's soundtrack. Musically, Irving Tan of Sputnikmusic described the track as "the closest the Herculean villa ever comes to approximating a Broadway show", while Ella Ceron of Thought Catalog called it "a pop song made on Olympus". It features "cooing shooby-doos and sha-la-las" from the Muses, who contribute gospel-influenced backup vocals and riffs. Vulture's Lindsey Weber described it as "a traditional Disney [heroine's] lament" with a "unique Motown edge". Allison Shoemaker of Consequence likened the Muses to a Greek chorus. Combined, the lead and background vocals span two octaves, from G_{3} to C_{5}. Egan's voice has been described as sarcastic, smoky, and soulful. Although the Muses are voiced by five singers, the song is only performed in three-part harmony. "I Won't Say (I'm in Love)" has been compared to the works of girl groups The Ronettes, The Supremes, and The Blossoms.

25-second sample of the doo-wop song, featuring Egan's voice accompanied by girl group-style back up vocals performed in three-part harmony.

Lyrically, "I Won't Say (I'm in Love) is a "torchy" love song about denial, specifically its performer's reluctance to fall in love or surrender to romantic clichés. Meg voices how clichéd and insufficient love can feel, while mocking traditional love song tropes. "I Won't Say (I'm in Love)" differs from standard Disney love songs by offering "a unique spin" on the heroine's dilemma. Rob Burch of The Hollywood News dubbed "I Won't Say (I'm in Love)" an "anti-love song". Described as an "emotional barnstormer", the song begins with Egan singing "If there's a prize for rotten judgment I guess I've already won that", soon followed by "Been there, done that". Thought Catalog's Chelsea Fagan believes the first verse "sums up in four lines everything that we’ve ever tried to convey while on our third drink out at the bar with the girls", joking, "I believe this song would come shortly after dancing in a circle with all women, but just before the tearful texting of your ex". Lyrics such as "No man is worth the aggravation / that’s ancient history, been there done that” and “I thought my heart had learned its lesson / It feels so good when you start out / My head is screaming get a grip girl / Unless you’re dying to cry your heart out” express Meg's initial distaste for romance, only for the Muses to encourage her to admit that she is falling in love. Musicological Identities: Essays in Honor of Susan McClary author Jacqueline Warwick observed that the backup singers constantly contradict the lead singer in a call and response format, proving crucial to the denial theme. The Muses suggest that Meg “Face it like a grown-up/When you gonna own up that you got got got it bad”, which Gantz described "admonishing". The song's last line is: "At least out loud, I won’t say I’m in love". Identifying the track as a "self-aware ballad...filled with sly anachronisms", author Thomas S. Hischak observed it maintains the soundtrack's comedic tone in his book 100 Greatest American and British Animated Films. Meg Pelliccio of Screen Rant believes the Muses ending the song with "Sha-la-la-la-la-la" could possibly be a reference to "Kiss the Girl" from The Little Mermaid (1989), which share both composers and directors, and involve supporting characters attempting to convince a main character of their feelings through song.

Kate Knibbs of The Ringer summarized the track as "a love song from someone who doesn’t want to be in love, who knows enough to assume things aren’t going to work out". Fagan believes it expresses "the hesitancy savvy women everywhere feel when trying to stop themselves from falling head over heels". Hischak deemed "I Won't Say (I'm in Love)" a "contradictory love song ... in which Meg denies her true feelings yet admits that she is quite taken with the brawny and naive hero Hercules". According to D23, "I Won't Say (I'm in Love)" is a love song "For those who don’t want to admit their hearts’ desires". Additionally, some critics have observed feminist messages in the song's lyrics.

== Reception ==
"I Won't Say (I'm in Love)" has received positive reviews from film and music critics. Rolling Stone Australia's Barry Levitt called it excellent, and Aja Romano of The Daily Dot described it as a Hercules highlight that "satisfies us every time". Writing for IndieWire, Greg Ehbar named "I Won't Say (I'm in Love)" his favorite song from the film, describing it as "truly great tune". Irving Tan of Sputnikmusic said the Muses' "pillow talk skills are right up there with the best of them". Tan concluded, "The track also works well as an alternative to modern pop's teenage heartbreak music", recommending that younger fans listen to it over artists such as Hilary Duff.

BBC Music Magazine's Sean Wilson reviewed it as "a witty, smart number ... Blessed with an extremely catchy melody and some clever lyrics". Tracy Dye of Bustle hailed the track as "one of Disney's most addictive pieces of ear-candy", appreciating that "it veers from the typical love-laced ballads we're used to". Similarly, Rob Burch of The Hollywood News called "I Won't Say (I'm in Love)" a "refreshing change of pace". Nylon's Taylor Bryant called it an impeccable song that remains "very much in line with the company's ethos". Meanwhile, Jerrica Tisdale of CinemaBlend crowned the ballad the best song from Hercules. MovieWeb's Micaela Pérez Vitale agreed that it is the film's best song, complimenting "its high-energy and fun rhythm". Both Ticketmaster contributor Caitlin Devlin and Matt Singer of ScreenCrush consider "I Won't Say (I'm in Love)" to be among Disney's greatest songs.

Screen Rant ranked "I Won't Say (I'm in Love)" Hercules' second best song, with author Matthew Wilkinson praising Meg's independence and Egan's performance. Conversely, Filmtracks.com accused the song of wasting Egan's talent.

== Live performances and cover versions ==
Egan has performed "I Won't Say (I'm in Love)" live on several occasions. At the 2017 D23 Expo to conclude the event's "Zero to Hero: The Making of Hercules" panel, the original animated sequence was played in the background while Egan sang, accompanied by backup vocalists. The performance was met with a standing ovation from the audience. Egan has also sang the song during the Broadway Princess Party concert series in 2019 and 2020. During an October 2019 performance, Egan performed a duet arrangement with actress Krysta Rodriguez, who originated the role of Meg in a stage adaptation of Hercules (2019) and sang the song in the show. In April 2020, Egan performed "I Won't Say (I'm in Love)" as part of Disney's #DisneySingAlong social media campaign. The video was recorded in her own home due to quarantining measures as a result of the COVID-19 pandemic, while Broadway actors Courtney Reed, Laura Osnes, Adam J. Levy and Benjamin Rauhala provided background vocals as The Muses.

To promote the film, American singer Belinda Carlisle recorded a pop rock cover of "I Won't Say (I'm in Love)" in 1997, which was included on the film's soundtrack. Produced by Gary Wallis and Toby Chapman, Carlisle's version was released as a single exclusively in France and Germany, on May 26, 1997. The single garnered critical acclaim. American girl group The Cheetah Girls covered the song for the 2005 compilation album Disneymania 3 marking the group's first song as a trio. Their version exchanges harmonizing for handclaps while emphasizing the pop aspects of the song over R&B. The cover was released as a single. Writing for idobi, Sam Devotta felt The Cheetah Girls' version "lacks the power [and frustration] of the original", preferring Egan's interpretation. An abridged version of "I Won't Say (I'm in Love)" appears on stage in the jukebox musical Disney's on the Record, performed by Andrew Samonsky, with Meredith Inglesby, Andy Karl, Tyler Maynard and Keewa Nurullah providing backup vocals. Singer and music teacher Evynne Hollens released a cover of "I Won't Say (I'm in Love)" as a single in 2017.

In April 2020, singer Ariana Grande performed a cover of the song on the ABC special Disney Family Singalong. Grande's rendition received acclaim from critics and fans. Billboard named Grande's performance as one of the 10 best moments from the special, stating that Grande "got in full make up and costume, paying homage to Meg by wearing all purple, for the tender and vocally stunning video that she completed with a flower as her only prop. But with a voice like hers, what more do you need?" Bill Keveney of USA Today stated that Grande had "the most professional-looking performance". Monica Sisavat of Popsugar praised Grande's rendition calling it a "gorgeous rendition of Hercules's 'I Won't Say (I'm in Love)' from her home."

In August 2026, girl group Katseye performed a cover of the song at the 2026 Disney Legends ceremony, where Egan was honored as a Disney Legend.

== Impact and legacy ==
"I Won't Say I'm in Love" has been included on various Disney song rankings by several media publications. According to Good Housekeeping, "I Won't Say (I'm in Love)" is the 12th best Disney song of all-time. In 2024, Time named "I Won't Say (I'm in Love)" the 18th best Disney song, and Cosmopolitan ranked it 39th. Dalin Rowell of /Film called it "one of the greatest songs in Disney history", and Billboard named it the 45th greatest song from the "Disneyverse", out of 100. Beamly ranked it fifth on the website's list of "Best Ever Disney Songs", with author Sophie Hall nicknaming Meg "The Celine Dion of the cartoon world". BuzzFeed and D23 ranked the song Disney's ninth and 10th greatest love song, respectively, while Comic Book Resources ranked it sixth. USA Today ranked it the ninth-best "classic" Disney song, which author Patrick Ryan said "strike[s] just the right balance of side-eye and sweetness". In an article describing the song as "one of the greatest g-rated love songs of the last century", Time Out ranked "I Won't Say (I'm in Love)" the seventh-best Disney song. Billboard named it the 21st best song of the Disney Renaissance. Consequence ranked it the 61st best Disney song of all-time, and UDiscoverMusic ranked it 34th. While ranking it Disney's 36th best song, The Ringer welcomed "I Won't Say (I'm in Love)" as "a refreshing change of pace for Disney" that in turn makes Meg "a relatable queen". Meanwhile, umusic NZ ranked it the eighth-best Disney Princess song. MovieWeb ranked it Menken's 10th best original composition, describing the song as a "cultural reset". In 2022, The Scotsman reported that "I Won't Say (I'm in Love)" was the 22nd most streamed Disney song on Spotify, having amassed nearly 207 million streams.

Contrarily, "I Won't Say (I'm in Love)" has earned a reputation as one of Disney's most underrated songs. While ranking the track the 16th best song of the Disney Renaissance, Syfy Wire's Caitlin Busch called Meg "an underrated heroine with an underrated love song", which she described as "funny, poignant, and a perfect transition". Moviepilot included the song in a similar listicle, with author Jeremiah Paul describing it as a "hidden gem" and praising Egan's performance. Jerrica Tisdale of CinemaBlend described the song's underappreciation as "nearly criminal". Calling it one of Disney's 12 most underrated classic songs, Billboard's Aly Semigran said the song deserves to be a "karaoke mainstay".

In an interview with music magazine The Fader, members of American rapper Chance the Rapper's band The Social Experiment identified "I Won't Say (I'm in Love)" one of the favorite Disney songs from their childhood. TodayTix named the song "everyone’s favorite Disney feminist anthem".

== Credits and personnel ==
Credits adapted from Apple Music:

- Susan Egan – lead vocals
- Cheryl Freeman, Lillias White, Vaneese Thomas, LaChanze, and Roz Ryan – background vocals
- Michael Kosarin – vocal conductor, vocal arranger
- John Miller, Bobbi Page, Fonzi Thornton – performer
- Alan Menken – composer
- David Zippel – lyrics
- Danny Troob – orchestrator, arranger
- Brian Besterman, Michael Starobin – orchestrator

== Certifications ==
Region	Certification	Certified units/sales
United Kingdom (BPI)	Silver	200,000^{‡}
United States (RIAA)	2× Platinum	2,000,000^{‡}
^{‡} Sales+streaming figures based on certification alone.
