= I Don't Want Our Loving to Die =

Single by The Herd
- B-side: "Our Fairy Tale"
- Released: 29 March 1968
- Genre: Pop
- Length: 2:59
- Label: Fontana
- Songwriters: Ken Howard; Alan Blaikley
- Producer: Steve Rowland

The Herd singles chronology
"Paradise Lost" (1967)	"I Don't Want Our Loving to Die" (1968)	"Sunshine Cottage" (1968)

"I Don't Want Our Loving to Die" is a single by the English rock band the Herd, released in March 1968. Written by Ken Howard and Alan Blaikley, it was the last of the band's three hits on the UK Singles Chart and their most successful, reaching number five in May 1968. The song was generally well received by the music press, with several critics noting its contrast against the Herd's previous hit singles.

== Background and composition ==
"I Don't Want Our Loving to Die" marked a change in style for the Herd, dispensing with the orchestral arrangements and classical allusions that had marked their two previous singles "From the Underworld" and "Paradise Lost". The band wished to replicate the sound they achieved in live performances and referred to the song's syncopated rhythm as "rock-ska". Speaking after the song's release, frontman Peter Frampton commented "a lot of people said the big sound was our style but we knew it wasn't, so we decided to do our sound on the next single".

The song features a semi-spoken word introduction and a prominent Hammond organ part by Andy Bown. Peter Jones summarised its lyric as "a boy-girl storyline; he plays the field but really goes for one special chick."

== Release ==
"I Don't Want Our Loving to Die", backed with Bown and Frampton's own composition "Our Fairy Tale", was released by Fontana on 29 March 1968. The group promoted the single on television and radio with appearances on BBC1's All Systems Freeman (22 March), BBC Radio 1's Saturday Club (23 March) and the Light Programme's Joe Loss Pop Show (5 April). It peaked at number five on the UK Singles Chart and ultimately spent 13 weeks on the chart, matching "From the Underworld". It was the group's final hit single and their last collaboration with managers and songwriters Ken Howard and Alan Blaikley, with whom they subsequently entered a contractual dispute. Frampton later described the chart peak of "I Don't Want Our Loving to Die" as "when things started to deteriorate with the Herd".

== Reception ==
Writing in the New Musical Express, Derek Johnson deemed "I Don't Want Our Loving to Die" "more in the Dave Dee mould" than the Herd's previous hits and praised the band's vocal blend and "bouncy beat". Peter Jones for Record Mirror considered the song "much more like it for the Herd" with "a sort of rock-blue beat sound to round it all off". Chris Welch of Melody Maker praised what he called a "shouting, joyful rave-up" and considered it more representative of the Herd's "own distinctive sound" than their "heavily orchestrated" previous single "Paradise Lost". Conversely, Penny Valentine of Disc and Music Echo felt that the Herd had no real style of their own and consequently "on this record it could quite honestly it could be anyone singing – I hasten to add that it's good and very commercial". Valentine considered the song musically similar to the Easybeats' "The Music Goes 'Round My Head".

== Charts ==
Chart (1968)	Peak position
Ireland (IRMA)	5
New Zealand (Listener)	4
UK Singles (OCC)	5
West Germany (GfK)	33
