= Henry Spinetti =

Welsh drummer (born 1951)

- Born: Henry Anthony George Spinetti; 31 March 1951 (age 75); Cwm, Monmouthshire, Wales
- Origin: Cardiff, Glamorgan, Wales
- Genres: Rock; pop
- Occupations: Musician; session musician
- Instruments: Drums; percussion
- Years active: 1960s–present
- Formerly of: The Herd, Judas Jump, Eric Clapton's touring band

Henry Anthony George Spinetti (born 31 March 1951) is a Welsh session drummer whose playing has featured on many prominent rock and pop albums. Spinetti has recorded on over fifty albums, as well as on film, television, and radio. He has worked with artists including Paul McCartney, George Harrison, Eric Clapton, Tina Turner, Joan Armatrading, Gary Brooker, and Andy Fairweather Low.

== Early life ==
Spinetti was born in Cwm, Monmouthshire, Wales, one of six children to Giuseppe and Lily (née Watson), who owned a chip shop. He is of Italian descent through his paternal grandfather, who is said to have walked to Wales from Italy in order to work as a coal miner so he could buy a plough. Spinetti is the younger brother of actor Victor Spinetti (1929–2012).

== Career ==
Spinetti started playing drums at age twelve, after hearing The Beatles.

His first band, when aged 12-13, was The Toby Four (named after Toby beer), which rehearsed in the Ambray Hotel and played songs by The Shadows, amongst others. Spinetti turned professional when he was sixteen. He then joined a group called The Choice from Tredegar, with a guitarist influenced by Jimi Hendrix. After this he joined Cardiff band The Clockwork Motion, which played as far afield as Newcastle and Birmingham, with Spinetti playing a Premier Black Pearl drum kit. He then secured an audition for London band Floribunda Rose. He travelled to London, with his drums, on the train, and went to the band's flat in Earl's Court; he played four or five numbers and got the job. The band changed its name to Scrugg and went to the Top 10 Club in Hamburg.

Spinetti began his recording career with Scrugg, with the Pye label. Band members included fellow Welshman Jack Russell, Christos Demetriou and the South African singer-songwriter, John Kongos. In the early 1970s, Spinetti appeared with Kongos on BBC Television's Top of the Pops performing Kongos' hit single, "He's Gonna Step on You Again". After leaving Scrugg, Spinetti joined The Herd in 1968, who at this point were in the final months of their career, a short time before the departure of their lead singer Peter Frampton, who left after the commercial failure of the first single recorded with Spinetti, "Sunshine Cottage", and formed Humble Pie. After Frampton left in late 1968, the group carried on as a trio, and released their final single, "The Game", before calling it a day.

After the Herd, Spinetti joined Judas Jump, a progressive rock supergroup whose members had worked with and would eventually work with bands includin the Herd, Amen Corner, Poco, and Status Quo. Judas Jump were the opening act at the Isle of Wight Festival 1970. The Herd and Judas Jump included keyboardist Andy Bown, who later joined Status Quo. Spinetti was also a member of the UK band Hustler, which released two albums—High Street (1974) and Play Loud (1975), the latter produced by Roy Thomas Baker.

Spinetti played drums for Joan Armatrading for her debut album, Whatever's for Us, as well as accompanying her on stage; he later returned to playing live for Armatrading in 1990. In 1974, Spinetti played drums live for Neil Sedaka. From 1979 to 1982, he was the drummer for Eric Clapton. Spinetti played on eight of the ten tracks on Gerry Rafferty's album City to City, (including the hit "Baker Street"), and also played in the 2002 memorial concert for George Harrison, "The Concert For George". In 2011 Spinetti recorded with Andy Bown again, playing drums on Bown's solo album, Unfinished Business.

Spinetti is a member of the Musicians' Union.

== Personal life ==
Spinetti married Susan Styles in Coventry, Warwickshire, England in 2004. He had been married before, and subsequently divorced; he has two sons.

== Recording credits ==
Spinetti's recording credits include the following:

With Joan Armatrading

- Whatever's for Us (Cube Records, 1972)
- Show Some Emotion (A&M Records, 1977)
- To the Limit (A&M Records, 1978)

With Vicki Brown

- Lady of Time (RCA Victor, 1989)

With Chanter Sisters

- Shoulder to Shoulder (Safari, 1978)

With Eric Clapton

- Another Ticket (RSO Records, 1981)
- August (Warner Bros. Records, 1986)
- Old Sock (Surfdog Records, 2013)
- I Still Do (Surfdog Records, 2016)

With Roger Daltrey

- Ride a Rock Horse (Track Records, 1975)

With Bob Dylan

- Down in the Groove (Columbia Records, 1988)

With Roger Chapman

- Chappo (Arista Records, 1979)
- Hybrid and Lowdown (Polydor Records, 1990)

With George Harrison

- Gone Troppo (Dark Horse Records, 1982)

With Paul McCartney

- CHOBA B CCCP (Melodiya, 1988)

With Katie Melua

- Call Off the Search (Dramatico, 2003)
- Piece by Piece (Dramatico, 2005)
- Pictures (Dramatico, 2007)
- The House (Dramatico, 2010)
- Secret Symphony (Dramatico, 2012)
- Ketevan (Dramatico, 2013)

With Gerry Rafferty

- Can I Have My Money Back? (Line Records, 1972)
- City to City (United Artists Records, 1978)

With Cliff Richard

- Stronger (EMI, 1989)

With Leo Sayer

- Silverbird (Chrysalis Records, 1973)

With Pete Townshend and Ronnie Lane

- Rough Mix (MCA, 1977)

With Bonnie Tyler

- Diamond Cut (RCA Records, 1978)

With Gary Brooker

- Echoes in the Night (Line Music Gmbh - Phonogram, 1985)

With Procol Harum

- The Prodigal Stranger (Zoo Entertainment, 1991)

With Bill Wyman

- Groovin' (Roadrunner Records, 2000)
