= Sweet Soulful Music =

Studio album by Andy Fairweather Low
- Released: August 2006
- Recorded: 18–29 April 2005
- Studio: Sphere Studios, London
- Genre: Rock
- Label: Proper Records
- Producer: Glyn Johns

Andy Fairweather Low chronology
Mega Shebang (1980)	Sweet Soulful Music (2006)	Best of Andy Fairweather Low – Low Rider (2008)

Professional ratings
Review scores
Source	Rating
AllMusic	4/5 stars
Blender	3.5/5 stars

Sweet Soulful Music, released in August 2006, was Andy Fairweather Low's first solo album in twenty six years. It reunited Low with producer Glyn Johns.

== Track listing ==
All tracks composed by Andy Fairweather Low; except where indicated

1. "One More Rocket"
2. "Hymn 4 My Soul"
3. "What'd You Take Me to Be"
4. "Ashes and Diamonds"
5. "Bible Black Starless Sky"
6. "Don't Stand"
7. "Life Ain't No Competition"
8. "Zazzy"
9. "Low Rider"
10. "Unbroken Love"
11. "I Don't Need"
12. "Sweet Soulful Music"
13. "Life Is Good"
14. "When I Grow Too Old to Dream" (Oscar Hammerstein II, Sigmund Romberg)

== Personnel ==
- Andy Fairweather Low – vocals, guitar, ukulele, mandolin, harmonica
- Dave Bronze – bass
- Henry Spinetti – drums, percussion
- John "Rabbit" Bundrick – organ, piano
- Katie Kissoon, Carol Kenyon, P. P. Arnold – backing vocals
