= Unfinished Business (Andy Bown album) =

2011 album by Andy Brown

Studio album by Andy Bown
- Released: September 2011
- Label: Cherry Red Records

Unfinished Business is an album by Andy Bown, currently the keyboard player in Status Quo and a former member of Judas Jump and The Herd. The album was Bown's first solo album since joining Status Quo in 1976, and was released by Cherry Red Records in September 2011.

A music video was made to accompany the lead song "Rubber Gloves", which was produced and directed by John Keeling, and recorded at Richmond Studios, London, England. The video clip was included as the enhanced portion of the original CD release.

In 2019, the album was reissued by NoCut Entertainment with new artwork and an additional song "Dancing in the Rain".

== Track listing ==
All songs written by Andy Bown.

1. "Ruby and Roy"
2. "Rubber Gloves"
3. "A Matter of Time"
4. "When the Lights Went On"
5. "Keeping the Wolf Away"
6. "Right as Ninepence"
7. "I Got a Million"
8. "Tick My Box"
9. "Built to Last"
10. "A Good Innings"

== Personnel ==
- Andy Bown – vocals, keyboards, guitars, harmonica
- Mick Rogers – guitars
- Trevor Bolder – bass on all songs except tracks 1, 2, 4 & 10
- Brad Lang – bass on tracks 1, 2, 4 & 10
- Henry Spinetti – drums
- Juliet Rogers and Sylvia Mason-James – backing vocals
- Mike Paxman – producer
