= Paradise Lost (Herd song) =

- US fold-out sleeve

Single by The Herd

from the album Paradise Lost
- B-side: "Come On–Believe Me"
- Released: 1 December 1967
- Genre: Psychedelic pop
- Length: 3:33
- Label: Fontana
- Songwriters: Ken Howard; Alan Blaikley
- Producer: Steve Rowland

The Herd singles chronology
"From the Underworld" (1967)	"Paradise Lost" (1967)	"I Don't Want Our Loving to Die" (1968)

"Paradise Lost" is a single by the English rock band the Herd, released in December 1967. Written by Ken Howard and Alan Blaikley, it was the follow-up to the group's first hit "From the Underworld". Unlike its predecessor, it failed to reach the top ten on the UK Singles Chart, peaking at number 15. It was later included on the group's only studio album, Paradise Lost (1968).

== Background and recording ==
According to songwriters Howard and Blaikley, the lyrics of "Paradise Lost" bear no relation to the Milton poem of the same name. The song presents the perspective of "a fellow who's drowning his sorrows in a sleazy strip joint, while he reflects sadly on the loss of his youthful innocence", according to Derek Johnson of the New Musical Express. The verses, sung by Peter Frampton, are accompanied by an arrangement similar to that of "From the Underground", with trumpet, strings, and celesta prominent. They are sandwiched between two jazz sections reminiscent of David Rose's 1958 composition "The Stripper", creating a musical contrast and illustrating the gulf between the narrator's thoughts and his environment.

== Release ==
"Paradise Lost", backed with "Come On–Believe Me", was released by Fontana on 1 December 1967, ahead of the Herd's five-date tour of Scotland. Originally to have been issued on 17 November, the single was pushed back due to the prolonged chart success of "From the Underworld". The group promoted the song with television appearances on Crackerjack (12 December) and Dee Time (23 December). It peaked at number 15 on the UK Singles Chart, spending nine weeks on the chart. It was ultimately the least successful of the Herd's three hit singles.

In the week following the single's release, New Musical Express readers voted the Herd the sixth "Best New Group" of 1967, behind the Bee Gees, Traffic, the Tremeloes, Procol Harum and the Jimi Hendrix Experience. Peter Frampton was voted the ninth best "New Disc Singer".

== Critical reception ==
The song received a warm reception upon release. Writing in the New Musical Express, Derek Johnson praised the "evocative and highly commercial" song, singling out the "urgent, attacking style of young Peter Frampton, commanding sympathy and appeal in this expressive and wistful lyric". Penny Valentine of Disc and Music Echo considered the song similar to "From the Underworld", due to the "doomy backing and Frampton's clawing away in front". Peter Jones of Record Mirror was positive, commenting "Tremendous. This group ... tremendous. Very tough and rough and commercial." Chris Welch of Melody Maker considered it "a piece of advanced pop writing" and noted how the "reverie" section is "sandwiched callously between brash stripper music, creating a violent contrast". Ray Connolly for the Evening Standard was less favourable, describing it as "a continuation of 'From the Underworld', which an awful lot of you bought despite my reservations. I don't really care terribly for this record either, but it would be caddish of me to criticise such a pretty lad as Peter Frampton."

== Charts ==
Chart (1967–1968)	Peak position
Netherlands (Dutch Top 40)	22
Netherlands (Single Top 100)	13
New Zealand (Listener)	18
UK Singles (OCC)	15
West Germany (GfK)	22
