= (If Paradise Is) Half as Nice =

1968 Italian song with multiple covers

"(If Paradise Is) Half as Nice" is a popular 1968 song. Originally written by the Italian singer-songwriter Lucio Battisti under the title "Il paradiso" ("The Paradise"), it was first recorded by Italian singer Ambra Borelli and released as a single through Dischi Ricordi under alias La Ragazza 77. Although her version did not chart, it was later covered by other artists to much success, most notably by Patty Pravo (in Italian) and Amen Corner (in English) in 1969.

== Patty Pravo version ==
"Il paradiso"

Single by Patty Pravo

from the album Concerto per Patty
- Released: 1969
- Genre: Pop; beat
- Length: 2:44
- Label: RCA Italiana
- Songwriters: Lucio Battisti; Giulio Rapetti Mogol

Patty Pravo singles chronology
| "Tripoli 1969" (1968) | "Il paradiso" (1969) | "Concerto per Patty" (1969) |
- "Il paradiso" (audio) on YouTube

Patty Pravo recorded the song under the shortened title "Il paradiso" for her second studio album Concerto per Patty. The track was released as a single in early 1969 and reached the top 10 in the Italian chart. It was performed at Festivalbar. Pravo re-recorded the song on her 2019 album Red to mark the 50th anniversary of the original version.

=== Track listing ===
- 7-inch single

A. "Il paradiso" (Lucio Battisti, Giulio Rapetti Mogol) – 2:44
B. "Scende la notte, sale la luna" (Gianni Meccia, Bruno Zambrini) – 3:03

=== Charts ===
==== Weekly charts ====
| Chart (1969) | Peak position |
|---|---|
| Italy (Musica e dischi) | 8 |

== Amen Corner version ==
"(If Paradise Is) Half as Nice"

Single by Amen Corner

from the album Farewell to the Real Magnificent Seven
- Released: 1969
- Genre: Pop rock
- Length: 2:50
- Label: Immediate
- Songwriters: Lucio Battisti; Jack Fishman
- Producer: Shel Talmy

Amen Corner singles chronology
| "High in the Sky" (1968) | "(If Paradise Is) Half as Nice" (1969) | "Let the Good Times Roll and Feel So Good" (1969) |

The song was translated into English by Jack Fishman. When it was offered to The Tremeloes as a potential single, they rejected it. It was then recorded by Welsh band Amen Corner as their debut single for their new record label, Immediate Records, and was produced by Shel Talmy. The most successful of the band's six hit singles, it reached number one on the UK Singles Chart for two weeks in February 1969, and number 34 when it was reissued in 1976. There are two differing versions of the song by Amen Corner; one with orchestra and a prominent horn through the middle eight bars, and one version without either. However, the basic track and vocals appear the same in both.

=== Track listing ===
- 7" single

A. "(If Paradise Is) Half as Nice" (Lucio Battisti, Jack Fishman) – 2:50
B. "Hey Hey Girl" (Andy Fairweather Low) – 3:05

=== Charts ===
| Chart (1969) | Peak position |
|---|---|
| Austria (Ö3 Austria Top 40) | 14 |
| Belgium (Ultratop Flanders) | 15 |
| Belgium (Ultratop Wallonia) | 27 |
| Germany (Media Control) | 12 |
| Ireland (IRMA) | 4 |
| Netherlands (Single Top 100) | 15 |
| Norway (VG-lista) | 7 |
| UK Singles Chart (OCC) | 1 |

== Other cover versions ==
- The Dave Clark Five covered the song in 1969 and released as a single only in the US.
- Christiane Bervoets, known professionally as Samantha, recorded the song in Dutch as "Vakantiedromen" in 1969.
- The song was covered by Toby Jug and released in Australia in 1970, where it peaked at number 65.
- In 1978, Northern Irish pop rock band Rosetta Stone recorded the song for their self-titled debut album and released it as a single. It charted at number 20 in Germany.
- In 1987, Bucks Fizz member Cheryl Baker recorded the song and released it as a single. It charted at number 94 in the UK.
- Ricchi e Poveri covered the song on their 1992 album Allegro italiano.
- Aztec Camera did a cover with the help of Andy Fairweather Low from Amen Corner for the 1992 compilation album Ruby Trax.
- German actress and singer Judith Hildebrandt recorded the English version of the song on her 1999 album Judith. It was released as a single and reached number 90 in Germany.
- In 2010, mother and daughter Norma Waterson and Eliza Carthy recorded a medley of the song with "Ukulele Lady" on their album Gift.
