= Fair Weather (band) =

British rock band

- Origin: England
- Genres: Hard rock, pop
- Years active: 1970–1971
- Label: RCA Records
- Past members: Andy Fairweather Low; Blue Weaver; Dennis Bryon; Clive Taylor; Neil Jones

Fair Weather was a British rock band formed in 1970 by former Amen Corner guitarist and singer Andy Fairweather Low. They are best known for their track "Natural Sinner".

== Biography ==
The band evolved from a split within Amen Corner. While saxophone player Allan Jones went on to form Judas Jump, Fairweather Low led Dennis Bryon (drums), Blue Weaver (organ), Clive Taylor (bass) and Neil Jones (guitar) into the new band, Fair Weather. The band scored a UK Singles Chart Number 6 hit with "Natural Sinner" in 1970 and recorded one album, Beginning From An End. From the latter were drawn three more singles, "Lay It On Me"/"Looking for the Red Label Pt. 2", "Tutti Frutti"/"Road To Freedom" and "Poor Man's Bum A Run"/"Don't Mess with Cupid". None charted and Fair Weather disbanded in 1971.

Fairweather Low went on to a successful solo career before taking up regular work with Eric Clapton, George Harrison and Roger Waters.

Weaver joined Strawbs and became an in-demand session player with Mott the Hoople, Pet Shop Boys and the Bee Gees. Bryon also became the Bee Gees' drummer.

== Discography ==
=== Albums ===
- Beginning From An End (1971)
  - "God Cried Mother"
  - "Don' Mess With Cupid"
  - "Dead and Past"
  - "I Hear You Knocking"
  - "You Ain't No Friend"
  - "Sit and Think"
  - "Looking for the Red Label"
  - "Poor Man's Bum a Run"
  - "Natural Sinner"
  - "Haven't I Tried"
  - "Tutti Frutti"
  - "Road to Freedom"
  - "Lay It on Me"
  - "Looking for the Red Label, Pt. 2"
- Let Your Mind Roll On (1972 - Germany only - Hansa Records; re-released in 2007 by Dynamic Records)
  - "Let Your Mind Roll On"
  - "Blues Today"
  - "Bring Down the Wall"
  - "Love My Home"
  - "Mona Lisa"
  - "Blue Blue Mohair Suit Shuffler"
  - "Misfortune by My Goodluck Sign"
  - "Hush Hush Push No Evil"
  - "Live off the Land"
  - "Karate Boogaloo"
  - "Lay It on Me"

=== Singles ===
- "Natural Sinner" (1970) - RCA (RCA 1977) - No. 6 UK
- "Lay It On Me"
- "Tutti Frutti"
- "Poor Man's Bum A Run"

== See also ==
- List of performers on Top of the Pops
