= Natural Sinner =

1970 single by Fair Weather

- Cover of the single released in the Netherlands

Single by Fair Weather
- B-side: "Haven't I Tried (To Be a Good Man)"
- Released: 3 July 1970
- Genre: Rock
- Length: 4:24
- Label: RCA Victor
- Songwriter(s): Andy Fairweather Low
- Producer(s): Andy Fairweather Low

Fair Weather singles chronology
"Natural Sinner" (1970)	"Road to Freedom" (1970)

"Natural Sinner" is a song by British rock band Fair Weather, released in July 1970 as their debut single. It peaked at number 6 on the UK Singles Chart.

== Release ==
Fair Weather was formed after the disbandment of Amen Corner, with the name coming from frontman Andy Fairweather Low. "Natural Sinner" was the band's release, as a non-album single, despite releasing an album, Beginning from the End, at the end of the year. Despite releasing further singles, "Natural Sinner" was the band's only hit and they split in 1972.

== Track listing ==
7": RCA / RCA 1977

1. "Natural Sinner" – 4:24
2. "Haven't I Tried (To Be A Good Man)" – 4:09

== Personnel ==
- Andy Fairweather Low – vocals, guitar
- Blue Weaver – organ
- Neil Jones – guitar
- Clive Taylor – bass
- Dennis Byron – drums

== Charts ==
Chart (1970)	Peak position
Belgium (Ultratop 50 Flanders)	14
Belgium (Ultratop 50 Wallonia)	49
Germany (GfK)	24
Ireland (IRMA)	10
Netherlands (Dutch Top 40)	26
Netherlands (Single Top 100)	21
UK Singles (OCC)	6

== Cover versions ==
- In 1970, German band leader James Last covered the song on his album Non Stop Dancing 11.
- In 1971, American R&B vocalist Lloyd Price released a cover as a single.
- In 1994, a cover by Elton John, recorded in 1970, was released on his compilation album Chartbusters Go Pop.
- In 2008, Andy Fairweather Low released a solo version on his compilation album The Very Best of Andy Fairweather Low – The Low Rider.
