= Gin House Blues =

Single by Amen Corner
- B-side: "I Know"
- Released: July 1967
- Recorded: 1967
- Genre: Blues, blues-rock
- Length: 3:12
- Label: Deram Records – DM 136
- Songwriters: credited to Fletcher Henderson and Henry Troy (A-side); Andy Fairweather Low (B-side)
- Producer: Noel Walker

Amen Corner singles chronology
"Gin House Blues" (1967)	""The World of Broken Hearts"" (1967)

"Gin House Blues" is the title of two different blues songs, which have become confused over the years. Both songs were first recorded by Bessie Smith.

The song originally titled "Gin House Blues" was written in 1925 by Fletcher Henderson with lyrics by Henry Troy, and recorded by Bessie Smith with Henderson on 18 March 1926. It has the opening lines "I've got a sad sad story today / I'm goin' to the gin house when the whistle blows..."

However, the song now most usually called "Gin House" or "Gin House Blues" – with the opening lines "Stay away from me 'cause I'm in my sin / If this place gets raided, it's just me and my gin..." – is an entirely different song. It was originally entitled "Me and My Gin", and was recorded by Bessie Smith on 25 August 1928 and released on Columbia 14384-D. It was written by "Harry Burke", which may be a pseudonym of the pianist and songwriter James C. Johnson. It is this song which has been recorded by many musicians over the years under the title "Gin House Blues" (see listing below), with authorship usually credited to Henderson and Troy, apparently in error.

== Recorded versions of "Me and My Gin" under the title "Gin House Blues" ==
- Bessie Smith – first recorded under the title "Me and My Gin" on 25 August 1928, in New York City and issued as Columbia 14384-D; she also recorded a different song called 'Gin House Blues', with Fletcher Henderson, on 18 March 1926.
- Amen Corner – released the song as a single in 1967; it reached Number 12 in the UK Singles Chart. Andy Fairweather Low, the band's lead singer, has continued to perform the song live after going solo. He also included his version of the song on his 2025 album, The Invisible Bluesman.
