= The Herd (British band) =

English rock band

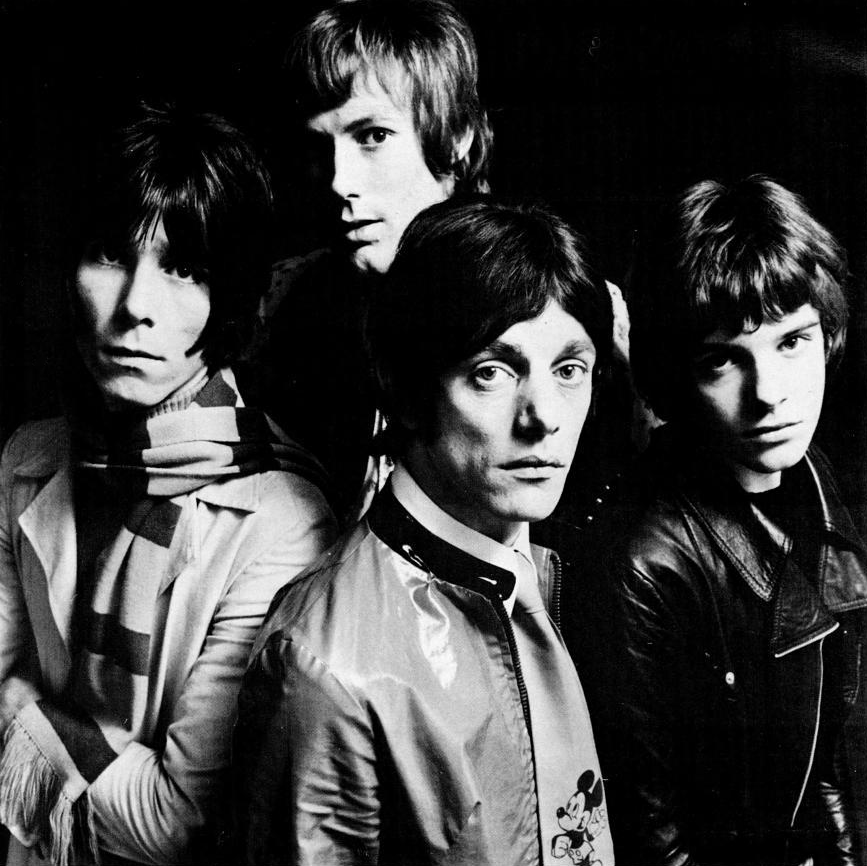
- The Herd in 1968. Clockwise from top: Gary Taylor (bass), Peter Frampton (guitar, vocals), Andrew Steele (drums), Andy Bown (keyboards, vocals)

Background information
- Origin: London, England
- Genres: Freakbeat, psychedelic rock, psychedelic pop
- Years active: 1965–1969, 1971
- Past members: Peter Frampton; Andy Bown; Tony Chapman; Mick Underwood; Andrew Steele; Terry Clarke; Gary Taylor; Louis Cennamo; Henry Spinetti

The Herd were an English rock band, founded in 1965. In 1966, 16-year-old Peter Frampton joined as lead singer and guitarist. The band had three UK top twenty hits in the late 1960s, including "From the Underworld" and "I Don't Want Our Loving to Die", before Frampton left in 1968 to form Humble Pie with Steve Marriott. The band broke up shortly after, reforming briefly and unsuccessfully in 1971.

== Biography ==
The Herd were founded in 1965 in south London, and recorded three unsuccessful singles with Parlophone. The original line-up was Terry Clarke (vocals and guitar), Gary Taylor (guitar), Louis Cennamo (bass), and Tony Chapman (drums). In 1966, all but Taylor quit the group. With new members Peter Frampton (vocals and guitar), Andy Bown (keyboards), and Andrew Steele (drums), the group got the line-up that made it famous. Singer and guitarist Peter Frampton was 16 when he joined the group in 1966 and had just left school. The other members were a few years older. Parlophone did not want to go on with them, but Fontana were willing to give them a try. They also sent their manager Billy Gaff away and brought in the songwriters/producers Ken Howard and Alan Blaikley instead. This pair had been largely responsible for a string of hits by Dave Dee, Dozy, Beaky, Mick & Tich.

Howard and Blaikley orchestrated for them a unique blend of pop and flower power. After a UK singles chart near-miss with "I Can Fly" (April 1967), the haunting "From the Underworld", (August 1967) based on the legend of Orpheus and Eurydice, reached number six later that year with help from copious plays on pirate radio. It was a hit in other countries too. In the Netherlands the song reached number three. "From the Underworld" was followed by "Paradise Lost", (November 1967) which made it up to number 15. In October 1967 they supported the Jimi Hendrix Experience at The Saville Theatre, London. Their greatest success came with "I Don't Want Our Loving to Die", (March 1968) a number five UK hit single.

With his boyish photogenic looks, Frampton was dubbed "The Face of '68" by teen magazine Rave.

The last months of 1968 were tempestuous times for the group. Steele left the group, to be replaced by Henry Spinetti. The group dumped their managers Howard and Blaikley, and briefly found a new mentor in Harvey Lisberg who after three months found himself so bogged down with their personnel problems that he politely withdrew his services. Most songs on their first and only album Paradise Lost were written by Peter Frampton and Andy Bown, just like their next single, "Sunshine Cottage".

Dissatisfied with mere teen idol status, and disappointed with the failure of "Sunshine Cottage", Frampton left by the end of 1968 to form Humble Pie with Steve Marriott. The remaining members Bown, Spinetti and Taylor made another flop single, "The Game", then, minus Taylor, formed the short-lived Judas Jump with Allan Jones, saxophonist from Amen Corner, and Welsh vocalist Adrian Williams. Taylor, who became a disc jockey, and Steele, reunited briefly for a one-off single "You've Got Me Hangin' From Your Lovin' Tree" in June 1971, to almost universal lack of interest. By the late 1970s Bown had become a member of UK rockers Status Quo and both Taylor and Spinetti joined up with Gerry Rafferty.

Andrew Steele died of cancer in Alaska on 18 April 2005, aged 63.

== Band members ==
- Louis Cennamo (1965–1966) – bass
- Terry Clarke (1965–1966) – vocals, guitar, from Roehampton, now living in Western Australia
- Tony Chapman (1965–1966) – drums
- Mick Underwood (1966) – drums
- Andy Bown (1965–1969) – keyboards, vocals, bass
- Gary Taylor (1965–1969, 1971) – born Graham John Taylor, 28 November 1947, Walton-on-Thames, Surrey – bass, vocals, guitar
- Peter Frampton (1966–1968) – guitar, vocals
- Andrew Steele (1966–1968, 1971) – born Andrew Roy Malcolm Steele, 2 August 1941, Hendon, north-west London – died 18 April 2005, Alaska, U.S. – drums, vocals
- Henry Spinetti (replaced Steele in 1968–1969) – drums

== Discography ==
=== Singles ===
Year	Title	Details	Peak chart positions						
Year	Title	Details	AUS	BEL (WA)	GER	IRE	NL	NZ	UK
1965	"Goodbye Baby (Baby Goodbye)"	Released: 28 May 1965; B-side: "Here Comes the Fool"; Label: Parlophone R5284	—	—	—	—	—	—	—
1965	"She Was Really Saying Something"	Released: October 1965; B-side: "It's Been a Long Time Baby"; Label: Parlophone R5353	—	—	—	—	—	—	—
1966	"So Much in Love"	Released: 18 February 1966; B-side: "This Boy's Always Been True"; Label: Parlophone R5413	—	—	—	—	—	—	—
1967	"I Can Fly"	Released: April 1967; B-side: "Diary of a Narcissist"; Label: Fontana TF819; B-side: "Understand Me" (US)	—	—	—	—	—	—	—
1967	"From the Underworld"	Released: August 1967; B-side: "Sweet William"; Label: Fontana TF856	88	49	11	14	2	—	6
1967	"Paradise Lost"	Released: December 1967; B-side: "Come on, Believe Me"; Label: Fontana TF887	—	—	22	—	13	18	15
1968	"I Don't Want Our Loving to Die"	Released: 29 March 1968; B-side: "Our Fairy Tale"; Label: Fontana TF925	65	—	33	5	—	4	5
1968	"Sunshine Cottage"	Released: October 1968; B-side: "Miss Jones"; Label: Fontana TF957	—	—	—	—	—	—	54 (Note: Chart position is from the official UK "Breakers List".)
1969	"The Game"	Released: May 1969; B-side: "Beauty Queen"; Label: Fontana TF1011	—	—	—	—	—	—	—
1971	"You've Got Me Hangin' from Your Lovin' Tree"	Released: June 1971; B-side: "I Don't Wanna Go to Sleep Again"; Label: B&C CB154	—	—	—	—	—	—	—
"—" denotes releases that did not chart or were not released

=== LPs ===
- 1968: Paradise Lost (Fontana STL 5458; entitled Paradise and Underworld in Germany):
  - "From the Underworld" / "On My Way Home" / "I Can Fly" / "Goodbye Groovy" / "Mixed Up Minds"/ "Impressions of Oliver" / "Paradise Lost" / "Sad" / "Something Strange" / "On Your Own" / "She Loves Me, She Loves Me Not" / "Fare Thee Well"
- 1968: Lookin' Thru You (Fontana 67579; only released in the US)
  - "I Don't Want Our Loving to Die" / "Come On, Believe Me" / "Our Fairy Tale" / "On My Way Home" / "Goodbye Groovy" / "From the Underworld" / "Paradise Lost" / "Sweet William" / "I Can Fly" / "Understand Me"
- 1972 From the Underworld (Emidisc 1C048-51106):
  - "From the Underworld" / "Mixed Up Minds" / "Sunshine Cottage" / "Diary of a Narcissist" / "Goodbye Groovy" / "Sad" / "Paradise Lost" / "Beauty Queen" / "Something Strange" / "Sweet William" / "I Can Fly" / "On Your Own"
- 1977: All About The Herd (Philips RJ7292):
  - "From the Underworld" / "On My Way Home" / "I Can Fly" / "Goodbye Groovy" / "Mixed Up Minds" / "Impressions of Oliver" / "Miss Jones" / "I Don't Want Our Loving to Die" / "Sunshine Cottage" / "Paradise Lost" / "Sad" / "Something Strange" / "On Your Own" / "She Loves Me, She Loves Me Not" / "Fare Thee Well"
- 1999: The Fontana Years (Lilith Records 900525; double album on vinyl, produced in the Netherlands):
  - "From the Underworld" / "Paradise Lost" / "I Don't Want Our Loving to Die" / "Bang!" / "Beauty Queen" / "Charlie Anderson" / "Come on, Believe Me" / "Diary of a Narcissist" / "Fare Thee Well" / "Follow the Leader" / "Goodbye Groovy" / "Half of Me" / "You've Got Me Hangin' from Your Lovin' Tree" / "I Can Fly" / "I Don't Wanna Go to Sleep Again" / "Impressions of Oliver" / "Laugh and Dance and Sing" / "Miss Jones" / "Mixed Up Minds" / "Mother's Blue Eyed Angel" / "On My Way Home" / "On Your Own" / "Our Fairy Tale" / "Sad" / "Good Citizen" / "She Loves Me, She Loves Me Not" / "Something Strange" / "Sugarloaf Mountain" / "Sunshine Cottage" / "Sweet William" / "The Game" / "Understand Me"

=== CDs ===
- 1989: Paradise Lost (Fontana 842760-2):
  - "From the Underworld" / "On My Way Home" / "I Can Fly" / "Goodbye Groovy" / "Mixed Up Minds" / "Impressions of Oliver" / "Paradise Lost" / "Sad" / "Something Strange" / "On Your Own" / "She Loves Me, She Loves Me Not" / "Fare Thee Well" / "Sweet William" / "Come on, Believe Me" / "I Don’t Want Our Loving To Die" / "Our Fairy Tale"
- 1994: The Herd Featuring Peter Frampton (Polygram 522746):
  - "From the Underworld" / "On My Way Home" / "I Can Fly" / "Goodbye Groovy" / "Mixed Up Minds" / "Impressions of Oliver" / "Paradise Lost" / "Sad" / "Something Strange" / "On Your Own" / "She Loves Me, She Loves Me Not" / "Fare Thee Well" / "Diary of a Narcissist" / "Understand Me" / "Sweet William" / "Come on, Believe Me" / "I Don't Want Our Loving to Die" / "Our Fairy Tale" / "Sunshine Cottage" / "Miss Jones"
- 1995: From the Underworld: The Singles and More (BR Music BX 451-2):
  - "From the Underground" / "Paradise Lost" / "I Don't Want Our Loving to Die" / "I Can Fly" / "Diary of a Narcissist" / "Our Fairy Tale" / "Sunshine Cottage" / "The Game" / "Come on, Believe Me" / "Miss Jones" / "Follow the Leader" / "Mother's Blue Eyed Angel" / "On My Way Home" / "Mixed Up Minds" / "Something Strange" / "Sad" / "You’ve Got Me Hangin' From Your Lovin' Tree" / "Fare Thee Well" / "Half of Me" / "I Don’t Wanna Go to Sleep Again" / "Laugh and Dance and Sing" / "She Loves Me, She Loves Me Not" / "Sweet William" / "Sugar Loaf Mountain" / "Understand Me" / "Bang!" / "Charlie Anderson" / "Beauty Queen"
- 1998: I Can Fly: The Very Best of The Herd (Collectables Records 5890):
  - "I Can Fly" / "I Don't Want Our Loving to Die" / "Come on, Believe Me" / "Our Fairy Tale" / "From the Underworld" / "Paradise Lost" / "Sweet William" / "Understand Me" / "Beauty Queen" / "The Game" / "Miss Jones" / "Diary of a Narcissist" / "I Don't Wanna Go to Sleep Again" / "You've Got Me Hangin' from Your Lovin' Tree" / "Something Strange" / "Mixed Up Minds" / "Sad" / "Goodbye Groovy"
- 1998: Anthology (MCI Music MCCD352):
  - "I Can Fly" / "Diary of a Narcissist" / "From the Underworld" / "Sweet William" / "Paradise Lost" / "Come on, Believe Me" / "Mixed Up Minds" / "Sad" / "Fare Thee Well" / "I Don't Want Our Loving to Die" / "Our Fairy Tale" / "On My Way Home" / "Sunshine Cottage" / "Miss Jones" / "She Loves Me, She Loves Me Not" / "Something Strange" / "The Game" / "Beauty Queen" / "You've Got Me Hangin' from Your Lovin' Tree" / "I Don't Wanna Go to Sleep Again" / "Follow the Leader" / "Mother's Blue Eyed Angel" / "Laugh and Dance and Sing" / "Sugar Loaf Mountain" / "Understand Me" / "Charlie Andersen" / "Bang!"
- 2000: Paradise and Underworld (Repertoire REP 4257):
  - "From the Underworld" / "Paradise Lost" / "I Can Fly" / "I Don't Want Our Loving to Die" / "Sunshine Cottage" / "The Game" / "Sweet William" / "Come on, Believe Me" / "Diary of a Narcissist" / "Understand Me" / "Our Fairy Tale" / "Miss Jones" / "Beauty Queen" / "Follow the Leader" / "Charlie Anderson" / "Bang!" / "Mother's Blue Eyed Angel" / "On My Way Home" / "Goodbye Groovy" / "Mixed Up Minds" / "Impressions of Oliver" / "Sad" / "Something Strange" / "On Your Own" / "She Loves Me, She Loves Me Not" / "Fare Thee Well"
- 2002: Underworld (Snapper 439; double album):
  - "From the Underworld" / "Paradise Lost" / "I Don't Want Our Loving to Die" / "Bang!" / "Beauty Queen" / "Charlie Anderson" / "Come on, Believe Me" / "Diary of a Narcissist" / "Fare Thee Well" / "Follow the Leader" / "Goodbye Groovy" / "Half of Me" / "You've Got Me Hangin' from Your Lovin' Tree" / "I Can Fly" / "I Dont Wanna Go to Sleep Again" / "Impressions of Oliver" / "Laugh and Dance and Sing" / "Miss Jones" / "Mixed Up Minds" / "Mother's Blue Eyed Angel" / "On My Way Home" / "On Your Own" / "Our Fairy Tale" / "Sad" / "Shame Shame" / "She Loves Me, She Loves Me Not" / "Something Strange" / "Sugarloaf Mountain" / "Sunshine Cottage" / "Sweet William" / "The Game" / "Understand Me"
- 2005: The Complete Herd: Singles As and Bs (Repertoire REP 5032; double album):
  - "I Can Fly" / "Diary of a Narcissist" / "From the Underworld" / "Sweet William" / "Paradise Lost" / "Come on, Believe Me" / "I Don't Want Our Loving to Die" / "Our Fairy Tale" / "Sunshine Cottage" / "Miss Jones" / "The Game" / "Beauty Queen" / "You've Got Me Hangin' from Your Lovin' Tree" / "I Don't Wanna Go to Sleep Again" / "Understand Me" / "Follow the Leader" / "Charlie Anderson" / "Bang!" / "Mother's Blue Eyed Angel" / "Laugh and Dance and Sing" / "Sugarloaf Mountain" / "Half of Me" / "Sweet William" / "I Don't Want Our Loving to Die" / "The Game" / "From the Underworld" / "On My Way Home" / "I Can Fly" / "Goodbye Groovy" / "Mixed Up Minds" / "Impressions of Oliver" / "Paradise Lost" / "Sad" / "Something Strange" / "On My Own" / "She Loves Me, She Loves Me Not" / "Fare Thee Well" / "Come on, Believe Me" / "Our Fairy Tale" / "You've Got Me Hangin' from Your Lovin' Tree" / "I Don't Wanna Go to Sleep Again" / "Goodbye Baby Goodbye" / "Here Comes the Fool" / "She Was Really Saying Something" / "It's Been a Long Time Baby" / "So Much in Love" / "This Boy's Always Been True"
- 2006: Best of the Herd (Repertoire REP 5031):
  - "From the Underworld" / "Paradise Lost" / "I Can Fly" / "I Don't Want Our Loving to Die" / "Miss Jones" / "The Game" / "Sunshine Cottage" / "Sweet William" / "Come on, Believe Me" / "Diary of a Narcissist" / "Understand Me" / "Our Fairy Tale" / "Beauty Queen" / "You've Got Me Hangin' from Your Lovin' Tree" / "I Don't Wanna Go to Sleep Again" / "Follow the Leader" / "Charlie Anderson" / "Bang!" / "Mother's Blue Eyed Angel" / "On My Way Home" / "Goodbye Groovy" / "Mixed Up Minds" / "Impressions of Oliver" / "Something Strange" / "On Your Own" / "Fare Thee Well"
