= The Invisible Bluesman =

Studio album by Andy Fairweather Low
- Released: 7 February 2025
- Genre: Blues
- Length: 46:02
- Label: The Last Music Company
- Producer: Glyn Johns

Andy Fairweather Low chronology
Flang Dang (2023)	The Invisible Bluesman (2025)

The Invisible Bluesman is a studio album by Welsh musician Andy Fairweather Low. It was released on 7 February 2025, through The Last Music Company.

The album includes cover versions of songs by artists such as Junior Parker, Jimmy Reed and Muddy Waters.

== Critical reception ==
Professional ratings
Aggregate scores
Source	Rating
Metacritic	81/100
Review scores
Source	Rating

The Invisible Bluesman was met with "universal acclaim" reviews from critics. At Metacritic, which assigns a weighted average rating out of 100 to reviews from mainstream publications, this release received an average score of 81, based on 4 reviews.

== Track listing ==
The Invisible Bluesman
No.	Title	Writer(s)	Length
1.	"My Baby Left Me"	Arthur Crudup	2:33
2.	"Rollin' and Tumblin'"	Traditional	2:46
3.	"Got Love If You Want It"	Slim Harpo	2:49
4.	"Gin House Blues"	Harry Burke	5:13
5.	"Baby What You Want Me to Do"	Jimmy Reed	3:25
6.	"When Things Go Wrong"	Unknown	2:35
7.	"Matchbox"	Carl Perkins	1:35
8.	"Mystery Train"	Junior Parker	4:10
9.	"So Glad You're Mine"	Arthur Crudup	5:00
10.	"Bright Lights, Big City"	Jimmy Reed	6:19
11.	"Lightnin's Boogie"	Lightnin' Hopkins	2:16
12.	"Life Is Good"	Unknown	2:48
13.	"Gin House Blues (radio edit)"	Harry Burke	4:32

== Charts ==
Chart performance for The Invisible Bluesman
Chart (2025)	Peak position
Scottish Albums (OCC)	55
UK Independent Albums (OCC)	19
UK Jazz & Blues Albums (OCC)	1
