= Be Bop 'n' Holla =

Studio album by Andy Fairweather Low
- Released: 1976
- Genre: Pop rock, light rock
- Label: A&M
- Producer: Glyn Johns

Andy Fairweather Low chronology
| La Booga Rooga (1975) | Be Bop 'n' Holla (1976) | Mega Shebang (1980) |

Be Bop 'n' Holla is the third solo album by the Welsh musician Andy Fairweather Low, released in 1976. Low supported it with a UK tour. Be Bop 'n' Holla was his final album for A&M Records; Low felt that A&M's signing of the Sex Pistols changed the music industry and marginalized his place in it.

== Production ==
The album was produced and engineered by Glyn Johns. B. J. Cole contributed on pedal steel. Georgie Fame played piano on "Rhythm 'n' Jazz". "Rocky Raccoon" is a cover of the Paul McCartney song. "Travellin' Light" was written by Cliff Richard. The lyrics of "Hot Poop" are a recitation of its chord changes.

== Critical reception ==
Professional ratings
Review scores
| Source | Rating |
|---|---|
| AllMusic | 2/5 stars |
| Robert Christgau | A |
| The Clydebank Press | 3/5 |
| The Encyclopedia of Popular Music | 2/5 stars |
| Norwich Mercury | 5/5 stars |
| Rolling Stone | 3/5 stars |

The Clydebank Press called Low "one of the most underrated in the business." The Burton Daily Mail deemed the album "a sort of semi-funky sometimes dreamy beat with Andy's very distinctive vocals." Rolling Stone praised the "light rock-pop" and Low's "kinky sense of humor". The Norwich Mercury admired the "magnificent finale" of the title track.

The San Francisco Chronicle stated that Low "is a gentle musical prankster, whose light but likeable tunes are wrapped in shimmering sounds". Robert Christgau wrote that Be Bop 'n' Holla is "a tuneful, sexy album, and oh so frivolous—'Lighten Up' sounds like a theme song." The Daily Herald-Telephone opined that it "sort of sounds like the ghost of Paul McCartney visiting the remnants of NRBQ."

== Track listing ==
Side one

1. "Shimmie-Doo-Wah-Sae"
2. "Ain't No Fun Anymore"
3. "Da Doo Rendezvous"
4. "Hot Poop"
5. "Travellin' Light"
6. "Rocky Raccoon"

Side two

1. "Lighten Up"
2. "I Can't Take Much More"
3. "Rhythm 'n' Jazz"
4. "Checking Out the Checker"
5. "Be Bop 'n' Holla"
