= Tony Chapman =

British musician

- Born: Anthony Michael Chapman; 19 May 1941 (age 84); Stoke Newington, London, England
- Instrument: Drums
- Years active: 1960–1966
- Formerly of: The Rolling Stones; The Cliftons; The Preachers; The Herd

Anthony Michael Chapman (born 19 May 1941 in Stoke Newington, London) is a British drummer and songwriter who was especially active during the 1960s.

== Career ==
=== The Rolling Stones ===
Chapman gained valuable drumming experience as part of the Cliftons in 1960, a band headed by Bill Wyman. He also jammed with an early line-up of the Rolling Stones before they settled on their permanent band members. He appeared with the band in 1962, including a performance at Sidcup Art College, Bexley, which Keith Richards had attended. Chapman is among several drummers proposed to have possibly been the one to play with the band at their first official performance of on 12 July 1962 at the Marquee Club in London. Chapman himself has denied that he played the gig. He was the drummer for their first studio sessions on 27 October 1962, when the band recorded covers of the songs "You Can't Judge a Book by the Cover", "Soon Forgotten", and "Close Together". An acetate disc of the recordings once owned by Chapman was sold to a private collector in 1988 at auction. Chapman was often unavailable for rehearsals and gigs as he was a salesman, so the band brought in Steve Harris as a replacement on occasion.

Chapman was the person through whom Wyman was enlisted to the Stones. It was Chapman who made inquiries about vacancies with the Stones and discovered they might be found at the Wetherby Arms on the King's Road, Chelsea. He and Wyman turned up for a run-through and although they had doubts about the blues style and did not like the name, agreed to join. Another drummer, Steve Harris, also sat in for some sessions. Chapman felt that he did not fit in with the way-out approach of the group for the time and left to play drums for the Alphabeats before leaving to form a band called The Preachers. Wyman remained with the Rolling Stones, when Charlie Watts took over as their permanent drummer.

=== Later career ===
Chapman's group, the Preachers had a less wild approach and he wrote one side of their only single "Too Old in the Head" the flip side of "Hole in the Soul." The Preachers was one of the first bands that 14 year old Peter Frampton appeared in and was being produced and managed by Bill Wyman. Chapman was responsible for the first meeting between Wyman and Frampton in 1964. The Preachers disbanded for a time following a fatal van crash on 4 June 1964, Chapman temporarily lost his memory and had no recollection of the collision, when the vehicle left the road and hit a telegraph pole. Chapman (joined Peter Frampton) and tried out for the drums in The Herd but he was eased out as a member in 1965, when they recruited Andrew Steele, Andy Bown (later of Status Quo) and others.

Chapman reformed the Preachers in June 1965, with Peter Frampton, Pete Atwood, Ken Leaman, Alex Brown and Peter Gosling, releasing a single on Columbia soon after (1965) produced by Bill Wyman, Chapman wrote the B side, Too Old in the Head. They opened for the Rolling Stones on ITV's Ready Steady Go! on 2 September 1965 and regularly performed on the circuit, until Chapman was dismissed and replaced by Malcolm Penn, leading to the band changing their name to Moon's Train.

== Personal life ==
Chapman stepped away from the music business and moved to Palm Springs, Florida in the United States soon after. He built up a fine art business, which he sold in 2011, when he retired, he moved to Portugal to play golf.
