= La Booga Rooga =

Studio album by Andy Fairweather Low
- Released: 1975
- Genre: Pop rock
- Length: 37:19
- Label: A&M
- Producer: Glyn Johns

Andy Fairweather Low chronology
Spider Jiving (1974)	La Booga Rooga (1975)	Be Bop 'n' Holla (1976)

Professional ratings
Review scores
Source	Rating
AllMusic	4.5/5 stars
Christgau's Record Guide	A−
Rate Your Music	3.4/5 stars

La Booga Rooga was the second solo album by Andy Fairweather Low, and was released by A&M Records in 1975.

It was Fairweather Low's most successful album, with an eclectic musical styling. The opening track was a cover of Clarence Williams' 1933 penned track "My Bucket's Got a Hole in It", which incorporated steel guitar playing by B. J. Cole. Another offering, "Champagne Melody", was styled as lounge music, whilst the album's funk-driven title track became a minor UK hit in March 1976, when covered by an Australian female vocal group, The Surprise Sisters.

The album also contained Fairweather Low's biggest selling single, "Wide Eyed and Legless", which reached No. 6 in the UK Singles Chart at Christmas time in 1975. However, his earlier single release of "La Booga Rooga" in September that year, failed to chart. Leo Sayer covered "La Booga Rooga" on his 1978 album, Leo Sayer.

== Track listing ==
All tracks composed by Andy Fairweather Low, except where noted.

Side 1

1. "My Bucket's Got a Hole in It" (Clarence Williams) – 3:11
2. "Jump Up and Turn Around" – 4:02
3. "Halfway to Everything" – 4:04
4. "La Booga Rooga" – 4:11
5. "Champagne Melody" – 3:03

Side 2

1. "If That's What It Takes" – 3:29
2. "8 Ton Crazy" – 3:29
3. "Grease It Up" – 3:10
4. "Wide Eyed and Legless" – 4:00
5. "Inner City Highwayman" – 4:40

== Personnel ==
- Andrew Fairweather Low - acoustic and electric guitar, vocals
- Bud Beadle – baritone saxophone
- John "Rabbit" Bundrick – piano, electric piano, organ, Clavinet
- Doreen Chanter – backing vocals
- Irene Chanter – backing vocals
- B. J. Cole – pedal steel guitar, dobro
- John David – bass guitar, backing vocals
- Joe Egan – backing vocals
- Georgie Fame – piano, organ, brass arrangements
- Benny Gallagher – high-strung guitar, vocals, accordion
- Steve Gregory – alto saxophone, brass arrangements
- Jimmy Jewell – tenor saxophone
- Glyn Johns – cabasa, engineering, production
- Kenney Jones – drums, percussion
- Bernie Leadon – acoustic guitar, banjo
- Graham Lyle – 12-string guitar, electric rhythm guitar, backing vocals
- Dave Mattacks – drums
- Gerry Rafferty – backing vocals
- Brian Rogers – string arrangements
- Bruce Rowland – drums
- Barry St. John – backing vocals
- Liza Strike – backing vocals
- Eddie "Tan Tan" Thornton – trumpet
- Joanne Williams – backing vocals

Technical

- Fabio Nicoli - art direction
- Nick Marshall - design
- Gered Mankowitz - photography

== Later issues ==
In 2006, the album was released on CD.
