= Unfinished Business (2009 film) =

- Release date: 2009
- Country: South Africa

Unfinished Business is a 2009 South African mockumentary about constructing a peak on a table top mountain.

== Production ==
A mobile film crew was able to film mockumentary-style interviews with residents and tourists discussing the possibility of a peak and their views. The film also documents how a peak on a table top mountain would affect extreme sports.

CGI software rendered 8 million points of data to give the mountain multiple characteristics required for skydiving and other extreme sports.

== Screenings and Reception ==
Unfinished Business has been screened at a number of festivals in the UK, Canada, South Africa and Poland including the Tampere festival, Rossland Mountain Film Festival, Llanberis Mountain Film Festival, Valentines Film Festival and Vancouver Film Festival.
