= Amen Corner (band) =

Welsh rock band

Background information
- Origin: Cardiff, Wales
- Genres: Psychedelic rock; pop rock
- Years active: 1966–1969
- Labels: Deram; Immediate
- Spinoffs: Fair Weather
- Past members: Andy Fairweather Low; Neil Jones; Marius Jones; Blue Weaver; Mike Smith; Clive Taylor; Dennis Bryon

Amen Corner were a Welsh rock group formed in Cardiff. They are best known for their hits "Bend Me, Shape Me" (1968), "High in the Sky" (1968) and the chart-topper "(If Paradise Is) Half as Nice" (1969).

== Career ==
The band, formed in late 1966, was named after The Amen Corner, a weekly disc spin at the Victoria Ballroom (later to become The Scene Club) in Cardiff, Wales, where every Sunday night Dr. Rock would play soul music from the United States.

Initially they specialised in a blues and jazz-oriented style, but were steered by their record labels towards a more commercial sound. Their first hit was a rendition of "Gin House Blues". Their first singles and album appeared on Decca's subsidiary label, Deram, but they left at the end of 1968 to join Immediate, for which they had a No. 1, "(If Paradise Is) Half as Nice" in early 1969, followed by another Top 5 entry with the Roy Wood composition, "Hello Susie".

After recording a final studio album, Farewell to the Real Magnificent Seven, they put out a single with a cover version of the Beatles' "Get Back" as their swansong. They disbanded by the end of 1969. The band also appeared as themselves in the 1969 horror film, Scream and Scream Again, singing the film's eponymous theme song.

Whilst saxophone player Allan Jones went on to form Judas Jump, guitarist and vocalist Andy Fairweather Low led Dennis Bryon (drums), Blue Weaver (organ), Clive Taylor (bass) and Neil Jones (guitar) into a new band, Fair Weather. The band scored a UK No. 6 hit with "Natural Sinner" in 1970 and recorded one album before disbanding after Weaver left to join The Strawbs a year later.

Fairweather Low went on to a successful solo career in the 1970s, notably with the Top 10 hit "Wide Eyed and Legless" (1975); he became a regular player with Eric Clapton, George Harrison and Roger Waters. Weaver joined The Strawbs as Rick Wakeman's replacement and after a successful 1974 tour with Mott the Hoople, went on to join the Bee Gees, where Dennis Bryon was now the drummer. Weaver also played keyboards for many artists as a session player and later Fairlight programmer.

Saxophonist player Allan Jones went on to manage L.A. Guns from 1986 to 1991.

Amen Corner's Decca back catalogue has been re-issued as part of the "Collection" series, and their Immediate work (including their singles, live album and material recorded for an unreleased studio album) has been released on If Paradise Was Half as Nice: The Immediate Anthology.

== Band members ==
- Andy Fairweather Low (born Andrew Fairweather Low, 2 August 1948, Ystrad Mynach, Hengoed, South Wales) – vocals
- Neil Jones (born 25 March 1948, Llanbradach, South Wales; died 8 June 2018) – guitar
- Allan Jones (born 6 February 1947, Swansea, Glamorgan, South Wales) – saxophone
- Blue Weaver (born Derek John Weaver, 11 March 1947, Cardiff, Glamorgan, South Wales) – keyboards
- Mike Smith (born Michael Joseph Smith, 4 November 1947, Neath, South Wales) – tenor saxophone
- Clive Taylor (born 27 April 1948, Cardiff) – bass, backing vocals
- Dennis Bryon (born Dennis Ronald Bryon, 14 April 1949, Cardiff, died 14 November 2024) – drums, backing vocals

== Discography ==
=== Albums ===
- Round Amen Corner (Deram, 1968) – UK No. 26
- The National Welsh Coast Live Explosion Company (Immediate, 1969) – UK No. 19
- Farewell to the Real Magnificent Seven (Immediate, 1969)
- The Return of the Magnificent Seven (Immediate, 1976)
- Greatest Hits (Immediate, 1977)
- If Paradise Is Half As Nice: The Immediate Anthology (Castle, 2000)
- Amen Corner (If Paradise Is Half As Nice and More Hits) (Weton-Wesgram, 2007) – includes live recordings

=== Singles ===
Year	Single	Peak chart positions								
Year	Single	UK	AUS	AUT	BE (WA)	GER	IRE	NL	NOR	NZ
1967	"Gin House Blues"	12	85	—	—	—	—	12	—	—
1967	"The World of Broken Hearts"	24	—	—	—	—	—	—	—	—
1968	"Bend Me, Shape Me"	3	—	—	16	—	5	—	10	9
1968	"High in the Sky"	6	—	—	—	—	9	—	—	19
1969	"(If Paradise Is) Half as Nice"	1	82	14	27	12	4	15	7	5
1969	"Let the Good Times Roll and Feel So Good" (withdrawn from UK release)	—	—	—	—	—	—	—	—	—
1969	"At Last I've Found Someone to Love" (New Zealand-only release)	—	—	—	—	—	—	—	—	—
1969	"Hello Susie"	4	—	14	—	14	7	13	—	13
1969	"Judge Rumpel Crassila" (Netherlands-only release)	—	—	—	—	—	—	—	—	—
1969	"So Fine" (promo sampler)	—	—	—	—	—	—	—	—	—
1969	"Get Back"	—	—	—	—	—	—	—	—	—
1976	"(If Paradise Is) Half as Nice" (re-release)	34	—	—	—	—	—	—	—	—
"—" denotes releases that did not chart or were not released

== See also ==
- List of artists who reached number one on the UK Singles Chart
- List of performers on Top of the Pops
- List of UK Singles Chart number ones of the 1960s
