= Wide Eyed and Legless =

Single by Andy Fairweather Low

from the album La Booga Rooga
- B-side: "Grease It Up"
- Released: November 1975
- Genre: Pop rock
- Length: 4:00
- Label: A&M Records AMS 7202
- Songwriter: Andy Fairweather Low
- Producer: Glyn Johns

Andy Fairweather Low singles chronology
"La Booga Rooga" (1975)	"Wide Eyed and Legless" (1975)	"Champagne Melody" (1975)

"Wide Eyed and Legless" is a song written and performed by Andy Fairweather Low in 1975. The track peaked at No. 6 in the UK Singles Chart in December that year. The track also peaked at No. 4 in the Irish Singles Chart early the following year. It had originally been published on Fairweather Low's album, La Booga Rooga, which was released earlier the same year. The track was produced by Glyn Johns.

In Australia, the track was issued with "Halfway to Everything" (another track from La Booga Rooga) on the B-side.

Wide Eyed and Legless: 1970-1997 was the title of a compilation album issued by Fairweather Low in 2004.

== Personnel ==
- Andy Fairweather Low – vocals, high-string guitar
- Bernie Leadon – acoustic guitar
- B. J. Cole – pedal steel guitar (phased)
- John Bundrick - electric piano (phased)
- John David – bass guitar
- Bruce Rowland – drums
- Brian Rogers – string arrangement
- Glyn Johns – cabasa, engineering and production

The track was a 1975 copyright to Rondor Music London Ltd
