= From the Underworld =

- US fold-out sleeve

Single by The Herd

from the album Paradise Lost
- B-side: "Sweet William"
- Released: 11 August 1967
- Genre: Psychedelic pop
- Length: 3:15
- Label: Fontana
- Songwriter(s): Ken Howard; Alan Blaikley
- Producer(s): Steve Rowland

The Herd singles chronology
"I Can Fly" (1967)	"From the Underworld" (1967)	"Paradise Lost" (1967)

"From the Underworld" is a single by the English rock band the Herd, released in August 1967. Written by the band's managers Ken Howard and Alan Blaikley, the song's lyrics are based on the ancient Greek myth of Orpheus and Eurydice. It became the band's first hit upon release, reaching number 6 on the UK Singles Chart and launching singer Peter Frampton as a pop star. It was later included on the group's only studio album Paradise Lost (1968).

== Background and recording ==
The Herd, comprising 16-year-old guitarist Peter Frampton, keyboardist Andy Bown, bassist Gary Taylor and drummer Andrew Steele, signed with Fontana Records in early 1967. The band's live performances were marked by an R&B sound, with Frampton, Bown and Taylor all taking lead vocals. However, the band's managers Ken Howard and Alan Blaikley, known for their success with Dave Dee, Dozy, Beaky, Mick & Tich, positioned Frampton as the frontman. Frampton sang lead on the Herd's first Fontana single, "I Can Fly", and later reflected "they didn’t put the Herd on the covers of the magazines, they put me on. And instantly it started discontent in the band. I felt terrible. The die was cast."

Howard and Blaikley wrote "From the Underworld" before they became involved with the Herd. The partners considered it a more serious work than the hits they wrote for Dave Dee, Dozy, Beaky, Mick & Tich. They compared their approach to that of the English writer Graham Greene, who divided his work into novels and "entertainments"; in a 1967 interview, Howard declared "The Herd are the novels and Dave Dee and co are the entertainments - and that is not meant to be derogatory in any way." Lyrically, "From the Underworld" is based on the ancient Greek legend of the musician and poet Orpheus, who descends to the underworld to rescue his lover Eurydice, only to lose her when he breaks the commandment given to him by Hades and looks behind during their journey back to the living world. Howard and Blaikley had reportedly learnt the story when studying Latin at University College School, Hampstead. Regarding the song's Greek mythology theme, Michael Beale of the Birmingham Mail considered the success of Procol Harum's "A Whiter Shade of Pale" proof "that there is room at the top of the chart for something different".

Musically, the song employs an elaborate string and brass arrangement. A fuzz guitar part and trumpet obligato also feature, with a "demonic chorus" and "a most difficult, galloping rhythm", according to Ray Connolly. It opens with a tolling bell, dubbed "Big Ben, or a near relation" by Peter Jones of Record Mirror.

== Release ==
"From the Underworld", backed with "Sweet William", was released by Fontana on 11 August 1967. The Herd promoted the single with a television appearance on BBC1's Dee Time (7 September) and radio sessions on the Light Programme's Pop North and Swingalong. The band performed the song on the 28 September edition of Top of the Pops. It peaked at number six on the UK Singles Chart in November 1967 and ultimately spent 13 weeks on the chart. Speaking during its chart run, drummer Andrew Steele described 'From the Underworld" as "a fluke" and expressed the band's intention to write their own material.

== Reception and legacy ==
The song received mixed reviews upon release. Writing in the New Musical Express, Derek Johnson considered "From the Underworld" "a remarkable disc", praising it as "beautifully scored" and "the most serious and thoughtful composition yet from the Howard-Blaikley team". Peter Jones of Record Mirror commented "this moody bit of writing... ...is well-conceived but just misses out. Most promising, however." Ray Connolly of the Evening Standard wrote "a good, interesting record with some nice mythical-sounding trumpets, but personally I prefer the way Kathleen Ferrier used to sing about Eurydice." Alan Jones of the Lincolnshire Echo deemed the Greek mythology theme "learned material for pop song lyrics. The end product, however, is not as adventurous as the choice of material." Interviewed for the Melody Maker column "Blind Date", Bruce Johnston of the Beach Boys compared the chants in "From the Underworld" to the Yardbirds' "Still I'm Sad". He praised the percussion ("like African-Tahitian wood blocks") but felt the arrangement too elaborate, commenting "it's like overproducing "London Bridge Is Falling Down."

The song has received retrospective praise. In 1998, Mojo listed "From the Underworld" in its list of "100 Greatest Psychedelic Classics". In his 2017 book Goldmine's Essential Guide to Record Collecting, Dave Thompson defines the song as "pure pop in dark, moody clothing" while Richie Unterberger of AllMusic considers it the highlight of Paradise Lost, highlighting its "dense production and booming harmonies".

Howard and Blaikley used another part of the Orpheus and Eurydice legend – as described in Vergil's Georgics – as inspiration for Dave Dee, Dozy, Beaky, Mick & Tich's 1969 hit "Snake in the Grass"; the song is adapted from a section in which Eurydice dies while Orpheus attempts to rescue her from Hades, following a snake bite which she receives while running from a would-be rapist.

A cover of the song by Marc Almond features on his 2017 album Shadows and Reflections.

== Charts ==
Chart (1967)	Peak position
Belgium (Ultratop 50 Wallonia)	49
Ireland (IRMA)	14
Netherlands (Dutch Top 40)	3
Netherlands (Single Top 100)	2
UK Singles (OCC)	6
West Germany (GfK)	11
