= Judas Jump =

British progressive rock supergroup (1969–1971)

- Origin: United Kingdom
- Genre: Progressive rock
- Years active: 1969–1971
- Label: Parlophone
- Past members: Allan Jones; Andy Bown; Henry Spinetti; Charlie Harrison; Adrian Williams; Trevor Williams

Judas Jump was a British short-lived progressive rock supergroup, formed in 1969. The band released one album and three singles before disbanding in 1971. They are best known for their members who had success before and after Judas Jump.

== Career ==
Judas Jump was established in 1969 as a heavy progressive rock band. They used mellotron, woodwind and brass in their sound, and secured a recording contract with Parlophone. The band included keyboardist Andy Bown, and drummer Henry Spinetti, who had earlier worked with the English rock band the Herd, alongside Peter Frampton. After the Herd dissolved, Bown and Spinetti spent two years with Judas Jump.

Also in their line-up was the former Amen Corner saxophonist, Allan Jones, who played mainly woodwind. The band issued three singles in 1969 and 1970, followed by their only album, Scorch (1970). A United States release on the MGM-distributed Pride Records was oddly delayed until 1972, by which time the group had disbanded. On 14 February 1970, Judas Jump featured on the cover of the British music magazine NME.

Judas Jump were the opening act on 26 August 1970 at the Isle of Wight Festival. On 24 October 1970, Judas Jump played a concert at Polesworth's Memorial Hall. Although they attracted considerable press coverage, their records sold poorly, and did not reach either the UK Singles Chart or UK Albums Chart.

Although Adrian Williams was listed as lead vocalist, Andy Bown is the lead vocalist on almost all tracks. In a mid-1980s interview for a fanzine (The Rock Marketplace), Bown admitted that as leader, primary songwriter, and producer, he decided to replace most of the vocals with his own prior to the album's release.

Bown ultimately joined Status Quo. Fellow band member Charlie Harrison played with the American country rock band Poco, between 1978 and 1984. He also played bass in Roger McGuinn's Thunderbyrd and in the Rick Vito band. Spinetti went on to various session musician work, including playing on Gerry Rafferty's single "Baker Street".

== Lineup ==
- Allan Jones (woodwind) – born 6 February 1947, Swansea, Glamorgan, South Wales
- Andy Bown (keyboards, guitar) – born Andrew Steven Bown, 27 March 1946, Beckenham, London, England
- Henry Spinetti (drums) – born Henry Anthony George Spinetti, 31 March 1951, Cwm, near Ebbw Vale, South Wales
- Charlie Harrison (bass guitar) - born Charles Harrison, 1952, Tamworth, Staffordshire
- Adrian Williams (vocals)
- Trevor Williams (lead guitar)

== Discography ==
=== Albums ===
Year	Title	Label
1970	Scorch	Parlophone

=== Singles ===
Year	Title	Label
1969	"Run For Your Life"	Parlophone
1969	"This Feelin' We Feel"	Parlophone
1970	"Beer Drinking Woman"	Parlophone

== Bibliography ==
- The Tapestry of Delights - The Comprehensive Guide to British Music of the Beat, R&B, Psychedelic and Progressive Eras 1963-1976, Vernon Joynson, ISBN 1-899855-04-1
