= Andy Fairweather Low =

Welsh singer and guitarist (born 1948)

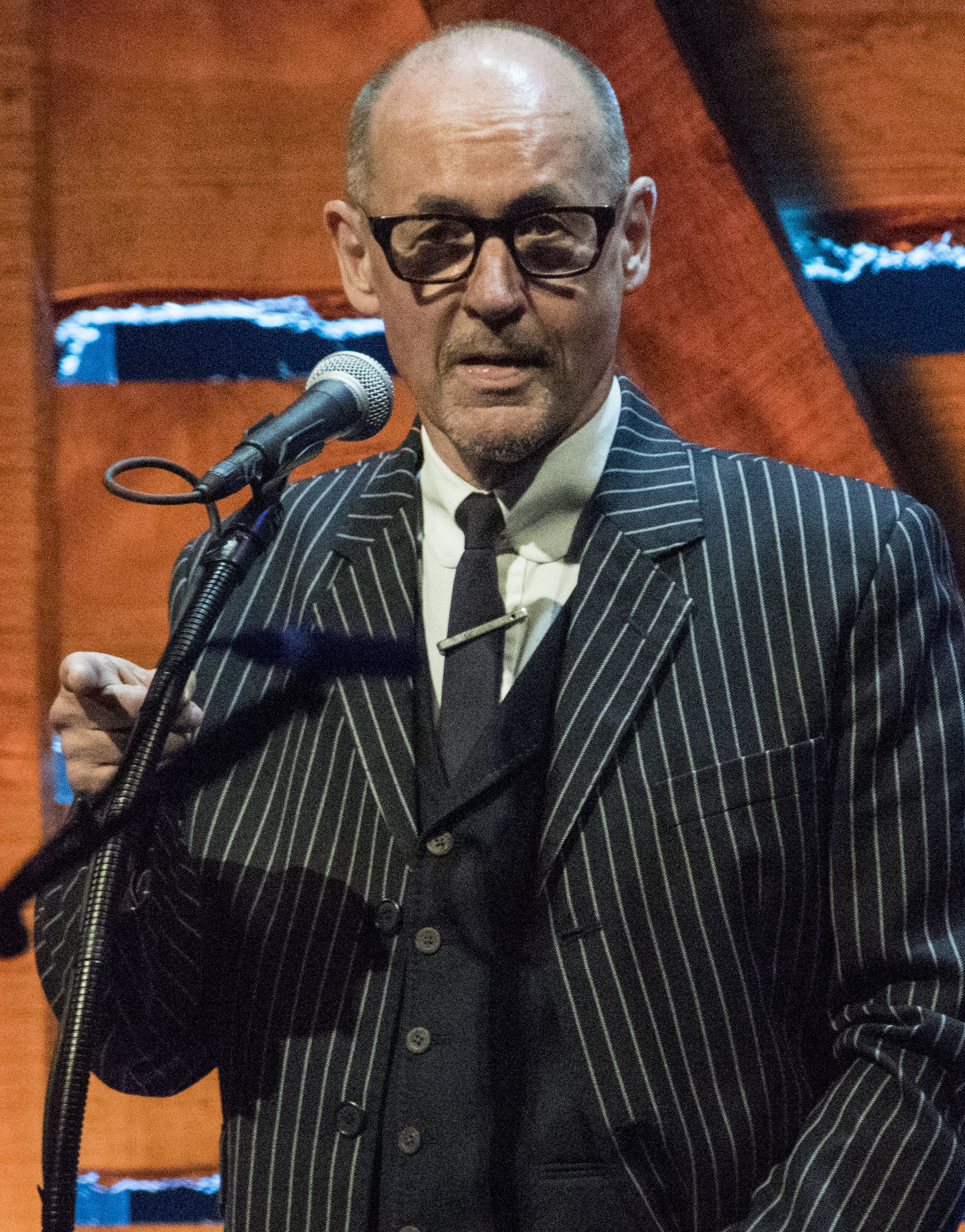
- Fairweather Low at the BBC Radio 2 Folk Awards in 2015

Background information
- Born: Andrew Fairweather Low; 2 August 1948 (age 78); Ystrad Mynach, Wales
- Origin: Cardiff, Wales
- Genres: Rock; pop; blues rock
- Occupations: Musician; songwriter
- Instruments: Guitar; vocals; bass guitar
- Years active: 1966–present
- Label: A&M
- Formerly of: Eric Clapton band; Amen Corner; Fair Weather; Bill Wyman's Rhythm Kings; Roger Waters band
- Website: andyfairweatherlow.com

Andrew Fairweather Low (born 2 August 1948) is a Welsh guitarist and singer. He was a founding member and lead singer of 1960s pop band Amen Corner, and in recent years has toured extensively with Roger Waters, Eric Clapton and Bill Wyman's Rhythm Kings.

== Professional career ==
Fairweather Low was born in Ystrad Mynach, Wales, to working class parents. The family, including his two brothers, lived in an "unheated council house" on an estate; his father, a road sweeper, was unable to afford a car. Fairweather Low's first opportunity to play guitar came when he took a Saturday job at a music shop in Cardiff.

He achieved fame as a founding member of the pop group Amen Corner in the late 1960s. They had four successive top-ten hits on the UK Singles Chart, including the number-one single "(If Paradise Is) Half as Nice" in 1969. In the description of AllMusic critic William Ruhlmann, the band's overnight success and Fairweather Low's teen idol looks "put his attractive face on the bedroom walls of teenage girls all over Britain".

Amen Corner split in two in 1970, with Fairweather Low leading Dennis Bryon (drums), Blue Weaver (organ), Clive Taylor (bass) and Neil Jones (guitar) into a new band, Fair Weather. The band's "Natural Sinner" peaked at No. 6 in the UK in July 1970, but their albums, Beginning From An End and Let Your Mind Roll On, failed to chart.

After twelve months, Fairweather Low left to pursue a solo career. He released four albums up to 1980 on A&M and Warner Bros. These spawned further single chart success with "Reggae Tune" (1974), and "Wide Eyed and Legless", a No. 6 Christmas-time hit in 1975. Welsh group Budgie covered "I Ain't No Mountain" off Fairweather Low's 1974 album Spider Jiving on their 1975 release Bandolier.

In the late 1970s and 1980s he worked for numerous artists as a session musician, performing as a backing vocalist and guitarist on albums by Roy Wood, Leo Sayer, Albion Band, Gerry Rafferty, Helen Watson, and Richard and Linda Thompson.

=== 1978–1999 ===
In 1978, Fairweather Low sang backing vocals on the album Who Are You, from the Who, specifically on the tracks "New Song", "Had Enough", "Guitar and Pen", "Love Is Coming Down", and "Who Are You". On the Who's 1982 album It's Hard, he played rhythm guitar on the song "It's Your Turn". Fairweather Low later appeared on Townshend's 1993 album Psychoderelict and the accompanying concert tour.

In 1995, Fairweather Low played rhythm guitar on Joe Satriani's self-titled CD, along with Nathan East on bass and Manu Katché on drums. One reviewer commented that "this backup band of extremely gifted backup musicians sincerely adds a diverse range of textures and colors, bringing out a much-needed live feel to an otherwise bland album of blues-oriented jazz-rock."

For 22 years he was a guitarist for The Bleeding Heart Band, the backing band for Roger Waters. Fairweather Low worked with Waters from his The Pros and Cons of Hitchhiking tour of America in 1985. He contributed to two of Waters' albums – Radio KAOS in 1987 and Amused to Death in 1992. He played guitar and bass on Roger Waters' all-star performance of The Wall – Live in Berlin on 21 July 1990, on the 1999–2002 In the Flesh world tour and was playing on Waters' Dark Side of the Moon Live world tour in 2006 and 2007, but was not able to perform with him in 2008. His role was picked up by session guitarist Chester Kamen.

In 1992, he began working on projects alongside Eric Clapton. Fairweather Low had earlier appeared in Clapton's band in the 1983 ARMS concerts for Ronnie Lane and, while he has continued to do session work for various people, including Dave Edmunds, Fairweather Low has spent most of his time since the early 1990s as a sideman in Clapton's backing band, as well as session work; notably Clapton's Unplugged concerts, as well as on From The Cradle.

In the same year, he was present on tours with the 1999 Linda Ronstadt and Emmylou Harris collaboration. In December 1991, he played guitar on George Harrison's Live in Japan tour and album, along with the rest of Clapton's band, and in 2002, he played several of the lead guitar parts for the Harrison tribute Concert for George, on some songs playing Harrison's famous Fender Stratocaster "Rocky" and Harrison's gold Fender Electric XII. In 2004, he appeared in the Stratpack concert, celebrating 50 years of the Fender Stratocaster.

=== Work since 2000 ===
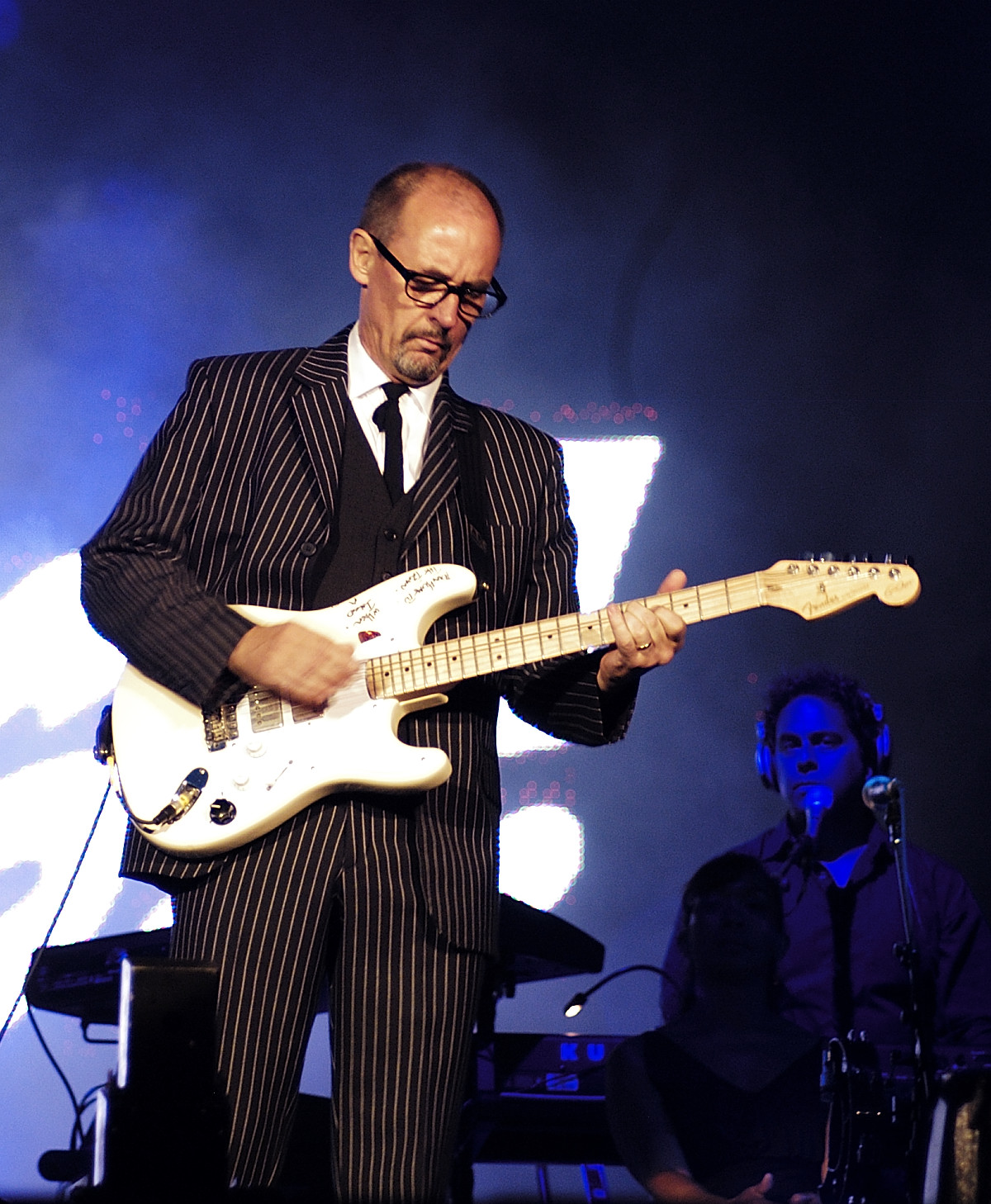
Fairweather Low with Roger Waters at Roskilde Festival, Denmark in 2006. Jon Carin is on keys in the background.

From 1998 to 2002, he played in Roger Waters' In the Flesh tour. In 2001, Fairweather Low accompanied Eric Clapton on his world tour and is featured on the 2002 album One More Car, One More Rider, which also features accompaniment by Billy Preston, Steve Gadd, Nathan East and David Sancious.

In 2002, Fairweather Low featured on From Clarksdale to Heaven – Remembering John Lee Hooker with, among others, Jeff Beck, Gary Brooker, Jack Bruce and Peter Green. By 2005, he toured extensively with Bill Wyman's Rhythm Kings. Some of the concerts were recorded for UK television, as part of their "50 Years of Rock 'n' Roll" tribute. In April 2005 he played in the Gary Brooker Ensemble's charity concert at Guildford Cathedral, Surrey, in aid of the Tsunami Appeal.

In 2006, Fairweather Low toured with Roger Waters once more, this time for the latter's The Dark Side of the Moon Live tour, and with Bill Wyman's Rhythm Kings. In the same year Fairweather Low toured with Chris Barber and the Big Chris Barber Band reprising many of his earlier hits, including "Gin House Blues" and "Worried Man Blues". Some of these performances form part of Barber's latest CD, Can't Stop Now, featuring new arrangements by Barber's staff-arranger and trombonist, Bob Hunt. Also in 2006, Fairweather Low released Sweet Soulful Music, his first solo album in twenty-six years. The song "Hymn for My Soul" became the title track of Joe Cocker's 2007 album. Cocker's tour of 2007/08 bore the same title.

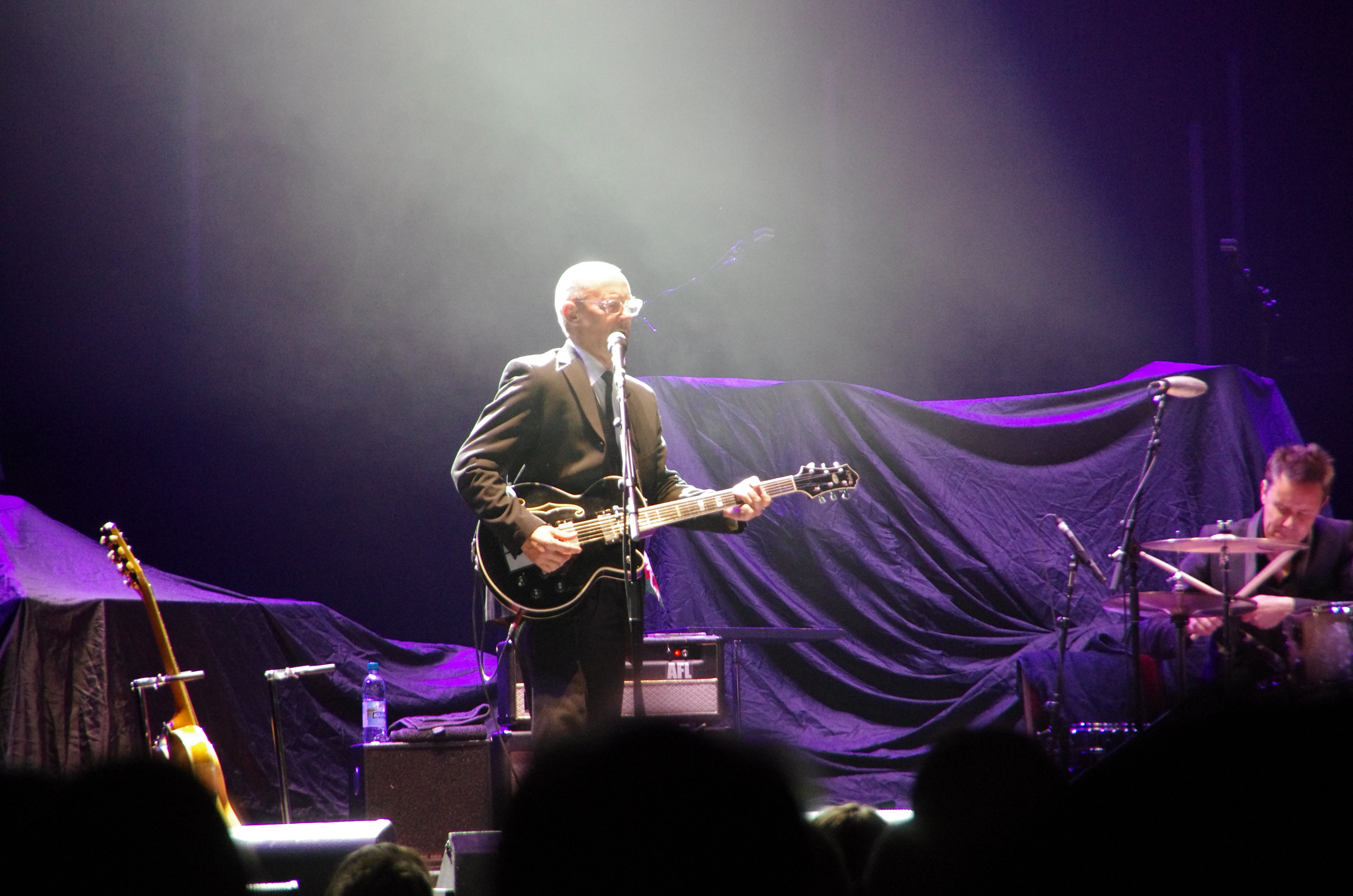
Andy Fairweather Low on stage as support act to Eric Clapton and Steve Winwood at London's Royal Albert Hall; 27 May 2011

In 2007, he continued touring with Roger Waters' Dark Side of the Moon Tour. Later that year, as part of his own Sweet Soulful Music tour, he performed at venues such as the Stables in Wavendon, The Ferry in Glasgow and the Library Theatre, Darwen, Lancashire.

In May 2008, Fairweather Low & the Lowriders started a UK tour, the Low Riders being Paul Beavis, Dave Bronze and Richard Dunn. In 2009, he joined Eric Clapton's band for a series of 11 concerts held at the London's Royal Albert Hall. He became part of Clapton's touring band with drummer Steve Gadd and keyboardist Tim Carmon throughout May 2009. In 2011, Fairweather Low joined Clapton for another series of concerts at the Royal Albert Hall. He also performs with Edie Brickell, Steve Gadd, and bassist (and fellow Welshman) Pino Palladino as The Gaddabouts; their eponymous album was released in early 2011, and their second album, Look Out Now!, was released in 2012.

Also in 2011, Fairweather Low made a guest appearance on Kate Bush's album 50 Words For Snow, singing on the chorus of the album's only single, "Wild Man".

In 2013, he opened Eric Clapton's shows with his band the Lowriders on Clapton's European tour and, later that year, Fairweather Low & the Lowriders released the album, Zone-O-Tone. In April 2013, he appeared at the Eric Clapton Guitar Festival Crossroads in New York and featured on two tracks of the DVD of the concert. On 13–14 November, he was also part of Eric Clapton's band on the occasion of Clapton's two concerts during the "Baloises Sessions" in Basel, Switzerland, where he was featured singing "Gin House Blues". In November 2015, Fairweather Low made a guest appearance on Kevin Brown's album Grit.

Between September 2021 and April 2022, Fairweather Low & the Low Riders undertook an extensive UK tour, billed as "On The Road Again", playing over 50 dates and ending at the Flowerpot in Derby on 30 April 2022. On 31 December 2022/1 January 2023 he appeared as a guest artist on the Jools' Annual Hootenanny show on BBC2 to welcome in the new year.

During the COVID-19 lockdown, Fairweather Low recorded a new solo album, Flang Dang, at Rockfield Studios, on which he played every instrument except drums. The album was released in February 2023 under The Last Music Company label.

== Personal life ==
Fairweather Low was married to Barbara, the sister of his Amen Corner and Fair Weather band-mate Neil Jones.

== Solo album discography ==
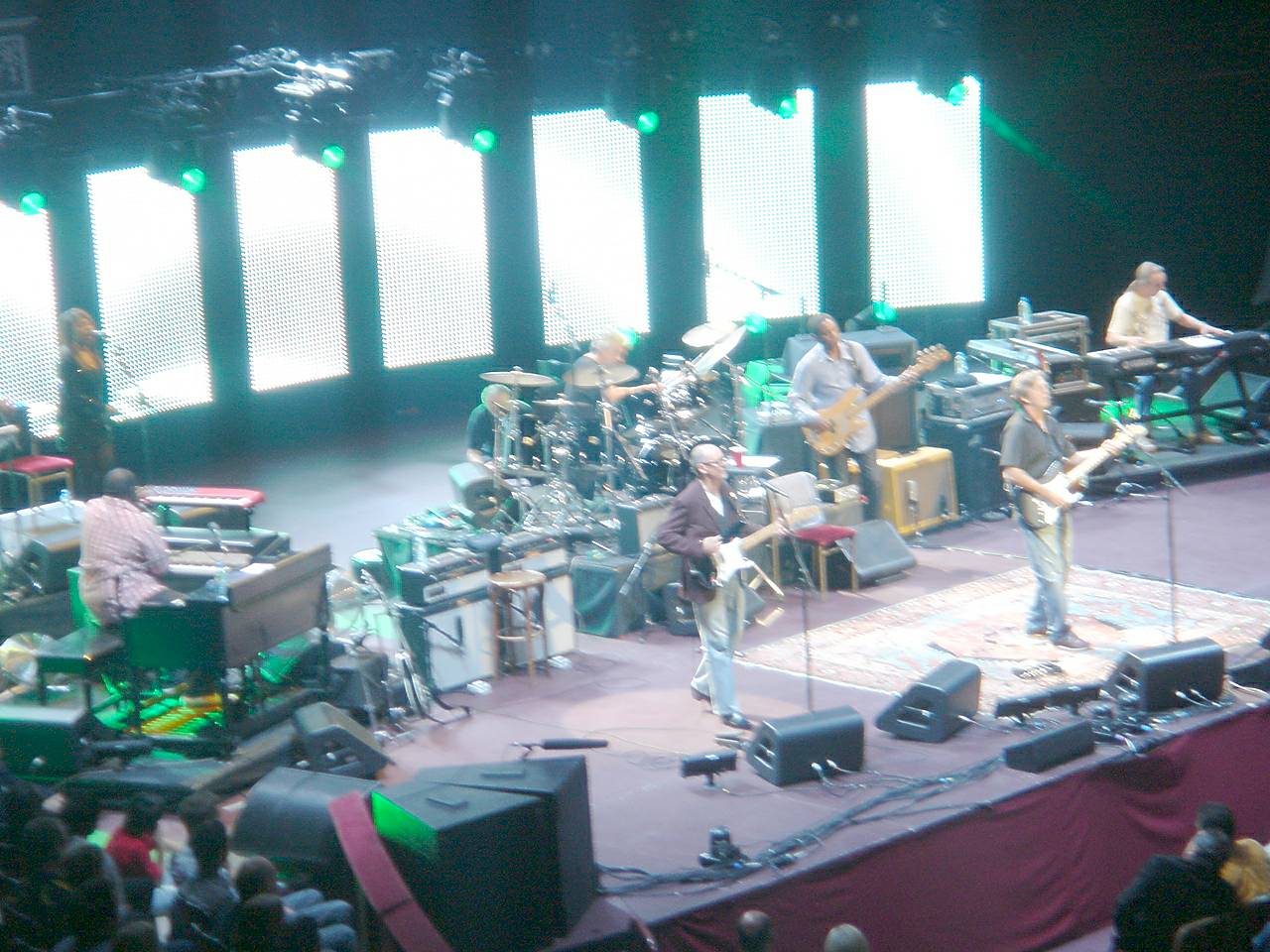
Andy Fairweather Low on stage with Eric Clapton at London's Royal Albert Hall, 23 May 2009

- Spider Jiving (1974)
- La Booga Rooga (1975)
- Be Bop 'n' Holla (1976)
- Mega Shebang (1980)
- Wide Eyed And Legless: The A&M Recordings (First three albums on a double CD release) (2004)
- Sweet Soulful Music (2006)
- Best of Andy Fairweather Low – Low Rider (2008)
- Live in Concert (DVD) 2008
- Lively (Sold at concerts exclusively) (2012)
- Zone-O-Tone (2013)
- Live From The New Theatre, Cardiff (Limited Edition 2CD/1DVD set) (2015)
- Lockdown Live (2021)
- Flang Dang (2023)
- The Invisible Bluesman (2025)
