= Bang =

Bang, bang!, or bangs may refer to:

== Products ==
- M1922 Bang rifle, a US semi-automatic rifle designed by Søren Hansen Bang
- Bang, a model car brand
- Bang (beverage), an energy drink

== Geography ==
- Bang, Central African Republic
- Bang, Lorestan, a village in Iran
- Bangs, Ohio, United States
- Bangs, Texas, United States

== People ==
- Bang (surname)
- Bangs (surname)
- Bang, pseudonym of Barbro Alving (1909-1987), Swedish journalist
- Stage name for Bae "Bang" Jun-sik, professional League of Legends player for Evil Geniuses

== Print media ==
- Bang!, a 2005 young adult novel by Sharon G. Flake
- Bang: The Pickup Bible That Helps You Get More Lays, a 2007 book by Roosh V
- Bang, a character in the manga series One-Punch Man
- Bay Area News Group (BANG), the largest newspaper publisher in the San Francisco Bay Area

=== Magazines ===
- Bang (magazine), founded 1991, Swedish magazine
- The Bang (Vagabonds), 1907-1917, the weekly magazine of the Vagabonds (National Arts Club)

== Film and television ==
- Bang (TV series), a bilingual crime drama TV series from Wales
- Bang (film), a 1997 American film
- Bang! (film), a 1977 Swedish film
- "Bang" (Daredevil)
- "Bang" (Desperate Housewives)
- "Bang" (The Good Wife)
- "Bang" (Harper's Island)
- "Bang" (The Shield)
- "Bangs", an episode of "The Protector"
- Bang Cartoon, a website

== Games ==
- Bang! (card game)
- Bang! (arcade game)
- Bang! (drama game), a game involving imaginary guns
- Bang! (video game)
- Bang Shishigami, a BlazBlue character

== Music ==
- Bang! (opera), by John Rutter
- Bang Records, a record label
- Bang! Records, a record label
- Bang (company), a music and sound production company from NYC

=== Groups and musicians ===
- Bang (Greek band), a Greek pop music group
- Bang (American band), an American hard rock group
- Bang! (band), a British happy hardcore group
- Bangs (band), an American punk rock group
- Bangs (hip hop artist) (born 1992), South Sudanese-Australian hip hop artist

=== Albums ===
- Bang! (1985 Frankie Goes to Hollywood album)
- Bang (Anitta album), 2015
- Bang (Chief Keef album), 2011
- Bang (James Gang album), 1973
- Bang (The Jesus Lizard album), 2000
- Bang (Rockapella album), 2002
- Bang! (Cinema Bizarre album), 2009
- Bang! (Corey Hart album), 1990
- Bang! (Gotthard album) and its title track, 2014
- Bang! (Thunder album), 2008
- Bang! (World Party album), 1993
- Bang!... The Greatest Hits of Frankie Goes to Hollywood, 1993

=== EPs ===
- Bang (Rita Ora and Imanbek EP), 2021
- Bang, 2007 EP by Nightmare of You
- Bang! (EP), 1997 EP by the Goo Goo Dolls

=== Songs ===
- "Bang" (Anitta song), 2015
- "Bang" (Blur song), 1991
- "Bang" (Gorky Park song), 1989
- "Bang" (Rye Rye song), featuring M.I.A.,
- "Bang!" (After School song), 2011
- "Bang!" (AJR song), 2020
- Bang (Conway the Machine song), 2019
- "Bang", a song by Waka Flocka Flame featuring YG Hootie & Slim Dunkin on the album Flockaveli
- "Bang", a song by Dave Dee, Dozy, Beaky, Mick & Tich from the album If Music Be the Food of Love... Prepare for Indigestion
- "Bang", a song by Yeah Yeah Yeahs from the EP Yeah Yeah Yeahs
- "Bang", a song by Badmarsh & Shri from the album Signs
- "Bang!", a song by The Raveonettes from the album In and Out of Control
- "Bangs", a song by They Might Be Giants on the album Mink Car

== Other uses ==
- !Bang, a search syntax used by search engine DuckDuckGo
- !Bang!, a professional wrestling promotion
- Bang (Korean), a room or building
- Bangs (hair), the part of the hair overhanging the forehead
- Bang's disease
- Exclamation mark (!), a punctuation symbol sometimes called a "bang"
  - Interrobang (‽), a nonstandard punctuation mark intended to combine the functions of the question mark and the exclamation mark (the latter is known in printers' and programmers' jargon as a "bang")
  - shebang (Unix), the #! character sequence used to specify an interpreter for a computer program
- An onomatopoeia, specifically a word that imitates the sound of an explosion or gunshot, like in comics
- A sound of a gun or a firearm
- Slang for an explosion
- Slang for "to have sex with"
- Slang for flash-bang

== See also ==
- BANG file, a point access method
- Bang path, a type of e-mail address
- Banging (disambiguation)
- Bhang, an edible preparation of cannabis
- Bang Bang (disambiguation)
- Big Bang (disambiguation)
- "Not with a bang but a whimper", quote from T.S. Eliot
