= Dave Dee, Dozy, Beaky, Mick & Tich discography =

- Studio albums: 6
- EPs: 2
- Compilation albums: 16
- Singles: 30
- Video albums: 3

This is the discography of the British band Dave Dee, Dozy, Beaky, Mick & Tich.

== Albums ==
=== Studio albums ===
Title	Details	Peak chart positions	
Title	Details	UK	GER
Dave Dee, Dozy, Beaky, Mick & Tich (Note: At the last minute the track "007" because of a copyright infringement with the Ian Fleming/James Bond Organisation had to be hurriedly re-recorded and came out as "Double Agent". If you look carefully at the back of the UK LP cover/sleeve you will find a different print font size where the master artwork had to be corrected.)	Released: 24 June 1966; Label: Fontana; 13 tracks LP/MC (mono/stereo)	11	4
If Music Be the Food of Love... Prepare for Indigestion (Note: The UK album release came out with an unusual and original sleeve idea plus title with three members and the first part of the title on the front and the other two members and the second part of the title on the back of the sleeve/cover (Canada, New Zealand & South Africa used the same sleeve design/format as the UK). Whether it was initially/originally envisaged as a gatefold sleeve is not known. One way you can see the 'complete & full image' was to place both the stereo and mono releases front and back alongside each other. In Germany and Australia they chose/devised different ways to have all five members on the front sleeve but hence missing its original/novel concept. The German sleeve though was quite bright/colourful losing the dark more somber background of the UK issue. Concerning the "…Prepare For Indigestion" addition to the title then some involved in the album did not like this, but finally the heads of UK Fontana/Philips had the final say (note that Australia dropped the "…Prepare For Indigestion" part). It is not known whether reaching agreement & manufacturing of the final cover design/concept delayed the UK release or not.) (Note: One of the key tracks on the album is the humorous/fun "Loos Of England" which received a quasi-ban in the UK (i.e. see Record Mirror 25 February 1967 p.4 where they were not allowed to perform the track on Doddy's Music Box (Ken Dodd's show)). From all historical accounts "Loos" was never performed on UK TV and also seemingly never played on the BBC (i.e. there is no special BBC re-recording for "Loos" as there was for 6 other tracks on the album). It was an effort to veer away from standard love song fare into lavatories and "Loos Of England" was a track that was either 'pure genius' or 'an embarrassment' as it ran through the public conveniences of England, France, USA, Greece, Russia and Australia with respective clever unusual musical interludes for each country. "Loos" never really created the buzz intended, though Fontana/Philips a couple of months after the album release, released 'Loos" as the flagship track for an EP which did reach No. 8 in the UK EP chart.) (Note: Reviews at the time by NME, Record Mirror, Melody Maker (each in their respective 17 December 1966 magazine editions) for "If Music Be The Food Of Love…" were very positive with comments such as: "which make the LP a remarkable one", "it is a good example of some of the best pop music this country is producing", "they have come up with an excellent album". The Disc & ME review 24 December 1966 issue p.12 states "for sheer good spirits & energy you can't beat them" but with an almost contradictory statement (like a double edged sword) in "but by far & away the best track is the Eddie Cochran styled "Help Me"". Strange statement considering that according to the other reviews there were many other strong tracks in "Bend It", "Hideaway", "All I Want", "Loos Of England", "You Make It Move", "Shame", "Master Llewellyn", "Bang", "I'm On The Up", "Hair Of My Chinny-Chin-Chin" & "Hands Off".)	Released: 16 December 1966 (Note: The album had been completed by end of October 1966 with original release date scheduled as 25 November 1966 (i.e. see NME 4 November 1966 p.9 & where also next single "Save Me" was going to be released on the same day). There was a small advert for the album in the Disc & Music Echo issue 26 November on p.17. The Record Mirror 3 December 1966 p.4 then stated that "IMBTFOL…" & "Save Me" would both be released on 2 December. For various reasons the album release date then eventually slipped another 2 weeks to 16 December 1966 thus missing out on the all-important 1966 UK pre-teen/teen Xmas market (only really getting into the shops after Christmas and hence eventually first charting on 7 January 1967). This delay into the new year also coincided with the arrival of The Monkees who were at this moment storming the UK charts (with an instant fame) & would have attracted away some of the potential audience for the DDDBM&T LP. Perhaps this overall release delay therefore was a partial reason for the LP's eventual relatively poorer than expected chart performance. The single "Save Me" (was not on the album) was released on 2 December and entered the 10 December chart at the No. 32 position, hence was nicely timed for the Xmas market.); Label: Fontana; 12 tracks LP/MC (mono/stereo)	27 (Note: After having spent during 1966 a total of 50 weeks in the UK Singles Chart (more than any other act for that year 1966 i.e. see p. 387 of Guinness British Hit Singles 9th Edition ISBN 0-85112-526-3) (Note that in 1965 The Seekers had won that accolade with their 51 weeks in the UK Singles Chart), plus coming after a No. 2 hit in "Bend It" and with now "Save Me" currently at No. 4, & further supported by four very positive/favourable album reviews by the UK music press, then big things were expected with this album release. Therefore after having only reached a HP of No. 27 & 5 weeks in the chart (chart progress positions were No. 37, 29, 27, 27, 32) there was a sense of disappointment and concern within the DDDBM&T camp. Their 'fun & friendly' left field beat music along with the variety & versality demonstrated on the LP should have surely performed better? For supporting information and some possible reasons for its lack of success then see the other 'Album Notes' for this LP. Just after the album had quickly exited the charts then Dave Dee in Record Mirror 11 February 1967 p. 3 explained to the interviewer Norman Jopling that "the group were very pessimistic about their future", "seemed to be up against a brick wall" and that they "now needed to change". Because of the album's lack of success, then from this point on in the UK, DDDBM&T became known as a "Singles Act" and afterwards had very little major album success. In Germany (the world's 3rd largest record market at the time) then the album did well and reached HP No.4 & was 20 weeks in the charts…'unusually' much better than what it had achieved in the UK (DDDBM&T's home-country) and where Germans liked that solid drum & bass beat music sound that DDDBM&T produced.)	4 (Note: Coincident with the chart high position of No. 4 (in the Bravo LP Chart it reached No. 3) they had just been voted in Germany by the Bravo magazine as the World's Top Act (the Bravo Otto Wahl Award). This was in 27 March 1967 edition of the magazine where they had won the award with 82,034 votes with The Beatles coming 2nd with 79,669 votes and The Beach Boys 3rd with 28,986 votes.)
If No-One Sang	Released: 31 May 1968; Label: Fontana; 12 tracks LP/MC (mono/stereo); Released in the US as Time To Take Off	45	30
Together (Note: The "Together" album was released on the "Fontana Special" label which was budget priced and so therefore the album was ineligible for the UK Album Charts. It was also released just after Dave Dee had left the group with now DBM&T proceeding down a completely different musical path and so there would be no promotion. Coupled with its shorter than normal album playing time (31m41s), then Fontana/Philips Records decided on a "budget price release" and also being cheaper as a sort of gift to the DDDBM&T fans. Probably due to these reasons then neither NME, Record Mirror nor Melody Maker reviewed the album (for Disc & ME it is not known if there was a review or not?) plus there were no images or promotion of the LP presented within any of these UK music papers. Instead of going out with a bang then DDDBM&T and the Swinging Sixties went out with a whimper. To note that the NME did report in their 4 October 1969 edition on p.8 that the LP was released on 4 October 1969. Notwithstanding this indifference the album proved to be a very reasonable effort. As an All Music review states "There were at least 7 possible singles here." "magnificent harmonies & production" "Not a dud track & a pity the album is so underrated/underestimated." "Star tracks "Love Is A Drum", "Mountains Of The Moon" & "Margareta Lidman"." The full review can be found here:)	Released: 12 September 1969; Label: Fontana Special; 10 tracks LP (stereo)	—	—
Fresh Ear	Released: October 1970; Label: Philips; As D,B,M+T	—	—
Dave Dee, Dozy, Beaky, Mick & Tich	Released: 1984; Label: Heartbreak Hotel; Album of tracks re-recorded in July 1984	—	—
"—" denotes releases that did not chart or were not released in that territory.

=== Compilation albums ===
Title	Details	Peak chart positions		
Title	Details	UK	NL	US
Greatest Hits (Note: Fontana/Mercury Records USA decided not to release either of their first two LPs Dave Dee, Dozy, Beaky, Mick & Tich and If Music Be the Food of Love... Prepare for Indigestion and instead belatedly released this 10 track affair as DDDBM&T's first USA album. Why though incongruously only 10 tracks (26m11s in length) when there were then 34 DDDBM&T studio tracks currently available and where a 14 track album (circa 37mins long i.e. at the time the No. 1 U.S. album was The Beatles Sgt. Pepper's Lonely Hearts Club Band which was 39m38s in length) might have at least attracted via better value the more casual record buyer and given a slightly improved chance for success into the USA. Suggested additional tracks would have been "Frustration", "Hard to Love You", "Shame" and "Help Me". The DDDBM&T camp made it clear that they were unhappy with the performance of their U.S. record company Fontana/Mercury and shortly after this release changed/switched to Imperial/Liberty Records.) (Note: This their debut U.S. album was issued a long 18 months after the release in January 1966 of their first U.S. single "You Make It Move". At the time other acts (i.e. The Cyrkle, The Happenings, Crispian St. Peters…also The Palm Beach Band Boys who had actually issued a cover version of "Bend It!") had debut LPs immediately coming out in the U.S. (along with their single releases)! One possible explanation for this long delay was that DDDBM&T's five singles issued so far in the U.S. had had little success. DDDBM&T were also caught up in the 'British Invasion Backlash' (instigated in order to protect home-grown U.S. talent from a previous domination by UK acts) which meant a continual rejection of their work permits/visas, therefore not allowing/clearing DDDBM&T to come to the U.S. & promote their singles. The band had made it known from the beginning, since 1962 as Dave Dee & The Bostons playing Hamburg and impressing the U.S. sailors stationed there, that they wanted to be successful in the U.S. Therefore with their debut U.S. single issued in the January, they had planned already to come in February 1966 (i.e. see NME 31 December 1965 p.6 and Billboard 15 January 1966 page 23). Throughout 1966 and early 1967 DDDBM&T/Mercury Records could never get visas/work permits cleared and that it was finally only in April 1967 that the permission was granted. In Billboard 28 April 1967 p.3 it states: "Mercury UK Group OK’d In U.S. Tour. Chicago – Mercury Records has overcome the usual stringent obstacles to foreign talent imports into the U.S. and announced last week that its recording group, known as Dave Dee, Dozy, Beaky, Mick & Tich, has been cleared for an 26 April–May 4 tour of some 10 cities. The rare clearance came as a result of co-operation by the U.S. State Department and the U.S. Department of Naturalization and Immigration. The group obtained an H-1 visa." The piece went on to state, "Fontana is rushing out an album". This clearance though had taken Fontana/Mercury by surprise because when DDDBM&T finally came there was no single nor album out then to support their tour. Noting that it was just a "promotion" tour with no "live" performances (actually being DDDBM&T's forte) permitted. Along with this there was also the previous banning of their 4th U.S. single "Bend It", which added to the adversity encountered and hence taking everything into consideration produced the long delay to the album release date.) (Note: Calling it "Greatest Hits" even if the release does include 6 UK hits was a misnomer as there were incongruously no U.S. hits on it. In the Billboard Magazine 22 January 1966 issue then "Spotlight Singles" p.16 predicted that DDDBM&T's debut U.S. single "You Make It Move" (on the album) would go Top 60 "this hard driving rocker loaded with teen dance appeal has all the earmarks of a smash in the U.S." Billboard Spotlight predicted for 2nd U.S. single "Hold Tight!" to go Top 60; "Hideaway" Top 100; "Bend It!" Top 60; "Save Me" Top 100. If Billboard had been correct in at least one of their 5 single release predictions (all are on the album), then DDDBM&T's story in the U.S. may have been different. Billboard Magazine 19 March 1966 p.16 stated for "Hold Tight!": "Good group vocal on ultra-big beat dance rhythm for a left field winner. Top-of-the chart contender." Concerning "Bend It!" then this may have made the Top 60 but then there was a record ban placed onto it. Fontana/Mercury for the first 4 singles put no publicity into Billboard magazines. There was for "Save Me" though a full-page advert along with the first photo of the band (actually seen in Billboard) placed in 28 January 1967 issue p.35. Fontana/Mercury were a relatively small record company based in Chicago and lacked the clout that the major labels had throughout the vast U.S., which could partially explain why none of the 5 DDDBM&T singles on the album became hits. Perhaps also the DJ's & Radio Station Programmers were also somehow swayed by the "British Invasion Backlash" and so did not give the DDDBM&T records a fair spin. In Lillian Roxon's famed 1969 Rock Encyclopedia (Library Of Congress Catalog Card Number: 77-75342) it is stated for DDDBM&T "The group specializes in good, clean, wildly entertaining very sexy off-colour fun, beautifully staged. They should have made it in America by now. Almost everyone else has, and they're better than some." The album was finally released in the July of 1967 and in 29 July 1967 Billboard issue on p.37 in the "New Action Albums" section then the DDDBM&T album was mentioned/presented along with 2 others. Billboard though did not do any review for the album in their "Album Reviews" section. Fontana/Mercury never placed any publicity into Billboard for the "Greatest Hits" album but confusingly the parent/partner company in the Netherlands Fontana/Philips, probably due to what was amounting to extreme frustration, placed a full page advert into the Billboard issue 22 July 1967 p.51 for instead the If Music Be the Food of Love... Prepare for Indigestion album (utilizing the Germany/Netherlands artwork) with supporting words "Now taking a big bite of the cherry in the $ market"! That album was never issued in the U.S. There seemed to be forces against the band in ever having any success in the U.S.)	Released: July 1967; Label: Fontana; US and Canada-only release; 10 tracks LP/MC (mono/stereo) (Note: The album was actually available in at least 6 formats…mono vinyl LPs, stereo vinyl LPs, reel-to-reel tapes, both 4 and 8 track cartridges and music cassettes.)	—	—	155
Golden Hits of Dave Dee, Dozy, Beaky, Mick & Tich	Released: November 1967; Label: Fontana; 12 tracks LP (includes 7 tracks first time on LP)	—	—	—
D D D B M T (A Plea For Sanity)	Released: 8 March 1968; Label: Fontana Special; 10 tracks LP (includes 3 tracks first time on LP)	—	—	—
Legend Of...	Released: February 1969; Label: Fontana Special; 10 tracks LP (includes 4 tracks first time on LP)	—	—	—
Greatest Hits	Released: November 1971; Label: Philips International; 12 tracks LP (with 10 UK hits)	—	—	—
Greatest Hits	Released: June 1976; Label: Philips Sonic; 12 tracks LP/MC (with 12 UK hits)	—	—	—
Greatest Hits	Released: May 1984; Label: Philips Price; 13 tracks LP/MC (with 13 UK hits)	—	—	—
Hits Album	Released: 1987; Label: K-tel; Netherlands-only release; 18 tracks LP/CD/MC (includes "Tonight Today" and was DDDBM&T's first CD release)	—	18	—
The Best of Dave Dee, Dozy, Beaky, Mick & Tich	Released: 1990; Label: The Collection	—	—	—
Greatest Hits	Released: 1991; Label: Fontana	—	—	—
Zabadak	Released: 1995; Label: Karussell/Spectrum Music	—	—	—
Hold Tight! The Best of the Fontana Years	Released: October 1995; Label: Collectables; US-only release	—	—	—
The Best of Dave Dee, Dozy, Beaky, Mick & Tich	Released: November 1995; Label: Spectrum Music	—	—	—
The Complete Collection	Released: November 1996; Label: Mercury; 46 tracks 2 CD	—	—	—
All the Hits Plus More	Released: 1997; Label: Startel Entertainment	—	—	—
Together	Released: February 1997; Label: BR Music; Expansion of the studio album to include a number of unreleased and previously released songs; 22 tracks CD	—	—	—
Boxed!	Released: April 1999; Label: BR Music; 100 tracks 4 CD	—	—	—
The Singles	Released: April 1999; Label: BR Music; 25 tracks CD	—	—	—
Dave Dee, Dozy, Beaky, Mick & Tich	Released: 2001; Label: Forever Gold	—	—	—
The BBC Sessions	Released: March 2008; Label: BR Music; Netherlands-only release	—	—	—
The Very Best of Dave Dee, Dozy, Beaky, Mick & Tich	Released: 8 September 2008; Label: Universal Music TV	24	—	—
Hold On [The Singles 1970 - 1971] (Dave Dee solo album) (Note: This contains both the A and B sides of Dave Dee's 6 solo singles released at the time 1970 - 1971 (those 12 tracks that are on this album). Other than Dave Dee's fine vocals (pleasant, smooth and appealing), the superb songwriting/production, is the gentle and beautiful variety that can be found throughout: (a) 5 ballad tracks with some great unique orchestral backing work on them, "My Woman's Man" and "I've Gotta Make You Part of Me" (both with the John Gregory Orchestra), "Annabella" and "Kelly" (both with the Zack Lawrence Orchestra), "Everything About Her" (the Peter Lee Stirling Orchestra), then (b) the 4 more gentle acoustic soft ballad type numbers "Sweden", "If I Believed In Tomorrow", "Mary Morning, Mary Evening", "Don't You Ever Change Your Mind" and then (c) the 3 more pop type numbers "Wedding Bells", "Hold On" and "Swingy".)	Released: July 2021; Label: Universal Music; 12 tracks (36m07s) (mp3 download only with as yet no physical release) (stereo)	—	—	—
The Complete French EP’s & Singles Collection	Released: September 2023; Label: Magic	—	—	—
"—" denotes releases that did not chart or were not released in that territory.

=== Video albums ===
Title	Details
Greatest Hits	Released: 2003; Label: BR Music; Netherlands-only release
The Legend of Xanadu	Released: 2005; Label: Universal, BR Music; Germany and Netherlands-only release
Beat Beat Beat	Released: 2008; Label: ABC Entertainment; Split album with the Troggs

Album notes

== EPs ==
Title (Note: This is a list of EPs released in the UK. Various other EPs were released elsewhere.)	Details	Peak chart positions
Title	Details	UK
Loos of England	Released: February 1967; Label: Fontana	8
Classic Cuts	Released: October 1980; Label: Philips	—
"—" denotes releases that did not chart.

== Singles ==
Title	Year	Peak chart positions											Album
Title	Year	UK	AUS	BE (FLA)	BE (WA)	CAN	GER	IRE	NL	NZ	SA	US	Album
"No Time" (Note: "No Time" made No. 5 in Singapore (see Billboard Magazine p.22 issue 1965-03-20) and made No. 1 in Salisbury (see Salisbury Journal 5 February 1965).) b/w "Is It Love?"	1965	—	—	—	—	—	—	—	—	—	—	—	Dave Dee, Dozy, Beaky, Mick & Tich (Note: "No Time" is track 5 on side 2. Single B side "Is It Love?" was not released on any LP and eventually appeared as track 18 on the UK 1991 "Greatest Hits" CD.)
"All I Want" b/w "It Seems A Pity"	1965	—	—	—	—	—	—	—	—	—	—	—	If Music Be the Food of Love... (Note: "All I Want" is track 4 on side 2 and is a slightly different version to that of the 7" single. Single B side "It Seems A Pity" was not on any LP and eventually appeared as track 20 on the UK 1991 "Greatest Hits" CD ("All I Want" was the 7" version on this CD).)
"You Make It Move" b/w "I Can't Stop"	1965	26	—	—	—	—	—	—	—	—	—	—	If Music Be the Food of Love...
"Hold Tight!" b/w "You Know What I Want"	1966	4	21 (Note: The Go-Set chart did not exist until October 1966, so chart peak is from David Kent's retrospective charts.)	—	—	52	4	—	—	8	7	—	Dave Dee, Dozy, Beaky, Mick & Tich
"Hideaway" b/w "Here's a Heart"	1966	10	80	—	—	69	3	10	— (Note: "Hideaway" did not enter the Dutch Single Top 100, but did peak at number 28 on the Dutch Top 40.)	13	—	—	If Music Be the Food of Love...
"Bend It!" b/w "She's So Good"	1966	2	16	16	22	94	1	3	4	1	1	—	If Music Be the Food of Love...
"Bend It!" (re-recording) (Note: Due to controversy surrounding the lyrics after its initial release in the US, "Bend It!" was re-recorded with altered lyrics and re-released there.) b/w "She's So Good"	1966	—	—	—	—	—	—	—	—	—	—	110	Greatest Hits
"Hard to Love You" (Note: "Hard to Love You" was only released in Germany and New Zealand with the B-side "No Time" and in the Netherlands with the B-side "Frustration".) b/w "No Time" / "Frustration"	1966	—	—	—	—	—	10	—	—	17	—	—	Dave Dee, Dozy, Beaky, Mick & Tich
"Save Me" b/w "Shame"	1966	3	25	17	20	93	2	14	8	5	8	—	Non-album singles
"Touch Me, Touch Me" b/w "Marina"	1967	13	— (Note: "Touch Me, Touch Me" didn't enter the Go-Set Top 40, but peaked at number 45 on David Kent's retrospective charts.)	—	39	—	8	—	— (Note: "Touch Me, Touch Me" did not enter the Dutch Single Top 100, but did peak at number 31 on the Dutch Top 40.)	7	—	—	Non-album singles
"Okay!" b/w "He's a Raver"	1967	4	— (Note: "Okay!" didn't enter the Go-Set Top 40, but peaked at number 57 on David Kent's retrospective charts.)	10	29	—	5	7	3	10	—	—	Non-album singles
"Zabadak!" b/w "The Sun Goes Down"	1967	3	32	4	16	1	6	7	4	4	13	52	If No-One Sang
"Zabadak!" (Italian version) (Note: The Italian-language version of "Zabadak!" was only released as a single in Italy.) b/w "Follemente Vivo (Save Me)"	1967	—	—	—	—	—	—	—	—	—	—	—	If No-One Sang
"I'll Love You" (Note: "I'll Love You" was only released as a single in Germany. It was a special edition promotional release sold via the Coca-Cola Company and was backed by four Coca-Cola jingles sung by several artists.) b/w "Things Go Better with Coke"		—	—	—	—	—	—	—	—	—	—	—	Non-album single
"The Legend of Xanadu" b/w "Please"	1968	1	6	6	10	10	5	1	5	1	7	123	If No-One Sang
"Break Out" (Note: "Break Out" was only released as a single in the US and Canada.) b/w "Mrs. Thursday"	1968	—	—	—	—	28	—	—	—	—	—	—	If No-One Sang
"Last Night in Soho" b/w "Mrs. Thursday"	1968	8	— (Note: "Late Night in Soho" didn't enter the Go-Set Top 40, but peaked at number 61 on David Kent's retrospective charts.)	—	—	—	13	11	15	4	—	—	Non-album singles
"The Wreck of the 'Antoinette'" b/w "Still Life"	1968	14	— (Note: "The Wreck of the 'Antoinette'" didn't enter the Go-Set Top 40, but peaked at number 48 on David Kent's retrospective charts.)	19	—	—	21	—	—	1	17	—	Non-album singles
"Run Colorado" (Note: "Run Colorado" was only released as a single in Japan.) b/w "Margareta Lidman"	1969	—	—	—	—	—	—	—	—	—	—	—	Together
"Don Juan" b/w "Margareta Lidman"	1969	23	13	4	9	—	22	—	3	13	—	—	Together
"Snake in the Grass" b/w "Bora Bora"	1969	23	— (Note: "Snake in the Grass" didn't enter the Go-Set Top 40, but peaked at number 95 on David Kent's retrospective charts.)	17	46	—	18	—	—	—	—	—	Together
"Tonight Today" (as D B M & T) b/w "Bad News"	1969	—	—	17	49	—	39	—	4	—	—	—	Non-album singles
"My Woman's Man" (as Dave Dee) b/w "Gotta Make You Part Of Me"	1970	42 (Note: It was anticipated/expected at the time that this single would be a big chart success but due to major distribution problems (Philips/Fontana were in the process of computer/automation of their distribution network) then copies were difficult to come by and the chart achievement poor. Two years later this single was re-issued in the hope of rectifying these initial problems.)	52	—	—	—	—	—	—	—	—	—	Non-album singles
"I'm Going Back" (as David) (Note: Dave Dee key vocalist joined by David Martin & Peter Mason. David was the name of Dave Dee's backing group. "I'm Going Back" is on the February 1997 DDDBM&T "Together" CD.) b/w "Sellpin"	1970	—	—	—	—	—	—	—	—	—	—	—	Non-album singles
"Annabella" (as Dave Dee) b/w "Kelly"	1970	—	—	—	—	—	—	—	—	—	—	—	Non-album singles
"Mr. President" (as D. B. M. & T.) b/w "Frisco Annie"	1970	33	— (Note: "Mr. President" didn't enter the Go-Set Top 60, but peaked at number 82 on David Kent's retrospective charts.)	—	—	—	—	—	—	—	—	—	Fresh Ear (Note: Note that the 7" single version of "Mr. President" is 10 seconds shorter than the version on the album and also that B side "Frisco Annie" is not on the album.)
"Everything About Her" (as Dave Dee) b/w "If I Believed In Tomorrow"	1970	—	—	—	—	—	—	—	—	—	—	—	Non-album singles
"Festival" (as D. B. M. & T.) b/w "Leader of a Rock 'n' Roll Band"	1970	—	—	—	—	—	—	—	—	—	—	—	Non-album singles
"Wedding Bells" (as Dave Dee) b/w "Sweden"	1971	—	—	—	—	—	—	—	—	—	—	—	Non-album singles
"I Want To Be There" (as D.B.M. & T.) b/w "For The Use Of Your Son"	1971	—	—	—	—	—	—	—	—	—	—	—	Non-album singles
"Hold On" (as Dave Dee) b/w "Mary Morning, Mary Evening"	1971	—	—	—	—	—	—	—	—	—	—	—	Non-album singles
"Swingy" (as Dave Dee) b/w "Don't You Ever Change Your Mind"	1971	—	—	—	—	—	—	—	—	—	—	—	Non-album singles
"They Won't Sing My Song" (as Dozy, Beaky, Mick & Tich) b/w "Soukie"	1972	—	—	—	—	—	—	—	—	—	—	—	Non-album singles
"My Woman's Man" (as Dave Dee) b/w "Gotta Make You Part Of Me" (single re-released/re-issued) (Note: Due to major distribution problems on its initial Fontana release then this single was now re-issued (UK) in March 1972 on the Philips label in the hope for a better chart performance and success.)	1972	—	—	—	—	—	—	—	—	—	—	—	Non-album singles
"When Freedom Come" (as Mason) (Note: Mason were formed after D.B.M.&T. disbanded in January 1973 and consisted of Beaky, Tich, Peter Mason (Mick#2), Chas O'Brien plus Bob Taylor and who were joined/supported in varying roles/degrees by David Rose & Ian England (ex David (Dave Dee's backing band), on keyboards). Beaky is the lead vocalist on "When Freedom Comes" and the single was released only in the UK and Brazil.) b/w "It's All Gone Wrong"	1973	—	—	—	—	—	—	—	—	—	—	—	Non-album singles
"Fading" (as Mason) (Note: "Fading" was reviewed in the Record Mirror 22 September 1973 and was released only in the UK and Spain.) b/w "It's Alright"	1973	—	—	—	—	—	—	—	—	—	—	—	Non-album singles
"Follow Me" (as Mason) b/w "Peacefully"	1974	—	—	—	—	—	—	—	—	—	—	—	Non-album singles
"She's My Lady" (Note: After Mason there then followed a brief reformation of DDDBM&T who now consisted of Dave Dee, Dozy, Beaky, Peter 'Mick#2' Mason & Tich.) b/w "Babeigh"	1974	—	—	—	—	—	—	—	—	—	—	—	Non-album singles
"I Have No Hold On You" (Dave Dee with Jean Musy) (Note: Dave Dee is the vocalist with lyrics by Ken Howard & Alan Blaikley. French avant-garde/progressive composer Jean Musy is responsible for the music (mainly various keyboards including piano). It was released in UK on Atlantic Records K10556 with release date of 31 January 1975 (from booklet "The New Singles" #559). It became Tony Blackburn's 'Record Of The Week'.) b/w "Few & Far Between"	1975	—	—	—	—	—	—	—	—	—	—	—	Few & Far Between
"You've Got Me on the Run" (as Dozy, Beaky, Mick & Tich) (Note: "You've Got Me on the Run" was unreleased in the UK, but was released in Germany and the Netherlands.) b/w "Rock and Roll"	1979	—	—	—	—	—	—	—	—	—	—	—	Non-album singles
"In the Coven" (as D.B.M. & T.) b/w "I Can't Stop Wanting You"	1981	—	—	—	—	—	—	—	—	—	—	—	Non-album singles
"The Ballad Of Bulldog Bobby" (as Dave & The Bulldogs) (Note: Dave Dee does the vocals accompanied by session musicians on this rousing football song to the tune of "Sloop John B." released for the Spain 1982 World Cup. By the time though that the pressings had been completed the World Cup had already begun (14 June 1982) and so it had missed its moment of opportunity. Alan Callan an executive/associate of Led Zeppelin was involved in this project. It was only released as a single in UK (on the Panache label PAN2).) b/w "Instrumental Version"	1982	—	—	—	—	—	—	—	—	—	—	—	The World Cup Commemorative LP
"Do-Wah-Diddy..." (Note: "Do-Wah-Diddy..." was only released as a single in Germany during January 1983. RCA & WEA in the UK were interested but nothing eventuated.) b/w "Waiting"	1983	—	—	—	—	—	—	—	—	—	—	—	Non-album single
"La Leyenda de Xanadu" (live) (Note: The live version of "The Legend of Xanadu", was only released a single in Spain under the title "La Leyenda de Xanadu". Both sides were recorded at the Hammersmith Odeon on 21 September 1982 at Radio One's 15th Anniversary "Heroes & Villains" concert. John Hatchman (Mick#4) was now the band's drummer.) b/w "What'd I Say" (live)	1983	—	—	—	—	—	—	—	—	—	—	—	Heroes & Villains
"Staying with It" b/w "Sure Thing"	1983	—	—	—	—	—	—	—	—	—	—	—	Non-album singles
"Here We Go" (as the Boys) b/w "Here We Go Again"	1986	—	—	—	—	—	—	—	—	—	—	—	Non-album singles
"Matthew & Son" (as Dozy, Beaky, Mick & Tich) (Note: "Matthew & Son" was only released as a single in the Netherlands and Belgium.) b/w "Matthew & Son (Instrumental)"	1986	—	—	—	—	—	—	—	—	—	—	—	Non-album singles
"Zabadak (Karakakora)" (as Dave Dee + Klaus & Klaus) (Note: Dave Dee does a catchy fun recording of "Zabadak (Karakakora)" with the popular German 'easy listening folk' singer/comedian duo Klaus & Klaus that was only released as a single in Germany (available on 7" (3m18s) and 12" (5m22s) on the Teldec label). A medium length version (4m12s) is on the Klaus & Klaus album "Ach Du Dickes Ei". Note that Klaus Büchner was also in the German rock band Torfrock.) b/w "Trunkenbold"	1989	—	—	—	—	—	—	—	—	—	—	—	Ach Du Dickes Ei (Note: Note that "Zabadak (Karakakora)" with Dave Dee is track 5 on side A and is a 3rd version (4m12s in length).)
"Scirocco"(as Dave Dee & Marmalade) (Note: Dave Dee does the lead vocals for the single "Scirocco" with popular 60s/70s band Marmalade. The song was written by Marmalade frontman Sandy Newman and was only released as a single in Germany on the Hansa label (available on 7" (3m48s), 12" (5m26s) and CDS (both long and short versions)).) b/w "I Don't Believe In Love Anymore"	1989	—	—	—	—	—	—	—	—	—	—	—	Non-album singles
"What You Are"(as Dozy, Beaky, Mick & Tich) (Note: John Hatchman (Mick#4 since 1982) does the lead vocals on "What You Are" (a download only single...no physical release). Other members involved were the original Beaky, Nigel Dixon (bass) and his son Jolyon Dixon (lead guitar) plus Tich with the harmonies.)	2019	—	—	—	—	—	—	—	—	—	—	—	Non-album singles
"—" denotes releases that did not chart or were not released in that territory.
