= Deh Seyd-e Kesht Varzeh =

Deh Seyd-e Kesht Varzeh ده سيدكشت ورزه
- Village
- Location within Iran
- Coordinates: 33°13′32″N 49°10′06″E
- Country: Iran
- Province: Lorestan
- County: Aligudarz
- Bakhsh: Zaz and Mahru
- Rural District: Zaz-e Sharqi

Population (2006)
  - Total: 40
- Time zone: UTC+3:30 (IRST)
  - Summer (DST): UTC+4:30 (IRDT)

Deh Seyd-e Kesht Varzeh (Persian: ده سيدكشت ورزه, also Romanized as Deh Şeyd-e Kesht Varzeh; also known as Deh Şeydāl-e Kesht Varzeh, Kesht-e Varzah, and Şeydālābād) is a village in Zaz-e Sharqi Rural District, Zaz and Mahru District, Aligudarz County, Lorestan Province, Iran. At the 2006 census, its population was 40, in 6 families.
