= Ab Rahmat =

Ab Rahmat اب رحمت
- Village
- Location within Iran
- Coordinates: 33°10′41″N 49°09′48″E
- Country: Iran
- Province: Lorestan
- County: Aligudarz
- Bakhsh: Zaz and Mahru
- Rural District: Zaz-e Sharqi

Population (2006)
  - Total: 21
- Time zone: UTC+3:30 (IRST)
  - Summer (DST): UTC+4:30 (IRDT)

Ab Rahmat (Persian: اب رحمت, also Romanized as Āb Raḩmat) is a village in Zaz-e Sharqi Rural District, Zaz and Mahru District, Aligudarz County, Lorestan province, Iran. At the 2006 census, its population was 21, in 5 families.
