= Del Suran =

Neighborhood in Lorestan province, Iran

Del Suran Persian: دل سوران
- Neighborhood
- Location within Iran
- Coordinates: 33°10′54″N 49°12′40″E
- Country: Iran
- Province: Lorestan
- County: Aligudarz
- District: Zaz and Mahru
- City: Shulabad

Population (2006)
  - Total: 92
- Time zone: UTC+3:30 (IRST)

Del Suran (Persian: دل سوران) (Note: Also romanized as Del Sūrān) is a neighborhood in the city of Shulabad in Zaz and Mahru District of Aligudarz County, Lorestan province, Iran.

== Demographics ==
=== Population ===
At the time of the 2006 National Census, Del Suran's population was 92 in 14 households, when it was a village in Zaz-e Sharqi Rural District. (Note: Formerly Zaz Rural District)

In 2010, the village of Shulabad-e Sofla, after merging with the villages of Asar, Del Suran, Derakht Chaman, Khodadadkosh-e Olya, Khodadadkosh-e Sofla, Sarlak, and Shulabad-e Olya, was converted to a city and renamed Shulabad.
