= Qaleh Nar =

Qaleh Nar قلعه نر
- Village
- Location within Iran
- Coordinates: 33°15′00″N 48°57′00″E
- Country: Iran
- Province: Lorestan
- County: Aligudarz
- Bakhsh: Zaz and Mahru
- Rural District: Zaz-e Gharbi

Population (2006)
  - Total: 443
- Time zone: UTC+3:30 (IRST)
  - Summer (DST): UTC+4:30 (IRDT)

Qaleh Nar (Persian: قلعه نر, also Romanized as Qal‘eh Nar) is a village in Zaz-e Gharbi Rural District, Zaz and Mahru District, Aligudarz County, Lorestan Province, Iran. At the 2006 census, its population was 443, in 76 families.
