= Deh Mohammad Hoseyn =

Deh Mohammad Hoseyn ده محمدحسين
- Village
- Country: Iran
- Province: Lorestan
- County: Aligudarz
- Bakhsh: Zaz and Mahru
- Rural District: Zaz-e Sharqi

Population (2006)
  - Total: 22
- Time zone: UTC+3:30 (IRST)
  - Summer (DST): UTC+4:30 (IRDT)

Deh Mohammad Hoseyn (Persian: ده محمدحسين, also Romanized as Deh Moḥammad Hoseyn) is a village in Zaz-e Sharqi Rural District, Zaz and Mahru District, Aligudarz County, Lorestan Province, Iran. At the 2006 census, its population was 22, in 5 families.
