= Misown =

Misown ميسون
- Village
- Location within Iran
- Coordinates: 33°09′22″N 48°58′09″E
- Country: Iran
- Province: Lorestan
- County: Aligudarz
- Bakhsh: Zaz and Mahru
- Rural District: Zaz-e Gharbi

Population (2006)
  - Total: 25
- Time zone: UTC+3:30 (IRST)
  - Summer (DST): UTC+4:30 (IRDT)

Misown (Persian: ميسون, also Romanized as Mīsown, Mūsīūn, Mesīūn, and Mūsīyon) is a village in Zaz-e Gharbi Rural District, Zaz and Mahru District, Aligudarz County, Lorestan Province, Iran. At the 2006 census, its population was 25, in 4 families.
