= Seh Ran =

Seh Ran (Persian: سه ران) may refer to:

- Seh Ran Bala, Iran
- Seh Ran Pain, Iran

== See also ==
- Seran (disambiguation)
