= Dar Pir Abbas =

Dar Pir Abbas درپيرعباس
- Village
- Country: Iran
- Province: Lorestan
- County: Aligudarz
- Bakhsh: Zaz and Mahru
- Rural District: Mahru

Population (2006)
  - Total: 45
- Time zone: UTC+3:30 (IRST)
  - Summer (DST): UTC+4:30 (IRDT)

Dar Pir Abbas (Persian: درپيرعباس, also Romanized as Dar Pīr ʿAbbās) is a village in Mahru Rural District, Zaz and Mahru District, Aligudarz County, Lorestan Province, Iran. At the 2006 census, its population was 45, in 8 families.
