= Sari Kuh Olya =

Sari Kuh Olya سريکوه عليا
- Village
- Country: Iran
- Province: Lorestan
- County: Aligudarz
- Bakhsh: Zaz and Mahru
- Rural District: Zaz-e Sharqi

Population (2006)
  - Total: 73
- Time zone: UTC+3:30 (IRST)
  - Summer (DST): UTC+4:30 (IRDT)

Sari Kuh Olya (Persian: سريکوه عليا, also Romanized as Sarī Kūh Olyā; also known as Amid Ali (Persian: اميدعلي), also Romanized as Āmīd Alī) is a village in Zaz-e Sharqi Rural District, Zaz and Mahru District, Aligudarz County, Lorestan Province, Iran. At the 2006 census, its population was 73, in 15 families.
