= Derj =

Derj may refer to:

- Derj, Albania
- Derj, Iran
