= Chal Gerd-e Keshtvarzeh =

Chal Gerd-e Keshtvarzeh چالگردكشت ورزه
- Village
- Location within Iran
- Coordinates: 33°12′00″N 49°11′00″E
- Country: Iran
- Province: Lorestan
- County: Aligudarz
- Bakhsh: Zaz and Mahru
- Rural District: Zaz-e Sharqi

Population (2006)
  - Total: 212
- Time zone: UTC+3:30 (IRST)
  - Summer (DST): UTC+4:30 (IRDT)

Chal Gerd-e Keshtvarzeh (Persian: چالگردكشت ورزه, also Romanized as Chāl Gerd-e Keshtvarzeh; also known as Chālgah-e Keshtvarzeh) is a village in Zaz-e Sharqi Rural District, Zaz and Mahru District, Aligudarz County, Lorestan Province, Iran. At the 2006 census, its population was 212, in 32 families.
