= Depeh =

Depeh دپه
- Village
- Location within Iran
- Coordinates: 33°02′00″N 48°54′00″E
- Country: Iran
- Province: Lorestan
- County: Aligudarz
- Bakhsh: Zaz and Mahru
- Rural District: Mahru

Population (2006)
  - Total: 42
- Time zone: UTC+3:30 (IRST)
  - Summer (DST): UTC+4:30 (IRDT)

Depeh (Persian: دپه, also Romanized as Debeh) is a village in Mahru Rural District, Zaz and Mahru District, Aligudarz County, Lorestan Province, Iran. At the 2006 census, its population was 42, in 6 families.
