= Mulish =

Mulish موليش
- Village
- Location within Iran
- Coordinates: 33°03′45″N 48°53′33″E
- Country: Iran
- Province: Lorestan
- County: Aligudarz
- Bakhsh: Zaz and Mahru
- Rural District: Mahru

Population (2006)
  - Total: 61
- Time zone: UTC+3:30 (IRST)
  - Summer (DST): UTC+4:30 (IRDT)

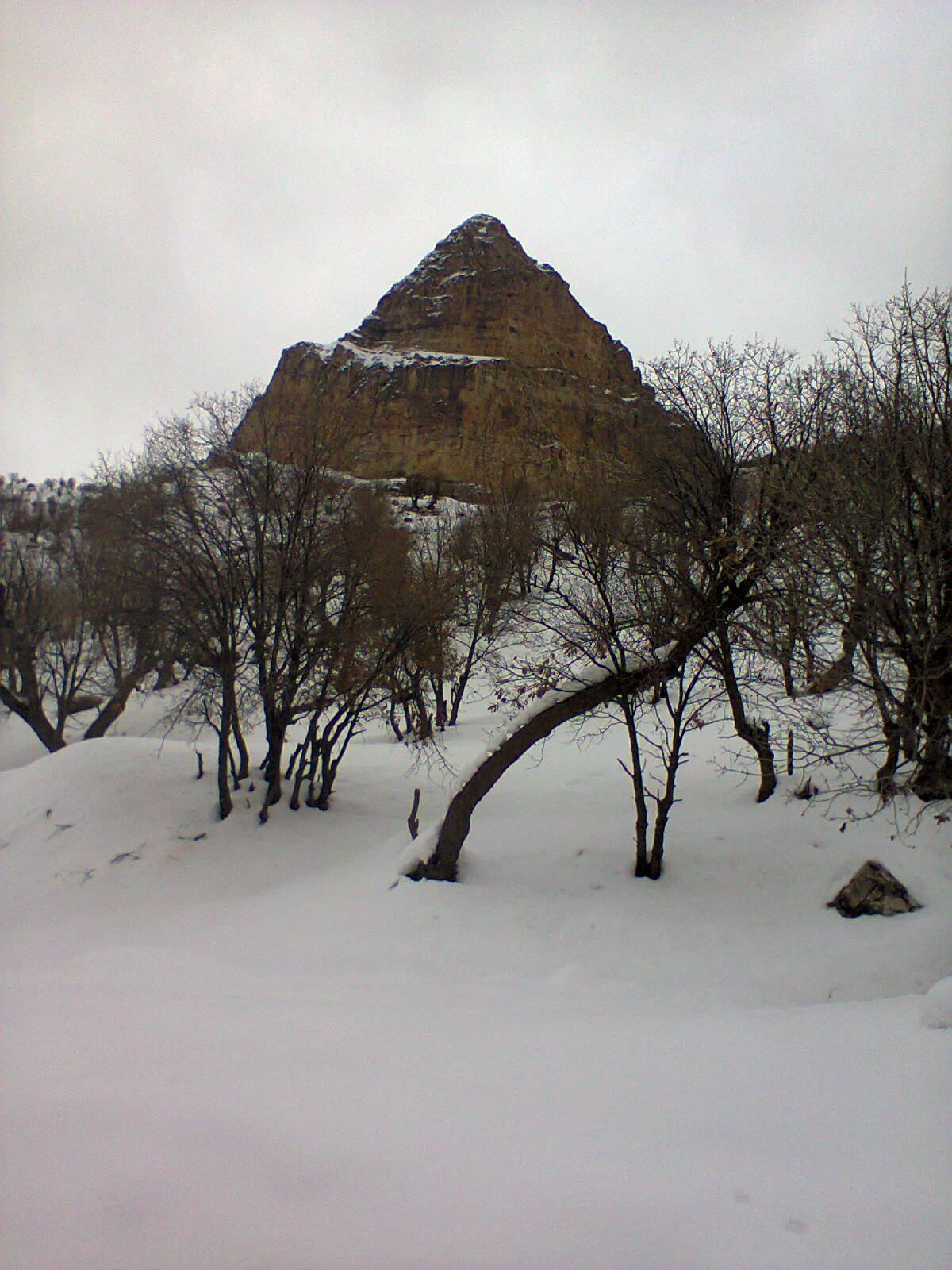
A snowy winter landscape in the village of Mulish, Iran

Mulish (Persian: موليش, also Romanized as Mūlīsh and Mūyesh) is a village in Mahru Rural District, Zaz and Mahru District, Aligudarz County, Lorestan Province, Iran. At the 2006 census, its population was 61, in 13 families.
