= Kigeh Olya =

Kigeh Olya كيگه عليا
- Village
- Location within Iran
- Coordinates: 33°06′36″N 48°45′26″E
- Country: Iran
- Province: Lorestan
- County: Aligudarz
- Bakhsh: Zaz and Mahru
- Rural District: Mahru

Population (2006)
  - Total: 76
- Time zone: UTC+3:30 (IRST)
  - Summer (DST): UTC+4:30 (IRDT)

Kigeh Olya (Persian: كيگه عليا, also Romanized as Kīgeh ʿOlyā; also known as Kīgeh) is a village in Mahru Rural District, Zaz and Mahru District, Aligudarz County, Lorestan Province, Iran. At the 2006 census, its population was 76, in 17 families.
