= Seran =

Seran may refer to:

- Çarshovë, Albania
- Seh Ran Bala, Iran
- Seh Ran Pain, Iran

== See also ==
- Seh Ran (disambiguation)
- Saran (disambiguation)
