= Silavar =

Silavar may refer to:

- Şilavar, Azerbaijan
- Silav, Iran
