= Bard-e Fateh =

Bard-e Fateh بردفاتح
- Village
- Location within Iran
- Coordinates: 33°09′56″N 49°02′24″E
- Country: Iran
- Province: Lorestan
- County: Aligudarz
- Bakhsh: Zaz and Mahru
- Rural District: Zaz-e Gharbi

Population (2006)
  - Total: 49
- Time zone: UTC+3:30 (IRST)
  - Summer (DST): UTC+4:30 (IRDT)

Bard-e Fateh (Persian: بردفاتح, also Romanized as Bard-e Fāteḩ and Bardeh-ye Fāteḩ) is a village in Zaz-e Gharbi Rural District, Zaz and Mahru District, Aligudarz County, Lorestan Province, Iran. At the 2006 census, its population was 49, in 8 families.
