= Shulehabad =

Shulehabad may refer to:

- Shulehabad-e Olya
- Shulehabad-e Sofla
