= Darreh Dang =

Village in Lorestan province, Iran

Darreh Dang Persian: دره دنگ
- Village
- Location within Iran
- Coordinates: 33°16′10″N 49°00′04″E
- Country: Iran
- Province: Lorestan
- County: Aligudarz
- District: Zaz and Mahru
- Rural District: Zaz-e Gharbi

Population (2016)
  - Total: 176
- Time zone: UTC+3:30 (IRST)

Darreh Dang (Persian: دره دنگ) (Note: Also romanized as Darreh-ye Dang) is a village in Zaz-e Gharbi Rural District of Zaz and Mahru District in Aligudarz County, Lorestan province, Iran.

== Demographics ==
=== Population ===
At the time of the 2006 National Census, the village's population was 451 in 67 households. The following census in 2011 counted 368 people in 60 households. The 2016 census measured the population of the village as 176 people in 58 households.
