= Firuzabad, Zaz and Mahru =

Village in Lorestan province, Iran

Firuzabad Persian: فيروزاباد
- Village
- Location within Iran
- Coordinates: 33°09′36″N 49°17′41″E
- Country: Iran
- Province: Lorestan
- County: Aligudarz
- District: Zaz and Mahru
- Rural District: Zaz-e Sharqi

Population (2016)
  - Total: 296
- Time zone: UTC+3:30 (IRST)

Firuzabad (Persian: فيروزاباد) (Note: Also romanized as Fīrūzābād) is a village in Zaz-e Sharqi Rural District (Note: Formerly Zaz Rural District) of Zaz and Mahru District in Aligudarz County, Lorestan province, Iran.

== Demographics ==
=== Population ===
At the time of the 2006 National Census, the village's population was 237 in 35 households. The following census in 2011 counted 175 people in 37 households. The 2016 census measured the population of the village as 296 people in 62 households.
