= Khodadadkosh =

Khodadadkosh may refer to:

- Khodadadkosh-e Sofla
- Khodadadkosh-e Olya
