= Pas Fidaneh =

Village in Lorestan province, Iran

Pas Fidaneh Persian: پاسفيدانه
- Village
- Country: Iran
- Province: Lorestan
- County: Aligudarz
- District: Zaz and Mahru
- Rural District: Mahru

Population (2016)
  - Total: 64
- Time zone: UTC+3:30 (IRST)

Pas Fidaneh (Persian: پاسفيدانه) (Note: Also romanized as Pās Fīdāneh) is a village in Mahru Rural District of Zaz and Mahru District in Aligudarz County, Lorestan province, Iran.

== Demographics ==
=== Population ===
At the time of the 2006 National Census, the village's population was 62 in nine households. The following census in 2011 counted 52 people in eight households. The 2016 census measured the population of the village as 64 people in 13 households.
