= Kamar Gap =

Village in Lorestan province, Iran

Kamar Gap Persian: كمرگپ
- Village
- Location within Iran
- Coordinates: 33°14′34″N 49°02′27″E
- Country: Iran
- Province: Lorestan
- County: Aligudarz
- District: Zaz and Mahru
- Rural District: Zaz-e Gharbi

Population (2016)
  - Total: 216
- Time zone: UTC+3:30 (IRST)

Kamar Gap (Persian: كمرگپ) (Note: Also known as Kamar Bozorg) is a village in Zaz-e Gharbi Rural District of Zaz and Mahru District in Aligudarz County, Lorestan province, Iran.

== Demographics ==
=== Population ===
At the time of the 2006 National Census, the village's population was 254 in 44 households. The following census in 2011 counted 276 people in 50 households. The 2016 census measured the population of the village as 216 people in 50 households.
