= Sheykhan-e Davud Khuni =

Village in Lorestan province, Iran

Sheykhan-e Davud Khuni Persian: شيخان داودخوني
- Village
- Location within Iran
- Coordinates: 33°13′49″N 49°06′44″E
- Country: Iran
- Province: Lorestan
- County: Aligudarz
- District: Zaz and Mahru
- Rural District: Zaz-e Sharqi

Population (2016)
  - Total: 253
- Time zone: UTC+3:30 (IRST)

Sheykhan-e Davud Khuni (Persian: شيخان داودخوني) (Note: Also romanized as Sheykhān-e Dāvūd Khūnī; also known as Sheykhān-e Dāvūd Khūnī-ye ‘Olyā and Sheykhān-e ‘Olyā) is a village in Zaz-e Sharqi Rural District (Note: Formerly Zaz Rural District) of Zaz and Mahru District in Aligudarz County, Lorestan province, Iran.

== Demographics ==
=== Population ===
At the time of the 2006 National Census, the village's population was 379 in 65 households. The following census in 2011 counted 335 people in 72 households. The 2016 census measured the population of the village as 253 people in 58 households.
