= Sartang-e Barzeh =

Village in Lorestan province, Iran

Sartang-e Barzeh Persian: سرتنگ برزه
- Village
- Location within Iran
- Coordinates: 33°11′04″N 48°56′27″E
- Country: Iran
- Province: Lorestan
- County: Aligudarz
- District: Zaz and Mahru
- Rural District: Zaz-e Gharbi

Population (2016)
  - Total: 224
- Time zone: UTC+3:30 (IRST)

Sartang-e Barzeh (Persian: سرتنگ برزه) (Note: Also known as Sar-e Tang) is a village in, and the capital of, Zaz-e Gharbi Rural District in Zaz and Mahru District of Aligudarz County, Lorestan province, Iran.

== Demographics ==
=== Population ===
At the time of the 2006 National Census, the village's population was 218 in 45 households. The following census in 2011 counted 227 people in 50 households. The 2016 census measured the population of the village as 224 people in 54 households, the most populous in its rural district.
