= Shah Makan-e Pain =

Village in Lorestan province, Iran

Shah Makan-e Pain Persian: شاه مکان پايين
- Village
- Location within Iran
- Country: Iran
- Province: Lorestan
- County: Aligudarz
- District: Zaz and Mahru
- Rural District: Zaz-e Sharqi

Population (2016)
  - Total: 190
- Time zone: UTC+3:30 (IRST)

Shah Makan-e Pain (Persian: شاه مکان پايين) (Note: Also romanized as Shāh Makān-e Pā’īn; formerly known as Shah Makan (شاه مكان), also romanized as Shāh Makān; also known as Shāh Makān-e Bālā, Shāh Makān-e ‘Olyā, and Shāmkān-e ‘Olyā) is a village in Zaz-e Sharqi Rural District (Note: Formerly Zaz Rural District) of Zaz and Mahru District in Aligudarz County, Lorestan province, Iran.

== Demographics ==
=== Population ===
At the time of the 2006 National Census, the village's population, as Shah Makan, was 300 in 56 households. The following census in 2011 counted 143 people in 30 households, by which time the village was listed as Shah Makan-e Pain. The 2016 census measured the population of the village as 190 people in 68 households.
