= Sar Qaleh, Zaz-e Gharbi =

Village in Lorestan province, Iran

Sar Qaleh Persian: سرقلعه
- Village
- Location within Iran
- Coordinates: 33°15′05″N 48°58′01″E
- Country: Iran
- Province: Lorestan
- County: Aligudarz
- District: Zaz and Mahru
- Rural District: Zaz-e Gharbi

Population (2016)
  - Total: 68
- Time zone: UTC+3:30 (IRST)

Sar Qaleh (Persian: سرقلعه) (Note: Also romanized as Sar Qal‘eh) is a village in Zaz-e Gharbi Rural District of Zaz and Mahru District in Aligudarz County, Lorestan province, Iran.

== Demographics ==
=== Population ===
At the time of the 2006 National Census, the village's population was 105 in 19 households. The following census in 2011 counted 91 people in 16 households. The 2016 census measured the population of the village as 68 people in 14 households.
