= Hayyeh =

Village in Lorestan province, Iran

Hayyeh Persian: حيه
- Village
- Location within Iran
- Coordinates: 33°14′51″N 48°59′26″E
- Country: Iran
- Province: Lorestan
- County: Aligudarz
- District: Zaz and Mahru
- Rural District: Zaz-e Gharbi

Population (2016)
  - Total: 90
- Time zone: UTC+3:30 (IRST)

Hayyeh (Persian: حيه) (Note: Also romanized as Hayeh and Ḩayyeh; also known as Hayah) is a village in Zaz-e Gharbi Rural District of Zaz and Mahru District in Aligudarz County, Lorestan province, Iran.

== Demographics ==
=== Population ===
At the time of the 2006 National Census, the village's population was 61 in 12 households. The following census in 2011 counted 66 people in 12 households. The 2016 census measured the population of the village as 90 people in 27 households.
