= Panbeh Kar, Zaz and Mahru =

Village in Lorestan province, Iran

Panbeh Kar Persian: پنبه كار
- Village
- Country: Iran
- Province: Lorestan
- County: Aligudarz
- District: Zaz and Mahru
- Rural District: Mahru

Population (2016)
  - Total: 82
- Time zone: UTC+3:30 (IRST)

Panbeh Kar (Persian: پنبه كار) (Note: Also romanized as Panbeh Kār; also known as Hoseynabad (حسين آباد) and Panbeh Kar-e Darreh Bagh (پنبه کار دره باغ)) is a village in Mahru Rural District of Zaz and Mahru District in Aligudarz County, Lorestan province, Iran.

== Demographics ==
=== Population ===
At the time of the 2006 National Census, the village's population was 23 in four households. The following census in 2011 counted 59 people in 13 households. The 2016 census measured the population of the village as 82 people in 19 households.
