= Kodivar =

Village in Lorestan province, Iran

Kodivar Persian: كديور
- Village
- Location within Iran
- Coordinates: 33°03′23″N 49°03′31″E
- Country: Iran
- Province: Lorestan
- County: Aligudarz
- District: Zaz and Mahru
- Rural District: Zaz-e Sharqi

Population (2016)
  - Total: 250
- Time zone: UTC+3:30 (IRST)

Kodivar (Persian: كديور) (Note: Also romanized as Kodīvar) is a village in Zaz-e Sharqi Rural District (Note: Formerly Zaz Rural District) of Zaz and Mahru District in Aligudarz County, Lorestan province, Iran.

== Demographics ==
=== Population ===
At the time of the 2006 National Census, the village's population was 131 in 22 households. The following census in 2011 counted 161 people in 34 households. The 2016 census measured the population of the village as 250 people in 50 households.
