= Ardesi =

Village in Lorestan province, Iran

Ardesi Persian: اردسي
- Village
- Location within Iran
- Country: Iran
- Province: Lorestan
- County: Aligudarz
- District: Zaz and Mahru
- Rural District: Zaz-e Gharbi

Population (2016)
  - Total: 69
- Time zone: UTC+3:30 (IRST)

Ardesi (Persian: اردسي) (Note: Also romanized as Ardesī) is a village in Zaz-e Gharbi Rural District of Zaz and Mahru District in Aligudarz County, Lorestan province, Iran.

== Demographics ==
=== Population ===
At the time of the 2006 National Census, the village's population was 95 in 21 households. The following census in 2011 counted 89 people in 19 households. The 2016 census measured the population of the village as 69 people in 15 households.
