= Farengeh =

Village in Lorestan province, Iran

Farengeh Persian: فرنگه
- Village
- Country: Iran
- Province: Lorestan
- County: Aligudarz
- District: Zaz and Mahru
- Rural District: Mahru

Population (2016)
  - Total: 88
- Time zone: UTC+3:30 (IRST)

Farengeh (Persian: فرنگه) is a village in Mahru Rural District of Zaz and Mahru District in Aligudarz County, Lorestan province, Iran.

== Demographics ==
=== Population ===
At the time of the 2006 National Census, the village's population was 40 in five households. The following census in 2011 counted 54 people in 11 households. The 2016 census measured the population of the village as 88 people in 17 households.
