= Goli Chas =

Village in Lorestan province, Iran

Goli Chas Persian: گلي چاس
- Village
- Location within Iran
- Coordinates: 33°00′32″N 49°16′10″E
- Country: Iran
- Province: Lorestan
- County: Aligudarz
- District: Zaz and Mahru
- Rural District: Zaz-e Sharqi

Population (2016)
  - Total: 204
- Time zone: UTC+3:30 (IRST)

Goli Chas (Persian: گلي چاس) (Note: Also romanized as Golī Chās and Golīchās) is a village in Zaz-e Sharqi Rural District (Note: Formerly Zaz Rural District) of Zaz and Mahru District in Aligudarz County, Lorestan province, Iran.

== Demographics ==
=== Population ===
At the time of the 2006 National Census, the village's population was 235 in 46 households. The following census in 2011 counted 245 people in 54 households. The 2016 census measured the population of the village as 204 people in 46 households.
