= Shah Makan-e Bala, Iran =

Village in Lorestan province, Iran

Shah Makan-e Bala Persian: شاه مکان بالا
- Village
- Location within Iran
- Coordinates: 33°12′58″N 49°12′11″E
- Country: Iran
- Province: Lorestan
- County: Aligudarz
- District: Zaz and Mahru
- Rural District: Zaz-e Sharqi

Population (2016)
  - Total: 173
- Time zone: UTC+3:30 (IRST)

Shah Makan-e Bala (Persian: شاه مكان صفر) (Note: Also romanized as Shāh Makān-e Bālā; formerly known as Shah Makan-e Sefer (شاه مكان صفر), also romanized as Shāh Makān-e Sefer; also known as Shāh Makān-e Soflá and Shāmkān-e Soflá) is a village in Zaz-e Sharqi Rural District (Note: Formerly Zaz Rural District) of Zaz and Mahru District in Aligudarz County, Lorestan province, Iran.

== Demographics ==
=== Population ===
At the time of the 2006 National Census, the village's population, as Shah Makan-e Sefer, was 300 in 56 households. The following census in 2011 counted 143 people in 30 households, by which time the village was listed as Shah Makan-e Bala. The 2016 census measured the population of the village as 190 people in 68 households.
