= Mahi, Iran =

Village in Lorestan province, Iran

Mahi Persian: ماهي
- Village
- Country: Iran
- Province: Lorestan
- County: Aligudarz
- District: Zaz and Mahru
- Rural District: Mahru

Population (2016)
  - Total: 93
- Time zone: UTC+3:30 (IRST)

Mahi (Persian: ماهي) (Note: Also romanized as Māhī) is a village in Mahru Rural District of Zaz and Mahru District in Aligudarz County, Lorestan province, Iran.

== Demographics ==
=== Population ===
At the time of the 2006 National Census, the village's population was 104 in 20 households. The following census in 2011 counted 94 people in 19 households. The 2016 census measured the population of the village as 93 people in 26 households.
