= Galeh Yar =

Village in Lorestan province, Iran

Galeh Yar Persian: گله يار
- Village
- Location within Iran
- Coordinates: 33°00′27″N 49°10′32″E
- Country: Iran
- Province: Lorestan
- County: Aligudarz
- District: Zaz and Mahru
- Rural District: Zaz-e Sharqi

Population (2016)
  - Total: 233
- Time zone: UTC+3:30 (IRST)

Galeh Yar (Persian: گله يار) (Note: Also romanized as Galeh Yār; also known as Galīār, Gelīār, and Geleyār) is a village in Zaz-e Sharqi Rural District (Note: Formerly Zaz Rural District) of Zaz and Mahru District in Aligudarz County, Lorestan province, Iran.

== Demographics ==
=== Population ===
At the time of the 2006 National Census, the village's population was 260 in 50 households. The following census in 2011 counted 228 people in 48 households. The 2016 census measured the population of the village as 233 people in 54 households.
