= Marg Sar, Lorestan =

Village in Lorestan province, Iran

Marg Sar Persian: مرگسر
- Village
- Location within Iran
- Coordinates: 33°02′49″N 48°55′25″E
- Country: Iran
- Province: Lorestan
- County: Aligudarz
- District: Zaz and Mahru
- Rural District: Mahru

Population (2016)
  - Total: 379
- Time zone: UTC+3:30 (IRST)

Marg Sar (Persian: مرگسر) (Note: Also romanized as Marg-e Sar, and Marg Sar; also known as Margeh Sar and Qal‘eh-ye Margsar) is a village in, and the capital of, Mahru Rural District in Zaz and Mahru District of Aligudarz County, Lorestan province, Iran.

== Demographics ==
=== Population ===
At the time of the 2006 National Census, the village's population was 398 in 70 households. The following census in 2011 counted 471 people in 83 households. The 2016 census measured the population of the village as 379 people in 87 households, the most populous in its rural district.
