= Qadiyan, Iran =

City in Luristan, Iran

Qadiyan قاديان
- City
- Location within Iran
- Coordinates: 33°03′00″N 48°58′24″E
- Country: Iran
- Province: Luristan
- County: Aligudarz
- District: Zazwamahru

Population (2006)
  - Total: 389
- Time zone: UTC+3:30 (IRST)
  - Summer (DST): UTC+4:30 (IRDT)

Qadiyan (Persian: قاديان, romanized: Qādiyān) is a city in Zazwamahru District, Aligudarz County, Luristan province, Iran. At the 2006 census, its population was recorded 389.
