= Sar Qaleh, Mahru =

Village in Lorestan province, Iran

Sar Qaleh Persian: سرقلعه
- Village
- Location within Iran
- Country: Iran
- Province: Lorestan
- County: Aligudarz
- District: Zaz and Mahru
- Rural District: Mahru

Population (2016)
  - Total: 127
- Time zone: UTC+3:30 (IRST)

Sar Qaleh (Persian: سرقلعه) (Note: Also romanized as Sar Qal‘eh; also known as Sar Qalā) is a village in Mahru Rural District of Zaz and Mahru District in Aligudarz County, Lorestan province, Iran.

== Demographics ==
=== Population ===
At the time of the 2006 National Census, the village's population was 199 in 31 households. The following census in 2011 counted 146 people in 28 households. The 2016 census measured the population of the village as 127 people in 28 households.
