= Pir Emam =

Village in Lorestan province, Iran

Pir Emam Persian: پيرامام
- Village
- Location within Iran
- Coordinates: 33°10′03″N 49°07′42″E
- Country: Iran
- Province: Lorestan
- County: Aligudarz
- District: Zaz and Mahru
- Rural District: Zaz-e Sharqi

Population (2016)
  - Total: 580
- Time zone: UTC+3:30 (IRST)

Pir Emam (Persian: پيرامام) (Note: Also romanized as Pīr Emām and Pīremām) is a village in Zaz-e Sharqi Rural District (Note: Formerly Zaz Rural District) of Zaz and Mahru District in Aligudarz County, Lorestan province, Iran.

== Demographics ==
=== Population ===
At the time of the 2006 National Census, the village's population was 503 in 95 households. The following census in 2011 counted 440 people in 98 households. The 2016 census measured the population of the village as 580 people in 149 households, the most populous in its rural district.
