= Banging =

Banging may refer to:

- Slang for sexual intercourse
- Slang for attractive, esp. physically attractive
- Intravenous drug use
- The act of percussion upon surfaces
- Kinds of "knocking" or loud recurring sounds such as engine knocking
- Banging pots, a form of protest

== See also ==
- Bang (disambiguation)
- Bangin', an album by English rock band The Outfield.
