= Lyle Greenfield =

Lyle John Greenfield (born July 30, 1947) is an American music production executive and past president of the national board of theAssociation of Music Producers.

== Early life ==
Greenfield was born in Rochester, New York. He attended St. Margaret Mary grammar school, graduated from Irondequoit High School in 1965; graduated Bowling Green University (Ohio) in 1969 after which he moved to New York City, NY.

== Career ==
Greenfield is the founder of Bang, a New York-based music production company.

In 1969, Greenfield began his career as a copywriter at JWT in New York. He remained at the agency until 1979, creating advertisements for Ford and other accounts. In that same year, he purchased seventy-four acres of land in Bridgehampton, NY, planting a small vineyard of primarily Chardonnay vines. (On that site, Greenfield built The Bridgehampton Winery in 1982 and produced the first varietal wines from the South Fork of Long Island until selling the enterprise to Peter Carroll of Lenz Winery in 1995. In 1980 he joined Compton Advertising (which was subsequently acquired by Saatchi & Saatchi) as a senior vice president and creative director on the Jeep account.

After four years he left the ad agency business and joined a New York music production company, Tom Anthony Music. Four years later, in 1989, Greenfield started Bang Music, sharing studio and office space with Caliope Productions in Midtown Manhattan. He moved the company to 16 West 18th Street in New York's Flatiron District in 1993.

In June 2004 Greenfield formed a “527” political organization, This Vote Counts, for the purpose of producing and airing television advertisements for the Democratic Presidential Campaign.

In 2013 Greenfield helped organize the AMP Awards for Music and Sound. The inaugural ceremony, held in New York City, attracted over 400 professionals from the music, advertising and entertainment industries.

In 2014 he began writing a monthly column called "Earwitness" for the online production magazine SHOOT.

== Present ==
In 2010 Greenfield married Mary Jane Hantz, a teacher and administrator in the dual-language program at Southampton Elementary in Southampton, NY. The couple resides in Amagansett on eastern Long Island and in Manhattan. He is a frequent contributor to the Commentary section of The East Hampton Star newspaper.
