= Bang (company) =

Music and sound production company

BANG
- Company type: Independent
- Industry: Advertising, music, production, audio post production
- Founded: 1989
- Headquarters: New York City, New York, United States
- Area served: Worldwide
- Key people: Brian Jones; Brad Stratton; Lyle Greenfield; Timo Elliston; Paul Vītolinš; Nick Cipriano; Steve Walsh; Viliam Béreš; Shelby Comstock Britten
- Website: www.bangworld.com

BANG is a music and audio post production company based in New York City, with office and studios in Prague, which creates original music and provides music supervision, sound design and audio production services for advertising, entertainment and interactive media.

== History ==
BANG was founded in New York City in January 1989 by former advertising agency creative director Lyle Greenfield. The company was first housed in the studios of hip-hop recording facility, Calliope Productions, where artists such as De La Soul, Queen Latifah, Black Sheep, A Tribe Called Quest, Brand New Heavies and Stereo MCs had recorded their early records.

== 1990s ==
In 1993, BANG left Calliope and established its own studios in a two-story brick building in New York's historic Flatiron District. The building, once a horse stable, was converted into the company's recording and office facilities. BANG's early commercial work included songs and scores for Heineken, Sprite, Sony, Mercedes-Benz, KFC International and Ford.

In the mid-1990s BANG formed an independent label imprint, Notorious Records, releasing several dance singles including a remake of Phil Collins’ iconic hit "In The Air Tonight". Billboard praised the recording, calling it "a solid job of linking the song's darkly intense lyrics with a firm house beat and ethereal keyboard."

== Industry activism ==
In 1997, Lyle Greenfield joined a group of music production companies in New York City in discussions concerning fair business practices for music creators in the commercial and entertainment industries. A new trade association was formed, with Greenfield suggesting its moniker - AMP: The Association of Music Producers. (AMP). He was voted AMP's first President and served in that position on the association's national board for two more terms.

Later in 1997, musician Jane Mangini joined the company's roster, scoring dozens of commercials and recording an album of original compositions at BANG's studios under the artist name O'2L. While at BANG she signed a record deal with Peak Records in Los Angeles and also became a touring keyboardist for the Trans-Siberian Orchestra.

== 2000s ==
In mid-2000, Brian Jones joined BANG as senior producer and composer, leaving his position at William Morris Agency in New York.

Sara Iversen (née Russo) joined the company as a senior producer and marketing strategist in 2000. She had worked previously for advertising agencies, first as account executive at DeVito/Verdi, then at Lowe Worldwide on the GMC business.

In 2001, Espen Noreger, best known as the drummer for Norwegian rock band The Getaway People, joined BANG as a composer.

In 2004 Jones was made a full partner in Bang Music. In the years that followed his writing credits expanded beyond commercial to include TV programs and series on NBC, Bravo, TLC, Sundance Film Festival, CBS, Spike, Lifetime, ESPN and E! as well as dozens of commercial spots for National brands.

In early 2008 Brad Stratton joined BANG as Executive Producer and partner. Previously, Stratton had helped establish Sound Lounge Music in New York, was a senior producer at Fluid Post and was head of music production at D’Arcy Advertising in New York.

== 2010–present ==
In 2010, Jones was commissioned as music supervisor for the premiere season of the CBS drama Blue Bloods. At the same time, BANG continued to expand its work in film and interactive audio production with several films featured at the Sundance and Tribeca Film Festivals as well as over 50 games and apps for The Walt Disney Company. BANG's commercial output continued to grow with original music scores for national and international brands including Mercedes-Benz, Jaguar, Victoria's Secret, Google, McDonald's, Cisco, Samsonite, L'Oreal, CoverGirl, AT&T, American Express, Folgers, Reese's, Guinness, MLB, NFL and others.

Composer-musician Timo Elliston joined BANG in 2012. His formal education and experience anticipated the company's continued push into longer-form video and film content.

== Spotify Sessions ==
In 2012, Senior Engineer Paul Vītolinš joined BANG, supporting the company's increasing work in audio post production. In addition, Vītolinš spearheaded BANG's work with music streaming service, Spotify, recording and mixing live artist sessions in New York City and in tour locations, including at the 2013-2016 SXSW Festivals. By 2017 the company had mixed over 260 live artist session for Spotify, including Kendrick Lamar, John Legend, Jackson Browne, Nate Ruess, Jason Derulo, Run The Jewels, Metallica, Willie Nelson, Passion Pit, Kacey Musgraves, Green Day, and Leon Bridges. BANG's mixing and mastering work for Spotify has continued with Spotify's video content.

In 2013, Nick Cipriano joined the company, also in the capacity of Senior Engineer, providing additional support for the Spotify Sessions mixes, commercial recordings, record mixes, and mastering. In January of the same year, Jones was named President of BANG, succeeding its founder in that position for the first time.

== AMP Awards for Music and Sound debuts ==
In 2013, Greenfield, along with other AMP Board members, created the AMP Awards for Music and Sound, which he had championed among member companies for several years. The AMP Awards debuted on May 7 in New York City and has become the only industry event in the U.S. honoring excellence in music for advertising, branding and media. In 2015, Greenfield began writing a regular column for SHOOTonline about music and popular culture under the heading Earwitness.

== BANG Europe opens in Prague ==
In 2015, at the initiative of Stratton, who’d lived and worked in the former Czech Republic in the mid 1990s, BANG opened an office and recording studio in Prague to service commercial music and audio post projects originating in the EU markets. Situated within the walls of Eallin Motion Arts, a modern animation and mixed media production company, partners in the BANG EU operation are composer-musician-producers Viliam Béreš and Steve Walsh. In October, Shelby Comstock Britten joined BANG in New York as studio and production manager, coordinating operations between both the music and audio post divisions and New York-Prague.

== BANG Audio Post formed ==
In 2016 BANG formalized its growing business in the area of audio post production by forming a discrete division, BANG Audio Post, with engineers Vītolinš and Cipriano as partners and VPs and Stratton as President. Titles in post production at BANG Audio Post include Season 9 of Ink Master and Ink Master Angels for Spike; Finding Escobar’s Millions, Discovery Channel; I Love You But I Lied, Lifetime; 73 Questions, Vogue; Landmark: Metallica, Spotify.

In May 2017, Elliston and Jones completed the original music score for National Geographic’s 6-part documentary Year Million. In September BANG’s work for agency Digitas and client Accenture Strategy in producing a live orchestral performance of Symphonologie at the Louvre in Paris was awarded a Silver Clio.
