= Shulabad, Iran =

City in Lorestan province, Iran

Shulabad شول‌آباد
- City
- Location within Iran
- Coordinates: 33°11′07″N 49°11′25″E
- Country: Iran
- Province: Lorestan
- County: Aligudarz
- District: Zaz and Mahru
- Established as a city: 2010

Population (2016)
  - Total: 1,531
- Time zone: UTC+3:30 (IRST)

Shulabad (Persian: شول‌آباد) (Note: Formerly Shulabad-e Sofla (شول‌آباد سفلی), also known as Shulehabad-e Soflā, also romanized as Shūlehābād-e Soflā) is a city in, and the capital of, Zaz and Mahru District of Aligudarz County, Lorestan province, Iran. It also serves as the administrative center for Zaz-e Sharqi Rural District. (Note: Formerly Zaz Rural District)

== Demographics ==
=== Population ===
At the time of the 2006 National Census, the population was 484 in 93 households, when it was the village of Shulabad-e Sofla in Zaz-e Sharqi Rural District. The following census in 2011 counted 1,553 people in 336 households. Shulabad-e Sofla, after having merged with the villages of Asar, Del Suran, Derakht Chaman, Khodadadkosh-e Olya, Khodadadkosh-e Sofla, Sarlak, and Shulabad-e Olya, was converted to a city and renamed Shulabad. The 2016 census measured the population of the city as 1,531 people in 422 households.
