= Seh Ran Bala =

Village in Lorestan province, Iran

Seh Ran Bala Persian: سه ران بالا
- Village
- Location within Iran
- Country: Iran
- Province: Lorestan
- County: Aligudarz
- District: Zaz and Mahru
- Rural District: Mahru

Population (2016)
  - Total: Below reporting threshold
- Time zone: UTC+3:30 (IRST)

Seh Ran Bala (Persian: سه ران بالا) (Note: Also romanized as Seh Rān Bālā; also known as Sarān-e Bālā, Sarān-e ‘Olyā, and Serān) is a village in Mahru Rural District of Zaz and Mahru District in Aligudarz County, Lorestan province, Iran.

== Demographics ==
=== Population ===
At the time of the 2006 National Census, the village's population was 35 in five households. The following census in 2011 counted 24 people in five households. The 2016 census measured the population of the village as below the reporting threshold.
