= Seh Ran Pain =

Village in Lorestan province, Iran

Seh Ran Pain Persian: سه ران پايين
- Village
- Location within Iran
- Coordinates: 33°06′20″N 48°49′00″E
- Country: Iran
- Province: Lorestan
- County: Aligudarz
- District: Zaz and Mahru
- Rural District: Mahru

Population (2016)
  - Total: 134
- Time zone: UTC+3:30 (IRST)

Seh Ran Pain (Persian: سه ران پايين) (Note: Also romanized as Seh Rān Pā'īn; also known as Sarān-e Pā’īn, Sarān-e Soflá, and Serān) is a village in Mahru Rural District of Zaz and Mahru District in Aligudarz County, Lorestan province, Iran.

== Demographics ==
=== Population ===
At the time of the 2006 National Census, the village's population was 117 in 19 households. The following census in 2011 counted 69 people in 14 households. The 2016 census measured the population of the village as 134 people in 32 households.
