= You Make It Move =

1965 single by Dave Dee, Dozy, Beaky, Mick & Tich

- Cover of the single released in the Netherlands

Single by Dave Dee, Dozy, Beaky, Mick & Tich

from the album If Music Be the Food of Love... Prepare for Indigestion
- B-side: "I Can't Stop"
- Released: 5 November 1965
- Recorded: 21 September 1965
- Studio: Philips (London)
- Genre: Rock; beat
- Length: 2:43
- Label: Fontana
- Songwriter(s): Ken Howard; Alan Blaikley
- Producer(s): Steve Rowland

Dave Dee, Dozy, Beaky, Mick & Tich singles chronology
"All I Want" (1965)	"You Make It Move" (1965)	"Hold Tight!" (1966)

"You Make It Move" is a song by Dave Dee, Dozy, Beaky, Mick & Tich, released as a single in November 1965. It was the group's first charting single, peaking at number 26 on the UK Singles Chart.

== Release ==
"You Make It Move" was the third single released by the group and it was the first to be produced by Steve Rowland, an American actor, who after living in Spain moved to England without a visa and was hired by Fontana Records A&R manager Jack Baverstock as a producer. "You Make It Move" features Tich playing a Tone Bender fuzz guitar, which was the second one to be recorded with in the UK after Jeff Beck used it on the Yardbirds' "Heart Full of Soul".

It was released with the B-side "I Can't Stop", which had previously been recorded by the Honeycombs in 1964. Like the A-side, "I Can't Stop" was written by their managers Ken Howard and Alan Blaikley, who went to write the majority of Dave Dee, Dozy, Beaky, Mick and Tich's singles. The single was released in Europe (namely the Netherlands, Norway and Italy) and the US in January 1966. However, the US release featured a different B-side, "No Time", which had been released as the group's debut single in January 1965. It wasn't featured on the group's debut album Dave Dee, Dozy, Beaky, Mick & Tich, released in June 1966, but was included on their second album If Music Be the Food of Love... Prepare for Indigestion, released in November 1966.

As a relatively unknown group, getting radio airplay was a problem. However, Howard and Blaikley devised a plan to solve this. They threw a party at Howard's home in Swiss Cottage, London, and invited "virtually every influential media figure in the music business". Halfway threw the evening, the two took all the guests to Burton's Ballroom in Uxbridge, where they watched the climax of a Dave Dee, Dozy, Beaky, Mick and Tich concert. Then later on, "a semi-inebriated Radio London executive was heard to exclaim: ‘If they sound as good on record tomorrow as they did tonight I’ll make them my pick of the week’". The executive then played "You Make It Move" the following morning and it soon entered the national radio station's Fab 40 chart. In December 1965, Dave Dee wrote a letter to Ben Toney, the programme director for Radio London, thanking him for his help with "You Make It Move".

Despite its release in November, "You Make It Move" didn't enter the UK Singles Chart until the final week of December and peaked at number 26 in the final week of January 1966. "You Make It Move" also charted on other music paper charts, notably the New Musical Express chart, on which it peaked at number 19. As for radio charts, it peaked at number 10 on the Radio Caroline Countdown 60 and number 4 on the Radio London Fab 40.

== Reception ==
In Record Mirror, "You Make It Move" was described as "an all-happening slice of modern-styled pop" with "great big backing sounds behind what sounds like a massed vocal front line. Certainly good enough for the charts, with plenty excitement". Reviewed in Melody Maker: "Written by Ken Howard and Alan Blaikley members of the partnership which gave the Honeycombs their No.1 ‘Have I the Right’. They use the similar heavy beat but with fuzz box guitar, and "saloon bar" piano. These boys have an excellent act – which might help the sales on a well done record".

Reviewed in Billboard, it was described as a "hard driving rocker loaded with teen dance appeal [which] has all the earmarks of a smash in the U.S". Cash Box described the song as "a rhythmic romantic pounder about a love-sick guy who really wants his ex-gal to return to him".

== Track listing ==
7": Fontana / TF 630

1. "You Make It Move" – 2:43
2. "I Can't Stop" – 2:16

7": Fontana / F-1537 (US)

1. "You Make It Move" – 2:50
2. "No Time" – 2:10

== Charts ==
Chart (1966)	Peak position
UK Singles (OCC)	26
UK Disc Top 30	24
UK Melody Maker Pop 50	26
UK New Musical Express Top 30	19
