= Drama teaching techniques =

There are many methods for teaching drama. Each strategy involves varying levels of student participation.

== Drama games ==
Drama games, activities and exercises are often used to introduce students to drama. These activities tend to be less intrusive and are highly participatory (e.g. Bang).

There are several books that have been written on using drama games. Games for Actors and Non-Actors by Augusto Boal includes writings on his life work as well as hundreds of games. There are also smaller books. For example, Drama Games by Bernie Warren is an excellent pocket book for someone looking to try drama games for the first time.

== Choral speaking ==
Choral dramatization involves students reading aloud by assigning parts to each group member, and can use texts such as rhymes, poetry and picture books. Students can experiment with voice, sound gesture and movement.

== Tableaux ==
Tableaux involve students creating visual pictures with their bodies, emphasizing key details and relationships. Tableaux are frozen scenes and usually involve at least three levels. Students focus on a focal point, facial expressions, and body language. This technique is useful for maturing participants' presentational skills as well as audience skills.

== Improvisation ==
Improvisation is the practice of acting and reacting, of making and creating, in the moment and in response to the stimulus of one's immediate environment. Improvisation can be a great introduction to role playing. Students focus on position, expression and creativity in their impromptu skits.

== Role playing ==
Role playing allows students to play a character in a real or imaginary situation. One of the simplest forms is where "the student plays himself faced with an imaginary situation". Other strategies have students playing real-life or imaginary characters in a variety of contexts. Role play can be used throughout many areas of the curriculum, especially history and language arts to support and strengthen understanding of content. Below is a list of some common role-play strategies.

- Reenactment: Students perform scenes from a historical time period or a scene in a story. "An enactment may be cast in the past, the present, or the future, but always happens in the 'now of time'". This strategy encourages students to interact with a text and challenges them to take on the perspective of a character.
- Extended role play: Students may create the scene that takes place before or after a story or scene. This strategy helps students to predict and theorize about cause and effect.
- Hotseat: The student is interviewed in character. By putting the character from a scene, event or story on the "stand", students can further explore their understanding of the content. Other students in the class prepare questions that explore the character and their conflicts. Students are encouraged to write open-ended questions. Teachers may wish to model hotseating first by acting as the character in the role. Also, the person in the hotseat may have a couple of students who act as their "brain". They are there to help answer questions if the person on the hotseat needs them. There are many variations available for this strategy.
- Teacher In Role: This strategy is key to involving teacher participation and can take many forms. The teacher may take on the role of a character or figure from the event, scene or story. The primary objective is to allow students to ask questions and help discover answers to any unresolved issues. The teacher may also choose to immerse themselves in the scene and take on a role while interacting with other characters. The primary role in this situation is to further the evolving drama.
- Expert panel: Students themselves become an expert. In order to prepare for this role students must determine what an expert in the area might know. This works well in history or when focusing on broader issues/topics in literature. This strategy can unfold by having students meet as a group of experts or by having students meet in pairs in an interview.
- Writing in role: A variation on the above strategies, students may also write in character. Often they are asked to imagine themselves as a real or fictitious character in a particular state or situation. Writing in role can take on many forms including a journal, letter, monologue or newspaper article. This is not meant to be a summary of the story, but instead a further exploration of the character and their interaction with events.

== See also ==
- Applied Drama

== Sources ==
- Swartz, Larry (1995). Drama Themes. Portsmouth, NH: Heinemann Educational Books. ISBN 1-55138-052-8.
- Tarlington & Verriour (1991). Role Drama. Portsmouth, NH: Heinemann Educational Books. ISBN 0-921217-67-6.
- Wilheim, Jeffrey D. (2002). Action Strategies for Deepening Comprehension. New York, NY: Scholastic Professional Books. ISBN 0-439-21857-8..
- "Drama Assessment: Saskatchewan". November 27, 2012. Archived from the original on November 27, 2012.
- "Ontario Curriculum", Ontario Ministry of Education
- "Shakespeare in the Classroom". May 12, 2013. Archived from the original on 2013-05-12.
- Shakespeare in the Classroom

== External sources ==
- The Far Games Educational drama and improvisation games
- Creative Drama educational resource
- The Council of Ontario Drama and Dance Educators Resources, lessons and articles on drama in education.
- Drama Toolkit Drama games, strategies, schemes and resources.
