= Hideaway (Dave Dee, Dozy, Beaky, Mick & Tich song) =

1966 single by Dave Dee, Dozy, Beaky, Mick & Tich

- Cover of the single released in the Netherlands

Single by Dave Dee, Dozy, Beaky, Mick & Tich

from the album If Music Be the Food of Love... Prepare for Indigestion
- B-side: "Here's a Heart"
- Released: 3 June 1966
- Recorded: 17 May 1966
- Studio: Philips (London)
- Genre: Pop rock
- Length: 2:21
- Label: Fontana
- Songwriters: Ken Howard; Alan Blaikley
- Producer: Steve Rowland

Dave Dee, Dozy, Beaky, Mick & Tich singles chronology
"Hold Tight!" (1966)	"Hideaway" (1966)	"Bend It!" (1966)

"Hideaway" is a song by Dave Dee, Dozy, Beaky, Mick & Tich, released as a single in June 1966. It peaked at number 10 on the UK Singles Chart.

== Track listing ==
7": Fontana / TF 711

1. "Hideaway" – 2:21
2. "Here's a Heart" – 3:13

== Reception ==
Reviewed in Record Mirror: "The boys invariably get something dead catchy going – here it's an opening instrumentally, with a repetitive beat. Another good vocal arrangement and the song stands up in any company".

== Charts ==
Chart (1966)	Peak position
Australia (Kent Music Report)	80
Canada Top Singles (RPM)	69
Germany (GfK)	3
Ireland (IRMA)	10
Netherlands (Dutch Top 40)	28
New Zealand (Listener)	13
Sweden (Tio i Topp)	14
UK Singles (Official Charts)	10
