= Şilavar =

- Municipality
- Location within Azerbaijan
- Coordinates: 38°45′11″N 48°49′56″E
- Country: Azerbaijan
- Rayon: Lankaran

Population
  - Total: 2,285
- Time zone: UTC+4 (AZT)
  - Summer (DST): UTC+5 (AZT)

Şilavar (also, Şiləvar, Shilavar, and Shilyavar) is a village and municipality in the Lankaran Rayon of Azerbaijan. It has a population of 2,285.
