= Bang Cartoon =

Satirical flash cartoon website

BANG! cartoons
- Website type: Website
- Available in: English
- Owner: John Tayman
- Creator: John Tayman
- Website: bangcartoon.com
- Commercial: yes
- Launched: September 2003
- Current status: Active

Bang Cartoon (also called Bang Cartoons or Bang!) was a website that hosts satirical Flash cartoons based almost exclusively on the NFL. It was created in September 2003. It was operated by John Tayman who is a lifelong fan of the NFL and follows the Washington Redskins.

In September 2005, a podcast series was introduced hosted by Tayman and the site's producer Tom Lacks. Like the cartoons it is satirical and based mostly on the NFL. Lacks is an avid Buckeye and Cowboy fan and this is often a source humor on the show.

The cartoons grew out of Tayman's love for the NFL and his belief that many NFL fans take the sport too seriously. It has attracted both praise and criticism and has also become popular among a number of the players that they generally parody. The site hosts an active message board community which hosts discussion about the cartoon and podcasts. Links can be found on many player websites, most notably Clinton Portis and Santana Moss.

== History ==
It began in early 2003 when Tayman produced two cartoons, about the Washington Redskins owner Daniel Snyder stealing players from the New York Jets and broadcaster John Madden getting his head stuck in a bucket. From there each cartoon gained an increasing audience. The release of "Booyah!," a cartoon parodying ESPN anchor Stuart Scott, Dallas Cowboys running back Emmitt Smith and Oakland Raiders owner Al Davis saw the numbers of visitors increase significantly.

The site's popularity increased significantly in December 2003 with the release of "Michael Vick Takes A Crap," parodying the seemingly endless praising of Vick by Mike Patrick, Paul Maguire, and Joe Theismann during a Sunday night game on ESPN against the Carolina Panthers. Traffic to the site overwhelmed its servers and Tayman was forced to search for a new server.

Tayman was contacted by Eric Leichter, an owner and administrator of Extremeskins, a Washington Redskins fan site. Leichter offered to host the cartoons on Extremeskins. Tayman agreed and it became Bang Cartoon's new host. It remained there until the summer of 2005 when it was removed from Extremeskins after the Washington Redskins purchased the site and determined that, due to the scornful nature of some of the cartoons, it not be officially connected with Bang Cartoon. Bang Cartoon then became exclusively featured on its own domain where it remains to date.

A new website and forum were introduced in early 2006 and the website's content was expanded in August 2006. The site now also covers music, movies and politics through columns e-mailed to the site.

=== Development ===
In April 2004 Bang Cartoon released "Going Poston," a cartoon about sports agents Carl and Kevin Poston and their client, then NFL rookie Kellen Winslow II. The cartoon was a satirical look at the upcoming contract negotiations between the Postons and the Cleveland Browns. The following Sunday, ESPN used the cartoon on their program Outside the Lines in a segment about the Postons. In the segment they showed the cartoon to one of the Postons, who laughed at it, and called it "unfortunate." Later in the program, sports agent and former NBA star Len Elmore said the cartoon was "disgusting" and carried "racial overtones," due to the accents and attitudes of the characters. From there a small storm began in which the accusations of racism surfaced. It culminated when Tayman appeared on sports radio in Cleveland to answer growing questions as to the motives behind the characterization.

=== Favorite of the NFL ===
Bang Cartoon has been featured on national television and given Tayman a fair measure of notoriety in the NFL. When Detroit Lions Coach Jim Schwartz was the Tennessee Titans' defensive coordinator, he sent Tayman a letter detailing how the locker room "stopped and watched when new cartoons came out." Despite the steady flow of criticism directed towards Washington Redskins owner, Daniel Snyder, it is rumored that the reclusive owner is a fan of the site

== Characters ==
Most characters are satirical portrayals of actual NFL players, coaches and journalists. However “The Justice Guys” feature NFL players and coaches as superheroes. Non-NFL personalities such as George W Bush have also appeared. There are also a number of characters that have been created by Bang Cartoons, with news reporters Harry Sphincter and Bill Spleen and newsreader Lance Pants the most frequent of these.

Other frequent characters include:

- Tiki Barber
- Bronco Billy
- Tom Brady
- Colonel Kofflin
- Vinny Cerrato
- Bill Cowher
- Brett Favre
- Jeff Garcia
- Roger Goodell
- Jerry Jones
- Adam "Pacman" Jones
- John Madden
- Matt Millen
- Terrell Owens
- Kevin Poston and Carl Poston
- Drew Rosenhaus
- Frebby Smoop
- The Generalissimo
- Paul Tagliabue
- Mike Tomlin
- Michael Vick
- Ricky Williams
- Kellen Winslow II
- Robert Kraft
- Bill Belichick

== Bang Cartoon Radio Hour ==
In September 2005 a podcast series called The Bang Cartoon Radio Hour was introduced to the site. It features Tayman and fellow site developer Tom Lacks talking for about an hour discussing issues in the NFL. The two met six years ago in an NFL chat room, and Lacks, who works in radio, expressed interest in helping with Bang Cartoon. Tayman saw it as a great chance to work on a new project.

Like the cartoons they take a satirical approach to most issues. They will try to avoid analysis of games or players, believing that to be something everyone does. Lacks often provides audio of notable or amusing quotes from players, coaches and announcers.

"The cartoon is fun, but it's only one idea," he said. "By the time I put the cartoon out there for you to laugh at it, I've seen in 10,000 times. I'm tired of it. I'm done with it."

Tayman estimates that he and Lacks have shaken hands just two or three times in six years, that hasn't detracted from their podcast.

In May 2006, the Radio Hour was named the winner of the Podcast-O-Rama, a contest which pitted podcasts against one another in a bracket style tournament. The contest was hosted and sponsored by vitalpodcasts.com and TPSRadio.net. In November 2006 a MySpace page was set up for it.

The podcast is available for free on iTunes or the Bang Cartoon Radio Hour website.

=== Other features ===
With the introduction of a new website a number of other features were added.

- Meet the Mullettes a sitcom about rednecks Skeeter Mullette, his wife Raylene, his brother Duane and his best friend Jim-Bob Stuckey. Tayman portrays all characters. This has now expanded into a weekly cartoon feature called "The Super Awesome Football Show."
- The Bang Music hour which showcases unsigned artists and bands which have been e-mailed to Tayman by visitors to the site.
