= The Palm Beach Band Boys =

American musical group

The Palm Beach Band Boys was an American studio recording group ostensibly assembled by RCA Victor to capitalize on the success of The New Vaudeville Band's hit single, "Winchester Cathedral". They performed in a style for which the New Vaudeville Band's promoters coined the term, newstalgia, a kind of faux 1920s/1930s sound, featuring nasal vocals, banjo, brass, electric guitar, rock drums, and bassoon. (Mort Goode uses the term in his liner notes for their first album.) According to a December 1966 TIME article, the vocalist is actually "an RCA executive who croons while holding his nose."

Their album Winchester Cathedral peaked at #149 on the Billboard 200. Their song "I'm Gonna Sit Right Down and Write Myself a Letter" peaked at #25 on the Adult Contemporary chart and No. 117 on the Bubbling Under Hot 100 Chart.

== Discography ==
=== Winchester Cathedral ===
Their first LP (Mono LPM-3734/Stereo LSP-3734), Winchester Cathedral, recorded in RCA Victor's Studios A and B in New York City was released in 1966. It featured arrangements by Billy Mure and was produced by Danny Davis.

A side

1. Winchester Cathedral
2. A Little Bit Independent
3. Boo-Hoo
4. Let a Smile Be Your Umbrella
5. I'm Gonna Sit Right Down and Write Myself a Letter

B side

1. Bend It
2. It Looks Like Rain in Cherry Blossom Lane
3. I Don't Want to Set the World on Fire
4. Ida, Sweet As Apple Cider
5. Gypsy Caravan

=== The Palm Beach Band Boys Strike Again ===
A subsequent album (LSP-3808) was released in 1967, The Palm Beach Band Boys Strike Again.

Songs

1. The Object of My Affection
2. Josephine
3. Me and My Shadow
4. At Sundown
5. You Tell Me Your Dream
6. Wildflower
7. Strangers in the Night
8. Mean To Me
9. I Don't Know Why
10. I'll Get By
11. Suzette
