= BANG file =

A BANG file (balanced and nested grid file) is a point access method which divides space into a nonperiodic grid. Each spatial dimension is divided by a linear hash. Cells may intersect and points may be distributed between them.
