= If Music Be the Food of Love... Prepare for Indigestion =

Studio album by Dave Dee, Dozy, Beaky, Mick & Tich
- Released: 16 December 1966
- Recorded: October–November 1966
- Genre: Beat; psychedelic pop
- Length: 30:52
- Label: Fontana

Dave Dee, Dozy, Beaky, Mick & Tich chronology
| Dave Dee, Dozy, Beaky, Mick & Tich (1966) | If Music Be the Food of Love... Prepare for Indigestion (1966) | If No One Sang (1968) |

Professional ratings
Review scores
| Source | Rating |
|---|---|
| Allmusic | 3.5/5 stars |

If Music Be the Food of Love... Prepare for Indigestion is the second studio album by English rock band Dave Dee, Dozy, Beaky, Mick & Tich, released in December 1966. It features the singles "Hideaway", "You Make It Move" and "Bend It!". Unlike the band's debut album, it failed to reach the top 20 of the UK Albums Chart, peaking at number 27. Reviewing the album for Allmusic, Lindsay Planer described If Music Be the Food of Love... as "another batch of strong Brit-pop compositions" and praised the band's sense of humour and "sharp musicality".

== Cover ==
The cover features the band laid or sat down in a black room, with cushions and blankets on the floor. The cover personnel is (from left to right): Mick, Dave Dee, Beaky, Dozy, and Tich.

== Track listing ==
All tracks are written by Howard Blaikley (Alan Blaikley and Ken Howard); except where noted

| No. | Title | Writer(s) | Length |
|---|---|---|---|
| 1. | "Bang" | Bill Martin, Phil Coulter | 2:29 |
| 2. | "I'm on the Up" | | 2:22 |
| 3. | "Hideaway" | | 2:23 |
| 4. | "Shame" | Dave Dee, Dozy, Beaky, Mick & Tich | 2:05 |
| 5. | "Hands Off!" | | 2:04 |
| 6. | "Loos of England" | | 3:26 |
| 7. | "Help Me" | Steve Rowland | 3:11 |
| 8. | "Master Llewellyn" | Dave Dee, Dozy, Beaky, Mick & Tich | 2:23 |
| 9. | "You Make It Move" | | 2:44 |
| 10. | "All I Want" | | 2:33 |
| 11. | "Hair on My Chinny-Chin-Chin (Huff 'N' Puff)" | Ronald Blackwell | 2:37 |
| 12. | "Bend It!" | | 2:35 |

== Personnel ==
Dave Dee, Dozy, Beaky, Mick & Tich

- Dave Dee – vocals
- Trevor "Dozy" Ward-Davies – bass
- John "Beaky" Dymond – rhythm guitar
- Michael "Mick" Wilson – drums
- Ian "Tich" Amey – lead guitar

== See also ==
- Orsino (Twelfth Night) for the phrase "If Music Be the Food of Love"
