= Zaz-e Gharbi Rural District =

Rural district in Lorestan province, Iran

Zaz-e Gharbi Rural District دهستان زز غربي
- Rural District
- Location within Iran
- Coordinates: 33°13′N 48°59′E
- Country: Iran
- Province: Lorestan
- County: Aligudarz
- District: Zaz and Mahru
- Established: 1987
- Capital: Sartang-e Barzeh

Population (2016)
  - Total: 1,335
- Time zone: UTC+3:30 (IRST)

Zaz-e Gharbi Rural District (Persian: دهستان زز غربي) is in Zaz and Mahru District of Aligudarz County, Lorestan province, Iran. Its capital is the village of Sartang-e Barzeh.

== Demographics ==
=== Population ===
At the time of the 2006 National Census, the rural district's population was 2,248 in 392 households. There were 1,944 inhabitants in 367 households at the following census of 2011. The 2016 census measured the population of the rural district as 1,335 in 350 households. The most populous of its 27 villages was Sartang-e Barzeh, with 224 people.

=== Other villages in the rural district ===
- Ardesi
- Darreh Dang
- Dorcheh
- Hayyeh
- Kamar Gap
- Sar Qaleh
