= Mahru Rural District =

Rural district in Lorestan province, Iran

Mahru Rural District Persian: دهستان ماهرو
- Rural District
- Location within Iran
- Coordinates: 33°02′N 48°56′E
- Country: Iran
- Province: Lorestan
- County: Aligudarz
- District: Zaz and Mahru
- Established: 1987
- Capital: Marg Sar

Population (2016)
  - Total: 1,814
- Time zone: UTC+3:30 (IRST)

Mahru Rural District (Persian: دهستان ماهرو) is in Zaz and Mahru District of Aligudarz County, Lorestan province, Iran. Its capital is the village of Marg Sar.

== Demographics ==
=== Population ===
At the time of the 2006 National Census, the rural district's population was 2,023 in 344 households. There were 2,057 inhabitants in 378 households at the following census of 2011. The 2016 census measured the population of the rural district as 1,814 in 415 households. The most populous of its 53 villages was Marg Sar, with 379 people.

=== Other villages in the rural district ===
- Farengeh
- Mahi
- Panbeh Kar
- Pas Fidaneh
- Sar Qaleh
- Seh Ran Bala
- Seh Ran Pain
