= Zaz-e Sharqi Rural District =

Rural district in Lorestan province, Iran

Zaz-e Sharqi Rural District Persian: دهستان زز شرقي
- Rural District
- Location within Iran
- Coordinates: 33°07′N 49°14′E
- Country: Iran
- Province: Lorestan
- County: Aligudarz
- District: Zaz and Mahru
- Established: 1987
- Capital: Shulabad

Population (2016)
  - Total: 4,904
- Time zone: UTC+3:30 (IRST)

Zaz-e Sharqi Rural District (Persian: دهستان زز شرقي) (Note: Formerly Zaz Rural District (دهستان زز)) is in Zaz and Mahru District of Aligudarz County, Lorestan province, Iran. It is administered from the city of Shulabad. (Note: Formerly the village of Shulabad-e Sofla)

== Demographics ==
=== Population ===
At the time of the 2006 National Census, the rural district's population was 7,169 in 1,246 households. There were 5,634 inhabitants in 1,176 households at the following census of 2011. The 2016 census measured the population of the rural district as 4,904 in 1,268 households. The most populous of its 70 villages was Pir Emam, with 580 people.

=== Other villages in the rural district ===
- Firuzabad
- Galeh Yar
- Goli Chas
- Kodivar
- Shah Makan-e Pain
- Shah Makan-e Bala
- Sheykhan-e Davud Khuni
