= Zaz and Mahru District =

District in Lorestan province, Iran

Zaz and Mahru District Persian: بخش زز و ماهرو
- District
- Location within Iran
- Coordinates: 33°08′N 49°10′E
- Country: Iran
- Province: Lorestan
- County: Aligudarz
- Capital: Shulabad

Population (2016)
  - Total: 9,584
- Time zone: UTC+3:30 (IRST)

Zaz and Mahru District (Persian: بخش زز و ماهرو) is in Aligudarz County, Lorestan province, Iran. Its capital is the city of Shulabad. (Note: Formerly the village of Shulabad-e Sofla)

== History ==
The village of Shulabad-e Sofla, after merging with several other villages, was converted to a city and renamed Shulabad in 2010.

== Demographics ==
=== Population ===
At the time of the 2006 census, the district's population was 11,440 in 1,982 households. The following census in 2011 counted 11,188 people in 2,257 households. The 2016 census measured the population of the district as 9,584 inhabitants in 2,455 households.

=== Administrative divisions ===
Zaz and Mahru District Population
Administrative Divisions	2006	2011	2016
Mahru RD	2,023	2,057	1,814
Zaz-e Gharbi RD	2,248	1,944	1,335
Zaz-e Sharqi RD (Note: Formerly Zaz Rural District)	7,169	5,634	4,904
Shulabad (city)		1,553	1,531
Total	11,440	11,188	9,584
RD = Rural District
