= Marmalade discography =

- Studio albums: 10
- Compilation albums: 8
- Singles: 37

This discography is a list of singles and albums released by Scottish band Marmalade.

== Albums ==
=== Studio albums ===
Title	Album details
There's a Lot of It About	Released: December 1968; Label: CBS; Formats: LP
Reflections of the Marmalade	Released: June 1970; Label: Decca; Formats: LP, MC
Songs	Released: November 1971; Label: Decca; Formats: LP, MC
Our House Is Rocking	Released: October 1974; Label: EMI; Formats: LP
The Only Light on My Horizon Now	Released: July 1977; Label: Target; Formats: LP
Doing It All for You	Released: December 1978; Label: Sky; Formats: LP
Heavens Above	Released: 1979; Label: Queen; Formats: LP, MC; Scandinavia-only release
Marmalade	Released: December 1980; Label: G&P; Formats: LP, MC; Only released in certain countries including the US
Heartbreaker	Released: 1982; Label: Spectra; Formats: LP; Scandinavia-only release
Penultimate	Release date: December 2013; Label: Finyl Vinyl; Formats: CD

=== Compilation albums ===
Title	Album details
The Best of the Marmalade	Released: December 1969; Label: CBS; Formats: LP
The World of the Marmalade	Released: June 1976; Label: Decca; Formats: LP
Back on the Road	Released: May 1981; Label: Decca; Formats: LP
The Definitive Collection	Released: 1996; Label: Castle Communications; Formats: CD
Kaleidoscope: The Psych-Pop Sessions	Released: 13 January 2003; Label: Castle Music; Formats: CD
BBC Sessions	Released: May 2004; Label: Castle Music; Formats: CD
The Ultimate Collection	Released: 28 February 2005; Label: Sanctuary; Formats: 3xCD
Fine Cuts: The Best of Marmalade	Released: September 2011; Label: Salvo; Formats: 2xCD

== Singles ==
Single (A-side, B-side) Both sides from same album except where indicated.	Year	Peak chart positions										Album
Single (A-side, B-side) Both sides from same album except where indicated.	Year	UK	AUS	CAN	GER	IRE	NL	NOR	NZ	SA	US	Album
As Dean Ford and the Gaylords
"Twenty Miles" b/w "What's the Matter with Me"	1964	—	—	—	—	—	—	—	—	—	—	Non-album singles
"Mr Heartbreak's Here Instead" b/w "I Won't"	1964	—	—	—	—	—	—	—	—	—	—	Non-album singles
"The Name Game" b/w "That Lonely Feeling"	1965	—	—	—	—	—	—	—	—	—	—	Non-album singles
"He's a Good Face (But He's Down and Out)" b/w "You Know It Too"	1966	—	—	—	—	—	—	—	—	—	—	Non-album singles
As the Marmalade
"It's All Leading Up to Saturday Night" b/w "Wait A Minute, Baby"	1966	—	—	—	—	—	—	—	—	—	—	Non-album singles
"Can't Stop Now" b/w "There Ain't No Use in Hanging On" (from There's a Lot of It About)	1967	—	—	—	—	—	—	—	—	—	—	Non-album singles
"I See the Rain" b/w "Laughing Man" (non-album track)	1967	—	—	—	—	—	— (Note: "I See the Rain" did not enter the Dutch Single Top 20, but did peak at number 23 on the Dutch Top 40.)	—	—	—	—	There's a Lot of It About
"Otherwise It's Been a Perfect Day" (Note: "Otherwise It's Been A Perfect Day" was only released as a single in the US and Canada.) b/w "I See the Rain"	1967	—	—	—	—	—	—	—	—	—	—	Non-album single
"Man in a Shop" b/w "Cry (The Shoob Doroorie Song)" (non-album track)	1967	—	—	—	—	—	—	—	—	—	—	There's a Lot of It About
"Lovin' Things" b/w "Hey Joe"	1968	6	—	—	39	10	—	—	—	—	—	There's a Lot of It About
"Wait for Me Mary-Anne" b/w "Mess Around"	1968	30	—	—	—	—	—	—	—	—	—	There's a Lot of It About
"Ob-La-Di, Ob-La-Da" b/w "Chains" (from There's a Lot of It About)	1968	1	—	—	2	1	3	1	1	—	—	Non-album singles
"Baby Make It Soon" b/w "Time Is on My Side"	1969	9	—	—	—	6	—	10	—	3	—	Non-album singles
"Butterfly" b/w "I Shall Be Released" (from There's a Lot of It About)	1969	—	—	—	—	—	—	—	—	—	—	Non-album singles
"Reflections of My Life" b/w "Rollin' My Thing" (non-album track)	1969	3	47	6	20	2	9	8	13	5	10	Reflections of the Marmalade
"Rainbow" b/w "The Ballad of Cherry Flavar"	1970	3	—	36	21	4	8	—	—	13	51	Non-album singles
"My Little One" b/w "Is Your Life Your Own?"	1971	15	—	—	—	19	21	—	—	—	123	Non-album singles
"Cousin Norman" b/w "Lonely Man"	1971	6	61	—	—	9	— (Note: "Cousin Norman" did not enter the Dutch Single Top 30, but did peak at number 23 on the Dutch Top 40.)	—	17	5	—	Non-album singles
"Back on the Road" b/w "Love Is Hard to Re-Arrange" (non-album track)	1971	35	—	—	—	—	—	—	20	—	—	Songs
"Radancer" b/w "Sarah" (from Songs) / "Just One Woman"	1972	6	70	—	31	10	—	—	—	8	—	Non-album single
As Marmalade
"(Your Wish Is In) The Wishing Well" b/w "Engine Driver"	1973	—	—	—	—	—	—	—	—	—	—	Non-album single
"Our House Is Rockin'" b/w "Hallelujah Freedom Blues" (non-album track)	1973	—	—	—	—	—	—	—	—	—	—	Our House Is Rockin'
"Come Back Jo" b/w "The Way It Is"	1974	—	—	—	—	—	—	—	—	—	—	Our House Is Rockin'
"Falling Apart at the Seams" b/w "Fly, Fly, Fly" (non-album track)	1976	9	89	—	—	9	—	—	29	—	49	The Only Light On My Horizon Now
"Walking a Tightrope" b/w "My Everything" (non-album track)	1976	—	—	—	—	—	—	—	—	—	—	The Only Light On My Horizon Now
"What You Need Is a Miracle" b/w "The Rusty Hands of Time"	1976	—	—	—	—	—	—	—	—	—	—	The Only Light On My Horizon Now
"Hello Baby" b/w "Seafaring Man" (non-album track)	1976	—	—	—	—	—	—	—	—	—	—	The Only Light On My Horizon Now
"The Only Light On My Horizon Now" b/w "Louisiana"	1977	—	—	—	—	—	—	—	—	—	—	The Only Light On My Horizon Now
"Mystery Has Gone" b/w "Wasting My Time"	1977	—	—	—	—	—	—	—	—	—	—	Non-album singles
"Talking in Your Sleep" b/w "Make It Really Easy" (from Doing It All for You)	1978	—	—	—	—	—	—	—	—	—	—	Non-album singles
"Heavens Above" b/w "You're a Lady"	1978	—	—	—	—	—	—	—	—	—	—	Doing It All for You
"Made in Germany" b/w "Ooh Baby"	1979	—	—	—	—	—	—	—	—	—	—	Non-album single
"America" (Note: "America" was only released as a single in the US.) b/w "Oh Suzie"	1980	—	—	—	—	—	—	—	—	—	—	Marmalade
"Lady Jane" (Note: "Lady Jane" was only released as a single in the US.) b/w "Back on the Road"	1981	—	—	—	—	—	—	—	—	—	—	Marmalade
"Heartbreaker" b/w "I Listen to My Heart"	1984	—	—	—	—	—	—	—	—	—	—	Heartbreaker
"Golden Shreds" (fast side; medley) b/w "Golden Shreds" (slow side)	1985	—	—	—	—	—	—	—	—	—	—	Non-album singles
"Scirocco" (with Dave Dee) (Note: "Scirocco" was only released as a single in Germany.) b/w "I Don't Believe in Love Anymore"	1989	—	—	—	—	—	—	—	—	—	—	Non-album singles
"—" denotes releases that did not chart or were not released in that territory.
