= Patrick Fairley =

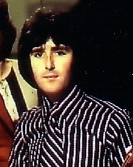
- Fairley in 1968

Background information
- Born: 14 April 1943; Glasgow, Scotland, UK
- Died: 11 August 2020 (aged 77) Los Angeles, California, USA
- Genres: Pop rock
- Years active: 1961–1980s
- Formerly of: Marmalade

Patrick Fairley (14 April 1943 – 11 August 2020) was a Scottish musician who was the rhythm guitarist and keyboardist for Marmalade (originally called The Gaylords) from 1961 to 1972.

== Career ==
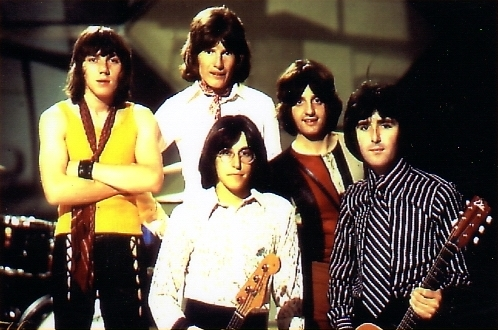
Fairley (far right) in 1968 with The Marmalade

Fairley formed The Gaylords in 1961 with Billy Johnston in Baillieston, a suburb in eastern Glasgow. In 1964, with Thomas McAleese, known by his stage name Dean Ford, released four singles under the name "Dean Ford and the Gaylords", and had a local hit. By 1966, Fairley was the only founding member of the Gaylords still in the band when they changed their name to Marmalade and had a number of hit songs such as "Ob-La-Di, Ob-La-Da", "Baby Make It Soon", "Reflections of My Life", and "Rainbow". They were the first Scottish group to have a number one song on the UK Singles Chart.

Fairley worked with former Marmalade guitarist Junior Campbell, when his solo career began to take off. Fairley was a part of Campbell's live backing band when he appeared on Top of the Pops in 1972, performing "Hallelujah Freedom". Fairley left Marmalade in 1972, not long after their third studio album "Songs" was released, to run the group's music publishing company. Pat worked with the Bee Gees and toured with Yes.

== Personal life and death ==
Fairley married Nancy Fairley in 1965, and remained for fifty-five years until Pat's death.

Fairley illegally immigrated to Los Angeles in the late 1970s (but was given blanket amnesty by then USA president Ronald Reagan in the 1980s), continuing his works in music publishing there as well. When he retired from the music industry, he set up a Scottish-themed pub in Canoga Park, Los Angeles called The Scotland Yard Pub. He sold the pub in March 2018.

Fairley died at his home in Los Angeles from throat cancer on 11 August 2020, aged 77. Marmalade member William "Junior" Campbell described Pat as a “life-long friend” and someone who was “strong, loyal” and “always the group leader”.
