= The Attack (band) =

English rock band

- The Attack's founding lineup in early 1967; From left: Gerry Henderson, Richard Shirman, Bob Hodges, David O'List, Alan Whitehead

Background information
- Origin: London, England
- Genres: Psychedelic rock, freakbeat, hard rock
- Years active: 1966–1968, 1979
- Labels: Decca, RPM (reissues)
- Past members: Richard Shirman; David O'List; Alan Whitehead; Bob Hodges; Gerry Henderson; Barney Barnfield; Plug Davis; George Watt; Geoff Richardson; Chris Allen; Kenny Harold; John Du Cann; Keith Hodge; Roger Deane

The Attack were an English freakbeat/psychedelic rock band formed in 1966 around singer Richard Shirman (26 April 1949, Earl's Court, South West London – 26 July 2017). The first line-up featured drummer Alan Whitehead from Marmalade, guitarist and trumpeter David O'List (later of the Nice) - later replaced by John Du Cann (later of Andromeda and Atomic Rooster), Richard Shirman on vocals, Bob Hodges on piano and organ and finally Gerry Henderson on bass. Their first single "Try It" had also been recorded by the Standells and Ohio Express. They also released a version of "Hi Ho Silver Lining", a few days earlier than Jeff Beck. Richard Shirman was invited to be singer with Andromeda but he declined.

In 1979, Shirman reunited the Attack. Two years later he founded another band, Hershey and the 12 Bars who released an album in 2000; Greatest Hits Volume II (A New Day Records, AND CD43).

== Discography ==
=== Compilation albums ===
- Magic in the Air (1990), Reflection
- Magic in the Air (reissue) (1992), Aftermath
- Complete Recordings 1967-68 (1999), Acme
- Final Daze (2001), Angel Air
- About Time! (2006), RPM, Bam-Caruso

=== Singles ===
- "Try It" b/w "We Don't Know" (1967), Decca
- "Hi Ho Silver Lining" b/w "Any More Than I Do" (1967), Decca – UK No. 53 (Note: Chart position is from the official UK "Breakers List".)
- "Created By Clive" b/w "Colour of My Mind" (1967), Decca
- "Neville Thumbcatch" b/w "Lady Orange Peel" (1968), Decca
- "Hi Ho Silver Lining" b/w "Any More Than I Do" (reissue) (1972), Decca
- "Created By Clive" b/w "Colour of My Mind" (reissue) (2005), Acme
