= Kibworth =

Area/villages in Leicestershire, England

Coordinates: 52.54°N 1°W

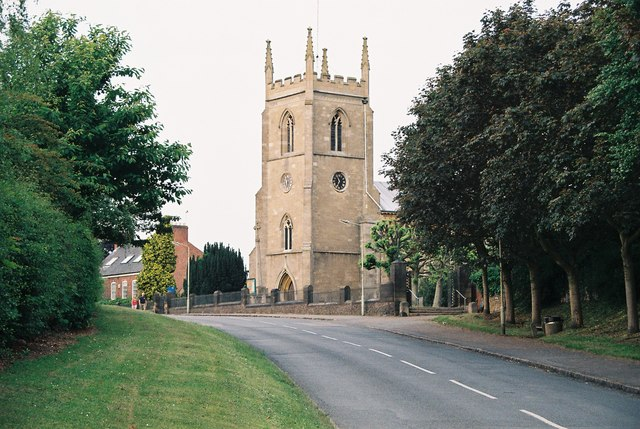
St Wilfrid's Church, Kibworth Harcourt

Kibworth (/ˈkɪbwərθ/) is an area of the Harborough district of Leicestershire, England, that contains two civil parishes: the villages of Kibworth Beauchamp (/ˈbiːtʃəm/) and Kibworth Harcourt (/ˈhɑːrkɔːrt/). At the 2011 census, Kibworth Beauchamp had a population of 5,433 and Kibworth Harcourt 990. The villages are roughly divided by the Midland Main Line. Kibworth is close to Foxton Locks, Market Harborough, and Leicester.

== History ==
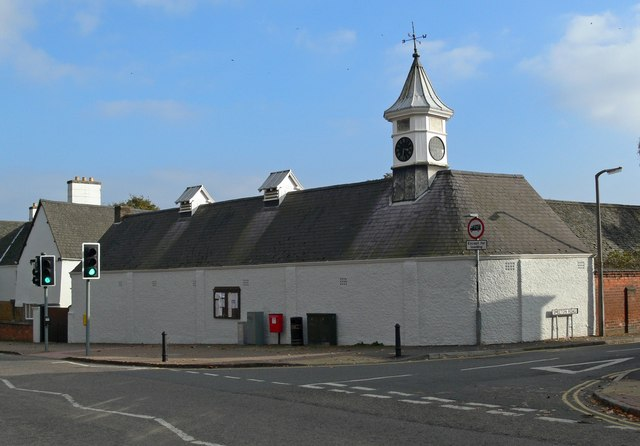
Kibworth Beauchamp High Street

In 1270 Walter de Merton, the founder of Merton College, Oxford, bought a large part of the parish of Kibworth Harcourt from Saer de Harcourt, who had been forced to sell the estate after giving his support to the unsuccessful "Second Barons' War" led by Simon de Montfort. Much of the parish has remained the property of Merton College, Oxford to the present day. There is a stained-glass window depicting Walter de Merton in the bell tower of the parish church, St Wilfrid's, of which the warden and scholars of the college are joint patrons with the Bishop of Leicester. The church is a Grade II* listed building.

A village school was founded in 1709, and endowed by Sir Nathaniel Edwards.

Kibworth Harcourt was the birthplace of the writer/reformer Anna Laetitia Barbauld (1743–1825) and her brother John Aikin. Their father, John Aikin (1713–1780), kept a dissenting academy there and served as minister of a nearby Presbyterian chapel. The family moved in 1757 to Warrington.

On 23 July 1825 the ancient tower and spire of St Wilfrid's collapsed.

=== Michael Wood's Story of England ===
In September 2010, Kibworth was the central feature of Michael Wood's Story of England, a documentary aired on both BBC Four, BBC Two, and repeated on the UKTV channel Yesterday, and PBS America, presented by Michael Wood about the history of England framed through Kibworth.

A book of the same name was published by Viking. The series was likened to Who Do You Think You Are? for a whole community. Villagers (Kibworth Improvement Team - KiT) have created a new website and successfully requested a grant of £48,200 from the Heritage Lottery Fund to continue the legacy of the TV series by creating a Kibworth Guide Booklet (heritage trails for Kibworth Harcourt, Kibworth Beauchamp and Smeeton Westerby), several interpretation panels around the three villages, ongoing study materials for the three tiers of local schools, and an Archive (Virtual Museum).

== Facilities ==
Kibworth has a number of shops including 2 charity shops, a community newspaper (The Kibworth & District Chronicle), and since 2002 new shops, including a branch of the Co-Op. New housing continues to be built on the edge of the village, causing periodic controversy.

The Bookshop, which opened in the High Street in 2009, won a regional award for Independent Bookseller of The Year in 2012.

Kibworth is home to a secondary school named Kibworth Mead Academy.

On the 8th of September 2024, a new skatepark was opened in Kibworth after being constructed over the course of the year. The skatepark joined a recently opened zipwire as one of the latest public leisure facilities in Kibworth.

=== Transport ===
Arriva Midlands operates Sapphire route X3 between Leicester and Market Harborough and Stagecoach Midlands route X7 between Leicester and Northampton, both via the village. The Midland Main Line runs through the area, but Kibworth railway station, which served both villages, closed in 1968.

== Sport and Leisure ==
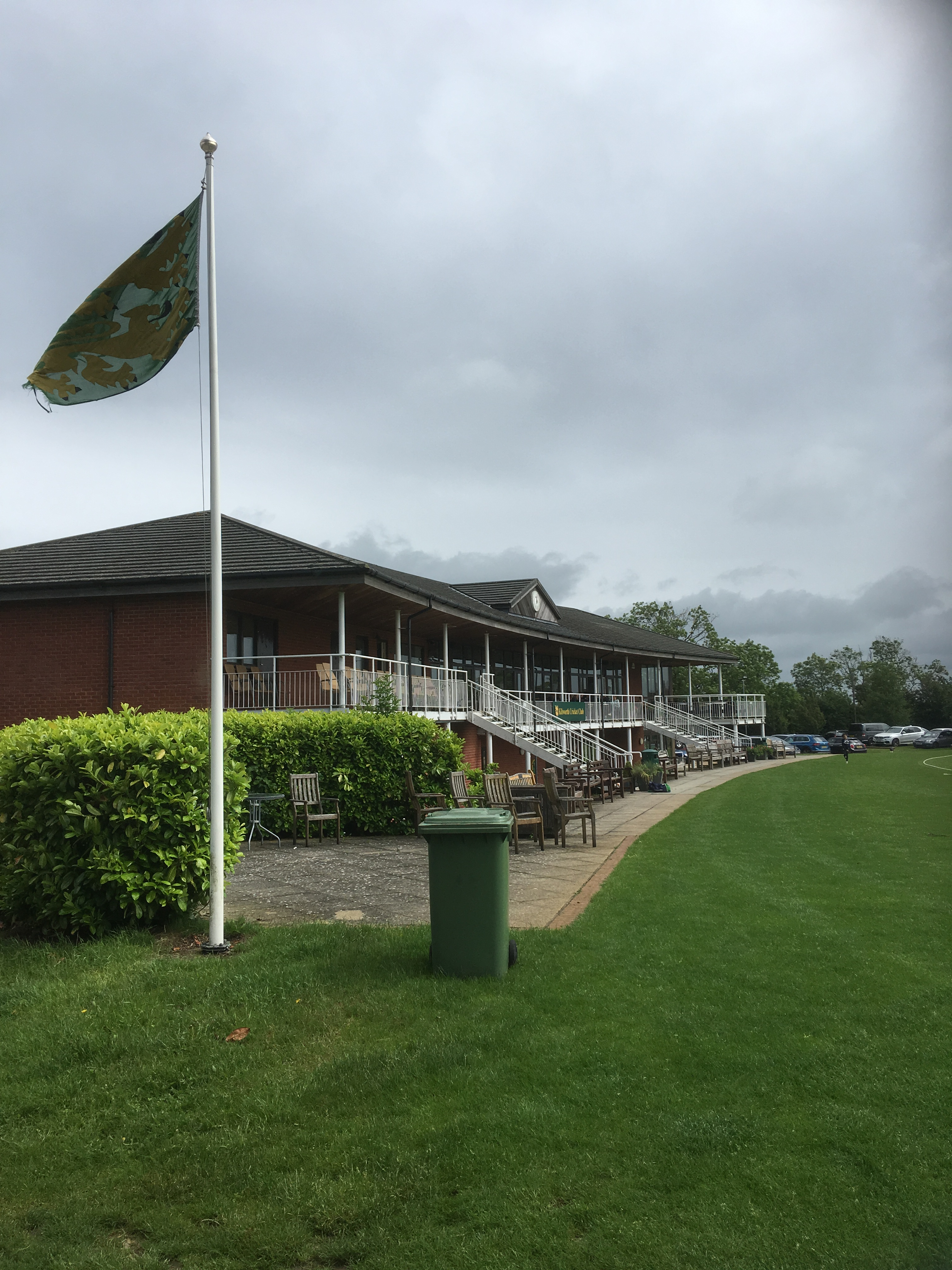
Kibworth Cricket Club Pavilion (2019)

=== Cricket ===
It's not clear when Kibworth Cricket Club was founded, but evidence of cricket being played in the villages dates back to 1846. The club moved to their new ground in 2006. Kibworth CC has a significant success record, with 13 County championship titles to their name and two ECB National Club Cricket Championship wins, in 2004 and 2008. Kibworth field four senior teams in the Leicestershire and Rutland Cricket League (a designated ECB Premier League) and a Women's team in the East Midlands Women's Cricket League. They also have an established junior training section that play competitive cricket in the Leicestershire Youth League.

=== Football ===
The association football club, previously known as Kibworth and Smeeton, was renamed in 2018 as Kibworth Town, merging the younger and senior teams together.

=== Rugby union ===
Founded in 1923, Kibworth was the home of Kibworth RUFC until a move to Market Harborough in 1957. During their time in Kibworth, the club played at three separate grounds, one next to the Old Swan pub, one located on the recreation ground, and one in a field on Fleckney Road. The club retained the name "Kibworth RUFC" right up until 2006, when its name was changed to "Market Harborough RUFC".

Keeping up the rugby tradition, Kibworth CE Primary School is host to Kibworth Rugby Stars, a children's rugby club serving ages 18 months to 6 years.

=== Other clubs ===
The village also has clubs for snooker, tennis, golf, bowls and dance.

=== Kibworth Harcourt Mill ===
The mill, a Grade II* listed structure, last worked in the 1930s and until 1936 was owned by Merton College, Oxford, then ownership and responsibility was transferred to the Society for the Protection of Ancient Buildings (SPAB). Restoration costing £350,000 was undertaken from 2020 to 2021. With parts dating from "at least 1711", it is the last surviving post mill in Leicestershire county.

== Notable residents ==
In birth order:

- John Aikin (1713–1780), Unitarian preacher, schoolteacher and father of Anna Laetitia Barbauld, lived and taught in Kibworth in 1730–58.
- Anna Laetitia Barbauld (née Aikin, 1743–1823), poet, essayist, children's author and daughter of John Aikin, was born in Kibworth Harcourt.
- John Aikin (1747–1822), physician, biographer and brother of Anna Laetitia Barbauld, was born in Kibworth Harcourt.
- James Beresford (1764–1840), Anglican cleric and humorist, was rector of Kibworth from 1812 until his death in 1840.
- Colonel John Worthy Chaplin (1840–1920), awarded the Victoria Cross for gallantry in 1860 in the Second China War, was buried in Kibworth New Cemetery.
- Edmund Knox (1847–1937), Anglican bishop, Evangelical writer and father of Ronald Knox, was rector of Kibworth in 1884–1891.
- Samuel Perkins Pick (1858–1919), architect, was educated at Kibworth Grammar School.
- T. E. R. Phillips (1868–1942), Anglican cleric and astronomer specializing in planets, was born in Kibworth.
- Wilfred Knox (1886–1950), Anglican theologian and brother of Ronald Knox, was born in Kibworth.
- Ronald Knox (1888–1957), Roman Catholic monsignor and religious writer, was born in Kibworth.
- Sir Nicholas Harold Lloyd Ridley (1906–2001), inventor of the Intraocular lens, was born in Kibworth.
- Stu Williamson (born 1956), photographer, inventor of the Tri-flector, and drummer for the Scottish group The Marmalade, is based in Kibworth.
