= Sweet Illusion =

1973 song by Junior Campbell

"Sweet Illusion" is a song written and recorded by Junior Campbell in April 1973 as a follow-up single to "Hallelujah Freedom", which had seen success in the UK Singles Chart at the end of the previous year.

The recording took place at Decca Studio 2 in London and featured Campbell on lead vocal, piano, guitar & electric piano, with Ray Duffy on drums and percussion, Rick Westwood of The Tremeloes on bass, and Pete Zorn on flute. Zorn had also played saxophone on Hallelujah Freedom.

The backing vocals were performed by Ruby James, Irene Chanter and Campbell. The recording was engineered by John Burns - Decca staff engineer. The orchestral accompaniment consisted of 12 violins, 4 violas, 4 celli, (Strings) and 3 trumpets, 2 tenor trombones and 1 bass trombone (brass). The arrangement was by Campbell himself.

"Sweet Illusion" was released on 27 April 1973 on Deram DM 387 entering the UK Singles Chart on 2 June 1973. The record spent nine weeks on the chart reaching number 15 position.
