= Stu Williamson (photographer) =

Stuart Gordon Williamson
- Born: Stuart Gordon Williamson; 5 August 1956 (age 69); Oadby, Leicestershire, England
- Occupations: Photographer, Inventor
- Years active: 1980–present
- Website: https://www.stuwilliamson.com

Stu Williamson (born 5 August 1956, in Oadby, Leicestershire, England) is a portrait photographer based in Leicestershire, UK. He grew up in England but has a mix of Scottish and Irish ancestry. Prior to his career in photography he was drummer for the Scottish pop rock group The Marmalade from 1978 to 1980 and performed on their 1978 album Doing It All For You. He then directed his artistic talents towards photography and has continued in this field ever since.

== Photography ==
Williamson specialises in commercial photography, covering a broad range of subjects including architecture, portraiture and brand imagery. His work has included architectural photography commissions in both the United Kingdom and Dubai, including projects associated with Giorgio Armani at the Burj Khalifa and the Jumeirah Group’s Burj Al Arab.

He is also the inventor of the Tri-flector, a photographic lighting reflector designed to offer photographers greater versatility.

== Awards ==
Williamson has won many photographic awards in Europe, which have included Black and White Photographer of the Year, Fine Art Photographer of the Year and Architecture Exterior Photographer of the Year 2010 for his photograph of the Burj Khalifa.

Most recently in 2016, he won the UK Master Photographer of the Year 2016/17 award.

== Stu Williamson Photography ==
Williamson originally established the Stu Williamson Photography business in Cornwall before moving to Market Harborough, Leicestershire, in 1997. In 2006, Williamson moved the business to Dubai.

In 2013, after investment from an entrepreneur friend, Williamson sold his majority stake in the Dubai business and subsequently returned to the UK where he continues his photography business from his studio in Kibworth, Leicestershire.
