= Flake (band) =

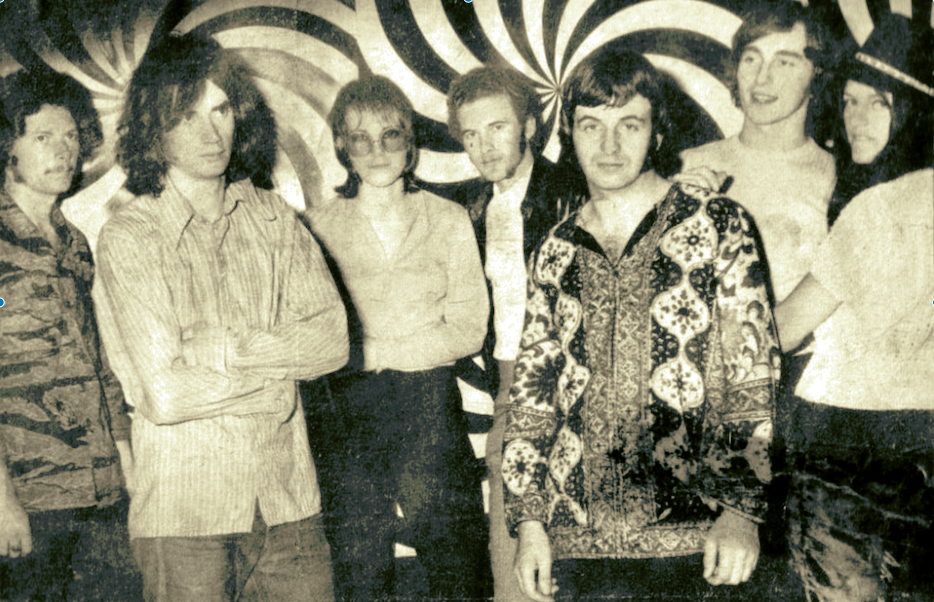

Background information
- Origin: Sydney, New South Wales, Australia
- Genres: Pop, rock
- Years active: 1968–1974, 1989–1991
- Labels: Du Monde /Violet's Holiday/Festival

Flake was an Australian pop and rock group that formed in 1968. They released an album, How's Your Mother!, in December 1971 on the Violet's Holiday label, distributed by Festival. The group appeared on the Go-Set National Top 60 singles chart with cover versions of Bob Dylan's "This Wheel's on Fire" (July 1970), Marmalade's "Reflections of My Life" (January 1971), Vanda and Young's "Life is Getting Better" (June 1971) and Honeybus' "Under the Silent Tree" (November 1971). The group disbanded in 1974 but reunited in 1989 to support a compilation album, Reflections: The Festival File Volume Thirteen, before breaking up again in 1991.

== History ==
Flake formed in late 1968 in Sydney with the line-up of Lindsay Askew on guitar, Mick Gaul on bass guitar, Geoff Gray on lead vocals (ex-Eli), Sharon Sims on lead vocals, Wayne Thomas on drums (ex-Plastic Tears) and Rob Toth on keyboards. They were named for the Small Faces' album, Ogdens' Nut Gone Flake (May 1968) and performed their first gig at Shrublands Hall, Marrickville on 14 November of that year. The first addition to this lineup was Dave Allen, on flute and sax, in 1969. Subsequently the group underwent regular changes to its line-up.

Australian musicologist, Ian McFarlane, described their musical style "From swinging 1960s pop'n'soul to early 1970s progressive rock, Sydney band Flake tried its hand at just about every musical genre of the day. Flake was one of the first Sydney club bands to play note-for-note renditions of early Traffic, Spooky Tooth, Deep Purple and Vanilla Fudge material. Certainly possessed of a wealth of talent, the band mostly found success with a string of glossy pop singles."

During 1970 Flake signed with the Du Monde label's imprint, Violet's Holiday, which was distributed by Festival Records. Their first charting single, "Wheels on Fire" (July 1970), is a cover version of Bob Dylan's original. It peaked at No.20 on the Go-Set National Top 60 and remained on the charts for 22 weeks. According to McFarlane "Flake's rise on the pop charts coincided with the 1970 radio ban on British and major-label Australian records which lasted for six months" (see 1970 radio ban). "Wheels on Fire" also appeared on Go-Set's end of year singles chart at No.44.

Their second charting single was a cover version of Marmalade's "Reflections of My Life" (January 1971), which reached No.31. It was followed by their version of Vanda & Young's "Life Is Getting Better" (June), which peaked at No.48, and then by a cover of Honeybus' "Under the Silent Tree" (November).

Flake's debut album, How's Your Mother!, was released in December 1971 using the line-up of Gray, Sims and Thomas with Greg Higgs on bass guitar and vocals, John Russell on guitar and Billy Taylor on guitar (ex-Purple Vision).Dave Allen, Denise Caines, Denis Moore, were on various pre-recorded tracks. McFarlane described it as "schizophrenic" with "one side of the band's lightweight pop hits and one side of hard rock tracks spiced with touches of fuzz-drenched psychedelia." In November 2006 Du Monde Records re-issued the album on CD.

At the end of 1972 Thomas left to form a new group, Mr Madness, with three former Flake members, Askew on guitar, Gaul on bass guitar and Toth on keyboards. Flake, however, continued with a changeable line-up and by July 1973 comprised Russell and Taylor with Neale Johns on lead vocals (ex-Blackfeather), Jim Penson on drums (ex-Blackfeather) and Warren Ward on bass guitar (ex-the Flying Circus, Blackfeather). They released a single, "Scotch on the Rocks", in February 1974 via Festival Records' label, Infinity Records and disbanded late that year.

Flake reformed in 1989 with Thomas and Lindsay Askew joined by the latter's brother Rob Askew on bass guitar, Gordon Sheard on guitar and Anna Medley on lead vocals. Festival had issued a compilation album, Reflections: The Festival File Volume Thirteen, in that year. The group continued on the Sydney pub and club circuit until 1991.

== Personnel ==
- Lindsay Askew – guitar (1968–69, 1989–91)
- Mick Gaul – bass guitar (1968–69)
- Geoff Gray – lead vocals, percussion (1968–73)
- Sharon Sims – lead vocals, percussion (1968–72)
- Rob Toth – keyboards (1968–70)
- Wayne Thomas – drums, piano, vocals (1968–72, 1989–91)
- Denise Caines – vocals (1969–70, 1973)
- Shauna Jensen – vocals (1970)
- Dave Allen – flute, sax (1969–70)
- Ross Jeffries – guitar (1969)
- John Russell – guitar, autoharp (1969–74)
- Dennis Moore – bass guitar (1969–70)
- Greg Higgs – bass guitar, vocals (1971–73)
- Billy Taylor – guitar (1971–74)
- Ted Atkinson – bass guitar (1973–74)
- Mick Meehan – guitar (1973)
- Jim Penson – drums (1973–74)
- Royston Johnson; - vocals (1973–74)
- Neale Johns – vocals (1973–74)
- Warren Ward – bass guitar (1973–74)
- Rob Askew – bass guitar (1989–91)
- Gordon Sheard – guitar (1989–91)
- Anna Medley – vocals (1989–91)
- David Clouston – keyboards (1991)

== Discography ==
=== Albums ===
List of Albums
| Title | Album details |
|---|---|
| How's Your Mother | Released: December 1970; Format: LP; Label: Violet's Holiday (SHVL 934365) |
| Reflections: The Festival File, Volume 13 | Released: 1989; Format: CD; Label: Festival Records |

=== Singles ===
List of singles, with selected chart positions
| Year | Title | Peak chart positions |
| Year | Title | AUS |
|---|---|---|
| 1970 | "This Wheel's on Fire" | 21 |
| 1971 | "Reflections of My Life" | 25 |
| 1971 | "Life is Getting Better" | 40 |
| 1971 | "Under the Silent Tree" | 60 |
| 1972 | "Where Are You?" | - |
| 1974 | "Scotch on the Rocks" | - |
