= Reflections of My Life =

1969 single by Marmalade

Single by Marmalade

from the album Reflections of the Marmalade
- B-side: "Rollin' My Thing"
- Released: 14 November 1969; March 1970 (U.S.)
- Recorded: 20–22 October 1969
- Studio: Decca Studio 2 West Hampstead, London
- Genre: Pop rock
- Length: 4:16
- Label: Decca
- Songwriters: Junior Campbell; Dean Ford
- Producer: The Marmalade

Marmalade singles chronology
"Butterfly" (1969)	"Reflections of My Life" (1969)	"Rainbow" (1970)

"Reflections of My Life" was a 1969/1970 hit single for the Scottish band, Marmalade. It was written by their lead guitarist Junior Campbell and singer Dean Ford (credited to his birth name, Thomas McAleese). Released in late 1969, it was the band's first release on Decca following an earlier spell at CBS.

The song went on to chart worldwide, reaching number three in the UK in 1969, No. 10 in the US in 1970 on the Billboard Hot 100, and No. 7 on the Cash Box Top 100. Initial sales were significant in both countries, and the one million mark was reported in November 1971, when the group was presented with a gold disc for global sales. The track featured a lead vocal by Ford backed by vocal harmonies, and included a reverse tape guitar solo (backmasking) by Campbell.

"Reflections of My Life" has produced sales of over two million units. In 1998 the writers were awarded a Special Citation of Achievement by the BMI for attaining radio broadcast performances in excess of one million in the US alone.

== Recording ==
Original 1970 Decca release promo for "Reflections of My Life"

The recording took place over three days in October 1969 at Decca Studios 2 and 1 in West Hampstead London with band members Graham Knight on bass, Alan Whitehead on drums, Pat Fairley on acoustic guitar, and Junior Campbell on keyboards and electric guitars. Dean Ford sang lead vocal and Junior Campbell and Graham Knight provided harmony vocals.

The added brass and strings were orchestrated by Keith Mansfield. "Reflections of My Life" was released on 14 November 1969 in the UK. The Decca staff recording engineers were Bill Price and Peter Rynston.

=== Credits ===
- Dean Ford – lead vocals
- Junior Campbell – harmony vocals, electric guitar, keyboards
- Graham Knight – harmony vocals, bass guitar
- Patrick Fairley – acoustic guitar
- Alan Whitehead – drums
- Keith Mansfield – brass and string arrangements

== Structure ==
The song structure is unusual in that the intro, verses and choruses all share the same 8-bar sequence, reminiscent of the Beatles' "A Day in the Life". The chord sequence is: G, Bm, Em, G7, C, G/B, Am, D7 repeated throughout.

== Guitar solo ==
"Reflections of My Life" US Sheet Music Cover 1970

The guitar solo in "Reflections of My Life", often referred to as "reverse" guitar solo, was a sixteen bar (measure) sequence featured in the recording by Junior Campbell, the band's lead guitarist.

The song is in the key of G major and the solo was recorded thus:

The first 4 bars were recorded as normal, with Campbell playing a long "G" note, tied over from the last beat of bar 3, through bar 4, with slight feedback sustaining the long note.

The eight track tape was then turned over, and Campbell played against the reverse sound of the track, including his initial first four bars ensuring that he played another long "G" near the same point which could be cross-faded against the original – the tape was then turned over to normal setup, and he selected just 4 bars from the reverse recording which are bars 4–7 inclusive – this was cross-faded with the original at bar 4 – he then picked up from bar 8 through to bar 16 as normal, so in fact, only 4 bars are actually "reversed".

The solo was played on his left-handed Gibson Stereo ES345 using a Sound City stack.

== Chart performance ==
=== Weekly charts ===
Chart (1969–1970)	Peak position
Australia	47
Canada Top Singles (RPM)	6
Belgium (Ultratop 50 Flanders)	9
Ireland (IRMA)	2
Netherlands (Single Top 100)	9
New Zealand (Listener)	13
Norway (VG-lista)	8
South Africa (Springbok)	5
UK Singles (Official Charts)	3
US Billboard Hot 100	10
US Billboard Easy Listening	21
US Cash Box Top 100	7
West Germany (GfK)	20

=== Year-end charts ===
Chart (1970)	Rank
Canada	85
Netherlands	91
U.S. Billboard Hot 100	43
U.S. Cash Box	29

== Cover versions ==
- The Australian band Flake recorded the song in 1970. It charted regionally in Adelaide and Sydney, where it reached No.10; as well as settling in as a top 40 hit on the Go-Set National Top 60 in January 1971. Marmalade's original had peaked at No.47.
- The Canadian band "The Boss" reached #23 on the RPM AC charts with their version in 1981.
- Ruddy Thomas included a reggae rendition on his 1983 album [Reggae By Ruddy Thomas. It was a duet with Barry Biggs, who also arranged and co-produced the song. It was released as a single in 1983 and reached No.25 in the Netherlands.
