= Rainbow (The Marmalade song) =

1970 single by the Marmalade

- Cover of the single released in the Netherlands

Single by The Marmalade
- B-side: "The Ballad of Cherry Flavar"
- Released: 19 June 1970
- Genre: Folk rock; bubblegum pop
- Length: 3:17
- Label: Decca; London
- Songwriters: Junior Campbell; Thomas McAleese
- Producer: Junior Campbell

The Marmalade singles chronology
"Reflections of My Life" (1969)	"Rainbow" (1970)	"My Little One" (1971)

"Rainbow" is a song by Scottish rock band the Marmalade, released as a single in June 1970. It peaked at number 3 on the UK Singles Chart.

== Reception ==
"Rainbow" was the follow-up single to the UK top-three and US top-ten single "Reflections of My Life". Billboard wrote that "this folk flavored rhythm ballad follow up has all the sales and chart potency of the recent smash". Cash Box wrote that the "Deep brown bass line, Hollies-like harmonies, and some warm mouth harp work add up to a dynamite summer sales package".

In 2002, Robin Carmody of Freaky Trigger described the harmonica-led "Rainbow" as "a desperately poignant final aim for a love (or rather, perhaps, a feeling of personal contentment) fading inexorably, desperately looking out to feel it as it dies", concluding that it is "a wonderful song of yearning, and is the perfect farewell to the dying 20 years of shared national innocence." He further named it among ten British bubblegum pop classics, writing that "[s]ome of the greatest Britgummers let go of their jollity and breathe pure melancholia and, at heart, deep sadness."

== Personnel ==
- Dean Ford – lead vocals, harmonica
- Junior Campbell – guitar, backing vocals
- Pat Fairley – guitar, bass
- Graham Knight – bass
- Alan Whitehead – drums

== Charts ==
Chart (1970)	Peak position
Belgium (Ultratop 50 Wallonia)	41
Canada Top Singles (RPM)	36
Germany (GfK)	21
Ireland (IRMA)	4
Malaysia (Radio Malaysia)	5
Netherlands (Dutch Top 40)	10
Netherlands (Single Top 100)	8
Singapore (Rediffusion)	1
South Africa (Springbok Radio)	13
UK Singles (Official Charts)	3
US Billboard Hot 100	51
US Easy Listening (Billboard)	7
US Cash Box Top 100	48
