= Hallelujah Freedom =

Single by Junior Campbell
- A-side: "Hallelujah Freedom"
- B-side: "Alright With Me"
- Released: October 1972
- Recorded: September 1972
- Studio: Decca, London
- Label: Deram
- Songwriter(s): Junior Campbell

Junior Campbell singles chronology
"Goodbye Baby Jane" (1971)	"Hallelujah Freedom" (1972)	"Sweet Illusion" (1973)

"Hallelujah Freedom" is a song written and recorded by Junior Campbell in September 1972.

The recording took place at Decca Studio 2 in London in September 1972 and featured Campbell on lead vocal, piano, guitar & electric piano, with Ray Duffy on drums, Graham Knight (ex The Marmalade colleague of Campbell's) on bass. The alto sax solo was performed by Pete Zorn.

The backing vocals were performed by Barry St. John, Doris Troy and Campbell himself. The recording was engineered by John Burns - Decca staff engineer and went on to win the award, best recorded British single of 1972.

"Hallelujah Freedom" was released 29 September 1972 on Deram DM 364 entering the UK Singles Chart 14 October 1972. The record spent 9 weeks on the chart reaching number 10 position. Hallelujah Freedom was also successful in the Netherlands, France & Germany.
