= Junior Campbell =

Scottish composer and musician (born 1947)

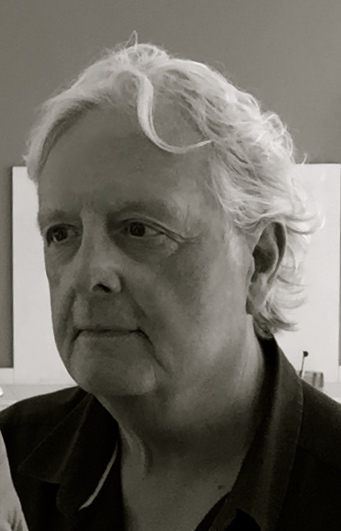
- Campbell pictured in May 2016

Background information
- Born: William Campbell Jr. 31 May 1947 (age 79)
- Origin: Parkhead, Glasgow, Scotland
- Genres: Pop; rock; blue-eyed soul; film score
- Occupations: Musician, singer-songwriter, musical arranger, record producer, film composer
- Instruments: Guitar, piano, vocals
- Years active: 1961–present
- Labels: CBS, Decca, Deram, Rocket, Private Stock, Sanctuary, BMG Rights Management

Junior Campbell (born William Campbell Jr.; 31 May 1947) is a Scottish composer, songwriter and musician. He was a founding member, lead guitarist, pianist, and singer with the Scottish band Marmalade and co-wrote and produced some of their biggest successes, including "Reflections of My Life", "I See the Rain" and "Rainbow".

Reflections of My Life has produced sales of over two million units. In 1998 Campbell and co-writer Dean Ford (Thomas McAleese) were awarded a Special Citation of Achievement by the BMI for attaining radio broadcast performances in excess of one million in the US alone. He also wrote and produced his own solo hits, "Hallelujah Freedom" and "Sweet Illusion" and "Carolina Days".

Campbell is also known for composing music for film and television drama, and as an arranger and producer for many musicians including Barbara Dickson. He is also known for co-composing the music and co-writing the lyrics for 182 episodes and 31 songs of the children's TV series Thomas & Friends from 1983–2003, including “Thomas’ Anthem”, "The Island Song", "Really Useful Engine", "The Snow Song" and "Accidents Will Happen", and also composing the music for Tugs, a 13 part children's television series from the same production crew as Thomas.

== Early life ==
Campbell was born in Glasgow, Scotland. He grew up in Springboig, in the east end of Glasgow, and was educated at Thorntree Primary in Greenfield and Eastbank Academy in Shettleston. His paternal grandfather Alfredo Cancellari was an Italian immigrant born near Lucca, Italy, who changed his surname to Campbell in the early 1900s when he settled in Scotland.

== Career ==
=== Marmalade: 1961-1971 ===
Campbell joined Pat Fairley to form the Gaylords, on his 14th birthday in May 1961 (later to become Dean Ford and the Gaylords, then Marmalade in 1966), acting as lead guitarist, piano player, and singer.

With Marmalade, Campbell co-wrote and produced the multi-million-selling "Reflections of My Life", "Rainbow" and "I See The Rain", amongst others, in a line of hits from 1967 to 1971. Campbell's reverse tape guitar solo on "Reflections of My Life" and "I See the Rain" are particularly noteworthy – the latter was Jimi Hendrix's favourite cut of 1967.

Noel Gallagher has quoted I See The Rain is in the top 10 of his all time favourite songs and on his curated NME/iTunes playlist, praising it as "Another lost 60's psychedelic classic" and highlighting its guitar solo

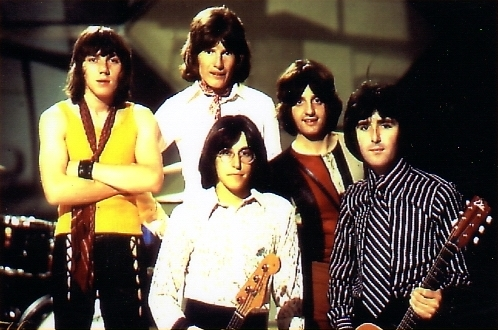
with Marmalade (2nd from right) in 1968

During his years with Marmalade, the band used Keith Mansfield as an orchestral arranger on all of their first record successes with CBS, including "Loving Things", "Wait For Me Mary Ann", "Obladi Oblada", "Baby Make It Soon" and also "Reflections of My Life", when the band moved to Decca, and Campbell studied Mansfield's scores at close range, was so impressed with the craft of arranging for orchestra, and the sound and expertise of orchestral musicians in the recording studio, that this led to a major turning point in his career, so much so, he then commenced arranging orchestral accompaniment on the band's sessions himself.

Campbell was the main songwriting partner for lead singer Dean Ford until he departed Marmalade in March 1971, and by their next album "Songs" (November 1971), Ford only wrote two songs.

=== Solo career and composing: 1971-present ===
During the 1970s, Campbell had two self-penned solo records released, both of which, "Hallelujah Freedom" (#9) (1972), (with Doris Troy on backing vocals), and "Sweet Illusion" (#15) (1973), made Top 20 chart appearances in the UK Singles Chart.

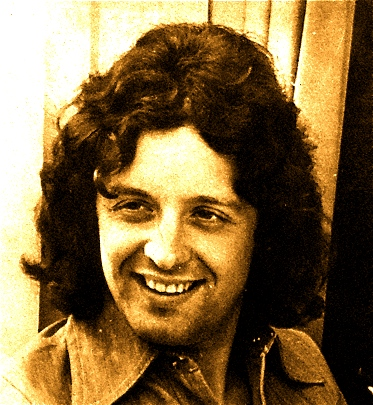
1970's Deram Records promo pic during solo recording career

Campbell then went on to study orchestration and composition with Eric Gilder and Max Saunders at the Royal College of Music and became an arranger and record producer for many artists as diverse as Miller Anderson, (Bright City, 1971), Matthews Southern Comfort, Barry Ryan, The Tremeloes, Freddie Starr and Barbara Dickson, arranging and producing her first hit single and album, "Answer Me". He also arranged and conducted Dickson's performances in her first-season run on the BBC Television series The Two Ronnies in 1976.

Campbell has composed music for television drama and film, including the 1989 war film That Summer of White Roses (starring Tom Conti, Rod Steiger, Susan George, and Alun Armstrong); the 1993 fantasy film Merlin: The True Story (aka October 32nd, starring Nadia Cameron-Blakey, James Hong, Richard Lynch and Rodney Wood) and the 1994 BBC Worldwide Television drama BAFTA winner Taking Over the Asylum, which starred Ken Stott, David Tennant and Elizabeth Spriggs.

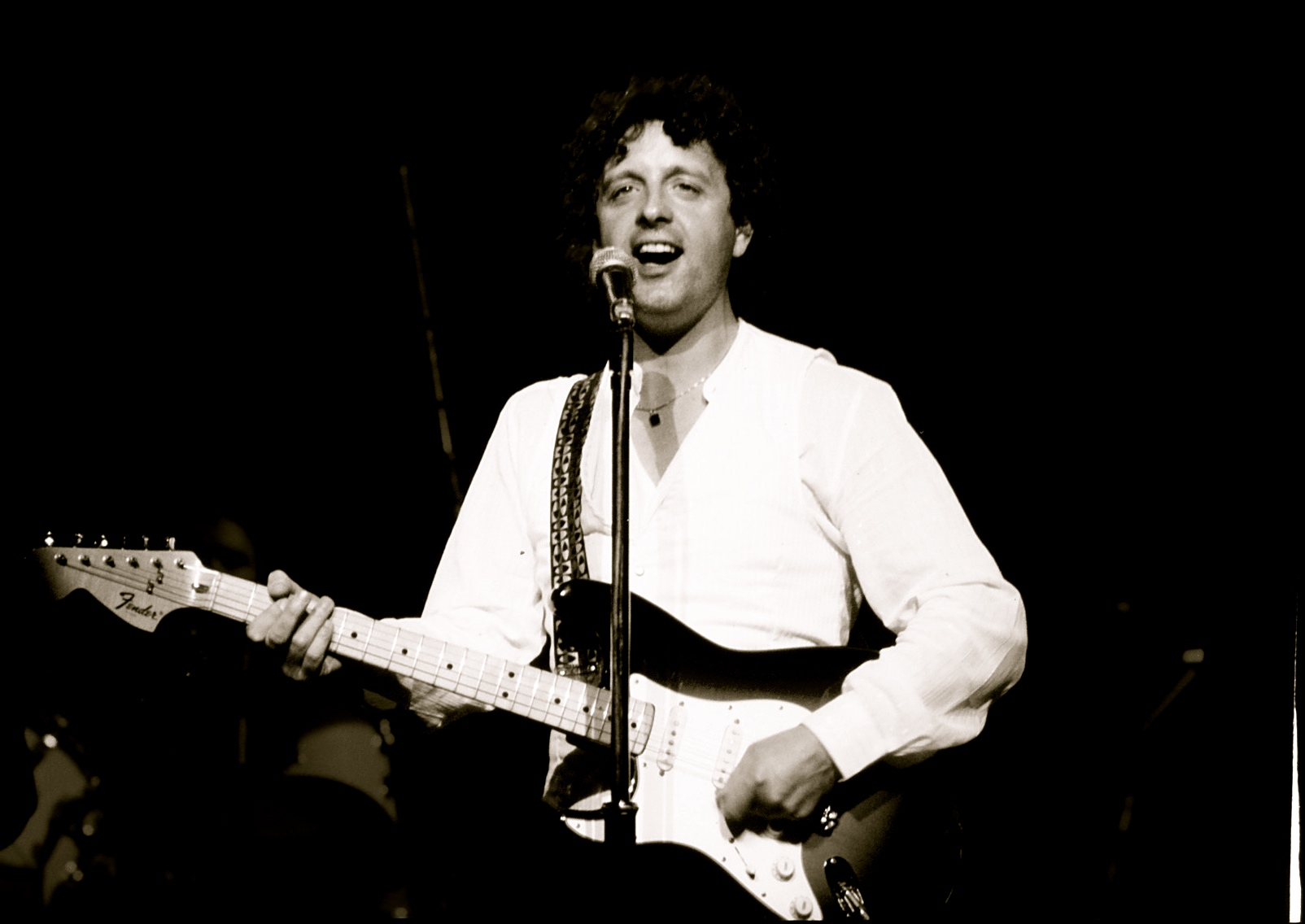
Campbell playing custom made Fender left hand guitar with reverse stringing, circa 1982

Campbell also composed the music for the 1998 BBC Television adaptation of the Minette Walters murder mystery The Scold's Bridle, starring Miranda Richardson, Bob Peck, Siân Phillips, Douglas Hodge, Trudie Styler, and Beth Winslet.

Campbell co-wrote the music and lyrics for the internationally successful children's TV series Thomas the Tank Engine & Friends with Mike O'Donnell, composing all music and songs during the classic period of Thomas from 1984–2003, but when ownership of the production changed hands in 2003 after series 7, O'Donnell and Campbell departed the series after becoming embroiled in what proved to be a protracted legal dispute in a claim to recover substantial historic royalties with HIT Entertainment, the new owners. For series 7, their final series, all 26 episodes had the original music in the British version, while only 7 episodes of the series would have the O'Donnell/Campbell music in the American version, as most of the music in the American version of that series was re-done by series 8's new composer Robert Hartshrone, whose music was also used in 21 episodes of the series's British version. Campbell and O'Donnell also wrote the soundtrack for the TV series TUGS in 1989.

In November 2013, Junior Campbell – The Very Best Of .... Back Then was released through Union Square Music. It was a 32 track compilation album available for digital download.

=== Later career ===
Campbell later focused on composition and production, while his earlier songwriting continued to feature on retrospective compilations of British pop music. His solo recordings from the period after Marmalade were also reissued in collections.

Campbell and Mike O'Donnell composed the music and songs for Thomas the Tank Engine and Friends from its early years until 2003. They also composed the music for TUGS. Their work included theme tunes and songs for both programmes, as well as music for television dramas and films.

"In January 2022, Campbell discussed his career in a two-part interview with The Strange Brew. The interviews covered his time with Marmalade, his solo recordings, his work with singer Barbara Dickson, his compositions for Thomas the Tank Engine and Friends, and his television and film music.

=== Awards and recognition ===
In 1998, Campbell and Dean Ford received a Special Citation of Achievement from Broadcast Music, Inc. (BMI) for their song "Reflections of My Life", which had exceeded one million radio performances in the United States.

== Personal life ==
Campbell lives near Horsham in Sussex with his wife Susie.

== Discography ==
=== Solo ===
==== Singles ====
Title	Cat no.	Release date
"Goodbye Baby Jane" c/w "If I Call Your Name"	Deram DM 344	October 1971
"Hallelujah Freedom" c/w "Alright With Me"	Deram DM 364	October 1972
"Sweet Illusion" c/w "Ode To Karen"	Deram DM 387	June 1973
"Reach Out (An' Help Your Fellow Man )" c/w "Pretty Belinda"	Deram DM 403	October 1973
"Sweet Lady Love" c/w "If I Could Believe You Darlin'"	Deram DM 414	May 1974
"Ol Virginia" c/w "Wullie Sings The Blues"	Deram DM 424	October 1974
"Carabino Lady" c/w "Southern Man"	Rocket ROKN 509	April 1976
“Here Comes The Band” c/w “Pick Up”	Rocket ROKN 514	August 1976
"Baby Hold On" c/w "Long Long Road"	Rocket ROKN 518	January 1977
"Highland Girl" c/w "Climb on Board"	Private Stock Records 141	February 1978
"America" c/w "Radio Man"	Private Stock Records 171	September 1978

- All songs written by Junior Campbell – except "Baby Hold On" (co-written with Len (Chip) Hawkes)

==== Albums ====
- Second Time Around – 1974 – Deram Records SML 1106
- Second Time Around – 2001 – Sanctuary Records CMDDD 398 compilation containing original Deram album and all Deram/Private Stock singles, plus selection of previously unreleased tracks.

=== Dean Ford and the Gaylords ===
==== Singles ====
Title	Cat No.	Release date
"Twenty Miles" c/w "What's The Matter With Me"	Columbia DB7264	April 1964
"Mr Heartbreak's Here Instead" c/w "I Won't"	Columbia DB7402	November 1964
"The Name Game" c/w "That Lonely Feeling"	Columbia DB7610	June 1965
"He's A Good Face (But He's Down And Out)" c/w "You Know It Too"	Columbia DB7805	December 1965

=== Marmalade ===
==== Singles ====
Year	Title (Songwriters)	UK Singles Chart	US Billboard Hot 100 Chart	US Adult Contemporary
1966	"Its All Leading up to Saturday Night" (Geoff Stephens)	-	-	-
1966	"Can't Stop Now" (Kelleher/Fitzpatrick/Wood)	-	-	-
1967	"I See The Rain" (William Campbell/Thomas McAleese)	-	-	-
1967	"Man in a Shop" (William Campbell/Thomas McAleese)	-	-	-
1968	"Lovin' Things" (Jet Loring/Artie Schroeck)	#6	-	-
1968	"Wait For Me Mary-Anne" (Alan Blaikley/Ken Howard)	#30	-	-
1968	"Ob-La-Di, Ob-La-Da" (Lennon/McCartney)	#1	-	-
1969	"Baby Make It Soon" (Tony Macaulay)	#9	-	-
1969	"Butterfly" (Barry Gibb/Maurice Gibb/Robin Gibb)	-	-	-
1969	"Reflections of My Life" (William Campbell/Thomas McAleese)	#3	#10	-
1970	"Rainbow" (William Campbell/Thomas McAleese)	#3	#51	#7
1971	"My Little One" (William Campbell/Thomas McAleese)	#15	-	-
1971	"Cousin Norman" (Hugh Nicholson) *Label credit as musical arranger	#6	-	-

==== Albums ====
- There's a Lot of it About – 1968
- Reflections of the Marmalade – 1970

=== Thomas & Friends ===
Title	Series no.	Release date
Thomas’ Anthem	3	30 December 1991 (JP)
Let’s Have A Race	4	4 October 1993 (UK, Cassette)
Gone Fishing	4	4 October 1993 (UK, Cassette)
Toby	4	4 October 1993 (UK, Cassette)
Don’t Judge A Book By Its Cover	4	4 October 1993 (UK, Cassette); 15 August 1995 (US, VHS)
The Island Song	4	4 October 1993 (UK, Cassette)
Really Useful Engine	4	4 October 1993 (UK, Cassette)
Rules and Regulations	4	4 October 1993 (UK, Cassette, no music video)
That’s What Friends Are For	4	4 October 1993 (UK, Cassette, no music video)
Night Train	5	5 October 1998 (UK, Cassette)
It’s Great To Be An Engine	5	5 October 1998 (UK, Cassette)
Every Cloud Has A Silver Lining	5	5 October 1998 (UK, Cassette)
Donald’s Duck	5	5 October 1998 (UK, Cassette)
Sir Topham Hatt	5	5 October 1998 (UK, Cassette)
Harold The Helicopter	5	5 October 1998 (UK, Cassette)
Come For The Ride	5	5 October 1998 (UK, Cassette)
Percy’s Seaside Trip	5	5 October 1998 (UK, Cassette)
Accidents Will Happen	5	5 October 1998 (UK, Cassette)
The Snow Song	5	5 October 1998 (UK, Cassette)
James The Really Splendid Engine	6	17 September 2002 (US, CD)
Winter Wonderland	6	17 September 2002 (US, CD)
Little Engines	6	17 September 2002 (US, CD)
Down By The Docks	6	17 September 2002 (US, CD)
Boo! Boo! Choo-Choo	6	17 September 2002 (US, CD)
Never Never Never Give Up	6	17 September 2002 (US, CD)
Five New Engines In The Shed	7	16 March 2004 (US, Music Video)
The Red Balloon	7	25 January 2005 (US, Music Video)
There Once Was An Engine Who Ran Away	7	26 July 2005 (US, Music Video)
Troublesome Trucks	7	7 February 2006 (US, Music Video)
Salty	7	20 June 2007 (JP)
The Whistle Song	7	20 June 2007 (JP)

- All songs co-written and co-composed by Mike O’Donnell

== Other sources ==
- Discography ref Record Collector issue No. 186 (February 1995)
- Liner notes Second Time Around – 2001 – Sanctuary Records CMDDD 398
