= I See the Rain =

Single by The Marmalade

from the album There’s A Lot Of It About
- B-side: "Laughing Man"
- Released: 25 August 1967
- Recorded: CBS Studio New Bond St London
- Genre: Psychedelic pop
- Length: 4:05
- Label: CBS Records
- Songwriters: Junior Campbell, Dean Ford
- Producer: Mike Smith

The Marmalade singles chronology
"Can’t Stop Now" (1966)	"I See the Rain" (1967)	"Man In A Shop" (1967)

"I See the Rain" is a 1967 song by the Scottish rock band the Marmalade, written by lead guitarist William Junior Campbell and vocalist Dean Ford.

Released as a single on 25 August 1967, "I See the Rain" was the band's third release on CBS Records, following their 1966 name change from Dean Ford and the Gaylords. The record was Jimi Hendrix's favourite cut of 1967.

Noel Gallagher has quoted I See The Rain is in the top 10 of his all time favourite songs and on his curated NME/iTunes playlist, praising it as "Another lost 60's psychedelic classic" and highlighting its guitar solo

The single charted for five weeks on the Dutch Top 40, peaking at number 23. It did not chart in the UK, but it has since attained a cult following. Canadian group the Great Flood made the RPM Top Singles Chart with their version, entering the chart on June 29 1968, and peaking at number 83 two weeks later. Susanna Hoffs and Matthew Sweet included a cover version on their 2006 covers album Under the Covers, Vol. 1.

The Marmalade's original recording was used in a 2002 Gap Inc. television advertisement directed by the Coen brothers and featuring Dennis Hopper and Christina Ricci.

Studio Recording - CBS Studios 73 New Bond St London July 1967

Personnel

Dean Ford lead vocal

Junior Campbell lead guitar vocal harmony

Graham Knight bass guitar vocal harmony

Pat Fairley 6 string Danelectro 58 Longhorn Baritone bass

Alan Whitehead drums

Producer Mike Smith .... Studio Engineer Mike Ross

Junior Campbell played a left handed Gibson ES-345 Stereo using a Sola Sound Tone Bender MKII Professional through a Vox AC30 Top Boost

Thunder and rain weather effects were added to the track intro and outro utilising the BBC Sound Effects Library available in 1967
