= Dean Ford =

Scottish musician (1945–2018)

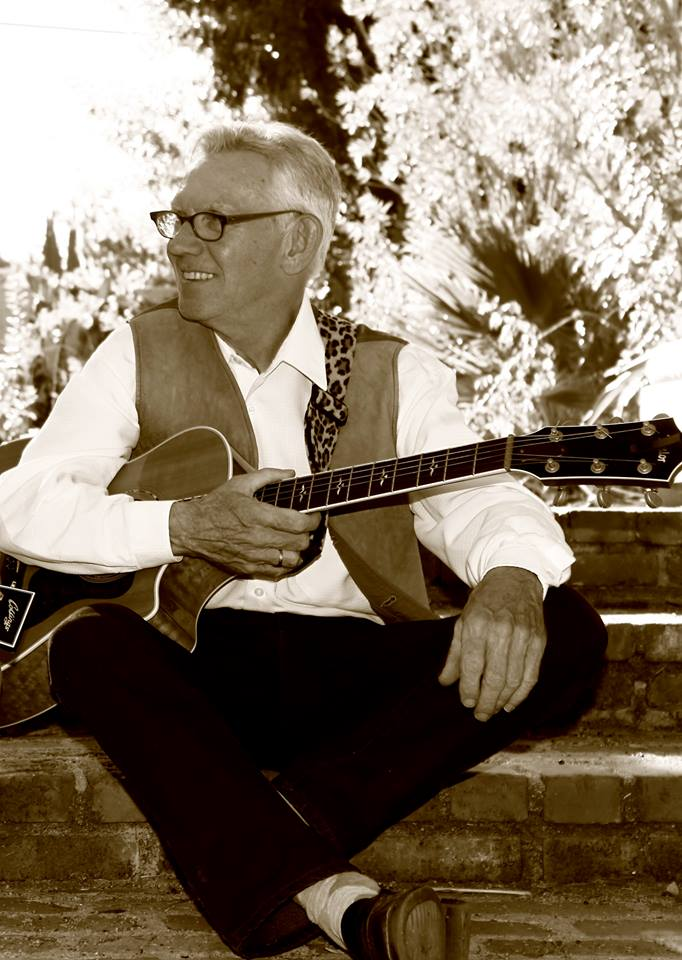

Background information
- Born: Thomas McAleese; 5 September 1945; Airdrie, North Lanarkshire, Scotland
- Origin: Coatbridge, North Lanarkshire, Scotland
- Died: 31 December 2018 (aged 73) Los Angeles, California, United States
- Genres: Pop, rock
- Occupations: Singer, songwriter
- Years active: 1963–2018
- Labels: EMI Columbia, CBS, Decca, EMI
- Website: Official Facebook

Dean Ford (born Thomas McAleese; 5 September 1945 – 31 December 2018) was a Scottish singer and songwriter best known for his tenure as lead vocalist and frontman of the beat pop group Marmalade from 1966 to 1974. Ford (credited as McAleese) co-wrote the group's worldwide hit "Reflections of My Life" with fellow band member Junior Campbell. "Reflections of My Life" has sold more than two million units globally, and in 1998 the writers were awarded a Special Citation of Achievement by BMI for attaining radio broadcast performances in excess of one million in the U.S. alone.

== Career ==
=== Early life ===
Born in Airdrie, North Lanarkshire, to Thomas and Elizabeth McAleese, young Tom first began singing in public accompanying a jazz ensemble at the local Whifflet parish church dance hall. He formed his first musical group The Tonebeats at age 13, one of several he hooked up with during his teenage years. By the time he left Clifton High School in Coatbridge at age 15, he had been gaining more exposure as a featured singer. His break came after a performance with the Monarchs at the Barrowland Ballroom in Glasgow in 1963, where he was seen by Junior Campbell and Pat Fairley of the popular east Glasgow band The Gaylords and subsequently invited to join the group.

=== Dean Ford and The Gaylords ===
Shortly thereafter, McAleese adopted his stage name (a moniker he coined by combining the names Dean Martin and Tennessee Ernie Ford) and The Gaylords were re-christened Dean Ford and the Gaylords. With hopes of achieving more commercial success, Ford and the band relocated to London in 1965, changing the band name to The Marmalade in early 1966.

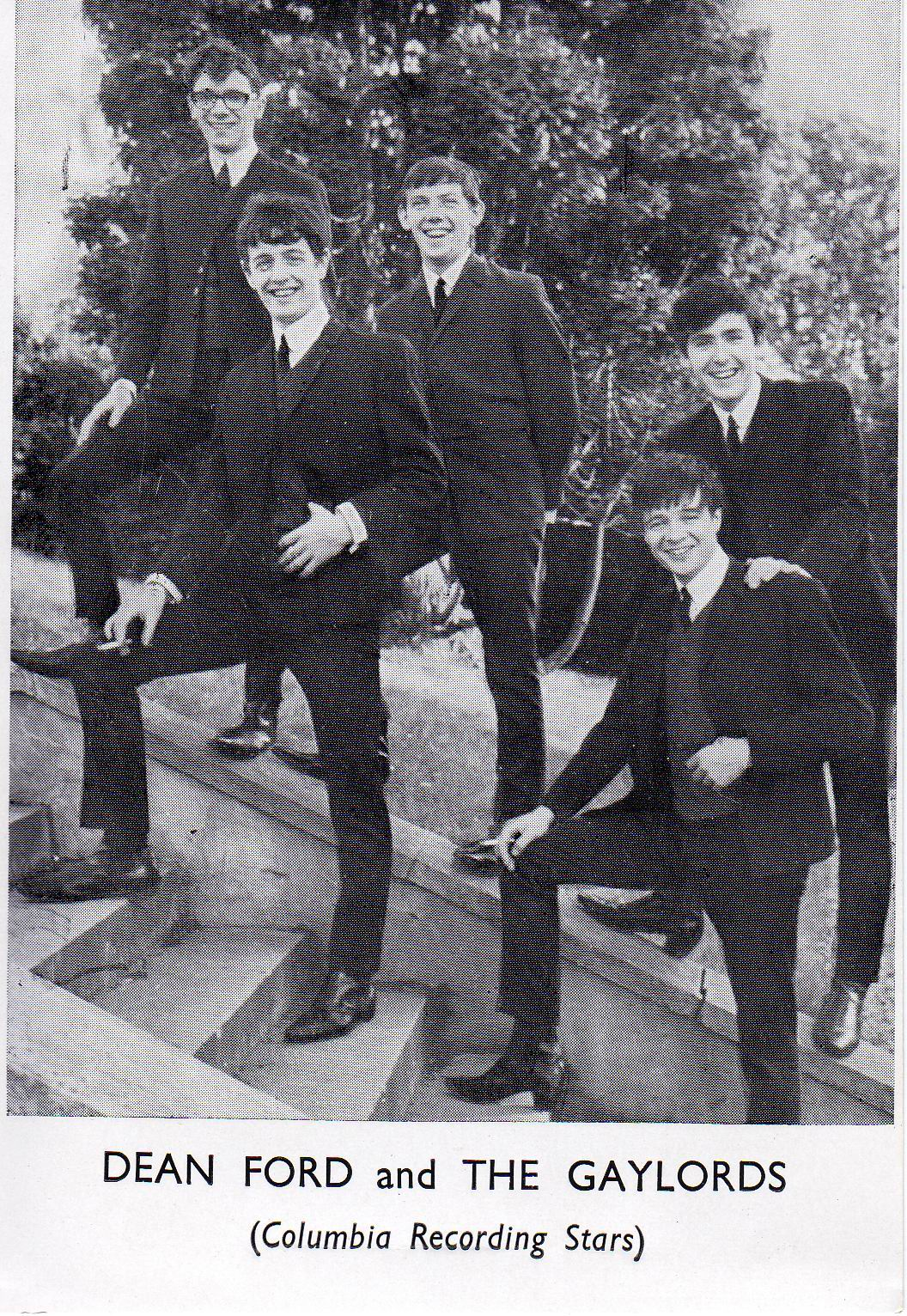

=== Marmalade ===
Three years later, Marmalade, with Ford as lead singer, became the first Scottish band to score a No. 1 hit on the UK Singles Chart, also racking up ten other consecutive quality hits worldwide. In addition to his lead vocals, Ford expanded his songwriting credits, co-writing "Reflections of My Life", "Rainbow", "My Little One", and "I See the Rain" and added instrumental support on guitar, harmonica and tambourine.

After several lineup changes, Marmalade was reduced to three band members by 1973, with Ford's being the lone founding member.

=== Post Marmalade career ===
With the dissolution of the original Marmalade, Ford embarked on a solo career and released a self-titled LP in 1975, produced by Alan Parsons. His collaboration with Parsons extended to a guest vocal appearance on Parsons' 1978 Pyramid album. Ford also recorded one-off tracks with former Marmalade band member Hugh Nicholson.

=== Career in the U.S. ===
After his solo album failed to chart, Ford was subsequently released by his record label. Battling alcohol addiction, he moved to Los Angeles in 1979. Virtually unknown as a recording artist in the U.S., he was unable to cash in on his earlier success with Marmalade and his alcohol dependency forced him to essentially drop out of the organized music business. With the help of Alcoholics Anonymous, Ford was sober by 1986.

Ford did not completely sever ties to his musical contemporaries. In 2003 he teamed up with a revamped The Sensational Alex Harvey Band, participating in an album tribute by well-known Scottish musicians to Glaswegian Frankie Miller, a fellow artist recovering from a brain hemorrhage. His most recent collaboration was with former Badfinger guitarist Joe Tansin in 2012, including recording a notable latter day version of his biggest success, "Reflections of My Life".

With the support of crowdfunding, Ford completed production of a second solo album of original material entitled Feel My Heartbeat. in 2017.

He released an album called My Scottish Heart, two months before his demise.

Ford's solo projects are currently available on CD through his official Facebook page.

== Death ==
Ford died in Los Angeles on 31 December 2018, at the age of 73 from complications relating to Parkinson's disease. His death was announced by his daughter, Tracey McAleese-Gorman, who described him as 'a gentle soul and great father'. His daughter died less than two years later in November 2020 in London.

== Birth year ==
There has been some confusion regarding Ford's birth year being listed widely as 1946. This appears to be disputed by his sister who gives his year of birth as 1945 on a memorial plaque inscription placed on 5 September 2020 in his hometown of Coatbridge.

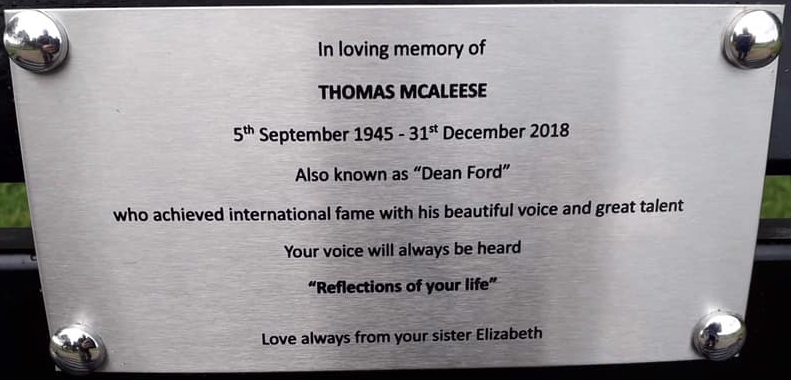

A search of the Scotlands People Statutory Registers shows a Thomas McAleese born in 1945 in Airdrie. There is no record of a Thomas McAleese being born anywhere in Scotland in 1946.

== Discography ==
- Dean Ford (1975)
- "Radio Heart" / "Let It Rain" (2010)
- Feel My Heartbeat
- My Scottish Heart (2019)

== Notable songwriting credits ==
Year	Song	Author	Chart Position
1967	"I See the Rain"	Campbell-McAleese	No. 23 Netherlands
1969	"Reflections of My Life"	Campbell-McAleese	No. 3 UK, No. 7 US-Cashbox, No. 10 US, No. 21 US-AC
1970	"Rainbow"	Campbell-McAleese	No. 3 UK, No. 7 US-AC, No. 51 US
1971	"My Little One"	Campbell-McAleese	No. 15 UK, No. 31 US-AC, No. 123 US
