= Alan Whitehead (drummer) =

British musician and businessman

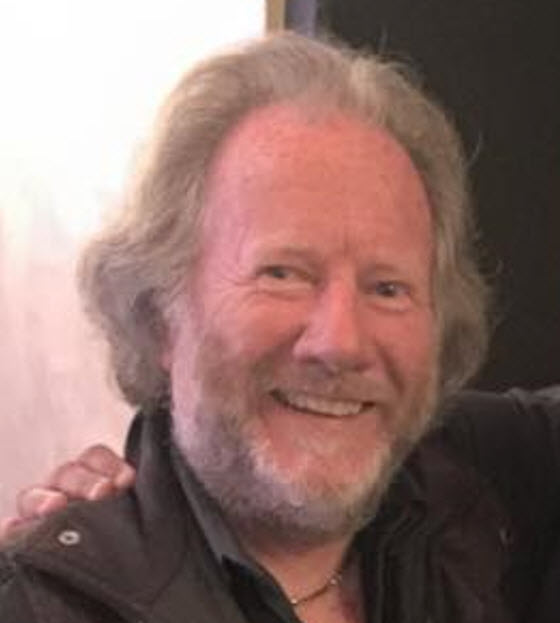
- Alan Whitehead

Background information
- Born: 24 July 1945 (age 80); Oswestry, England
- Genres: Rock
- Occupations: Drummer, music manager
- Instrument: Drums
- Years active: 1966–present
- Formerly of: The Attack, Marmalade
- Website: https://www.TheRealAlanWhitehead.com

Alan James Whitehead (born 24 July 1945) is a British musician, businessman and author. He was a drummer for The Attack and Marmalade.

== Career ==
=== The Attack ===
He started his career in the music industry in 1966 as the drummer for Crispian St. Peters. Not long after, he formed the group The Attack, also in 1966, featuring guitarist and trumpeter David O'List (later of The Nice with Keith Emerson), Richard Sherman on vocals, Bob Hodges on piano and organ, Gerry Henderson on bass and Whitehead on drums.

They released four singles in all, three in 1966 "Try It" / "We Don't Know", "Hi Ho Silver Lining" / "Any More Than We Do", "Created by Clive" / "Colour of My Mind" and one in 1967, "Neville Thumbcatch" / "Lady Orange Peel".

Several compilation albums have been produced which featured the band, Magic in the Air in 1990, The Complete Recordings From 1967-68 in 1999, About Time! (The Definitive MOD-POP Collection 1967-1968) and Final Daze in 2019.

=== Marmalade ===
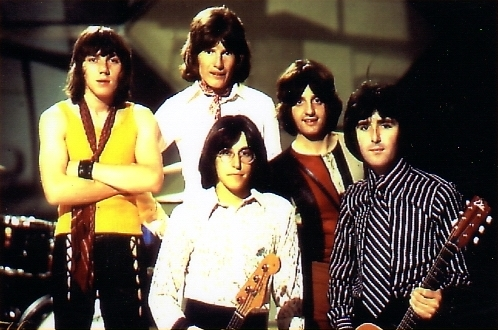
Whitehead (top middle) in 1968 with Marmalade

Although he has had a diverse music and business career, Whitehead is best known as a member of Marmalade, whose most successful single in the UK was a cover version of the Paul McCartney song "Ob-La-Di, Ob-La-Da". Released in November 1968, the single reached number one on the UK Singles Chart and topped the charts in several other countries.

Whitehead joined Marmalade while still performing with The Attack and working with Crispian St. Peters. Shortly before his arrival, the band had changed their name from Dean Ford and the Gaylords to Marmalade.

In a notable appearance on Top of the Pops in early 1969, the four Scottish members of the band wore traditional kilts, while Whitehead—originally from England—wore a red coat, visually marking him as the only non-Scottish member of the group.

Later in 1969, Marmalade signed with Decca Records, and released the song "Reflections of My Life", which became an international success. The single reached the Top 10 in the United States and remains one of the band's most recognisable songs. Marmalade continued their chart success with "Rainbow" in 1970, which peaked at number three on the UK Singles Chart.

Whitehead left the band in 1971, later rejoining in 1975 before departing permanently in 1978.

=== Management ===
After leaving Marmalade, Whitehead worked as a photographer for a while and set up his own management company, negotiating his first production contract with EMI Records. Groups that he successfully managed were Lipps Inc., Mel and Kim, Modern Romance and Rikki Peebles. He later went on to manage all-girl groups Amazulu and Belle Stars.

Whitehead continued in artist management and could be seen reviewing sports cars on the Together TV programme "Rock 'N' Roll Cars" (he also provides the voice-over for the show).

He ran Chubby Lama Management with Sasi Langford, representing the indie rock band Shoot the Preacher, who won The Global Song Writing Competition. He has also managed strip clubs.

== Personal life ==
In 1966, Whitehead was in a relationship with Maureen Wilson, an Anglo-Indian from Birmingham. After him she dated and married Robert Plant of Led Zeppelin.

In early 1970, he started a relationship with Swedish model called Leena Skoog and they married in July 1971 with press coverage. They were divorced two years later, although they remained good friends until her death in 1998 from ovarian cancer. In 1978 he married the actress Louise Burton..they were married for 17 years and have 2 sons Kurtis and Leo. While running a strip club in Newquay called Divas he met and married one of the dancers Gemma Ford. It was short-lived and they divorced a year later

In 2013, Whitehead appeared on an episode of Take Me Out, where he landed a date with a woman called Lia-Jay Holmes, who is forty years younger than Whitehead.

He currently lives in Thailand and was single until in 2021 when he met a Thai woman called Kwhanchai, known to everyone by her nickname of Kitty, who is thirty years his junior. They married in May 2022.
