= Marmalade (band) =

Scottish rock band

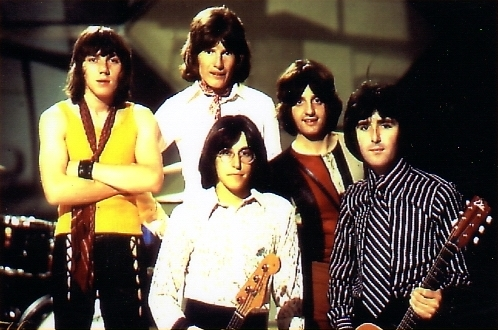
- Original band in 1968 l/r: Dean Ford, Alan Whitehead, Graham Knight, Junior Campbell and Pat Fairley

Background information
- Origin: Glasgow, Scotland
- Genres: Pop rock; pop; psychedelic pop; soft rock; folk-pop; sunshine pop
- Years active: 1966–present
- Labels: Columbia (UK), CBS Records, Decca, London, Target Records, Castle, Sanctuary, Union Square Music, BMG Rights Management

Marmalade are a Scottish pop rock band originating from the east end of Glasgow, originally formed in 1961 as the Gaylords, and then later billed as Dean Ford and the Gaylords, recording four singles for Columbia (EMI). In 1966, they changed the band's name to the Marmalade and were credited as such on all of their subsequent recorded releases with CBS Records and Decca Records until 1972. Their greatest chart success was between 1968 and 1972, placing ten songs on the UK Singles Chart, and many overseas territories, including international hits "Reflections of My Life", which reached No. 10 on the US Billboard Hot 100 Chart and No. 3 on the UK chart in January 1970, and "Ob-La-Di, Ob-La-Da", which topped the UK chart in January 1969, the group becoming the first-ever Scottish artist to top that chart.

The original members began to drift away in the early 1970s, resulting in the band departing Decca in 1972. In 1973, the first evolved line up of the band rejoined EMI Records and with their first record release became known simply as Marmalade. All subsequent record releases are credited similarly.

Graham Knight (an ongoing member from the pre-Marmalade "Dean Ford and the Gaylords" lineup) remained until September 2010. The band still exists, with none of the founding members, and many additional further evolved lineups including vocalist Sandy Newman, a member since 1975, touring the nostalgia circuit.

== History ==
=== The Gaylords ===
The Gaylords (named after the notorious post war Chicago Gaylords street gang) were originally formed by Pat Fairley and Billy Johnston in Baillieston, a suburb east of Glasgow, in 1961. Their initial line-up included Tommy Frew on drums and lead guitarist Pat McGovern, fronted by vocalist Wattie Rodgers. William Junior Campbell joined on his 14th birthday on 31 May 1961 replacing McGovern, and Rodgers was then himself replaced, initially by two new lead vocalists, Billy Reid and Tommy Scott, although Reid soon departed leaving Scott as the sole frontman. Bill Irving, from local Baillieston group the Cadillacs, then took over from Johnston on bass.

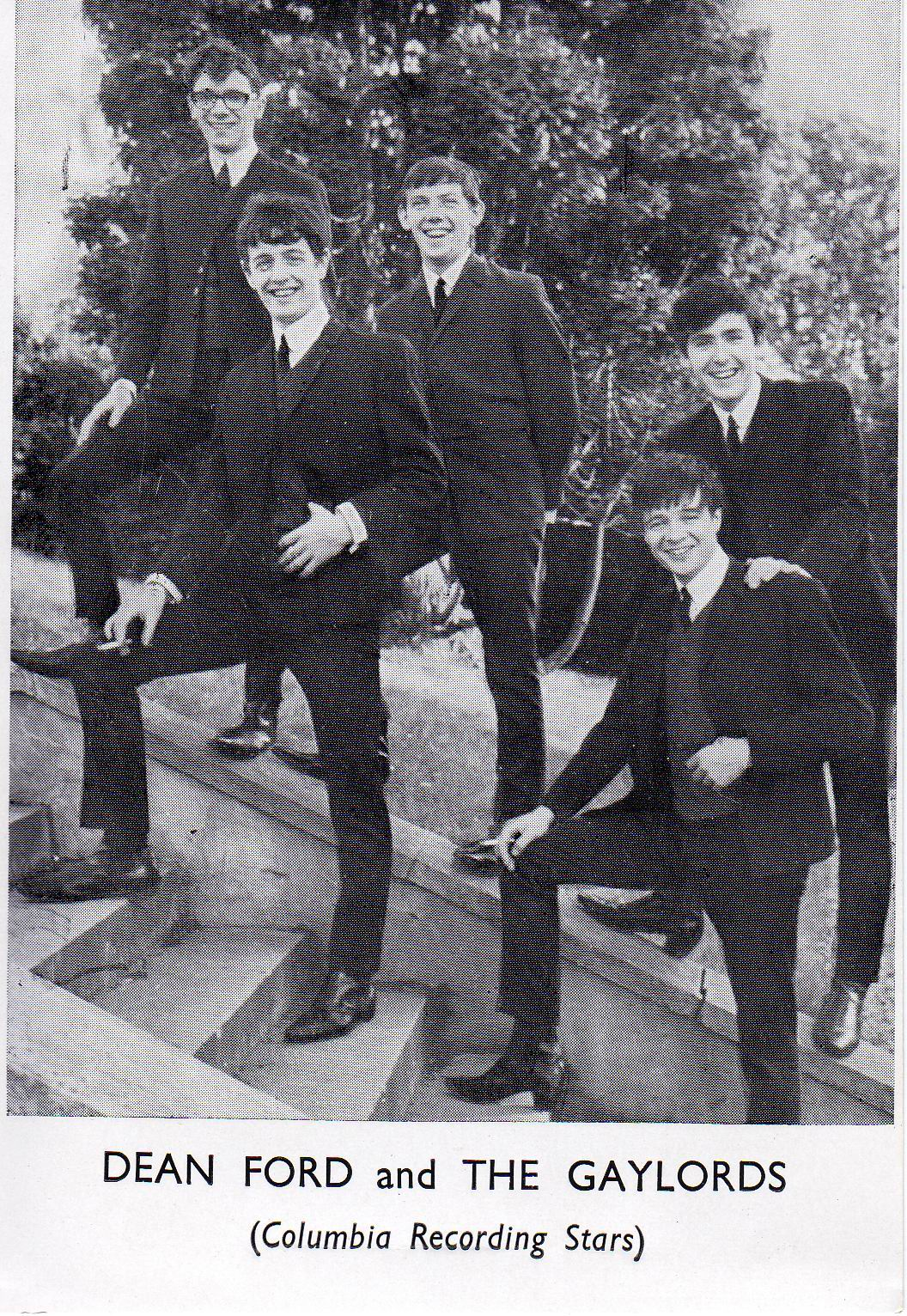
Left to right: Bill Irving, Junior Campbell, Dean Ford, Ray Duffy and Pat Fairley (1964)

The group began gathering notice and in 1963 Fairley and Campbell spotted Thomas McAleese, singer with local group the Monarchs, at the Barrowland Ballroom in Glasgow, and it was not long before he replaced Scott as lead singer. McAleese then adopted the stage moniker Dean Ford, and they then became known as Dean Ford and the Gaylords. Raymond Duffy, from Glasgow group the Escorts, then came in on drums after Frew departed. For a few months, they had an organist, Davey Hunter. By early 1965, Graham Knight, from the local group the Vampires, had displaced Irving on bass.

Becoming popular in Scotland, and under the management of Billy Grainger, in early 1964 they were championed by Scottish music journalist Gordon Reid, which led to them being signed to EMI's Columbia label by Norrie Paramor after auditions at Glasgow's Locarno Ballroom. They went on to record four singles, including a cover of the 1963 Chubby Checker US hit "Twenty Miles", which was a big seller locally but failed to chart nationally. The Columbia releases, although uncredited, were all produced by Bob Barratt, EMI staff producer, with Norrie Paramor as executive. Paramor played the celesta on "What's The Matter With Me"; the B-side of "Twenty Miles". In 1965, they played a long stint in Germany at the Storyville in Cologne and also in Duisburg. By this time the Gaylords had attained status as one of the top groups in Scotland, borne out in music poll results, but were ambitious, and so on their return from Germany to London in early 1965, they decided to try for success in the UK as a whole, and remained in London, where they changed management and agency representation, as Billy Grainger wished to remain in Glasgow.

=== Name change and the CBS era ===
On the recommendation of the Tremeloes, who had played with them in Glasgow, the Gaylords were invited to join the London-based agency Starlite Artistes, owned and managed by Peter Walsh. They then began to build up a club reputation as a tight, close harmony band and in 1966, finding themselves in the middle of the 1960s swinging London scene, they decided to update their image and instrumentation. On the advice of their new manager, they changed the band name to 'the Marmalade'. According to a 2009 interview with Graham Knight, the inspiration behind the Marmalade name came when their manager was eating breakfast and across from him was a jar of marmalade featuring a Golliwog on the label, their manager said "it were staring me in the face as I were having my breakfast [sic]". The Golliwog character used to be on Alan Whitehead's bass drum. Unusually, they now had two bass players, Knight on four-string and Fairley on six-string (Fairley having dropped the standard rhythm guitar normally associated with rock groups of the early 1960s).

With their EMI Columbia contract at an end, Walsh, with the help of John Salter, Walsh's booking agent, was successful in signing the band to CBS Records with producer Mike Smith, who was having great success with the Tremeloes, now their agency stablemates. But their first few CBS singles also failed to chart in the UK.

Drummer Ray Duffy (who later played with Matthews Southern Comfort and Gallagher and Lyle and also on Campbell's later solo recordings), decided to leave in 1966 to return to Scotland to get married just after their first CBS release, "Its All Leading up to Saturday Night". The band then placed adverts in the New Musical Express and Melody Maker, and after various auditions, former postman Alan Whitehead (ex member of London outfit the Loose Ends) became their new drummer, debuting on their next single, "Can't Stop Now", which failed to sell despite the group's performing it on a TV play, The Fantasist, written by Alun Owen, for the BBC Two Theatre 625 series.

Their third CBS single, the self penned "I See the Rain", written by Campbell and Ford, was praised by Jimi Hendrix as the "best cut of 1967". It became a chart-topper in the Netherlands the same year. Graham Nash of the Hollies contributed to the session, but it too flopped in the UK, although the track, with its distinct 1960s feel, has since attained a cult following and been resurrected by artists such as Susanna Hoffs of the Bangles and Matthew Sweet (see Under the Covers, Vol. 1).

19 January 1967 proved to be a turning point in the band's progress when they made their debut at London's Marquee Club where they supported Pink Floyd. Two weeks later, on 3 February, they supported the Action. After that, they never supported anyone again at the Marquee and on 16 March 1967 they began a long residency which carried through to the autumn of the following year, building a reputation and following, including touring with the Who, Joe Cocker, Traffic, Gene Pitney and the Tremeloes. This culminated with summer appearances at the Windsor Jazz and Rock Festival, directly preceding Jerry Lee Lewis, and Festival of the Flower Children Woburn Abbey.

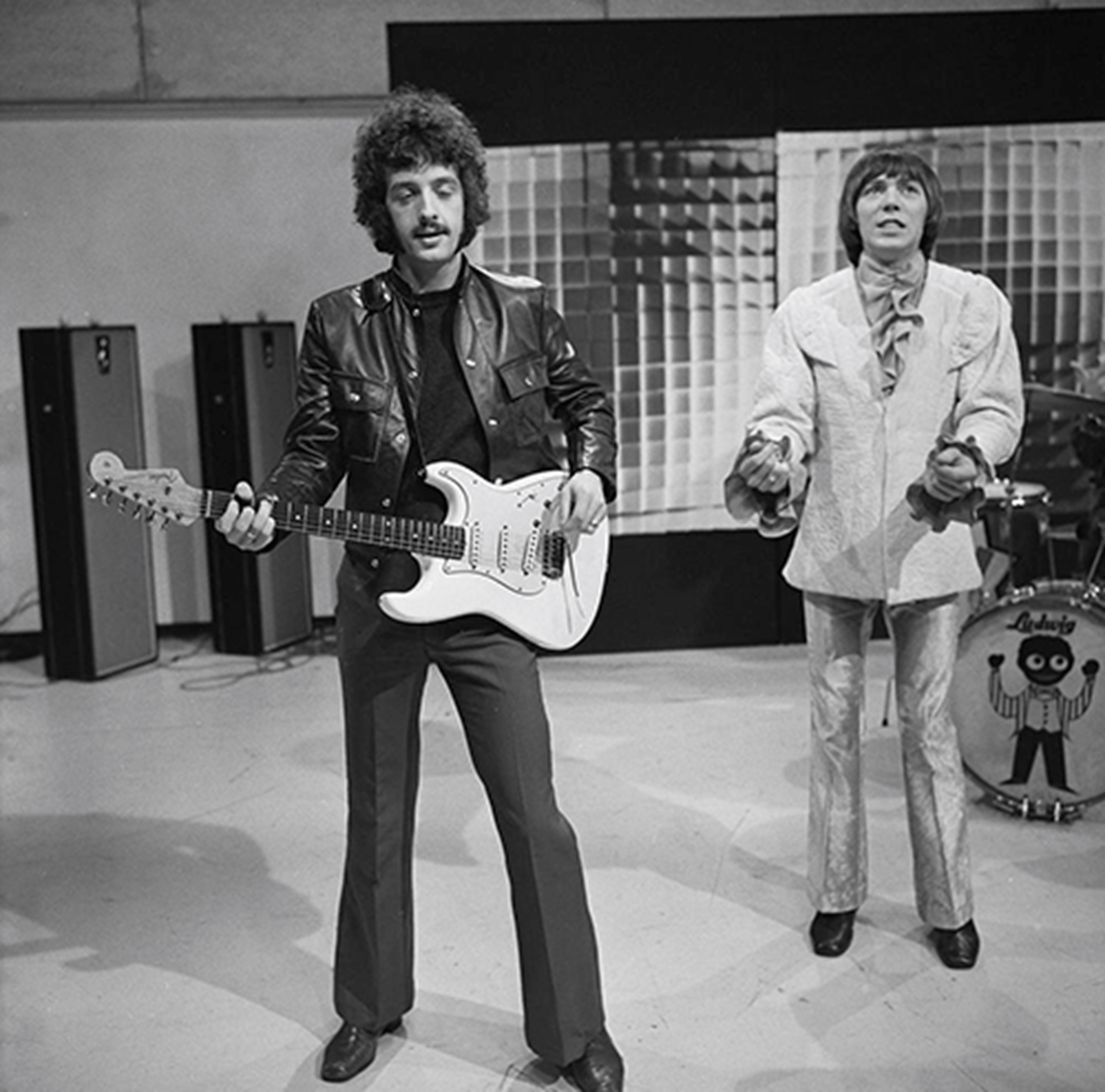
Junior Campbell and Dean Ford, Marmalade, Dutch TV (1968)

CBS, concerned at Marmalade's lack of commercial success, threatened to drop them if they did not have a hit. So after the failure of another self-penned single later that year, "Man in a Shop", they were urged to record more chart-orientated material. Mike Smith offered the band "Everlasting Love", but they declined as they preferred to continue to record group based material rather than with large orchestral accompaniment. The song was then given to Love Affair, arranged by Keith Mansfield, which became a No. 1 for them. They later gave in to pressure and recorded "Lovin' Things" written by Artie Schroeck and Jet Loring in 1967, and arranged by Mansfield using a similar orchestral formula (Mansfield already knew the band and had previously arranged earlier cuts including their previous single "Man in a Shop") It reached No. 6 in the UK Singles Chart in the summer of 1968. This was covered by the Grass Roots in the US in 1969, using virtually the same arrangement. Marmalade's debut album, There's a Lot of It About, featured a mix of some of their singles and cover versions of current popular tunes, and was released in 1968.

Marmalade made a cameo appearance on the big screen in the film Subterfuge that year.

After a lesser hit with their follow-up single "Wait for Me Mary-Anne" (written by Alan Blaikley and Ken Howard), which made No. 30, they enjoyed their biggest UK success with their cover of the Beatles' "Ob-La-Di, Ob-La-Da", which topped the UK chart in January 1969, the group becoming the first Scottish group to top that chart. Their version of "Ob-La-Di, Ob-La-Da" sold around half a million in the UK, and a million copies globally by April 1969. This was followed by further success with "Baby Make It Soon" (written by Tony Macaulay), which reached No. 9 in the summer of 1969.

In February 1969, the band appeared on the BBC's flagship program Colour Me Pop, (precursor to The Old Grey Whistle Test) performing a halfhour slot. They also appeared on the BBC's review of the 1960s music scene, Pop Go The Sixties, performing "Ob-La-Di, Ob-La-Da" live on the broadcast on BBC 1 on New Year's Eve 1969.

=== Decca era ===
In November 1969, the band was signed to Decca Records by Decca head of A&R, Dick Rowe under a lucrative advance deal, allowing the band to write and produce their own songs, with no studio time restraints, and in their first Decca recording session, they recorded "Reflections of My Life", which would become their biggest worldwide hit, rewarding Decca's and Dick Rowe's faith in the band. Topping the charts in Europe (also Top 10 in United States and No. 1 in most of South America), it was written by Campbell and Ford, and featured a "backwards" (backmasking) guitar solo by Campbell. "Reflections of My Life" has recorded over two million sales, and the writers were awarded a Special Citation of Achievement in 1998 by BMI in attaining radio broadcast performances in excess of one million in the US alone.

Other UK hits for Decca included "Rainbow" (UK No. 3 and US No. 51) and "My Little One" (UK No. 15)., "Cousin Norman" and "Radancer" (both reaching UK No. 6).

Their manager, Peter Walsh, was a 1960s and 1970s pop entrepreneur whose portfolio also included the Tremeloes, Bay City Rollers, the Move, Billy Ocean, the Troggs and Blue Mink.

Their first Decca album, Reflections Of The Marmalade was released in the US as Reflections Of My Life on Decca's London Records subsidiary. Their US singles during this era likewise came out on London. But their manager, Walsh, turned down an offer to tour the US opening for Three Dog Night, thus blowing an opportunity for further exposure there. To be fair to Walsh, he did not much care for the fact that Marmalade would have had to pay a substantial dollar premium to do so, a practice common in the US but totally alien to Walsh's traditional UK management and agency style.

After Campbell, who co-wrote most of the group's original material with Ford, left the band in March 1971 for a solo career, and to study orchestration and composition at the Royal College of Music, they began a series of line-up changes, including the loss of drummer Whitehead.

Marmalade recruited guitarist Hugh Nicholson, an ex-member of the Poets, to replace Campbell, and after the first post Campbell release, "Cousin Norman", it was Dean Ford who insisted on sacking Whitehead and recruiting from the Poets, Dougie Henderson. This caused Marmalade to suffer adverse publicity from the UK's News of the World after an embittered Whitehead gave them stories of the band's experiences with groupies.

Marmalade released Songs in November 1971, with Nicholson taking over most song compositions, which met with limited success. However, Nicholson penned two of their last hits, "Cousin Norman" (brass arranged by Campbell) and "Radancer", as well as the lesser hit "Back on the Road", on which he sang lead vocal.

Fairley quit the band circa 1972 to run the group's music publishing company, then Nicholson, who was discouraged over the failure of their Songs album, also left in 1973 to form Blue (not to be confused with a later boy band of the same name). Ford, Knight and Henderson carried on with Marmalade. Nicholson was eventually replaced by Mike Japp, a rock guitarist from the Welsh band, Thank You.

The group returned to EMI and released a new single, "Wishing Well", credited simply as Marmalade (dropping the "The"). But Knight left during the recording of their next album, Our House Is Rocking (which showcased a heavier rock sound and was delayed until the autumn of 1974) and the group was briefly a trio before Joe Breen (ex-Dream Police) came in on bass. Refusing to play most of the band's old hit records on stage, the group slowly came to a standstill.

=== 1975–1978 ===
In 1975, Knight linked up with former drummer Alan Whitehead to form 'Vintage Marmalade' with Sandy Newman (vocals, guitar, keyboards) and Charlie Smith (guitar). They were reunited with their old manager, Peter Walsh, to play all the hits on stage and had a full date sheet.

Later in 1975, after Ford and the remaining members called it quits, Knight and Whitehead took over the name Marmalade with the new line-up, fronted by Newman. They signed a deal with Tony Macaulay's Target Records and in 1976, had what turned out to be their final Top 10 hit with the ominously entitled, Macaulay penned song, "Falling Apart at the Seams". The song also reached the easy listening charts in the U.S. and made the Top 50 of the Billboard Hot 100, becoming the group's last charting single on the U.S. charts. Subsequent singles failed to chart. One of these was "Talking In Your Sleep", produced by Roger Greenaway and released in January 1978, six months ahead of the Crystal Gayle version of the same song, which became well known worldwide.

Newman (ex-Chris McClure Section, 1968–1970) has continued to front Marmalade since 1975, releasing a further eleven singles in the UK (excluding re-releases), seven of which were via Target Records, none of which have charted in the UK or US, and today they continue to tour the nostalgia circuit performing the band's full hit repertoire.

Smith departed in 1977 to join Nicholson in Blue and Garth Watt-Roy came in briefly for Marmalade's Only Light On My Horizon Now album, before leaving for the Q-Tips in 1978. He was replaced by guitarist Ian Withington, who appeared alongside Knight, Newman and new drummer Stu Williamson for the next album Doing It All For You (1979).

Whitehead left the band in 1978 to manage other pop groups and singers, which he has continued to do. He also appeared in the 2010 TV series Take Me Out and ran a lap dance club.

=== Subsequent years ===
Charlie Smith returned in 1980, as the band's drummer this time. Alan Holmes (vocals, guitars, keyboards), a former member of the Bristol-based band Federation, succeeded Withington. A 1980 US only album, Marmalade, on G&P Records, featured a re-recorded mix of their Decca, EMI and Target material, alongside some Junior Campbell-penned tracks. Another unsuccessful album, Heartbreaker, came out in the UK in 1982 on the Spectra label.

Graham Knight remained as the sole original band member touring the nostalgia circuit with Newman, Smith and Alan Holmes. In 1982, Glenn Taylor replaced Smith on drums, though Smith returned from 1989 to around 1998, before Taylor took over permanently.

Dave Dee began appearing as guest singer for Marmalade in 1987 and recorded a single with the band, "Scirocco", in 1989. He continued to make live guest appearances with them until his death in 2009.

In September 2010 Graham Knight, the last remaining member of the original band, departed. Drummer Taylor also left to join the Fortunes. The new players were drummer Damon Sawyer and bassist Mike Steed. In 2011, guitarist and vocalist John James Newman joined, making the band a quintet once again.

2013 saw the current Marmalade line-up release their first new studio album since 1979. Entitled Penultimate and released in CD and vinyl formats, it featured six new compositions, together with re-recordings of many Marmalade songs. The album was launched on 4 October 2013 to coincide with the start of a 52-date UK tour.

In 2015, Jan Robinson (vocals, bass) and Chris North (drums, percussion) were brought in as the new rhythm section, in place of Steed and Sawyer.

=== Original band members — evolved history ===
2011 saw the release of Fine Cuts–The Best Of Marmalade on the Union Square Music BMG Salvo label (SALVOMDCD26), a double album containing all of the Marmalade original studio recordings between 1966 and 1972, including all of their chart hits. The complete catalogue was also made available via digital download.

Ford was one of many lead vocalists contributing to the Alan Parsons Project. Although for some years he withdrew from the music industry and battled alcoholism, settling in Los Angeles, he became active in music again and released a single of his own composition "Glasgow Road" with Joe Tansin (ex-Badfinger) in 2012. He later recorded a version of "Reflections Of My Life" in 2015 and in 2016 released a PledgeMusic album entitled Feel My Heartbeat, available for digital download. Ford died on 31 December 2018 at the age of 73 at his home in Los Angeles of complications from Parkinson's disease. His final album, a two-disc collection called This Scottish Heart, was released just weeks before his death.

Fairley also moved to Los Angeles in the late 1970s having worked in music publishing for the RSO Group Robert Stigwood and for the band Yes. He retired from the music business many years ago and set up a bar and music venue called The Scotland Yard Pub, in Los Angeles in the early 1980s: he sold the business in March 2018 and retired. He died at his home in Los Angeles on 11 August 2020, at the age of 76.

Whitehead continues in artist management and can be seen reviewing the Onyx range of tuned sports cars on the Together TV programme "Rock 'N' Roll Cars" (he also provides the voice-over for this show, which features pop acts such as Go West and Tony Hadley talking about their motoring history).

Knight retired from Marmalade in September 2010.

Campbell became a solo recording artist, songwriter, television and film composer, record producer and music arranger, and lives in Sussex. He continues to oversee all of the master rights to the original band recordings on behalf of the whole band, which they retain, and also their publishing rights.

== Members ==
=== Current members ===
- Sandy Newman – lead vocals, lead guitar, keyboards (1975–present)
- Alan Holmes – vocals, acoustic/electric guitar, keyboards (1980–present)
- John James Newman – vocals, acoustic guitar (2011–present)
- Jan S. Robinson – vocals, bass (2015–present)
- Chris North – drums, percussion (2015–present)

=== Classic lineup ===
- Dean Ford – lead vocals, guitar, harmonica (1966–1975; died 2018)
- William "Junior" Campbell – vocals, guitars, keyboards (1966–1971)
- Patrick Fairley – vocals, six string bass/rhythm guitars (1966–1972; died 2020)
- Graham Knight – vocals, bass (1966–1973, 1975–2010)
- Alan Whitehead – drums (1966–1971, 1975–1978)

=== Further members ===
- Dougie Henderson – drums (1971–1975)
- Hugh Nicholson – vocals, guitars (1971–1973)
- Joe Breen – vocals, bass (1973–1975)
- Mike Japp – vocals, guitars (1973–1975; died 2012)
- Charlie Smith – vocals, guitar (1975–1977; drums 1980–1982 and 1989–1998)
- Garth Watt-Roy – vocals, keyboards (1977–1978)
- Ian Withington – vocals, guitar (1978–1980)
- Stu Williamson – drums (1978–1980)
- Glenn Taylor – drums (1982–1989; 1998–2010)
- Damon Sawyer – drums (2010–2015)
- Mike Steed – vocals, bass (2010–2015)

=== Gaylords members ===
- Patrick Fairley (1961–1966)
- William Junior Campbell (1961–1966)
- Bill Irving – bass (1961–1964)
- Tommy Frew – drums (1961–1963)
- Tommy Scott – vocals (1961–1963)
- Billy Johnston – bass (1961)
- Wattie Rodgers (Dunlop) – vocals (1961)
- Pat McGovern – lead guitars (1961)
- Billy Reid – vocals (1961)
- Dean Ford (1963–1966)
- Raymond Duffy (1963–1966)
- Davey Hunter – organ (1963)
- Graham Knight (1965–1966)

=== Unofficial members ===
- Dave Dee – vocals (occasional guest appearances, 1987–2009; died 2009)

== Discography ==
Studio albums

- There's a Lot of It About (1968)
- Reflections of the Marmalade (1970)
- Songs (1971)
- Our House Is Rocking (1974)
- The Only Light on My Horizon Now (1977)
- Doing It All for You (1978)
- Heavens Above (1979)
- Marmalade (1980)
- Heartbreaker (1982)
- Penultimate (2013)

== See also ==
- List of bands from Glasgow
- List of Scottish musicians

== Sources ==
- Info sourced from liner notes, including those by band members on:
- 1992 Decca Records (Deram) 820 562-2 Reflections of The Marmalade
- 1996 Castle CD CCSCD436; The Marmalade – The Definitive Collection
- 1998 Castle CD CCSCD825 Marmalade – The Definitive Collection
- 2000 Castle – Sequel NEECD 335 Rainbow: The Decca Years
- 2004 Sanctuary CMOCD 940 The Marmalade – BBC Sessions
- 2005 Sanctuary SMETD 182 Marmalade – The Ultimate Collection
- 2011 Union Square Music – Salvo SALVOMDCD26 Fine Cuts: The Best Of Marmalade
