= Sandie Shaw discography =

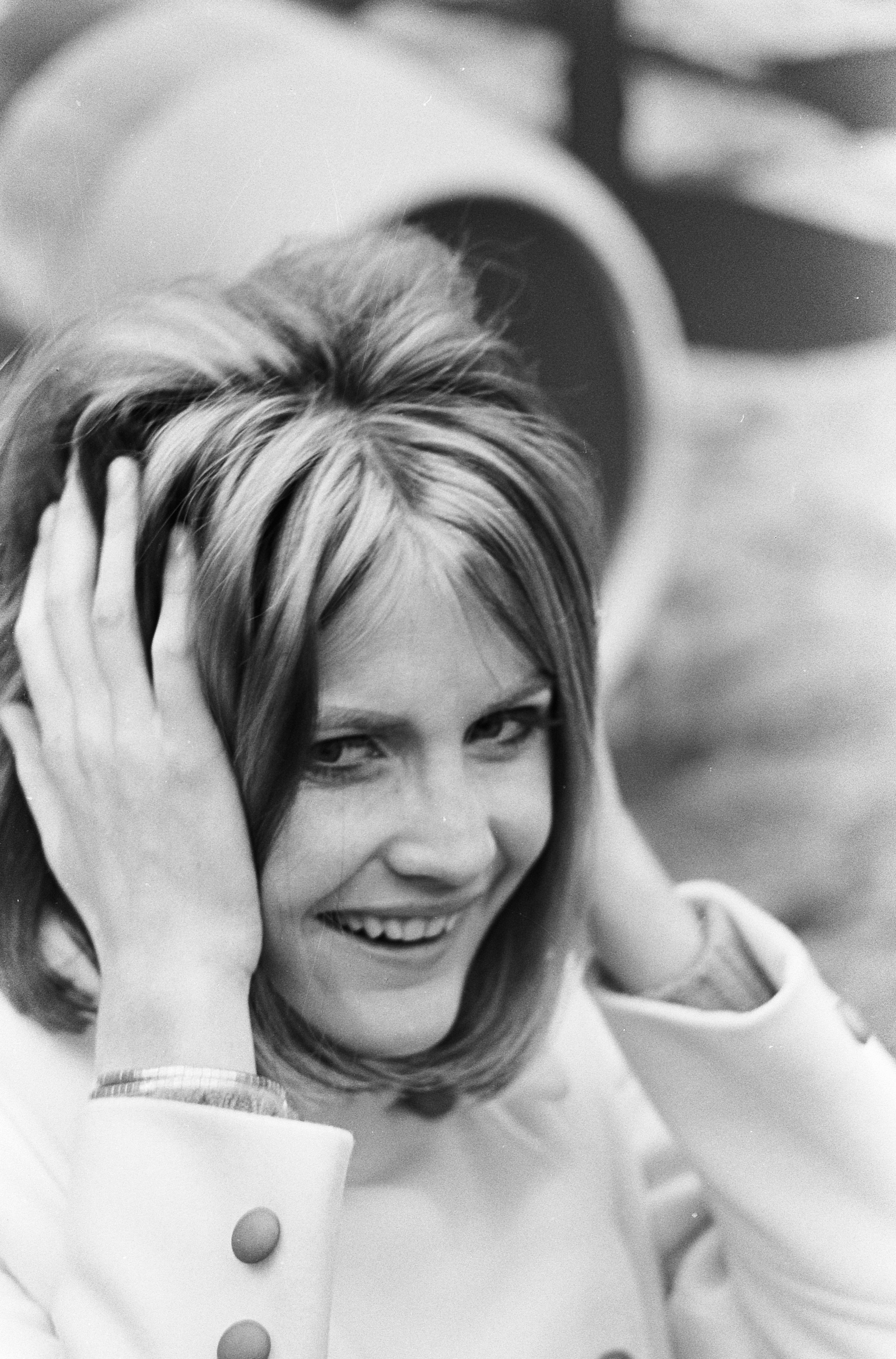
Shaw in 1967

This is the discography for the British pop singer Sandie Shaw.

== Albums ==
=== English-language studio albums ===
Title	Album details	Peak chart positions	
Title	Album details	UK	US
Sandie	Released: February 1965; Label: Pye	3	100
Me	Released: November 1965; Label: Pye	—	—
Love Me, Please Love Me	Released: November 1967; Label: Pye	—	—
The Sandie Shaw Supplement	Released: November 1968; Label: Pye	—	—
Reviewing the Situation	Released: December 1969; Label: Pye	—	—
Choose Life	Released: 1983; Label: Palace	—	—
Hello Angel	Released: 24 October 1988; Label: Rough Trade	—	—
"—" denotes releases that did not chart or were not released in that territory.

=== Foreign-language studio albums ===
Title	Album details
Sandie Shaw chante en français	Released: 1965; Label: Vogue; Sung in French
Sandie Shaw	Released: 1967; Label: Pye; Sung in Italian
En español	Released: 1967; Label: Pye; Sung in Spanish

=== Compilation albums ===
Title	Album details	Peak chart positions	
Title	Album details	UK	GER
The Golden Hits of Sandie Shaw	Released: April 1966; Label: Pye	—	—
Puppet on a String	Released: May 1967; Label: Pye	—	12
Golden Hour Presents Sandie Shaw's Greatest Hits	Released: 1972; Label: Golden Hour	—	—
The Sandie Shaw File	Released: November 1977; Label: Pye	—	—
20 Golden Pieces of Sandie Shaw	Released: April 1986; Label: Bulldog	—	—
The Collection	Released: February 1990; Label: Castle Communications	—	—
The 64/67 Complete Sandie Shaw Set	Released: June 1993; Label: Sequel	—	—
The Best of Sandie Shaw: Nothing Less Than Brilliant	Released: November 1994; Label: Virgin	64	—
Pourvu que ça dure – Chante en français	Released: 20 October 2003; Label: EMI	—	—
La cantante scalza – Canta in italiano	Released: 20 October 2003; Label: EMI	—	—
Wiedehopf im Mai – Sandie Shaw singt auf Deutsch	Released: 8 March 2004; Label: EMI	—	—
Marionetas en la cuerda – Sandie Shaw Canta en español	Released: 8 March 2004; Label: EMI	—	—
Nothing Comes Easy	Released: 8 November 2004; Label: EMI; 4-CD box set	60	—
The Very Best of Sandie Shaw	Released: 28 February 2005; Label: EMI	—	—
The Collection	Released: 26 March 2007; Label: EMI	—	—
Long Live Love...The Very Best Of	Released: 6 May 2013; Label: Union Square Music	—	—
"—" denotes releases that did not chart or were not released in that territory.

== EPs ==
Title	Details	Peak chart positions
Title	Details	UK
(There's) Always Something There to Remind Me	Released: 15 January 1965; Label: Pye	9
Long Live Love	Released: 13 August 1965; Label: Pye	—
Talk About Love	Released: December 1965; Label: Pye	—
Message Understood	Released: January 1966; Label: Pye	—
Tomorrow	Released: April 1966; Label: Pye	—
Nothing Comes Easy	Released: July 1966; Label: Pye	—
Run with Sandie Shaw	Released: November 1966; Label: Pye	—
Sandie Shaw in French	Released: March 1967; Label: Pye	—
Sandie Shaw in Italian	Released: March 1967; Label: Pye	—
Tell the Boys	Released: May 1967; Label: Pye	4
Puppet on a String	Released: July 1980; Label: Flash Backs	—
"—" denotes releases that did not chart.

== Singles ==
=== English-language singles ===
Titles (A-side, B-side)	Year	Peak chart positions							
Titles (A-side, B-side)	Year	UK	AUS	CAN	IRE	NL	NOR	NZ	US
"As Long as You're Happy, Baby" b/w "Ya-Ya-Da-Da"	1964	—	—	—	—	—	—	—	—
"(There's) Always Something There to Remind Me" b/w "Don't You Know"	1964	1	16	1	7	10	—	—	52
"I'd Be Far Better Off Without You" b/w "Girl Don't Come"	1964	— 3	— 48	— 2	—	—	—	—	— 42
"I'll Stop at Nothing" b/w "You Can't Blame Him"	1965	4	—	—	—	—	—	—	123
"Long Live Love" b/w "I've Heard About Him"	1965	1	12	6	—	9	8	2	97
"Message Understood" b/w "Don't You Count on It"	1965	6	66	21	—	18	—	—	—
"How Can You Tell" b/w "If Ever You Need Me"	1965	21	—	—	—	—	—	15	131
"I Don't Need That Kind of Lovin'" (Note: "I Don't Need That Kind of Lovin'" was only released as a single in Germany.) b/w "Oh No He Don't"	1966	—	—	—	—	—	—	—	—
"Tomorrow" b/w "Hurting You"	1966	9	24	—	—	—	—	—	—
"Nothing Comes Easy" b/w "Stop Before You Start"	1966	14	74	—	—	—	—	—	—
"Run" b/w "Long Walk Home"	1966	32	91	—	—	—	—	—	—
"Think Sometimes About Me" b/w "Hide All Emotion"	1966	32	—	—	—	—	—	—	—
"I Don't Need Anything" b/w "Keep in Touch"	1967	50	—	—	—	—	—	—	—
"Puppet on a String" b/w "Tell the Boys"	1967	1	2	13	—	1	1	1	—
"Tonight in Tokyo" b/w "You've Been Seeing Her Again"	1967	21	—	—	—	—	—	—	—
"You've Not Changed" b/w "Don't Make Me Cry"	1967	18	6	—	—	—	—	—	—
"Everybody Loves a Lover" (Note: "Everybody Loves a Lover" was only released as a single in Germany.) b/w "I Don't Need That Kind of Lovin'"	1967	—	—	—	—	—	—	—	—
"Today" b/w "London"	1968	27	17	—	—	—	—	—	—
"Don't Run Away" b/w "Stop"	1968	—	—	—	—	—	—	—	—
"Show Me" b/w "One More Lie"	1968	—	92	—	—	—	—	—	—
"Together" b/w "Turn on the Sunshine"	1968	54	—	—	—	—	—	—	—
"Those Were the Days" b/w "Make It Go"	1968	51	35	—	—	—	—	—	—
"Monsieur Dupont" b/w "Voice in the Crowd"	1969	6	18	—	—	—	5	2	—
"Think It All Over" b/w "Send Me a Letter"	1969	42	79	—	—	24	—	—	—
"Heaven Knows I'm Missing Him Now" b/w "So Many Things to Do"	1969	—	—	—	—	—	—	—	—
"By Tomorrow" b/w "Maple Village"	1970	—	—	—	—	—	—	—	—
"Wight Is Wight" b/w "That's the Way He's Made"	1970	—	—	—	—	—	—	8	—
"Rose Garden" b/w "Gonna Type a Letter"	1971	41	—	—	—	—	—	—	—
"Show Your Face" b/w "Dear Madame"	1971	—	—	—	—	—	—	—	—
"Where Did They Go" b/w "Look at Me"	1972	—	—	—	—	—	—	—	—
"Father and Son" b/w "Pity and Ship"	1972	—	—	—	—	—	—	—	—
"Hello Bambino" (Note: "Hello Bambino" was only released as a single in Germany.) b/w "Sommerwind"	1972	—	—	—	—	—	—	—	—
"One More Night" b/w "Still So Young"	1977	—	—	—	—	—	—	—	—
"Just a Disallusion" b/w "Your Mama Wouldn't Like It"	1977	—	—	—	—	—	—	—	—
"Anyone Who Had a Heart" b/w "Anyone Who Had a Heart" (instrumental)	1982	—	71	—	—	—	—	—	—
"Wish I Was" b/w "Life Is Like a Star"	1983	195	—	—	—	—	—	—	—
"Dragon King's Daughter" (Note: "Dragon King's Daughter" was only released as a single in the Netherlands.) b/w "Life Is Like a Star"	1983	—	—	—	—	—	—	—	—
"Hand in Glove" b/w "I Don't Owe You Anything"	1984	27	—	—	—	—	—	—	—
"Are You Ready to Be Heartbroken?" b/w "Steven (You Don't Eat Meat)"	1986	68	—	—	—	—	—	—	—
"Frederick" b/w "Go Johnny Go"	1986	93	—	—	—	—	—	—	—
"Please Help the Cause Against Loneliness" b/w "I Will Remain"	1988	86	—	—	—	—	—	—	—
"Nothing Less Than Brilliant" b/w "I Love Peace"	1988	160	—	—	—	—	—	—	—
"Cool About You" (Note: "Cool About You" was only released as a single in Australia.) b/w "Flesh and Blood"	1990	—	—	—	—	—	—	—	—
"Nothing Less Than Brilliant" (reissue) b/w "(There's) Always Something There to Remind Me"	1994	66	—	—	—	—	—	—	—
"—" denotes releases that did not chart or were not released in that territory.

=== French-language singles/EPs ===
Titles (A-side, B-side)	Year	Peak chart positions
Titles (A-side, B-side)	Year	FRA
"Mais tu l'aimes" ("Girl Don't Come") b/w "Il a de la peine" ("As Long as You're Happy, Baby")	1965	—
"Pourvu que ça dure" ("Long Live Love") b/w "Parler d'amour" ("Talk About Love")	1965	9
"Tu l'as bien compris" ("Message Understood") b/w "Pourquoi ne veux-tu pas de moi" ("Too Bad You Don't Want Me")	1965	—
"Ne compte pas sur moi" ("Don't You Count on It") b/w "La vallée des larmes" ("Dismal Ways")	1965	—
"C'est toi qui le dit" ("Oh No He Don't") (with Chris Andrews) b/w "J'ai raison" ("How Can You Tell")	1966	—
"Demain" ("Tomorrow") b/w "Tu rêves un peu" ("I Don't Need That Kind of Lovin'")	1966	—
"Ça glisse" ("Hurting You") b/w "Stop je peux t'aimer" ("Stop Before You Start")	1966	—
"Je ne marche pas" ("Keep in Touch") b/w "Rien n'est fini"	1966	—
"Un tout petit pantin" ("Puppet on a String") b/w "Prends la vie du bon côté" ("Tell the Boys")	1967	3
"Une Anglaise aime un Français" ("You've Not Changed") b/w "Fais moi pleurer" ("Don't Make Me Cry")	1967	—
"Aujourd'hui" ("Today) b/w "Ces yeux de velours" ("Gypsy Eyes")	1968	—
"Le temps des fleurs" ("Those Were the Days") b/w "Prouve-moi" ("Show Me")	1968	—
"Monsieur Dupont" b/w "Écoute ma voix"	1969	—
"Dieu seul sait" ("Heaven Knows I'm Missing Him Now") b/w "Le grand aventurier" ("Everyday")	1969	—
"La fatalità" ("Che effetto mi fa") b/w "Le fou sur la colline" ("The Fool on the Hill")	1970	—
"—" denotes releases that did not chart.

=== German-language singles ===
Titles (A-side, B-side)	Year	Peak chart positions	
Titles (A-side, B-side)	Year	AUT	GER
"Einmal glücklich sein wie die Andern" ("(There's) Always Something There to Remind Me") b/w "Ohne dich" ("Don't You Know")	1965	—	—
"Du weißt nichts von deinem Glück" ("Long Live Love") b/w "Das ist unmöglich" ("You Can't Blame Him")	1965	5	25
"Und so was nennt man nun Liebe" ("I Don't Need That Kind of Lovin'") b/w "Mir ist alles klar" ("Message Understood")	1966	—	—
"Wir sehen uns ja wieder" b/w "Ich denke an morgen" ("Tomorrow")	1966	—	39
"Wiedehopf im Mai" ("Puppet on a String") b/w "Was kann ich dafür" ("Had a Dream Last Night")	1967	—	36
"Du bist wunderbar" ("You've Not Changed") b/w "Dein anderes Gesicht" ("You've Been Seeing Her Again")	1967	—	28
"Heute" ("Today") b/w "London"	1968	—	—
"An jenem Tag" ("Those Were the Days") b/w "Du lügst so wunderbar" ("One More Lie")	1968	—	—
"Ich sage stop!" ("Think It All Over") b/w "Du hast nie mal Zeit für mich" ("Anytime, Anyplace, Anywhere")	1969	—	—
"Alles was ich will, ist deine Liebe" ("Heaven Knows I'm Missing Him Now") b/w "Die ganz kleinen Dinge nur" ("So Many Things to Do")	1969	—	—
"Du kommst morgen" ("By Tomorrow") b/w "Dadurch erst wird alles schön" ("Maple Village")	1970	—	—
"Hello Bambino" b/w "Sommerwind"	1972	—	—
"—" denotes releases that did not chart.

=== Italian-language singles ===
Titles (A-side, B-side)	Year	Peak chart positions
Titles (A-side, B-side)	Year	IT
"E ti avrò" ("Girl Don't Come") b/w "Viva l'amore con te" ("Long Live Love")	1965	—
"Domani" ("Tomorrow") b/w "Quello che tu cerchi amica" ("Stop Feeling Sorry for Yourself")	1966	15
"Ho sognato te" ("Had a Dream Last Night") b/w "La danza delle note" ("Puppet on a String")	1967	— 8
"Oggi" ("Today") b/w "Londra" ("London")	1968	—
"Lo vuole lui, lo vuole lei" b/w "Stop li dove stai" ("Stop Before You Start")	1968	—
"Quelli erano giorni" ("Those Were the Days") b/w "Com'è bella la sera"	1968	18
"Papà Dupont" ("Monsieur Dupont") b/w "Ma guarda un pò chi c'è" ("Voice in the Crowd")	1969	—
"Un battito d'ali" b/w "Dammi tempo"	1970	—
"Che effetto mi fa" b/w "Usignolo usignolo" ("Maple Village")	1970	—
"—" denotes releases that did not chart.

=== Spanish-language singles/EPs ===
Titles (A-side, B-side)	Year	Peak chart positions
Titles (A-side, B-side)	Year	SPA
"¡Viva el amor!" ("Long Live Love") b/w "No puedes culparle" ("You Can't Blame Him")	1965	—
"Mañana" ("Tomorrow") b/w "No lo comprendi" ("Message Understood")	1966	13
"Lo consegui" ("Nothing Comes Easy") b/w "No necesito tu amor" ("I Don't Need That Kind of Lovin'")	1967	—
"Marionetas en la cuerda" ("Puppet on a String") b/w "A los chicos les dirás" ("Tell the Boys")	1967	1
"No has cambiado nada" ("You've Not Changed") b/w "Gitanos ojos" ("Gipsy Eyes")	1967	—
"Parale" ("Hold Him Down") b/w "Esta noche en Tokyo" ("Tonight in Tokyo")	1967	—
"Qué tiempo tan feliz" ("Hurting You") b/w "Londres" ("London")	1968	30
"Monsieur Dupont" b/w "Déjate ya" (Think It All Over)	1969	23
"Qué efecto me hará" ("Che effetto mi fa") b/w "Un mañana" ("By Tomorrow")	1970	—
"—" denotes releases that did not chart.
