= Nothing Less Than Brilliant =

Compilation album by Sandie Shaw
- Released: 1994
- Genre: Pop
- Label: Virgin

Sandie Shaw chronology
Hello Angel (1988)	Nothing Less Than Brilliant (1994)	Pourvu Que Ça Dure - Chante En Français (2003)

Nothing Less Than Brilliant is a compilation album by the British singer Sandie Shaw. Released in 1994 by Virgin Records, it contains several new recordings of her hit singles from the 1960s as well as some in their original forms. It also featured some songs recorded in the 1980s.

The album spent one week in November 1994 in the UK Albums Chart at number 64.

== Track listing ==
1. "Always Something There To Remind Me"
2. "Long Live Love"
3. "Girl Don't Come"
4. "Message Understood"
5. "Nothing Less Than Brilliant"
6. "Hand in Glove"
7. "Are You Ready To Be Heartbroken"
8. "A Girl Called Johnny"
9. "I'll Stop At Nothing"
10. "Heaven Knows I'm Missing Him Now"
11. "You've Not Changed"
12. "Monsieur Dupont"
13. "I Don't Owe You Anything"
14. "Anyone Who Had a Heart"
15. "Comrade in Arms"
16. "Hello Angel"
17. "Strange Bedfellows"
18. "Words"
19. "Ev'rytime We Say Goodbye"
20. "Your Time Is Gonna Come"
21. "Frederick"
22. "Please Help The Cause Against Loneliness"
23. "Tomorrow"
24. "Nothing Comes Easy"
25. "Puppet on a String"
