= Wizo =

German punk rock band

WIZO
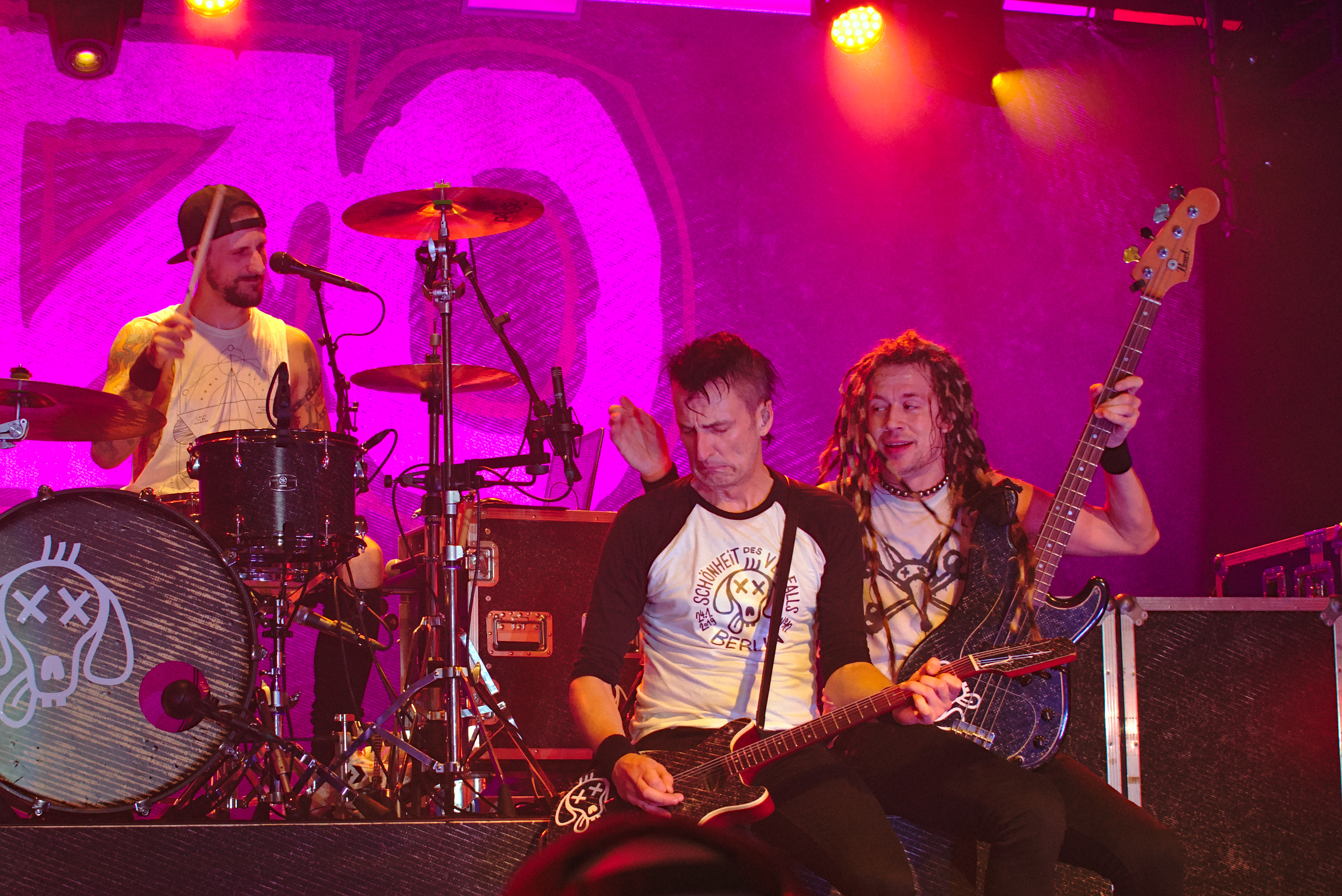
- WIZO in Berlin, 2019

Background information
- Origin: Sindelfingen, Germany
- Genres: Punk rock, hardcore punk, anarchopunk
- Years active: 1985–2005; 2009–present
- Labels: Hulk Räckorz, Fat Wreck Chords
- Members: Axel Kurth; Ralf Dietel; Alex Stinson
- Past members: Jochen Bix (1985–1990); Jörn Genserowski (1985–2005); Ralf "Ratz" Plapp (1987–1990); Karlheinz "Charly" Zaske (1990–1996); Ingo Hahn (1996–2000); Thomas Guhl (1998–2015); Thorsten Schwämmle (2009–2013)
- Website: wizo.de

WIZO (German pronunciation: [ˈviːzo]) is a German punk rock band from Sindelfingen, that formed in 1985. WIZO's music is characterized by a combination of humorous and political lyrics with a fast, melodic punk rock sound. They are considered to be part of the German movement known as Fun-Punk (also punk pathetique or 'pret-punk'). Their lyrics are written in German, and Axel Kurth has spoken about how German lyrics are important so that the music and lyrics go together. They have named three bands as important influences: Normahl, Hass, and The Exploited. Axel Kurth has spoken out about how difficult it is for musicians to make a living with streaming services.

The band espouses left-wing politics and describes themselves as "against Nazis, racists, sexists, and other assholes!" They have also said that the most important themes for them are equality for women, queer people, and other marginalized groups. Axel Kurth has stated "We are all Antifa. Everyone, who does not like it when people are treated differently on the basis of some obscure characteristics, is in my opinion an anti-fascist."

== History ==
=== 1986–2005 ===
Jörn Genserowski (bass), Axel Kurth (guitar), and Jochen Bix (vocals) founded the band "Wieso" (English translation: "why?") in Sindelfingen, a town in the vicinity of Stuttgart, in 1986. Until Ralf "Ratz" Plapp joined the band as a drummer, the group practiced with a drumcomputer. Later in 1986, they altered their band name to "WIZO".

In 1987 the band made their first public appearances in Sindelfingen and the surrounding area. In 1988, WIZO recorded their first demo tape Keiner ist kleiner in the Nebringer Hammer-Sound-Studio. This was followed by a second demo tape in 1990. Jochen Bix sang a few songs, including the Judas Priest cover, "Breaking the Law". Ralf "Ratz" Plapp was replaced by Charly Zasko on drums. Jochen Bix left the band to move to Berlin-Friedrichshain. Axel Kurth took over as singer. Axel Kurth is also the main songwriter for the band, and he has jokingly said that he writes many of his songs on the toilet.

Later that year, together with Andreas "Fratz" Thum, WIZO founded their own label, Hulk Räckorz and released the EP Klebstoff ("Glue"), their first vinyl record, which was recorded in 1989 in a basement studio in Stuttgart.

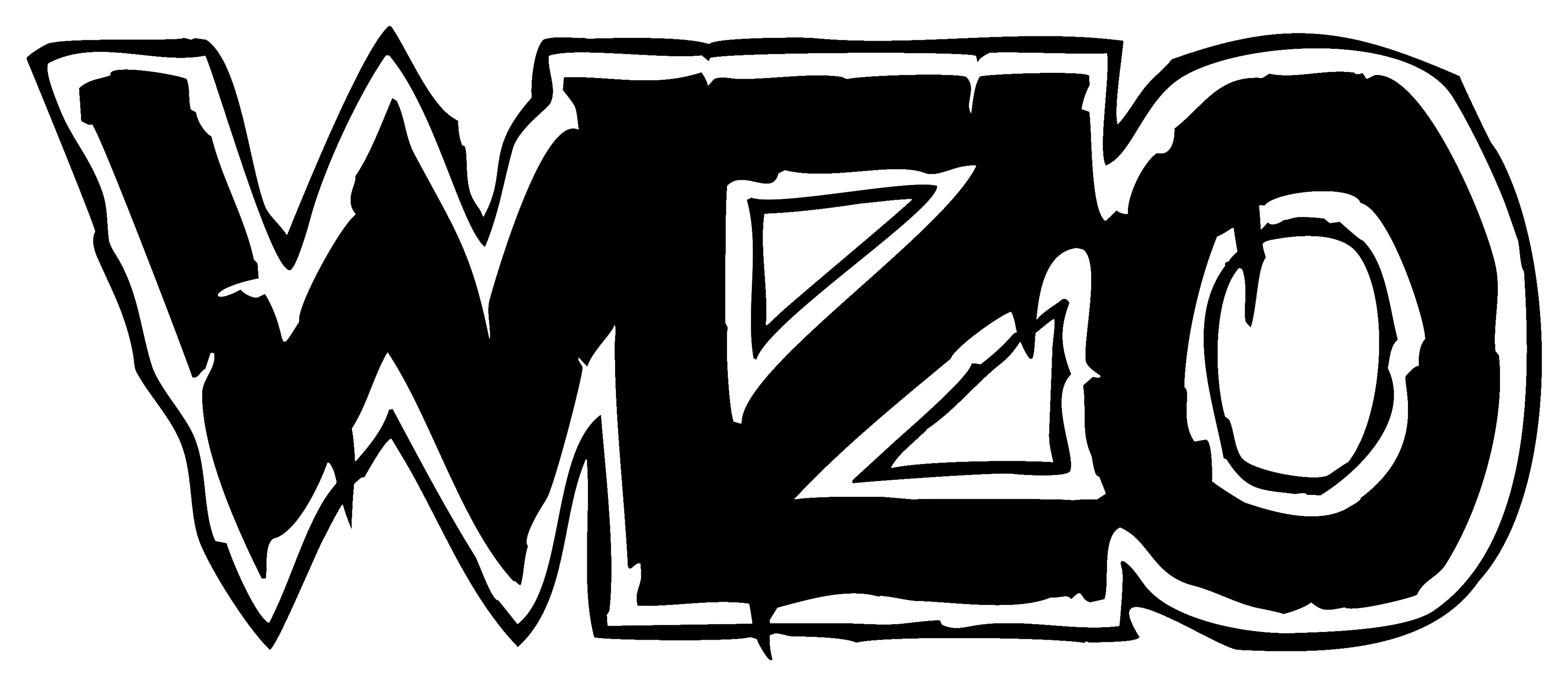
The band's logo

In 1991, WIZO released their first full-length album für'n Arsch ("In vain", literally "for an ass"). This was recorded in the studio of a friend of WIZO in Stuttgart. The band also gained attention for an illegal public performance outside of a courthouse during the road-rage trial of Manfred Krug, a TV celebrity. The band played from the bed of a delivery truck while the case was going on.

In 1992, WIZO's album, Bleib Tapfer (English translation: "Stay Brave") was released. On the first anniversary of German pop-star Roy Black's death, WIZO released the single "Roy Black ist tot" (English translation: "Roy Black Is Dead") as a dubious tribute. The tribute in question was a punk cover of a children's song with the lyrics altered to a German version of "Roy Black is dead, Roy Black is dead." It was named the worst CD of the year by the Bild-Zeitung, a major German tabloid.

In 1993, WIZO covered the pop-song All that she wants from the Swedish group Ace of Base. Their self-produced music video was played on MTV. The single of their cover gained the band recognition across Germany.

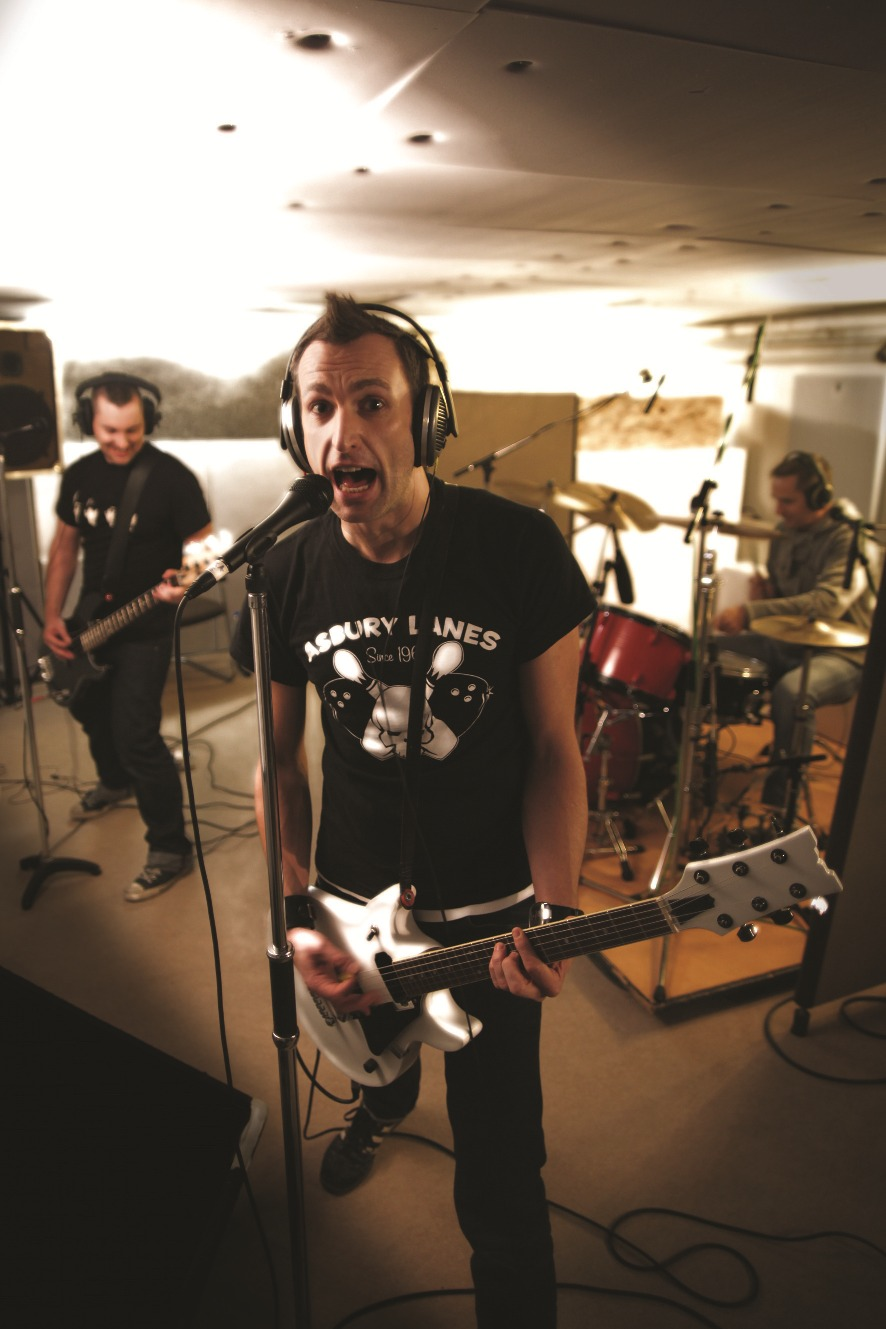
WIZO in 2010

In 1994, their next album, Uuaarrgh! (onomatopoeic, like a big "ouch", as in comics) was released, which sold 100,000 copies. For the American market, UUAARRGH! (as well as the later compilation album Kraut & Rüben) was distributed by Fat Wreck Chords, one of the most successful and influential punk labels in the world. The version of this album produced by Fat Wreck was cut from 25 songs to 13 songs, which were also different versions than the German ones.

Later that year, due to the "glorification of violence" and "illegal anti-state statements" present in the song "Kein Gerede" ("No idle talk"), the album Bleib Tapfer was indexed by the Federal Department for Media Harmful to Young Persons and was only available to be sold to adults through very restricted channels.

In 1994, WIZO performed at the Chaos Days in Hannover. This also made headlines, among other places in the Tagesschau. The band later wrote a song about this experience, titled Chaostage 94.

In 1995, WIZO released Herrenhandtasche ("Man purse") and performed on the Warped Tour. Later that year, the band opened for Die Ärzte. In the summer of 1995, WIZO toured the USA on the inaugural year of the Vans Warped Tour. Among other things, during this tour they moderated the VIVA-program "Wah Wah". After this tour they opened for Die Ärzte on their tour "Eine Frage der Ehre".

In 1996 WIZO gave a concert at the Bizarre-Festivals in Cologne in front of 35,000 people. This concert was broadcast by MTV and the WDR. When the band asked the producer and cameramen not to block the view of the audience, as they had done for NOFX, filming was stopped. Kurth and Genserowski damaged some of the cameras. Axel has said that the band was sued over this incident, and this is the reason that they no longer play large festival shows. In 1996, WIZO's lineup also changed; Ingo Hahn replaced their long-standing drummer, Charly Zasko, and he and Axel "are fortunately no longer in contact." The single Doof wie Scheiße (English translation: "Dumb as Shit") was recorded with Ingo before he left the band.

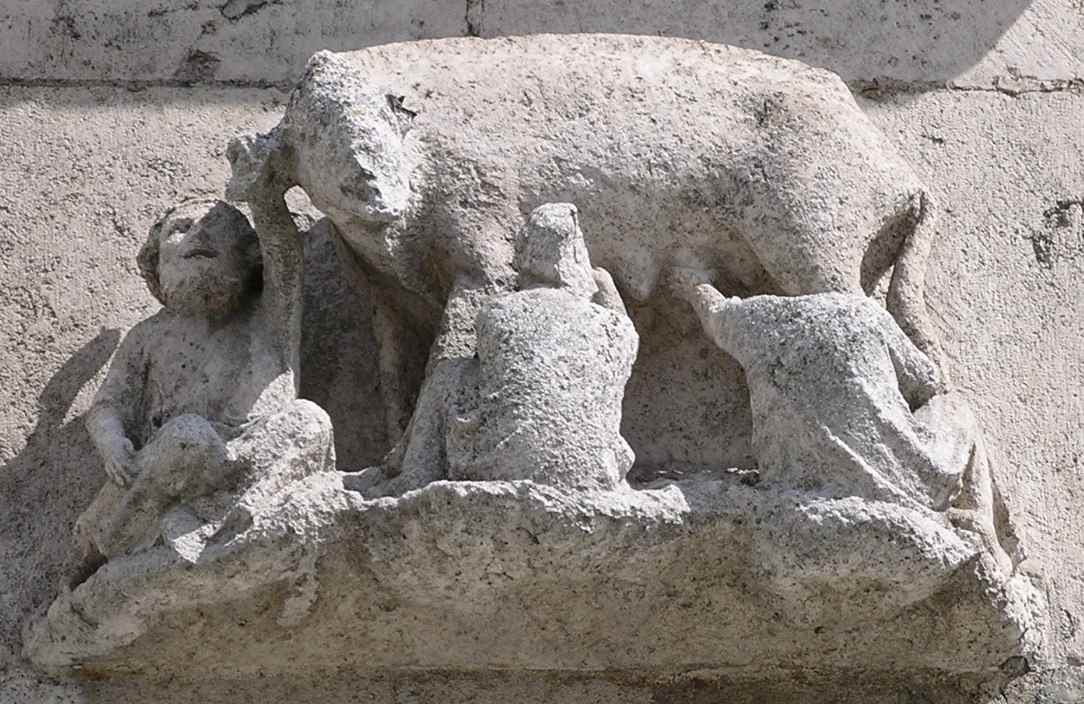
The "Judensau" on the Regensburg Cathedral

In 1997, the band released Weihnachten stinkt! ("Christmas stinks!"), a split EP with the Japanese punk band Hi-Standard. The band also received a criminal complaint from Wilhelm Gegenfurtner, the Vicar General of the Roman Catholic Diocese of Regensburg over their depiction of a crucified pig on their album Uuaarrgh! and on t-shirts, which he claimed violated Germany's blasphemy law, §166 StGB for "Defamation of religious denominations, religious societies and World view associations". The band offered to stop selling the T-shirt if the Catholic Church put a sign on the Judensau, an anti-semitic carving on the Regensburg Cathedral dating to 1330. The artwork is censored from later pressings of the album with a reference to a court decision.

In 1998, WIZO released Kraut & Rüben EP ("Cabbage and Carrots", also "higgledy piggledy") on the label Fat Wreck Chords, containing songs that were already popular in Germany, but unknown to the rest of the world. That year, Herr Guhl replaced Ingo as drummer.

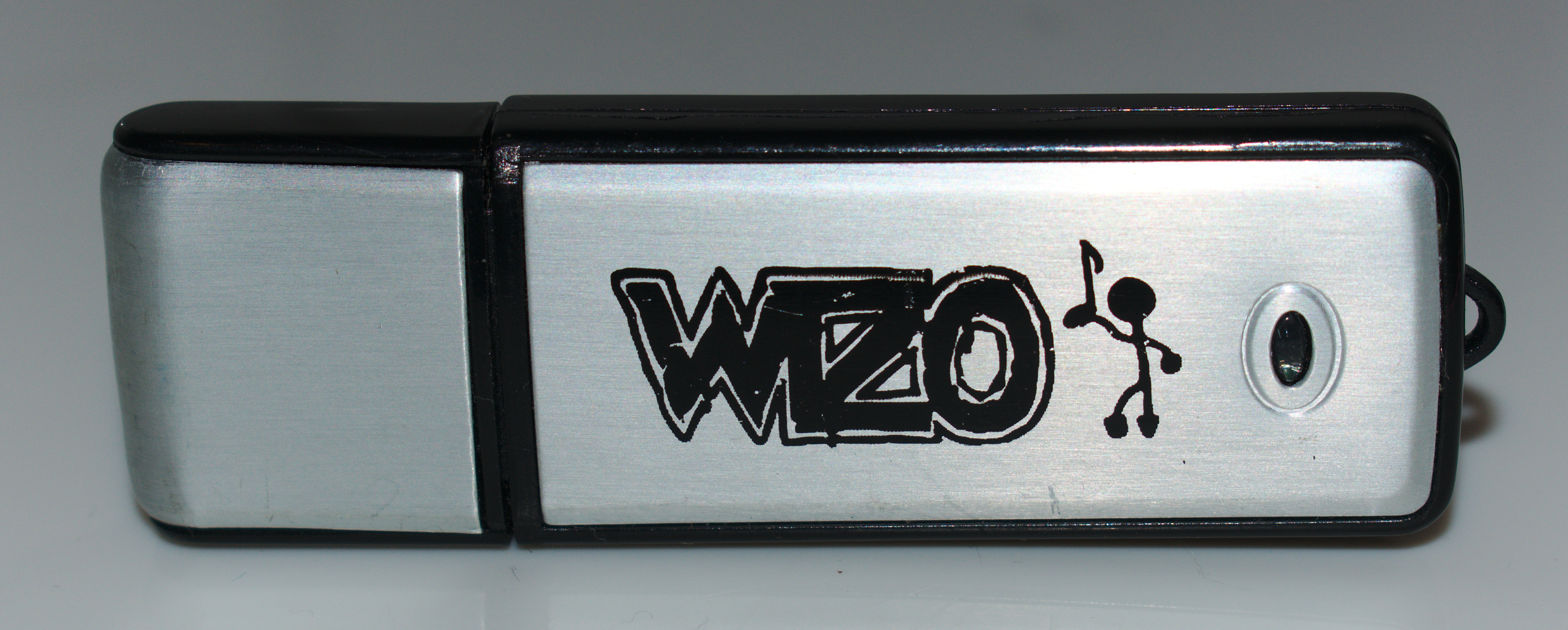
The Stick EP, released in 2004, was the first album released on a USB stick.

In September 2004, WIZO made a first in the music industry by releasing a single on USB flash drive, titled as the Stick EP. In addition to five high bitrate MP3s, it also included a video, pictures, lyrics, and tabs.

In November 2004, coinciding with the release of their album Anderster (English translation: "differenter"), WIZO announced their intent to dissolve in March 2005, upon the conclusion of a farewell tour.

=== Reunion ===
After the band dissolved in 2005, Axel Kurth released several solo songs under the pseudonym XLQ, including a song for the Soccer team VfB Stuttgart at the German Soccer Championships. This song used the melody of the WIZO song Kadett B. He also released covers of "Als ich fortging", written by Dirk Michaelis and Pour Un Flirt by Michel Delpech. At the end of 2008, XLQ played guitar for a German boy-band, was involved in writing music for the film Die Welle, and other projects.

In November 2009, WIZO announced a new album and a reunion tour for 2010 on their official Homepage. In the new line-up, bassist Jörn Genserowski was replaced by Thorsten Schwämmle.

In May 2010, the band performed at the punk festival Ruhrpott Rodeo with this new line-up. In August 2010, they played seven festivals with Ralf Dietel from the band Krashkarma as a guest guitarist; these festivals included the Rock am See in Konstanz. On 18 October 2010 a cut from the AREA4-Festival (21 August 2010 in Lüdinghausen) played on the WDR3 TV program Rockpalast; in this program the controversial song Kein Gerede was broadcast in uncensored form. On 13 December 2013 bass-player Thorsten "Karachoo" Schwämmle announced on his Facebook-page that he had left the band.

WIZO released the album Punk gibt's nicht umsonst (Teil III) ("Punk Isn't Free (Part III)") on 13 June 2014, and announced a fall tout to support the album. Ralf Dietel replaced Schwämmle on bass; although Dietel is credited as band-member in the album booklet, the bass parts were written by Axel Kurth or Thorsten Schwämmle. One song on the album, Unpoliddisch, which Axel sings in a Saxon dialect, had already been released in 2012 under the pseudonym Total Verboilt. In December 2015 Guhl left the band for family reasons, and was replaced by Alex Stinson, the drummer from the band "Start A Fire".

On 21 June 2016 the single Verwesung was released. On 25 June 2016 during the Amnesia Rockfest in Québec, the band released the new single Adagio. On 12 August 2016 WIZO released the new album Der.

In 2018, WIZO released the single "Ich war, ich bin und ich werde sein" ("I was, I am, and I will be"), a title taken from a Rosa Luxemburg quote. In 2019 the band launched their Die Schönheit des Verfalls tour of Europe. On 5 May 2023 they released the single "Grauer Brei", their first release in the last 5 years, followed by the EP "Prokrastination" on 25 May. On 5 December, they released the studio album Nichts Wird Wieder Gut, their first album after seven years.

== Lineup ==
For most of their history, the band has performed as a power trio.

== Discography ==
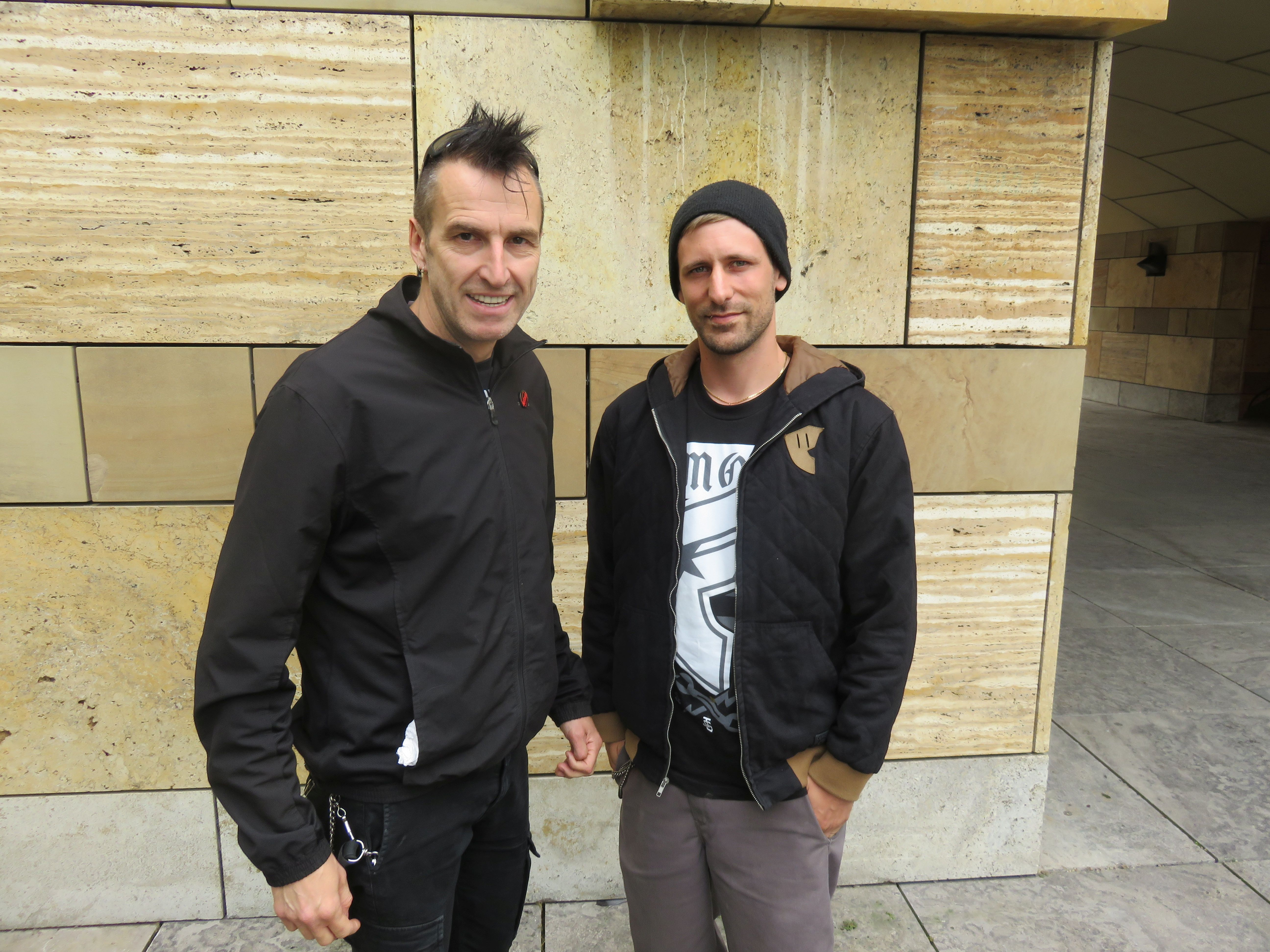
Axel Kurth and Alex Stinson in Stuttgart 2016

=== Demo Tapes ===
- Keiner ist kleiner (1988, self-released cassette)
- Du, Wir Können Doch Gute Freunde Bleiben (1990, self-released cassette)

=== Studio albums ===
1. für'n Arsch (1991, Hulk Räckorz)
2. Bleib Tapfer (1992, Hulk Räckorz)
3. Uuaarrgh! (1994, Hulk Räckorz)
4. Herrenhandtasche (1995, Hulk Räckorz)
5. Anderster (2004, Hulk Räckorz)
6. Punk gibt's nicht umsonst! (Teil III) (2014, Hulk Räckorz)
7. Der (2016, Hulk Räckorz)
8. Nichts Wird Wieder Gut (2023, Hulk Räckorz)

=== Compilations, Best-of, and Live Albums ===
1. Sterntalern Live in Herrenberg (cassette, 1988)
2. WIZO-Raritäten (MC, only available through the fan club, 1996)
3. Mindhalálig Punk (split with Aurora) (1994/1997, LMS/Aurora Records)
4. Kraut & Rüben (CD / LP, 1998)

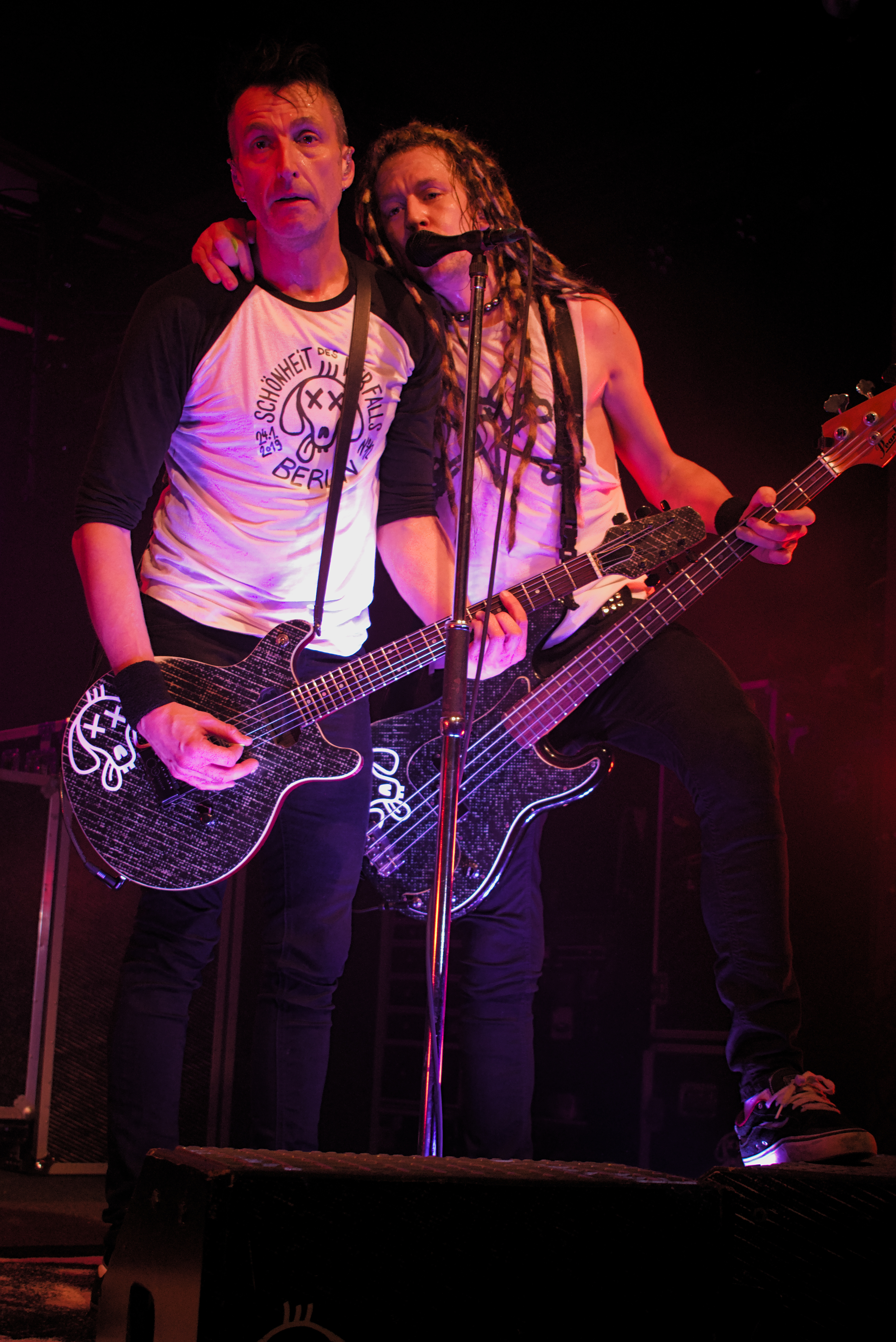
WIZO performing in Berlin 2019

=== Singles/EPs ===
- Klebstoff (7", 1991)
- Roy Black ist tot (7", 1992)
- All That She Wants EP (1993)
- Das goldene Stück Scheiße (7", 1994)
- Hey Thomas (Maxi-CD, 1994)
- Doof wie Scheiße (7", 1996)
- Weihnachten stinkt! (split EP with Hi-Standard) (1997)
- Kraut & Rüben EP (1998)
- Stick EP (USB-Stick, 2004)
- Adagio (MP3, 2016)
- Ich war, ich bin und ich werde sein (7" / Digital, 2018)
- Grauer Brei (Digital, 2023)

=== Samplers ===
- Peinlich peinlich ist hier alles (cassette, 1989)
- Intoxicate You (cassette, 1990)
- Schlachtrufe BRD II (Kein Gerede – Live, 1992)
- Schön War Die Zeit.... Punk Im Don Quijote 1990-1991 (cassette, 1992)
- Willkommen zur Alptraummelodie (1992)
- Drink Together - Puke Together. More Flogging Pinheads (cassette, 1992)
- Vitaminepillen #3 (1993)
- Bring back the Vinyl (OK Fred, 1994)
- Punk Uprisings (1995)
- Flashing in the pit (1995)
- Vitaminepillen #4 (1995)
- Pogo Strut Slam Swivel and Mosh (1995)
- Survival of the fattest (1995)
- Punk Chartbusters Vol. 2 (1995)
- Partisanen III (1996)
- GötterDÄmmerung - Tribut An Die Beste Band Der Welt (Anneliese Schmidt, Ärzte-Tribut, 1997)
- Stay Wild! (1997)
- Moto XXX Soundtrack (1998)
- Short Music for Short People (The Count, 1998)
- Fat Music Vol. IV: Life in the fat lane (Fat Wreck Chords, 1999)
- Rock Explosion (2000)
- Fat Music Volume V: Live fat, Die Young (Fat Wreck Chords, 2001)
- Pankerknacker Hörspiel-CD (audiobook, 2002)
- Fat Music Volume VI: Uncontrollable Fatulance (Fat Wreck Chords, 2002)
- Aggropop Now (2003)
- Punk Rock BRD Vol. 1 (Weird System, 2003)
- Nazis Raus! (Weird System, 2004)
- Undercover (2004)
- Punk Rock BRD Vol. 2 (Weird System, 2004)
- Rotten Schwuchtel Sampler (Gay Edge Liberation, 2009)
- Wrecktrospective (Fat Wreck Chords, 2009)
- Kein Bock auf Nazis Sampler (free, limited to 30,000 pressings, 2014)
