= Wiedehopf Im Mai – Sandie Shaw Singt Auf Deutsch =

Wiedehopf Im Mai - Sandie Shaw Singt Auf Deutsch

Compilation album by Sandie Shaw
- Released: 2004
- Genre: Pop
- Length: 1:18:36
- Label: EMI

Sandie Shaw chronology
La Cantante Scalza – Canta In Italiano (2003)	Wiedehopf Im Mai - Sandie Shaw Singt Auf Deutsch (2004)	Marionetas En La Cuerda – Sandie Shaw Canta En Español (2004)

Wiedehopf im Mai – Sandie Shaw singt auf Deutsch is a compilation album by the British pop singer Sandie Shaw featuring all her German language recordings, many of which are versions of her hits. The album was released in 2004 by EMI.

The album's title — which literally translates to "Hoopoe In May" — is a reference to the title of German version of her winning Eurovision song from 1967, "Puppet on a String".

== Track listing ==
1. "Einmal glücklich sein wie die Andern"
2. "Ohne Dich"
3. "Das ist unmöglich"
4. "Du weißt nichts von Deinem Glück"
5. "Man hat erzählt"
6. "Mir ist alles klar"
7. "Und sowas nennst Du nun Liebe"
8. "Wir seh'n uns ja wieder"
9. "Ich denke an morgen"
10. "Wiedehopf im Mai"
11. "Was kann ich dafür"
12. "Du bist wunderbar"
13. "Dein anderes Gesicht"
14. "Stop"
15. "Heute"
16. "London"
17. "An jenem Tag"
18. "Du lügst so wunderbar"
19. "Mein Fischlein in dem See"
20. "Ich sage stop"
21. "Du hast niemals Zeit für mich"
22. "Das große Glück bist Du"
23. "Alles was ich will ist Deine Liebe"
24. "Die ganz keinen Dinge nur"
25. "Du kommst morgen"
26. "Dadurch erst wird es schön"
27. "Durch die Kraft und Herrlichkeit"
28. "Hello Bambino"
29. "Sommerwind"
