= Tape trading =

Method of distribution of musical or video content

Tape trading is an unofficial method of distribution of musical or video content through the postal system, which was prominent in the 1980s and 1990s. Although most commonly used to distribute and publicize limited-release musical demo tapes in underground musical genres such as punk, indie rock, hardcore, post-noise, and extreme metal, the system has also been used to distribute bootleg recordings of live concerts, recordings of radio broadcasts, original radio-style programming by amateur broadcasters, and videotapes of underground films and pornography.

The practice faded in prominence in the 2000s, as the rise of Internet technologies such as audio and video streaming, file sharing services and podcasting largely supplanted the need to mail out physical copies of recorded content. However, a smaller scale network of tape traders still exists as a sort of nostalgic hobby among fans of some musical genres.

== History ==
Tape trading was a postal system reliant, penfriend style nature of an underground network that relied heavily on the cooperation of fans of different musical genres worldwide as well as the acts being promoted this way themselves eschewing any copyright in order to further spread their notoriety. Acts that gained a following through this might land a record deal.

The ad hoc system relied on a system of trust, meaning that tapes were swapped in a kind of honor system; those who did not subscribe to this ethos and received tapes without returning the favor accordingly would become known as 'rip-offs' or 'rip-off traders' and were regarded with scorn. Flyers advertising gigs, recordings and other merchandises for sale were often swapped in conjunction with tape trading. Music that had been licensed to record companies (therefore subject to copyright) and released in the format of Vinyl records, CD and MC (musicassette) was also pirated onto blank compact cassette medium and traded, although this was in infringement of both unofficial 'rules' of the network and actual copyright law itself.

Many traders would, unrequested, fill unused space on the C-60 and C-90 tapes of demos they compiled for fellow traders with local bands in which they were members, or acolytes of. This led to a musical cross-pollination between geographically diverse and disparate areas such as Scandinavia, USA and the UK and their own bands/scenes. One notable example of how initial contact through tape trading lent to this trend is in the case of Righteous Pigs guitarist Mitch Harris who hailed from Las Vegas and Birmingham's Mick Harris, drummer with Napalm Death (not related) who would later collaborate writing and recording music, Mitch Harris would eventually relocate to the UK for this purpose. The very nature of the system ensured that recordings would decrease in sound quality with each trade and would in extreme circumstance become almost unlistenable, although the advent of recordable CDs helped the preservation of sound quality of recordings throughout trades. The popularization of broadband internet and digital music in its various forms has led to music by unsigned acts being swapped electronically and therefore tape trading through the postal system is considered by most to be outdated.

Heavy metal tape trading (notably black metal, death metal, doom metal) through the postal system is still in practice, but mainly as a nostalgic hobby. Most contact is made via email or penfriend-style mail conversation.

== Radio ==
Tape trading was also in some respects an early precursor of podcasting, as the method could be used to redistribute radio programs to fans outside of a radio station's local broadcast area, or even as the main distribution method of non-broadcast amateur programming. This form of trading was especially, but not exclusively, used as an underground distribution method for content that was politically censored: for instance, the Cassette Education Trust, an anti-apartheid activist organization in South Africa, used tape trading as the "broadcast" platform for its political and cultural programming prior to its launch as Bush Radio, the country's first licensed community radio station, and the Hungarian punk rock band CPg used its tape trading network to redistribute anti-Communist political commentary from Radio Free Europe alongside its music.

== Video ==
A related phenomenon of videotape trading also existed, to redistribute underground films in specialty genres such as cult films, foreign films or pornography, as well as episodes of professional wrestling and television game shows, which until the 1970s were routinely destroyed and thus very few episodes of most series from that era remain.

The cult sci-fi comedy series Mystery Science Theater 3000, which was broadcast on the then-niche Comedy Central cable channel and was often unable to repeat episodes due to rights disputes over the movies they made fun of, contained an explicit instruction in its closing credits to "keep circulating the tapes" which helped the show build and maintain its fanbase.

Independent wrestling events, foreign wrestling and C-shows from the WWF and WCW were often not archived as much as their mainstream wrestling shows and matches, even up to and during the late 1990s and early 2000s boom period. Several months of episodes of C-shows such as WWF Shotgun Saturday Night were presumed lost for decades until tape traders and collectors uploaded them to YouTube and Internet Archive.

Some wrestlers, such as "Dr. Death" Steve Williams, encouraged fans to record their shows as a way to both promote the company and to preserve the wrestlers' legacies. At this point in Williams' career, he had suffered an infamous injury and then appeared primarily on WWF B-shows and C-shows upon healing. In January 2000, Williams returned to his home promotion of All Japan Pro Wrestling (AJPW). In a promo at the start of a syndicated edition of an AJPW pay-per-view, aired on September 2, 2000, Williams reflected negatively about ECW, WCW and WWF and their style at the time, speaking about his future in AJPW, "Don't turn off that TV. Don't turn off your VCR tape. Start watching All Japan. New members. New faces."
