= Aurora (punk band) =

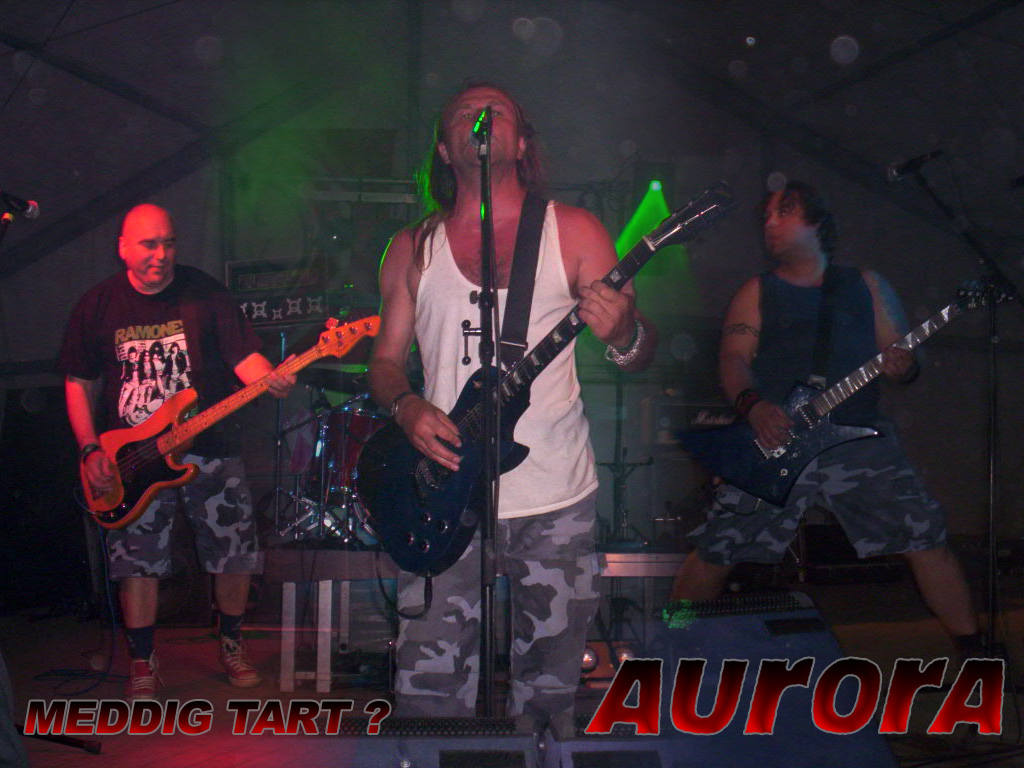
- Aurora 2005 concert

Background information
- Origin: Győr, Hungary
- Genres: Punk rock; Hardcore punk
- Years active: 1983–present
- Labels: Hungaroton; K&E Records; Aurora Records
- Website: Aurora.hu

Aurora is a punk band formed in Győr, Hungary in 1983.

== Early history ==
Aurora Cirkáló was founded in Győr, Hungary by the young local punks “Vigi” (guitar vocals), “Galacs” (bass), “Polyak” (drums) and “Dauer” (vocals). This was in 1983, at the height of the Hungarian punk blast, a period in which a punk gig caused big agitation, occasionally by starting riots.

“ We started criticizing the Soviet Army a little bit too early. It wasn’t really a surprise when the authorities sent us for a trial because of anticommunist lyrics. Our original singer “Dauer” had to spend two years in prison because according to the authorities he had chosen the “wrong words”, Vigi reminds of the old, “romantic” days.

Other punks did not have as much luck as Aurora: Two members of the Hungarian punk band CPg were found guilty and sent to prison for two years because of making jokes about communists. After having stayed in prison the members of CPg had to leave Hungary and so did the Aurora's former singer “Dauer”. Therefore, “Aurora” needed a new vocalist and found it in the attractive blond female singer called “Kriszta”, but she also left the band after a very short time. “She was a very wild and fascinating person on stage, but she didn’t take her job as seriously as we did.” says Vigi “so that finally I had to sing because we couldn’t find any suitable substitute for her. Since then we have playing as a trio.

Some unreleased songs on the “Best Of” compilation are taken from this period like “Kis Kurva”.

Between 1984 and 1988 the band was playing under false names in order not to attract the attention of the “old friends”, the Hungarian Secret Service. At this time the band caught the attention of some Austrian punks who invited “Aurora” to play in Vienna. This was the first time the band played a concert outside Eastern Europe.

“Aurora” became a regular and famous guest in Vienna and went on their first big Germany-tour in 1988 with the help of some German friends. The money they made on tour was spent on recording their first self-titled EP in Germany. Under the assistance Hardly Heinlin and released on the German label “Empty Records”. “At this time it was nearly impossible to record in state-controlled studios in Hungary”, Vigi says, “Our debut EP may sound a little bit strong and brutal because we recorded it live in the studio, but we prefer this kind of full sound and we like its atmosphere, its feeling.”

The EP was not very successful in contrast to their first album, the legendary “Viszlát Iván” (Goodbye Ivan)-LP which was released in 1989. The release of this record coincided with the departure of the Soviet troops from Hungary after 40 years of occupation. On account of the uncompromising lyrics, the simple but well-crafted music and the perfect timing of the release of the record it became a huge success: more than 20.000 copies were sold, probably the best-selling release ever in Eastern Europe. “We just couldn’t believe it” says Vigi, “ so many people came to our gigs. We felt like someone changed our rubber boots into ballet shoes.”

“Viszlát Iván” was highly acclaimed in US-zines like the “Maximumrockandroll”, Suburban Voice” and “Flipside”. It was supposed to be licensed by a US label, but in the end the idea was not realised.

After “Goodbye Ivan” there was a longer break. The following album, “Előre Kurvák, Gengszterek” (Forward Prostitutes, Gangsters) was released after three years of hard work and it ever surpassed the “Goodbye Ivan”-LP, especially because its fantastic producing and engineering. The “Gangsters” – CD was also released on “Hulk Räckorz”, Germany. “Mindhalálig Punk” (Punk Forever) was the title of the split CD with their German friends WIZO in 1994.

In the mid-1990s “Aurora” wanted to reach out a bigger audience by making some “rock” records such as “Fel Támadás” (Get Up Attack) and “Keserű Cukor” (Bitter Sugar). But in 1996 they decided to return to their original punk style. The new album “Nincs Karácsony” (No X-mas) was nominated as “Punk album of the year” in Hungary. The hyper-melodicas well as strong songs reminded the listener of “Aurora” best years. The highlight of the CD was the excellent trumpet-playing by the band's new member “Qka” which was even more spectacular on the 1997's follow-up album “Illegális Bál” (Illegal Party/Ball).

== Members ==
=== Current members ===
- László Víg (Vigi) – lead guitar, vocals (1982-)
- Szabolcs Goreczky (Kisbé) – bass, trumpet, backing vocals (formerly guitar) (1996-)
- Norbert Víg (Kisróra) - drums (2008-)

=== Former members ===
- János Demeter (Dauer) – vocals (1982)
- Attila Polyák – drums (1982–1993)
- Kriszta Botos – vocals (1983–1984)
- Blinker – drums (1993–1999)
- Csaba Matula – rhythm guitar (2002–2003)
- Zoltán Kovács (Kiskovács) – drums (1999–2008)
- János Pozsgay (Galacs) – bass guitar, backing vocals (1982–2011)
- Szilard Bognar - bass guitar

== Discography ==
- "1988" (1988)
- "Viszlát Iván" (1989)
- "Előre Kurvák, Gengszterek" (1992)
- "Fel Támadás" (1993)
- "Mindhalálig Punk" (1994, with Wizo)
- "Keserű Cukor" (1995)
- "Nincs Karácsony" (1996)
- "Illegális Bál" (1997)
- "Válogatás '83-'99" (1999)
- "Balkán Express" (1999)
- "Rúkenstúrcli In Kukenstrasse" (1999)
- "A Rezervátum Mélyén" (2002)
- "Meddig Tart?" (2004)
- "Tűréshatáron Túl" (2008)
- "Esszencia 1983-2012" (2012)
- "Még nem ez a tréfa vége" (2013)
- "Őrűlt világ" (2014)
- "Se fájdalom, se félelem" (2016)
- "Más világ" (2020)
- "Teszt alatt a türelem" (2021)

== See also ==
- Punk ideology
