= Für'n Arsch =

für'n Arsch

Studio album by Wizo
- Released: 1991
- Recorded: July 1991, August 1991
- Genre: Punk rock
- Length: 34:40
- Label: Hulk Räckorz
- Producer: Wizo

Wizo chronology
für'n Arsch (1991)	Bleib tapfer (1992)

für'n Arsch is the debut album by the German punk rock band Wizo. "für'n Arsch" (lit. "for the ass") is a vulgar expression meaning "in vain".

== Track listing ==
1. "Diese Welt" (This World) – 2:59
2. "I want You to be ma girl" – 2:28
3. "Gute Freunde" (Good Friends) – 4:04
4. "Good Bye" – 2:57
5. "Der Käfer" (The Beetle) – 0:28
6. "Kadett B" – 2:28
7. "K.I.K.III" (N.I.S.III) – 2:13
8. "Kein Gerede" (No Talking) – 2:45
9. "Walter" – 3:59
10. "Jupp" – 1:19
11. "Selenbrant" (Burning Souls) – 3:27
12. "Unemployed" – 2:01
13. "Sylvia" – 3:32
