= Herrenhandtasche =

Studio album by Wizo
- Released: September 1, 1995
- Genre: Punk rock
- Length: 24:52
- Label: Hulk Räckorz
- Producer: Fratz A. Thum

Wizo chronology
Uuaarrgh! (1994)	Herrenhandtasche (1995)	Anderster (2004)

Herrenhandtasche (or Herrénhandtasche) – as it says on the album cover – is the fourth studio album by the German punk rock band Wizo, released in 1995, and means "manpurse" in English.

== Track listing ==
1. Hello - 0:19
2. 9247 - 3:15
3. Poupée de Cire (cover of the France Gall song Poupée de cire, poupée de son) - 2:27
4. Quadrat im Kreis (square in the circle) - 3:27
5. Cruising - 2:16
6. Anrufbeantworter (answering machine) - 0:27
7. Herrénhandtasche (man-purse) - 4:32
8. Closet - 2:42
9. Brief/Telefon/Tür (letter/phone/door) - 4:06
10. Do You Remember Me? - 2:21

== Lineup ==
- Axel Kurth - vocals, guitars
- Jörn Genserowski - bass, chorus
- Charly Zasko - drums, chorus

== Trivia ==
Herrenhandtasche literally means "manpurse" but it is also used in German referring to a sixpack (as in beer).
