= Where Did They Go (song) =

Single by Sandie Shaw
- B-side: "Look At Me"
- Released: 1972
- Genre: Pop
- Label: Pye
- Songwriter(s): Gloria Sklerov, Harry Lloyd
- Producer(s): Herbie Flowers, Roger Coulam

Sandie Shaw singles chronology
"Show Your Face" (1971)	"Where Did They Go" (1972)	"Father And Son" (1972)

"Where Did They Go" is a song written by Gloria Sklerov and Harry Lloyd. It was first recorded by American singer Peggy Lee, and later covered by the British singer Sandie Shaw, and the group, Blue Mink (two members of which together produced the Sandie Shaw version). In 1981, Diana Dors released a version in the UK on single, claiming at the time the song had been written specifically for her.

== Other versions ==
Hans Alfredson and Tage Danielsson wrote a Swedish version with the title "Var blev ni av" (where did you end up) recorded in 1976 by Monica Zetterlund from the show Svea Hund played at Göta Lejon.
