= Marionetas En La Cuerda – Sandie Shaw Canta En Español =

Marionetas en la cuerda – Sandie Shaw canta en Español

Compilation album by Sandie Shaw
- Released: 2004
- Genre: Pop
- Label: EMI

Sandie Shaw chronology
Wiedehopf Im Mai – Sandie Shaw Singt Auf Deutsch (2004)	Marionetas en la cuerda – Sandie Shaw canta en Español (2004)	Nothing Comes Easy (2004)

Marionetas en la cuerda – Sandie Shaw canta en Español is a Spanish-language album by the British singer Sandie Shaw. It is a compilation of her recordings in this language, featuring Spanish versions of many of her hits.

== Track listing ==
1. "No vendrá" - ("Girl Don't Come")
2. "Ante nada me detendré" - ("I'll Stop at Nothing")
3. "¡Viva el amor!" - ("Long Live Love")
4. "No lo comprendí" - ("Message Understood")
5. "No me quieres más" - ("You Don't Want Me No More")
6. "No necesito tu amor" - ("I Don't Need That Kind of Lovin'")
7. "Mañana" - ("Tomorrow")
8. "Lo conseguí" - ("Nothing Comes Easy")
9. "Marionetas en la cuerda" - ("Puppet on a String")
10. "A los chicos les dirás" - ("Tell the Boys")
11. "Otra vez soñé" - ("Had a Dream Last Night")
12. "Dile a cualquiera" - ("Ask Any Woman")
13. "Esta noche en Tokyo" - ("Tonight in Tokyo")
14. "La has vuelto a ver" - ("You've Been Seeing Her Again")
15. "No has cambiado nada" - ("You've Not Changed")
16. "Londres" - ("London")
17. "Así, así" - ("That's Why")
18. "Parale" - ("Hold Him Down")
19. "Qué tiempo tan feliz" - ("Those Were the Days")
20. "Ojos gitanos" - ("Gypsy Eyes")
21. "Monsieur Dupont"
22. "Dejate ya" - ("Think It All Over")
23. "Qué efecto me hará" - ("Che effetto mi fa")
24. "Un mañana" - ("By Tomorrow")
25. "El poder y la gloria" - ("Show Your Face")
