= Reviewing the Situation (album) =

Studio album by Sandie Shaw
- Released: 1969
- Genre: Pop
- Label: Pye
- Producer: Sandie Shaw

Sandie Shaw chronology
The Sandie Shaw Supplement (1968)	Reviewing the Situation (1969)	Choose Life (1983)

Reviewing the Situation is the fifth original album by 1960s British singer Sandie Shaw. Released in late 1969 by Pye Records, it contained material very different from that which pop-lovers were accustomed to hearing from Shaw. This was Shaw's first time producing an album herself and she chose to cover songs made popular by more alternative artists who she felt had had a big impact on the music of the 1960s.

== Track listing ==
No.	Title	Writer(s)	Length
1.	"Reviewing the Situation"	Lionel Bart	3:33
2.	"Lay Lady Lay"	Bob Dylan	3:53
3.	"Mama Roux"	Creux, Jessie Hill	3:22
4.	"Sun in My Eyes"	Gibb, Gibb, Gibb	2:48
5.	"Walking the Dog"	Rufus Thomas	3:47
6.	"Love Me Do"	John Lennon, Paul McCartney	2:32
7.	"Oh Gosh"	Donovan	1:46
8.	"Your Time Is Gonna Come"	John Paul Jones, Jimmy Page	3:35
9.	"Coconut Grove"	John Sebastian, Zal Yanovsky	2:26
10.	"Sympathy for the Devil"	Mick Jagger, Keith Richards	5:47

CD bonus tracks for one CD reissue
No.	Title	Writer(s)	Length
11.	"Frank Mills"	Galt MacDermot, James Rado, Gerome Ragni	1:52
12.	"Junk"	Paul McCartney	2:01

CD bonus tracks for later CD reissue
No.	Title	Writer(s)	Length
11.	"Frank Mills"	Galt MacDermot, James Rado, Gerome Ragni	1:58
12.	"Junk"	Paul McCartney	2:00
13.	"Heaven Knows I'm Missing Him Now"		2:38
14.	"So Many Things to Do"		3:07
15.	"By Tomorrow"	Peter Callander, Mitch Murray	2:54
16.	"Maple Village"		2:58
17.	"Wight Is Wight"		2:49
18.	"That's The Way He's Made"		2:37
19.	"The Fool on the Hill"		3:28
20.	"Love Is For the Two of Us"		2:52

== Personnel ==
- Sandie Shaw – vocals
- Geoff Peach – tenor saxophone, flute, vocals
- Rodney Hill – guitar
- Brent Pickthall – bass guitar, backing vocals
- Ian Wallace – drums
