= Flirt! (song) =

Single by Jonathan King
- B-side: "Hey Jim!"
- Released: 1972
- Genre: Pop
- Label: Decca
- Songwriter(s): Jonathan King, Michel Delpech, Roland Vincent
- Producer(s): Jonathan King

"Flirt!" is a song and single written by Jonathan King, Michel Delpech and Roland Vincent and performed by King. Released in 1972 it reached 22, on the UK charts, staying there for nine weeks. The song is a cover of a French song, Pour un Flirt, by Delpech and Vincent, to which King added English lyrics.
