= By Tomorrow =

1970 song by Sandie Shaw

Single by Sandie Shaw
- B-side: "Maple Village"
- Released: February 1970
- Genre: Pop
- Label: Pye
- Songwriters: Peter Callander, Mitch Murray

Sandie Shaw singles chronology
"Heaven Knows I'm Missing Him Now" (1969)	"By Tomorrow" (1970)	"Wight Is Wight" (1970)

"By Tomorrow" is a single by British singer Sandie Shaw. This was her first single of the 1970s after a highly successful string of singles the previous decade. Although it is a favourite amongst fans and was featured on Top of the Pops at the time of its release, it was not a commercial success.
