= Show Your Face =

1971 single by Sandie Shaw

Single by Sandie Shaw
- B-side: "Dear Madame"
- Released: 1971
- Genre: Pop
- Label: Pye
- Songwriters: Herbie Flowers, Dougie Wright
- Producer: Herbie Flowers

Sandie Shaw singles chronology
"Rose Garden" (1971)	"Show Your Face" (1971)	"Where Did They Go" (1972)

"Show Your Face" is a single by British singer Sandie Shaw. It was released in 1971 and did not have the impact on the chart that many of her singles had the previous decade. Although the song had a religious theme, Shaw has stated that she is not a Christian and was not one at the time the song was recorded.
