= Please Help the Cause Against Loneliness =

Single by Sandie Shaw

from the album Hello Angel
- B-side: "Lover of the Century"
- Released: 1988
- Genre: Pop
- Label: Rough Trade
- Songwriters: Morrissey, Stephen Street
- Producer: Stephen Street

Sandie Shaw singles chronology
"Frederick" (1986)	"Please Help the Cause Against Loneliness" (1988)	"Nothing Less Than Brilliant" (1988)

"Please Help the Cause Against Loneliness" is a song by British singer Sandie Shaw and the first single from her 1988 album Hello Angel. Having released a string of hit singles in the 1960s, Shaw had semi-retired from public life in the early 1970s and had released only a few records with minimal publicity since.

"Please Help the Cause Against Loneliness" was the first single to be released from the album, and was written by Morrissey and producer Stephen Street. Morrissey also recorded a demo for his first original album, which was not officially released until the 2010 expanded reissue of Morrissey's Bona Drag.

Shaw has stated that this is one of her favourite songs.

== Charts ==
Chart (1988)	Peak position
UK Singles (OCC)	86
