= The Sandie Shaw Supplement =

- Genre: Music
- Directed by: Mel Cornish
- Presented by: Sandie Shaw
- Country of origin: United Kingdom
- Original language: English
- No. of episodes: 6

Production
- Producer: Mel Cornish
- Production locations: BBC Television Centre, London
- Running time: 25 minutes

Original release
- Network: BBC1
- Release: 10 September – 15 October 1968

The Sandie Shaw Supplement is a television show hosted by the British singer Sandie Shaw in 1968; and also the name of her fourth original album released in November of that year by Pye Records, and re-issued shortly afterwards on the Marble Arch label. The TV show included Shaw singing the songs from the album.

Most of the shows have since been erased by the BBC, after Shaw asked for them to put the film on videotape. Only two episodes (episodes 2 & 3) have survived, after being returned to the BBC from overseas in the early 1990s. Episode 2 was shown on BBC2 shortly after being recovered. The audio tracks to some episodes have survived and pirate versions can sometimes be found on the internet but are generally hard to find.

== Television episodes ==
Broadcast Tuesdays on BBC1 at 9:55 pm, with the exception of episode 6 broadcast at 11:00 pm.

| No. overall | No. in series | Title | Directed by | Original release date |
|---|---|---|---|---|
| 1 | 1 | "Eyes, Nose, Mouth and a Heartbeat" | Mel Cornish | 10 September 1968 |
With the music of love and sex, Sandie looks at love and love looks right back at Sandie. And everybody searches for definitions. Love is the Moment of Truth, which leads a person to see it like it isn't, through rose-coloured contact lenses. Love is bodies and babies and soul and spirit and Mrs. Robinson. Love and Sandie stare it out. Do they come to a conclusion? Does a revelation take place? Don't miss tonight's exciting episode...! This week's guests: Alan Price and The Embraceables.
| 2 | 2 | "Quicksand" | Mel Cornish | 17 September 1968 |
Sandie Shaw with the music of speed and travel. From here to there with Sandie, travelling lady. Down Route 66 to San Jose in a Tijuana Taxi, she's a Homeward Bound Day Tripper with a Ticket To Ride on Trains and Boats and Planes. And if the Girl Don’t Come – she'll have made her Getaway. Or hit a quicksand. This week's guests: John Walker & The Roadrunners.
| 3 | 3 | "Salt, Pepper and a Touch of Garlic" | Mel Cornish | 24 September 1968 |
Sandie with the music of the Continent. One highlight tonight is Sandie singing a multi-lingual version of her famous 'Puppet on a String'. Special guest stars from Italy: Tony Renis & Los Danzantes.
| 4 | 4 | "Reflections" | Mel Cornish | 1 October 1968 |
Stand by for Stardust as Sandie pays tribute to the legendary ladies she admires. This week's guests: Chris Andrews & The Refractions.
| 5 | 5 | "Sandcastles in the Air" | Mel Cornish | 8 October 1968 |
Sandie with the music of fantasy and make-believe. This week's guests: Paul Jones & The Daydreams.
| 6 | 6 | "A Large Slice of Bread" | Mel Cornish | 15 October 1968 |
Sandie with the music of money and glamour. This week's guests from America: Nilsson & The Croupiers.

Episode 2 was repeated on BBC2 Monday, 30 August 1993 and on BBC Four Saturday, 25 April 2009.

The Sandie Shaw Supplement

Studio album by Sandie Shaw
- Released: 1968
- Genre: Pop
- Label: Pye
- Producer: Evelyn Taylor

Sandie Shaw chronology
| Love Me, Please Love Me (1967) | The Sandie Shaw Supplement (1968) | Reviewing the Situation (1969) |

== Album track listing ==
1. "(Get Your Kicks On) Route 66" (Bobby Troup)
2. "Homeward Bound" (Paul Simon)
3. "Scarborough Fair" (Art Garfunkel, Paul Simon)
4. "Right to Cry" (Gerry Goffin, Carole King)
5. "The Same Things" (Chris Andrews)
6. "Our Song of Love" (Bill Martin, Phil Coulter)
7. "(I Can't Get No) Satisfaction" (Mick Jagger, Keith Richards)
8. "Words" (Barry Gibb, Robin Gibb, Maurice Gibb)
9. "Remember Me" (Chris Andrews)
10. "Change of Heart" (Carole Bayer, Toni Wine)
11. "Aranjuez Mon Amour" (Joaquín Rodrigo)
12. "What Now My Love" (Carl Sigman, Gilbert Bécaud, Pierre Delanoë)

== Bonus tracks for CD reissue (Singles and B-Sides) ==
1. "Show Me" (Chris Andrews) mono
2. "One More Lie" (Chris Andrews) mono
3. "Together" (Harry Nilsson)
4. "Turn On The Sunshine" (Chris Andrews) mono
5. "Make It Go" (Chris Andrews)
6. "Those Were The Days" (Gene Raskin)
7. "Monsieur Dupont" (Christian Bruhn, Peter Callander) mono
8. "Voice In The Wind" (Chris Andrews)
9. "Think It All Over" (Chris Andrews)
10. "Send Me A Letter" (Chris Andrews)
11. "Any Time, Any Place, Anywhere" (Chris Andrews) mono
