= Love Me, Please Love Me (Sandie Shaw album) =

Studio album by Sandie Shaw
- Released: 1967
- Genre: Pop
- Label: Pye
- Producer: Ken Woodman

Sandie Shaw chronology
Puppet on a String (1967)	Love Me, Please Love Me (1967)	The Sandie Shaw Supplement (1968)

Love Me, Please Love Me is the third original album or LP by 1960s British singer Sandie Shaw. It was issued by Pye Records in November 1967, several months after Shaw's triumph in that year's Eurovision Song Contest. The album mainly contains cover versions of popular songs made by other artists, like Michel Polnareff's "Love Me, Please Love Me", even though two songs are written by Chris Andrews, who was Shaw's personal songwriter for much of the 1960s.

== Track listing ==
1. "Love Me, Please Love Me" (Barbara Moore, Michel Polnareff)
2. "One Note Samba" (Antônio Carlos Jobim, Jon Hendricks, Newton Mendonça)
3. "Smile" (Charlie Chaplin, Geoffrey Parsons, John Turner)
4. "Yes My Darling Daughter" (Albert Sirmay, Jack Lawrence)
5. "Ne Me Quitte Pas" (Jacques Brel)
6. "Every Time We Say Goodbye" (Cole Porter)
7. "The Way That I Remember Him" (Geoff Stephens)
8. "Hold 'im Down" (Chris Andrews)
9. "I Get a Kick Out of You" (Cole Porter)
10. "Time After Time" (Jule Styne, Sammy Cahn)
11. "That's Why" (Chris Andrews)
12. "By Myself" (Arthur Schwartz, Howard Dietz)

== Bonus tracks for CD reissue (Singles and B-Sides) ==
1. "Don't Need Anything" (Vance, Pockriss)
2. "Keep in Touch" (Chris Andrews)
3. "Puppet on a String" (Phil Coulter, Bill Martin)
4. "Tell The Boys" (Peter Callander, Mitch Murray)
5. "I Don't Think You Want Me Anymore" (Chris Andrews)
6. "No Moon" (Murphy, Mercier)
7. "Tonight In Tokyo" (Coulter, Martin)
8. "You've Been Seeing Her Again" (Chris Andrews)
9. "You've Not Changed" (Chris Andrews)
10. "Don't Make Me Cry" (Chris Andrews)
11. "Today" (Chris Andrews)
12. "London" (Chris Andrews)
13. "Don't Run Away" (Chris Andrews) mono
14. "Stop" (Chris Andrews)
15. "I'll Cry Myself To Sleep" (Roger Webb) mono
16. "Had A Dream Last Night" (Chris Andrews) mono
