= Nothing Less Than Brilliant (song) =

Single by Sandie Shaw

from the album Hello Angel
- B-side: "I Love Peace"
- Released: 1989
- Genre: Pop
- Label: Rough Trade
- Songwriter(s): Sandie Shaw, Chris Andrews
- Producer(s): Stephen Street

Sandie Shaw singles chronology
"Please Help the Cause Against Loneliness" (1988)	"Nothing Less Than Brilliant" (1989)

"Nothing Less Than Brilliant" is the final single by British singer Sandie Shaw, and the second single from her Hello Angel album.

Shaw initially became a star in the 1960s when she scored eight Top 10 singles in the UK alone, including three Number Ones (a first for a female), and became the first British act to win the Eurovision Song Contest. She had semi-retired from public life in the early 1970s, after being dropped from Pye Records in 1972 after issuing a series of non-charting singles. Although she had released a handful of non-charting singles from 1977 on, she made a proper comeback in 1984 when Morrissey and Johnny Marr of The Smiths persuaded her to cover their song "Hand in Glove", which became her first top 40 chart hit in 15 years. More singles followed and in 1988 she released the Hello Angel album.

"Nothing Less Than Brilliant" was remixed slightly and became the second and final single to be released from it. It was written by Shaw herself alongside Chris Andrews, who had written the vast majority of her 1960s hits. Shaw had lost confidence in herself due to bad experiences with the music industry in the past as well as the breakdown of her marriage to fashion designer Jeff Banks and subsequent bankruptcy, and one of the reasons for her comeback was the realisation that she still had fans out there, including people she had influenced musically (including The Smiths and Chrissie Hynde, with whom she had also become friends). The song described Shaw's portrayal of herself and others' portrayal of her. It later became the title of a 1994 compilation, and the single was re-issued as a result, and made number 66 on the UK Singles Chart.
