= Wight Is Wight =

1970 single by Sandie Shaw and Michel Delpech

Single by Michel Delpech
- B-side: "Wight Is Wight (instrumental)"
- Released: 1969
- Recorded: 1 October 1969
- Studio: Studio Davout, Paris, France
- Genre: Chanson française, pop
- Length: 3:00
- Label: Barclay
- Songwriters: Michel Delpech, Roland Vincent
- Producer: Yves Roze

Michel Delpech singles chronology
"Le Mauvais Jardinier" (1969)	"Wight Is Wight" (1969)	"Chère Lise" (1970)

"Wight Is Wight" is a French song by Michel Delpech. It sold over one million copies, and was awarded a gold disc. Released in 1969 it became a big hit in France and internationally. This hippy-influenced song was inspired by the first editions of the Isle of Wight Festival, mentioning Bob Dylan who played there in 1969. Donovan is also named in the chorus, even though he wouldn't appear at the festival before 1970, a few months after the song was released.

The title is a pun based on Los Bravos' 1966 hit single Black Is Black, covered by Johnny Hallyday in the same year, as "Noir c'est noir".

== Other versions ==
"Wight Is Wight"

Single by Sandie Shaw
- B-side: "That's The Way He's Made"
- Released: 1970
- Genre: Pop
- Label: Pye
- Songwriters: Michel Delpech, Roland Vincent, Sandie Shaw

Sandie Shaw singles chronology
"By Tomorrow" (1970)	"Wight Is Wight" (1970)	"Rose Garden" (1971)

The following year, it was recorded with lyrics in English by the British singer Sandie Shaw. It was released by Pye as her second single of the 1970s, with "That's the Way He's Made" as a B-side, written by Chris Andrews.

The same year, the italian group Dik Dik had made a version in Italian language, with the lyrics of Claudio Daiano and Alberto Salerno, which was released as "L'isola di Wight".

It was also recorded in 1970 by the Belgian singer John Terra in Flemish.

In 1971 the Uruguayan pop group Los Campos record a version in Spanish, titled "Isla de Wight", and include it in their album "Mi Reino Bajo el Sol".

== Track listing ==
1. "Wight Is Wight" (Delpech, Vincent) – 3:00
2. "Wight Is Wight (instrumental)" (Delpech, Vincent) – 3:00

== Chart performance ==
Chart (1969–1970)	Peak position
Argentina	5
France (IFOP)	1
Belgium (Ultratop 50 Singles (Flemish chart))	14
Belgium (Ultratop 50 Singles (Walloon chart))	2
