= Me (Sandie Shaw album) =

Studio album by Sandie Shaw
- Released: November 1965
- Genre: Pop
- Label: Pye
- Producer: Chris Andrews

Sandie Shaw chronology
Sandie (1965)	Me (1965)	The Golden Hits of Sandie Shaw (1966)

Professional ratings
Review scores
Source	Rating
Record Mirror	4/5 stars

Me is the second studio album by the British girl singer Sandie Shaw. It was released by Pye Records in November 1965, eight months after her debut, but was not as commercially successful - although her singles were still selling well. Since the release of the Sandie album, Shaw had gained another three UK Top 10 hits - "I'll Stop at Nothing," the number one "Long Live Love" and "Message Understood," all of which had been written by Chris Andrews. As with the previous album, Me contained a mixture of Andrews-penned material and cover versions of songs by other artists, as well as a track written by Shaw herself. However the balance of original and remade material was different this time - half of the twelve tracks were written by Andrews, as opposed to the third on Sandie, one track by Shaw, and five songs by other artists. Me was later re-issued as a package with Sandie on CD in the 1990s on the RPM label, and then again in digitally remastered format by EMI in 2005 with bonus French versions of "Down Dismal Ways" and "Too Bad You Don't Want Me".

AllMusic noted that "Shaw's second album was a substantial improvement on her debut in every respect, though hardly a major effort. It helped that Chris Andrews (who wrote most of her hits) supplied a lot of the tunes. and Shaw herself contributed a fair effort with her first original composition, "Till the Night Begins to Die".

== Track listing ==
All tracks composed by Chris Andrews, except where indicated:

Side 1

1. "You Don't Love Me No More" (Charles Blackwell)
2. "I Don't Need That Kind of Lovin'"
3. "Down Dismal Ways"
4. "Oh No He Don't"
5. "When I Was a Child" (Floyd Huddleston, Mark McIntyre)
6. "Do You Mind" (Lionel Bart)

Side 2

1. "(You Don't Know) How Glad I Am" (Jimmy Williams, Larry Harrison)
2. "I Know"
3. "Till The Night Begins To Die" (Sandie Shaw)
4. "Too Bad You Don't Want Me"
5. "One Day"
6. "When I Fall in Love" (Edward Heyman, Victor Young)

== Personnel ==
- Ken Woodman - arranger, conductor
- Bill Street - engineer
- Michael Williams - photography
