= Michel Delpech =

French singer and actor

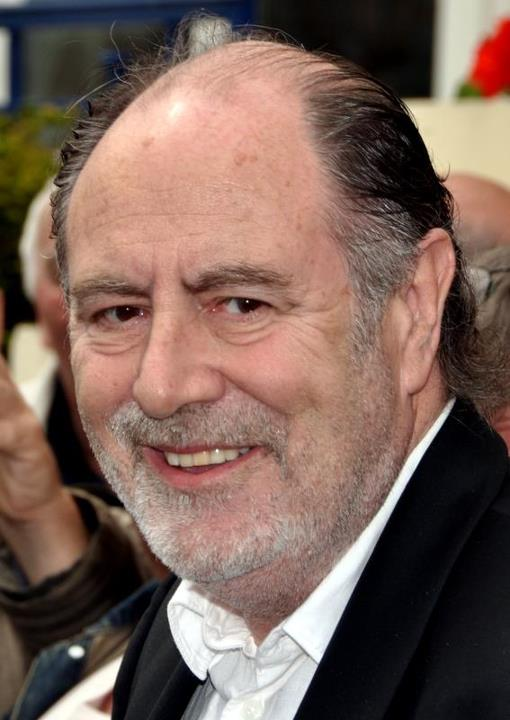
- Michel Delpech in 2012

Background information
- Born: Jean-Michel Delpech; 26 January 1946; Courbevoie, France
- Died: 2 January 2016 (aged 69) Puteaux, France
- Genre: Pop
- Occupations: Singer, songwriter, actor
- Instrument: Vocals
- Years active: 1964–2015
- Labels: Vogue, Disques Festival, Barclay, Tréma, Disques AZ, Universal, Discovery, Arcade, Polydor, Polygram, Magic, Laserlight
- Website: micheldelpech.artistes.universalmusic.fr

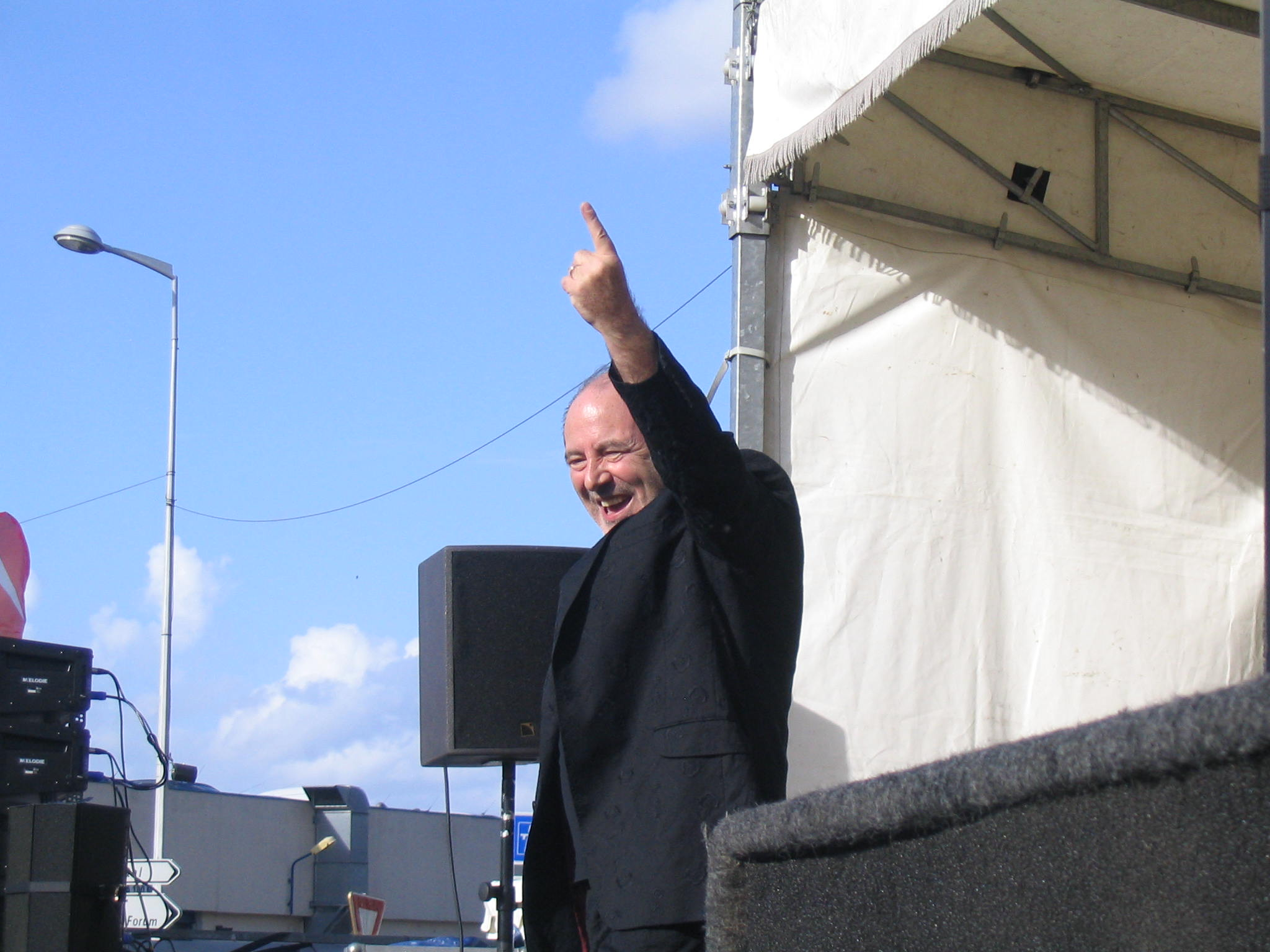
Michel Delpech in concert at Louviers in October 2006

Jean-Michel Delpech (French pronunciation: [ʒɑ̃ miʃɛl dɛlpɛʃ]; 26 January 1946 – 2 January 2016), known as Michel Delpech, was a French singer-songwriter and actor.

== Family ==
Jean-Michel Bertrand Delpech was born 26 January in 1946 in Courbevoie, a city located in the Parisian suburbs. Part of the baby boom, he was the son of Bertrand Charles Delpech, a chrome metal plater and Christiane Cécile Marie Josselin, a housewife. He had two younger sisters named Catherine and Martine.

His maternal family (Josselin) are winegrowers in Gyé-sur-Seine in the Aube department. His father's ancestral home is in Sologne, more specifically in Dhuizon, where his hairdresser grandfather lived and also in La Ferté-Saint-Cyr, where his uncles and cousins worked as grocers, loggers and farmers. The young Michel spent weekends and holidays with his provincial family, sometimes working in his aunt’s grocery store.

== Career debuts ==
His parents having moved to Cormeilles-en-Parisis in Seine-et-Oise (today known as Val-d’Oise), Jean-Michel Delpech studied at the Chabanne college and in the Pontoise’s Camille-Pissarro high school between 1961 and 1964.

As a teenager, he became passionate about famous classic singers like Luis Mariano, and then great names from the 1950s like Gilbert Bécaud and Charles Aznavour. In 1963, while in high school, he created a little orchestra with his schoolmates.

Before taking his final exams, he left high school in January 1964 to focus on singing. He took a chance by attending an audition in Paris to join the disque Vogue record company. At age 18, he released his first record called Anatole, and met composer Roland Vincent. While going to Roland’s house based in Saint-Cloud for a working session, he rethinks about his high school years and about the café he used to go with his mates after the school day. On the train, between Saint Lazare and Saint Cloud train station, he writes the lyrics of Chez Laurette, for which Roland Vincent felt seduced and inspired and quickly found a melody. Released 1 May 1965, during the yé yé period, this nostalgic teenager music wasn't a success at its release, but thanks to the numerous radio streams, he started to experience a slight celebrity.

In 1965, Michel Delpech attended a musical comedy Copains-Clopant, which was featured for 6 months, before at the Michodière theater and then at the Gymnase Theater in Paris: the integration of the Chez Laurette Music helped him to be famous. During this musical comedy, Delpech meets Chantal Simon, who he sang a song with. He would then marry her in 1966, at the age of 20.

The same year, under the Festival Label, he recorded its 2nd 45 laps : Inventaire 1966, new stepping stone towards the star status. As Jacques Prévert and as a tribute to the poetry, he compiles in the verse of the music, a list of news such as the Vietnam War, the miniskirt, the Courrèges boots, the Cacharel trend, the flower shirts, etc. Still in 1966, he made the first part during 38 shows of Jacques Brel who said goodbye to the Olympia.

== Success ==
In 1967, Johnny Stark, Mireille Mathieu’s manager takes Michel Delpech in charge and helps him to build up his star image. As the opener of "La chanteuse d’Avignon", he starts an international tour from West Germany, to USSR and United States. Same year, he quits the Festival Record Company and moves to the company Barclay.

In 1968, he receives the Grand prix of the French song award, for his song "Il y a des jours où on ferait mieux de rester au lit", (there are some days where you’d better stay in bed) written with Jean Jacques Debout.

During this period, he released several commercially successful singles, including Wight Is Wight (November 1969), Et Paul chantait yesterday, and Pour un flirt (May 1971). Wight Is Wight sold more than one million copies in Europe.

The very romantic Pour un flirt is a hit in French speaking countries, and in the Netherlands. His German version is hitting the charts in West Germany, Austria, and Switzerland. In just 4 months, more than 4 millions units are being sold. The singer himself is surprised: "I didn’t expect the verses to have so much potential", he said.

In 1970, the singer leaves his manager Johnny Stark to benefit a much wider artistic liberty, and 2 years later, stops his collaboration with Rolland Vincent looking for other writers.

Michel Delpech in 1974

In 1973, Chantal Simon left Delpech and his co-writer Jean Michel Rivat broke up with Christine Haas. This inspired him to write the song Les Divorcés, where he sings about acting like a breakup is peaceful, when it’s actually really painful. As this songs contrasts with the usual breezy and happy tone of previous Michel Delpech songs, the Barclay company was afraid this song would have a negative impact on how people perceived the singer, and they were very hesitant to release the song. However, when they finally agreed to release the song, it was a success with more than 100 thousand sales. The impact of the lyrics on society was so big that the uncontested divorce law would be adopted 3 years later.

From 1973 on, Delpech had success after success, releasing Que Marianne était jolie, Le Chasseur (1974), and Quand j'étais chanteur (1975).

In 1977, he sang Le Loir-et-Cher, a song that speaks with tenderness and irony about Loire et Cher inhabitants, where Delpech was born. "On dirait que ça te gêne de marcher dans la boue, on dirait que ca te gêne de dîner avec nous" (Looks like you don’t want to walk in the mud, looks like you don’t want to have dinner with us) is an illustration of the sometimes difficult relationship between cities and country sides.

== Career ==
He was born in Courbevoie, France. In 1963, Delpech released his debut hit "Anatole" on Disques Vogue. In 1964, Delpech met Roland Vincent, and a long singing songwriting partnership ensued, with Delpech being signed to Festival French record label.

In 1965, he took part in the music comedy Copains Clopant that had a six-month run and made him popular, particularly through his interpretation of "Chez Laurette". He was the opening act for Jacques Brel's goodbye concert at the Paris Olympia. In 1967, he collaborated with Johnny Stark. In 1968, he won the "Grand Prix du Disque" award for "Il y a des jours où on ferait mieux de rester au lit".

Then he left Vogue to sign with Barclay Records. At the peak of his success, he recorded "Wight Is Wight" in tribute to the Isle of Wight Festival, a famous rock festival on the Isle of Wight, which became his best known song. It sold over one million copies in Europe, and was awarded gold disc status.

'Pour un Flirt' was a second smash hit. It charted in the French-speaking countries around the globe as well in the Netherlands, and a version in German brought him charts success in West Germany, Austria and Switzerland. An English translation, Flirt, made the Top 20 in the UK.

The early 1970s brought a separation from Johnny Stark for two years, and the end of the long collaboration with Roland Vincent, his first-ever writer. He had some new releases but with limited success. In the 1980s, he enjoyed a comeback and released the album Loin d'ici. A compilation album followed in 1989. He continued releasing albums and playing concerts. In December 2006, he released an album of duets Michel Delpech and that topped the French Albums Chart for one week (week of 21–27 January 2007). During this time, he also engaged on a tour of France.

== Personal life ==
- In 1966, he met Chantal Simon whom he married. Later on the couple divorced, and Delpech suffered from depression. He searched for relief in religions, mainly Buddhism and later the Catholic faith.
- In the 1970s, there were also many rumours about attempted suicides, but he denied these rumours in a later biography.
- In 1983, he met Geneviève Garnier-Fabre, a French artist and they married in 1985.
- In 1990, he had a son, Emmanuel. He became a talented guitarist and joined his father in his concerts since 2007.
- In 2007, Pascal Louvrier wrote a biography about him titled Michel Delpech - Mis à Nu published on Editions Perrin.
- In 2011, he played the role of Françoit Gouriot in Beloved (French title: Les Bien-aimés)
- In 2011, he was a guest of honor for the sixth season of Âge tendre et Têtes de bois broadcast in France, Belgium and Switzerland.

=== Death ===
Delpech had long been a heavy smoker, going through a pack of cigarettes daily starting at the age of 18 and quitting only after being diagnosed with throat cancer in 2013. He died at a hospital in Puteaux, France on 2 January 2016 at the age of 69.

== Discography ==
=== Albums ===
Year	Title
1966	Inventaire 66
1969	Il y a des jours où on ferait mieux de rester au lit
1970	Album
1974	Le chasseur
1975	Quand j'étais chanteur
1979	5000 kilomètres
1986	Oubliez tout ce que je vous ai dit
1991	Les Voix du Brésil
1997	Le roi de rien
1999	Cadeau de Noël
2004	Comme Vous
2006	Michel Delpech &
2009	Sexa

Compilations

Year	Title
1990	J'étais un ange
1999	Fan de toi (2 CDs)
2008	Fan de toi (3 CDs)
2008	Les 100 plus belles chansons
2009	Best of

Live albums

Year	Title
1990	J'étais un ange
1999	Fan de toi (2 CDs)
2008	Fan de toi (3 CDs)
2008	Les 100 plus belles chansons
2009	Best of

=== Singles ===
Disques Vogue

Year	Title
1964	Anatole
1965	Chez Laurette

Festival

Year	Title
1964	Elle se moque de toi
1965	Copains Clopants (with Chantal Simon)
1965	Chez Laurette
1965	T'en fais pas
1965	Plus d'bac
1966	Marie-toi Marie Jo
1966	Inventaire 66
1966	Quand on aime comme on s'aime
1966	Le restaurant chinois
1967	La Femme de l'an 3000

Barclay

Year	Title
1967	Il faut regarder les étoiles
1967	Pour un coin de Pologne
1968	Poupée cassée
1968	Les p'tits cailloux blancs
1969	Le Mauvais Jardinier
1969	Wight Is Wight
1969	Quand la pluie tombe en été
1970	Chérie-Lise
1970	Un coup de pied dans la montagne
1971	Le blé en herbe
1971	La Vie, La Vie
1971	Pour un flirt
1972	Quand un soldat reviens
1972	Même pendant la guerre on chante
1972	Fan de toi
1972	Que Marianne était jolie
1973	Rimbaud chanterait
1973	Les aveux
1973	Je pense à toi
1974	Je l'attendais
1974	Le chasseur (Les oies sauvages)
1975	Quand j’étais chanteur
1976	Ce lundi-là
1976	Tu me fais planer
1976	La fille avec des baskets
1977	Fais un bébé
1977	Le Loir et Cher
1978	C’est ta chanson" (remake of "Your Song")
1979	Trente manières de quitter une fille" (remake of "50 Ways To Leave Your Lover")
1979	Je cherche un endroit
1980	Docker
1981	Bombay
1983	Animaux animaux
1984	Loin

Pathé-Marconi / EMI / Charles Talar Records

Year	Title
1985	"Rock en U.R.S.S."
1986	"J'peux pas dormir"
1986	"Oubliez tout ce que je vous ai dit"
1987	"Petite France"
1988	"Ces mots-là"

Carrèr

Year	Title
1988	Fais glisser tes bas... ces mots-là

Tréma

Year	Title
1989	Pleurer le chanteur
1990	J'étais un ange
1991	Les voix du Brésil
1992	Terre d'amour
