= Sandie (album) =

Studio album by Sandie Shaw
- Released: February 1965
- Studio: Pye (London, UK)
- Genre: Pop
- Length: 32:20
- Label: Pye
- Producer: Ken Woodman

Sandie Shaw chronology
Sandie (1965)	Me (1965)

Professional ratings
Review scores
Source	Rating
Record Mirror	4/5 stars

Sandie is the debut studio album by the English pop singer Sandie Shaw. Released in February 1965 on the Pye label, it was her only original album to enter the UK Albums Chart (most of Shaw's success was through her singles) and peaked at Number 3. In the few months prior to the album's release, Shaw had scored two major hits with the Bacharach/David-penned "(There's) Always Something There to Remind Me" and Chris Andrews's "Girl Don't Come"; although neither track was included on this album.

Andrews, who had been signed to Shaw as her main songwriter, contributed four new songs to her debut album. These tracks were later released on an EP entitled "Talk About Love." The other eight tracks on the Sandie album were reworkings of songs made popular by other artists. Sandie was eventually released on the CD format on the RPM label in the 1990s as a double package with her second album, Me, and this package was later released in digitally remastered format by EMI in September 2005 with bonus French-language versions of two of the Chris Andrews tracks.

In a retrospective review, AllMusic noted that despite its chart success, "From every standpoint, it betrayed hasty execution – wafer-thin production, shoddy original material (none of her early singles are included), lousy covers of American and British pop and rock hits, and one-dimensional vocalizing and interpretive skills from Sandie herself."

== Track listing ==
1. "Everybody Loves a Lover" (Richard Adler, Richard Allen) - 2:42
2. "Gotta See My Baby Every Day" (Chris Andrews) - 2:59
3. "Love Letters" (Victor Young) - 2:16
4. "Stop Feeling Sorry for Yourself" (Chris Andrews) - 3:16
5. "Always" (Irving Berlin) - 2:26
6. "Don't Be That Way" (Chris Andrews) - 2:02
7. "It's In His Kiss" (Rudy Clark) - 2:03
8. "Downtown" (Tony Hatch) - 2:51
9. "You Won't Forget Me" (Jackie DeShannon, Sharon Sheeley) - 2:34
10. "Lemon Tree" (Will Holt) - 3:46
11. "Baby I Need Your Loving" (Holland-Dozier-Holland) - 2:28
12. "Talk About Love" (Chris Andrews) - 2:07
