= Hello Angel =

Studio album by Sandie Shaw
- Released: 24 October 1988
- Studios: Master Rock Studios, Kilburn, London; Beethoven Street Studios, Notting Hill, London; The Point Studios, Belgravia, London; Westside Studios, Holland Park, London; Matrix Studios, Little Russell Street, London
- Genres: Pop, alternative rock
- Label: Rough Trade
- Producers: Stephen Street, Kevin Armstrong, Clive Langer, Alan Winstanley, Peter Jones, John Porter

Sandie Shaw chronology
Choose Life (1983)	Hello Angel (1988)	Nothing Less Than Brilliant (1994)

Hello Angel is the seventh and final studio album by British singer Sandie Shaw, released in 1988.

== Album background ==
Shaw had released a couple of singles in the late 1970s on the CBS label, but did not show a serious interest in making additional material until the early 1980s, when new husband Nik Powell (co-founder of the Virgin Group) introduced her to the B.E.F. (British Electric Foundation).

Shaw recorded an updated version of the Burt Bacharach/Hal David classic "Anyone Who Had a Heart" for their Music of Quality and Distinction album, which was subsequently released as a single. Shaw learned that her earlier work had influenced musicians like Chrissie Hynde of the Pretenders, and she was invited to join Hynde on stage during a Pretenders concert to perform one of their songs with them. She and Hynde also sang a duet of Shaw's Top 3 hit from 1964, "Girl Don't Come". An album was discussed with Virgin Records, who had released the B.E.F.'s album, but Shaw became pregnant with her daughter Amie and delayed the project.

In 1983, Shaw wrote and recorded a new original album entitled Choose Life, 1,000 promotional copies of which were released in support of the World Peace Exposition. However demand by fans led to the album being officially released on the Palace label. Around this time, Shaw received a letter signed "Two incurable Sandie Shaw fans" telling her that "The Sandie Shaw legacy is not over yet – there is more to be done." It was in fact from Steven Morrissey and Johnny Marr of The Smiths. They also informed her that they had written a song that they would be delighted if she would record. Though wary at first, Shaw agreed to meet Morrissey and continued to receive letters from him via Geoff Travis of Rough Trade Records (the label to which the band was signed), a personal friend of Powell's.

Shaw eventually recorded the song, "I Don't Owe You Anything" as well as versions of other Smiths songs, including "Hand in Glove," which had been their first single. Shaw's version of the song was subsequently released as a single, and reached the Top 30 in the UK Singles Chart. It was accompanied by a performance on Top Of The Pops, which involved Shaw writhing on the floor kicking her feet in the air backed by The Smiths all in bare feet (as a tribute to her quirk of performing barefoot during the 1960s). An album with Rough Trade was discussed, but the project was put on hold when Shaw became pregnant.

Two years later Shaw was signed to Polydor Records and released two singles with them. She also embarked on her first University tour in over twenty years. Again an album was discussed, but was cancelled due to a change in management and the feeling that the two singles had not done well enough for an album to be made. In the end, Shaw secured a deal with Rough Trade to make the Hello Angel album (the title of which was inspired by a postcard from Morrissey), and it was released in 1988.

== Personnel ==
Everyone involved with the album was either a personal friend or supporter of Shaw's. She was determined to make it her own personal album, unlike the ones she had made two decades previously. Seven of the eleven tracks were co-written by Shaw herself, four of which alongside Chris Andrews, who had written the vast majority of her 1960s hit singles. Morrissey and Stephen Street provided the song "Please Help the Cause Against Loneliness" which would become the first single to be released from the album. Street was also given production credits for most of the songs.

Writing credits were also given to Jim and William Reid of The Jesus and Mary Chain on the song "Cool About You." Guitarist Kevin Armstrong was credited on every track with the exception of the now two-year-old "Hand in Glove" which credited Johnny Marr as guitarist and the rest of The Smiths as musicians. Armstrong also co-wrote two tracks with Shaw and was given production credits on one track. Writer/producer Clive Langer was also given credits on the song "Comrade in Arms."

== Overview ==
The opening track is called "Nothing Less Than Brilliant" and is written by Shaw and Andrews. Shaw had lost confidence in herself after her initial fame and had spent much of the 1970s poor after her divorce from bankrupt fashion designer Jeff Banks. As mentioned previously, Shaw later came to realise that she had influenced other people, and this song talks about her perception of herself and how she was seen by others in a more positive light. "Nothing Less Than Brilliant" became the second and final single to be released from the album, and later became the title of a 1994 compilation album. Song number two, the title track, is another Shaw/Andrews track. Andrews had originally written the music for Morrissey to put lyrics to, but Shaw ended up doing them herself instead. "Take Him", also by Shaw and Andrews, is a tongue-in-cheek rumba/cha-cha-inspired song rumoured to be based on a true incident with Morrissey.

"A Girl Called Johnny" is the first of two cover versions on the album, and was originally recorded by The Waterboys. Mike Scott had originally written the song about American singer Patti Smith. "Strange Bedfellows", by Shaw and Kevin Armstrong is one of the more eccentric tracks on the album, telling the story of a married couple engaged in some sort of gender-swapping role-play. "Please Help the Cause Against Loneliness" was written by Morrissey and Stephen Street for Morrissey's first solo album. A demo was recorded though it did not end up on the final product. It was instead given to Shaw who took to the song straight away, and it became the first single to be released from the album.

Side two of the album begins with a new mix of Shaw's original Rough Trade hit "Hand in Glove", which had originally been The Smiths' first single. Stephen Street is credited as remixing the track. "Cool About You" is a Phil Spector-influenced song written by Jim and Willian Reid of The Jesus and Mary Chain. Several effects used here are reminiscent of the wall of sound, such as plucked strings sounding like raindrops. "Flesh and Blood" is the other track on which Kevin Armstrong is credited as writing alongside Shaw. "Comrade In Arms" is possibly the most significant song on the album. Written by Shaw and Clive Langer, it tells of the relationship Shaw had with a close friend who was dying of AIDS. She finished writing the lyrics on the day he died, and it was recorded in the studio in the middle of the night with some friends present. "I Will Remain" is the final track on the album, and once again Shaw and Andrews are given writing credits.

== Track listing ==
No.	Title	Writer(s)	Length
1.	"Nothing Less Than Brilliant"	lyrics: Sandie Shaw; music: Chris Andrews	3:31
2.	"Hello Angel"	lyrics: Sandie Shaw; music: Chris Andrews	3:20
3.	"Take Him"	lyrics: Sandie Shaw; music: Chris Andrews	4:18
4.	"A Girl Called Johnny"	Mike Scott	4:08
5.	"Strange Bedfellows"	lyrics: Sandie Shaw; music: Kevin Armstrong	2:48
6.	"Please Help the Cause Against Loneliness"	lyrics: Morrissey; music: Stephen Street	2:09
7.	"Hand in Glove"	lyrics: Morrissey; music: Johnny Marr	2:51
8.	"Cool About You"	Jim Reid, William Reid	3:52
9.	"Flesh and Blood"	lyrics: Sandie Shaw; music: Kevin Armstrong, Sandie Shaw	4:30
10.	"Comrade in Arms"	lyrics: Sandie Shaw; music: Clive Langer	3:52
11.	"I Will Remain"	lyrics: Sandie Shaw; music: Chris Andrews	4:21

CD bonus tracks
No.	Title	Writer(s)	Length
12.	"Lover of the Century"	Mark E. Nevin, Sandie Shaw	5:13
13.	"Where Were You"	Chris Andrews, Sandie Shaw	3:36
14.	"I Love Peace"	Kevin Armstrong, Sandie Shaw	3:17
15.	"Jeane"	Johnny Marr, Morrissey	3:13
16.	"I Don't Owe You Anything"	Johnny Marr, Morrissey	4:07
17.	"Hand in Glove" (Original Single Version)	Johnny Marr, Morrissey	2:58

== Personnel ==
- Sandie Shaw - vocals
- Kevin Armstrong - guitar
- Danny Cummings - percussion
- James Eller - bass
- Deon Estus - bass
- Reeves Gabrels - guitar
- Chrissie Hynde - harmonica
- Johnny Marr - guitar on "Hand in Glove"
- Andy Rourke - bass on "Hand in Glove"
- Tim Sanders - soprano saxophone
- Neil Conti - drums
- Mike Joyce - drums on "Hand in Glove"
- Beryl Marsden - background vocals
- Andrew Paresi - drums
- Richard Coles - keyboards
- Maureen Gray - background vocals
- Janice Long - castanets
- Christoph M. Kaiser - bass
- J.P. Ajanonwu - background vocals
- Steve Nieve - keyboards
- Kick Horns - horns
- Louie Oberlander - keyboards
