= Wilhelm Gegenfurtner =

German Roman Catholic priest

Wilhelm Gegenfurtner is a German Roman Catholic priest.

He was born in Teisnach, Lower Bavaria, and in 1974 became a Roman Catholic priest in the Roman Catholic Diocese of Regensburg. His work as a priest was at Geisenfeld, at the University of Regensburg. He was awarded the Order of Merit of the Federal Republic of Germany in August 2005.
