= CPg =

Hungarian punk rock group

CPg is a controversial underground punk rock group formed by guitarist Zoltán Benkő and bassist Antal Kis in Szeged, Hungary, in 1979. Zoltán Nagy, vocalist Béla Haska and bassist Zoltán Varga joined in 1981. The group continues to perform today.

== History ==
CPg were a Hungarian punk rock act known for controversial stage antics, anti-establishment songs and lyrics openly condemning the socialist state authority of then Soviet-occupied Hungary. By 1982 many establishments closed their doors to the act and the band was forced to relocate to Budapest. CPg gained considerable underground popularity among fans, however, by then, the music industry and authorities were also on the lookout; band members had increasingly come under the scrutiny and frequent harassment of police.

Undeterred, the band continued to perform and compose. One song, in particular, had Hungarian state-owned recording industry top executive – and oft disliked – gatekeeper, Péter Erdős, become the subject of an obscene, but humorous signature anthem. Unamused, the record mogul attempted a campaign of slander going on record by falsely alleging the band represented extremist ideologies, advocating hatred towards Hungary's ethnic Roma minority; further propagating bogus claims the acronym, C.P.G. actually stood for Cigány Pusztitó Gárda. (Gypsy Extermination Guards) With further efforts to undermine the band, according to frontman Béla Haska, one incident even involved a private meeting with Erdős that quickly got exposed as a poor entrapment scheme involving the executive's failed attempt to secretly record incriminating conversations.

CPg's final show was performed on March 5, 1983. Singer, Béla Haska presented a chicken on stage, and fans quickly ripped it to pieces. Members of CPg were arrested on charges of political agitation. An investigation concluded that the band did not represent fascist ideologies, but in fact were anti-communists. The subsequent trial lasted for six months, involving numerous witnesses, and additional incriminating evidence in the form of confiscated audio tapes and journals to support the charge. In one instance prosecution even went as far as to present false evidence in the form of hateful, racist lyrics allegedly tied to the activities of CPg that had in fact been written and recorded by another musical group.

All four band members were convicted. Benkő, Haska and Nagy each received two-year jail sentences. Varga was placed on four year probation as a juvenile offender. Shortly after his release, Benkő fled to America in an act to avoid draft for compulsory military service. Having spent seven years in the States he finally returned to Hungary in 1993. The late 1990s saw the reunion of Cpg with all four original band members. During the communist era, the only documented source of CPg music was poor quality cassette bootleg recordings, however, in 1993 an official live CD was published by Trottel Records titled: Mindent Megeszünk. In 1999, producer Róbert Kövessy made a 63-minute documentary on the early days of Cpg, entitled Pol Pot Megye Punkjai (The Punks of Pol Pot County). In 2003 Auróra Records released CPg's first studio recording called "Embör vigyázz!" containing mostly songs that were written and performed 20 years prior.

== Name ==
Former band member, Antal Kis stated that the name of the band was directly influenced by the repeatedly sung phrase "Come on" taken from "Please Please Me" by The Beatles. Though not speaking English at the time they misspelled the word instead as "Common" thereby becoming Common Group. Shortly after deciding to pursue a punk rock direction the name was corrected to the official Come on Punk Group. Benkő later jokingly changed the name to Coitus Punk Group.

== Discography ==
- Demo (1983)
- Mindent Megeszünk (1993)
- 1980–1984 (2000)
- Embör Vigyázz! (2003)
- A38, 2005.XII.15. (2005)
- CPg 7"Bakelit (2006)

== Band members ==
- Zoltán "Güzü" Benkő – guitars
- Zoltán "Kutyás" Nagy – drums
- Béla Haska – vocals
- Zoltán "Takony" Varga – bass

=== Former members ===
- Antal "Kicsi" Kis – bass
- Tibor "Bőr" Kocsis – keyboards, vocals
- Ferenc "Boy" Gallai – vocals
- István "Főnök" Fátyol – vocals
