= Sandie Shaw =

British singer (born 1947)

Sandie Shaw MBE
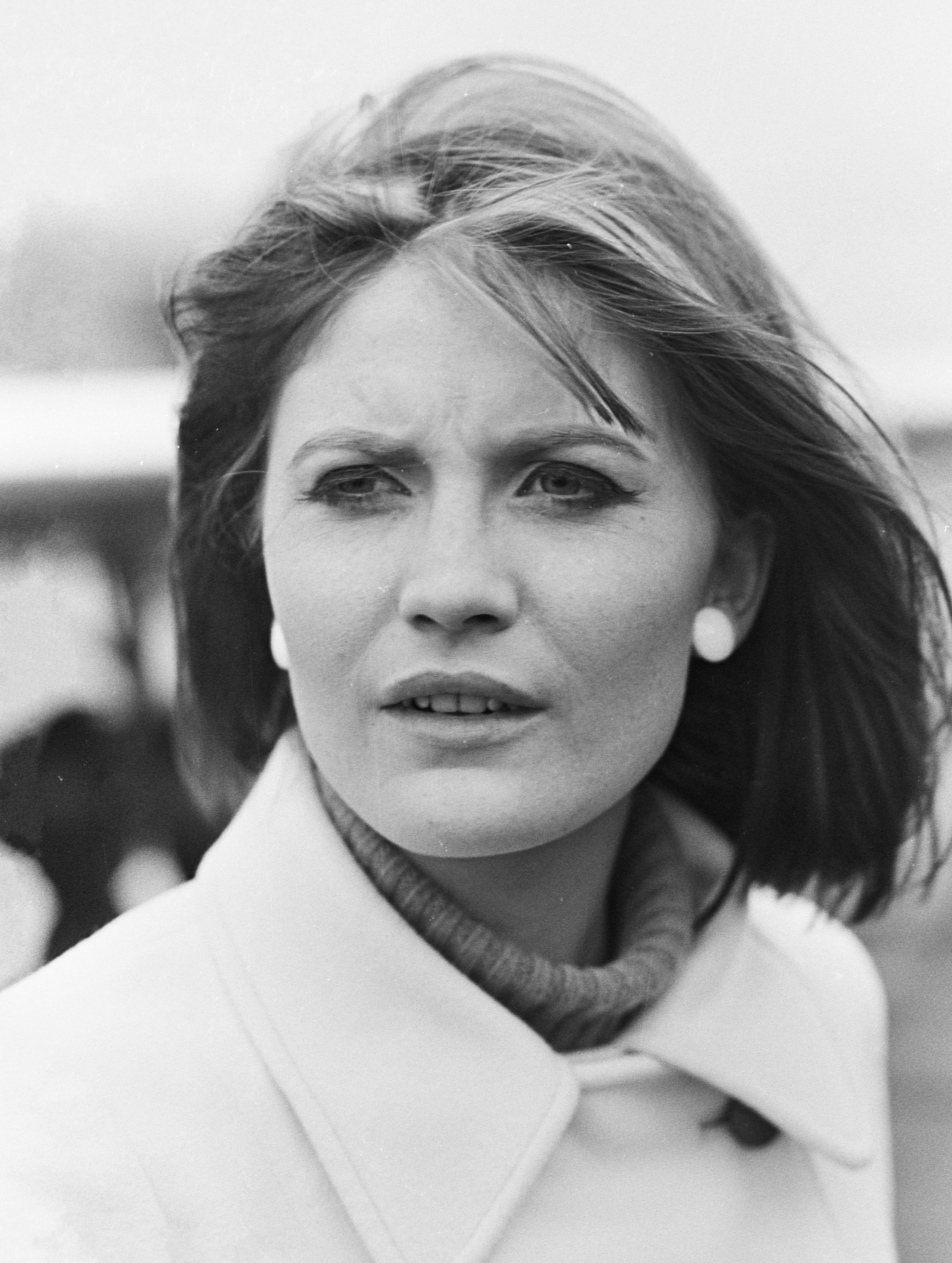
- Shaw in 1967

Background information
- Born: Sandra Ann Goodrich; 26 February 1947 (age 79); Dagenham, Essex, England
- Genre: Pop
- Occupation: Singer
- Years active: 1964–2013
- Labels: Pye; Reprise; Palace; Polydor; Virgin; EMI
- Website: sandieshaw.com

Sandra Ann Goodrich (born 26 February 1947), better known by her stage name Sandie Shaw, is an English retired pop singer. One of the most successful British female singers of the 1960s, she had three UK number one singles with "(There's) Always Something There to Remind Me" (1964), "Long Live Love" (1965) and "Puppet on a String" (1967). With the latter, she won the Eurovision Song Contest for the United Kingdom, becoming the first entrant from that country to win the contest. She was seen as epitomising the Swinging Sixties and was often described as "the barefoot pop princess of the 1960s". She returned to the UK Top 40, for the first time in 15 years, with her 1984 cover of the Smiths song "Hand in Glove". Shaw retired from the music industry in 2013.

== Biography ==
=== Early life and career ===
Sandra Ann Goodrich was born and brought up in Dagenham (at that time in Essex), England. She attended Robert Clack Technical School in Becontree Heath, Dagenham. On leaving school, she worked at the nearby Ford Dagenham factory and did some part-time modelling before coming second as a singer in a local talent contest. Her prize was for her to appear at a charity concert in London; there, her potential was spotted by singer Adam Faith. He introduced her to his manager, Eve Taylor, who won her a contract with Pye Records in 1964 and gave her the stage name of "Sandie Shaw".

Taylor teamed Shaw with songwriter Chris Andrews, who wrote her first single, "As Long as You're Happy Baby", which failed to make the charts. However, for her second single Taylor gave her the Bacharach and David song "(There's) Always Something There to Remind Me", which had been a No. 49 US pop hit for singer Lou Johnson. Shaw's version rose to No. 1 in the UK singles chart in the autumn of 1964, and also charted in the United States at No. 52 on the Billboard Hot 100 early the following year.

"I'd Be Far Better Off Without You" was issued as the follow-up, but DJs preferred its B-side, "Girl Don't Come", also written by Andrews, and the sides were switched. "Girl Don't Come" reached No. 3 in the UK and became her biggest US hit, reaching No. 42. It was followed by further hits in the UK including "I'll Stop at Nothing", "Long Live Love", her second UK No. 1 in 1965, and "Message Understood". The singles were produced by Taylor, Andrews and Shaw herself (though she was never credited), with help from Pye Records arranger Ken Woodman. Another potential follow-up, Les Reed and Gordon Mills's "It's Not Unusual", was originally written for Shaw but never recorded after the singer on the demo, a then-unknown Tom Jones, impressed Shaw so much with his powerful interpretation of the song that she encouraged Jones to release the song himself; it became Jones's breakout hit.

Shaw was a regular on popular British TV programmes of the time such as Top of the Pops, Ready Steady Go! and Thank Your Lucky Stars. She was seen as epitomising the "Swinging Sixties", and her trademark of performing barefoot endeared her to the public at large. She was often described as "the barefoot pop princess of the 1960s". She also recorded most of her hit singles in Italian, French, German and Spanish, boosting her popularity in Europe. Shaw also released several original albums in the 1960s: Sandie; Me (both 1965); Puppet on a String; Love Me, Please Love Me (both 1967); The Sandie Shaw Supplement (1968); and Reviewing the Situation (1969). These albums generally consisted of Andrews-penned songs mixed with cover versions of songs made popular by other musicians.

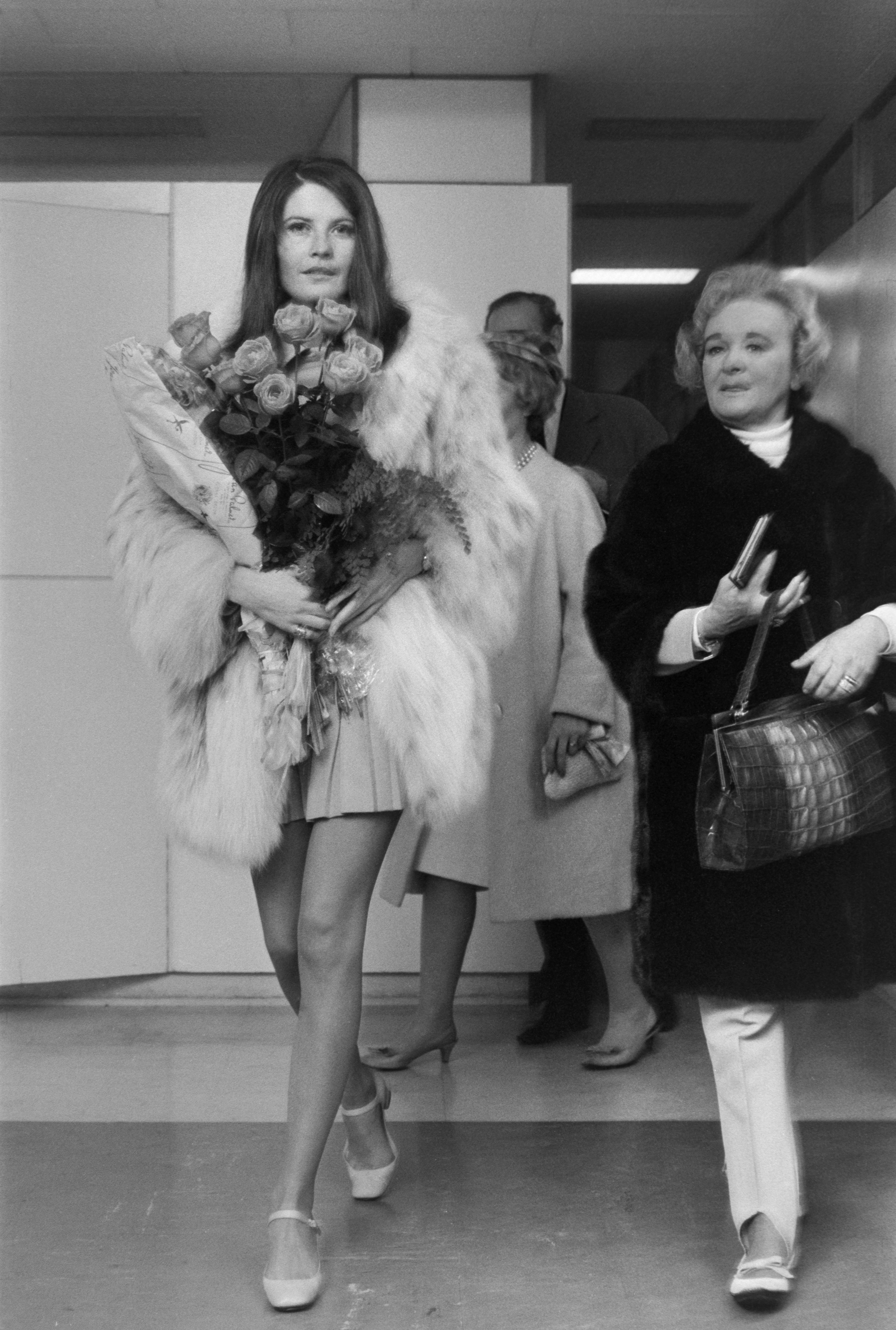
Sandie Shaw arrives in Finland in 1967 with her manager Eve Taylor

Shaw's record sales were declining by 1967, and her manager decided she should move more towards cabaret. She was invited by the BBC to represent the UK in the Eurovision Song Contest 1967 in Vienna. She had reservations, for she felt that taking part would destroy her credibility, but performed five songs on The Rolf Harris Show, with the public voting that the one that should represent the country was the Bill Martin/Phil Coulter composition "Puppet on a String". Although Shaw disliked the song and thought it was unrepresentative of her material, it won the contest by a near-record margin of votes, and made Shaw the first person to win the contest for the UK. It gave her a third UK No. 1 single, a record for a female at the time.

"Puppet on a String" also became an international hit (though not in the US) and the largest-selling single of the year in Germany, qualifying for a gold disc for attaining one million sales in the UK and Europe. Globally, the single achieved sales in excess of 4 million, making it the biggest selling winning Eurovision track to date. Some estimates suggest this makes the track the biggest selling single by a British female artist of all time. Her Eurovision success almost did not happen; the BBC wanted to drop her because she had been the "other woman" in a divorce case.

Fashion had become another of Shaw's trademarks, and in 1968 she began the Sandie Shaw fashion label, selling her own brand of clothing and shoes and jewellery. In the same year she hosted her own TV show, The Sandie Shaw Supplement, and issued an LP of the same title. Her last UK Top 10 hit (her eighth in total) came in the form of 1969's "Monsieur Dupont", originally sung by German artist Manuela with German lyrics.

At the end of 1969, the single "Heaven Knows I'm Missing Him Now" was released, which would become the inspiration for a hit by the Smiths 15 years later. Shaw also produced her own album, Reviewing the Situation, which contained versions of songs by artists such as Bob Dylan and the Rolling Stones and made Shaw the first known artist to cover a Led Zeppelin song. Shaw ended 1969 by appearing on the BBC's review of the 1960s' music scene Pop Go The Sixties, performing "There's Always Something There To Remind Me" and the German version of "Puppet on a String", "Wiedehopf Im Mai", live on the show broadcast on BBC1, 31 December 1969.

=== 1970 to present ===
Although she began writing songs, her contract with Pye expired in 1972. She retired from life as a pop singer and began working on other ventures, including co-writing a full-length rock musical, songwriting, acting in stage productions (she played Ophelia in Hamlet and Joan of Arc in Saint Joan) and writing children's books. In 1972 she further demonstrated her versatility as an artist appearing on BBC Television's long-running music hall programme, The Good Old Days. In 1973, Shaw was one of eight artists each given their own TV special in the BBC1 series Music My Way, where her guests included Blue Mink. By her own choice, Shaw left the music business and took work in a central London restaurant as a waitress, but in 1977, she released two singles on the CBS label and the following year began a lifelong commitment to Sōka Gakkai Buddhism.

Her second husband, Nik Powell, introduced her to BEF. She recorded a version of "Anyone Who Had a Heart" for their Music of Quality And Distinction album on the Virgin label, which brought her back into the public eye. Chrissie Hynde of the Pretenders invited Shaw to perform a duet rendition of "Girl Don't Come" at a Pretenders performance, and the two women began a long-term friendship. The following year Shaw wrote and recorded an album, Choose Life, to publicise the World Peace Exposition in London in March 1983. Later in the year, a new phase in her career began after she received a letter from "two incurable Sandie Shaw fans" – singer Morrissey and lead guitarist Johnny Marr of the Smiths – telling her that "The Sandie Shaw legend cannot be over yet – there is more to be done." Shaw's husband was a friend of Geoff Travis of Rough Trade Records, the label to which the Smiths were signed, and she agreed to record some of their songs.

In April 1984, her version of "Hand in Glove" (the Smiths' first single) was released and peaked just inside the UK Top 30. She recorded a new version of her first hit "(There's) Always Something There to Remind Me" for the film Letter to Brezhnev and then released two singles on the Polydor label. 1986 saw her embark on her first university tour in almost 20 years with a band made up largely of members of the JoBoxers, followed in 1988 by the album Hello Angel, the name inspired by a postcard from Morrissey. Shaw embarked on two more successful university tours and made appearances at Gay pride and Peace festivals.

Sandie Shaw appeared at the Sanremo Music Festival 1990, singing "Deep Joy", the English version to Milva's song "Sono Felice". The 1990s saw the release of many compilation albums of Shaw's material on various minor labels, as well as reissues of some of her original albums. Shaw's autobiography, The World at My Feet, was published in 1991, and the following year she began studying at Oxford and the University of London and qualified as a psychotherapist in 1994. During that time, she recorded new versions of some of her 1960s songs for the album Nothing Less Than Brilliant, released in 1994. It was also around this time that Shaw divorced Powell and met her third husband, Tony Bedford. Concentrating on a new career as a psychotherapist, Shaw opened the Arts Clinic in 1997 with her husband, to provide psychological healthcare and creative development to those in the creative industries. The clinic is now styled Barefoot Therapy: The Arts Clinic and continues to provide psychological support for those in the fields of entertainment, media and sports. In 1998 she was invited to join the Royal Society of Musicians as an Honorary Professor of Music.

Shaw also embarked on a successful legal battle to establish ownership of her entire recording catalogue and began working with contemporary acts and producers, reworking much of her 1960s and 1980s material. In 2003, Shaw licensed her recording catalogue worldwide to EMI, continued to develop her Arts Clinic and began executive coaching and mentoring. Meanwhile, EMI released compilations of her French and Italian recordings, and the following year released similar compilations in Spanish and German. Newly remastered versions of Reviewing the Situation and Hello Angel also were issued with bonus tracks, and toward the end of the year a 4-CD box set entitled Nothing Comes Easy was released. Also in 2003, actress Ashley Williams portrayed Shaw on an episode of the American television series American Dreams, performing "(There's) Always Something There to Remind Me" on American Bandstand.

During this decade, she reneged on previous declarations of hatred for the Eurovision Song Contest and announced that she was proud of her Eurovision past on the BBC show Making Your Mind Up. She also briefly sat in for Brian Matthew on his long-running BBC Radio 2 Saturday morning show Sounds of the 60s in December 2006. On 26 February 2007, in honour of her 60th birthday, Shaw released a new version of "Puppet on a String" on her website. The re-tooled version, called "Puppet's Got a Brand New String", had a complete overhaul in sound and vocals under the supervision of her friend Howard Jones and mixer Andy Gray. The schlager style of the song was replaced with a calmer melody.

In April 2010, Shaw appeared on the UK ITV television programme Loose Women and stated that she was returning to recording and would be singing the theme song to the British film, Made in Dagenham. She also took the opportunity to criticise the Eurovision Song Contest, saying that it was bad when she did it, but had now got even worse.

In August 2010, she appeared at Vintage, a festival on the Goodwood estate in West Sussex, as a special guest of Wayne Hemingway (Red or Dead) who organised the event. As well as hosting her own main stage set, with numerous female guest singers, she also performed cameos on other stages, including singing "Downtown" with composer Tony Hatch and an orchestra in the cabaret tent.

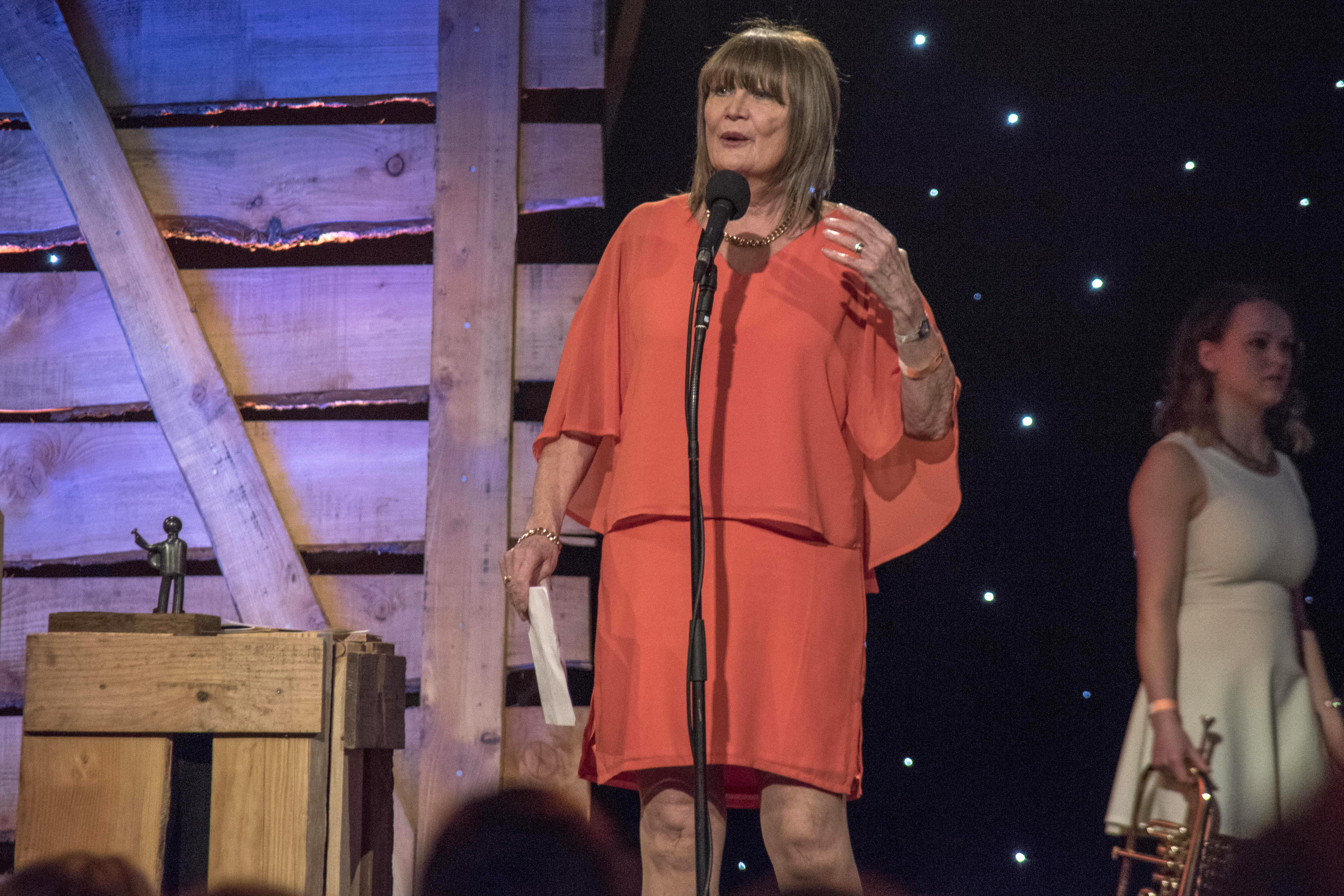
Shaw in 2016

On Boxing Day 2010, she appeared on BBC Radio 4's Desert Island Discs. Her choices included "Remember (Walking in the Sand)" by the Shangri-Las, "Barefootin'" by Georgie Fame and "Here Comes the Sun by the Beatles.

She was Jools Holland's special guest on his 2011 Tour. On New Year's Eve in 2011 Shaw performed on BBC Two's Hootenanny backed by Jools Holland's Rhythm and Blues Orchestra.

In August 2012 she was a guest, alongside singers Petula Clark, Helen Shapiro and Jackie Trent, and producer and manager Vicki Wickham, on the BBC Radio 4 programme The Reunion.

Shaw was appointed Member of the Order of the British Empire (MBE) in the 2017 Birthday Honours for services to music.

== Personal life ==
On 6 March 1968, Shaw married fashion designer Jeff Banks at the Greenwich Register Office in London. Their daughter Gracie was born in February 1971. The marriage to Banks ended in 1978. In 1982, she married Nik Powell, co-founder of the Virgin Group and chairman of the European Film Academy. They had two children together before divorcing in 1995. She then married her third husband, the psychologist Tony Bedford.

In August 2007, Shaw said that she had undergone corrective surgery on her feet, which she described as "ugly"; the surgery meant she was unable to walk until October of that year.

In 2013 Shaw was hospitalised and suffered severe head injuries after a car crash.

In a Daily Telegraph interview in 2013, Shaw said that in her sixties she had taken up nudism on holiday with her third husband in the Caribbean.

Shaw has campaigned for musicians' rights and has stated that finance is a barrier for emerging artists. In 2013 she criticised the music industry for being dominated by manufactured artists from shows such as The X Factor, stating: "All we're getting is a load of Simon Cowell–type stuff. The artists are just mere puppets."

=== Political views ===
In April 2012, Shaw joined an Amnesty International campaign to end human rights abuses in Azerbaijan, host country of the Eurovision Song Contest 2012, after the journalist Khadija Ismayilova was blackmailed and sex taped. Shaw stated: "That anyone would stoop so low in an attempt to silence an independent journalist is sickening. The people behind this appalling blackmail and smear campaign must be brought to justice. And the persecution of independent journalists in Azerbaijan must stop."

In August 2014, in the lead-up to the Scottish independence referendum that was to take place in September that year, Shaw was one of 200 public figures who were signatories to a letter to The Guardian expressing their hope that Scotland would vote to remain part of the United Kingdom.

In April 2016 she spoke out in opposition to the campaign for Britain to leave the European Union, calling it "retrogressive" and warned of a risk of dividing Europe.

== Discography ==
- Sandie (1965)
- Me (1965)
- Love Me, Please Love Me (1967)
- The Sandie Shaw Supplement (1968)
- Reviewing the Situation (1969)
- Choose Life (1983)
- Hello Angel (1988)

== See also ==
- List of barefooters
- List of artists who reached number one on the UK Singles Chart
- List of Peel sessions
- List of artists who reached number one in Ireland
- List of performers on Top of the Pops

Awards and achievements
| Preceded by (Austria) Udo Jürgens with "Merci, Chérie" | Winner of the Eurovision Song Contest; 1967 | Succeeded by (Spain) Massiel with "La, la, la" |
| Preceded by Kenneth McKellar with "A Man Without Love" | United Kingdom in the Eurovision Song Contest; 1967 | Succeeded by Cliff Richard with "Congratulations" |
