= The Very Best of Sandie Shaw =

Greatest hits album by Sandie Shaw
- Released: 2005
- Genre: Pop
- Label: EMI

Sandie Shaw chronology
Nothing Comes Easy (2004)	The Very Best of Sandie Shaw (2005)	The Collection (2007)

The Very Best of Sandie Shaw is a compilation album by the British singer Sandie Shaw. Released in 2005 by EMI, it contained digitally remastered versions of all her most popular hit singles from 1964 to 1988. It was the first compilation to feature the original recordings of all her UK chart hits.

== Track listing ==
All tracks are written by Chris Andrews, except where noted.

No.	Title	Writer(s)	Length
1.	"(There's) Always Something There to Remind Me"	Burt Bacharach, Hal David	2:46
2.	"Girl Don't Come"		2:13
3.	"I'll Stop at Nothing"		3:00
4.	"Long Live Love"		2:22
5.	"Message Understood"		3:01
6.	"How Can You Tell"		2:42
7.	"Tomorrow"		2:55
8.	"Nothing Comes Easy"		2:31
9.	"Run"		2:38
10.	"Think Sometimes About Me"		2:22
11.	"I Don't Need Anything"	Lee Pockriss, Paul Vance	2:38
12.	"Puppet on a String"	Phil Coulter, Bill Martin	2:23
13.	"Tonight in Tokyo"	Coulter, Martin	2:40
14.	"You've Not Changed"		2:19
15.	"Today"		2:20
16.	"Together"	Harry Nilsson	2:21
17.	"Those Were the Days"	Eugene Raskin	3:50
18.	"Monsieur Dupont"	Christian Bruhn, Peter Callander	2:52
19.	"Think It All Over"		2:58
20.	"Heaven Knows I'm Missing Him Now"	Anthony Instone, John MacLeod	2:39
21.	"Rose Garden"	Joseph Souter	3:12
22.	"Father and Son"	Yusuf Islam	3:28
23.	"Anyone Who Had a Heart"	Bacharach, David	3:14
24.	"Hand in Glove"	Johnny Marr, Steven Morrissey	2:35
25.	"Are You Ready to Be Heartbroken"	Neil Clark, Lloyd Cole	3:29
26.	"Nothing Less Than Brilliant"	Sandra Goodrich, Andrews	3:38
