= List of UK top-ten singles in 1965 =

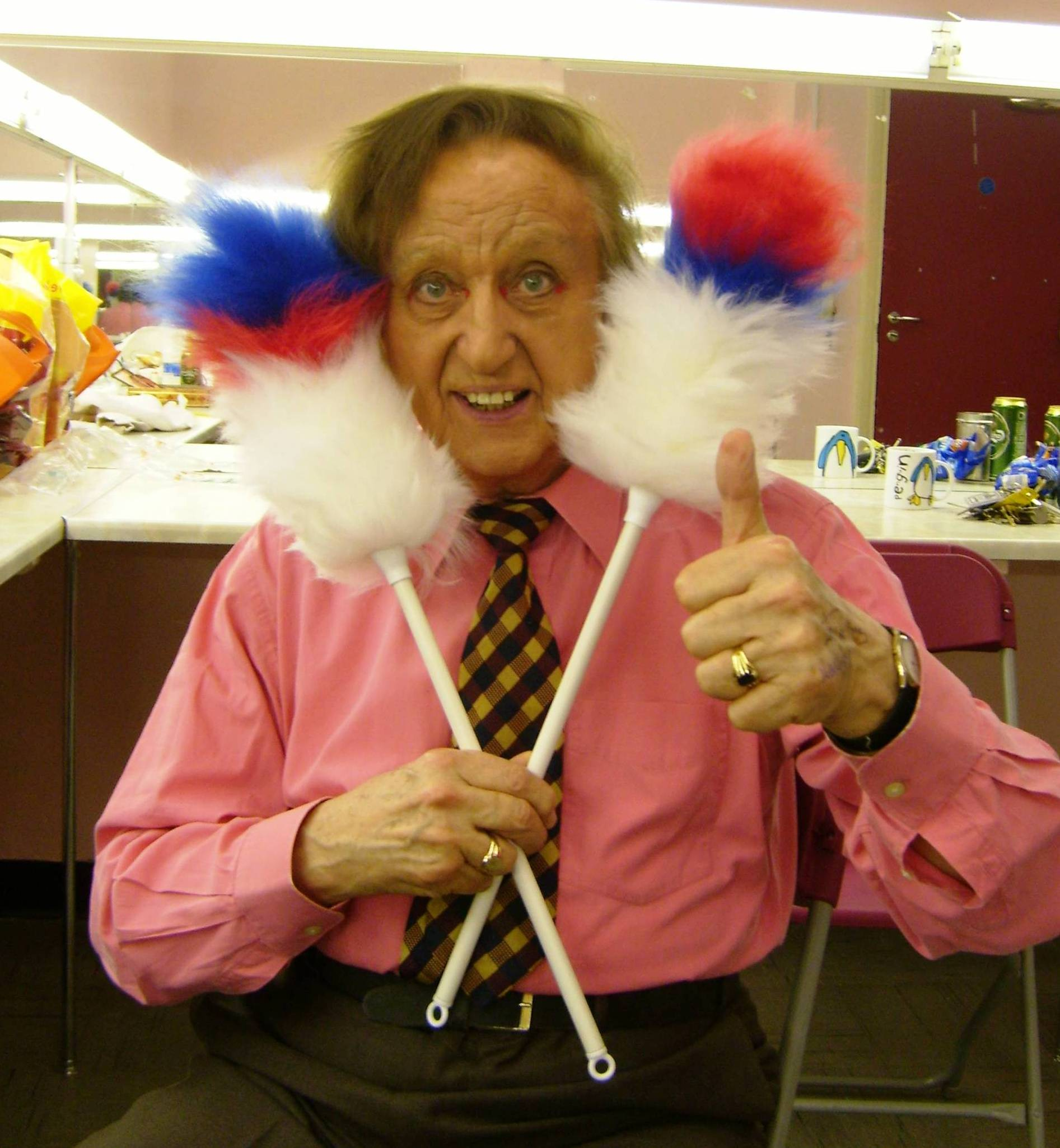
Ken Dodd (pictured in 2007) achieved the biggest-selling single of 1965 with his cover version of "Tears". The song spent seventeen weeks in the UK top 10 - five of those at the top spot - and went on to rank as the 3rd best-selling single of the 1960s. Dodd had a second top 10 later in the year with "The River", which peaked at number three.

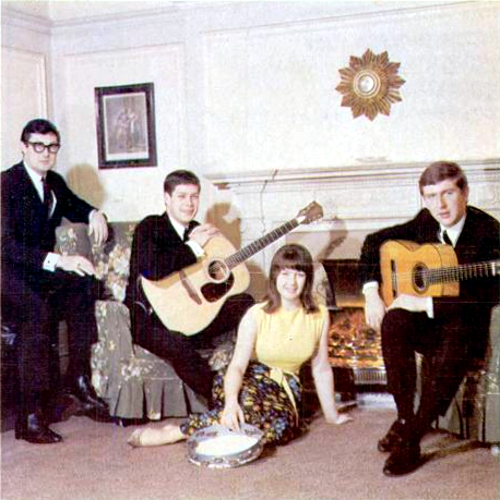
Australian group The Seekers had three UK top 10 entries in their breakthrough year, including the number-one singles "I'll Never Find Another You" and "The Carnival Is Over". The latter is one of the UK's biggest-selling singles of all time, with sales of 1.41 million copies.

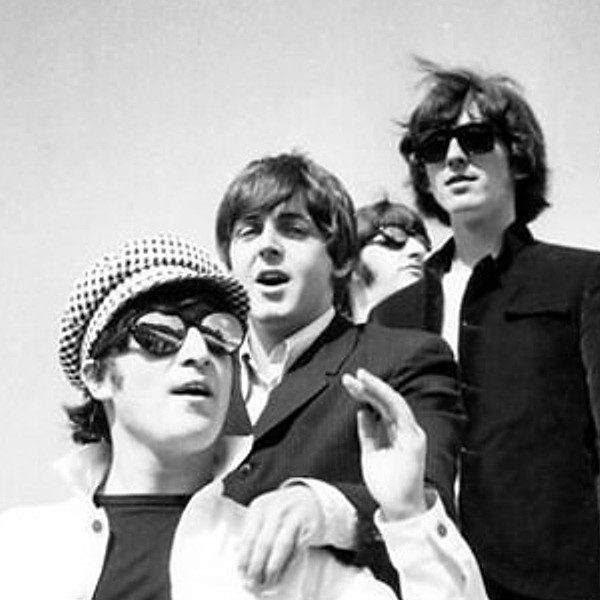
The Beatles continued to dominate the charts in 1965, securing four UK top 10 entries during the year, all of which topped the chart: "I Feel Fine" (from 1964), "Ticket to Ride", "Help!" and "Day Tripper"/"We Can Work It Out".

The UK Singles Chart is one of many music charts compiled by the Official Charts Company that calculates the best-selling singles of the week in the United Kingdom. Before 2004, the chart was only based on the sales of physical singles. This list shows singles that peaked in the Top 10 of the UK Singles Chart during 1965, as well as singles which peaked in 1964 and 1966 but were in the top 10 in 1965. The entry date is when the single appeared in the top 10 for the first time (week ending, as published by the Official Charts Company, which is six days after the chart is announced).

One-hundred and eighteen singles were in the top ten in 1965. Eight singles from 1964 remained in the top 10 for several weeks at the beginning of the year, while "Let's Hang On!" by The Four Seasons and "My Ship Is Comin' In" by The Walker Brothers were both released in 1965 but did not reach their peak until 1966. "Somewhere" by P. J. Proby, "Terry" by Twinkle and "Yeh, Yeh" by Georgie Fame and the Blue Flames were the singles from 1964 to reach their peak in 1965. Thirty-one artists scored multiple entries in the top 10 in 1965. Bob Dylan, The Seekers, Sonny & Cher, Tom Jones and The Who were among the many artists who achieved their first UK charting top 10 single in 1965.

The 1964 Christmas number-one, "I Feel Fine" by The Beatles, remained at number one for the first week of 1965. The first new number-one single of the year was "Yeh, Yeh" by Georgie Fame and the Blue Flames. Overall, twenty-four different singles peaked at number-one in 1965, with The Rolling Stones and The Beatles (3) having the joint most singles hit that position.

== Background ==
=== Multiple entries ===
One-hundred and eighteen singles charted in the top 10 in 1965, with one-hundred and ten singles reaching their peak this year. Two songs were recorded by several artists with each version reaching the top 10:

- "All I Really Want to Do" – The Byrds, Cher
- "You've Lost That Lovin' Feelin'" – Cilla Black, The Righteous Brothers

Thirty-one artists scored multiple entries in the top 10 in 1965. The Animals, The Beatles, Bob Dylan, Gene Pitney and Sandie Shaw shared the record for most top 10 hits in 1965 with four hit singles each.

Ken Dodd was one of a number of artists with two top-ten entries, including the number-one single "Tears". Cher, Dusty Springfield, Manfred Mann, The Shadows and Val Doonican were among the other artists who had multiple top 10 entries in 1965.

=== Chart debuts ===
Thirty-three artists achieved their first top 10 single in 1965, either as a lead or featured artist. Of these, seven went on to record another hit single that year: Cher, Donovan, The Fortunes, The Ivy League, Sonny, Them and The Walker Brothers. The Seekers, The Who and The Yardbirds all had two more top 10 singles in 1965. Bob Dylan had three other entries in his breakthrough year.

The following table (collapsed on desktop site) does not include acts who had previously charted as part of a group and secured their first top 10 solo single.

Artist	Number of top 10s	First entry	Chart position	Other entries
The Moody Blues	1	"Go Now"	1	—
Sounds Orchestral	1	"Cast Your Fate to the Wind"	5	—
The Righteous Brothers	1	"You've Lost That Lovin' Feelin'"	1	—
The Seekers	3	"I'll Never Find Another You"	1	"A World of Our Own" (3), "The Carnival Is Over" (1)
Them	2	"Baby, Please Don't Go"	10	"Here Comes the Night" (2)
The Ivy League	2	"Funny How Love Can Be"	8	"Tossing and Turning" (3)
Tom Jones	1	"It's Not Unusual"	1	—
Unit 4 + 2	1	"Concrete and Clay"	1	—
The Yardbirds	3	"For Your Love"	3	"Heart Full of Soul" (2), "Evil Hearted You"/"Still I'm Sad" (3)
Donovan	2	"Catch the Wind"	4	"Colours" (4)
The Who	3	"I Can't Explain"	8	"Anyway, Anyhow, Anywhere" (10), "My Generation" (2)
Bob Dylan	4	"The Times They Are a-Changin'"	9	"Subterranean Homesick Blues" (9), "Like a Rolling Stone" (4), "Positively 4th Street" (8)
Roger Miller	1	"King of the Road"	1	—
Jackie Trent	1	"Where Are You Now"	1	—
Shirley Ellis	1	"The Clapping Song"	6	—
Burt Bacharach	1	"Trains and Boats and Planes"	4	—
The Byrds	1	"Mr. Tambourine Man"	1	"All I Really Want to Do" (4)
The Fortunes	2	"You've Got Your Troubles"	2	"Here It Comes Again" (4)
Joan Baez	1	"There but for Fortune"	8	—
Jonathan King	1	"Everyone's Gone to the Moon"	4	—
Sonny & Cher	1	"I Got You Babe"	1	—
Cher	2	"I Got You Babe"	1	"All I Really Want to Do" (9)
Sonny	2	"I Got You Babe"	1	"Laugh at Me" (9)
Horst Jankowski	1	"A Walk in the Black Forest"	3	—
Marcello Minerbi	1	"Zorba's Dance"	6	—
The Walker Brothers	2	"Make It Easy on Yourself"	1	"My Ship Is Comin' In" (3) ^{[A]}
Barry McGuire	1	"Eve of Destruction"	3	—
Nini Rosso	1	"Il Silenzio"	8	—
The McCoys	1	"Hang On Sloopy"	5	—
Hedgehoppers Anonymous	1	"It's Good News Week"	5	—
Chris Andrews	1	"Yesterday Man"	3	—
Len Barry	1	"1-2-3"	3	—
The Toys	1	"A Lover's Concerto"	5	—

Notes

Cher and Sonny Bono made their debut as the duo Sonny and Cher, reaching number-one with "I Got You Babe". They both had an individual chart entry later in the year - "All I Really Want to Do" and "Laugh at Me" respectively both peaking at number 9.

=== Songs from films ===
Original songs from various films entered the top 10 throughout the year. These included "Ferry Cross the Mersey" (Ferry Cross the Mersey), "Help!" and "Ticket to Ride" (Help!) and "Zorba's Dance" (Zorba the Greek).

Additionally, P. J. Proby released a cover version of "Maria" from the film West Side Story, reaching number eight at the end of 1965.

=== Best-selling singles ===
Until 1970 there was no universally recognised year-end best-sellers list. However, in 2011 the Official Charts Company released a list of the best-selling single of each year in chart history from 1952 to date. According to the list, "Tears" by Ken Dodd is officially recorded as the biggest-selling single of 1965. "Tears" (3), "The Carnival Is Over" (6) and "Day Tripper"/"We Can Work It Out" (7) all ranked in the top 10 best-selling singles of the decade.

== Top-ten singles ==
Key

Symbol	Meaning
‡	Single peaked in 1964 but still in chart in 1965.
♦	Single released in 1965 but peaked in 1966.
(#)	Year-end best-selling single.
Entered	The date that the single first appeared in the chart.
Peak	Highest position that the single reached in the UK Singles Chart.

Entered (week ending)	Weeks in top 10	Single	Artist	Peak	Peak reached (week ending)	Weeks at peak
Singles in 1964
26 November 1964	7	"I'm Gonna Be Strong" ‡	Gene Pitney	2	3 December 1964	2
26 November 1964	9	"Downtown" ‡	Petula Clark	2	17 December 1964	3
3 December 1964	8	"I Feel Fine" ‡	The Beatles	1	10 December 1964	5
10 December 1964	7	"Walk Tall" ‡	Val Doonican	3	17 December 1964	2
17 December 1964	4	"I Could Easily Fall (in Love with You)" ‡	Cliff Richard & The Shadows	6	31 December 1964	1
24 December 1964	5	"Somewhere"	P. J. Proby	6	14 January 1965	2
31 December 1964	6	"Yeh, Yeh"	Georgie Fame and the Blue Flames	1	14 January 1965	2
31 December 1964	6	"Terry"	Twinkle	4	7 January 1965	3
Singles in 1965
7 January 1965	5	"Girl Don't Come"	Sandie Shaw	3	21 January 1965	1
7 January 1965	7	"Go Now"	The Moody Blues	1	28 January 1965	1
14 January 1965	3	"Ferry Cross the Mersey"	Gerry and the Pacemakers	8	21 January 1965	1
14 January 1965	5	"Cast Your Fate to the Wind"	Sounds Orchestral	5	21 January 1965	1
28 January 1965	3	"You've Lost That Lovin' Feelin'"	Cilla Black	2	28 January 1965	1
28 January 1965	5	"You've Lost That Lovin' Feelin'"	The Righteous Brothers	1	4 February 1965	2
28 January 1965	4	"Come Tomorrow"	Manfred Mann	4	4 February 1965	1
28 January 1965	6	"Tired of Waiting for You"	The Kinks	1	18 February 1965	1
4 February 1965	4	"Keep Searchin' (We'll Follow the Sun)"	Del Shannon	3	11 February 1965	1
11 February 1965	8	"I'll Never Find Another You"	The Seekers	1	25 February 1965	2
11 February 1965	4	"The Special Years"	Val Doonican	7	11 February 1965	4
11 February 1965	1	"Baby, Please Don't Go"	Them	10	11 February 1965	1
18 February 1965	5	"The Game of Love"	Wayne Fontana & The Mindbenders	2	25 February 1965	1
18 February 1965	4	"Don't Let Me Be Misunderstood"	The Animals	3	25 February 1965	1
18 February 1965	3	"Funny How Love Can Be"	The Ivy League	8	4 March 1965	1
25 February 1965	1	"It Hurts So Much (To See You Go)"	Jim Reeves	8	25 February 1965	1
25 February 1965	7	"It's Not Unusual"	Tom Jones	1	11 March 1965	1
4 March 1965	6	"Silhouettes"	Herman's Hermits	3	11 March 1965	3
4 March 1965	4	"I Must Be Seeing Things"	Gene Pitney	6	4 March 1965	1
4 March 1965	6	"Come and Stay with Me"	Marianne Faithfull	4	25 March 1965	1
11 March 1965	3	"I'll Stop At Nothing"	Sandie Shaw	4	11 March 1965	1
11 March 1965	7	"The Last Time"	The Rolling Stones	1	18 March 1965	3
11 March 1965	2	"Yes I Will"	The Hollies	9	18 March 1965	1
18 March 1965	3	"Goodbye My Love"	The Searchers	4	1 April 1965	1
25 March 1965	6	"Concrete and Clay"	Unit 4 + 2	1	8 April 1965	1
25 March 1965	8	"The Minute You're Gone"	Cliff Richard	1	15 April 1965	1
1 April 1965	4	"For Your Love"	The Yardbirds	3	8 April 1965	2
1 April 1965	6	"Catch the Wind"	Donovan	4	15 April 1965	1
8 April 1965	6	"Here Comes the Night"	Them	2	22 April 1965	1
8 April 1965	2	"I Can't Explain"	The Who	8	15 April 1965	1
15 April 1965	2	"Stop! In the Name of Love" ^{[B]}	The Supremes	7	15 April 1965	1
15 April 1965	1	"The Times They Are a-Changin'"	Bob Dylan	9	15 April 1965	1
15 April 1965	6	"Pop Go the Workers"	The Barron Knights	5	29 April 1965	1
22 April 1965	7	"Ticket to Ride"	The Beatles	1	22 April 1965	3
22 April 1965	3	"Little Things"	Dave Berry	5	22 April 1965	1
22 April 1965	7	"King of the Road"	Roger Miller	1	13 May 1965	1
29 April 1965	3	"Bring It On Home to Me"	The Animals	7	29 April 1965	2
6 May 1965	7	"A World of Our Own"	The Seekers	3	13 May 1965	3
6 May 1965	5	"True Love Ways"	Peter and Gordon	2	20 May 1965	1
13 May 1965	5	"Where Are You Now" ^{[C]}	Jackie Trent	1	20 May 1965	1
13 May 1965	3	"Subterranean Homesick Blues"	Bob Dylan	9	20 May 1965	2
20 May 1965	4	"This Little Bird"	Marianne Faithfull	6	20 May 1965	3
20 May 1965	1	"Wonderful World"	Herman's Hermits	7	20 May 1965	1
20 May 1965	7	"Long Live Love"	Sandie Shaw	1	27 May 1965	3
27 May 1965	5	"Poor Man's Son"	The Rockin' Berries	5	3 June 1965	2
27 May 1965	6	"The Clapping Song"	Shirley Ellis	6	24 June 1965	1
3 June 1965	5	"Trains and Boats and Planes"	Burt Bacharach	4	24 June 1965	1
10 June 1965	7	"Crying in the Chapel"	Elvis Presley	1	17 June 1965	2
10 June 1965	6	"The Price of Love"	The Everly Brothers	2	17 June 1965	1
10 June 1965	9	"I'm Alive"	The Hollies	1	24 June 1965	3
17 June 1965	1	"Marie"	The Bachelors	9	17 June 1965	1
17 June 1965	4	"Colours"	Donovan	4	1 July 1965	1
24 June 1965	2	"Set Me Free" ^{[D]}	The Kinks	9	24 June 1965	2
24 June 1965	5	"Looking Through the Eyes of Love"	Gene Pitney	3	8 July 1965	1
1 July 1965	1	"Anyway, Anyhow, Anywhere"	The Who	10	1 July 1965	1
8 July 1965	5	"Heart Full of Soul"	The Yardbirds	2	15 July 1965	3
8 July 1965	4	"To Know You Is to Love You"	Peter and Gordon	5	8 July 1965	2
8 July 1965	7	"Mr. Tambourine Man"	The Byrds	1	22 July 1965	2
8 July 1965	3	"Leave a Little Love"	Lulu	8	15 July 1965	2
8 July 1965	6	"Tossing and Turning"	The Ivy League	3	22 July 1965	1
15 July 1965	4	"In the Middle of Nowhere"	Dusty Springfield	8	29 July 1965	1
22 July 1965	6	"You've Got Your Troubles"	The Fortunes	2	19 August 1965	1
29 July 1965	8	"Help!"	The Beatles	1	5 August 1965	3
29 July 1965	5	"We Gotta Get Out of This Place"	The Animals	2	12 August 1965	1
29 July 1965	3	"There but for Fortune"	Joan Baez	8	5 August 1965	2
5 August 1965	4	"Catch Us If You Can"	The Dave Clark Five	5	12 August 1965	1
12 August 1965	4	"Everyone's Gone to the Moon"	Jonathan King	4	26 August 1965	1
12 August 1965	2	"In Thoughts of You"	Billy Fury	9	12 August 1965	1
12 August 1965	1	"Summer Nights"	Marianne Faithfull	10	12 August 1965	1
19 August 1965	7	"I Got You Babe"	Sonny & Cher	1	26 August 1965	2
19 August 1965	7	"A Walk in the Black Forest"	Horst Jankowski	3	26 August 1965	1
19 August 1965	6	"Zorba's Dance"	Marcello Minerbi	6	2 September 1965	1
26 August 1965	3	"All I Really Want to Do"	The Byrds	4	2 September 1965	1
26 August 1965	1	"Don't Make My Baby Blue"	The Shadows	10	26 August 1965	1
2 September 1965	7	"(I Can't Get No) Satisfaction"	The Rolling Stones	1	9 September 1965	2
2 September 1965	8	"Make It Easy on Yourself"	The Walker Brothers	1	23 September 1965	1
2 September 1965	6	"Like a Rolling Stone"	Bob Dylan	4	16 September 1965	1
2 September 1965	1	"See My Friends"	The Kinks	10	2 September 1965	1
9 September 1965	1	"All I Really Want to Do"	Cher	9	9 September 1965	1
9 September 1965	3	"Laugh at Me"	Sonny	9	16 September 1965	1
16 September 1965	5	"Look Through Any Window"	The Hollies	4	30 September 1965	1
16 September 1965	17	"Tears" (#1)	Ken Dodd	1	30 September 1965	5
23 September 1965	7	"Eve of Destruction"	Barry McGuire	3	28 October 1965	1
30 September 1965	5	"If You Gotta Go, Go Now"	Manfred Mann	2	7 October 1965	1
30 September 1965	3	"Il Silenzio"	Nini Rosso	8	14 October 1965	1
7 October 1965	6	"Almost There"	Andy Williams	2	14 October 1965	3
7 October 1965	4	"Hang On Sloopy"	The McCoys	5	14 October 1965	2
14 October 1965	2	"Message Understood"	Sandie Shaw	6	21 October 1965	1
21 October 1965	1	"Some of Your Lovin'"	Dusty Springfield	8	21 October 1965	1
21 October 1965	5	"Evil Hearted You"/"Still I'm Sad"	The Yardbirds	3	4 November 1965	1
21 October 1965	4	"It's Good News Week"	Hedgehoppers Anonymous	5	4 November 1965	1
28 October 1965	6	"Yesterday Man"	Chris Andrews	3	11 November 1965	2
28 October 1965	5	"Here It Comes Again"	The Fortunes	4	11 November 1965	1
28 October 1965	3	"Yesterday"	Matt Monro	8	4 November 1965	2
4 November 1965	6	"Get Off of My Cloud"	The Rolling Stones	1	4 November 1965	3
4 November 1965	4	"It's My Life"	The Animals	7	11 November 1965	3
11 November 1965	11	"The Carnival Is Over"	The Seekers	1	25 November 1965	3
18 November 1965	7	"My Generation"	The Who	2	25 November 1965	2
18 November 1965	7	"1-2-3"	Len Barry	3	2 December 1965	1
18 November 1965	3	"Positively 4th Street"	Bob Dylan	8	2 December 1965	1
25 November 1965	9	"Wind Me Up (Let Me Go)"	Cliff Richard	2	23 December 1965	3
2 December 1965	5	"A Lover's Concerto"	The Toys	5	2 December 1965	2
2 December 1965	2	"Princess in Rags"	Gene Pitney	9	2 December 1965	1
9 December 1965	9	"Day Tripper"/"We Can Work It Out"	The Beatles	1	16 December 1965	5
9 December 1965	8	"The River"	Ken Dodd	3	23 December 1965	2
16 December 1965	1	"Maria"	P. J. Proby	8	16 December 1965	1
16 December 1965	8	"My Ship Is Comin' In" ♦	The Walker Brothers	3	20 January 1966	1
23 December 1965	7	"Let's Hang On!" ♦	The Four Seasons	4	20 January 1966	1

== Entries by artist ==
The following table shows artists who achieved two or more top 10 entries in 1965, including singles that reached their peak in 1964 or 1966. The figures include both main artists and featured artists. The total number of weeks an artist spent in the top ten in 1965 is also shown.

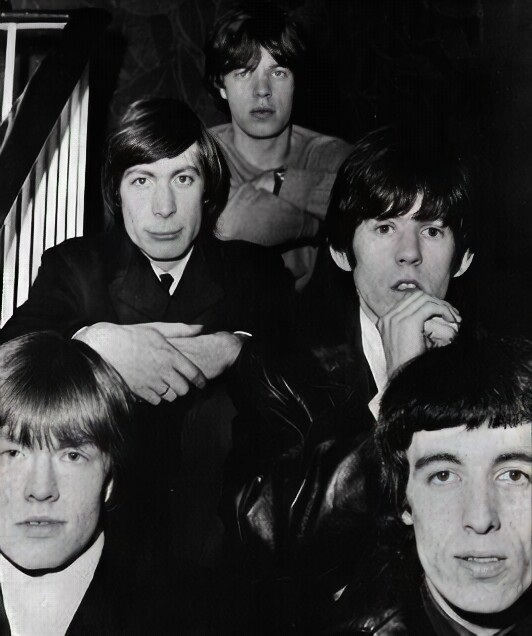
The Rolling Stones achieved three consecutive UK number-one singles with their three top 10 entries of this year: "The Last Time", "(I Can't Get No) Satisfaction" and "Get Off of My Cloud".

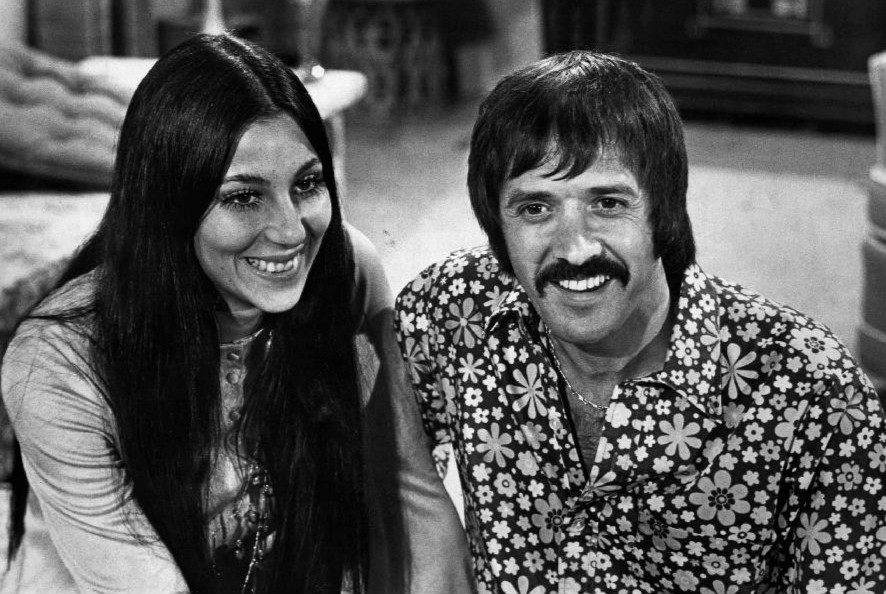
Sonny & Cher made their UK top 10 debut in August 1965 with "I Got You Babe", which spent two weeks at number-one. Cher and Sonny both had a solo entry this year as well - "All I Really Want to Do" and "Laugh at Me", both of which peaked at number 9.

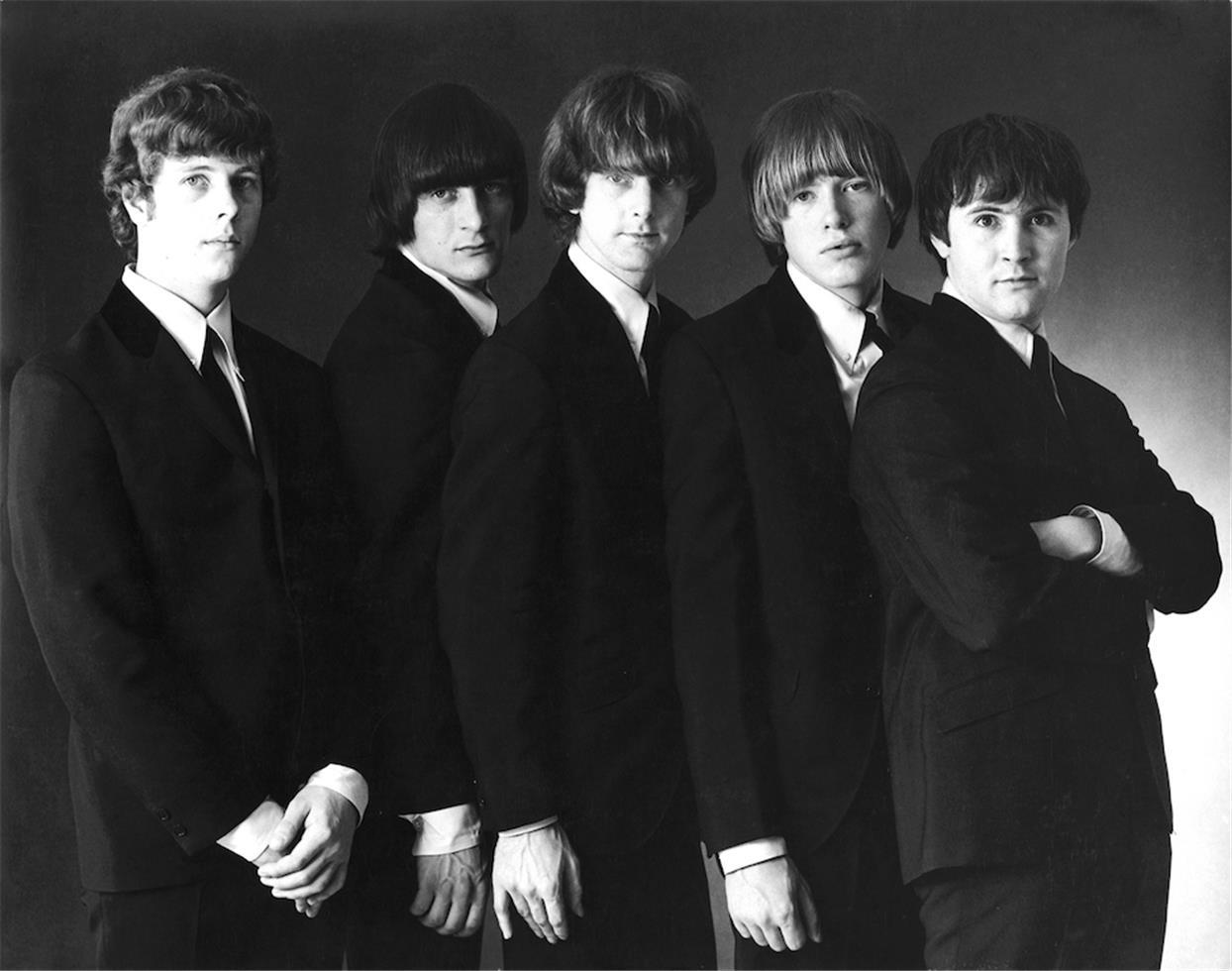
The Byrds secured their only two UK top 10 entries this year, "Mr. Tambourine Man" and "All I Really Want to Do", both written by Bob Dylan, with the former spending two weeks at number-one.

Entries	Artist	Weeks	Singles
4	The Animals	16	"Bring It On Home to Me", "Don't Let Me Be Misunderstood", "It's My Life", "We Gotta Get Out of This Place"
4	The Beatles ^{[E]}	22	"Day Tripper"/"We Can Work It Out", "Help!", "I Feel Fine", "Ticket to Ride"
4	Bob Dylan	13	"Like a Rolling Stone", "Positively 4th Street", "Subterranean Homesick Blues", "The Times They Are a-Changin'"
4	Gene Pitney ^{[E]}	13	"I Must Be Seeing Things", "I'm Gonna Be Strong", "Looking Through the Eyes of Love", "Princess in Rags"
4	Sandie Shaw	17	"Girl Don't Come", "I'll Stop at Nothing", "Long Live Love", "Message Understood"
3	Cliff Richard ^{[F]}	15	"I Could Easily Fall (in Love with You)", "The Minute You're Gone", "Wind Me Up (Let Me Go)"
3	The Hollies	16	"I'm Alive", "Look Through Any Window", "Yes I Will"
3	The Kinks	9	"See My Friends", "Set Me Free", "Tired of Waiting for You"
3	Marianne Faithfull	11	"Come and Stay with Me", "Summer Nights", "This Little Bird"
3	The Rolling Stones	20	"Get Off of My Cloud", "(I Can't Get No) Satisfaction", "The Last Time"
3	The Seekers	22	"A World of Our Own", "I'll Never Find Another You", "The Carnival Is Over"
3	The Who	9	"Anyway, Anyhow, Anywhere", "I Can't Explain", "My Generation"
3	The Yardbirds	14	"For Your Love", "Heart Full of Soul", "Evil Hearted You"/"Still I'm Sad"
2	The Byrds	10	"All I Really Want to Do", "Mr. Tambourine Man"
2	Cher ^{[G]}	8	"All I Really Want to Do", "I Got You Babe"
2	Donovan	10	"Catch the Wind", "Colours"
2	Dusty Springfield	5	"In the Middle of Nowhere", "Some of Your Lovin'"
2	The Fortunes	11	"Here It Comes Again", "You've Got Your Troubles"
2	Herman's Hermits	7	"Silhouettes", "Wonderful World"
2	The Ivy League	9	"Funny How Love Can Be", "Tossing and Turning"
2	Ken Dodd	18	"Tears", "The River"
2	Manfred Mann	9	"Come Tomorrow", "If You Gotta Go, Go Now"
2	Peter and Gordon	9	"To Know You Is to Love You", "True Love Ways"
2	P. J. Proby ^{[F]}	5	"Maria", "Somewhere"
2	The Shadows ^{[F]}	3	"Don't Make My Baby Blue", "I Could Easily Fall (in Love with You)"
2	Sonny ^{[G]}	10	"I Got You Babe", "Laugh at Me"
2	Them	7	"Baby, Please Don't Go", "Here Comes the Night"
2	Val Doonican ^{[E]}	8	"The Special Years", "Walk Tall"
2	The Walker Brothers ^{[H]}	10	"Make It Easy on Yourself", "My Ship Is Comin' In"

== See also ==
- 1965 in British music
- List of number-one singles from the 1960s (UK)

== Notes ==
- ^{a} "My Ship is Coming In" reached its peak of number three on 20 January 1966 (week ending).
- ^{b} "Stop! In the Name of Love" re-entered the top 10 at number 10 on 29 April 1965 (week ending).
- ^{c} "Where Are You Now" was the theme song to the television series It's Dark Outside (a spin-off from The Odd Man). It was released as a single due to public demand and went to number-one.
- ^{d} "Set Me Free" was used in the BBC television drama Up the Junction, created by Ken Loach in 1965. It was the first time a Kinks song had been featured in a television series or film.
- ^{e} Figure includes single that peaked in 1964.
- ^{f} Figure includes single that first charted in 1964 but peaked in 1965.
- ^{g} Figure includes a top 10 hit as the duo Sonny & Cher.
- ^{h} Figure includes single that peaked in 1966.
