= The Collection (Sandie Shaw album) =

Compilation album by Sandie Shaw
- Released: 2007
- Genre: Pop
- Label: EMI

Sandie Shaw chronology
The Very Best of Sandie Shaw (2005)	The Collection (2007)

The Collection is a compilation album by the British singer Sandie Shaw, which was released in 2007 shortly after her 60th birthday. Released as a budget-priced album by EMI (to whom Shaw licensed her entire recording catalogue some years previously), it contained mostly recordings from the 1960s (the decade in which Shaw was at the height of her fame) including A-sides (such as two UK number one hits - the Burt Bacharach/Hal David-penned "(There's) Always Something There to Remind Me" and the Eurovision-winning "Puppet on a String"), B-sides, album tracks plus two exclusive foreign language songs.

== Track listing ==
1. "(There's) Always Something There to Remind Me"
2. "Don't You Know"
3. "I'll Stop at Nothing"
4. "Downtown"
5. "Baby I Need Your Loving"
6. "Message Understood"
7. "Don't You Count On It"
8. "When I Fall in Love"
9. "Do You Mind"
10. "Tomorrow"
11. "Think Sometimes About Me"
12. "Puppet on a String"
13. "Tell The Boys"
14. "You've Not Changed"
15. "I Get a Kick Out of You"
16. "Those Were the Days"
17. "Du lügst so wunderbar" ("One More Lie")
18. "Scarborough Fair"
19. "What Now My Love"
20. "Monsieur Dupont"
21. "Send Me a Letter"
22. "Love Me Do"
23. "Reviewing the Situation"
24. "Dieu seul sait" ("Heaven Knows I'm Missing Him Now")
25. "Usignolo, usignolo" (Maple Village)
