= The Golden Hits of Sandie Shaw =

Greatest hits album by Sandie Shaw
- Released: 1966
- Genre: Pop
- Label: Pye

Sandie Shaw chronology
Me (1965)	The Golden Hits of Sandie Shaw (1966)	Puppet on a String (1967)

Professional ratings
Review scores
Source	Rating
Record Mirror	4/5 stars

The Golden Hits of Sandie Shaw is a compilation album by the British singer Sandie Shaw. Released in April 1966 by Pye Records on their budget Golden Guinea label, it contains all of the "A" sides and "B" sides of all her UK chart singles from 1964 to the end of 1965, which was technically all of her singles apart from her first which had failed to make an impression on the chart. The Golden Hits compilation did not enter the UK Albums Chart. This album has never been released on CD.

== Track listing and song information ==
1. "(There's) Always Something There to Remind Me"
2. "Long Live Love"
3. "Don't You Know"
4. "I've Heard About Him"
5. "I'd Be Far Better Off Without You"
6. "I'll Stop at Nothing"
7. "How Can You Tell"
8. "You Can't Blame Him"
9. "Don't You Count On It"
10. "Message Understood"
11. "If Ever You Need Me"
12. "Girl Don't Come"

Of the twelve songs featured on The Golden Hits of Sandie Shaw, eleven are written by Chris Andrews who was hired as Shaw's songwriter on her signing to Pye Records in 1964. The only song not written by him is the opener of side one - Shaw's breakthrough single "(There's) Always Something There to Remind Me," which is by American songwriting duo Burt Bacharach and Hal David. The song had originally been a minor hit in the US for Lou Johnson and was discovered by Shaw's manager, Eve Taylor, on a song-hunting trip to America. Shaw's version of the song was her breakthrough single, staying at number one on the UK Singles Chart for three weeks in the autumn of 1964.

Shaw's other number one single by this point, "Long Live Love", is the second track on The Golden Hits and is followed by the "B" sides to "Always Something There To Remind Me" and "Long Live Love" - a ballad entitled "Don't You Know" and the slightly more upbeat "I've Heard About Him." Next comes the ballad "I'd Be Far Better Off Without You," originally the "A" side follow-up to "Always Something There To Remind Me" but switched to the "B" side shortly after the record's release in favour of the original "B" side "Girl Don't Come." Side one of The Golden Hits ends with Shaw's third Top 5 hit "I'll Stop at Nothing".

Side two begins with the upbeat "How Can You Tell" - her first single since her breakthrough not to make the Top 10 (it peaked at number 21). Next comes "You Can't Blame Him" - the "B" side to "I'll Stop at Nothing" and then "Don't You Count On It," the "B" side to "Message Understood," Shaw's fifth Top 10 which is the next song on The Golden Hits. The final ballad on the album is "If Ever You Need Me," which was the "B" side to "How Can You Tell" and the album ends with "Girl Don't Come," her second Top 3 hit.
