= List of number-one singles of 1965 (Ireland) =

This is a list of singles that topped the Irish Singles Chart in 1965.

Prior to 1992, the Irish singles chart was compiled from trade shipments from the labels to record stores, rather than on consumer sales.

The chart release date changed from Friday to Monday effective 4 January and then to Sunday on 5 December.

Issue date	Song	Artist	Ref.
4 January	"I Feel Fine"	The Beatles	
11 January	"I Feel Fine"	The Beatles	
18 January	"The Hucklebuck"	Brendan Bowyer	
25 January	"The Hucklebuck"	Brendan Bowyer	
1 February	"The Hucklebuck"	Brendan Bowyer	
8 February	"The Hucklebuck"	Brendan Bowyer	
15 February	"The Hucklebuck"	Brendan Bowyer	
22 February	"The Hucklebuck"	Brendan Bowyer	
1 March	"The Hucklebuck"	Brendan Bowyer	
8 March	"Born to Be with You"	Butch Moore	
15 March	"Born to Be with You"	Butch Moore	
22 March	"If I Didn't Have a Dime"	Tom Dunphy	
29 March	"If I Didn't Have a Dime"	Tom Dunphy	
5 April	"Walking the Streets in the Rain"	Butch Moore	
12 April	"Walking the Streets in the Rain"	Butch Moore	
19 April	"Walking the Streets in the Rain"	Butch Moore	
26 April	"Ticket to Ride"	The Beatles	
3 May	"Ticket to Ride"	The Beatles	
10 May	"Ticket to Ride"	The Beatles	
17 May	"Ticket to Ride"	The Beatles	
24 May	"Every Step Of the Way"	Dickie Rock	
31 May	"Every Step Of the Way"	Dickie Rock	
7 June	"Every Step Of the Way"	Dickie Rock	
14 June	"Long Live Love"	Sandie Shaw	
21 June	"Long Live Love"	Sandie Shaw	
28 June	"Crying In The Chapel"	Elvis Presley	
5 July	"Crying In The Chapel"	Elvis Presley	
12 July	"Crying In The Chapel"	Elvis Presley	
19 July	"I'm Alive"	The Hollies	
26 July	"Mr. Tambourine Man"	The Byrds	
2 August	"Help!"	The Beatles	
9 August	"Help!"	The Beatles	
16 August	"Help!"	The Beatles	
23 August	"Help!"	The Beatles	
30 August	"Help!"	The Beatles	
6 September	"Don't Lose Your Hucklebuck Shoes"	Brendan Bowyer	
13 September	"(I Can't Get No) Satisfaction"	The Rolling Stones	
20 September	"(I Can't Get No) Satisfaction"	The Rolling Stones	
27 September	"(I Can't Get No) Satisfaction"	The Rolling Stones	
4 October	"(I Can't Get No) Satisfaction"	The Rolling Stones	
11 October	"Tears"	Ken Dodd	
18 October	"Tears"	Ken Dodd	
25 October	"Tears"	Ken Dodd	
1 November	"Tears"	Ken Dodd	
8 November	"Yesterday Man"	Chris Andrews	
15 November	"Yesterday Man"	Chris Andrews	
22 November	"Wishing It Was You"	Dickie Rock	
29 November	"Wishing It Was You"	Dickie Rock	
5 December	"The Carnival Is Over"	The Seekers	
12 December	"The Carnival Is Over"	The Seekers	
19 December	"Day Tripper"/"We Can Work It Out"	The Beatles	
26 December	"Day Tripper"/"We Can Work It Out"	The Beatles	

== See also ==
- 1965 in music
- Irish Singles Chart
- List of artists who reached number one in Ireland
