= List of UK top-ten singles in 1966 =

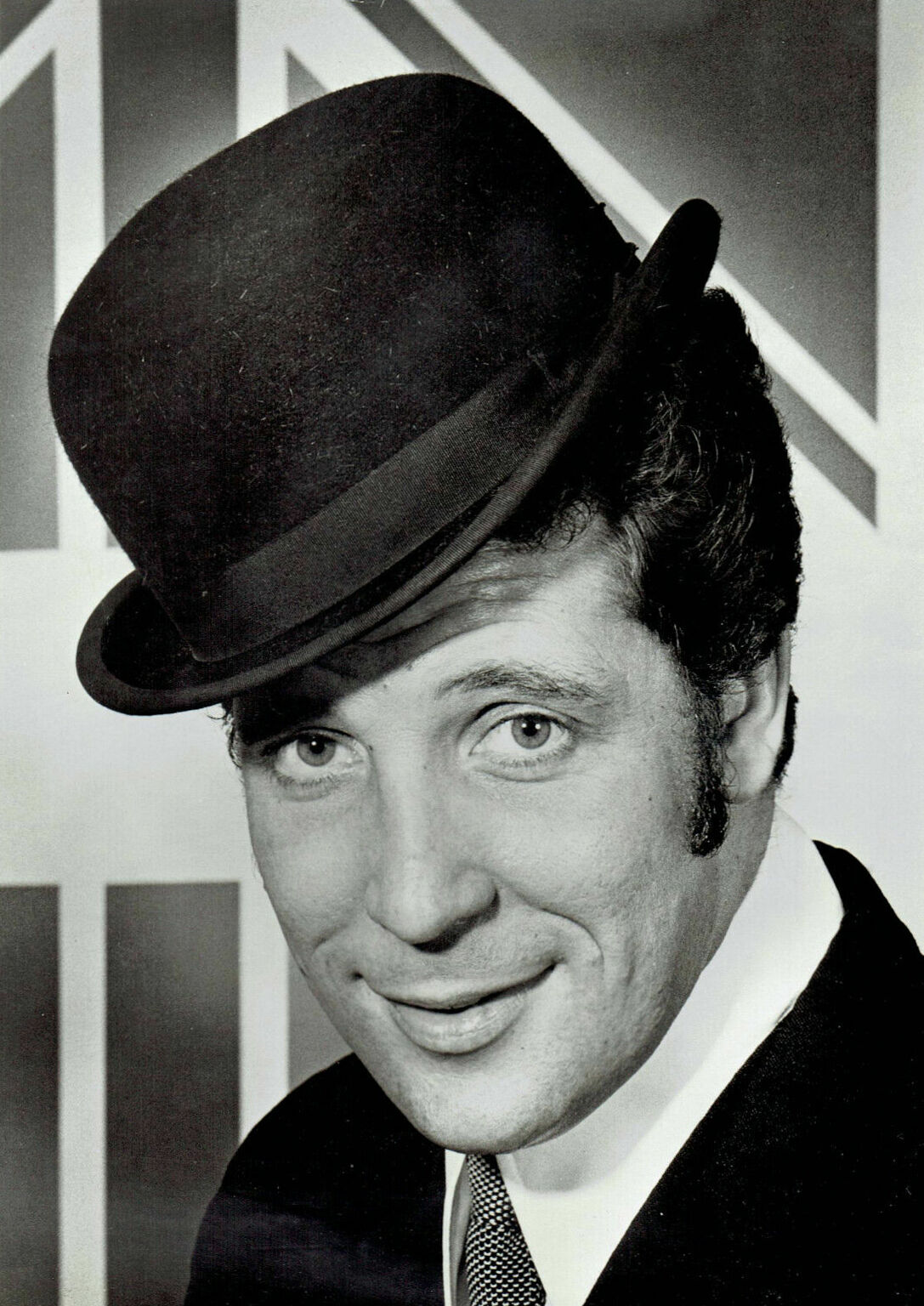
Tom Jones had the best-selling single of 1966 with "Green, Green Grass of Home". The song spent seven weeks at number-one and thirteen weeks in the top 10 in total. It also went on to be ranked as the 10th biggest-selling song of the 1960s.

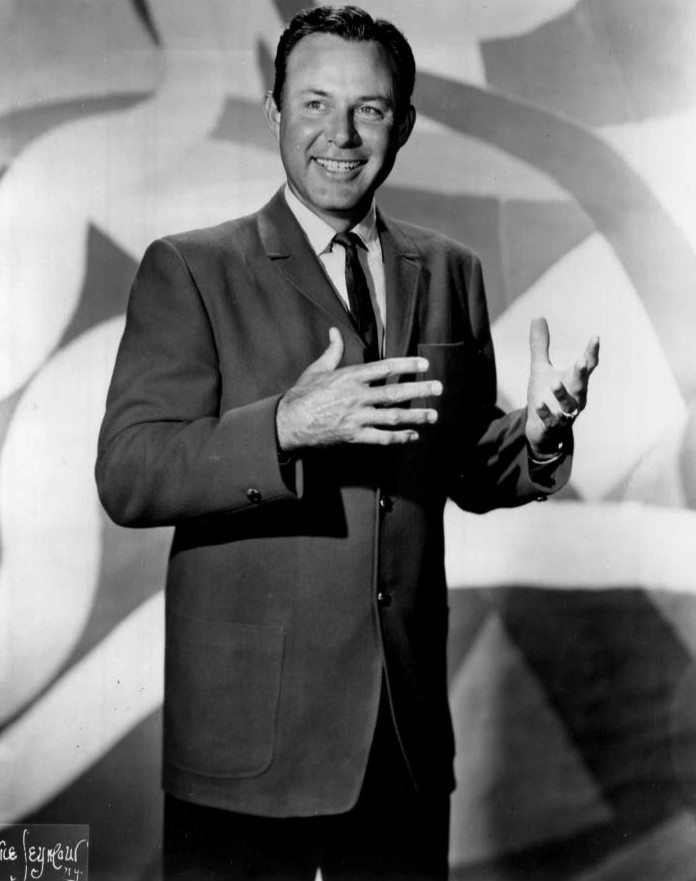
In September of this year, two years after he was killed in a plane crash, Jim Reeves posthumously achieved his only UK number-one single with "Distant Drums", which spent five weeks at the top spot.

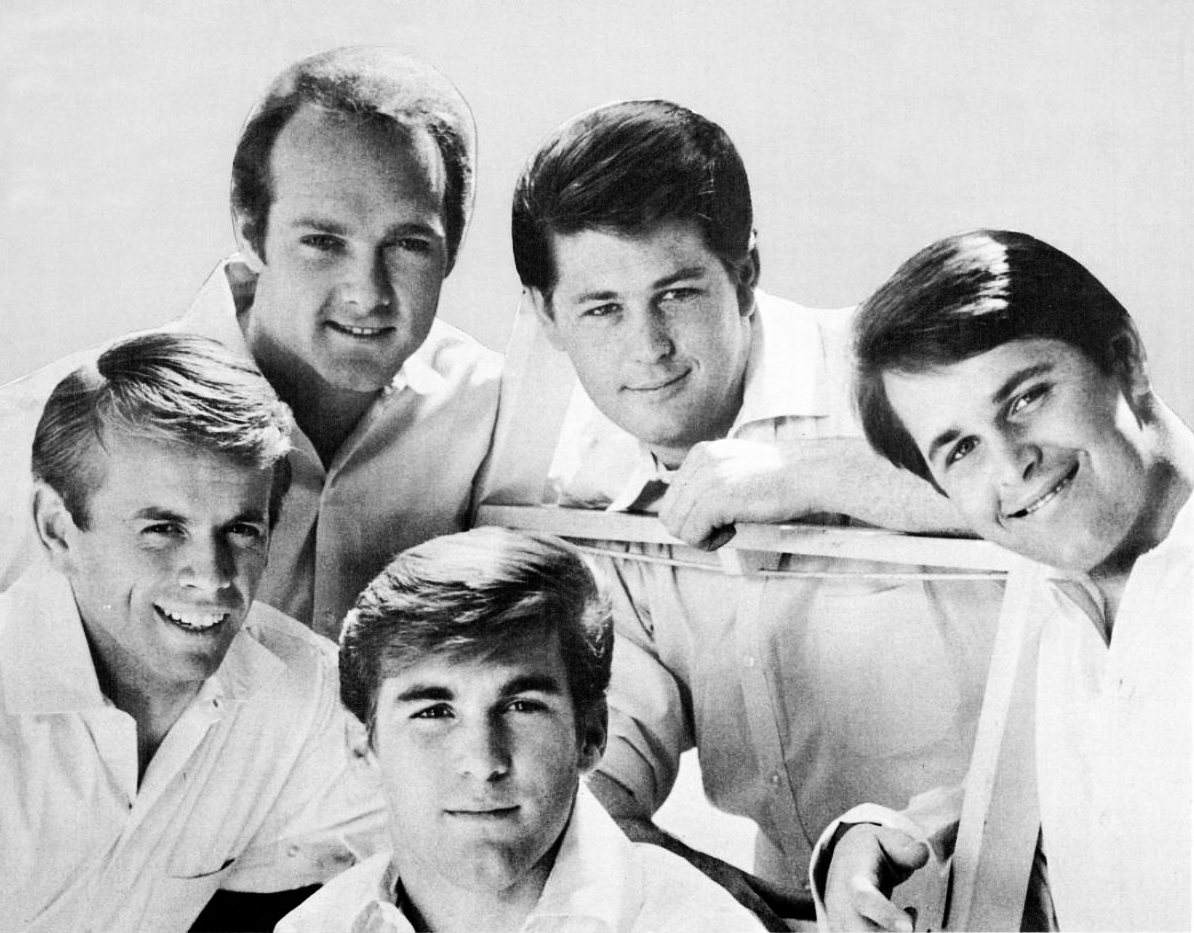
1966 proved to be a very successful year for The Beach Boys, who achieved four consecutive UK top 10 entries, all making the top three. The most successful of these was "Good Vibrations", which reached number-one for two weeks in November.

The UK Singles Chart is one of many music charts compiled by the Official Charts Company that calculates the best-selling singles of the week in the United Kingdom. Before 2004, the chart was only based on the sales of physical singles. This list shows singles that peaked in the Top 10 of the UK Singles Chart during 1966, as well as singles which peaked in 1965 but were in the top 10 in 1966. The entry date is when the single appeared in the top 10 for the first time (week ending, as published by the Official Charts Company, which is six days after the chart is announced).

One-hundred and seventeen singles were in the top ten in 1966. Seven singles from 1965 remained in the top 10 for several weeks at the beginning of the year. "Let's Hang On!" by The Four Seasons and "My Ship Is Comin' In" by The Walker Brothers were the singles from 1965 to reach their peak in 1966. Twenty-eight artists scored multiple entries in the top 10 in 1966. Dave Dee, Dozy, Beaky, Mick & Tich, Four Tops, Ike & Tina Turner, Nancy Sinatra, Small Faces and The Troggs were among the many artists who achieved their first UK charting top 10 single in 1966.

The 1965 Christmas number-one, "Day Tripper"/"We Can Work It Out" by The Beatles, remained at number one for the first two weeks of 1966. The first new number-one single of the year was "Keep On Running" by The Spencer Davis Group. Overall, twenty different singles peaked at number-one in 1966, with The Spencer Davis Group and The Beatles (2) having the joint most singles hit that position.

== Background ==
=== Multiple entries ===
One-hundred and seventeen singles charted in the top 10 in 1966, with one-hundred and twelve singles reaching their peak this year. "Elusive Butterfly" was recorded by Bob Lind and Val Doonican and both versions reached the top 10.

Twenty-eight artists scored multiple entries in the top 10 in 1966. The Beach Boys, Dave Dee, Dozy, Beaky, Mick & Tich, The Kinks and Small Faces shared the record for most top 10 hits in 1966 with four hit singles each.

The Walker Brothers were one of a number of artists with two top-ten entries, including the number-one single "The Sun Ain't Gonna Shine Anymore". Crispian St. Peters, Herman's Hermits, Petula Clark, The Supremes and Val Doonican were among the other artists who had multiple top 10 entries in 1966.

=== Chart debuts ===
Thirty artists achieved their first top 10 single in 1966, either as a lead or featured artist. Of these, three went on to record another hit single that year: Crispian St. Peters, Lee Dorsey and The Lovin' Spoonful. The Spencer Davis Group and The Troggs both had two more top 10 singles in 1966. Dave Dee, Dozy, Beaky, Mick & Tich and Small Faces each had three other entries in their breakthrough year.

The following table (collapsed on desktop site) does not include acts who had previously charted as part of a group and secured their first top 10 solo single.

| Artist | Number of top 10s | First entry | Chart position | Other entries |
|---|---|---|---|---|
| The Spencer Davis Group | 3 | "Keep on Running" | 1 | "Somebody Help Me" (1), "Gimme Some Lovin'" (2) |
| Herb Alpert & the Tijuana Brass | 1 | "Spanish Flea" | 3 | — |
| The Overlanders | 1 | "Michelle" | 1 | — |
| Crispian St. Peters | 2 | "You Were on My Mind" | 2 | "The Pied Piper" (5) |
| Nancy Sinatra | 1 | "These Boots Are Made for Walkin'" | 1 | — |
| Pinkerton's Assorted Colours | 1 | "Mirror, Mirror" | 9 | — |
| Small Faces | 4 | "Sha-La-La-La-Lee" | 3 | "Hey Girl" (10), "All or Nothing" (1), "My Mind's Eye" (4) |
| Eddy Arnold | 1 | "Make the World Go Away" | 8 | — |
| Bob Lind | 1 | "Elusive Butterfly" | 5 | — |
| Dave Dee, Dozy, Beaky, Mick & Tich | 4 | "Hold Tight!" | 4 | "Hideaway" (10), "Bend It!" (2), "Save Me" (3) ^{[A]} |
| The Alan Price Set | 1 | "I Put a Spell on You" | 9 | — |
| The Lovin' Spoonful | 2 | "Daydream" | 2 | "Summer in the City" (8) |
| Simon & Garfunkel | 1 | "Homeward Bound" | 9 | — |
| Roy C | 1 | "Shotgun Wedding" | 6 | — |
| The Troggs | 3 | "Wild Thing" | 2 | "With a Girl Like You" (1), "I Can't Control Myself" (2) |
| The Merseys | 1 | "Sorrow" | 4 | — |
| The Mamas & the Papas | 1 | "Monday, Monday" | 3 | — |
| Percy Sledge | 1 | "When a Man Loves a Woman" | 4 | "— |
| Ike & Tina Turner | 1 | "River Deep – Mountain High" | 3 | — |
| Chris Farlowe | 1 | "Out of Time" | 1 | — |
| Los Bravos | 1 | "Black Is Black" | 2 | — |
| Napoleon XIV | 1 | "They're Coming to Take Me Away, Ha-Haaa!" | 4 | — |
| David and Jonathan | 1 | "Lovers of the World Unite" | 7 | — |
| Lee Dorsey | 2 | "Working in the Coal Mine" | 8 | "Holy Cow" (6) |
| The New Vaudeville Band | 1 | "Winchester Cathedral" | 4 | — |
| The Sandpipers | 1 | "Guantanamera" | 7 | — |
| Four Tops | 1 | "Reach Out I'll Be There" | 1 | — |
| Paul Jones | 1 | "High Times" | 4 | — |
| The Easybeats | 1 | "Friday on My Mind" | 6 | — |
| Jimmy Ruffin | 1 | "What Becomes of the Brokenhearted" ^{[B]} | 8 | — |

Notes

Alan Price was the original keyboardist for The Animals, leaving in 1965 after the group had broken through with two top 10 hits, including number-one single "House of the Rising Sun". He went on to have a solo career and charted with his own band The Alan Price Set in 1966.

The Merseys were an offshoot of the group The Merseybeats, created by former members Tony Crane and Billy Kinsley. "Sorrow" was their only hit single as a duo before they folded in 1968.

=== Songs from films ===
Original songs from various films entered the top 10 throughout the year. These included "Alfie" (from Alfie), "Strangers in the Night" (A Man Could Get Killed) and "Yellow Submarine" (Yellow Submarine in 1968).

Additionally, the original version of "Love Letters" was nominated for the Academy Award for Best Original Song after being used in the film of the same name (losing out to "It Might As Well Be Spring" from State Fair). "The More I See You" was first sung by Dick Haymes in the 1945 film Diamond Horseshoe.

=== Best-selling singles ===
Until 1970 there was no universally recognised year-end best-sellers list. However, in 2011 the Official Charts Company released a list of the best-selling single of each year in chart history from 1952 to date. According to the list, "Green, Green Grass of Home" by Tom Jones is officially recorded as the biggest-selling single of 1966. "Green, Green Grass of Home" (10) ranked in the top 10 best-selling singles of the decade.

== Top-ten singles ==
Key

| Symbol | Meaning |
|---|---|
| ‡ | Single peaked in 1965 but still in chart in 1966. |
| (#) | Year-end best-selling singles. |
| Entered | The date that the single first appeared in the chart. |
| Peak | Highest position that the single reached in the UK Singles Chart. |

| Entered (week ending) | Weeks in top 10 | Single | Artist | Peak | Peak reached (week ending) | Weeks at peak |
Singles in 1965
| 16 September 1965 | 17 | "Tears" ‡ | Ken Dodd | 1 | 30 September 1965 | 5 |
| 11 November 1965 | 11 | "The Carnival Is Over" ‡ | The Seekers | 1 | 25 November 1965 | 3 |
| 25 November 1965 | 9 | "Wind Me Up (Let Me Go)" ‡ | Cliff Richard | 2 | 23 December 1965 | 3 |
| 9 December 1965 | 9 | "Day Tripper"/"We Can Work It Out" ‡ | The Beatles | 1 | 16 December 1965 | 5 |
| 9 December 1965 | 8 | "The River" ‡ | Ken Dodd | 3 | 23 December 1965 | 2 |
| 16 December 1965 | 8 | "My Ship Is Comin' In" | The Walker Brothers | 3 | 20 January 1966 | 1 |
| 23 December 1965 | 7 | "Let's Hang On!" | The Four Seasons | 4 | 20 January 1966 | 1 |
Singles in 1966
| 6 January 1966 | 7 | "Keep On Running" | The Spencer Davis Group | 1 | 20 January 1966 | 1 |
| 6 January 1966 | 2 | "Merry Gentle Pops" | The Barron Knights | 9 | 6 January 1966 | 1 |
| 6 January 1966 | 5 | "Till the End of the Day" | The Kinks | 8 | 13 January 1966 | 2 |
| 13 January 1966 | 5 | "A Must to Avoid" | Herman's Hermits | 6 | 27 January 1966 | 2 |
| 20 January 1966 | 8 | "Spanish Flea" | Herb Alpert & the Tijuana Brass | 3 | 27 January 1966 | 3 |
| 27 January 1966 | 4 | "Michelle" | The Overlanders | 1 | 27 January 1966 | 3 |
| 27 January 1966 | 6 | "You Were on My Mind" | Crispian St. Peters | 2 | 10 February 1966 | 1 |
| 3 February 1966 | 4 | "Love's Just a Broken Heart" | Cilla Black | 5 | 3 February 1966 | 2 |
| 10 February 1966 | 6 | "These Boots Are Made for Walkin'" | Nancy Sinatra | 1 | 17 February 1966 | 4 |
| 10 February 1966 | 7 | "A Groovy Kind of Love" | The Mindbenders | 2 | 10 March 1966 | 1 |
| 10 February 1966 | 2 | "Mirror, Mirror" | Pinkerton's Assorted Colours | 9 | 10 February 1966 | 1 |
| 10 February 1966 | 1 | "Like a Baby" | Len Barry | 10 | 10 February 1966 | 1 |
| 17 February 1966 | 4 | "19th Nervous Breakdown" | The Rolling Stones | 2 | 17 February 1966 | 3 |
| 17 February 1966 | 2 | "Tomorrow" | Sandie Shaw | 9 | 17 February 1966 | 2 |
| 24 February 1966 | 3 | "My Love" | Petula Clark | 4 | 3 March 1966 | 1 |
| 24 February 1966 | 6 | "Sha-La-La-La-Lee" | Small Faces | 3 | 17 March 1966 | 1 |
| 24 February 1966 | 6 | "Barbara Ann" | The Beach Boys | 3 | 10 March 1966 | 1 |
| 3 March 1966 | 4 | "Backstage" | Gene Pitney | 4 | 10 March 1966 | 1 |
| 3 March 1966 | 6 | "Make the World Go Away" ^{[A]} | Eddy Arnold | 8 | 31 March 1966 | 2 |
| 10 March 1966 | 5 | "I Can't Let Go" | The Hollies | 2 | 17 March 1966 | 3 |
| 10 March 1966 | 7 | "The Sun Ain't Gonna Shine Anymore" | The Walker Brothers | 1 | 17 March 1966 | 4 |
| 17 March 1966 | 4 | "Shapes of Things" | The Yardbirds | 3 | 24 March 1966 | 2 |
| 17 March 1966 | 5 | "Dedicated Follower of Fashion" | The Kinks | 4 | 31 March 1966 | 2 |
| 24 March 1966 | 4 | "Elusive Butterfly" | Bob Lind | 5 | 31 March 1966 | 2 |
| 31 March 1966 | 4 | "Elusive Butterfly" | Val Doonican | 5 | 21 April 1966 | 1 |
| 31 March 1966 | 5 | "Somebody Help Me" | The Spencer Davis Group | 1 | 14 April 1966 | 2 |
| 7 April 1966 | 6 | "Hold Tight!" | Dave Dee, Dozy, Beaky, Mick & Tich | 4 | 14 April 1966 | 2 |
| 7 April 1966 | 6 | "The Sound of Silence" | The Bachelors | 3 | 14 April 1966 | 2 |
| 14 April 1966 | 2 | "Substitute" | The Who | 5 | 14 April 1966 | 1 |
| 14 April 1966 | 6 | "You Don't Have to Say You Love Me" | Dusty Springfield | 1 | 28 April 1966 | 1 |
| 21 April 1966 | 4 | "Bang Bang (My Baby Shot Me Down)" | Cher | 3 | 5 May 1966 | 1 |
| 21 April 1966 | 2 | "I Put a Spell on You" | The Alan Price Set | 9 | 21 April 1966 | 2 |
| 21 April 1966 | 5 | "The Pied Piper" | Crispian St. Peters | 5 | 12 May 1966 | 1 |
| 28 April 1966 | 5 | "Pretty Flamingo" | Manfred Mann | 1 | 5 May 1966 | 3 |
| 28 April 1966 | 4 | "Daydream" | The Lovin' Spoonful | 2 | 5 May 1966 | 2 |
| 28 April 1966 | 2 | "Alfie" | Cilla Black | 9 | 5 May 1966 | 1 |
| 5 May 1966 | 6 | "Sloop John B" | The Beach Boys | 2 | 19 May 1966 | 1 |
| 5 May 1966 | 2 | "Homeward Bound" | Simon & Garfunkel | 9 | 12 May 1966 | 1 |
| 12 May 1966 | 3 | "Shotgun Wedding" | Roy C | 6 | 19 May 1966 | 1 |
| 19 May 1966 | 5 | "Wild Thing" | The Troggs | 2 | 26 May 1966 | 1 |
| 19 May 1966 | 5 | "Paint It Black" | The Rolling Stones | 1 | 26 May 1966 | 1 |
| 19 May 1966 | 6 | "Sorrow" | The Merseys | 4 | 2 June 1966 | 3 |
| 19 May 1966 | 4 | "Rainy Day Women #12 & 35" | Bob Dylan | 7 | 2 June 1966 | 1 |
| 26 May 1966 | 8 | "Strangers in the Night" | Frank Sinatra | 1 | 2 June 1966 | 3 |
| 26 May 1966 | 6 | "Monday, Monday" | The Mamas & the Papas | 3 | 16 June 1966 | 2 |
| 26 May 1966 | 2 | "Hey Girl" | Small Faces | 10 | 26 May 1966 | 2 |
| 2 June 1966 | 3 | "Promises" | Ken Dodd | 6 | 9 June 1966 | 1 |
| 2 June 1966 | 6 | "When a Man Loves a Woman" | Percy Sledge | 4 | 23 June 1966 | 1 |
| 9 June 1966 | 3 | "Don't Bring Me Down" | The Animals | 6 | 23 June 1966 | 1 |
| 16 June 1966 | 5 | "Paperback Writer" | The Beatles | 1 | 23 June 1966 | 2 |
| 16 June 1966 | 2 | "Over Under Sideways Down" | The Yardbirds | 10 | 16 June 1966 | 2 |
| 23 June 1966 | 7 | "Sunny Afternoon" | The Kinks | 1 | 7 July 1966 | 2 |
| 23 June 1966 | 3 | "Don't Answer Me" | Cilla Black | 6 | 30 June 1966 | 1 |
| 23 June 1966 | 6 | "River Deep – Mountain High" | Ike & Tina Turner | 3 | 7 July 1966 | 2 |
| 30 June 1966 | 4 | "Nobody Needs Your Love" | Gene Pitney | 2 | 14 July 1966 | 1 |
| 30 June 1966 | 4 | "Bus Stop" | The Hollies | 5 | 14 July 1966 | 1 |
| 30 June 1966 | 3 | "Hideaway" | Dave Dee, Dozy, Beaky, Mick & Tich | 10 | 30 June 1966 | 3 |
| 7 July 1966 | 5 | "Get Away" | Georgie Fame and the Blue Flames | 1 | 21 July 1966 | 1 |
| 14 July 1966 | 5 | "I Couldn't Live Without Your Love" | Petula Clark | 6 | 28 July 1966 | 1 |
| 14 July 1966 | 6 | "Out of Time" | Chris Farlowe | 1 | 28 July 1966 | 1 |
| 21 July 1966 | 6 | "Black Is Black" | Los Bravos | 2 | 28 July 1966 | 1 |
| 21 July 1966 | 4 | "Love Letters" | Elvis Presley | 6 | 4 August 1966 | 1 |
| 21 July 1966 | 8 | "With a Girl Like You" | The Troggs | 1 | 4 August 1966 | 2 |
| 28 July 1966 | 5 | "The More I See You" | Chris Montez | 3 | 11 August 1966 | 1 |
| 28 July 1966 | 2 | "Goin' Back" | Dusty Springfield | 10 | 28 July 1966 | 2 |
| 4 August 1966 | 6 | "Mama" | Dave Berry | 5 | 18 August 1966 | 2 |
| 11 August 1966 | 7 | "God Only Knows" | The Beach Boys | 2 | 25 August 1966 | 2 |
| 11 August 1966 | 8 | "Yellow Submarine"/"Eleanor Rigby" | The Beatles | 1 | 18 August 1966 | 4 |
| 11 August 1966 | 3 | "Summer in the City" ^{[B]} | The Lovin' Spoonful | 8 | 18 August 1966 | 1 |
| 18 August 1966 | 3 | "Visions" | Cliff Richard | 7 | 18 August 1966 | 3 |
| 18 August 1966 | 5 | "They're Coming to Take Me Away, Ha-Haaa!" | Napoleon XIV | 4 | 25 August 1966 | 3 |
| 25 August 1966 | 6 | "All or Nothing" | Small Faces | 1 | 15 September 1966 | 1 |
| 25 August 1966 | 4 | "Lovers of the World Unite" | David and Jonathan | 7 | 8 September 1966 | 1 |
| 1 September 1966 | 6 | "Too Soon to Know" | Roy Orbison | 3 | 22 September 1966 | 1 |
| 8 September 1966 | 10 | "Distant Drums" | Jim Reeves | 1 | 22 September 1966 | 5 |
| 8 September 1966 | 3 | "Working in the Coal Mine" | Lee Dorsey | 8 | 15 September 1966 | 1 |
| 15 September 1966 | 2 | "Got to Get You into My Life" | Cliff Bennett and the Rebel Rousers | 6 | 15 September 1966 | 1 |
| 15 September 1966 | 1 | "Just Like a Woman" | Manfred Mann | 10 | 15 September 1966 | 1 |
| 22 September 1966 | 6 | "I'm a Boy" | The Who | 2 | 29 September 1966 | 1 |
| 22 September 1966 | 4 | "Little Man" | Sonny & Cher | 4 | 29 September 1966 | 1 |
| 22 September 1966 | 5 | "You Can't Hurry Love" | The Supremes | 3 | 29 September 1966 | 1 |
| 29 September 1966 | 6 | "Bend It!" | Dave Dee, Dozy, Beaky, Mick & Tich | 2 | 6 October 1966 | 2 |
| 29 September 1966 | 7 | "Winchester Cathedral" | The New Vaudeville Band | 4 | 13 October 1966 | 1 |
| 29 September 1966 | 1 | "Walk with Me" | The Seekers | 10 | 29 September 1966 | 1 |
| 6 October 1966 | 4 | "Have You Seen Your Mother, Baby, Standing in the Shadow?" | The Rolling Stones | 5 | 13 October 1966 | 1 |
| 6 October 1966 | 2 | "All I See Is You" | Dusty Springfield | 9 | 6 October 1966 | 1 |
| 6 October 1966 | 5 | "Guantanamera" | The Sandpipers | 7 | 13 October 1966 | 3 |
| 13 October 1966 | 6 | "I Can't Control Myself" | The Troggs | 2 | 27 October 1966 | 1 |
| 20 October 1966 | 7 | "Reach Out I'll Be There" | Four Tops | 1 | 27 October 1966 | 3 |
| 20 October 1966 | 6 | "Stop Stop Stop" | The Hollies | 2 | 3 November 1966 | 2 |
| 27 October 1966 | 3 | "No Milk Today" | Herman's Hermits | 7 | 3 November 1966 | 1 |
| 3 November 1966 | 5 | "High Time" | Paul Jones | 4 | 10 November 1966 | 1 |
| 3 November 1966 | 1 | "Time Drags By" | Cliff Richard & The Shadows | 10 | 3 November 1966 | 1 |
| 10 November 1966 | 5 | "Semi-Detached, Suburban Mr. James" | Manfred Mann | 2 | 17 November 1966 | 1 |
| 10 November 1966 | 7 | "Good Vibrations" | The Beach Boys | 1 | 17 November 1966 | 2 |
| 10 November 1966 | 6 | "Gimme Some Lovin'" | The Spencer Davis Group | 2 | 24 November 1966 | 1 |
| 17 November 1966 | 4 | "Holy Cow" | Lee Dorsey | 6 | 17 November 1966 | 2 |
| 17 November 1966 | 2 | "If I Were a Carpenter" | Bobby Darin | 9 | 17 November 1966 | 1 |
| 17 November 1966 | 13 | "Green, Green Grass of Home" (#1) | Tom Jones | 1 | 1 December 1966 | 7 |
| 24 November 1966 | 8 | "What Would I Be" | Val Doonican | 2 | 15 December 1966 | 1 |
| 1 December 1966 | 5 | "My Mind's Eye" ^{[C]} | Small Faces | 4 | 8 December 1966 | 2 |
| 1 December 1966 | 2 | "Just One Smile" | Gene Pitney | 8 | 8 December 1966 | 1 |
| 8 December 1966 | 9 | "Morningtown Ride" | The Seekers | 2 | 22 December 1966 | 3 |
| 8 December 1966 | 4 | "Friday on My Mind" | The Easybeats | 6 | 15 December 1966 | 1 |
| 15 December 1966 | 5 | "Dead End Street" | The Kinks | 5 | 22 December 1966 | 2 |
| 15 December 1966 | 4 | "You Keep Me Hangin' On" | The Supremes | 8 | 22 December 1966 | 2 |
| 15 December 1966 | 2 | "What Becomes of the Brokenhearted" ^{[D]} | Jimmy Ruffin | 8 | 29 December 1966 | 1 |
| 22 December 1966 | 5 | "Sunshine Superman" | Donovan | 2 | 29 December 1966 | 1 |
| 22 December 1966 | 5 | "Save Me" | Dave Dee, Dozy, Beaky, Mick & Tich | 3 | 29 December 1966 | 1 |
| 29 December 1966 | 1 | "If Every Day Was Like Christmas" | Elvis Presley | 9 | 29 December 1966 | 1 |

== Entries by artist ==
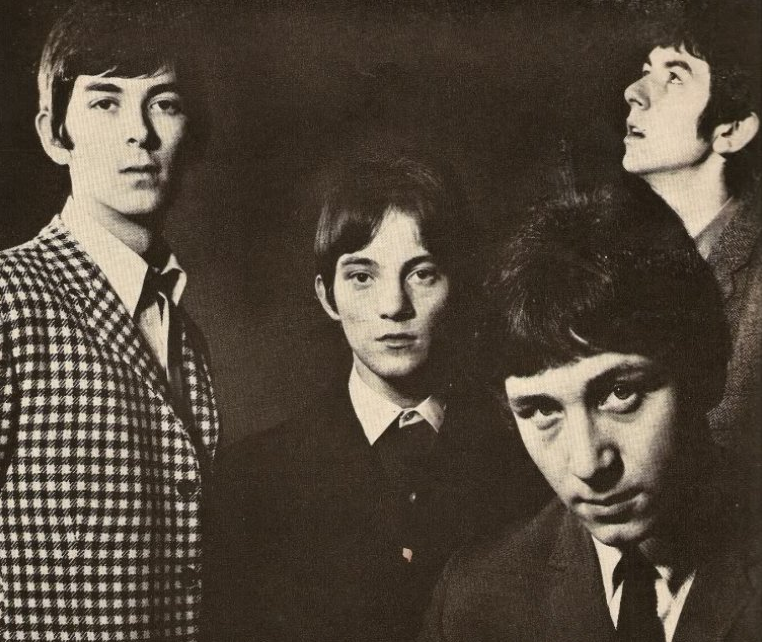
Newcomers to the UK top 10 this year were Small Faces, who secured four entries, including chart-topper "All or Nothing".

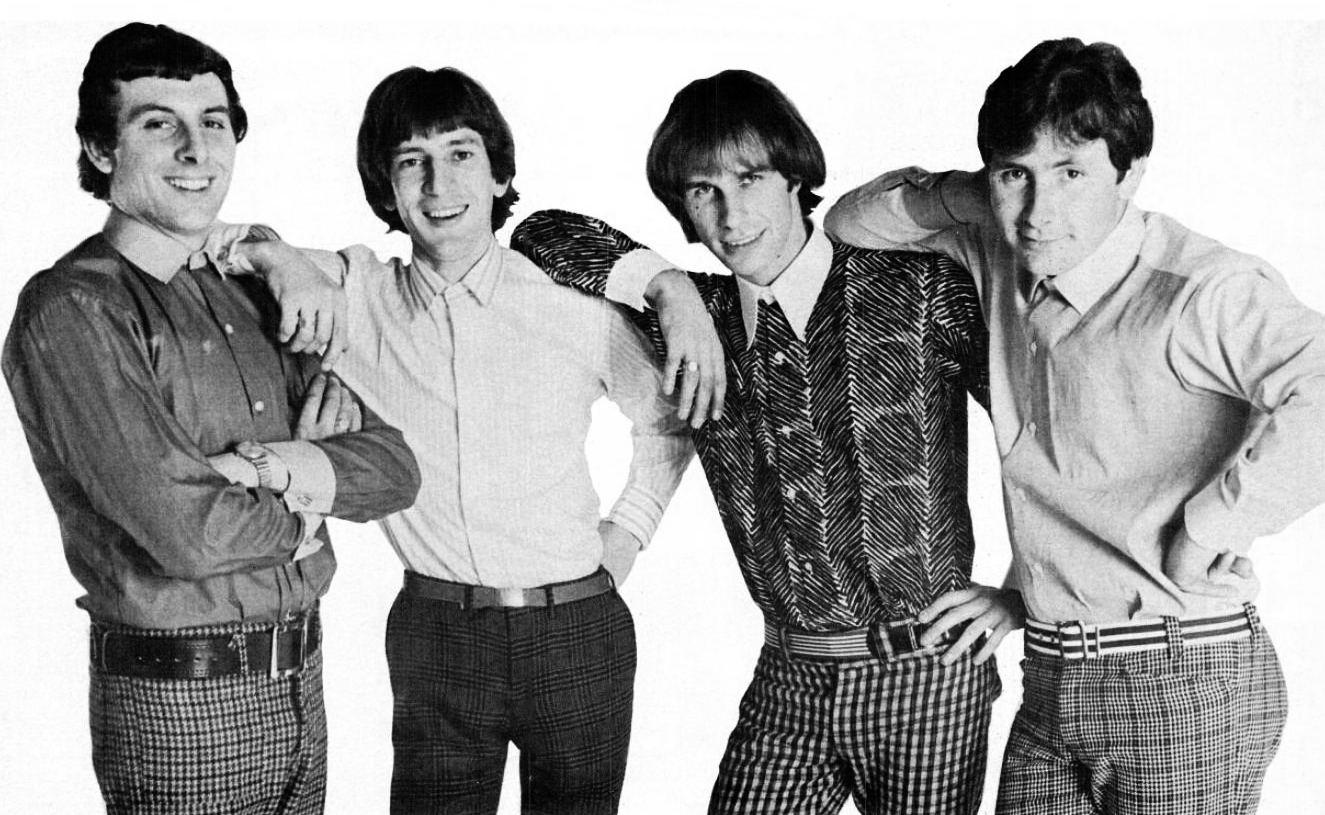
The Troggs were another British band who saw significant success in 1966, achieving three top 10 singles, including the number-one hit "With a Girl Like You".

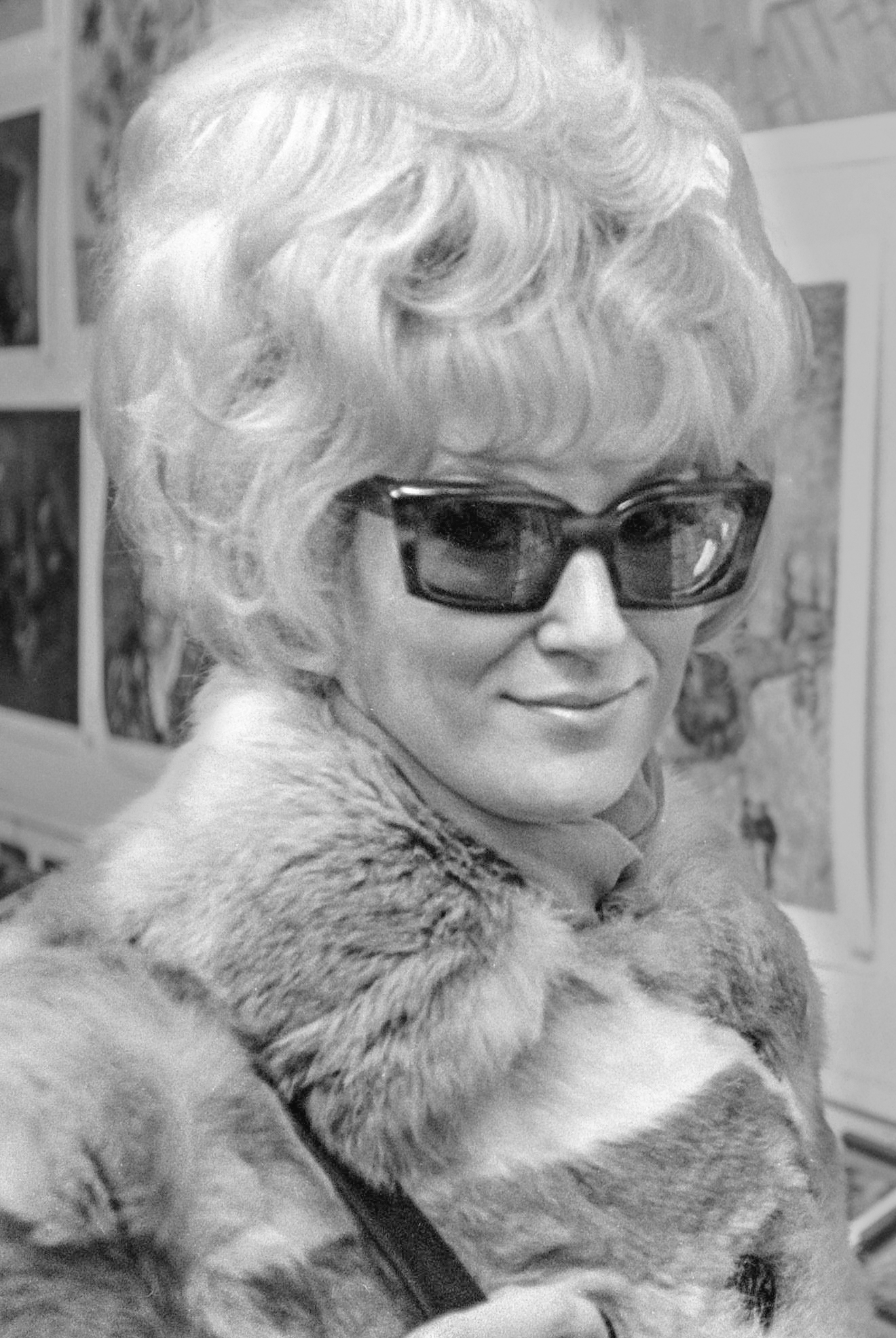
Dusty Springfield had three UK top 10 entries this year, including her only number-one single, "You Don't Have to Say You Love Me".

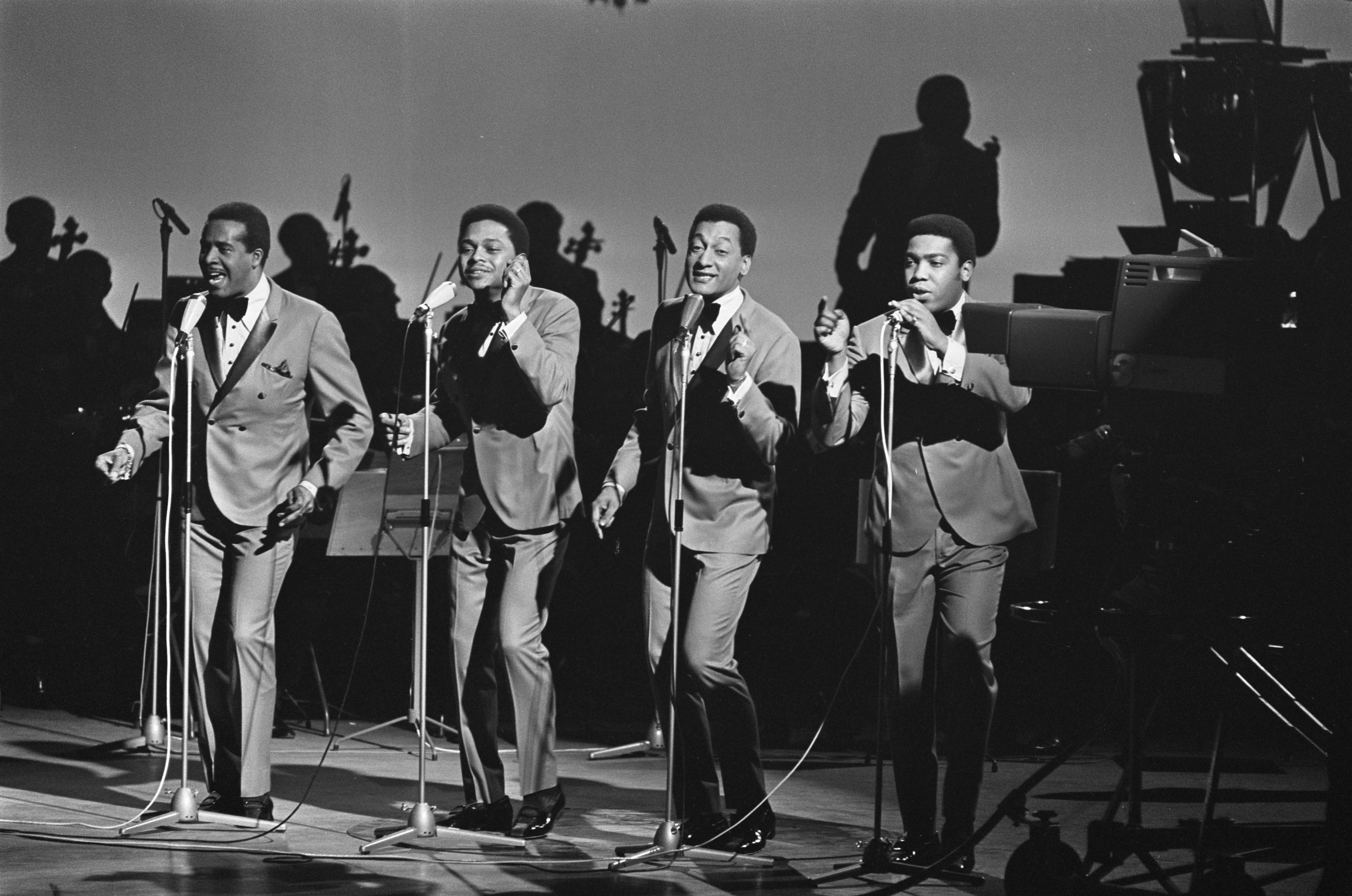
Motown legends Four Tops reached the UK top 10 for the first time in 1966 with "Reach Out I'll Be There", which spent three weeks at number-one.

The following table shows artists who achieved two or more top 10 entries in 1966, including singles that reached their peak in 1965 or 1967. The figures include both main artists and featured artists. The total number of weeks an artist spent in the top ten in 1966 is also shown.

| Entries | Artist | Weeks | Singles |
|---|---|---|---|
| 4 | The Beach Boys | 26 | "Barbara Ann", "God Only Knows", "Good Vibrations", "Sloop John B" |
| 4 | Dave Dee, Dozy, Beaky, Mick & Tich | 19 | "Bend It!", "Hideaway", "Hold Tight!", "Save Me" |
| 4 | The Kinks | 19 | "Dead End Street", "Dedicated Follower of Fashion", "Sunny Afternoon", "Till the End of the Day" |
| 4 | Small Faces | 18 | "All or Nothing", "Hey Girl", "My Mind's Eye", "Sha-La-La-La-Lee" |
| 3 | The Beatles ^{[E]} | 19 | "Day Tripper"/"We Can Work It Out", "Paperback Writer", "Yellow Submarine"/"Eleanor Rigby" |
| 3 | Cilla Black | 7 | "Alfie", "Don't Answer Me", "Love's Just a Broken Heart" |
| 3 | Cliff Richard ^{[E]} | 8 | "Time Drags By", "Visions", "Wind Me Up (Let Me Go)" |
| 3 | Dusty Springfield | 10 | "All I See Is You", "Goin' Back", "You Don't Have to Say You Love Me" |
| 3 | Gene Pitney | 10 | "Backstage", "Just One Smile", "Nobody Needs Your Love" |
| 3 | The Hollies | 15 | "Bus Stop", "I Can't Let Go", "Stop Stop Stop" |
| 3 | Ken Dodd ^{[E]} | 10 | "Promises", "Tears", "The River" |
| 3 | Manfred Mann | 11 | "Just Like a Woman", "Pretty Flamingo", "Semi-Detached, Suburban Mr. James" |
| 3 | The Rolling Stones | 13 | "19th Nervous Breakdown", "Have You Seen Your Mother, Baby, Standing in the Shadow?", "Paint It Black" |
| 3 | The Seekers ^{[E]} | 8 | "Morningtown Ride", "The Carnival Is Over", "Walk with Me" |
| 3 | The Spencer Davis Group | 18 | "Gimme Some Lovin'", "Keep on Running", "Somebody Help Me" |
| 3 | The Troggs | 19 | "I Can't Control Myself", "Wild Thing", "With a Girl Like You" |
| 2 | Cher ^{[F]} | 8 | "Bang Bang (My Baby Shot Me Down)", "Little Man" |
| 2 | Crispian St. Peters | 11 | "The Pied Piper", "You Were on My Mind" |
| 2 | Elvis Presley | 5 | "Love Letters", "If Every Day Was Like Christmas" |
| 2 | Herman's Hermits | 8 | "A Must to Avoid", "No Milk Today" |
| 2 | Lee Dorsey | 7 | "Holy Cow", "Working in the Coal Mine" |
| 2 | The Lovin' Spoonful | 7 | "Daydream", "Summer in the City" |
| 2 | Paul Jones ^{[G]} | 10 | "High Time", "Pretty Flamingo" |
| 2 | Petula Clark | 8 | "I Couldn't Live Without Your Love", "My Love" |
| 2 | The Supremes | 7 | "You Can't Hurry Love", "You Keep Me Hangin' On" |
| 2 | Val Doonican | 9 | "Elusive Butterfly", "What Would I Be" |
| 2 | The Walker Brothers ^{[H]} | 13 | "My Ship Is Comin' In", "The Sun Ain't Gonna Shine Anymore" |
| 2 | The Who | 8 | "I'm a Boy", "Substitute" |
| 2 | The Yardbirds | 6 | "Over Under Sideways Down", "Shapes of Things" |

== See also ==
- 1966 in British music
- List of number-one singles from the 1960s (UK)

== Notes ==
- ^{a} "Make the World Go Away" re-entered the top 10 at number 10 on 17 March 1966 (week ending) for 5 weeks.
- ^{b} "Summer in the City" re-entered the top 10 at number 10 on 1 September 1966 (week ending).
- ^{c} "My Mind's Eye" re-entered the top 10 at number 10 on 5 January 1967 (week ending).
- ^{d} "What Becomes of the Brokenhearted" re-entered the top 10 at number 8 on 29 December 1966 (week ending).
- ^{e} Figure includes single that peaked in 1965.
- ^{f} Figure includes appearance on "Little Man" by Sonny & Cher.
- ^{g} Figure includes appearance on "Pretty Flamingo" by Manfred Mann.
- ^{h} Figure includes single that first charted in 1965 but peaked in 1966.
