= List of number-one hits of 1966 (Germany) =

This is a list of the German Media Control Top100 Singles Chart number-ones of 1966.

Issue date	Song	Artist
1 January	"Get Off of My Cloud"	The Rolling Stones
8 January	"Get Off of My Cloud"	The Rolling Stones
15 January	"Get Off of My Cloud"	The Rolling Stones
22 January	"Marmor, Stein und Eisen bricht"	Drafi Deutscher
29 January	"Marmor, Stein und Eisen bricht"	Drafi Deutscher
5 February	"Yesterday Man"	Chris Andrews
12 February	"Yesterday Man"	Chris Andrews
19 February	"Yesterday Man"	Chris Andrews
26 February	"Yesterday Man"	Chris Andrews
5 March	"Yesterday Man"	Chris Andrews
12 March	"Ganz in Weiß"	Roy Black
19 March	"Ganz in Weiß"	Roy Black
26 March	"Ganz in Weiß"	Roy Black
2 April	"19th Nervous Breakdown"	The Rolling Stones
9 April	"19th Nervous Breakdown"	The Rolling Stones
16 April	"These Boots Are Made for Walkin'"	Nancy Sinatra
23 April	"These Boots Are Made for Walkin'"	Nancy Sinatra
30 April	"These Boots Are Made for Walkin'"	Nancy Sinatra
7 May	"These Boots Are Made for Walkin'"	Nancy Sinatra
14 May	"These Boots Are Made for Walkin'"	Nancy Sinatra
21 May	"These Boots Are Made for Walkin'"	Nancy Sinatra
28 May	"Hundert Mann und ein Befehl"	Freddy Quinn
4 June	"Hundert Mann und ein Befehl"	Freddy Quinn
11 June	"Sloop John B"	The Beach Boys
18 June	"Sloop John B"	The Beach Boys
25 June	"Sloop John B"	The Beach Boys
2 July	"Sloop John B"	The Beach Boys
9 July	"Sloop John B"	The Beach Boys
16 July	"Paperback Writer"	The Beatles
23 July	"Paperback Writer"	The Beatles
30 July	"Paperback Writer"	The Beatles
6 August	"Strangers in the Night"	Frank Sinatra
13 August	"Strangers in the Night"	Frank Sinatra
20 August	"Strangers in the Night"	Frank Sinatra
27 August	"Strangers in the Night"	Frank Sinatra
3 September	"Strangers in the Night"	Frank Sinatra
10 September	"Strangers in the Night"	Frank Sinatra
17 September	"Strangers in the Night"	Frank Sinatra
24 September	"Strangers in the Night"	Frank Sinatra
1 October	"Yellow Submarine"	The Beatles
8 October	"Yellow Submarine"	The Beatles
15 October	"Yellow Submarine"	The Beatles
22 October	"Yellow Submarine"	The Beatles
29 October	"Yellow Submarine"	The Beatles
5 November	"Bend It"	Dave Dee, Dozy, Beaky, Mick & Tich
12 November	"Bend It"	Dave Dee, Dozy, Beaky, Mick & Tich
19 November	"Bend It"	Dave Dee, Dozy, Beaky, Mick & Tich
26 November	"Bend It"	Dave Dee, Dozy, Beaky, Mick & Tich
3 December	"Bend It"	Dave Dee, Dozy, Beaky, Mick & Tich
10 December	"Bend It"	Dave Dee, Dozy, Beaky, Mick & Tich
17 December	"Bend It"	Dave Dee, Dozy, Beaky, Mick & Tich
24 December	"Dandy"	The Kinks
31 December	"Dandy"	The Kinks

== See also ==
- List of number-one hits (Germany)
