= Puppet on a String (album) =

Compilation album by Sandie Shaw
- Released: May 1967
- Recorded: 1964–1967
- Genre: Pop
- Label: Pye
- Producer: Ken Woodman

Sandie Shaw chronology
The Golden Hits of Sandie Shaw (1966)	Puppet on a String (1967)	Love Me, Please Love Me (1967)

Puppet on a String is Sandie Shaw's third full-priced album, released on the Pye label in May 1967 on the back of her Eurovision success.

The album contained two brand-new tracks alongside previously released material. It was issued on CD format for the first time in 2005 by EMI and contained several bonus tracks (see below).

== Track listing and song information ==
Side One

No.	Title	Writer(s)	Length
1.	"Puppet on a String"	Bill Martin, Phil Coulter	2:22
2.	"Think Sometimes About Me"	Chris Andrews	2:22
3.	"I Don't Think You Want Me Anymore"	Chris Andrews	2:16
4.	"Keep In Touch"	Chris Andrews	2:47
5.	"Stop Before You Start"	Chris Andrews	2:05
6.	"Hide All Emotion"	Marty Wilde	3:05

Side Two

No.	Title	Writer(s)	Length
7.	"Tell The Boys"	Peter Callander, Mitch Murray	3:00
8.	"Don't You Count On It"	Chris Andrews	2:32
9.	"No Moon"	Peter Moesser	2:30
10.	"Long Walk Home"	Chris Andrews	2:31
11.	"I'd Be Far Better Off Without You"	Chris Andrews	3:15
12.	"Had A Dream Last Night"	Chris Andrews	2:40

Side one of the Puppet on a String album begins with the title track, written by Bill Martin and Phil Coulter. They admitted to having written the song deliberately in the style of oompah band music in an attempt to curry favour in Continental Europe; for some time thereafter, British Eurovision entries would seem to be written in the style of continental European MOR or Schlager rather than other British MOR which was more similar to American MOR.

Shaw had originally performed the song as one of five prospective numbers to represent the United Kingdom in the 1967 Eurovision Song Contest on The Rolf Harris Show. She had never been taken with the idea of taking part in the contest but her discoverer, Adam Faith had talked her into it, saying it would keep her manager Eve Taylor happy. Taylor was wanting to give Shaw a more cabaret appeal and felt that this was the right move - and also felt that it would get Shaw back in the public's good books as she had recently been involved in a divorce scandal.

Of the five songs performed, "Puppet on a String" was Shaw's least favourite. In her own words "I hated it from the very first oompah to the final bang on the big bass drum. I was instinctively repelled by its sexist drivel and cuckoo-clock tune." She was disappointed when it was selected as the song she would use to represent the country. Shaw won the contest hands down, though it has always been felt that this was partly down to her existing popularity on the continent (she had recorded most of her hit singles in French, Italian, German and Spanish). As a result, "Puppet on a String" became her third Number One hit in the UK, (a record for a female at the time) and was a big worldwide smash (the biggest selling single of the year in Germany).

An EP was later released in the UK entitled "Tell The Boys" containing the other four prospective Eurovision songs after fans expressed demands for them (though the title track had been used as the B-side to the "Puppet on a String" single).

The second song on the Puppet on a String album was the ballad "Think Sometimes About Me," written by Chris Andrews who to date had written all of Shaw's singles with the exception of "(There's) Always Something There to Remind Me," "I Don't Need Anything" and "Puppet on a String". "Think Sometimes About Me" had been released as a single in late 1966 but had only made Number 32 on the UK Singles Chart, her lowest position since her breakthrough. Song number three on side one was a new Andrews composition entitled "I Don't Think You Want Me Anymore," and was followed by two more of his previously released numbers - "Keep In Touch" and "Stop Before You Start," which had been B-sides to the singles "I Don't Need Anything" and the Top 20 "Nothing Comes Easy" respectively. "Keep In Touch" was released as a single in some territories, and reached Number 1 in Singapore in March 1967. Side one finished with "Hide All Emotion" (originally the B-side to "Think Sometimes About Me"), written by Marty Wilde.

The opening song on side two is entitled "Tell The Boys" and was one of the five songs performed on The Rolf Harris show as a prospective Eurovision Song Contest representative. Shaw has since confessed that this was the song she most wanted to win. Written by Peter Callander and Mitch Murray, it was also used as the B-side to "Puppet on a String." The rest of the album consists of Andrews-written songs, firstly "Don't You Count On It," the B-side to the 1965 Top 10 hit "Message Understood," and then a new song entitled "No Moon." Next comes "Long Walk Home" (previously used as the B-side to the 1966 single "Run"), and then a brand new recording of "I'd Be Far Better Off Without You," the original version of which had been an A-side for a short time in 1964 before being switched to B-side in favour of "Girl Don't Come." The Puppet on a String album finishes with "Had A Dream Last Night," the only Andrews song performed on The Rolf Harris show as a prospective Eurovision number. Though she liked "Tell The Boys" best of the five, Shaw felt that musically this was the best song. The Hives sing a different version on The Black and White Album.

In 2006, "Puppet on a String" was used as a sample in the Lily Allen song "Alfie".

== 2005 bonus tracks ==
- "I Don't Need Anything"
- "Don't You Know"
- "I'll Cry Myself to Sleep"
- "Ask Any Woman"
- "Quel Po' Che Mi Da"
- "Nothing Comes Easy"
- "So This is Love"
- "If Ever You Need Me"

As previously mentioned the Puppet on a String album was re-issued in 2005 by EMI after Shaw licensed her recording catalogue to them. Several of her other original albums were also issued around this time and all contained bonus tracks, though in some cases this merely consisted of a couple of foreign-language versions of a couple of the songs. Puppet on a String however contained many original songs as bonus tracks, firstly "I Don't Need Anything," a 1967 single written by Paul Vance and Lee Pockriss (her first not to be written by Andrews since her breakthrough single "(There's) Always Something There to Remind Me" in 1964, and coincidentally her biggest flop since then (it only made Number 50 on the UK Singles Chart). Next on the re-issue comes "Don't You Know," an Andrews ballad, originally used back in 1964 as the B-side to the aforementioned breakthrough single. This is followed by the other two prospective Eurovision songs not found on the "main" album - "I'll Cry Myself To Sleep" written by Roger Webb and "Ask Any Woman" by James Stewart and Gerry Langley. The fifth bonus track is an Italian version of Andrews' "Don't Make Me Cry" (the B-side to the 1967 Top 20 single "You've Not Changed") entitled "Quel Po' Che Mi Da." Bonus track six is the hit single "Nothing Comes Easy," also written by Andrews which made Number 14 in 1966. Penultimate track is "So This Is Love," another exclusive song by Andrews that was recorded in late 1967 but remained unreleased until the Nothing Comes Easy box set was released in 2004. The new version of the album ends with another Andrews penned song, "If Ever You Need Me," originally the B-side to "How Can You Tell" in 1965.
