= Think It All Over =

Single by Sandie Shaw
- B-side: "Send Me A Letter"
- Released: 1969
- Genre: Pop
- Label: Pye
- Songwriter(s): Chris Andrews

Sandie Shaw singles chronology
"Monsieur Dupont" (1969)	"Think It All Over" (1969)	"Heaven Knows I'm Missing Him Now" (1969)

"Think It All Over" (1969) is the twenty-second single by the English singer Sandie Shaw. It was her final single to be written by Chris Andrews and was influenced by the German oompah bands that were popular at the time. The single peaked at number 42 in the UK Singles chart, and became Shaw's final single of the decade to chart. It was her last hit single in the UK for almost 15 years.

It also reached number four in South Africa.
