= Nothing Comes Easy =

Compilation album by Sandie Shaw
- Released: 2004
- Genre: Pop
- Label: EMI

Sandie Shaw chronology
Marionetas En La Cuerda - Sandie Shaw Canta En Español (2004)	Nothing Comes Easy (2004)	The Very Best of Sandie Shaw (2005)

Professional ratings
Review scores
Source	Rating
Allmusic	link

Nothing Comes Easy is a boxed set of four CDs by the British female singer Sandie Shaw released in 2004. It contained digitally remastered versions of every A-side and B-side of the singles she released in the UK from 1964 to 1988, plus several rare and unreleased recordings.

== Track listing ==
Disc: 1

1. "As Long As You're Happy Baby"
2. "Ya-Ya Da-Da"
3. "(There's) Always Something There To Remind Me"
4. "Don't You Know"
5. "I'd Be Far Better Off Without You"
6. "Girl Don't Come"
7. "I'll Stop At Nothing"
8. "You Can't Blame Him"
9. "Long Live Love"
10. "I've Heard About Him"
11. "Message Understood"
12. "Don't You Count On It"
13. "How Can You Tell"
14. "If Ever You Need Me"
15. "Tomorrow"
16. "Hurting You"
17. "Nothing Comes Easy"
18. "Stop Before You Start"
19. "Run"
20. "Long Walk Home"
21. "Think Sometimes About Me"
22. "Hide All Emotion"
23. "I Don't Need Anything"
24. "Keep In Touch"
25. "Puppet On A String"
26. "Tell The Boys"
27. "Tonight In Tokyo"
28. "You've Been Seeing Her Again"

Disc: 2

1. "You've Not Changed"
2. "Make Me Cry"
3. "Today"
4. "London"
5. "Don't Run Away"
6. "Stop"
7. "Show Me"
8. "One More Lie"
9. "Together"
10. "Turn On The Sunshine"
11. "Those Were The Days"
12. "Make It Go"
13. "Monsieur Dupont"
14. "Voice In The Crowd"
15. "Think It All Over"
16. "Send Me A Letter"
17. "Heaven Knows I'm Missing Him Now"
18. "So Many Things To Do"
19. "By Tomorrow"
20. "Maple Village"
21. "Wight Is Wight"
22. "That's The Way He's Made"
23. "Rose Garden"
24. "Maybe I'm Amazed"
25. "Show Your Face"
26. "Dear Madame"

Disc: 3

1. "Where Did They Go?"
2. "Look At Me"
3. "Father And Son"
4. "Pity The Ship Is Sinking"
5. "One More Night"
6. "Still So Young"
7. "Just A Disillusion"
8. "Your Mama Wouldn't Like It"
9. "Anyone Who Had A Heart"
10. "Anyone Who Had A Heart - Instrumental"
11. "Wish I Was"
12. "Life Is Like A Star"
13. "Hand In Glove"
14. "I Don't Owe You Anything"
15. "Are You Ready To Be Heartbroken?"
16. "Steven (You Don't Eat Meat)"
17. "Frederick"
18. "Go Johnny Go!"
19. "Please Help The Cause Against Loneliness"
20. "Lover Of The Century"
21. "Nothing Less Than Brilliant"
22. "I Love Peace"

Disc: 4 - Previously Unreleased Tracks & rarities

1. "As Long As You're Happy Baby"
2. "It's All Over /(Guardo Te Che Te Ne Vai)
3. "So This Is Love"
4. "Gypsy Eyes"
5. "Don't Run Away" (Early Version)
6. "Every Day"
7. "Now"
8. "Toy"
9. "Any Time, Any Place, Anywhere"
10. "I Must Be Lucky"
11. "Surround Yourself With Sorrow"
12. "I Can't Go On Living Without You"
13. "Fool On The Hill"
14. "The Comedy"
15. "It's Affecting My Mind" (Che Effetto Mi Fa)
16. "Love Is For The Two Of Us"
17. "She's Such A Beauty"
18. "Strawberry Pie"
19. "Sour Grapes"
20. "Be My Baby"
21. "Wish I Was" (Demo)
22. "Sentimental Again"
