= Hey Girl (Small Faces song) =

- Dutch picture sleeve

Single by Small Faces
- B-side: "Almost Grown"
- Released: 6 May 1966
- Recorded: March 1966
- Studio: IBC, London
- Genre: Rock, rhythm and blues, beat
- Length: 2:18
- Label: Decca
- Songwriters: Steve Marriott; Ronnie Lane
- Producer: Don Arden

Small Faces singles chronology
"Sha-La-La-La-Lee" (1966)	"Hey Girl" (1966)	"All or Nothing" (1966)

Audio
- "Hey Girl" on YouTube

"Hey Girl" is a song by the English rock band Small Faces. Released in May 1966, the song reached number ten in the UK on the Record Retailer chart.

== Background ==
"Hey Girl" was written by Steve Marriott and Ronnie Lane and was a compromise between the band and their manager, Don Arden, as Arden wanted a very commercial sounding song. Marriott biographers John Hellier and Paolo Hewitt classify "Hey Girl" as a "jaunty sing-along" and the "sound of compromise".

As with the bulk of the material that would end up on the Small Faces debut album, "Hey Girl" was recorded during one of the sessions between 22 and 25 March 1966 at IBC Studios in London, with audio engineer John Pantry. The song marked the first time Arden was credited as a producer on a Small Faces recording, which his son David reasoned was because Arden identified with his artists "doing great" and wanted to be part of it.

== Release ==
Decca Records released "Hey Girl" as the Small Faces fourth British single on 6 May 1966. It was the first of the Small Faces single A-sides to be credited solely to the songwriting duo of Marriott and Lane. During the Small Faces appearance on ITV music programme Ready Steady Go! to promote "Hey Girl" on 10 June 1966, Marriott fainted in front of the cameras towards the end of the song's performance. Hellier and Hewitt considered this incident to be a side effect of the band's hectic touring schedule.

After the success of "Hey Girl" an employee of Robert Stigwood's management company contacted the band to see where they stood. When Don Arden found out, he, along with four "heavies," visited Stigwood's London offices and Arden hung Stigwood by his legs from a balcony window and threatened violence if he interfered with his bands ever again. The story would become common knowledge around the music industry, cementing Arden's tough man reputation.

== Personnel ==
Personnel according to the 2025 re-issue of The Autumn Stone.

- Steve Marriott – lead vocals, electric guitar
- Ronnie Lane – bass guitar, vocals
- Kenney Jones – drums, percussion
- Ian McLagan – Hammond organ, celeste, vocals

== Charts ==
Weekly chart performance for "Hey Girl"
Chart (1966)	Peak position
Australia (Kent Music Report)	60
Malaysia (Radio Malaysia)	5
Singapore (Radio Singapore)	6
UK (Disc and Music Echo)	9
UK (New Musical Express)	12
UK (Melody Maker)	6
UK (Record Retailer)	10

== See also ==
- Small Faces discography

== Sources ==
- Badman, Keith; Rawlings, Terry (1997). Quite Naturally the Small Faces: A Day by Day Guide to the Career of a Pop Group (1st ed.). United Kingdom: Cherry Red. ISBN 978-095-1720-66-0. OCLC 53709166.
- Caiger, Rob (2025). The Autumn Stone (CD). United Kingdom: Immediate. IMCD0102.
- Hellier, John; Hewitt, Paolo (2004). Steve Marriott: All Too Beautiful (1st ed.). United Kingdom: Helter Skelter. ISBN 1-900924-44-7. OCLC 936670338 – via Internet Archive.
- Kent, David (2005). Australian Chart Book 1940–1969. Australia: Australian Chart Book. ISBN 0-646-44439-5. OCLC 62561852.
- Spence, Simon (2021). All Or Nothing: The Authorized Story of Steve Marriott (1st ed.). United Kingdom: Omnibus Press. ISBN 978-1-787601-84-0. OCLC 1385300209 – via Internet Archive.
