= You've Not Changed =

Single by Sandie Shaw
- B-side: "Don't Make Me Cry"
- Released: 1967
- Genre: Pop
- Label: Pye
- Songwriter(s): Chris Andrews

Sandie Shaw singles chronology
"Tonight in Tokyo" (1967)	"You've Not Changed" (1967)	"Today" (1968)

"You've Not Changed" is the fifteenth single by the British singer Sandie Shaw. This was the first single A-side to be written by Chris Andrews since "Think Sometimes About Me" almost a year previously. Shaw feels that at the time this was her best single for some time, and it reached number 18 on the UK Singles Chart, making it her ninth Top 20 single there.
