= Chris Andrews (singer) =

British-German singer-songwriter

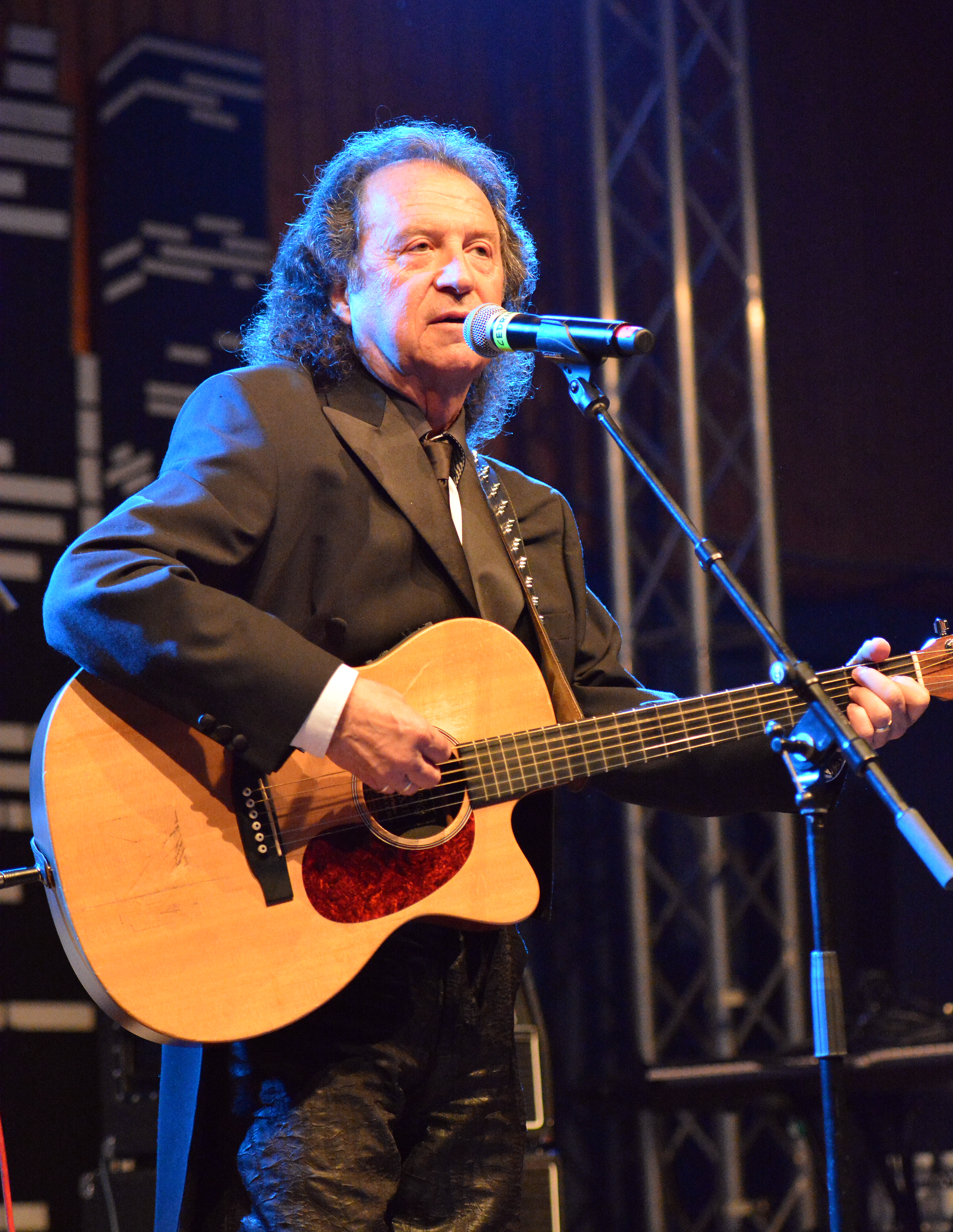
- Andrews performing in 2014

Background information
- Born: Christopher Frederick Andrews; 15 October 1942 (age 84)
- Origin: Romford, Essex, England
- Genre: Pop
- Occupations: Singer; songwriter; record producer
- Instruments: Vocals; guitar
- Years active: 1950s–present
- Labels: Decca; Vogue Schallplatten
- Website: chris-andrews.net

Christopher Frederick Andrews (born 15 October 1942) is a British-German singer-songwriter and producer whose musical career started in the late 1950s. His biggest hits as a solo artist include "To Whom It Concerns", "Yesterday Man" (a UK no. 3) and "Pretty Belinda". Between 1965 and 1970, across five countries, he reached number one thirteen times, with five songs. .

Andrews wrote for many artists, notably fifteen songs for Sandie Shaw, including "As Long as You're Happy Baby", "Don't Run Away", "Girl Don't Come", "I'll Stop At Nothing", "Long Live Love", "Message Understood", "Nothing Comes Easy", "Run", "Show Me", "Think It All Over", "Today", "Tomorrow" and "You've Not Changed".

== Career ==
=== Early career and songwriting ===
When Andrews was in his mid teens, he had formed his own group, Chris Ravel and the Ravers. One of the records made by the Ravers, which according to Andrews probably only sold around five copies, is said to have been purchased by Bill Wyman of The Rolling Stones. On 14 March 1959, he made his British television debut, performing on the Oh, Boy! show. He would later return in April to perform a cover of Cliff Richard's, "Move It".

For Adam Faith, Andrews wrote "The First Time" (UK no. 5, 1963) and "We Are in Love" (no. 11, 1964). A string of hits for Sandie Shaw followed, including three Top Tens — "Girl Don't Come" (no. 3, 1964/65), "I'll Stop at Nothing" (no. 4, 1965) and "Message Understood" (no. 6, 1965) — and "Long Live Love", which in 1965 remained at number one for three weeks in the UK. "Girl Don't Come" was covered by Cher on her debut album, All I Really Want to Do.

As a songwriter, Andrews has also written "I'll Remember Tonight" for the Roulettes, also recorded by pre-Mamas and Papas group The Mugwumps, "Our Love Has Gone" for The Fortunes and "Heart of Stone" for Suzi Quatro.

=== Solo career ===
Also in 1965, Andrews as a solo artist, reached no. 3 in the UK with the single "Yesterday Man", which peaked in Germany at number one for four weeks; followed up with a no. 13 hit in the UK "To Whom It Concerns". The instrumental section of this song was used as the theme for RTÉ's long-running TV programme, The Late Late Show, until 1999, and a re-arranged version returned as the show's theme music in September 2009. As well as obtaining a high placing in the UK chart, "Yesterday Man" climbed to number one in Ireland and Germany. It sold over one million copies, and was awarded a gold disc.

Later releases by Andrews were not as successful, but his own hits are seen as early examples of bluebeat influenced white pop music. Although his chart appearances dwindled in Britain by 1966, his chart topping success continued in mainland Europe for a number of years, particularly in Germany, and Andrews often recorded in foreign languages. It is possible that Chris Andrews' huge success in Germany was connected to the fact that his two UK hits, at least, were rhythmically redolent of Oom-pah music (although not intentionally so; see above), thus making them more acceptable to older German audiences who would not have liked many of the other Anglophone songs which became hits there.

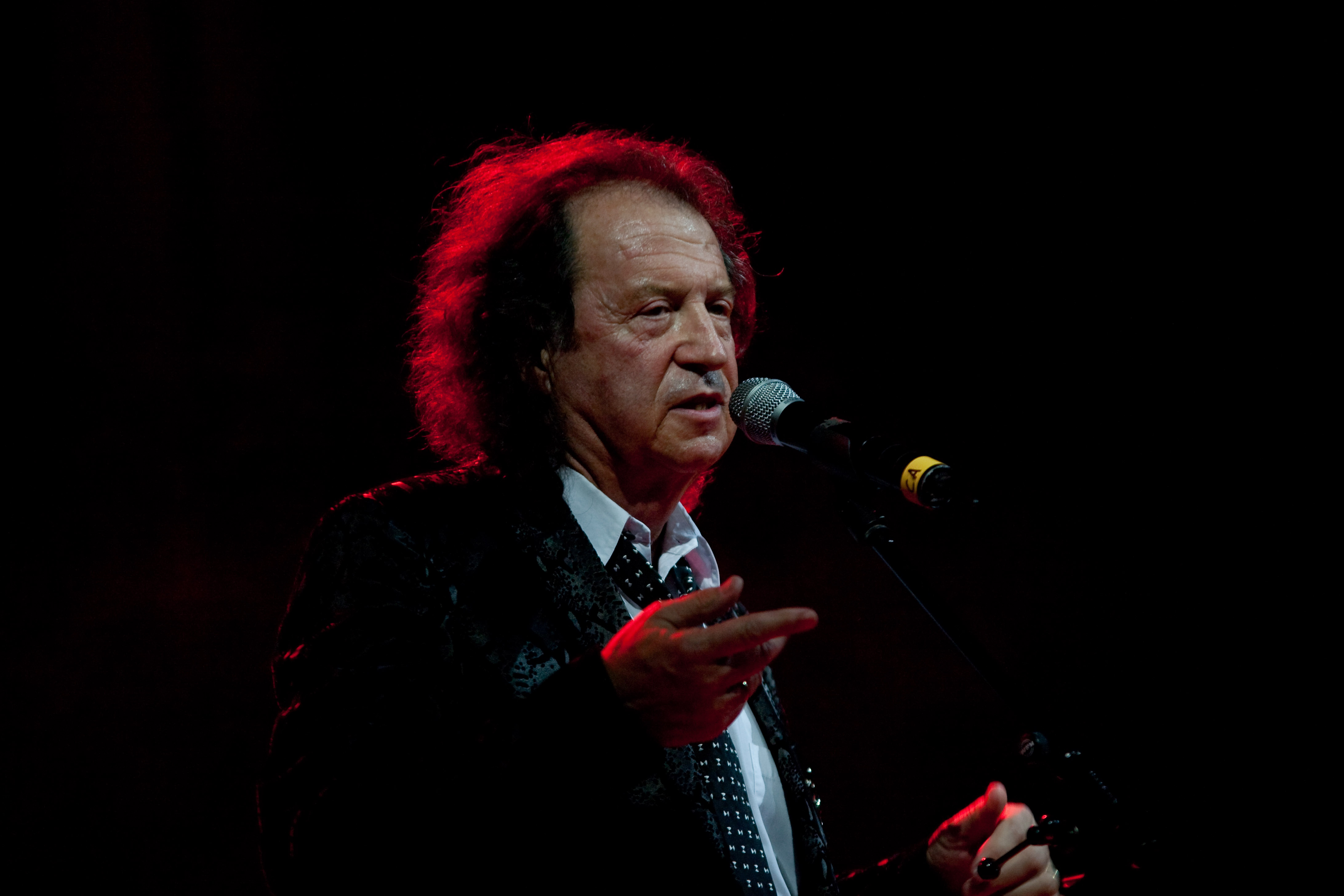
Andrews on stage in 2010

In South Africa, his later single releases proved particularly popular, with "Pretty Belinda" (1969) and the 1970 45s "Carol OK" and "Brown Eyes" all topping the charts there. "Yo Yo" reached no. 7 at the end of 1970. Throughout the 70s and 80s, Andrews worked mainly as a record producer. Those same four songs all went to number one in Zimbabwe, where surprisingly, Andrews had the most number one singles in any country.

Between 2009 and 2013, he released three songs in collaboration with Tobee. These include "Pretty Belinda – Schlauchboot" (2009), "Pretty Belinda – Skilift" (2010) and "White Christmas" (2013). "Pretty Belinda – Schlauchboot" went to 58 on German charts, marking the first time he was on any music chart since 1970 with "Yo Yo".

Andrews remains active in his career as a singer-songwriter, working primarily in Germany, continental Europe and in the United Kingdom.

== Personal life ==
Andrews was born Christopher Frederick Andrews in Romford, Essex, England. He learned how to play the piano at age five, and switched from blues music to rock and roll at the age of twelve. Inspired by Lonnie Donegan, he also learned how to play the guitar.

He lives with his second wife Alexandra, who is also his manager, in Selm, Germany, and Mallorca. Because of the Brexit vote, he obtained German and Bolivian citizenship in 2016.

== Songwriting credits ==
- "To Whom It Concerns" – Keith
- "Groovy Baby 1969
- "As Long as You're Happy Baby" – Sandie Shaw
- "Come Closer" – Adam Faith
- "Don't Run Away" – Sandie Shaw
- "The First Time" – Adam Faith
- "Girl Don't Come" – Sandie Shaw
- "Heart of Stone" – Suzi Quatro
- "Here's Another Day" – Adam Faith
- "How Can You Tell" – Sandie Shaw
- "If Ever You Need Me" - Sandie Shaw
- "I'll Remember Tonight" – Roulettes and Mugwumps
- "I'll Stop at Nothing" – Sandie Shaw
- "Long Live Love" – Sandie Shaw
- "Message Understood" – Sandie Shaw
- "Nothing Comes Easy" – Sandie Shaw
- "Nothing Less than Brilliant" – Sandie Shaw
- "Our Love Has Gone" – The Fortunes
- "Run" – Sandie Shaw
- "Show Me" – Sandie Shaw
- "Think It All Over" – Sandie Shaw
- "Think Sometimes About Me" – Sandie Shaw
- "Today" – Sandie Shaw
- "Tomorrow" – Sandie Shaw
- "We Are in Love" – Adam Faith
- "You Don't Love Me" – The Roulettes
- "You've Not Changed" – Sandie Shaw

== Discography ==
=== Albums ===
- Sings Chris Andrews (1970)

=== Extended plays ===
- Ton jour de chance (1965)
- Yesterday Man (1965)
- Lady, Oh Lady (1966)
- Merci cherie (1966)
- Stop That Girl (1966)
- Is Anybody Listening (1967)
- That's What She Said (1967)

=== Singles ===
Title	Year	Peak chart positions													
Title	Year	UK	AUS	AUT	BE (FLA)	BE (WA)	CAN	GER	IRE	NL	NOR	NZ	SA	US	ZIM
"I Do" (as Chris Ravel and the Ravers)	1963	—	—	—	—	—	—	—	—	—	—	—	—	—	—
"Someone's Taken Maria Away" (with Adam Faith and the Roulettes)	1965	34	—	—	—	—	—	—	—	—	—	—	—	—	—
"Yesterday Man"	1965	3	12	1	2	9	1	1	1	2	5	2	1	94	2
"To Whom It Concerns"	1965	13	11	9	4	45	—	3	9	3	—	4	4	—	3
"Something on My Mind"	1966	41	—	—	—	—	—	—	—	—	—	20	—	—	—
"What'cha Gonna Do Now"	1966	40	—	—	—	—	—	—	—	—	—	—	—	—	—
"Stop That Girl"	1966	36	—	—	—	—	—	31	—	—	—	—	—	—	—
"That's What She Said"	1966	—	—	—	—	—	—	—	—	—	—	—	—	—	—
"You're Gonna Like This" (Germany-only release)	1967	—	—	—	—	—	—	—	—	—	—	—	—	—	—
"I'll Walk to You"	1967	—	—	—	—	—	—	—	—	—	—	—	—	—	—
"Hold On"	1967	—	—	—	—	—	—	—	—	—	—	—	—	—	—
"The Man with the Red Balloon"	1968	—	—	—	—	—	—	—	—	—	—	—	—	—	—
"Pretty Belinda"	1969	—	—	1	—	—	—	5	—	8	3	10	1	—	1
"Carole OK"	1969	—	—	5	—	—	—	18	—	—	—	—	1	—	1
"Maker of Mistakes" (Netherlands-only release)	1970	—	—	—	—	—	—	—	—	—	—	—	—	—	—
"Brown Eyes" (Germany and South Africa-only release)	1970	—	—	—	—	—	—	—	—	—	—	—	1	—	1
"Yo Yo"	1970	—	—	4	—	—	—	—	—	—	—	—	7	—	1
"Lovely Lorraine" (as Tony Sumner; Germany-only release)	1971	—	—	—	—	—	—	—	—	—	—	—	—	—	—
"Michigan River" (Germany and Sweden-only release)	1971	—	—	—	—	—	—	—	—	—	—	—	—	—	—
"Seltsam sind die Wege der Liebe" (Germany-only release)	1971	—	—	—	—	—	—	—	—	—	—	—	—	—	—
"Maybe You're the Love of My Life" (Sweden-only release)	1971	—	—	—	—	—	—	—	—	—	—	—	—	—	—
"Hallo Lovely Lorraine" (as Tony Sumner; Germany-only release)	1972	—	—	—	—	—	—	—	—	—	—	—	—	—	—
"Lazy Days" (Germany-only release)	1972	—	—	—	—	—	—	—	—	—	—	—	—	—	—
"Sugar Daddy" (Germany, Austria and Spain-only release)	1973	—	—	—	—	—	—	—	—	—	—	—	—	—	—
"I Love Ya" (Germany and Spain-only release)	1973	—	—	—	—	—	—	—	—	—	—	—	—	—	—
"Do You Wanna Love Me" (Germany-only release)	1974	—	—	—	—	—	—	—	—	—	—	—	—	—	—
"Rainstorm"	1977	—	—	—	—	—	—	—	—	—	—	—	—	—	—
"The Girls of Brazil" (Germany and Netherlands-only release)	1985	—	—	—	—	—	—	—	—	—	—	—	—	—	—
"Let Go!" (Netherlands-only release)	1988	—	—	—	—	—	—	—	—	—	—	—	—	—	—
"Get Up and Party" (Germany-only release)	1993	—	—	—	—	—	—	—	—	—	—	—	—	—	—
"Pretty Belinda – Schlauchboot" (with Tobee)	2009	—	—	75	—	—	—	58	—	—	—	—	—	—	—
"Pretty Belinda – Skilift" (with Tobee)	2010	—	—	—	—	—	—	97	—	—	—	—	—	—	—
"Take Me to the Limit" (with Leticia)	2011	—	—	—	—	—	—	—	—	—	—	—	—	—	—
"Life in England"	2012	—	—	—	—	—	—	—	—	—	—	—	—	—	—
"White Christmas" (with Tobee)	2013	—	—	—	—	—	—	—	—	—	—	—	—	—	—
"Die Nacht ist da zum Feiern" (with Guido Westermann)	2014	—	—	—	—	—	—	—	—	—	—	—	—	—	—
"Never Miss the Water"	2015	—	—	—	—	—	—	—	—	—	—	—	—	—	—
"—" denotes releases that did not chart or were not released in that territory.

== See also ==
- List of artists under the Decca Records label
- Number 1 Singles in Ireland 1965
- List of artists who reached number one in Ireland
- Number-one hits of 1966 (Germany)
- List of performances on Top of the Pops
