= Heaven Knows I'm Missing Him Now =

1969 single by Sandie Shaw

Single by Sandie Shaw
- B-side: "So Many Things to Do"
- Released: September 12, 1969
- Genre: Pop
- Label: Pye
- Songwriters: Tony Macaulay, John Macleod
- Producer: Eve Taylor

Sandie Shaw singles chronology
"Think It All Over" (1969)	"Heaven Knows I'm Missing Him Now" (1969)	"By Tomorrow" (1970)

"Heaven Knows I'm Missing Him Now" is the twenty-third single by 1960s British singer Sandie Shaw, and her final single of that decade, marking the end of a string of singles which had made her the most successful British female singer of that era.

Although the song failed to enter the UK chart, it would later influence 1980s singer Morrissey, a big fan of Shaw, to write a song for his band The Smiths entitled "Heaven Knows I'm Miserable Now", which became one of their biggest hits.
