= Monsieur Dupont =

Single by Sandie Shaw
- B-side: "Voice In The Crowd"
- Released: 1969
- Genre: Pop
- Label: Pye
- Songwriters: Christian Bruhn and Peter Callander

Sandie Shaw singles chronology
"Those Were the Days" (1968)	"Monsieur Dupont" (1969)	"Think It All Over" (1969)

Official audio
- "Monsieur Dupont" on YouTube

"Monsieur Dupont" is the twenty-first single by British singer Sandie Shaw. Originally sung by the German singer Manuela in 1967, Shaw's version, written by Christian Bruhn and Peter Callander became her last big hit of the 1960s.

It reached number six in the UK Singles Chart in 1969, making it her eighth and final top 10 hit single. It also reached number six in South Africa in March 1969. On the New Zealand Listener charts it reached number two.

Shaw performed the song on BBC's Top of the Pops on 30 January 1969, introduced by Stuart Henry.

The song was a hit in Quebec with a French version by Les Milady's.
