= Yesterday Man =

Single by Chris Andrews
- B-side: "Too Bad You Don't Want Me"
- Released: 17 September 1965
- Genre: Pop; ska; reggae
- Length: 2'20"
- Label: Decca F11536
- Songwriter: Chris Andrews
- Producer: Ken Woodman

Chris Andrews singles chronology
"Someone's Taken Maria Away" (6.1965)	"Yesterday Man" (1965)	"To Whom It Concerns" (11.1965)

Performance video
- "Yesterday Man" on Beat Club on YouTube

"Yesterday Man" is a song written by Chris Andrews and was his first single as a solo singer, released on 17 September 1965. It climbed to No. 3 in the UK Singles Chart, and No. 1 in Ireland,, Germany, and Austria. In England it sold 20,000 copies in its first day. After a visit to England in September 1965, Jerry Wexler made a deal for Atco Records to release the single in the United States. In the US, it reached No. 94 in 1966. The Cash Box trade paper reported in its 5 February 1966 issue that it had passed 300,000 sales in Germany alone, and later over 800,000 as a final tally in that country (28 May 1966). Additionally, Andrews was awarded a silver disc for 250,000 sales of the single in the UK.

== Reception ==
In a contemporary review of the song, the Evening Sentinel wrote how: "Why write hits for Adam and Sandie all the time? says Andrews and sounds quite good on his own", further deeming it to be "Blue-beatish and good." In 2014, Spin included the song in their list of "25 Major Moments in White Reggae History"; in the accompanying write-up, writer Chris Martins deemed it "the birth of White Reggae" and highlighted how the song "made [Andrews'] heart pitter and patter to an island riddim". Mario Villanueva of The Greenville News included the song in a list of twelve exemplary "cod-reggae" songs.

Reggae Mint of UDiscover Music wrote that the "ska-styled solo hit" was a musical predecessor to the Beatles' song "Ob-La-Di, Ob-La-Da" (1968). Andrews' brass-heavy hit was also a partial inspiration for the oom-pah arrangement written by Johnny Marr for the Smiths' song "Frankly Mr. Shankly" (1986).

A German-language version was also recorded. Named "Alles tuʼ ich für dich", it was released on the label Deutsche Vogue.

== Robert Wyatt version ==
In 1974, the song was covered by Robert Wyatt (with production by Nick Mason) as the follow-up to his hit with Neil Diamond's "I'm a Believer" (released on Virgin Records). However, it was never officially released, due to Virgin head Richard Branson deeming the version "a bit too gloomy". In 1992, Wyatt recalled: "I did 'Yesterday Man', a major-key, upbeat, jolly pseudo-reggae thing. I bent all the chords out of shape and did the whole thing kind of sideways. And I was so happy with that. They said, 'We're not putting this out. It's too lugubrious.' I thought, 'That must be good,' but I got a dictionary, and it's not."

According to Wyatt in an interview with Uncut, "We never pretended to be reggae but it was obviously influenced by that feel, which was very much the heartbeat of London around that time." Richard Cook of Mojo deemed the Wyatt version to be "heartbreakingly desolate and a complete antithesis to Chris Andrew's original". Charles Shaar Murray of NME wrote: "Where Andrews' original was aggressively petulant, Wyatt's is wistfully surreal", noting that the musician performs the song "on assorted bits of percussion (including a bass-drum whomped by hand) and what sounds like a harmonium, but plays around the beat while the main rhythmic push comes from Windo and Feza."

== Chart performance ==
=== Weekly charts ===
Chart (1965–1966)	Peak position
Austria (Disc Parade)	1
Australia (Kent Music Report)	12
Belgium (Ultratop 50 Flanders)	2
Belgium (Ultratop 50 Wallonia)	9
Canada (RPM)	1
Denmark (Danmarks Radio)	2
Finland (Mitä Suomi soittaa)	29
France (SNEP)	11
Ireland (RTÉ)	1
Malaysia (Radio Malaysia)	9
Netherlands (Dutch Top 40)	8
Netherlands (Single Top 100)	2
New Zealand (Lever Hit Parade)	2
Norway (VG-lista)	5
South Africa (Springbok Radio)	1
Sweden (Kvällstoppen)	1
Sweden (Tio i Topp)	1
Switzerland (Schweizer Hitparade)	6
Rhodesia (Lyons Maid)	1
UK (Disc Weekly)	2
UK (Melody Maker)	2
UK (New Musical Express)	2
UK (Record Retailer)	3
US Billboard Hot 100	94
US Cash Box Top 100	85
US Record World 100 Top Pops	80
West Germany (Media Control)	1

=== Year-end charts ===
Chart (1965)	Peak position
Belgium (Ultratop 50 Flanders)	33
UK (Record Retailer)	33

Chart (1966)	Peak position
Austria (Disc Parade)	3
Belgium (Ultratop 50 Flanders)	26
Netherlands (Dutch Top 40)	81
South Africa (Springbok Radio)	13
West Germany (Media Control)	7
