= Tears (1930 song) =

1930 popular music song

Single by Ken Dodd

from the album Tears of Happiness
- B-side: "You and I"
- Released: August 1965
- Genre: Easy listening; pop
- Length: 2:52
- Label: Columbia DB 7659
- Songwriters: Billy Uhr, Frank Capano
- Producer: Norman Newell

Ken Dodd singles chronology
"So Deep is the Night" (1964)	"Tears" (1965)	"The River" (1965)

"Tears" (also known as "Tears for Souvenirs") is a song written by lyricist Frank Capano and composer Billy Uhr, which was popularised by Rudy Vallée in 1930. It was later made famous in a version recorded by Ken Dodd, released as a 45 rpm single in 1965, which became a bestselling No. 1 hit in the UK Singles Chart.

== Song synopsis ==
The main theme is based on Delilah's aria "Mon cœur s'ouvre à ta voix" ("Softly awakes my heart") from Act II of Camille Saint-Saëns's opera Samson and Delilah, which dates from 1877.

== Background ==
The song "Tears" was first published on October 20, 1930. The Bob Haring Orchestra recorded it on December 4. A notable early recording of it was by Rudy Vallée and His Connecticut Yankees, as a waltz, in New York on December 7 that year. Subsequent American recordings that month were by Sleepy Hall and his Collegians (the Brunswick Studio Orchestra), Mickie Alpert and his Orchestra, Seger Ellis, and the Blue Grass Boys with Lee Morse. 1931 saw recordings of the song by the Dick Robertson Orchestra with Ray Raymond, Lester McFarland and Robert A. Gardner, and the Lionel Belasco Orchestra.

In the UK, "Tears" was recorded in early 1931 by a number of British dance bands: Lew Sylva and his Band (a pseudonym for Harry Bidgood, with vocals by Bob and Alf Pearson), Bert and John Firman, The Ambassador Club Band (directed by Eddie Grossbart, with vocals by Sam Browne), Jock McDermott and his Band, Jack Payne and his BBC Dance Orchestra (with vocals by Val Rosing), and the Radio Dance Orchestra.

== Music charts ==
Although best known as a comedian, Ken Dodd was a prolific recording artist throughout the 1960s, and most of his music recordings were serious, not comic. His debut single "Love is like a Violin" reached No. 8 in 1960. Between that and "Tears", he released nine further singles, several of which charted (though none of them made the top 20). Dodd's revival of "Tears", featuring the Mike Sammes Singers, first reached the UK Singles Chart in September 1965.

The single spent 24 weeks in total on the chart, with five of those at No. 1. It sold over 1,000,000 copies in the UK, becoming the biggest-selling single of 1965 in the UK, and was the third-biggest selling single of the 1960s; it was the only non-Beatles song in the top 5. In 2017, it was listed as the UK's 39th-best selling single of all time (82nd with streaming), with sales of 1,523,690.

Dodd's recording also reached No. 1 on the Irish Singles Chart.

== Cover versions ==
Bobby Vinton released a cover of the song in 1966. His version reached No. 59 on the Billboard Hot 100, while reaching No. 27 on the Billboard Easy Listening chart. In Canada, Vinton's version reached No. 24 on the "RPM Play Sheet" and No. 14 on RPM's "GMP Guide".

== Parody versions ==
"Tears" was parodied in a section of the song "I'm Bored" by the Bonzo Dog Doo-Dah Band on their album Gorilla (1967).
