= Long Live Love (Chris Andrews song) =

Single by Sandie Shaw
- B-side: "I've Heard About Him"
- Released: 1965
- Genre: Pop; calypso; baião
- Length: 2:40
- Label: Pye 7N 15841
- Songwriter: Chris Andrews
- Producer: Chris Andrews

Sandie Shaw singles chronology
"I'll Stop at Nothing" (1965)	"Long Live Love" (1965)	"Message Understood" (1965)

"Long Live Love" is a Chris Andrews composition which, in 1965, gained Sandie Shaw the second of her three UK number one hit singles.

== In the UK ==
"Long Live Love" spent three weeks at No. 1 in the UK in June 1965, also giving Shaw a No. 1 hit in both Ireland and New Zealand, with a No. 2 peak attained in South Africa. A top ten hit in both the Netherlands (No. 7) and Norway (No. 8), "Long Live Love" was also a hit in Australia (No. 12) and Belgium, reaching No. 15 on the latter territory's Dutch language chart.

According to writer Patricia Juliana Smith, "Long Live Love" was "arguably the last big calypso hit to top the British charts", as it was released when the genre was losing popularity in the UK. Gramophone considered it be one of several contemporary hits with baião beat, alongside Unit 4 + 2's "Concrete and Clay" and Tom Jones' "It's Not Unusual". Tom Ewing of Freaky Trigger highlights the song's connection between both genres, believing it to cross the horn work of "It's Not Unusual" with a modest calypso feel.

== International ==
The original English-language version of "Long Live Love" was a substantial hit in Canada, peaking at No. 6; and in Australia, where it hit No. 12. In the US, "Long Live Love" received enough regional attention to return Shaw to the Billboard Hot 100 for the third and last time, peaking at No. 97 the week of 26 June 1965. Billboard described the song as a "happy rhythm hand-clapper with good dance beat."

In France, Shaw reached No. 5 with lyricist Georges Liferman's rendering of "Long Live Love" entitled "Pourvu Que Ça Dure"; at the same time the original "Long Live Love" reached No. 32 on the French charts. Shaw also recorded "Long Live Love" for the market in Germany as "Du weißt nichts von deinem Glück"; both the German rendition and English original reached the German top 30, their respective peaks being No. 25 ("Du weißt nichts...") and No. 28 ("Long Live Love"). The German-language version charted higher in Austria (No. 3). In 1966, Shaw made a belated Italian rendering of "Long Live Love" entitled "Viva l’amore con te". However the track was relegated to the B-side of "E ti avrò", a recording of the even older "Girl Don't Come", which reached No. 11 on the Italian chart.

Also in 1966, Shaw rendered "Long Live Love" as "¡Viva el amor!" for an EP released in Spain which also featured renderings of Shaw's UK hits "Girl Don't Come", "Message Understood" and "Tomorrow".

== Other versions ==
Besides Sandie Shaw's own non-English renderings of "Long Live Love", the song was recorded in 1965 as "Kiva, kiva rakkaus" by Marion Rung, "Leve kärleken" by Lill-Babs and "Viva el amor" by Gelu.

In 1992, Nick Berry recorded "Long Live Love" to be the follow-up single to his hit version of the theme from the TV series Heartbeat; Berry's version of "Long Live Love", which was featured in the Heartbeat series, reached No. 47 on the UK Singles Chart.

"Long Live Love" has also been recorded by its composer Chris Andrews, as well as Tracey Ullman and Jessica Andersson on her 2009 album, Wake Up.

There is no connection between the Chris Andrews composition and the Olivia Newton-John song of the same title which served as the 1974 Eurovision entry for the UK.

Shaw's original version was featured in Mike Figgis' 1999 film The Loss of Sexual Innocence.

== Charts ==
Chart (1965)	Peak position
Australia	12
Austria	3
Belgium (Flanders)	15
Belgium (Walloon)	17
Canada	6
France	5
Germany	28
Ireland	1
Netherlands	7
New Zealand	1
Norway	8
South Africa	2
United Kingdom	1
US Billboard Hot 100	97
