= Girl Don't Come =

Single by Sandie Shaw
- B-side: "I'd Be Far Better Off Without You"
- Released: 1964
- Genre: Pop
- Length: 2:13
- Label: Pye (U.K.); Reprise (U.S.)
- Songwriter: Chris Andrews

Sandie Shaw singles chronology
| "(There's) Always Something There to Remind Me" (1964) | "Girl Don't Come" (1964) | "I'll Stop at Nothing" (1965) |

"Girl Don't Come" is a song, written by Chris Andrews that was a No. 3 UK hit in the UK Singles Chart for Sandie Shaw in 1964–65.

== Background ==
The track was recorded at Pye Recording Studios in Marble Arch in a session whose personnel included guitarists Big Jim Sullivan and Vic Flick.

Originally envisioned as a ballad, "Girl Don't Come" was ultimately recorded at the tempo of Shaw's first hit "(There's) Always Something There to Remind Me". Shaw disliked this arrangement of the song and had to be persuaded to record it, preferring that it be relegated to the B-side of another track, the Chris Andrews ballad "I'd Be Far Better Off Without You". Shaw's manager Evelyn Taylor favoured "Girl Don't Come" but acquiesced to Shaw's wishes. However, when Shaw performed both songs on a British television show, "Girl Don't Come" drew the better reaction and radio airplay: it was as "Girl Don't Come" that the single entered the UK chart (dated 12 December 1964) to peak at No. 3 in the week of 23 January 1965. "Girl Don't Come" has also been recorded by Debby Boone, Cher, Ronnie Dyson (as the B-side to "(If You Let Me Make Love to You Then) Why Can't I Touch You?"), Eddie Rambeau and Ronnie Spector.

== International impact ==
"Girl Don't Come" gave Shaw a No. 2 hit in South Africa and in Canada. In Australia, the song reached No. 48. Like "(There's) Always Something There to Remind Me", "Girl Don't Come" became a regional hit in the United States – where it was released in February 1965 – without entering the Top 40, although it peaked at No. 42 on the Billboard Hot 100 the week of April 23, 1965. It fared slightly better on the Cash Box Top 100, peaking at No. 35 the week of April 3, 1965. Shaw was unable to do U.S. promotion – including a Shindig! appearance scheduled for March – due to the U.S. Federation of TV and Radio Artists refusing her an American work permit. It would be her biggest chart hit in the U.S.A.

Shaw made a belated Italian rendition of "Girl Don't Come" entitled "E ti avrò" in 1966 and, aided by her performance of it on Studio Uno, the top variety show in Italy, "E ti avrò" became a No. 11 hit in 1966–67 (the single's B-side: "Viva l’amore con te" was a version of Shaw's UK No. 1 hit "Long Live Love"). Also in 1966, Shaw's Spanish-language version of "Girl Don't Come" entitled "No vendrá" was released on an EP in Spain, which also included Spanish versions of her hits "Tomorrow", "Long Live Love" and "Message Understood".

Lill Lindfors recorded a Swedish version entitled "Ingen kom" for her 1967 album Du är den ende.

== In popular culture ==
Shaw's original version was featured in Mike Figgis' 1999 film The Loss of Sexual Innocence.
