= Oom-pah =

Rhythmic sound

Oom-pah played by accordion on C major chord with alternate bass.

Oom-pah, Oompah, Ooumpah or Umpapa is an onomatopoeic term describing the rhythmic sound of a deep brass instrument in combination with the response of other instruments or registers in a band, a form of background ostinato.

The 'oom-pah' sound consists of multiple instruments (or one polyphonic instrument, such as the piano or the accordion) alternating between a bass sound and off-beats in higher registers. The 'oom' of the oom-pah sound is usually made by a bass instrument (most commonly the tuba). The pah is played on the off-beats by higher-pitched instruments such as the clarinet, accordion or trombone. Oompah is often associated with Volkstümliche Musik, a form of popular German music, and with polka. In triple time genres such as the waltz it is oom-pah-pah.

The musical Oliver! contains a song named "Oom-Pah-Pah", which is named after the oom-pah.

A more modern variation is the playing of contemporary pop and rock songs in an Oompah style, by bands such as Global Kryner (Austria), Oompah Brass (UK) (who dubbed the style "Oompop"), and Brumpah (UK, West Midlands). The American jam band Phish features the oom-pah-pah in their song "Harpua".

== See also ==
- Duple time, a musical metre
- Carter Family picking, a guitar playing technique
- Humppa, a style of music from Finland
  - Eläkeläiset, a Finnish humppa band
