= Message Understood =

Single by Sandie Shaw
- B-side: "Don't You Count On It"
- Released: 1965
- Genre: Pop
- Label: Pye
- Songwriter(s): Chris Andrews

Sandie Shaw singles chronology
| "Long Live Love" (1965) | "Message Understood" (1965) | "How Can You Tell" (1965) |

"Message Understood" is the sixth single by the British singer Sandie Shaw. Released in September 1965, it was written by Shaw's usual songwriter Chris Andrews, and became her fifth consecutive top-ten hit single in the UK Singles Chart, reaching number six.

== Charts ==
| Chart (1965/1966) | Peak position |
|---|---|
| Ireland | 7 |
| The Netherlands | 30 |
| New Zealand | 7 |
| United Kingdom | 6 |
