= List of UK top-ten singles in 1964 =

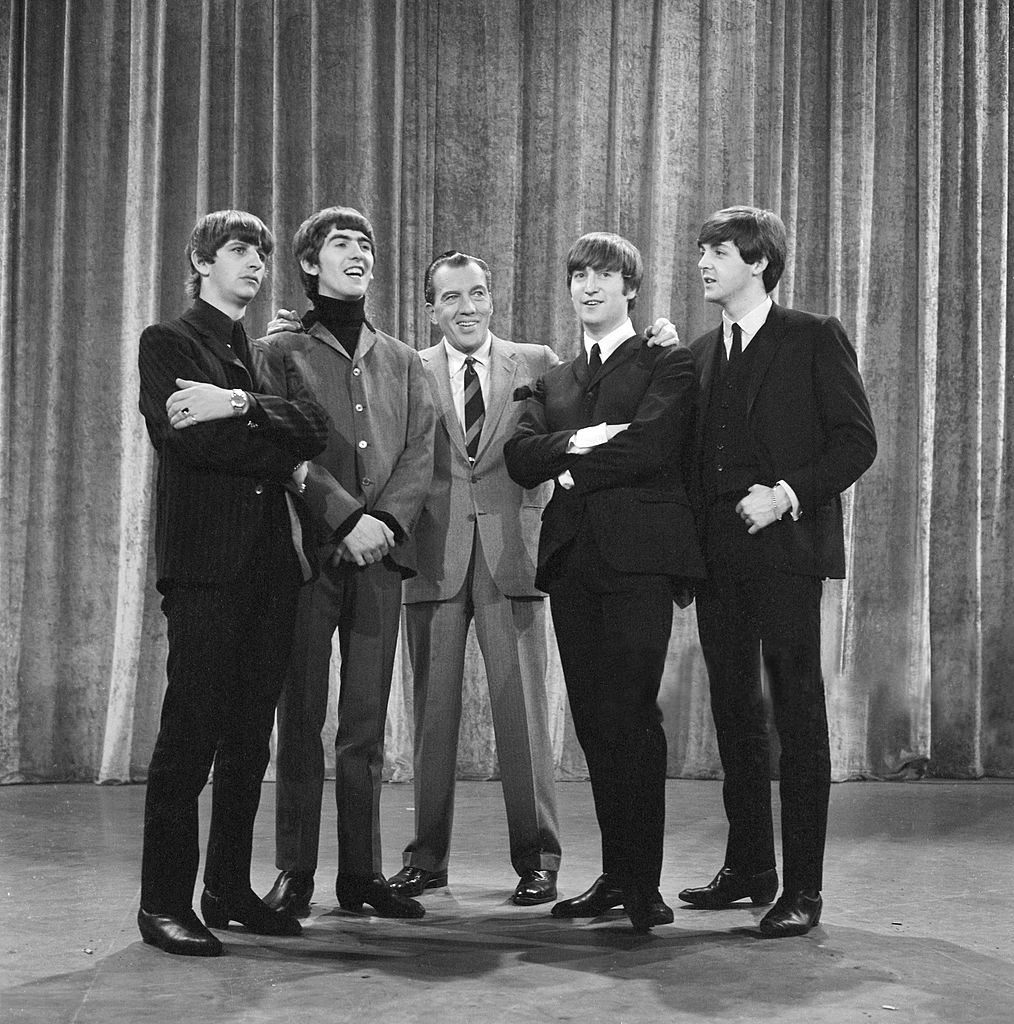
For the second successive year, The Beatles (photographed with Ed Sullivan) had the biggest-selling single of the year with "Can't Buy Me Love", which spent three weeks at number-one and finished as the fourth best-selling single of the 1960s. The group had four other top 10 entries in 1964, all of which topped the chart.

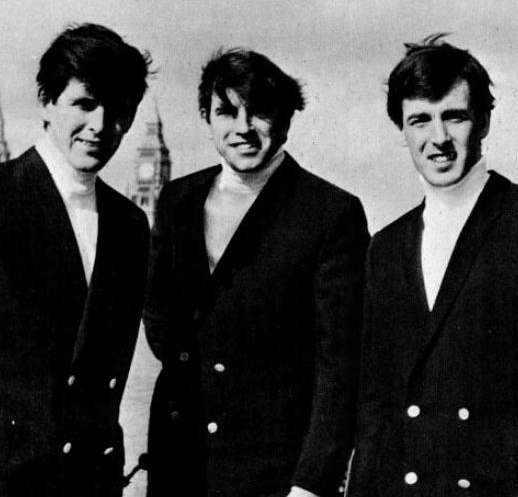
Irish group The Bachelors achieved five UK top 10 hits this year, the highest-charting of which was "Diane", which reached number-one for one week in February.

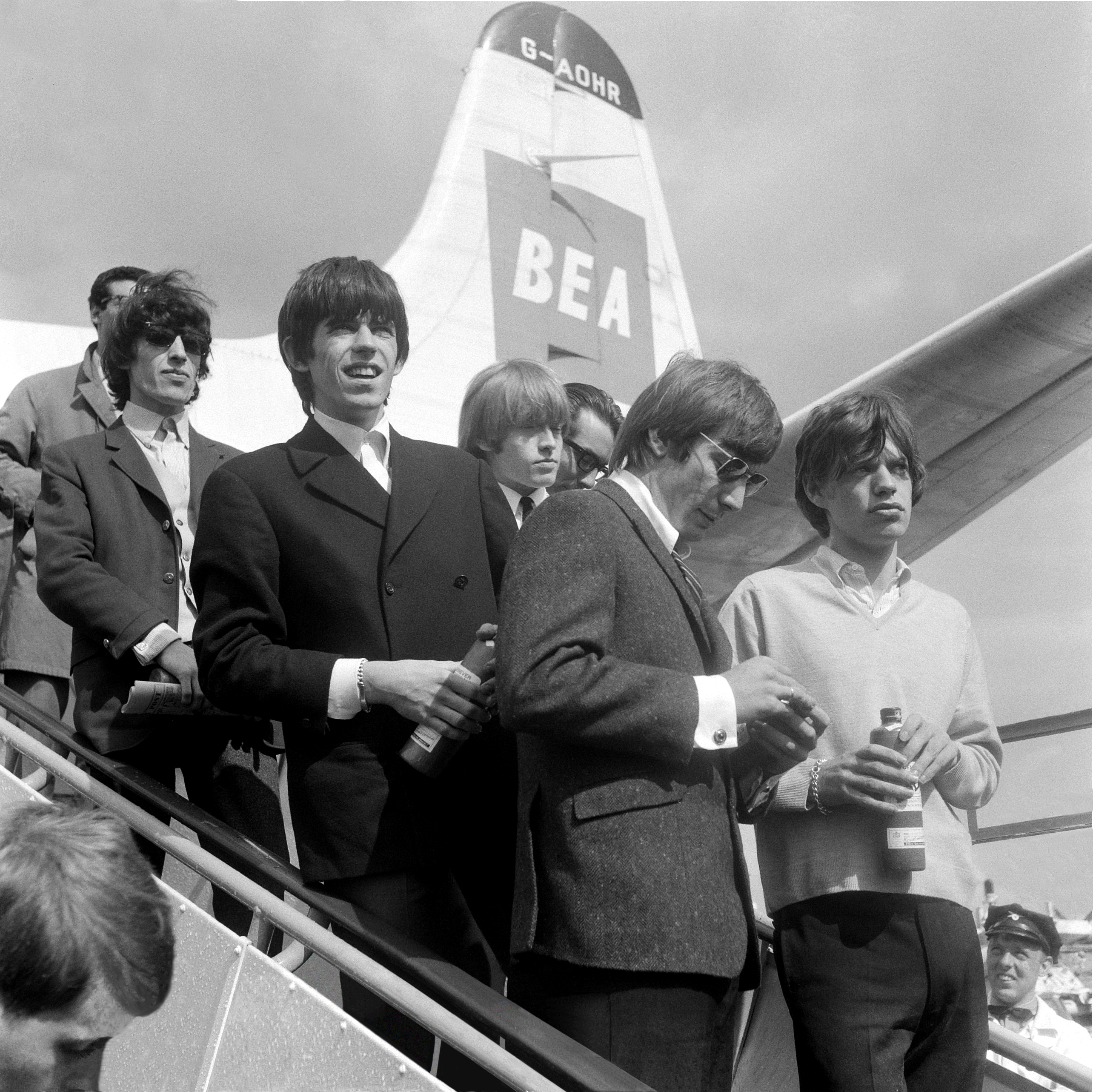
The Rolling Stones entered the top 10 for the first time in 1964, with three singles making the countdown, including the number-one hits "It's All Over Now" and "Little Red Rooster".

The UK Singles Chart is one of many music charts compiled by the Official Charts Company that calculates the best-selling singles of the week in the United Kingdom. Before 2004, the chart was only based on the sales of physical singles. This list shows singles that peaked in the Top 10 of the UK Singles Chart during 1964, as well as singles which peaked in 1963 and 1965 but were in the top 10 in 1964. The entry date is when the single appeared in the top 10 for the first time (week ending, as published by the Official Charts Company, which is six days after the chart is announced).

One-hundred and fourteen singles were in the top ten in 1964. Ten singles from 1963 remained in the top 10 for several weeks at the beginning of the year, while "Somewhere" by P. J. Proby, "Terry" by Twinkle and "Yeh, Yeh" by Georgie Fame and the Blue Flames were all released in 1964 but did not reach their peak until 1965. "Glad All Over" by The Dave Clark Five, "I Only Want to Be with You" by Dusty Springfield and "Twenty Four Hours From Tulsa" by Gene Pitney were the singles from 1963 to reach their peak in 1964. Twenty-eight artists scored multiple entries in the top 10 in 1964. The Beach Boys, Cilla Black, The Hollies, The Kinks and The Rolling Stones were among the many artists who achieved their first UK charting top 10 single in 1964.

The 1963 Christmas number-one, "I Want To Hold Your Hand" by The Beatles, remained at number one for the first two weeks of 1964. The first new number-one single of the year was "Glad All Over" by The Dave Clark Five. Overall, twenty-three different singles peaked at number-one in 1964, with The Beatles (3) having the most singles hit that position.

== Background ==
=== Multiple entries ===
One-hundred and fourteen singles charted in the top 10 in 1964, with one-hundred and four singles reaching their peak this year.

Twenty-eight artists scored multiple entries in the top 10 in 1964. Cliff Richard secured the record for most top 10 hits in 1964 with six hit singles, five of which featured his backing group The Shadows.

The Animals were one of a number of artists with two top-ten entries, including the number-one single "The House of the Rising Sun". Brian Poole, Freddie and the Dreamers, The Kinks, Manfred Mann and The Supremes were among the other artists who had multiple top 10 entries in 1964.

=== Chart debuts ===
Forty artists achieved their first top 10 single in 1964, either as a lead or featured artist. Of these, six went on to record another hit single that year: The Animals, The Kinks, The Nashville Teens, Peter and Gordon, The Supremes and The Swinging Blue Jeans. Cilla Black, Manfred Mann, P. J. Proby and The Rolling Stones all had two more top 10 singles in 1964. The Hollies had three other entries in their breakthrough year.

The following table (collapsed on desktop site) does not include acts who had previously charted as part of a group and secured their first top 10 solo single.

Artist	Number of top 10s	First entry	Chart position	Other entries
The Swinging Blue Jeans	2	"Hippy Hippy Shake"	2	"You're No Good" (3)
Big Dee Irwin	1	"Swinging on a Star"	7	—
The Hollies	4	"Stay"	8	"Just One Look" (2), "Here I Go Again" (4), "We're Through" (7)
Manfred Mann	3	"5-4-3-2-1"	5	"Do Wah Diddy Diddy" (1), "Sha La La" (3)
The Merseybeats	1	"I Think of You"	5	—
Cilla Black	3	"Anyone Who Had a Heart"	1	"You're My World" (1), "It's for You" (7)
The Rolling Stones	3	"Not Fade Away"	3	"It's All Over Now" (1), "Little Red Rooster" (1)
Peter and Gordon	2	"A World Without Love"	1	"Nobody I Know" (10)
The Applejacks	1	"Tell Me When"	7	—
Millie	1	"My Boy Lollipop"	2	—
The Mojos	1	"Everything's Alright"	9	—
The Migil Five	1	"Mockin' Bird Hill"	10	—
The Four Pennies	1	"Juliet"	1	—
Dionne Warwick	1	"Walk On By"	9	—
Mary Wells	1	"My Guy"	5	—
Lulu	1	"Shout"	7	—
The Luvvers	1	"Shout"	7	—
P. J. Proby	3	"Hold Me"	3	"Together" (8), "Somewhere" (6) ^{[A]}
The Animals	2	"The House of the Rising Sun"	1	"I'm Crying" (8)
The Barron Knights	1	"Call Up the Groups"	3	—
The Nashville Teens	2	"Tobacco Road"	6	"Google Eye" (10)
The Beach Boys	1	"I Get Around"	7	—
The Honeycombs	1	"Have I the Right?"	1	—
The Kinks	2	"You Really Got Me"	1	"All Day and All of the Night" (2)
Dave Berry	1	"The Crying Game"	5	—
Herman's Hermits	1	"I'm into Something Good"	1	—
Marianne Faithfull	1	"As Tears Go By"	9	—
The Supremes	2	"Where Did Our Love Go"	3	"Baby Love" (1)
Julie Rogers	1	"The Wedding"	3	—
Sandie Shaw	1	"(There's) Always Something There to Remind Me"	1	—
Henry Mancini Orchestra	1	"How Soon"	10	—
Cliff Bennett and the Rebel Rousers	1	"One Way Love"	9	—
The Rockin' Berries	1	"He's in Town"	3	—
Wayne Fontana	1	"Um, Um, Um, Um, Um, Um"	5	—
The Mindbenders	1	"Um, Um, Um, Um, Um, Um"	5	—
Helmut Zacharias	1	"Tokyo Melody"	9	—
The Pretty Things	1	"Don't Bring Me Down"	10	—
Val Doonican	1	"Walk Tall"	3	—
Georgie Fame and the Blue Flames	1	"Yeh, Yeh"	1	—
Twinkle"	1	"Terry"	4	—

=== Songs from films ===
Original songs from various films entered the top 10 throughout the year. These included "Kissin' Cousins" (from Kissin' Cousins), "Move Over Darling" (Move Over, Darling) and "A Hard Day's Night" and "Can't Buy Me Love" (A Hard Day's Night).

Additionally, the original recording of "Swinging on a Star" by Bing Crosby won the Academy Award for Best Original Song after being used in the 1944 film Going My Way. "Diane" was written for the 1927 silent film Seventh Heaven. P. J. Proby released a cover version of "Somewhere" from the film West Side Story, reaching number six at the beginning of 1965.

=== Best-selling singles ===
Until 1970 there was no universally recognised year-end best-sellers list. However, in 2011 the Official Charts Company released a list of the best-selling single of each year in chart history from 1952 to date. According to the list, "Can't Buy Me Love" by The Beatles is officially recorded as the biggest-selling single of 1964. "Can't Buy Me Love" (4) and "I Feel Fine" (5) both ranked in the top 10 best-selling singles of the decade.

== Top-ten singles ==
Key

Symbol	Meaning
‡	Single peaked in 1963 but still in chart in 1964.
♦	Single released in 1964 but peaked in 1965.
(#)	Year-end best-selling single.
Entered	The date that the single first appeared in the chart.
Peak	Highest position that the single reached in the UK Singles Chart.

Entered (week ending)	Weeks in top 10	Single	Artist	Peak	Peak reached (week ending)	Weeks at peak
Singles in 1963
5 September 1963	21	"She Loves You" ‡	The Beatles	1	12 September 1963	6
14 November 1963	8	"Don't Talk to Him" ‡	Cliff Richard & The Shadows	2	5 December 1963	1
21 November 1963	8	"Secret Love" ‡	Kathy Kirby	4	12 December 1963	2
28 November 1963	8	"You Were Made for Me" ‡	Freddie and the Dreamers	3	5 December 1963	4
28 November 1963	6	"María Elena" ‡	Los Indios Tabajaras	5	12 December 1963	1
5 December 1963	12	"Glad All Over"	The Dave Clark Five	1	16 January 1964	2
5 December 1963	9	"I Only Want to Be with You"	Dusty Springfield	4	9 January 1964	3
5 December 1963	10	"I Want to Hold Your Hand" ‡	The Beatles	1	12 December 1963	5
12 December 1963	6	"Dominique" ‡	The Singing Nun (Sœur Sourire)	7	26 December 1963	2
19 December 1963	8	"Twenty Four Hours from Tulsa"	Gene Pitney	5	2 January 1964	2
Singles in 1964
9 January 1964	7	"Hippy Hippy Shake"	The Swinging Blue Jeans	2	23 January 1964	1
9 January 1964	3	"Swinging on a Star" ^{[B]}	Big Dee Irwin	7	16 January 1964	2
16 January 1964	2	"Stay" ^{[C]}	The Hollies	8	16 January 1964	2
23 January 1964	9	"Needles and Pins"	The Searchers	1	30 January 1964	3
23 January 1964	7	"As Usual"	Brenda Lee	5	6 February 1964	1
23 January 1964	7	"I'm the One"	Gerry and the Pacemakers	2	6 February 1964	2
30 January 1964	3	"Don't Blame Me"	Frank Ifield	8	13 February 1964	1
6 February 1964	9	"Diane"	The Bachelors	1	20 February 1964	1
6 February 1964	5	"5-4-3-2-1"	Manfred Mann	5	13 February 1964	2
13 February 1964	6	"I Think of You"	The Merseybeats	5	27 February 1964	2
13 February 1964	8	"Anyone Who Had a Heart"	Cilla Black	1	27 February 1964	3
20 February 1964	2	"I'm the Lonely One"	Cliff Richard & The Shadows	8	27 February 1964	1
27 February 1964	7	"Bits and Pieces"	The Dave Clark Five	2	5 March 1964	3
27 February 1964	2	"Candy Man"	Brian Poole & The Tremeloes	6	5 March 1964	1
5 March 1964	8	"Little Children"	Billy J. Kramer & The Dakotas	1	19 March 1964	2
12 March 1964	7	"Not Fade Away"	The Rolling Stones	3	26 March 1964	1
12 March 1964	7	"Just One Look"	The Hollies	2	26 March 1964	1
12 March 1964	3	"Boys Cry"	Eden Kane	8	19 March 1964	1
12 March 1964	1	"Let Me Go, Lover!"	Kathy Kirby	10	12 March 1964	1
19 March 1964	10	"I Love You Because"	Jim Reeves	5	26 March 1964	3
26 March 1964	4	"That Girl Belongs to Yesterday"	Gene Pitney	7	26 March 1964	1
26 March 1964	7	"Can't Buy Me Love" (#1)	The Beatles	1	2 April 1964	3
2 April 1964	9	"I Believe"	The Bachelors	2	7 May 1964	1
9 April 1964	6	"A World Without Love"	Peter and Gordon	1	23 April 1964	2
9 April 1964	3	"Tell Me When"	The Applejacks	7	16 April 1964	2
16 April 1964	8	"My Boy Lollipop"	Millie	2	21 May 1964	1
23 April 1964	6	"Don't Throw Your Love Away"	The Searchers	1	7 May 1964	2
30 April 1964	4	"Don't Let the Sun Catch You Crying"	Gerry and the Pacemakers	6	7 May 1964	1
30 April 1964	2	"Move Over Darling"	Doris Day	8	30 April 1964	2
30 April 1964	1	"Everything's Alright"	The Mojos	9	30 April 1964	1
30 April 1964	1	"Mockin' Bird Hill"	The Migil Five	10	30 April 1964	1
7 May 1964	6	"Juliet"	The Four Pennies	1	21 May 1964	1
7 May 1964	2	"Walk On By" ^{[D]}	Dionne Warwick	9	7 May 1964	1
14 May 1964	11	"It's Over"	Roy Orbison	1	25 June 1964	2
14 May 1964	6	"Constantly"	Cliff Richard	4	4 June 1964	1
14 May 1964	4	"A Little Loving"	The Fourmost	6	28 May 1964	1
21 May 1964	7	"You're My World"	Cilla Black	1	28 May 1964	4
28 May 1964	4	"The Rise and Fall of Flingel Bunt"	The Shadows	5	4 June 1964	1
28 May 1964	4	"No Particular Place to Go"	Chuck Berry	3	11 June 1964	1
4 June 1964	7	"Someone, Someone"	Brian Poole & The Tremeloes	2	25 June 1964	2
11 June 1964	3	"Here I Go Again"	The Hollies	4	18 June 1964	1
11 June 1964	4	"My Guy"	Mary Wells	5	18 June 1964	2
11 June 1964	3	"Shout"	Lulu & The Luvvers	7	18 June 1964	1
18 June 1964	4	"Hello, Dolly!"	Louis Armstrong	4	25 June 1964	1
25 June 1964	3	"Ramona"	The Bachelors	4	2 July 1964	1
25 June 1964	4	"You're No Good"	The Swinging Blue Jeans	3	2 July 1964	1
25 June 1964	1	"Can't You See That She's Mine"	The Dave Clark Five	10	25 June 1964	1
2 July 1964	5	"Hold Me"	P. J. Proby	3	9 July 1964	1
2 July 1964	6	"The House of the Rising Sun"	The Animals	1	9 July 1964	1
2 July 1964	1	"Nobody I Know"	Peter and Gordon	10	2 July 1964	1
9 July 1964	9	"It's All Over Now"	The Rolling Stones	1	16 July 1964	1
9 July 1964	15	"I Won't Forget You"	Jim Reeves	3	27 August 1964	3
9 July 1964	1	"Kissin' Cousins"	Elvis Presley	10	9 July 1964	1
16 July 1964	9	"A Hard Day's Night"	The Beatles	1	23 July 1964	3
16 July 1964	6	"I Just Don't Know What to Do with Myself"	Dusty Springfield	3	23 July 1964	2
16 July 1964	5	"On the Beach"	Cliff Richard & The Shadows	7	6 August 1964	1
23 July 1964	6	"Call Up the Groups"	The Barron Knights	3	6 August 1964	2
23 July 1964	9	"Do Wah Diddy Diddy"	Manfred Mann	1	13 August 1964	2
30 July 1964	5	"Tobacco Road"	The Nashville Teens	6	6 August 1964	4
6 August 1964	5	"I Get Around"	The Beach Boys	7	27 August 1964	1
13 August 1964	1	"It's Only Make Believe"	Billy Fury	10	13 August 1964	1
20 August 1964	7	"Have I the Right?"	The Honeycombs	1	27 August 1964	2
20 August 1964	1	"From a Window"	Billy J. Kramer & The Dakotas	10	20 August 1964	1
27 August 1964	6	"You Really Got Me"	The Kinks	1	10 September 1964	2
27 August 1964	2	"It's for You"	Cilla Black	7	3 September 1964	1
3 September 1964	4	"The Crying Game"	Dave Berry	5	3 September 1964	2
3 September 1964	7	"I Wouldn't Trade You for the World"	The Bachelors	4	10 September 1964	1
10 September 1964	8	"I'm into Something Good"	Herman's Hermits	1	24 September 1964	2
10 September 1964	6	"Rag Doll"	The Four Seasons	2	24 September 1964	2
10 September 1964	4	"As Tears Go By"	Marianne Faithfull	9	10 September 1964	3
17 September 1964	8	"Where Did Our Love Go"	The Supremes	3	1 October 1964	3
24 September 1964	10	"Oh, Pretty Woman"	Roy Orbison	1	8 October 1964	3
1 October 1964	7	"The Wedding"	Julie Rogers	3	29 October 1964	2
8 October 1964	1	"Together"	P. J. Proby	8	8 October 1964	1
8 October 1964	5	"When You Walk in the Room"	The Searchers	3	22 October 1964	1
8 October 1964	3	"I'm Crying"	The Animals	8	15 October 1964	1
15 October 1964	4	"We're Through"	The Hollies	7	29 October 1964	1
22 October 1964	5	"(There's) Always Something There to Remind Me"	Sandie Shaw	1	22 October 1964	3
22 October 1964	5	"Walk Away"	Matt Monro	4	5 November 1964	2
22 October 1964	1	"How Soon"	Henry Mancini Orchestra	10	22 October 1964	1
29 October 1964	2	"The Twelfth of Never"	Cliff Richard	8	29 October 1964	2
29 October 1964	1	"One Way Love"	Cliff Bennett and the Rebel Rousers	9	29 October 1964	1
5 November 1964	3	"Sha La La"	Manfred Mann	3	12 November 1964	1
5 November 1964	7	"Baby Love"	The Supremes	1	19 November 1964	2
12 November 1964	4	"He's in Town"	The Rockin' Berries	3	19 November 1964	1
12 November 1964	5	"All Day and All of the Night"	The Kinks	2	19 November 1964	2
12 November 1964	5	"Um, Um, Um, Um, Um, Um"	Wayne Fontana & The Mindbenders	5	26 November 1964	1
12 November 1964	1	"Google Eye"	The Nashville Teens	10	12 November 1964	1
19 November 1964	1	"Tokyo Melody"	Helmut Zacharias	9	19 November 1964	1
19 November 1964	1	"Don't Bring Me Down"	The Pretty Things	10	19 November 1964	1
26 November 1964	5	"Little Red Rooster"	The Rolling Stones	1	3 December 1964	1
26 November 1964	7	"I'm Gonna Be Strong"	Gene Pitney	2	3 December 1964	2
26 November 1964	3	"There's A Heartache Following Me"	Jim Reeves	6	10 December 1964	1
26 November 1964	9	"Downtown"	Petula Clark	2	17 December 1964	3
26 November 1964	2	"Losing You"	Dusty Springfield	9	3 December 1964	1
3 December 1964	8	"I Feel Fine"	The Beatles	1	10 December 1964	5
10 December 1964	7	"Walk Tall"	Val Doonican	3	17 December 1964	2
10 December 1964	3	"Pretty Paper"	Roy Orbison	6	17 December 1964	2
17 December 1964	3	"I Understand"	Freddie and the Dreamers	5	24 December 1964	2
17 December 1964	3	"No Arms Can Ever Hold You"	The Bachelors	7	24 December 1964	1
17 December 1964	4	"I Could Easily Fall (in Love with You)"	Cliff Richard & The Shadows	6	31 December 1964	1
24 December 1964	5	"Somewhere" ♦	P. J. Proby	6	14 January 1965	2
31 December 1964	6	"Yeh, Yeh" ♦	Georgie Fame and the Blue Flames	1	14 January 1965	2
31 December 1964	6	"Terry" ♦	Twinkle	4	7 January 1965	3

== Entries by artist ==
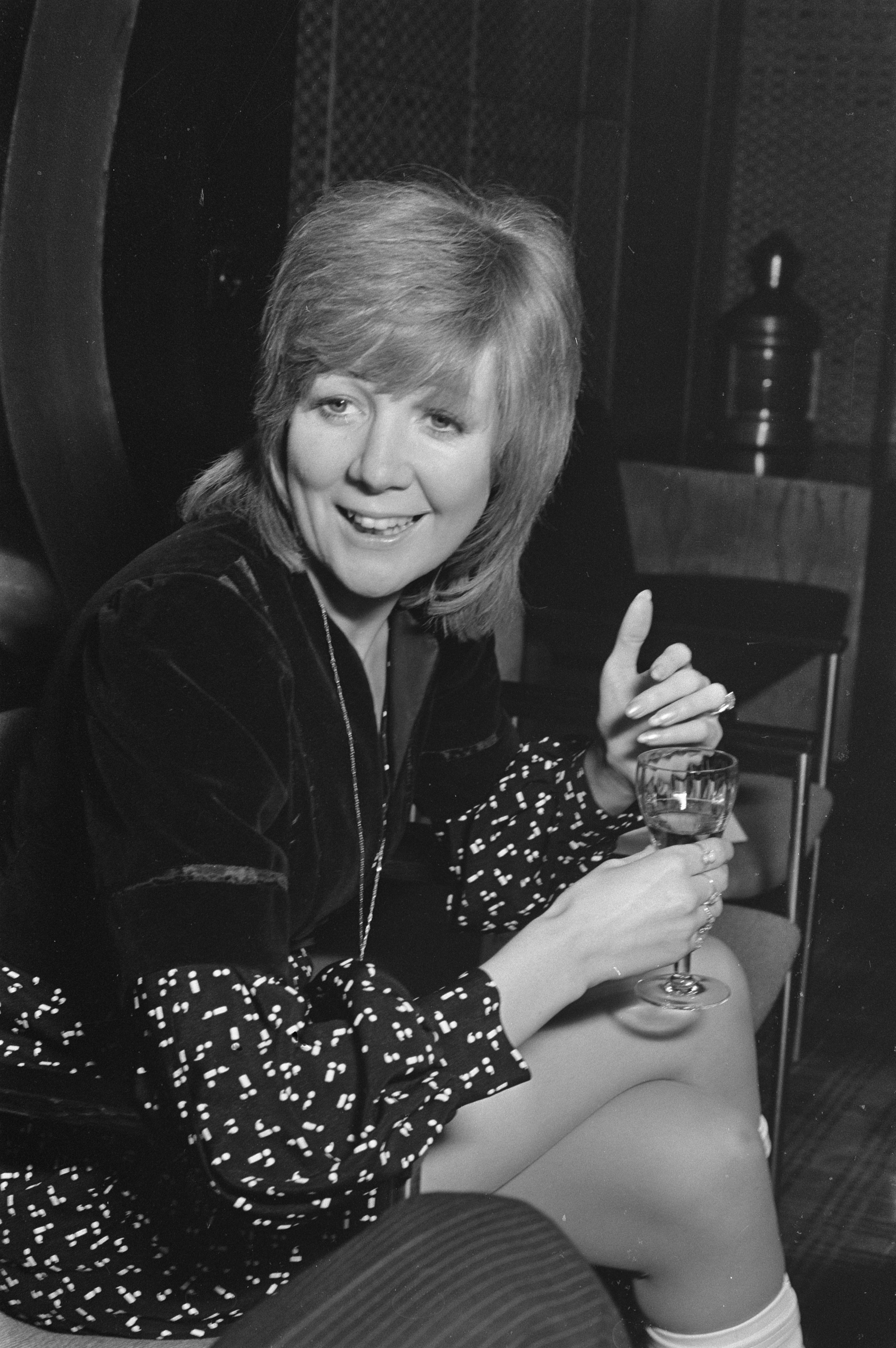
Cilla Black made her first appearance in the top 10 this year, achieving three entries, including the number-one hits "Anyone Who Had a Heart" and "You're My World".

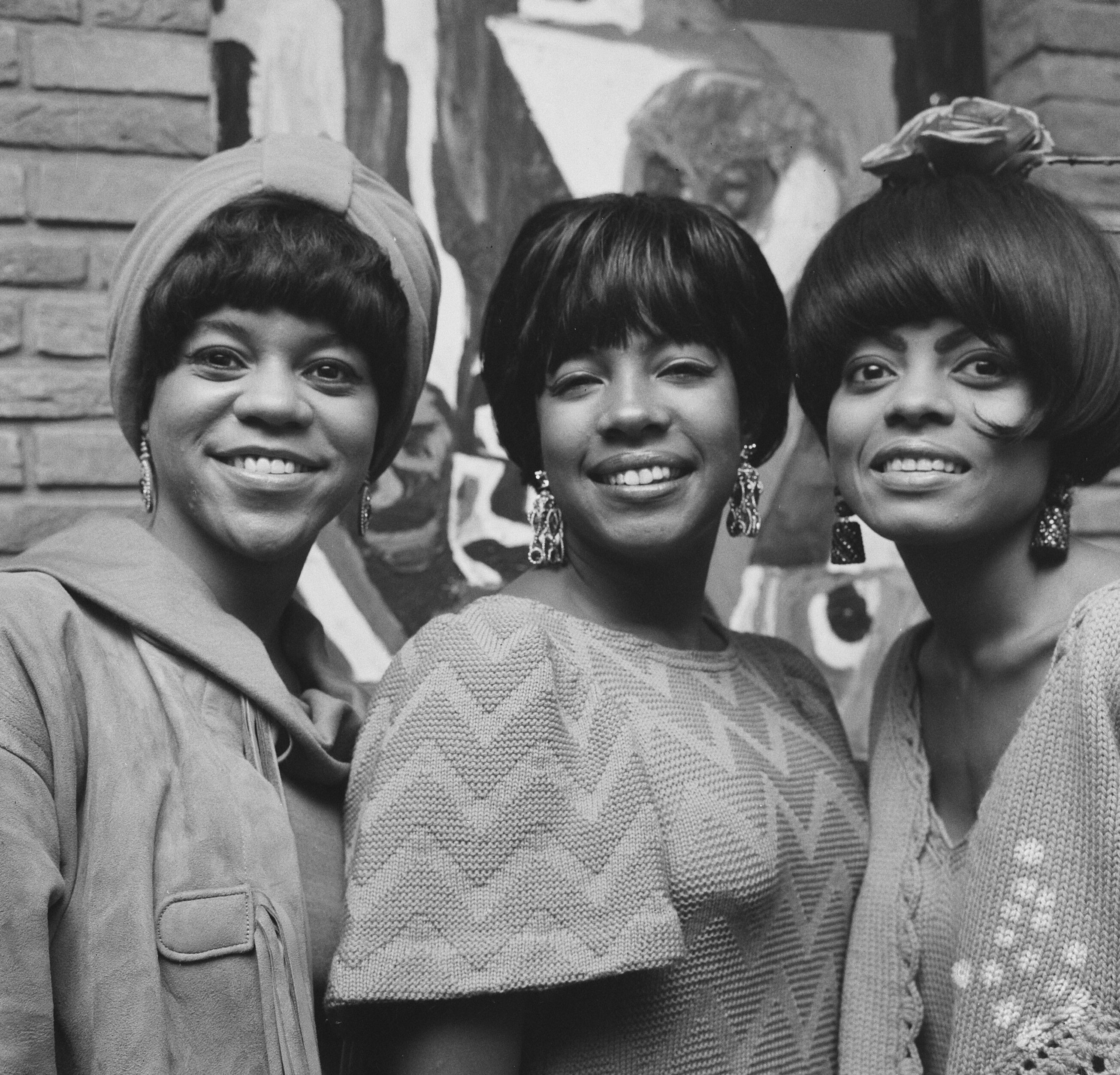
The Supremes made their chart debut this year, securing two top 10 entries, including "Baby Love", which became the first Motown song to reach number-one in the UK.

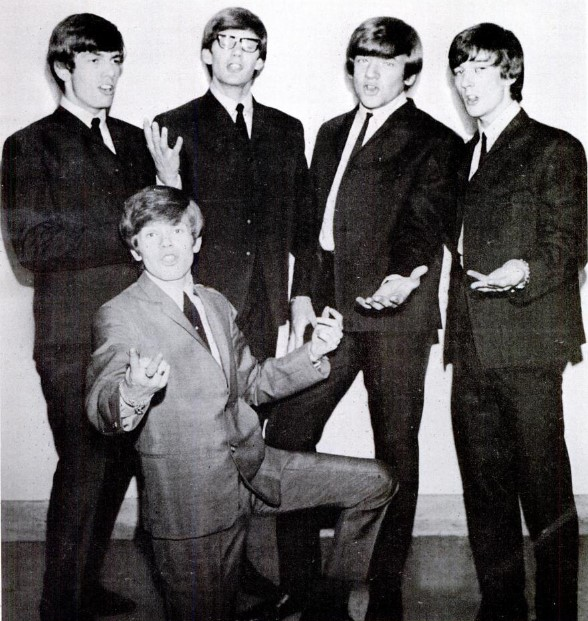
Herman's Hermits reached number-one in the UK in September 1964 with their debut single "I'm into Something Good".

The following table shows artists who achieved two or more top 10 entries in 1964, including singles that reached their peak in 1963 or 1965. The figures include both main artists and featured artists. The total number of weeks an artist spent in the top ten in 1964 is also shown.

Entries	Artist	Weeks	Singles
6	Cliff Richard ^{[E]}^{[F]}	19	"Constantly", "Don't Talk to Him", "I Could Easily Fall (in Love with You)", "I'm the Lonely One", "On the Beach", "The Twelfth of Never"
5	The Bachelors	31	"Diane", "I Believe", "I Wouldn't Trade You for the World", "No Arms Can Ever Hold You", "Ramona"
5	The Beatles ^{[E]}	32	"A Hard Day's Night", "Can't Buy Me Love", "I Feel Fine", "I Want to Hold Your Hand", "She Loves You"
5	The Shadows ^{[E]}^{[F]}	15	"Don't Talk to Him", "I Could Easily Fall (in Love with You)", "I'm the Lonely One", "On the Beach", "The Rise and Fall of Flingel Bunt"
4	The Hollies	16	"Here I Go Again", "Just One Look", "Stay", "We're Through"
3	Cilla Black	17	"Anyone Who Had a Heart", "It's for You", "You're My World"
3	The Dave Clark Five ^{[G]}	16	"Bits and Pieces", "Can't You See That She's Mine", "Glad All Over"
3	Dusty Springfield ^{[G]}	16	"I Just Don't Know What to Do with Myself", "I Only Want to Be with You", "Losing You"
3	Gene Pitney ^{[G]}	16	"I'm Gonna Be Strong", "That Girl Belongs to Yesterday", "Twenty Four Hours from Tulsa"
3	Jim Reeves	28	"I Love You Because", "I Won't Forget You", "There's a Heartache Following Me"
3	Manfred Mann	17	"5-4-3-2-1", "Do Wah Diddy Diddy", "Sha La La"
3	P. J. Proby ^{[F]}	7	"Hold Me", "Together", "Somewhere"
3	The Rolling Stones	21	"It's All Over Now", "Little Red Rooster", "Not Fade Away"
3	Roy Orbison	24	"It's Over", "Oh, Pretty Woman", "Pretty Paper"
3	The Searchers	20	"Don't Throw Your Love Away", "Needles and Pins", "When You Walk in the Room"
2	The Animals	9	"The House of the Rising Sun", "I'm Crying"
2	Billy J. Kramer & The Dakotas	9	"From a Window", "Little Children"
2	Brian Poole & The Tremeloes	9	"Candy Man", "Someone, Someone"
2	Freddie and the Dreamers ^{[E]}	7	"I Understand", "You Were Made for Me"
2	Gerry and the Pacemakers	11	"Don't Let the Sun Catch You Crying", "I'm the One"
2	Kathy Kirby ^{[E]}	4	"Let Me Go, Lover!", "Secret Love"
2	The Kinks	11	"All Day and All of the Night", "You Really Got Me"
2	The Nashville Teens	6	"Google Eye", "Tobacco Road"
2	Peter and Gordon	7	"A World Without Love", "Nobody I Know"
2	The Supremes	15	"Baby Love", "Where Did Our Love Go"
2	The Swinging Blue Jeans	11	"Hippy Hippy Shake", "You're No Good"

== See also ==
- 1964 in British music
- List of number-one singles from the 1960s (UK)

== Notes ==
- ^{a} "Somewhere" reached its peak of number six on 14 January 1965 (week ending).
- ^{b} "Swinging on a Star" features uncredited guest vocals by Little Eva.
- ^{c} "Stay" re-entered the top 10 at number 8 on 30 January 1964 (week ending).
- ^{d} "Walk On By" re-entered the top 10 at number 10 on 4 June 1964 (week ending).
- ^{e} Figure includes single that peaked in 1963.
- ^{f} Figure includes single that peaked in 1965.
- ^{g} Figure includes single that first charted in 1963 but peaked in 1964.
