= List of Cash Box Best Sellers number-one singles of 1955 =

These are the songs that reached number one on the Top 50 Best Sellers chart in 1955 as published by Cash Box magazine.

| Issue date | Song | Artist |
|---|---|---|
| January 1 | "Mr. Sandman" | The Chordettes, The Four Aces |
| January 8 | "Let Me Go, Lover!" | Joan Weber |
| January 15 | "Mr. Sandman" | The Chordettes, The Four Aces |
| January 22 | "Mr. Sandman" | The Chordettes, The Four Aces |
| January 29 | "Mr. Sandman" | The Chordettes, The Four Aces |
| February 5 | "Melody of Love" | Billy Vaughn & Orchestra, David Carroll & Orchestra, The Four Aces |
| February 12 | "Melody of Love" | Billy Vaughn & Orchestra, David Carroll & Orchestra, The Four Aces |
| February 19 | "Melody of Love" | Billy Vaughn & Orchestra, David Carroll & Orchestra, The Four Aces |
| February 26 | "Melody of Love" | Billy Vaughn & Orchestra, David Carroll & Orchestra, The Four Aces |
| March 5 | "Melody of Love" | Billy Vaughn & Orchestra, David Carroll & Orchestra, The Four Aces |
| March 12 | "Melody of Love" | Billy Vaughn & Orchestra, David Carroll & Orchestra, The Four Aces |
| March 19 | "Melody of Love" | Billy Vaughn & Orchestra, David Carroll & Orchestra, The Four Aces |
| March 26 | "The Ballad of Davy Crockett" | Bill Hayes |
| April 2 | "The Ballad of Davy Crockett" | Bill Hayes |
| April 9 | "The Ballad of Davy Crockett" | Bill Hayes |
| April 16 | "The Ballad of Davy Crockett" | Bill Hayes |
| April 23 | "The Ballad of Davy Crockett" | Bill Hayes |
| April 30 | "The Ballad of Davy Crockett" | Bill Hayes |
| May 7 | "The Ballad of Davy Crockett" | Bill Hayes, Fess Parker, Tennessee Ernie Ford |
| May 14 | "The Ballad of Davy Crockett" | Bill Hayes, Fess Parker, Tennessee Ernie Ford |
| May 21 | "Unchained Melody" | Les Baxter & Orchestra, Al Hibbler, Roy Hamilton |
| May 28 | "Unchained Melody" | Les Baxter & Orchestra, Al Hibbler, Roy Hamilton |
| June 4 | "Unchained Melody" | Les Baxter & Orchestra, Al Hibbler, Roy Hamilton |
| June 11 | "Unchained Melody" | Les Baxter & Orchestra, Al Hibbler, Roy Hamilton |
| June 18 | "Unchained Melody" | Les Baxter & Orchestra, Al Hibbler, Roy Hamilton |
| June 25 | "Unchained Melody" | Les Baxter & Orchestra, Al Hibbler, Roy Hamilton |
| July 2 | "(We're Gonna) Rock Around the Clock" | Bill Haley & His Comets |
| July 9 | "(We're Gonna) Rock Around the Clock" | Bill Haley & His Comets |
| July 16 | "(We're Gonna) Rock Around the Clock" | Bill Haley & His Comets |
| July 23 | "(We're Gonna) Rock Around the Clock" | Bill Haley & His Comets |
| July 30 | "(We're Gonna) Rock Around the Clock" | Bill Haley & His Comets |
| August 6 | "(We're Gonna) Rock Around the Clock" | Bill Haley & His Comets |
| August 13 | "(We're Gonna) Rock Around the Clock" | Bill Haley & His Comets |
| August 20 | "(We're Gonna) Rock Around the Clock" | Bill Haley & His Comets |
| August 27 | "The Yellow Rose of Texas" | Mitch Miller & Orchestra, Johnny Desmond |
| September 3 | "The Yellow Rose of Texas" | Mitch Miller & Orchestra, Johnny Desmond |
| September 10 | "The Yellow Rose of Texas" | Mitch Miller & Orchestra, Johnny Desmond |
| September 17 | "The Yellow Rose of Texas" | Mitch Miller & Orchestra, Johnny Desmond |
| September 24 | "The Yellow Rose of Texas" | Mitch Miller & Orchestra, Johnny Desmond |
| October 1 | "The Yellow Rose of Texas" | Mitch Miller & Orchestra, Johnny Desmond |
| October 8 | "The Yellow Rose of Texas" | Mitch Miller & Orchestra, Johnny Desmond |
| October 15 | "Love is a Many-Splendored Thing" | The Four Aces |
| October 22 | "Love is a Many-Splendored Thing" | The Four Aces |
| October 29 | "Autumn Leaves" | Roger Williams |
| November 5 | "Love is a Many-Splendored Thing" | The Four Aces |
| November 12 | "Autumn Leaves" | Roger Williams |
| November 19 | "Autumn Leaves" | Roger Williams |
| November 26 | "Sixteen Tons" | Tennessee Ernie Ford |
| December 3 | "Sixteen Tons" | Tennessee Ernie Ford |
| December 10 | "Sixteen Tons" | Tennessee Ernie Ford |
| December 17 | "Sixteen Tons" | Tennessee Ernie Ford |
| December 24 | "Sixteen Tons" | Tennessee Ernie Ford |
| December 31 | "Sixteen Tons" | Tennessee Ernie Ford |

== See also ==
- 1955 in music
- List of number-one singles of 1955 (U.S.)
