= The Bachelors discography =

- Studio albums: 19
- EPs: 4
- Live albums: 1
- Compilation albums: 10
- Singles: 38

This is the discography of Irish group the Bachelors.

== Albums ==
=== Studio albums (UK) ===
Title	Album details	Peak chart positions
Title	Album details	UK
The Bachelors	Released: May 1963; Label: Decca; Formats: LP	—
The Bachelors + 16 Great Songs	Released: June 1964; Label: Decca; Formats: LP	2
More Great Song Hits	Released: September 1965; Label: Decca; Formats: LP	15
Hits of the 60's	Released: June 1966; Label: Decca; Formats: LP	12
Bachelors' Girls	Released: October 1966; Label: Decca; Formats: LP	24
The Bachelors Sing the Golden All Time Hits	Released: June 1967; Label: Decca; Formats: LP	19
Under and Over	Released: 1971; Label: Decca; Formats: LP	—
Stage and Screen Spectacular – 16 Great Songs (with Patricia Cahill)	Released: January 1972; Label: Decca; Formats: LP	—
Answer Me (as the Fabulous Bachelors)	Released: 1973; Label: Contour; Formats: LP	—
Bachelors '74	Released: 1974; Label: Philips; Formats: LP	—
Bachelors' Singalong – 32 Favourite Songs	Released: 1975; Label: Philips; Formats: LP	—
Now & Then (as the New Bachelors)	Released: 1985; Label: CBS; Formats: LP, MC	—
Renaissance	Released: 1996; Label: Juicy; Formats: CD, MC	—
Christmas with the Bachelors	Released: 2003; Label: Music Digital; Formats: CD, MC	—
"—" denotes releases that did not chart.

=== Studio albums (US and Canada) ===
Title	Album details	Peak chart positions
Title	Album details	US
Presenting: The Bachelors	Released: May 1964; Label: London; Formats: LP	70
Back Again	Released: September 1964; Label: London; Formats: LP	142
No Arms Can Ever Hold You	Released: February 1965; Label: London; Formats: LP, 4-track	136
Marie	Released: July 1965; Label: London; Formats: LP, 4-track	89
Hits of the 60's	Released: April 1966; Label: London; Formats: LP	—
Bachelors' Girls	Released: October 1966; Label: London; Formats: LP	—
The Golden All Time Hits	Released: August 1967; Label: London; Formats: LP	—
Bachelors '68	Released: February 1968; Label: London; Formats: LP	—
Under and Over	Released: 1972; Label: London; Formats: LP	—
"—" denotes releases that did not chart.

=== Live albums ===
Title	Album details
Live at the Talk of the Town	Released: August 1971; Label: Decca; Formats: LP

=== Compilation albums ===
Title	Album details	Peak chart positions
Title	Album details	UK
The World of the Bachelors	Released: November 1968; Label: Decca; Formats: LP	8
The World of the Bachelors Vol. 2	Released: August 1969; Label: Decca; Formats: LP	11
The World of the Bachelors Vol. 3	Released: 1969; Label: Decca; Formats: LP	—
The World of the Bachelors Vol. 4	Released: 1970; Label: Decca; Formats: LP	—
The World of the Bachelors Vol. 5	Released: 1970; Label: Decca; Formats: LP	—
The Very Best of the Bachelors	Released: 1973; Label: Decca; Formats: 2xLP	—
25 Golden Greats	Released: October 1979; Label: Warwick; Formats: LP	38
The Best of the Bachelors	Released: September 1981; Label: Decca; Formats: LP	—
The Very Best of the Bachelors	Released: 1998; Label: Prism Leisure; Formats: CD	—
'I Believe' – The Very Best of the Bachelors	Released: 21 July 2008; Label: Universal Music/Decca; Formats: 2xCD	7
"—" denotes releases that did not chart.

== EPs ==
Title	EP details	Peak chart positions
Title	EP details	UK
The Bachelors	Released: June 1963; Label: Decca; Formats: 7"	5
The Bachelors Volume 2	Released: February 1964; Label: Decca; Formats: 7"	7
The Bachelors' Hits	Released: October 1964; Label: Decca; Formats: 7"	1
Bachelors Hits Vol. 2	Released: October 1965; Label: Decca; Formats: 7"	9

== Singles ==
Title (A-side, B-side)	Year	Peak chart positions								UK Album	US Album
Title (A-side, B-side)	Year	IRE	AUS	CAN	NOR	NZ	UK	US	US AC	UK Album	US Album
"Charmaine" b/w "Old Bill"	1962	8	—	—	—	—	6	—	—	The Bachelors	Presenting: The Bachelors
"Faraway Places" b/w "Is There a Chance"	1963	—	—	—	—	—	36	—	—	Non-album single	Non-album single
"Whispering" b/w "No Light in the Window"	1963	—	—	—	—	—	18	—	—	A: The Bachelors; B: Non-album track	A: Presenting: The Bachelors; B: Non-album track
"Long Time Ago" b/w "The Angel and the Stranger"	1963	9	—	—	—	—	—	—	—	Non-album single	Non-album single
"Diane" b/w "The Stars Will Remember"	1964	2	3	8	—	2	1	10	3	A: The Bachelors + 16 Great Songs; B: Non-album track	A: Presenting: The Bachelors; B: Non-album track
"I Believe" b/w "Happy Land" (UK); "Sweet Lullabies" (US)	1964	2	24	31	—	1	2	33	7	A: The Bachelors + 16 Great Songs; UK B & US B: Non-album tracks	A: Presenting: The Bachelors; UK B & US B: Non-album tracks
"Ramona" b/w "Sweet Lullabies"	1964	6	38	—	9	6	4	—	—	Non-album singles	A: Back Again; B: Non-album track
"I Wouldn't Trade You for the World" b/w "Beneath the Willow Tree"	1964	1	7	—	—	5	4	69	13	Non-album singles	A: Back Again; B: Non-album track
"No Arms Can Ever Hold You" b/w "Oh, Samuel Don't Die"	1964	8	35	10	—	—	7	27	3	Non-album singles	A: No Arms Can Ever Hold You; B: Non-album track
"True Love for Evermore" b/w "Far Far Away"	1965	—	—	—	—	—	34	—	—	A: More Great Song Hits; B: Non-album track	A: Non-album track B: No Arms Can Ever Hold You
"Marie" b/w "You Can Tell"	1965	—	39	11	—	—	9	15	3	Non-album singles	A: Marie; B: Non-album track
"In the Chapel in the Moonlight" b/w "The Old Wishing Well"	1965	—	89	24	—	—	27	32	2	Non-album singles	Non-album single
"Hello, Dolly!" b/w "There's No Room in My Heart"	1965	—	—	—	—	—	38	—	—	A: Bachelors' Girls; B: Non-album track	A: Bachelors' Girls; B: Non-album track
"The Sound of Silence" b/w "Love Me with All Your Heart"	1966	9	—	—	—	—	3	—	—	Hits of the 60's	Hits of the 60's
"Love Me with All Your Heart" (US and Canada-only release) b/w "There's No Room in My Heart"	1966	—	—	46	—	—	—	38	3	A: Hits of the 60's B: Non-album track	A: Hits of the 60's B: Non-album track
"Can I Trust You" b/w "Who Can I Turn To" (UK); "My Girl" (US)	1966	—	43	66	—	—	26	49	12	A & US B: Non-album track UK B: Hits of the 60's	A & US B: Non-album track UK B: Hits of the 60's
"Walk with Faith in Your Heart" b/w "Molly Malone"	1966	—	74	—	—	—	21	83	26	Non-album singles	A: Bachelors '68; B: Non-album track
"Oh How I Miss You" b/w "Ghost Mountain"	1967	—	—	—	—	—	30	—	—	Non-album singles	Non-album single
"Marta" b/w "My World" (UK); "Oh How I Miss You" (US)	1967	—	—	—	—	—	20	—	—	Non-album singles	A: The Golden All Time Hits; UK B: Bachelors '68; US B: Non-album track
"Three O'Clock Flamingo Street" b/w "Learn to Live Without You"	1967	—	—	—	—	—	—	—	— 28	Non-album singles	Bachelors '68
"If Ever I Would Leave You" b/w "Cabaret"	1968	—	—	—	—	—	55 (Note: Chart position is from the official UK "Breakers List".)	—	—	Non-album singles	Non-album singles
"The Unicorn" b/w "You've Got to Say We're Through"	1968	—	40	—	—	—	—	—	—	Non-album singles	Non-album singles
"I'll Walk with God" b/w "I Can't Wish You Any More"	1968	—	—	—	—	—	—	—	—	Non-album singles	Non-album singles
"Turn Around, Look at Me" b/w "Lovers Such as I"	1968	—	—	—	—	—	—	—	—	Non-album singles	Non-album singles
"Where the Blue of the Night (Meets the Gold of the Day)" b/w "Caterina"	1969	—	—	—	—	—	—	—	—	Non-album singles	Non-album singles
"Punky's Dilemma" b/w "Arrivederci Maria" (UK); "It's a Beautiful Day" (US)	1969	—	—	—	—	—	—	—	—	Non-album singles	Non-album singles
"Everybody's Talkin'" b/w "Blaydon Races"	1969	—	—	—	—	—	—	—	—	Non-album singles	Non-album singles
"My First Love" b/w "Phil the Fluter"	1969	—	—	—	—	—	—	—	—	Non-album singles	Non-album singles
"(All of a Sudden) My Heart Sings" b/w "This Love (You Have Given Me)"	1970	—	—	—	—	—	—	—	—	Non-album singles	Non-album singles
"Love Is All" (US-only release) b/w "The Colours of Love"	1970	—	—	—	—	—	—	—	—	Non-album singles	Non-album singles
"Diamonds Are Forever" b/w "Where There's a Heartache"	1971	—	—	—	—	—	—	—	—	A: Stage and Screen Spectacular – 16 Great Songs; B: Non-album track	Non-album singles
"The Land of the Other Way Round" b/w "Children at Play"	1972	—	—	—	—	—	—	—	—	Non-album single	Non-album singles
"Suffer Little Children" b/w "Dear Father in Heaven"	1973	—	—	—	—	—	59	—	—	Bachelors '74	Non-album singles
"Sing Me a Song to Make Me Happy" b/w "Oh How I Miss You"	1974	—	—	—	—	—	—	—	—	Non-album singles	Non-album singles
"Roxie" b/w "Cigarettes, Whusky and Wild Wild Women"	1975	—	—	—	—	—	—	—	—	Non-album singles	Non-album singles
"Torn Between Two Lovers" b/w "Old Fashioned "B" Side"	1977	—	—	—	—	—	—	—	—	Non-album singles	Non-album singles
"Save the Last Dance for Me" b/w "Children and Flowers"	1977	—	—	—	—	—	—	—	—	Non-album singles	Non-album singles
"Travellin' Home" b/w "We Don't Have Those Feelings (Anymore)"	1979	—	—	—	—	—	—	—	—	Non-album singles	Non-album singles
"—" denotes releases that did not chart or were not released in that territory.
