= A Taste of Aggro =

1978 song by The Barron Knights

Single by the Barron Knights

from the album Night Gallery
- B-side: "Remember/Decimalization"
- Released: 17 November 1978
- Genre: Parody
- Length: 3:52
- Label: Epic
- Songwriters: Peter Langford; Frank Farian; George Reyam; Brent Dowe; James McNaughton; Pierre Kartner; Linlee; Brian Burke; Michael Coleman
- Producer: Peter Langford

The Barron Knights singles chronology
"Get Down Shep" (1978)	"A Taste of Aggro" (1978)	"Boozy Nights (Boogie Nights)" (1979)

"A Taste of Aggro" is a song recorded by the Barron Knights in 1978. The song peaked at number three on the UK Singles Chart.

== Background ==
The song was recorded by The Barron Knights, who were known for producing medleys of parodied songs, popular at the time. The band had originally made a name for themselves a decade prior with the medleys "Call Up the Groups", "Pop Go the Workers", and "Merry Gentle Pops". "A Taste of Aggro" parodied three songs which had been hits over the past year: "Rivers of Babylon" by Boney M., "The Smurf Song" by Father Abraham, and "Matchstalk Men and Matchstalk Cats and Dogs" by Brian and Michael.

The "Rivers of Babylon" section has been changed to showcase a person attending the dentist, parodying it as "There's a dentist in Birmingham". The crescendo "aaah" sound in "Rivers of Babylon" remains in the song, but is changed to sound like the patient is opening their mouth wider and wider for the dentist to see more into it, with each pause in-between having the dentist saying "Open wider please", and "And a little wider". The "Smurf song" section is written out as the Smurfs being portrayed as a group of bank robbers from Catford who have escaped from HM Prison Dartmoor, and ends with the members singing "la-la-la-la-la-la-la-la-la-laa" in the tune of the flute solo from the original song. The "Matchstalk Men and Matchstalk Cats and Dogs" section tells a story of a young Tottenham Hotspur F.C. fan (which is mentioned by Barron Knight member Peter Langford shortly before beginning the segment by saying "This is all about a Spurs supporter") that picks up an Aerosol paint can and paints his Grandad's bike and next door's cats and dogs, and ends with him slipping on his can, and his can blowing up. The song ends with the members singing the "la-la-la-la-la-la-la-la-la-laa" tune from the Smurfs song.

"A Taste of Aggro" is one of few Barron Knight songs to not have lead singer Duke D'Mond sing lead vocals on any of the song medleys, with him being demoted to backing vocals.

== Chart performance ==
The song peaked at number three on the UK Singles Chart, which resulted in the group performing the song on Top of the Pops twice. On the Irish charts, the song peaked at number 13.

== Personnel ==
- Duke D'Mond – backing vocals (all three songs)
- Peter Langford – backing vocals (songs 1, 2) lead vocals (song 3), guitar (all three songs)
- Butch Baker – role of dentist (song 1), police guard (song 2), backing vocals (song 3)
- Barron Antony – bass, backing vocals (all three songs)
- Dave Ballinger – drums, backing vocals (all three songs)

== Charts ==
Chart (1978–79)	Peak position
Ireland (IRMA)	13
New Zealand (Recorded Music NZ)	37
UK Singles (Official Charts)	3
