= List of Billboard number-one singles of 1955 =

This is a list of number-one songs in the United States during the year 1955 according to Billboard magazine. Prior to the creation of the Billboard Hot 100, Billboard published multiple singles charts each week. In 1955, the following five charts were produced:

- Best Sellers in Stores – ranked the biggest selling singles in retail stores, as reported by merchants surveyed throughout the country.
- Most Played by Jockeys – ranked the most played songs on United States radio stations, as reported by radio disc jockeys and radio stations.
- Most Played in Jukeboxes – ranked the most played songs in jukeboxes across the United States.
- Honor Roll of Hits – a composite ten-position song chart which combined data from the three charts above along with three other component charts. It served as The Billboard's lead chart until the introduction of the Hot 100 in 1958 and would remain in print until 1963.
- Top 100 - the first Billboard chart to feature a combined tabulation of sales, airplay and jukebox play (debuted in the issue dated November 12, 1955).

Issue date	Best Sellers in Stores	Most Played by Jockeys	Most Played in Jukeboxes	Honor Roll of Hits	Top 100	Ref.
January 1	"Mr. Sandman"; The Chordettes with Orchestra Conducted by Archie Bleyer	"Let Me Go Lover"; Joan Weber with Orchestra under direction of Jimmy Carroll	"Mr. Sandman"; The Chordettes with Orchestra Conducted by Archie Bleyer	"Mr. Sandman"	Introduced on November 12	
January 8	"Mr. Sandman"; The Chordettes with Orchestra Conducted by Archie Bleyer	"Mr. Sandman"; The Chordettes with Orchestra Conducted by Archie Bleyer	"Mr. Sandman"; The Chordettes with Orchestra Conducted by Archie Bleyer	"Mr. Sandman"	Introduced on November 12	
January 15	"Mr. Sandman"; The Chordettes with Orchestra Conducted by Archie Bleyer	"Let Me Go Lover"; Joan Weber with Orchestra under direction of Jimmy Carroll	"Let Me Go Lover"; Joan Weber with Orchestra under direction of Jimmy Carroll	"Let Me Go, Lover"	Introduced on November 12	
January 22	"Let Me Go Lover"; Joan Weber with Orchestra under direction of Jimmy Carroll	"Mr. Sandman"; The Chordettes with Orchestra Conducted by Archie Bleyer	"Let Me Go Lover"; Joan Weber with Orchestra under direction of Jimmy Carroll	"Let Me Go, Lover"	Introduced on November 12	
January 29	"Let Me Go Lover"; Joan Weber with Orchestra under direction of Jimmy Carroll	"Let Me Go Lover"; Joan Weber with Orchestra under direction of Jimmy Carroll	"Let Me Go Lover"; Joan Weber with Orchestra under direction of Jimmy Carroll	"Let Me Go, Lover"	Introduced on November 12	
February 5	"Hearts of Stone"; The Fontane Sisters with Billy Vaughn's Orchestra	"Let Me Go Lover"; Joan Weber with Orchestra under direction of Jimmy Carroll	"Let Me Go Lover"; Joan Weber with Orchestra under direction of Jimmy Carroll	"Let Me Go, Lover"	Introduced on November 12	
February 12	"Sincerely"; The McGuire Sisters with Chorus and Orchestra directed by Dick Jacobs	"Sincerely"; The McGuire Sisters with Chorus and Orchestra directed by Dick Jacobs	"Hearts of Stone"; The Fontane Sisters with Billy Vaughn's Orchestra	"Melody of Love"	Introduced on November 12	
February 19	"Sincerely"; The McGuire Sisters with Chorus and Orchestra directed by Dick Jacobs	"Sincerely"; The McGuire Sisters with Chorus and Orchestra directed by Dick Jacobs	"Hearts of Stone"; The Fontane Sisters with Billy Vaughn's Orchestra	"Melody of Love"	Introduced on November 12	
February 26	"Sincerely"; The McGuire Sisters with Chorus and Orchestra directed by Dick Jacobs	"Sincerely"; The McGuire Sisters with Chorus and Orchestra directed by Dick Jacobs	"Hearts of Stone"; The Fontane Sisters with Billy Vaughn's Orchestra	"Melody of Love"	Introduced on November 12	
March 5	"Sincerely"; The McGuire Sisters with Chorus and Orchestra directed by Dick Jacobs	"Sincerely"; The McGuire Sisters with Chorus and Orchestra directed by Dick Jacobs	"Sincerely"; The McGuire Sisters with Chorus and Orchestra directed by Dick Jacobs	"Melody of Love"	Introduced on November 12	
March 12	"Sincerely"; The McGuire Sisters with Chorus and Orchestra directed by Dick Jacobs	"Sincerely"; The McGuire Sisters with Chorus and Orchestra directed by Dick Jacobs	"Sincerely"; The McGuire Sisters with Chorus and Orchestra directed by Dick Jacobs	"Melody of Love"	Introduced on November 12	
March 19	"Sincerely"; The McGuire Sisters with Chorus and Orchestra directed by Dick Jacobs	"Sincerely"; The McGuire Sisters with Chorus and Orchestra directed by Dick Jacobs	"Sincerely"; The McGuire Sisters with Chorus and Orchestra directed by Dick Jacobs	"Melody of Love"	Introduced on November 12	
March 26	"The Ballad of Davy Crockett"; Bill Hayes with Orchestra Conducted by Archie Bleyer	"Sincerely"; The McGuire Sisters with Chorus and Orchestra directed by Dick Jacobs	"Sincerely"; The McGuire Sisters with Chorus and Orchestra directed by Dick Jacobs	"Melody of Love"	Introduced on November 12	
April 2	"The Ballad of Davy Crockett"; Bill Hayes with Orchestra Conducted by Archie Bleyer	"Sincerely"; The McGuire Sisters with Chorus and Orchestra directed by Dick Jacobs	"Sincerely"; The McGuire Sisters with Chorus and Orchestra directed by Dick Jacobs	"The Ballad of Davy Crockett"	Introduced on November 12	
April 9	"The Ballad of Davy Crockett"; Bill Hayes with Orchestra Conducted by Archie Bleyer	"Sincerely"; The McGuire Sisters with Chorus and Orchestra directed by Dick Jacobs	"Sincerely"; The McGuire Sisters with Chorus and Orchestra directed by Dick Jacobs	"The Ballad of Davy Crockett"	Introduced on November 12	
April 16	"The Ballad of Davy Crockett"; Bill Hayes with Orchestra Conducted by Archie Bleyer	"Sincerely"; The McGuire Sisters with Chorus and Orchestra directed by Dick Jacobs	"Sincerely"; The McGuire Sisters with Chorus and Orchestra directed by Dick Jacobs	"The Ballad of Davy Crockett"	Introduced on November 12	
April 23	"The Ballad of Davy Crockett"; Bill Hayes with Orchestra Conducted by Archie Bleyer	"The Ballad of Davy Crockett"; Bill Hayes with Orchestra Conducted by Archie Bleyer	"The Ballad of Davy Crockett"; Bill Hayes with Orchestra Conducted by Archie Bleyer	"The Ballad of Davy Crockett"	Introduced on November 12	
April 30	"Cherry Pink and Apple Blossom White"; Pérez Prado and His Orchestra	"The Ballad of Davy Crockett"; Bill Hayes with Orchestra Conducted by Archie Bleyer	"The Ballad of Davy Crockett"; Bill Hayes with Orchestra Conducted by Archie Bleyer	"The Ballad of Davy Crockett"	Introduced on November 12	
May 7	"Cherry Pink and Apple Blossom White"; Pérez Prado and His Orchestra	"The Ballad of Davy Crockett"; Bill Hayes with Orchestra Conducted by Archie Bleyer	"The Ballad of Davy Crockett"; Bill Hayes with Orchestra Conducted by Archie Bleyer	"The Ballad of Davy Crockett"	Introduced on November 12	
May 14	"Cherry Pink and Apple Blossom White"; Pérez Prado and His Orchestra	"Unchained Melody"; Les Baxter	"Dance With Me Henry (Wallflower)"; Georgia Gibbs with Glenn Osser and his Orchestra	"The Ballad of Davy Crockett"	Introduced on November 12	
May 21	"Cherry Pink and Apple Blossom White"; Pérez Prado and His Orchestra	"Cherry Pink and Apple Blossom White"; Pérez Prado and His Orchestra	"Dance With Me Henry (Wallflower)"; Georgia Gibbs with Glenn Osser and his Orchestra	"Unchained Melody"	Introduced on November 12	
May 28	"Cherry Pink and Apple Blossom White"; Pérez Prado and His Orchestra	"Cherry Pink and Apple Blossom White"; Pérez Prado and His Orchestra	"Dance With Me Henry (Wallflower)"; Georgia Gibbs with Glenn Osser and his Orchestra	"Unchained Melody"	Introduced on November 12	
June 4	"Cherry Pink and Apple Blossom White"; Pérez Prado and His Orchestra	"Unchained Melody"; Les Baxter	"Cherry Pink and Apple Blossom White"; Pérez Prado and His Orchestra	"Unchained Melody"	Introduced on November 12	
June 11	"Cherry Pink and Apple Blossom White"; Pérez Prado and His Orchestra	"Cherry Pink and Apple Blossom White"; Pérez Prado and His Orchestra	"Cherry Pink and Apple Blossom White"; Pérez Prado and His Orchestra	"Unchained Melody"	Introduced on November 12	
June 18	"Cherry Pink and Apple Blossom White"; Pérez Prado and His Orchestra	"Cherry Pink and Apple Blossom White"; Pérez Prado and His Orchestra	"Cherry Pink and Apple Blossom White"; Pérez Prado and His Orchestra	"Unchained Melody"	Introduced on November 12	
June 25	"Cherry Pink and Apple Blossom White"; Pérez Prado and His Orchestra	"Cherry Pink and Apple Blossom White"; Pérez Prado and His Orchestra	"Cherry Pink and Apple Blossom White"; Pérez Prado and His Orchestra	"Unchained Melody"	Introduced on November 12	
July 2	"Cherry Pink and Apple Blossom White"; Pérez Prado and His Orchestra	"Cherry Pink and Apple Blossom White"; Pérez Prado and His Orchestra	"Cherry Pink and Apple Blossom White"; Pérez Prado and His Orchestra	"Unchained Melody"	Introduced on November 12	
July 9	"Rock Around the Clock"; Bill Haley & His Comets	"Learnin' the Blues"; Frank Sinatra with Nelson Riddle and His Orchestra	"Cherry Pink and Apple Blossom White"; Pérez Prado and His Orchestra	"Unchained Melody"	Introduced on November 12	
July 16	"Rock Around the Clock"; Bill Haley & His Comets	"Rock Around the Clock"; Bill Haley & His Comets	"Cherry Pink and Apple Blossom White"; Pérez Prado and His Orchestra	"Unchained Melody"	Introduced on November 12	
July 23	"Rock Around the Clock"; Bill Haley & His Comets	"Rock Around the Clock"; Bill Haley & His Comets	"Cherry Pink and Apple Blossom White"; Pérez Prado and His Orchestra	"Rock Around the Clock"	Introduced on November 12	
July 30	"Rock Around the Clock"; Bill Haley & His Comets	"Learnin' the Blues"; Frank Sinatra with Nelson Riddle and His Orchestra	"Rock Around the Clock"; Bill Haley & His Comets	"Rock Around the Clock"	Introduced on November 12	
August 6	"Rock Around the Clock"; Bill Haley & His Comets	"Rock Around the Clock"; Bill Haley & His Comets	"Rock Around the Clock"; Bill Haley & His Comets	"Rock Around the Clock"	Introduced on November 12	
August 13	"Rock Around the Clock"; Bill Haley & His Comets	"Rock Around the Clock"; Bill Haley & His Comets	"Rock Around the Clock"; Bill Haley & His Comets	"Rock Around the Clock"	Introduced on November 12	
August 20	"Rock Around the Clock"; Bill Haley & His Comets	"Rock Around the Clock"; Bill Haley & His Comets	"Rock Around the Clock"; Bill Haley & His Comets	"Rock Around the Clock"	Introduced on November 12	
August 27	"Rock Around the Clock"; Bill Haley & His Comets	"Rock Around the Clock"; Bill Haley & His Comets	"Rock Around the Clock"; Bill Haley & His Comets	"Rock Around the Clock"	Introduced on November 12	
September 3	"The Yellow Rose of Texas"; Mitch Miller with his Orchestra & Chorus	"The Yellow Rose of Texas"; Mitch Miller with his Orchestra & Chorus	"Rock Around the Clock"; Bill Haley & His Comets	"Yellow Rose of Texas"	Introduced on November 12	
September 10	"The Yellow Rose of Texas"; Mitch Miller with his Orchestra & Chorus	"The Yellow Rose of Texas"; Mitch Miller with his Orchestra & Chorus	"Rock Around the Clock"; Bill Haley & His Comets	"Yellow Rose of Texas"	Introduced on November 12	
September 17	"The Yellow Rose of Texas"; Mitch Miller with his Orchestra & Chorus	"The Yellow Rose of Texas"; Mitch Miller with his Orchestra & Chorus	"Ain't That a Shame"; Pat Boone	"Yellow Rose of Texas"	Introduced on November 12	
September 24	"The Yellow Rose of Texas"; Mitch Miller with his Orchestra & Chorus	"The Yellow Rose of Texas"; Mitch Miller with his Orchestra & Chorus	"Ain't That a Shame"; Pat Boone	"Yellow Rose of Texas"	Introduced on November 12	
October 1	"The Yellow Rose of Texas"; Mitch Miller with his Orchestra & Chorus	"The Yellow Rose of Texas"; Mitch Miller with his Orchestra & Chorus	"The Yellow Rose of Texas"; Mitch Miller with his Orchestra & Chorus	"Yellow Rose of Texas"	Introduced on November 12	
October 8	"Love Is a Many-Splendored Thing"; The Four Aces featuring Al Alberts	"The Yellow Rose of Texas"; Mitch Miller with his Orchestra & Chorus	"The Yellow Rose of Texas"; Mitch Miller with his Orchestra & Chorus	"Yellow Rose of Texas"	Introduced on November 12	
October 15	"The Yellow Rose of Texas"; Mitch Miller with his Orchestra & Chorus	"Love Is a Many-Splendored Thing"; The Four Aces featuring Al Alberts	"The Yellow Rose of Texas"; Mitch Miller with his Orchestra & Chorus	"Yellow Rose of Texas"	Introduced on November 12	
October 22	"Love Is a Many-Splendored Thing"; The Four Aces featuring Al Alberts	"Love Is a Many-Splendored Thing"; The Four Aces featuring Al Alberts	"The Yellow Rose of Texas"; Mitch Miller with his Orchestra & Chorus	"Yellow Rose of Texas"	Introduced on November 12	
October 29	"Autumn Leaves"; Roger Williams with Orchestra Directed by Glenn Osser	"Love Is a Many-Splendored Thing"; The Four Aces featuring Al Alberts	"The Yellow Rose of Texas"; Mitch Miller with his Orchestra & Chorus	"Yellow Rose of Texas"	Introduced on November 12	
November 5	"Autumn Leaves"; Roger Williams with Orchestra Directed by Glenn Osser	"Love Is a Many-Splendored Thing"; The Four Aces featuring Al Alberts	"The Yellow Rose of Texas"; Mitch Miller with his Orchestra & Chorus	"Love Is a Many-Splendored Thing"	Introduced on November 12	
November 12	"Autumn Leaves"; Roger Williams with Orchestra Directed by Glenn Osser	"Love Is a Many-Splendored Thing"; The Four Aces featuring Al Alberts	"Love Is a Many-Splendored Thing"; The Four Aces featuring Al Alberts	"Love Is a Many-Splendored Thing"	"Love Is a Many-Splendored Thing"; The Four Aces featuring Al Alberts	
November 19	"Autumn Leaves"; Roger Williams with Orchestra Directed by Glenn Osser	"Love Is a Many-Splendored Thing"; The Four Aces featuring Al Alberts	"Love Is a Many-Splendored Thing"; The Four Aces featuring Al Alberts	"Autumn Leaves"	"Love Is a Many-Splendored Thing"; The Four Aces featuring Al Alberts	
November 26	"Sixteen Tons"; Tennessee Ernie Ford with Orchestra Conducted by Jack Fascinato	"Sixteen Tons"; Tennessee Ernie Ford with Orchestra Conducted by Jack Fascinato	"Love Is a Many-Splendored Thing"; The Four Aces featuring Al Alberts	"Sixteen Tons"	"Love Is a Many-Splendored Thing"; The Four Aces featuring Al Alberts	
December 3	"Sixteen Tons"; Tennessee Ernie Ford with Orchestra Conducted by Jack Fascinato	"Sixteen Tons"; Tennessee Ernie Ford with Orchestra Conducted by Jack Fascinato	"Sixteen Tons"; Tennessee Ernie Ford with Orchestra Conducted by Jack Fascinato	"Sixteen Tons"	"Sixteen Tons"; Tennessee Ernie Ford with Orchestra Conducted by Jack Fascinato	
December 10	"Sixteen Tons"; Tennessee Ernie Ford with Orchestra Conducted by Jack Fascinato	"Sixteen Tons"; Tennessee Ernie Ford with Orchestra Conducted by Jack Fascinato	"Sixteen Tons"; Tennessee Ernie Ford with Orchestra Conducted by Jack Fascinato	"Sixteen Tons"	"Sixteen Tons"; Tennessee Ernie Ford with Orchestra Conducted by Jack Fascinato	
December 17	"Sixteen Tons"; Tennessee Ernie Ford with Orchestra Conducted by Jack Fascinato	"Sixteen Tons"; Tennessee Ernie Ford with Orchestra Conducted by Jack Fascinato	"Sixteen Tons"; Tennessee Ernie Ford with Orchestra Conducted by Jack Fascinato	"Sixteen Tons"	"Sixteen Tons"; Tennessee Ernie Ford with Orchestra Conducted by Jack Fascinato	
December 24	"Sixteen Tons"; Tennessee Ernie Ford with Orchestra Conducted by Jack Fascinato	"Sixteen Tons"; Tennessee Ernie Ford with Orchestra Conducted by Jack Fascinato	"Sixteen Tons"; Tennessee Ernie Ford with Orchestra Conducted by Jack Fascinato	"Sixteen Tons"	"Sixteen Tons"; Tennessee Ernie Ford with Orchestra Conducted by Jack Fascinato	
December 31	"Sixteen Tons"; Tennessee Ernie Ford with Orchestra Conducted by Jack Fascinato	"Sixteen Tons"; Tennessee Ernie Ford with Orchestra Conducted by Jack Fascinato	"Sixteen Tons"; Tennessee Ernie Ford with Orchestra Conducted by Jack Fascinato	"Sixteen Tons"	"Sixteen Tons"; Tennessee Ernie Ford with Orchestra Conducted by Jack Fascinato	

== See also ==
- 1955 in music
