= Georgie Shaw =

- Birth name: George Shoester
- Born: 1930
- Died: September 1, 2006 (aged 75–76); Philadelphia, Pennsylvania, United States
- Genres: Pop
- Occupation: Singer
- Labels: Decca Records

Georgie Shaw, born George Shoester (1930 – September 1, 2006) in Philadelphia, Pennsylvania, was an American popular musician.

== Biography ==
=== Career ===
Shaw recorded a song called "Let Me Go, Devil", written in 1953, which was about alcoholism. It was later rewritten as "Let Me Go, Lover!". Another song that he originally recorded, which later became a hit when recorded by another singer, was "Honeycomb". He released four Top 40 singles in the U.S. in the 1950s, all on Decca Records. "Till We Two Are One" was his biggest hit, reaching No. 7 in 1954. That same year, "Somebody Else's Love Song" reached No. 29. Jimmy Leyden and his orchestra and chorus accompanied Shawe on those two recordings. "No Arms Can Ever Hold You (like These Arms of Mine)" reached No. 23 on the Billboard Hot 100 in 1955, and "Go On with the Wedding", featuring Kitty Kallen, reached No. 39 in 1956. Jack Pleis led the orchestra behind the last two recordings.

Shaw died on September 1, 2006, in Philadelphia due to heart disease.
