= Pop Go the Workers =

1965 single by the Barron Knights

Single by the Barron Knights with Duke D'Mond
- B-side: "Pop Go the Workers" (Part 2)
- Released: 19 March 1965
- Genre: Parody; novelty
- Length: 2:43
- Label: Columbia
- Songwriter(s): Willie Dixon; Holland-Dozier-Holland; Major Bill Smith; Curtis Kirk; Bill Taylor

The Barron Knights with Duke D'Mond singles chronology
"The House of Johann Strauss" (1964)	"Pop Go the Workers" (1965)	"It Was a Very Good Year" (1965)

"Pop Go the Workers" is a song by British humorous group the Barron Knights released as a single in March 1965. It became a top-ten hit in the UK and was awarded a silver disc by Disc for sales of over 250,000 copies.

== Background and release ==
After the success of the Barron Knights' medley "Call Up the Groups" in 1964, the following year they released another medley entitled "Pop Go the Workers" featuring songs that had recently been hits in the UK. Part one is a medley of "Little Red Rooster" which had been a hit for the Rolling Stones, "Baby Love" by the Supremes and "I Won't Trade You for the World" by the Bachelors; part two is a medley of "Girl Don't Come" by Sandie Shaw, "Walk Tall" by Val Doonican and "Love Me Do" by the Beatles. The lyrics were rewritten to jokingly reimagine what famous groups such as the Rolling Stones, the Supremes and the Bachelors would do if the beat music boom disappeared and they suddenly fell out of favour and had to find other employment.

According to Barron Antony, "Pop Go the Workers" came about as an accident – "We were booked to appear on TV's 'Crackerjack' show and the producer asked if we could include an impersonation number. Although it was still a bit rough, we did 'Pop Go The Workers.' That was on the Friday. By Monday EMI orders had 30,000 for the record – and we hadn't even recorded it!"

== Track listing ==
7": Columbia / DB 7525

1. "Pop Go the Workers" (Part 1) – 2:43
2. "Pop Go the Workers" (Part 2) – 2:33

== Charts ==
Chart (1965)	Peak position
Australia (Kent Music Report)	47
Ireland (IRMA)	7
Rhodesia (Lyons Maid)	3
UK Disc Top 30	5
UK Melody Maker Pop 50	5
UK New Musical Express Top 30	7
UK Record Retailer Top 50	5
