= Merry Gentle Pops =

1965 single by the Barron Knights

Single by the Barron Knights with Duke D'Mond
- B-side: "Merry Gentle Pops" (Part 2)
- Released: 26 November 1965
- Genre: Parody; novelty
- Length: 3:04
- Label: Columbia
- Songwriter(s): Barron Knights; Donovan; John D. Loudermilk; Jagger–Richards

The Barron Knights with Duke D'Mond singles chronology
"It Was a Very Good Year" (1965)	"Merry Gentle Pops" (1965)	"Round the World Rhythm and Blues" (1966)

"Merry Gentle Pops" is a song by British humorous group the Barron Knights. It was released as a single in November 1965 and became a top-ten hit in the UK.

== Background and release ==
"Merry Gentle Pops" is a Christmas-themed song and is the third medley by the Barron Knights after "Call Up the Groups" and "Pop Go the Workers". Part one is a medley of the Barron Knights' "Pop Stars Party", "Catch the Wind" by Donovan, "This Little Bird", which had recently been a hit for Marianne Faithful, and "(I Can't Get No) Satisfaction" by the Rolling Stones. Part two is a medley of "Look Through Any Window" by the Hollies, "Tossing and Turning" by the Ivy League, and "Goodbyeee" by Peter Cook and Dudley Moore.

It was released as a single in November 1965 and became the group's third top ten hit, peaking at number nine on the Record Retailer chart. It became their last top-ten hit until their resurgence in 1977 with "Live in Trouble".

== Track listing ==
7": Columbia / DB 7780

1. "Merry Gentle Pops" (Part 1) – 3:04
2. "Merry Gentle Pops" (Part 2) – 2:11

== Charts ==
Chart (1965–1966)	Peak position
Australia (Kent Music Report)	79
UK Disc Top 30	6
UK Melody Maker Pop 50	6
UK New Musical Express Top 30	10
UK Record Retailer Top 50	9
