= The Barron Knights =

Comedy rock band

- Origin: Leighton Buzzard, Bedfordshire, England
- Genres: Pop rock; comedy rock
- Years active: 1959–2022
- Labels: Columbia, Epic
- Members: Peter Langford; Len Crawley; Lloyd Courtenay; Micky Groome
- Past members: Barron Antony; Don Ringsell; John “Judge” Hopkins; Dave Morrow; Duke D’Mond; Butch Baker; Howie Conder; Bill Sharky; Dave Ballinger

The Barron Knights are a British humorous pop rock group, originally formed in 1959 in Leighton Buzzard, Bedfordshire, as the Knights of the Round Table.

== Career ==
The Barron Knights started out as a straight pop group, and spent a couple of years touring and playing in English dance halls before making their way to Hamburg, Germany. Bill Wyman, later of the Rolling Stones, has written that the Barron Knights were the first group he saw with an electric bass, at a performance in Aylesbury in July 1961, inspiring him to take up the instrument. In 1963, at the invitation of Brian Epstein, they were one of the support acts at the Beatles' Christmas shows at the Finsbury Park Astoria in London, and later became one of the few acts to tour with both the Beatles and the Rolling Stones. Their debut single was "Let's Face It" / "Never Miss Chris" released in 1962 by Fontana Records (H.368). They also made their debut on BBC Television in that year, performing on the children's programme Let's Go!.

They first came to fame in 1964 with the number "Call Up the Groups" (Parts 1 and 2). It overcame copyright restrictions and parodied a number of the leading pop groups of the time including the Searchers, Freddie and the Dreamers, the Dave Clark Five, the Bachelors, the Rolling Stones, and the Beatles. The song imagined the various artists singing about being conscripted, or "called up" into the British Army, although actual conscription had ended in 1960. The single climbed to number three on the UK singles chart. As an example, the song "Bits and Pieces" by the Dave Clark Five was parodied as "Boots and Blisters". They then followed this parody theme with two more hit singles, "Pop Go the Workers" (1965) and "Merry Gentle Pops" (1966), while continuing to work the cabaret circuit, as they do internationally to this day.

In 1967, the group released the single "Lazy Fat People", a satirical song written by Pete Townshend of the Who. In 1974 they toured South Africa with Petula Clark. By 1977 CBS Records had signed the group, bringing a resurgence in popularity, with "Live in Trouble" reaching number seven on the UK singles chart. It was their first hit for over nine years. "Angelo" was just one song parodied on "Live in Trouble", the others being "You Make Me Feel Like Dancing", and "Float On". Their 1978 release "A Taste of Aggro", which parodied "Rivers of Babylon", "Matchstalk Men and Matchstalk Cats and Dogs" and "The Smurf Song", became the group's biggest hit with sales of over one million, reaching number three on the UK chart.

They achieved four other UK hit singles in the 1960s and 1970s, but only one of their singles charted on the US Billboard Hot 100. This was "The Topical Song", another comedic parody, written by the American poet Robert Spring White, and based upon Supertramp's "The Logical Song". White, who also took the 1980 American Song Festival award in the folk category for "Where Does The River Go", confined his humorous lyric compositions to the Barron Knights.

The group also produced Christmas specials on Channel 4 Television in 1983 and 1984 (which continued to be repeated throughout the decade), a mix of sketches and songs with a comedy backbone for which the group brought in comedy writer Barry Faulkner (the Grumbleweeds, Tom O'Connor, Week Ending, Russ Abbot's Madhouse) to write sketches and links. In 1986, they sang a parody of the Jimmy Dean song "Big Bad John", called "Big Bad Bond". It was a tongue-in-cheek reference to the Australian entrepreneur Alan Bond and his involvement in Australia's victory in the 1983 America's Cup. The single was released by WEA, and had "The Loan Arranger" on the B-side; both were taken from their album California Girls.

As of 2013, the group continued to perform for a worldwide audience, with a line-up featuring only Pete Langford from the original band members. Founding member Barron Antony retired on 5 October 1985, and fellow founding member Butch Baker retired in January 2007, being replaced by Len Crawley. The Barron Knights' original lead singer, Duke D'Mond, died on 9 April 2009. Dave Ballinger died in Ocoee, Florida on 27 March 2026, aged 87.

== Original band member details ==
- Barron Antony (born Anthony Michael John Osmond, 15 June 1934, RAF Abingdon, Abingdon, Berkshire, England) – bassist, vocalist
- Peter 'Peanut' Langford (born 10 April 1943, Durham, England) – guitar, keyboards, vocalist
- Duke D'Mond (born Richard Edward Palmer, 25 February 1943, Dunstable, Bedfordshire, England, died 9 April 2009, Oxford) – vocalist
- Butch Baker (born Leslie John Baker, 16 July 1941, Amersham, Buckinghamshire, England) – lead guitarist, vocalist
- Dave Ballinger (born David Alan Ballinger, 17 January 1939, Slough, Berkshire, England, died 27 March 2026, Ocoee, Florida) – drummer

== Discography ==
=== Albums ===
Year	Title	Details	Peak chart positions
Year	Title	Details	UK
1964	Call Up the Groups	Released: 1964; Label: Columbia; Released as The Barron Knights with Duke D'Mond	—
1966	The Barron=Knights	Released: 1966; Label: Columbia; Released as The Barron Knights with Duke D'Mond	—
1967	Scribed	Released: November 1967; Label: Columbia	—
1972	One Man's Meat	Released: 1972; Label: Penny Farthing	—
1972	Songs from Their Shows	Released: 1972; Label: Tavern	—
1973	Barron Knights	Released: 1973; Label: Tavern	—
1974	Odd on Favourites	Released: 1974; Label: Tavern	—
1975	Knights of Laughter	Released: 1975; Label: Penny Farthing	—
1975	The Barron Knights	Released: 1975; Label: Tavern	—
1977	Live in Trouble	Released: 1977; Label: Epic	—
1978	Night Gallery	Released: 1978; Label: Epic	15
1979	Teach the World to Laugh	Released: 1979; Label: Epic	51
1980	Jesta Giggle	Released: 1980; Label: Epic	45
1981	Easy Listening	Released: 1981; Label: Tavern	—
1981	The Barron Knights (Cheers from Dave Duke Butch Barron & Pete)	Released: 1981; Label: Tavern	—
1981	Twisting the Knights Away	Released: 1981; Label: Epic	—
1983	Funny in the Head	Released: November 1983; Label: Epic	—
1986	California Girls	Released: 1986; Label: WEA	—
1987	Don't Let the Germans Pinch Your Sunbeds!	Released: 1987; Label: –	—
1999	Songs for Traffic Jams	Released: 1999; Label: Prestige	—
"—" denotes releases that did not chart.

=== Singles ===
Year	Single	Peak chart positions					
Year	Single	AUS	CAN	IRE	NZ	UK	US
1962	"Let's Face It" (as the Barron Knights with Duke D'Mond)	—	—	—	—	—	—
1963	"Jo-Anne" (as the Barron Knights with Duke D'Mond)	—	—	—	—	—	—
1964	"Comin' Home Baby" (as the Barron Knights with Duke D'Mond)	—	—	—	—	—	—
1964	"Call Up the Groups" (as the Barron Knights with Duke D'Mond)	28	—	2	—	3	—
1964	"Come to the Dance (as the Barron Knights with Duke D'Mond)	—	—	—	—	42	—
1964	"The House of Johann Strauss" (as the Barron Knights with Duke D'Mond)	17	—	—	—	—	—
1965	"Pop Go the Workers" (as the Barron Knights with Duke D'Mond)	47	—	7	—	5	—
1965	"It Was a Very Good Year" (as the Barron Knights with Duke D'Mond)	—	—	—	—	—	—
1965	"Merry Gentle Pops" (as the Barron Knights with Duke D'Mond)	79	—	—	—	9	—
1966	"Round the World Rhythm and Blues" (as the Barron Knights with Duke D'Mond)	—	—	—	—	—	—
1966	"Doing What She's Not Supposed to Do"	—	—	—	—	—	—
1966	"Under New Management"	70	—	—	—	15	—
1967	"Lazy Fat People"	—	—	—	—	—	—
1967	"Here Come the Bees"	—	—	—	—	—	—
1968	"I Never Will Marry"	—	—	—	—	—	—
1968	"An Olympic Record"	84	—	—	—	35	—
1969	"Love and the World Loves with You"	—	—	—	—	—	—
1969	"I've Got You Under My Skin" (Australia-only release)	—	—	—	—	—	—
1970	"Traces"	—	—	—	—	—	—
1971	"Hey Ho! Europe"	—	—	—	—	—	—
1971	"Popumentary '71"	—	—	—	—	—	—
1972	"You're All I Need"	—	85	—	—	—	—
1972	"To the Woods"	—	—	—	—	—	—
1973	"Turning My Back on You"	—	—	—	—	—	—
1973	"Bottle on the Shelf" (Australia and New Zealand-only release)	—	—	—	—	—	—
1974	"Hatters, Hatters" (with the Luton Town Squad)	—	—	—	—	—	—
1974	"The Ballad of Frank Spencer"	—	—	—	—	—	—
1977	"Live in Trouble"	77	—	11	—	7	—
1978	"Back in Trouble Again"	—	—	—	—	—	—
1978	"Get Down Shep"	—	—	—	—	—	—
1978	"A Taste of Aggro"	—	—	13	37	3	—
1979	"Boozy Nights (Boogie Nights)"	—	—	—	—	—	—
1979	"The Topical Song (Logical Song)"	97	—	—	—	—	70
1979	"Food for Thought"	—	—	—	38	46	—
1980	"We Know Who Done It (Pt 1) (Cars)"	99	—	—	—	—	—
1980	"The Sit Song" (parodying dog trainer Barbara Woodhouse)	—	—	—	—	44	—
1980	"Never Mind the Presents"	37	—	—	45	17	—
1981	"Mr. Rubik"	—	—	—	—	—	—
1981	"Blackboard Jumble"	—	—	—	—	52	—
1982	"It Happened Down Under" (Australia-only release)	—	—	—	—	—	—
1982	"Du'Wot?"	—	—	—	—	—	—
1983	"Buffalo Bill's Last Scratch"	—	—	—	—	49	—
1983	"Full Circle"	—	—	—	—	—	—
1984	"Churchill Rap"	—	—	—	—	—	—
1985	"Mr. Bronski Meets Mr. Evans (I Feel Love)"	—	—	—	—	—	—
1986	"R-R-Rock Me Father Christmas"	—	—	—	—	—	—
1986	"California Girls" (Australia-only release)	—	—	—	—	—	—
1986	"Big Bad Bond (Big Bad John)" (Australia-only release)	—	—	—	—	—	—
1989	"Wot a Mix Up!"	—	—	—	—	—	—
1999	"The Golden Oldie Old Folks Home"	—	—	—	—	—	—
"—" denotes releases that did not chart or were not released in that territory.

== See also ==
- List of Epic Records artists
- List of performances on Top of the Pops
- List of songs about London
