= Major Bill Smith =

Background information
- Born: William Arthur Smith; January 21, 1922; Checotah, Oklahoma, United States
- Died: September 12, 1994 (aged 72) Fort Worth, Texas, United States
- Occupations: Record producer, songwriter, record label owner
- Years active: Mid-1950s–1980s
- Labels: LeCam, LeBill, Charay, Soft, Austin, Bayou, Billie Fran, Bix International, Black Sheep, Bobill, Brownfield, Campo, Christi, Country Disco!, International Sounds, Jade, Jenko, Karat, Lanar, Maridene, Pastel, Psycho-Suavé, Robbie, Shah, Shalimar, Sultan, Tamara, Tiris, Titanic 80, Troy, Twinkle, Zuma.

William Arthur Smith (January 21, 1922 – September 12, 1994), known as Major Bill Smith, was an American record producer, publisher, promoter, songwriter, and record label owner based in Fort Worth, Texas.

== Biography ==
He was born in Checotah, Oklahoma, and grew up listening to country and gospel music. In the Second World War he worked in a bomber factory before joining the United States Army Air Forces and being posted to England. As a B-17 navigator, he flew combat missions over Germany, and was wounded during his 33rd mission. He retired as a Major and after the war he became a public relations officer at Carswell Air Force Base in Fort Worth, Texas, and began writing songs for local musicians. He also claimed to have worked for Don Robey, promoting records on Robey's Duke and Peacock labels, as well as producing some records himself by R&B singer Joe Hinton and others. His first success came as the writer of Sonny James' 1956 hit, "Twenty Feet of Muddy Water".

There is some uncertainty over details of his life, and he has been described as "a relentless self-promoter who seemed disinclined to let the facts get in the way of a good story". He left the military in 1959, but used the designation Major in all his later dealings. He set up the LeCam record label and production company in Fort Worth with George Campbell; the name derived from that of Smith's wife Letitia, and Campbell.

After several local hits, and reputedly turning down a young singer named John Deutschendorf (later known as John Denver), his first national success came in 1962 as producer of Bruce Channel's hit "Hey! Baby", on which one of Smith's protégés, Delbert McClinton, played harmonica. On that and other records, Smith's assistant Marvin "Smokey" Montgomery has also been credited as producer. The following year, Smith was approached by college students Ray Hildebrand and Jill Jackson, and recorded the duo immediately on hearing their song. As "Hey Paula", credited to Paul and Paula, it became an international hit. Smith's third major hit as a credited producer was "Last Kiss", recorded by J. Frank Wilson and the Cavaliers in 1964. He also co-wrote "I Wouldn't Trade You for the World", a No. 1 hit on the Irish charts for The Bachelors in October 1964. Other acts produced by Smith included Larry & the Blue Notes, Bobby Skel (Skelton), T-Bone Walker, The Legendary Stardust Cowboy, and Gene Summers.

Smith set up several music publishing companies, record labels, and promotion companies besides LeCam, including Charay Records and LeBill Music Inc., logging some 3,000 releases over his 30-year career and garnering four gold and one platinum record awards. He also preached and raised funds for charity at the Union Gospel Mission in Fort Worth.

In later years, he achieved some notoriety for circulating tapes which he claimed proved that Elvis Presley had not died in 1977 but was still alive. In 1983 Smith initiated a legal action against Elvis Presley Enterprises, claiming it was interfering with his ability to publish a book about Presley; it was eventually published privately as Elvis Lives along with two other books, Memphis Mystery Part I and Memphis Mystery Part II.

Smith died in Texas in 1994, aged 72.

== Selected discography ==
- Elvis Lives (Le Cam 1835A)
- The Hits & Misses of Major Bill Smith (Le Cam LCS-303)
- Texas Gold as Mined by Major Bill Smith (Le Cam LC-303)
