= Stevie Riks =

British comedian, writer, voice-over artist and musician

Stevie Riks (born in Ellesmere Port, Cheshire, England) is a comedian, impressionist, comedy writer and performer, artist who paints acrylic on canvas artwork of the artists he impersonates, voice-over artist and musician.

== Career ==
Stevie Riks began his career as a solo artist, performing locally. He has since built a large internet following, attracting more than 50 million views and 100,000 subscribers on YouTube and over 162,000 Facebook Followers.

Riks fronted various bands before going solo, following his performance on Central Television's New Faces in 1988. where he won the highest score ever recorded on the show.

More TV appearances followed, and in 1995 while filming Who Do You Do for Sky TV Riks was approached by the manager representing the 1960s band The Rockin' Berries, who enlisted him as their front man. He then toured the world for five years, working venues throughout Europe, Hong Kong and the Middle East.

Riks returned to his solo career, launching his self-written one-man performance "The Stevie Riks Show" in 2000. Over the next few years, he toured clubs and theatres. In his career, he has performed at some of the United Kingdom's most prestigious venues – including Wembley Arena, London's Grosvenor House Hotel, The Café Royal and The Savoy as well as appearing in The Ken Dodd Laughter Show and Ricky Tomlinson's Variety Show.

In 2005 Stevie Riks was the voice of "Pondlife" on the single "Ring Ding Ding" – which reached No. 11 in the UK singles chart – in competition with Crazy Frog on the track.

By 2008 Riks was featured and interviewed on the BBC television magazine programme Inside Out – as he had become the most-viewed comedian on YouTube in the UK.

Also in 2008 Riks worked with Bob Mortimer of Pett Productions, writing and performing on the ITV programme The All Star Impressions Show. He portrayed Paul McCartney, Paul O'Grady, Noel Gallagher, Russell Brand and Tom Jones for ITV.

Stevie Riks continues work as a voice-over artist, and has provided celebrity and character vocals for clients including Virgin Radio, Opera Telecom, Alton Towers (character voices), Flamingo Land Resort as well as radio voice-over work and international radio advertisements.

== Career detail and highlights ==
Riks hosted "The Liverpool Beatles Mathew Street Festival" from 2009 through 2012, where he compered and performed as John, Paul, George and Ringo. He has branded himself as "The One-Man Beatles" as his video impersonations incorporate each of The Beatles together, as well as individually. Riks released a self-penned album titled Songs from the Parlour and was a co-writer on a 2008 Christmas single performed by Davy Jones of The Monkees.

In 2011 Riks was interviewed by the Liverpool Echo about his childhood home in Ellesmere Port.

In May 2016 Riks' vocals on his take of David Bowie singing "My Way" – Bowie's attempt to write the song for Frank Sinatra and re-creating it on "Life on Mars?" were featured newspapers and trade magazines including Rolling Stone, NME and Billboard. The confusion caused in the music world began with Riks' vocals being replaced by pictures of Bowie on a YouTube video by an unknown source, credited as Bowie's "newly discovered, unreleased music" and had to be subsequently retracted by the media outlets.

Also in 2016, Riks recorded several video comedy sketches on the streets of London with producer and cameraman Tony Briggs for Comedy Central.

== Advocacy ==
Riks is an animal rights activist who has taken part in protests to protect wildlife and spends his time advocating for animals as well as creating and selling acrylic and pastel artwork of the rock and pop personalities he respects and impersonates.
