= Autumn Leaves (1945 song) =

Song by Joseph Kosma

"Les Feuilles mortes"

Song by Jacques Prévert and Joseph Kosma, English lyrics by Johnny Mercer
- English title: "Autumn Leaves"
- Written: 1945
- Released: 1946 by Enoch & Cie (Enoch (édition musicale))
- Genre: Chanson, jazz, pop
- Composer: Joseph Kosma
- Lyricists: Jacques Prévert (French), Johnny Mercer (English)

"Autumn Leaves" is the English-language lyrical adaptation of the French song "Les Feuilles mortes" ("The Dead Leaves") composed by Joseph Kosma in 1945. The original lyrics were written by Jacques Prévert in French, and in 1950 Johnny Mercer wrote the English lyrics. An instrumental recording by pianist Roger Williams topped the US Billboard charts of 1955.

Since its introduction, "Autumn Leaves" has become a jazz standard, and it is one of the most recorded songs by jazz musicians. More than a thousand commercial recordings are known to have been released by mainstream jazz and pop musicians.

== Background ==
Kosma was a native of Hungary who was introduced to Prévert in Paris, and they collaborated on the song "Les Feuilles mortes". The song was legally deposited in 1945, and published in 1947. The song has its origin in the ballet music written by Kosma for Le Rendez-vous by Roland Petit, performed in Paris at the end of the Second World War. Large parts of the melodies are exactly the same as the ballet music, which was itself partially similar to "Poème d'octobre No. 4" by Jules Massenet. This portion of the tune has also been noted to be near-identical to a passage in Tchaikovsky's 1888 composition Hamlet Overture-Fantasia, Op. 67. Marcel Carné used "Les Feuilles mortes" for the 1946 film Les Portes de la nuit (Gates of the Night), where it was sung/hummed in parts by Irène Joachim and Yves Montand.

The most successful commercial recording of "Les Feuilles mortes" was by Yves Montand (Columbia) in 1949, which sold a million copies within 5 years. Cora Vaucaire recorded it (1947 or 1948), as did Juliette Gréco who first recorded a version in 1949.

In 1950, Johnny Mercer wrote the English lyrics and gave it the title "Autumn Leaves". The English lyrics are significantly shorter than the French version, consisting of only two verses, and are not a literal translation but rather have a different meaning. In the French original, the crucial line "C'est une chanson" starts at the 13th bar, while in English the line "the autumn leaves" starts at bar 1. Mercer was a founder and partner in Capitol Records at the time, and he selected Capitol recording artist Jo Stafford to make the first English-language recording in July, 1950.

== Structure and chord progression ==
"Autumn Leaves"
Sample of a recording of "Autumn Leaves" by Eva Cassidy from the album Live at Blues Alley (1996)

The song is in AABC form. "Autumn Leaves" offers a popular way for beginning jazz musicians to become acquainted with jazz harmony as the chord progression consists almost solely of ii–V–I and ii–V sequences which are typical of jazz. Although it is mostly played in G minor, the original key of the composition was A minor.

The A section's melody and chord symbols in the key of G minor is:

In roman numeral analysis, this progression is:

iv^{7} – bVII^{7} – bIII^{maj7} – bVI^{maj7} – ii^{ø} – V^{7} – i

and is an example of the circle-of-fifths progression.

== Roger Williams' recording ==
"Autumn Leaves"

Single by Roger Williams

from the album Autumn Leaves
- B-side: "Take Care"
- Released: June 1955
- Genre: Pop
- Length: 2:59
- Label: Kapp
- Composer: Joseph Kosma
- Lyricists: Jacques Prévert, Johnny Mercer

Roger Williams singles chronology
"Autumn Leaves" (1955)	"Wanting You" (1955)

Roger Williams was signed by Dave Kapp of Kapp Records when he heard Williams playing in a hotel lounge. He was asked to change his birth name Louis Jacob Weertz to Roger Williams. Williams released an album The Boy Next Door, which failed to make an impact, and then the song "Autumn Leaves". "Autumn Leaves" was recorded at the suggestion of Kapp one Friday, and Williams, who had previously thought that the song was titled "Falling Leaves", said: "The first thing that came to mind was to play all those runs down the keyboard, I tried to make it sound like falling leaves." He created the arrangement that Friday and the following Saturday night, and recorded the song on Monday. Williams played the tune with descending arpeggios its dominant feature, backed by an orchestra conducted by Glenn Osser. The first recording was just over 3 minutes long, and Kapp suggested that it be sped up to keep it under 3 minutes, which Williams duly did.

The song became a number-one hit in the U.S. in 1955, the first piano instrumental to reach number one. It stayed at No. 1 for four weeks in the bestsellers chart. The song is said to have sold two million copies around the world, and it remains the best-selling piano record of all time.

Williams re-recorded the tune for Kapp, in stereo and with choral and orchestral backings, to celebrate its 10th anniversary in 1965. Released as "Autumn Leaves '65" it peaked at No. 10 on the Billboard Easy Listening chart, while also reaching No. 92 on their Hot 100 chart.

=== Charts ===
Chart (1955)	Peak position
US Best Seller in Stores (Billboard)	1
US Best-Selling Singles (Cash Box)	1

== Other versions ==
The song was recorded steadily throughout the 1950s by leading pop vocalists including Steve Conway (1950), Bing Crosby (1950), Nat King Cole (included in the 1955 album re-release of Nat King Cole Sings for Two in Love, and used in the 1956 film Autumn Leaves whose title was inspired by the song), Doris Day (1956), and Frank Sinatra (1957). It was also used in the 1959 film Hey Boy! Hey Girl! performed by Louis Prima and Keely Smith.

Following the success of Roger Williams' version of the tune, competing pop versions were released late in 1955 by Steve Allen, the Ray Charles Singers, Jackie Gleason, Mitch Miller, and Victor Young, with only Allen's reaching the Billboard Top 40.

A half-French half-English version was released by Édith Piaf in 1951.

The song was also quickly adopted by many instrumental jazz artists, including Artie Shaw (1950); Stan Getz (1952); Cal Tjader in his 1954 album Mambo with Tjader with Cal Tjader's Modern Mambo Quintet; Ahmad Jamal (1955); Erroll Garner in his 1955 album Concert by the Sea; Duke Ellington (1957, Ellington Indigos); Cannonball Adderley in his 1958 album Somethin' Else, featuring Miles Davis, who also recorded it live for Miles Davis in Europe in 1964; Vince Guaraldi (1958); Bill Evans (1959, Portrait in Jazz); John Coltrane (1962); and Ryo Fukui (1976).

Guaraldi later recorded "Autumn Leaves" with bassist Ron McClure and drummer Mike Clark at Wally Heider Studios in San Francisco in October 1973. Different takes from the session were released posthumously on North Beach (2006) and It's a Mystery, Charlie Brown (soundtrack) (2026).

It became the signature tune of Ben Webster in his later career. A few jazz vocalists have also recorded the song, including Sarah Vaughan on her 1982 album Crazy and Mixed Up.

Composer Terry Riley wrote a contrafact of the song in 1965, using the same principle of small repetitive cells of melody and rhythm first used in his breakthrough piece, In C (1964).

In 2012, jazz historian Philippe Baudoin called the song "the most important non-American standard" and noted that "it has been recorded about 1400 times by mainstream and modern jazz musicians alone and is the eighth most-recorded tune by jazzmen."

The song is the official corps song of the Bluecoats Drum and Bugle Corps.
