= The Rockin' Berries =

Pop group

- Genres: Beat, pop, rock, comedy, novelty
- Years active: 1961–present
- Labels: Piccadilly, Pye
- Members: Geoff Turton; Simon Ryland; Jay McGee
- Past members: Rick Price; Chuck Botfield; Terry Bond; Doug Thompson; Paul Hewitt; Tim Munns; Dennis Ryland; Jimmy Powell; Clive Lea; Roy Austin; Bobby Thomson; Ken Rodway; Pete Spooner; Steven Lawrence; Rod Clarke; Terry Webster; Stevie Riks; Keith Smart; John Dawson; Derek Jason; Noel Hazell; Dennis Lewty

The Rockin' Berries are a beat group from Birmingham, England, who had several hit records in the UK in the 1960s. A version of the group, emphasising comedy routines as well as music, continues to perform to the present day.

== History ==
The Rockin' Berries were originally formed as a beat group at Turves Green School in Birmingham in the late 1950s by guitarist Bryan "Chuck" Botfield, and were so named because they played several Chuck Berry songs in their set. An early keyboard player with the group was Christine Perfect, later Christine McVie of Fleetwood Mac. When another band was formed locally, by singer Paul Hewitt, guitarist Doug Thompson and drummer Terry Bond, Botfield agreed to join on condition that it used the "Rockin' Berries" name. By mid 1961, the group comprised Botfield (lead guitar), Doug Thompson (rhythm guitar), Tim Munns (bass), Dennis Ryland (saxophone), Terry Bond (drums), and singers Paul Hewitt and Jimmy Powell. Later that year, the group went to Germany to play a series of club engagements, with Hewitt being replaced by singer and Elvis Presley impressionist Clive Lea. On their return, the group auditioned for promoter Jack Good, who wanted to sign Powell but not the rest of the group. After a few months, Powell left for a solo career, later leading the Five Dimensions who for a while included Rod Stewart. Thompson, Ryland and shortly afterwards Munns also left, and were replaced by singer and guitarist Geoff Turton — an old friend of Botfield's — and bassist Roy Austin.

When the group returned to England, they won a contract with Decca Records, who released their first two singles, "Wah Wah Woo" and "Itty Bitty Pieces" in 1963. Although the group appeared on TV show Ready Steady Go!, the records were not hits, and the group, now managed by John Schroeder, signed a deal with Pye Records subsidiary Piccadilly. Their first record for the new label, "I Didn't Mean To Hurt You", reached No. 43 on the UK singles chart, and the band appeared at the Marquee Club in London where they were seen by American record producer Kim Fowley. He suggested they record a version of "He's in Town", a Goffin and King song that had been a US hit for The Tokens. The Rockin' Berries' version reached No. 3 in the UK in late 1964, and the follow-up records, "What In The World’s Come Over You" (No. 23) and "Poor Man’s Son" (No. 5) were also hits. They also released a successful album, In Town. At this point, Roy Austin left the group and was replaced by Bobby Thomson, previously of Rory Storm & The Hurricanes.

According to Richie Unterberger at AllMusic:

"Much of the Berries' output reflected the lighter pop/rock face of the British beat boom, emphasizing catchy, carefully constructed tunes supplied by British and American songwriters, with high harmonies indebted to the Four Seasons and the Beach Boys.... A career strategy that put an eye on the "all-around entertainer" niche, however, led them to record many comedy numbers that have dated excruciatingly badly, and also ensured that they were denied artistic credibility."

The commercial fortunes of the group declined thereafter, although "You're My Girl" (1965) and "The Water Is Over My Head" (1966) were minor chart hits. They regularly featured Clive Lea's impersonations and group comedy routines, remained a popular live act on the cabaret circuit, and appeared at the 1967 Royal Variety Performance. Geoff Turton left the group in 1968, and had a briefly successful solo career as Jefferson, with two Billboard Hot 100 hits in the US in 1969–70. Clive Lea left in 1970, and was replaced by Terry Webster. The Rockin' Berries continued to perform as a music and comedy act in cabaret, with numerous later personnel changes. Turton returned to the group in the 1970s, and, with Botfield, has remained with the group up to 2020. Botfield died on 30 July 2020. Original bass guitarist Tim Munns died in January 2025, at the age of 81. Drummer Keith Smart died on 2 September 2025, at the age of 78.

== Band personnel ==
Current members

- Geoff Turton (born Geoffrey Colin Turton, 11 March 1944, Birmingham) – lead vocals, rhythm guitar (1961–1968, 1970–present)
- Simon Ryland – drums (1998–present)
- Jay McGee – lead vocals (2000–present)

Former members

- Rick Price (10 June 1944, Birmingham – 17 May 2022) – bass (1990–2022)
- Steve Lawrence (1995- 2007)
- Chuck Botfield (born Bryan Charles Botfield, 14 November 1943, Birmingham – 30 July 2020) – lead guitar (1961–2020)
- Terry Bond (born Terence Bond, 22 March 1943, Birmingham) – drums (1961–1970)
- Doug Thompson – guitar (1961)
- Paul Hewitt – lead vocals (1961)
- Tim Munns – bass (1961; died 2025)
- Dennis Ryland – saxophone (1961)
- Jimmy Powell – lead vocals (1961)
- Clive Lea (born Robert Clive Lea, 16 February 1942, Birmingham – 9 May 2021) – lead vocals (1961–1970)
- Roy Austin (born 27 December 1943, Birmingham – bass (1961–1965)
- Bobby Thomson – (born 1942, Liverpool) – bass/vocals (1965–1975)
- Ken Rodway (born [Mansfield, Nottinghamshire] – vocals/drums (1966–1967) — Now a born again Christian author, and minister of the Gospel.
- Rod Clarke (born Rodney Clarke, 23 November 1942, Surlingham, Norfolk) – guitar (1967–1970), died 2025
- Terry Webster – lead vocals (1970–1976)
- Keith Smart (10 December 1946, Birmingham – 2 September 2025) – drums (1970–1998)
- John Dawson – bass (1976–1990)
- Derek Jason – lead vocals (1976–2000)

== Discography ==
=== Singles ===
- "Wah Wah Wah Woo" / "Rockin' Berry Stomp" (Decca F 11698) – (1963)
- "Itty Bitty Pieces" / "The Twitch" (Decca 11760) – (1963)
- "I Didn't Mean To Hurt You" / "You'd Better Come Home" (Piccadilly 7N 35197) – (1964) – UK Singles Chart Number 43
- "He's in Town" / "Flashback" (Piccadilly 7N 35203) – (Oct. 1964) – Number 3
- "What In The World's Come Over You" / "You Don't Know What To Do" (Piccadilly 7N 35217) – (1964) – Number 23
- "Poor Man's Son" / "Follow Me" (Piccadilly 7N 35236) – (1965) – Number 5
- "You're My Girl" / "Brother Bill" (Piccadilly 7N 35254) – (1965) – Number 40
- "The Water Is Over My Head" / "Doesn't Time Fly" (Piccadilly 7N 35270) – (1965) – Number 43
- "I Could Make You Fall In Love" / "Land Of Love" (Piccadilly 7N 35304) – (1966)
- "Midnight Mary" / "Money Grows On Trees" (Piccadilly 7N 35327) – (1966)
- "Sometimes" / "Needs To Be" (Piccadilly 7N 35373) – (1967)
- "Smile" / "Breakfast At Sam's" (Piccadilly 7N 35400) – (1967)
- "Dawn (Go Away)" / "She's Not Like Any Girl" (Pye 7N 17411) – (1967)
- "When I Reach The Top" / "Pain" (Pye 7N 17519) – (1968)
- "Mr. Blue" / "Land Of Love" (Pye 7N 17589) – (1968)
- "Rock-A-Bye Nursery Rhyme" / "Long Time Ago" (Pye 7N 45394) – (1974)

=== Extended players ===
- "I Didn't Mean To Hurt You" (Piccadilly NEP 34039) – (1965)
- "New From The Berries" (Piccadilly NEP 34043) – (1965)
- "Happy To Blue" (Piccadilly NEP 34045) – (1965)

=== Albums ===
- They're In Town (Piccadilly NPL 38013) – (1964) – UK Albums Chart Number 15
- Life Is Just A Bowl Of Berries (Piccadilly NPL 38022) – (1965)

== See also ==
- List of performances on Top of the Pops
