= Let Me Go, Devil =

"Let Me Go, Devil" is a song written in 1953 by Jenny Lou Carson. Carson greatly admired the talents of Hank Williams. Williams' battle with alcoholism and subsequent death inspired her to write the song.

It was first recorded on July 2, 1953, by Wade Ray, followed a few weeks later by Georgie Shaw, Johnny Bond and Tex Ritter.

In 1954, then Columbia Records producer Mitch Miller felt the song as written was too depressing for pop audiences and suggested that "Devil" be changed to "Lover". The pop song writing team of Fred Wise, Kay Twomey, and Ben Weisman writing under the pseudonym Al Hill, were hired to rewrite the lyrics. The song became the major 1954-1955 hit, "Let Me Go, Lover!."

In 1954, it was also recorded By Hank Snow, on RCA Victor 47-5960. The 45 rpm label showed "Let Me Go, Lover"; however the lyrics heard on the piece were "Let Me Go, Woman", following closely the Mitch Miller revised lyrics.
