= He's in Town =

Single by The Tokens
- B-side: "Oh Cathy"
- Released: 1964
- Genre: Pop rock
- Length: 2:20
- Label: B. T. Puppy
- Songwriters: Gerry Goffin, Carole King
- Producer: Big Time Productions

"He's in Town"

Single by The Rockin' Berries
- B-side: "Flashback"
- Released: 1964
- Genre: Pop rock
- Label: Piccadilly
- Songwriters: Gerry Goffin, Carole King

"He's in Town" is a song and single by the American band The Tokens, covered successfully in the U.K. by The Rockin' Berries. Written by Gerry Goffin and Carole King, it was first released in 1964.

== Background and chart success ==
The Tokens version was released in 1964 and reached No. 43 in September in the Billboard Hot 100 chart in the U.S.

The Rockin' Berries version reached No. 3 in the UK Singles Chart, in October 1964, and was in the chart for 13 weeks. It was their second U.K. success and their highest-placed single in the chart. In New Zealand it reached #6 on the Lever Hit Parade.

== Television and film ==
- The Rockin' Berries' version of the song appears in the 2015 British film Legend, which is heavily based on the story of the Kray twins, notorious London gangsters during the mid-1960s (when the song was a U.K. hit).
