= Joan Weber =

American singer (1935–1981)

- Born: December 12, 1935; Paulsboro, New Jersey, U.S.
- Died: May 13, 1981 (aged 45) Winslow Township, New Jersey, U.S.
- Genres: Traditional pop
- Years active: 1950s

Joan S. Weber (December 12, 1935 – May 13, 1981) was an American popular music singer known for her 1955 hit "Let Me Go, Lover!"

== Early years ==
Weber was raised in Paulsboro, New Jersey, and married to George Verfaillie, a young bandleader. She was pregnant in 1954 when she was introduced to Eddie Joy, a manager, who in turn introduced her to Charles Randolph Grean, an A&R worker for RCA and Dot Records in New York City.

== Career ==
Grean gave a demo of Weber singing "Marionette" to Mitch Miller, the head of artists and repertoire at Columbia Records. Miller took "Let Me Go, Devil" and had it rewritten by Ben Weisman, Fred Wise and Kay Twomey as "Let Me Go, Lover!" for Weber, who recorded it on the Columbia label (with "Marionette" as the B-side). The song was performed on the television show Studio One and caught the public's fancy, reaching No. 1 in the United States and No. 16 in the United Kingdom in 1955. It sold over one million copies, and was awarded a gold disc. "Let Me Go, Lover!" ascended to No. 1 on the Billboard Most Played by Jockeys chart on January 1, 1955, the date that the rock and roll era began, according to music historians such as Joel Whitburn. A few weeks after the Studio One broadcast, Weber began performing at the Copacabana in New York City without being prepared for such a venue. "I was caught without an act," she said.

At the time of the song's biggest success, however, Weber gave birth to a daughter, Terry Lynn, and was unable to promote her career. Weber's next single, "Lover Lover (Why Must We Part)" (b/w "Tell the Lord", Columbia 40474), released later in 1954, failed to dent the record charts. Mitch Miller, in a 2004 interview for the Archive of American Television, recalled that Weber's husband assumed total control of the singer's activities, thus depriving Weber of experienced career guidance. After three more non-hits, "Call Me Careless", "Goodbye Lollipops, Hello Lipstick" and the appropriately-titled "Gone", Weber was dropped from Columbia's roster.

In 1957, Weber resumed singing in nightclubs. With sleek dresses, blonde hair, and a focus on ballads, she performed in Dallas, Houston, New Orleans, Ottawa, and Washington.

== Later years ==
Little is known about Weber's later life. She worked in a library at one point, but spent her final years in the Ancora Psychiatric Hospital in Winslow Township, New Jersey. By 1969, Columbia Records had lost track of her whereabouts: royalty checks mailed to her last known address were returned as undeliverable. For this reason, chart program American Top 40 ranked Weber at number one on a special program featuring the "Top 40 Disappearing Acts", which was broadcast in 1975.

Weber died from heart failure at Ancora Psychiatric Hospital on May 13, 1981, at the age of 45. She was buried in Eglington Cemetery, Clarksboro, New Jersey.
