= I Wouldn't Trade You for the World =

1964 single by the Bachelors

Single by the Bachelors
- B-side: "Beneath the Willow Tree"
- Released: 7 August 1964
- Genre: Pop
- Length: 2:41
- Label: Decca
- Songwriters: Bill Taylor; Major Bill Smith; Curtis Kirk
- Producer: Shel Talmy

The Bachelors singles chronology
"Ramona" (1964)	"I Wouldn't Trade You for the World" (1964)	"No Arms Can Ever Hold You" (1964)

"I Wouldn't Trade You for the World" is a song by Irish pop group The Bachelors, released as a single in August 1964. It reached number-one in Ireland, became a top-ten hit in the UK and peaked in the top-100 in the US.

== Background and release ==
"I Wouldn't Trade You for the World" was one of the Bachelors first singles not to have been a cover. It was written by Americans Bill Taylor, Major Bill Smith and Curtis Kirk, and was recorded by the group in 1963, though was shelved until the following year. It was released in August 1964 with the B-side "Beneath the Willow Tree", written by Tommy Scott and Bill Martin.

Reviewing for Disc, Don Nicholl described "I Wouldn't Trade You for the World" as "a simple steady mover with a warm tune and a good set of lyrics" and that "this time, I think, they have created something which itself will become a subject for revivals in the future". In Record Mirror, it was described as "certainly a great song with impeccable performances from all concerned. Tuneful and plaintive with loads of all-round appeal".

== Track listing ==
7": Decca / F 11949

1. "I Wouldn't Trade You for the World" – 2:41
2. "Beneath the Willow Tree"– 2:58

== Charts ==
Chart (1964–1965)	Peak position
Australia (Kent Music Report)	7
Ireland (IRMA)	1
New Zealand (Listener)	5
Rhodesia (Lyons Maid)	2
UK Disc Top 30	3
UK Melody Maker Pop 50	5
UK New Musical Express Top 30	4
UK Record Retailer Top 50	4
US Billboard Hot 100	60
US Easy Listening (Billboard)	13
US Cash Box Top 100	67
