= Call Up the Groups =

1964 single by the Barron Knights

Single by the Barron Knights with Duke D'Mond

from the album Call Up the Groups
- B-side: "Call Up the Groups" (Part 2)
- Released: 3 July 1964
- Genre: Parody; novelty
- Length: 2:35
- Label: Columbia
- Songwriters: Sonny Bono; Jack Nitzsche; Mitch Murray; Lennon–McCartney; Bert Russell; Phil Medley; Dave Clark; Mike Smith; Ernö Rapée; Lew Pollack; The Barron Knights

The Barron Knights with Duke D'Mond singles chronology
"Comin' Home Baby" (1964)	"Call Up the Groups" (1964)	"Come to the Dance" (1964)

"Call Up the Groups" is a song by British humorous group the Barron Knights released as a single in July 1964. It became a top-three hit in the UK and was awarded a silver disc by Disc for sales of over 250,000 copies.

== Background and release ==
Formed in 1960, the Barron Knights took inspiration from American group the Four Preps, known for their comedic and parody songs. Duke D'Mond described the Four Preps as "our idols" and that "we were big fans and we wanted to do something similar". "Call Up the Groups" was written by band member Peter Langford in February 1964 and is based on the Four Preps 1962 song "The Big Draft". "The Big Draft" is a medley of popular songs such as "I'll Never Smile Again", "Love Is a Many-Splendored Thing" and "Runaround Sue", with the lyrics rewritten to jokingly urge the government to conscript rival vocal groups such as the Platters so that the Four Preps would be the only group around. Langford reworked this idea for "Call Up the Groups" (with "call up" being another term for conscription) using a medley of songs recently popular in the UK and calling for the reinstatement of conscription in the UK.

Part one is a medley of "Needles and Pins" by the Searchers, "You Were Made for Me" by Freddie and the Dreamers and "I Wanna Be Your Man" by the Rolling Stones. Part two is a medley of "Diane" by the Bachelors, "Bits and Pieces" by the Dave Clark Five and "Twist and Shout" by the Beatles. Before the medley morphs into each song, the Barron Knights mentions the name of the artist. The group want to send the Searchers to Algiers, mock Freddie and the Dreamers (particularly Freddie Garrity because of his height) and want the Rolling Stones to join the Royal Navy.

After recording a demo of the song, it did not occur to the Barron Knights that in imitating these songs, permission from publishing companies was required. Some companies were not impressed with some of the parodying of their songs and turned the permission down. The original version of "Call Up the Groups" was edited so much that the group were sceptical whether the final version released as a single would have any success. However, the song became immensely popular and was their first song to chart, becoming a top-three hit in the UK.

== Track listing ==
7": Columbia / DB 7317

1. "Call Up the Groups" (Part 1) – 2:35
2. "Call Up the Groups" (Part 2) – 3:19

== Charts ==
Chart (1964)	Peak position
Australia (Kent Music Report)	28
Ireland (IRMA)	2
New Zealand (Lever Hit Parade)	4
Norway (VG-lista)	11
UK Disc Top 30	3
UK Melody Maker Pop 50	3
UK New Musical Express Top 30	4
UK Record Retailer Top 50	3
