= No Arms Can Ever Hold You (1955 song) =

"No Arms Can Ever Hold You" (also known as "No Other Arms") is a song popularized in 1955 by Pat Boone and Georgie Shaw, whose versions both charted in the United States at numbers 26 and 23, respectively.

== The Bachelors recording ==
In 1964, a recording by the Bachelors was a top 10 hit in Ireland, the UK, and Canada. It also charted on the U.S. Billboard Hot 100 at No. 27.

Chart (1964)	Peak position
Australia Kent Music Report	29
Canadian RPM Top Singles	10
Ireland (IRMA)	8
UK Singles (Official Charts)	7
U.S. Billboard Hot 100	27
