= Diane (Erno Rapee and Lew Pollack song) =

- Sheet music, 1927

Song
- Released: 1927
- Composer: Ernö Rapée
- Lyricist: Lew Pollack

"Diane" (also known as "Diane (I'm in Heaven When I See You Smile)") is a song by Ernö Rapée and Lew Pollack, and was originally written as a theme song for the 1927 silent movie 7th Heaven. Its musical composition entered the public domain on January 1, 2023. The song title is sometimes mistakenly referred to as "My Diane" or confused with the Beach Boys song "My Diane", which is a different song.

== Hit versions ==
- In 1928, the Nat Shilkret Orchestra had a major hit with the song and other successful versions that year were by Nathan Glantz and by Franklyn Baur.
- The song was a popular single by Irish band The Bachelors, which was released on January 3, 1964, on the Decca label (Decca F11799) and produced by Michael Barclay. It reached number-one in the UK Singles Chart, number two in Ireland and number three in Australia. The Bachelors became the first act from the Republic of Ireland to have a number-one single in the UK charts. In the US, "Diane" was the Bachelors most successful single, peaking at number 10 on the Billboard Hot 100 chart in 1964.

=== The Bachelors chart performance ===
Chart (1964)	Peak position
Ireland (IRMA)	2
New Zealand (Lever Hit parade)	2
UK Singles (The Official Charts Company)	1
US Billboard Middle-Road Singles	3
US Billboard Hot 100	10
