= Let Me Go, Lover! =

1954 single by Jenny Lou Carson and Al Hill

Single by Joan Weber
- B-side: "Marionette"
- Released: 1954
- Recorded: 1954
- Genre: Pop standard
- Length: 2:23
- Label: Columbia
- Composers: Jenny Lou Carson, Fred Wise, as pen name Al Hill
- Producer: Mitch Miller

"Let Me Go, Lover!", a popular song, was written by Jenny Lou Carson and Al Hill, a pen name used by Fred Wise, Kathleen Twomey, and Ben Weisman. It is based on an earlier song called "Let Me Go, Devil", about alcoholism.

== Background ==
"Let Me Go, Lover!" was first featured on the television program Studio One on November 15, 1954, and caught the fancy of the public. The episode was a murder mystery that revolved around a hit record and a disc jockey. Producer Felix Jackson asked Columbia Records' Mitch Miller for a recording to use in the show, and Miller provided Joan Weber's version of "Let Me Go, Lover!" Miller took advantage of the recording's exposure on national television and sent copies of the record to 2,000 disc jockeys, who began to play it on their radio stations.

Weber was pregnant when she recorded the song. A result of the program was to illustrate how efficiently a song could be promoted by introducing it to the public via radio or a TV production. The recording was released by Columbia Records as catalog number 40366. Mitch Miller stocked national record stores the week before the program and because of its availability the record sold over 100,000 in the first week of its release.

== Chart performance ==
Weber's record of the song first reached the Billboard magazine charts on December 4, 1954. By January 1955, it had hit No. 1 on all the Billboard charts (the Disk Jockey chart, the Best Seller chart, and the Juke Box chart). The song reached No. 16 in the UK Singles Chart, and was awarded a gold record.

== Other versions ==
It was also covered by a number of other singers:

- Among the cover versions was one by Patti Page. This recording was released by Mercury Records as catalog number 70511. It first reached the Billboard charts on December 18, 1954. On the Disk Jockey chart, it peaked at No. 8; on the Best Seller chart, at No. 24; on the Juke Box chart, at No. 12.
- Another cover, by Teresa Brewer and The Lancers, was recorded on November 18, 1954, and released by Coral Records as catalog number 61315. It reached No. 6 on the Billboard chart and No. 9 on the UK Singles Chart.
- Peggy Lee also released the song in 1954, reaching No. 26. On the Cash Box Best-Selling Records chart, all the versions were combined, and the song was also a No. 1 hit on that chart.
- Hank Snow's version ("Let Me Go, Woman") went to No. 1 on the country music charts in 1955.
- Dean Martin had the song released as a single in 1955, reaching No. 3 in the UK Singles Chart.
- In March 1955, Ruby Murray reached No. 5 in the UK Singles Chart with her version.
- Ann-Margret recorded a version on her 1962 album On the Way Up
- Kathy Kirby's version of the song went to No. 10 on the UK Singles Chart in 1964.
- It was also covered by Billy Fury, and turned out to one of the last songs he recorded before his death in 1983.
- Sunny Gale recorded a version in January 1955 that reached No. 17 on the Billboard chart.

== Bibliography ==
- Rogers, Arnold & Langley, Jerry (2005). Many Tears Ago: The Life and Times of Jenny Lou Carson. Nova/Nashville Books. ISBN 0-9628452-4-8
