= The Bachelors =

Irish pop group (1957–1984)

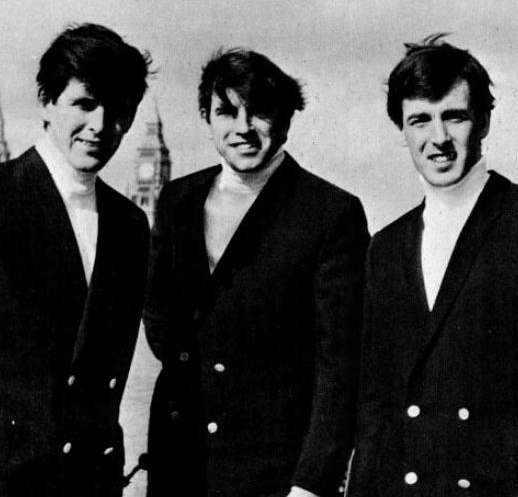
- The Bachelors in 1966 (l-r): John Stokes, Con Cluskey, Dec Cluskey

Background information
- Origin: Dublin, Ireland
- Genres: Pop; easy listening
- Years active: 1957–1984
- Labels: Universal, Decca, Philips, Pickwick, London, Galaxy, Deram
- Past members: Conleth Cluskey; Declan Cluskey; John Stokes
- Website: Con & Dec the Bachelors; John Stokes' the Bachelors

The Bachelors were a popular music group, originally from Dublin, Ireland, but based primarily in the United Kingdom. They had several international hits during the 1960s, including eight top-ten singles in the UK between 1963 and 1966, one of which ("Diane") went to no 1. The group split in 1984, with the former members of the group subsequently forming 2 separate groups.

== Career ==
The founding members of the group were Conleth (Con) Cluskey (18 November 1935 – 8 April 2022), his younger brother Declan (Dec) Cluskey (born 23 December 1941) and their friend John Stokes (Sean James Stokes) (born 13 August 1936). They formed their first band together in 1957: "The Harmonichords" (also seen as "The Harmony Chords"), a classically styled instrumental harmonica act.

As the Harmonichords, they appeared on Hughie Green's Opportunity Knocks on Radio Luxembourg and on The Ed Sullivan Show St. Patrick's Day special (filmed in Dublin, broadcast 15 March 1959), in which they played "Danny Boy". They also played background music plus featured pieces in a 25-week radio comedy series called Odd Noises on Radio Éireann, which featured Eamonn Andrews. In 1960, they changed their name to the Bachelors at the suggestion of Dick Rowe, A&R at Decca Records, who reportedly recommended the name "because that's the kind of boy a girl likes".

During the 1960s, they had many successful songs in music charts in Europe, Australia, South Africa, South America, USA and USSR. Among the most successful were: 1963 – "Charmaine", "Diane" (a UK no. 1 hit, the first by an Irish group); 1964 – "I Believe", "Ramona", "I Wouldn't Trade You for the World" (UK no. 2); 1965 – "Marie" (written by Irving Berlin), "In the Chapel in the Moonlight". In 1965 they also had the 'most played jukebox track' with "The Stars Will Remember", from the film "It's all over town". Their last big hit in the UK was a cover of the Paul Simon song "The Sound of Silence", which reached no. 3 in April 1966. They had eight top-ten singles in the UK between 1963 and 1966 and eight in Ireland from 1962 to 1966.

After a successful end to the 1960s with the album World of the Bachelors hitting the top 10 in 1968, the band became less successful in the changing music industry. They remained recording artists and moved to the Philips label, which contracted easy listening stars such as Val Doonican and The New Seekers. The group continued to play theatre shows and performed on the cabaret circuit, maintaining the original line-up until 1984 when there was "a messy split" between the Cluskey brothers and Stokes. The Cluskeys removed Stokes from their business company, "Bachelors Ltd", then dismissed him from the group. Stokes took legal action and it was ruled that the "Bachelors" name belonged to all three men. Following this acrimonious parting of the ways, with the rift never being healed, the Cluskey brothers appeared as "The New Bachelors" and Stokes as "Stokes & Coe"; Stokes also then appeared as "The New Bachelors and the Cluskeys performed as "Con & Dec, The Bachelors". The brothers continued performing cabaret as "The New Bachelors" with Peter Phipps until 1993, when they branched off as a duo called "The Cluskey Brothers".

In 2008, a compilation CD I Believe – The Very Best of The Bachelors was released. Featuring the 1960s hits together with two new songs recorded by Con and Dec Cluskey, it was issued by Universal which had acquired the Decca catalogue. Available in the US as an import from the UK, it reached no. 7 in the UK album chart. Con and Dec Cluskey appeared on TV and radio to promote the album.

The brothers continued to sing until 2020, when lockdown restrictions prevented them from touring.

Con Cluskey died on 8 April 2022, aged 86. He had been living in Elland, West Yorkshire, since 1970. Dec Cluskey still performs solo. John Stokes' Bachelors did a farewell tour in late 2022.

== Film and television ==
In the 1960s, the Bachelors made guest appearances on TV and performed in two Royal Variety TV shows. In 1963, they starred in It's All Over Town with Frankie Vaughan and The Springfields. The following year they appeared on the TV show Sunday Night at the London Palladium, then hosted by Bruce Forsyth: this episode achieved the largest viewing audience ever for this popular show.

The Bachelors appeared in a film in 1964 called Just for You (known as Disk-o-Tek Holiday in the USA), with DJ Sam Costa. In 1965 they made I've Gotta Horse with Billy Fury. In 1971 they featured in a TV situation comedy series called Under and Over, playing three Irish navvies working on the London Underground. Six episodes were broadcast on BBC One.

The group began 1970 by appearing on the BBC's highly rated review of the 1960s' music scene Pop Go The Sixties, performing "Charmaine" and "Diane" live on the show, which was broadcast on BBC1 on 1 January 1970.

In December 2016, Con and Dec appeared in Channel 4's Skeg Vegas, a one-off documentary following Skegness' entertainment agent Noel Gee.

In August 2017, Dec appeared as a contestant in Channel 4's Come Dine With Me.

== Songs ==
The Bachelors' version of "Charmaine", with its descending melody that had already made it an evergreen, jogs along to a country guitar strum and a sprinkling of piano licks. Dick Rowe chose American Shel Talmy as record producer, who went on to produce some of The Kinks' classic rock hits. Another 1927 movie theme song, "Diane"—penned by the same songwriters as "Charmaine", Erno Rapee and Lew Pollack, and arranged in the same Nashville-like manner, but produced by Michael Barclay—was released in 1964 and gave the group their biggest international hit, reaching number one in the UK Singles Chart, as well as an American breakthrough at number ten.

Four of their hit songs ("Charmaine", "Ramona", "Marie" and "Diane") were taken from 1920s' films. Jim Reeves had also covered the first three of these in the 1950s.

== Members ==
=== Con Cluskey ===
Cluskey (18 November 1935 – 8 April 2022) was born in Inchicore, Dublin, to a railway fitter father. He was educated at O'Connell School and Bolton Street College of Technology (now Dublin Institute of Technology), where he studied mechanical engineering. He worked as a heating engineer.

Cluskey married his wife Kay in 1961, but this was kept secret to maintain the trio's bachelor image. The couple moved into a 15th-century house in Elland in 1970, where he spent the remainder of his life. He was active in the local Catholic church and served as president of a Rotary club. In 2009, Cluskey tore an artery in his right leg.

Cluskey died on 8 April 2022 aged 86 from complications related to COVID-19 at Calderdale Royal Hospital. His wife Kay had died in October 2017. He was survived by four children and three grandchildren. His funeral reception was held in Huddersfield on 3 May 2022.

=== John Stokes ===
Stokes (born 13 August 1940) was born in Dublin and educated at O'Connell School, where he met fellow group members Con and Dec Cluskey.

Stokes was trained as a civil engineer and worked in the profession prior to the group’s commercial success. Within the group, he provided harmony vocals and played guitar. The Bachelors achieved major success in the early 1960s, including a UK number-one single with “Diane” in 1964.

Following the group’s peak commercial period, Stokes continued to perform with various line-ups of The Bachelors and remained active on the touring circuit into the 21st century.

=== Dec Cluskey ===
Cluskey (born 1941) is the younger brother of Con Cluskey. He was born in Dublin and educated at O'Connell School.

Dec Cluskey joined The Bachelors at its formation in the late 1950s, contributing harmony vocals and guitar. The group became one of the most commercially successful Irish pop acts of the early 1960s, recording multiple UK Top 10 singles and touring internationally.

He later reduced his involvement in full-time performing but remained associated with the group’s legacy and reunion activities. In later years, Cluskey largely withdrew from public life, making few media appearances.

== Other sources ==
- Sean Helferty and Raymond Refausse. Directory of Irish Archives. Dublin: Irish Academic Press, 1995.
