= Golbahar =

Golbahar (Persian: گلبهار) may refer to:

== Afghanistan ==
- Gulbahar, Afghanistan

== Iran ==
- Shahr Jadid-e Golbahar, a city near Mashhad city (40 km far from Mashhad)
- Golbahar, Khuzestan
- Golbahar-e Atabaki, a village in Lorestan Province, Iran
- Golbahar-e Olya, a village in Lorestan Province, Iran
- Golbahar-e Sheykh Miri, a village in Lorestan Province, Iran
- Golbahar-e Sofla, a village in Lorestan Province, Iran
- Golbahar-e Yusefabad, a village in Lorestan Province, Iran

== Pakistan ==
- Gulbahar, a neighborhood of Karachi, Sindh, Pakistan
