= Dehnow Aligar =

Village in Lorestan province, Iran

Dehnow Aligar Persian: ده نواليگر
- Village
- Location within Iran
- Coordinates: 33°12′56″N 49°34′32″E
- Country: Iran
- Province: Lorestan
- County: Aligudarz
- District: Borborud-e Gharbi
- Rural District: Cheshmeh Par

Population (2016)
  - Total: 143
- Time zone: UTC+3:30 (IRST)

Dehnow Aligar (Persian: ده نواليگر) (Note: Also romanized as Dehnow Alīgar; also known as Deh Now) is a village in Cheshmeh Par Rural District of Borborud-e Gharbi District in Aligudarz County, Lorestan province, Iran.

== Demographics ==
=== Population ===
At the time of the 2006 National Census, the village's population was 166 in 24 households, when it was in Borborud-e Gharbi Rural District of the Central District. The following census in 2011 counted 115 people in 22 households. The 2016 census measured the population of the village as 143 people in 42 households, by which time the rural district had been separated from the district in the formation of Borborud-e Gharbi District. Dehnow Aligar was transferred to Cheshmeh Par Rural District created in the new district.
