= Khanabad, Aligudarz =

Village in Lorestan province, Iran

Khanabad Persian: خان اباد
- Village
- Location within Iran
- Coordinates: 33°15′18″N 49°39′30″E
- Country: Iran
- Province: Lorestan
- County: Aligudarz
- District: Borborud-e Gharbi
- Rural District: Cheshmeh Par

Population (2016)
  - Total: 498
- Time zone: UTC+3:30 (IRST)

Khanabad (Persian: خان اباد) (Note: Also romanized as Khānābād) is a village in Cheshmeh Par Rural District of Borborud-e Gharbi District in Aligudarz County, Lorestan province, Iran.

== Demographics ==
=== Population ===
At the time of the 2006 National Census, the village's population was 529 in 99 households, when it was in Borborud-e Gharbi Rural District of the Central District. The following census in 2011 counted 554 people in 140 households. The 2016 census measured the population of the village as 498 people in 137 households, by which time the rural district had been separated from the district in the formation of Borborud-e Gharbi District. Khanabad was transferred to Cheshmeh Par Rural District created in the new district.
