= Kheyrabad, Aligudarz =

Village in Lorestan province, Iran

Kheyrabad Persian: خيراباد
- Village
- Location within Iran
- Coordinates: 33°13′33″N 49°38′00″E
- Country: Iran
- Province: Lorestan
- County: Aligudarz
- District: Borborud-e Gharbi
- Rural District: Cheshmeh Par

Population (2016)
  - Total: 233
- Time zone: UTC+3:30 (IRST)

Kheyrabad (Persian: خيراباد) (Note: Also romanized as Kheir Abad and Kheyrābād) is a village in Cheshmeh Par Rural District of Borborud-e Gharbi District in Aligudarz County, Lorestan province, Iran.

This village was built in 1308 by one of the elders and owners of the village named Kodkhoda Khairgerd Jalilund Basak, after the order of settlement of the nomads by the central government on the remains of an old village called Pirdezgah Olia. After that it was named Kheyrabad.

The people of the village are from the Lor Bakhtiari tribe, the Chaharlang branch of the Basak tribe, and they speak with the Lori Bakhtiari dialect. All the residents follow the religion of Islam and the Shia religion of the Twelve Imams. Their occupation is agriculture and animal husbandry. Their products are wheat, barley, and potatoes.

== Demographics ==
=== Population ===
At the time of the 2006 National Census, the village's population was 331 in 46 households, when it was in Borborud-e Gharbi Rural District of the Central District. The following census in 2011 counted 269 people in 50 households. The 2016 census measured the population of the village as 233 people in 54 households, by which time the rural district had been separated from the district in the formation of Borborud-e Gharbi District. Kheyrabad was transferred to Cheshmeh Par Rural District created in the new district.
