= Cheshmeh Par =

Village in Lorestan province, Iran

Cheshmeh Par Persian: چشمه پر
- Village
- Location within Iran
- Coordinates: 33°13′43″N 49°36′35″E
- Country: Iran
- Province: Lorestan
- County: Aligudarz
- District: Borborud-e Gharbi
- Rural District: Cheshmeh Par

Population (2016)
  - Total: 517
- Time zone: UTC+3:30 (IRST)

Cheshmeh Par (Persian: چشمه پر) is a village in, and the capital of, Cheshmeh Par Rural District in Borborud-e Gharbi District of Aligudarz County, Lorestan province, Iran.

== Demographics ==
=== Population ===
At the time of the 2006 National Census, the village's population was 581 in 101 households, when it was in Borborud-e Gharbi Rural District of the Central District. The following census in 2011 counted 547 people in 117 households. The 2016 census measured the population of the village as 517 people in 124 households, by which time the rural district had been separated from the district in the formation of Borborud-e Gharbi District. The village was transferred to Cheshmeh Par Rural District created in the new district. Cheshmeh Par was the most populous village in its rural district.
