= Pir Dezgah =

Village in Lorestan province, Iran

Pir Dezgah Persian: پيردزگاه
- Village
- Location within Iran
- Coordinates: 33°13′03″N 49°38′45″E
- Country: Iran
- Province: Lorestan
- County: Aligudarz
- District: Borborud-e Gharbi
- Rural District: Cheshmeh Par

Population (2016)
  - Total: 194
- Time zone: UTC+3:30 (IRST)

Pir Dezgah (Persian: پيردزگاه) (Note: Also romanized as Pīr Dezgāh; also known as Dezgāh) is a village in Cheshmeh Par Rural District of Borborud-e Gharbi District in Aligudarz County, Lorestan province, Iran.

== Demographics ==
=== Population ===
At the time of the 2006 National Census, the village's population was 252 in 44 households, when it was in Borborud-e Gharbi Rural District of the Central District. The following census in 2011 counted 167 people in 45 households. The 2016 census measured the population of the village as 194 people in 51 households, by which time the rural district had been separated from the district in the formation of Borborud-e Gharbi District. Pir Dezgah was transferred to Cheshmeh Par Rural District created in the new district.
