= Jahan Khvosh =

Village in Lorestan province, Iran

Jahan Khvosh Persian: جهانخوش
- Village
- Location within Iran
- Coordinates: 33°15′49″N 49°36′58″E
- Country: Iran
- Province: Lorestan
- County: Aligudarz
- District: Borborud-e Gharbi
- Rural District: Cheshmeh Par

Population (2016)
  - Total: 227
- Time zone: UTC+3:30 (IRST)

Jahan Khvosh (Persian: جهانخوش) (Note: Also romanized as Jahān Khowsh and Jahān Khvosh; also known as Jahan Khosh) is a village in Cheshmeh Par Rural District of Borborud-e Gharbi District in Aligudarz County, Lorestan province, Iran.

== Demographics ==
=== Population ===
At the time of the 2006 National Census, the village's population was 419 in 84 households, when it was in Borborud-e Gharbi Rural District of the Central District. The following census in 2011 counted 356 people in 79 households. The 2016 census measured the population of the village as 227 people in 63 households, by which time the rural district had been separated from the district in the formation of Borborud-e Gharbi District. Jahan Khvosh was transferred to Cheshmeh Par Rural District created in the new district.
