= Ab Barik, Aligudarz =

Village in Lorestan province, Iran

Ab Barik Persian: اب باريك
- Village
- Location within Iran
- Coordinates: 33°12′02″N 49°32′25″E
- Country: Iran
- Province: Lorestan
- County: Aligudarz
- District: Borborud-e Gharbi
- Rural District: Cheshmeh Par

Population (2016)
  - Total: 37
- Time zone: UTC+3:30 (IRST)

Ab Barik (Persian: اب باريك) (Note: Also romanized as Āb Bārīk and Āb-e Bārīk) is a village in Cheshmeh Par Rural District of Borborud-e Gharbi District in Aligudarz County, Lorestan province, Iran.

== Demographics ==
=== Population ===
At the time of the 2006 National Census, the village's population was 34 in five households, when it was in Borborud-e Gharbi Rural District of the Central District. The following census in 2011 counted 27 people in five households. The 2016 census measured the population of the village as 37 people in 12 households, by which time the rural district had been separated from the district in the formation of Borborud-e Gharbi District. Ab Barik was transferred to Cheshmeh Par Rural District created in the new district.
