= Borm =

Borm may refer to:

== Places ==
- Börm, Germany
- Borm-e Sabz, Kohgiluyeh and Boyer-Ahmad Province, Iran
- Borm-e Shir, Kohgiluyeh and Boyer-Ahmad Province, Iran
- Borm, Lorestan, Iran

== People ==
- William Borm (1895–1987), German politician

== See also ==
- Barm, Iran (disambiguation)
