= Borborud =

Borborud (Persian: بربرود) may refer to:

- Borborud-e Gharbi District
- Borborud-e Sharqi District
- Borborud-e Gharbi Rural District
- Borborud-e Sharqi Rural District
