= Dom Kamar =

Village in Lorestan province, Iran

Dom Kamar Persian: دم كمر
- Village
- Location within Iran
- Coordinates: 33°11′56″N 49°39′32″E
- Country: Iran
- Province: Lorestan
- County: Aligudarz
- District: Borborud-e Gharbi
- Rural District: Cheshmeh Par

Population (2016)
  - Total: 50
- Time zone: UTC+3:30 (IRST)

Dom Kamar (Persian: دم كمر) (Note: Also romanized as Dom-e Kamar) is a village in Cheshmeh Par Rural District of Borborud-e Gharbi District in Aligudarz County, Lorestan province, Iran.

== Demographics ==
=== Population ===
At the time of the 2006 National Census, the village's population was 178 in 30 households, when it was in Borborud-e Gharbi Rural District of the Central District. The following census in 2011 counted 96 people in 21 households. The 2016 census measured the population of the village as 50 people in 16 households, by which time the rural district had been separated from the district in the formation of Borborud-e Gharbi District. Dom Kamar was transferred to Cheshmeh Par Rural District created in the new district.
