= Kazemabad, Aligudarz =

Village in Lorestan province, Iran

Kazemabad Persian: كاظم اباد
- Village
- Location within Iran
- Coordinates: 33°07′57″N 49°40′34″E
- Country: Iran
- Province: Lorestan
- County: Aligudarz
- District: Borborud-e Gharbi
- Rural District: Cheshmeh Par

Population (2016)
  - Total: 254
- Time zone: UTC+3:30 (IRST)

Kazemabad (Persian: كاظم اباد) (Note: Also romanized as Kāz̧emābād) is a village in Cheshmeh Par Rural District of Borborud-e Gharbi District in Aligudarz County, Lorestan province, Iran.

== Demographics ==
=== Population ===
At the time of the 2006 National Census, the village's population was 289 in 47 households, when it was in Borborud-e Gharbi Rural District of the Central District. The following census in 2011 counted 248 people in 57 households. The 2016 census measured the population of the village as 254 people in 63 households, by which time the rural district had been separated from the district in the formation of Borborud-e Gharbi District. Kazemabad was transferred to Cheshmeh Par Rural District created in the new district.
