= Moghanak =

Moghanak (Persian: مقانك) may refer to:

- Moghanak-e Olya
- Moghanak-e Sofla
- Moqanak, Qazvin
- Moqanak, Tehran

== See also ==
- Moqanak (disambiguation)
