= Cheqa Gorg =

Village in Lorestan province, Iran

Cheqa Gorg Persian: چغاگرگ
- Village
- Location within Iran
- Coordinates: 33°10′34″N 49°34′54″E
- Country: Iran
- Province: Lorestan
- County: Aligudarz
- District: Borborud-e Gharbi
- Rural District: Cheshmeh Par

Population (2016)
  - Total: 275
- Time zone: UTC+3:30 (IRST)

Cheqa Gorg (Persian: چغاگرگ) (Note: Also romanized as Cheqā Gorg and Choqāgorg; also known as Chagha Gorg and Cheghā Gorg) is a village in Cheshmeh Par Rural District of Borborud-e Gharbi District in Aligudarz County, Lorestan province, Iran.

== Demographics ==
=== Population ===
At the time of the 2006 National Census, the village's population was 173 in 33 households, when it was in Borborud-e Gharbi Rural District of the Central District. The following census in 2011 counted 208 people in 51 households. The 2016 census measured the population of the village as 275 people in 78 households, by which time the rural district had been separated from the district in the formation of Borborud-e Gharbi District. Cheqa Gorg was transferred to Cheshmeh Par Rural District created in the new district.
