= Eslamabad, Aligudarz =

Village in Lorestan province, Iran

Eslamabad Persian: اسلام آباد
- Village
- Location within Iran
- Coordinates: 33°18′26″N 49°30′45″E
- Country: Iran
- Province: Lorestan
- County: Aligudarz
- District: Borborud-e Gharbi
- Rural District: Borborud-e Gharbi

Population (2016)
  - Total: 32
- Time zone: UTC+3:30 (IRST)

Eslamabad (Persian: اسلام آباد) (Note: Also romanized as Eslāmābād; also known as Hajjiabad-e Olya (حاجي آباد عليا), also romanized as Ḩājjīābād-e ʿOlyā) is a village in Borborud-e Gharbi Rural District of Borborud-e Gharbi District in Aligudarz County, Lorestan province, Iran.

== Demographics ==
=== Population ===
At the time of the 2006 National Census, the village's population was 61 in 14 households, when it was in the Central District. The following census in 2011 counted 56 people in 11 households. The 2016 census measured the population of the village as 32 people in seven households, by which time the rural district had been separated from the district in the formation of Borborud-e Gharbi District.
