= Mirandeh =

Mirandeh ميرونده
- Village
- Location within Iran
- Coordinates: 33°31′42″N 49°40′05″E
- Country: Iran
- Province: Lorestan
- County: Aligudarz
- Bakhsh: Central
- Rural District: Khomeh

Population (2006)
  - Total: 35
- Time zone: UTC+3:30 (IRST)
  - Summer (DST): UTC+4:30 (IRDT)

Mirandeh (Persian: ميرونده, also Romanized as Mīrāndeh and Mīrondeh) is a village in Khomeh Rural District, in the Central District of Aligudarz County, Lorestan Province, Iran. At the 2006 census, its population was 35, in 9 families.
