= Bornabad =

Bornabad (Persian: برناباد) may refer to:

- Bornabad, Lorestan
- Shahrak-e Bornabad, Lorestan Province
- Bornabad, Bardaskan, Razavi Khorasan Province
