= Kahriz-e Sorkh =

Village in Lorestan province, Iran

Kahriz-e Sorkh Persian: كهريزسرخ
- Village
- Location within Iran
- Coordinates: 33°19′58″N 49°43′29″E
- Country: Iran
- Province: Lorestan
- County: Aligudarz
- District: Borborud-e Gharbi
- Rural District: Borborud-e Gharbi

Population (2016)
  - Total: 85
- Time zone: UTC+3:30 (IRST)

Kahriz-e Sorkh (Persian: كهريزسرخ) (Note: Also romanized as Kahrīz Sorkh and Kahrīz-e Sorkh) is a village in Borborud-e Gharbi Rural District of Borborud-e Gharbi District in Aligudarz County, Lorestan province, Iran.

== Demographics ==
=== Population ===
At the time of the 2006 National Census, the village's population was 161 in 30 households, when it was in the Central District. The following census in 2011 counted 98 people in 22 households. The 2016 census measured the population of the village as 85 people in 22 households, by which time the rural district had been separated from the district in the formation of Borborud-e Gharbi District.
