= Anuj-e Bala =

Village in Lorestan province, Iran

Anuj-e Bala Persian: انوج بالا
- Village
- Location within Iran
- Coordinates: 33°12′50″N 49°40′53″E
- Country: Iran
- Province: Lorestan
- County: Aligudarz
- District: Borborud-e Gharbi
- Rural District: Borborud-e Gharbi

Population (2016)
  - Total: 53
- Time zone: UTC+3:30 (IRST)

Anuj-e Bala (Persian: انوج بالا) (Note: Also romanized as Anūj-e Bālā; formerly known as Anuj-e Olya (انوج عليا), also romanized as Anūj-e ‘Olyā) is a village in Borborud-e Gharbi Rural District of Borborud-e Gharbi District in Aligudarz County, Lorestan province, Iran.

== Demographics ==
=== Population ===
At the time of the 2006 National Census, the village's population, as Anuj-e Olya, was 48 in nine households, when it was in the Central District. The following census in 2011 counted 56 people in 14 households, by which time the village was listed as Anuj-e Bala. The 2016 census measured the population of the village as 53 people in 18 households, when the rural district had been separated from the district in the formation of Borborud-e Gharbi District.
