= Duzan =

Village in Lorestan province, Iran

Duzan Persian: دوزان
- Village
- Location within Iran
- Coordinates: 33°20′28″N 49°48′41″E
- Country: Iran
- Province: Lorestan
- County: Aligudarz
- District: Borborud-e Sharqi
- Rural District: Borborud-e Sharqi

Population (2016)
  - Total: 999
- Time zone: UTC+3:30 (IRST)

Duzan (Persian: دوزان) (Note: Also romanized as Doozan, Douzān, and Dūzān; also known as Dehzān, Dehzin, Dīzān, and Shahrak-e Valī-ye ‘Aşr) is a village in, and the capital of, Borborud-e Sharqi Rural District in Borborud-e Sharqi District of Aligudarz County, Lorestan province, Iran. The previous capital of the rural district was the village of Chaman Soltan, now a city.

== Demographics ==
=== Population ===
At the time of the 2006 National Census, the village's population was 845 in 177 households, when it was in the Central District. The following census in 2011 counted 876 people in 248 households. The 2016 census measured the population of the village as 999 people in 353 households, by which time the rural district had been separated from the district in the formation of Borborud-e Sharqi District.
