= Fiqan =

Village in Lorestan province, Iran

Fiqan Persian: فيقان
- Village
- Location within Iran
- Coordinates: 33°17′28″N 49°44′08″E
- Country: Iran
- Province: Lorestan
- County: Aligudarz
- District: Borborud-e Gharbi
- Rural District: Borborud-e Gharbi

Population (2016)
  - Total: 173
- Time zone: UTC+3:30 (IRST)

Fiqan (Persian: فيقان) (Note: Also romanized as Feyqān and Fīqān; also known as Fīghān) is a village in Borborud-e Gharbi Rural District of Borborud-e Gharbi District in Aligudarz County, Lorestan province, Iran.

== Demographics ==
=== Population ===
At the time of the 2006 National Census, the village's population was 258 in 41 households, when it was in the Central District. The following census in 2011 counted 212 people in 52 households. The 2016 census measured the population of the village as 173 people in 48 households, by which time the rural district had been separated from the district in the formation of Borborud-e Gharbi District.
