= Guran, Lorestan =

Village in Lorestan province, Iran

Guran Persian: گوران
- Village
- Location within Iran
- Coordinates: 33°17′51″N 49°45′30″E
- Country: Iran
- Province: Lorestan
- County: Aligudarz
- District: Borborud-e Gharbi
- Rural District: Borborud-e Gharbi

Population (2016)
  - Total: 134
- Time zone: UTC+3:30 (IRST)

Guran (Persian: گوران) (Note: Also romanized as Gooran and Gūrān) is a village in Borborud-e Gharbi Rural District of Borborud-e Gharbi District in Aligudarz County, Lorestan province, Iran.

== Demographics ==
=== Population ===
At the time of the 2006 National Census, the village's population was 164 in 28 households, when it was in the Central District. The following census in 2011 counted 151 people in 31 households. The 2016 census measured the population of the village as 134 people in 31 households, by which time the rural district had been separated from the district in the formation of Borborud-e Gharbi District.
