= Qasemabad, Aligudarz =

Village in Lorestan province, Iran

Qasemabad Persian: قاسم اباد
- Village
- Location within Iran
- Coordinates: 33°11′57″N 49°45′43″E
- Country: Iran
- Province: Lorestan
- County: Aligudarz
- District: Borborud-e Gharbi
- Rural District: Borborud-e Gharbi

Population (2016)
  - Total: 66
- Time zone: UTC+3:30 (IRST)

Qasemabad (Persian: قاسم اباد) (Note: Also romanized as Qāsemābād; also known as Ghasem Abad) is a village in Borborud-e Gharbi Rural District of Borborud-e Gharbi District in Aligudarz County, Lorestan province, Iran.

== Demographics ==
=== Population ===
At the time of the 2006 National Census, the village's population was 102 in 17 households, when it was in the Central District. The following census in 2011 counted 71 people in 19 households. The 2016 census measured the population of the village as 66 people in 10 households, by which time the rural district had been separated from the district in the formation of Borborud-e Gharbi District.
