= Khakabad =

Khakabad خاك اباد
- Village
- Location within Iran
- Coordinates: 33°24′32″N 49°49′12″E
- Country: Iran
- Province: Lorestan
- County: Aligudarz
- Bakhsh: Central
- Rural District: Khomeh

Population (2006)
  - Total: 139
- Time zone: UTC+3:30 (IRST)
  - Summer (DST): UTC+4:30 (IRDT)

Khakabad (Persian: خاك اباد, also Romanized as Khākābād; also known as Khāk Bād) is a village in Khomeh Rural District, in the Central District of Aligudarz County, Lorestan Province, Iran. At the 2006 census, its population was 139, in 28 families. Khakabad, uniquely on the crossroads of both the Christian and Shia-Muslim majority regions of Iran and also housing the only region of ethnically Georgian, Armenian and other such populations of Iran. The juxtaposition between these two ethno-religious groups shows that it is one of the most culturally diverse places in the nation even if it is incredibly small in both size, population and notoriety.
