= Saleh Saghir =

Village in Lorestan province, Iran

Saleh Saghir Persian: صالح صغير
- Village
- Location within Iran
- Coordinates: 33°14′25″N 49°46′13″E
- Country: Iran
- Province: Lorestan
- County: Aligudarz
- District: Borborud-e Gharbi
- Rural District: Borborud-e Gharbi

Population (2016)
  - Total: 75
- Time zone: UTC+3:30 (IRST)

Saleh Saghir (Persian: صالح صغير) (Note: Also romanized as Şāleḩ Şaghīr; also known as Sāl Şaghīr and Şāleḩ Şafīr) is a village in Borborud-e Gharbi Rural District of Borborud-e Gharbi District in Aligudarz County, Lorestan province, Iran.

== Demographics ==
=== Population ===
At the time of the 2006 National Census, the village's population was 32 in five households, when it was in the Central District. The following census in 2011 counted 42 people in seven households. The 2016 census measured the population of the village as 75 people in 15 households, by which time the rural district had been separated from the district in the formation of Borborud-e Gharbi District.
