= Jushan, Lorestan =

Village in Lorestan province, Iran

Jushan Persian: جوشان
- Village
- Location within Iran
- Coordinates: 33°20′37″N 49°44′43″E
- Country: Iran
- Province: Lorestan
- County: Aligudarz
- District: Borborud-e Gharbi
- Rural District: Borborud-e Gharbi

Population (2016)
  - Total: 243
- Time zone: UTC+3:30 (IRST)

Jushan (Persian: جوشان) (Note: Also romanized as Jooshan and Jūshān) is a village in Borborud-e Gharbi Rural District of Borborud-e Gharbi District in Aligudarz County, Lorestan province, Iran.

== Demographics ==
=== Population ===
At the time of the 2006 National Census, the village's population was 359 in 68 households, when it was in the Central District. The following census in 2011 counted 300 people in 79 households. The 2016 census measured the population of the village as 243 people in 68 households, by which time the rural district had been separated from the district in the formation of Borborud-e Gharbi District.
