= Bad Bad =

Village in Lorestan province, Iran

Bad Bad Persian: بادباد
- Village
- Location within Iran
- Coordinates: 33°20′04″N 49°46′16″E
- Country: Iran
- Province: Lorestan
- County: Aligudarz
- District: Borborud-e Sharqi
- Rural District: Borborud-e Sharqi

Population (2016)
  - Total: 269
- Time zone: UTC+3:30 (IRST)

Bad Bad (Persian: بادباد) (Note: Also romanized as Bād Bād and Bādbād) is a village in Borborud-e Sharqi Rural District of Borborud-e Sharqi District in Aligudarz County, Lorestan province, Iran.

== Demographics ==
=== Population ===
At the time of the 2006 National Census, the village's population was 350 in 72 households, when it was in the Central District. The following census in 2011 counted 327 people in 80 households. The 2016 census measured the population of the village as 269 people in 74 households, by which time the rural district had been separated from the district in the formation of Borborud-e Sharqi District.
