= Sang-e Sefid, Borborud-e Gharbi =

Village in Lorestan province, Iran

Sang-e Sefid Persian: سنگ سفيد
- Village
- Location within Iran
- Coordinates: 33°13′34″N 49°41′48″E
- Country: Iran
- Province: Lorestan
- County: Aligudarz
- District: Borborud-e Gharbi
- Rural District: Borborud-e Gharbi

Population (2016)
  - Total: 184
- Time zone: UTC+3:30 (IRST)

Sang-e Sefid (Persian: سنگ سفيد) (Note: Also romanized as Sang Sefīd and Sang-e Sefīd) is a village in Borborud-e Gharbi Rural District of Borborud-e Gharbi District in Aligudarz County, Lorestan province, Iran.

== Demographics ==
=== Population ===
At the time of the 2006 National Census, the village's population was 274 in 64 households, when it was in the Central District. The following census in 2011 counted 217 people in 46 households. The 2016 census measured the population of the village as 184 people in 59 households, by which time the rural district had been separated from the district in the formation of Borborud-e Gharbi District.
