= Sang-e Sefid, Borborud-e Sharqi =

Village in Lorestan province, Iran

Sang-e Sefid Persian: سنگ سفيد
- Village
- Location within Iran
- Coordinates: 33°20′28″N 49°49′25″E
- Country: Iran
- Province: Lorestan
- County: Aligudarz
- District: Borborud-e Sharqi
- Rural District: Borborud-e Sharqi

Population (2016)
  - Total: 259
- Time zone: UTC+3:30 (IRST)

Sang-e Sefid (Persian: سنگ سفيد) (Note: Also romanized as Sang Sefīd and Sang-e Sefīd) is a village in Borborud-e Sharqi Rural District of Borborud-e Sharqi District in Aligudarz County, Lorestan province, Iran.

== Demographics ==
=== Population ===
At the time of the 2006 National Census, the village's population was 327 in 61 households, when it was in the Central District. The following census in 2011 counted 289 people in 76 households. The 2016 census measured the population of the village as 259 people in 69 households, by which time the rural district had been separated from the district in the formation of Borborud-e Sharqi District.
