= Dahleh, Lorestan =

Village in Lorestan province, Iran

Dahleh Persian: دهله
- Village
- Location within Iran
- Coordinates: 33°14′16″N 49°41′14″E
- Country: Iran
- Province: Lorestan
- County: Aligudarz
- District: Borborud-e Gharbi
- Rural District: Borborud-e Gharbi

Population (2016)
  - Total: 35
- Time zone: UTC+3:30 (IRST)

Dahleh (Persian: دهله) (Note: Also romanized as Daleh; also known as Dahleh Ebrāhīm) is a village in Borborud-e Gharbi Rural District of Borborud-e Gharbi District in Aligudarz County, Lorestan province, Iran.

== Demographics ==
=== Population ===
At the time of the 2006 National Census, the village's population was 88 in 17 households, when it was in the Central District. The following census in 2011 counted 49 people in 11 households. The 2016 census measured the population of the village as 35 people in 10 households, by which time the rural district had been separated from the district in the formation of Borborud-e Gharbi District.
