= Deh Jani =

Village in Lorestan province, Iran

Deh Jani Persian: ده جاني
- Village
- Location within Iran
- Coordinates: 33°12′22″N 49°38′43″E
- Country: Iran
- Province: Lorestan
- County: Aligudarz
- District: Borborud-e Gharbi
- Rural District: Cheshmeh Par

Population (2016)
  - Total: 28
- Time zone: UTC+3:30 (IRST)

Deh Jani (Persian: ده جاني) (Note: Also romanized as Deh Jānī; also known as Dejānī) is a village in Cheshmeh Par Rural District of Borborud-e Gharbi District in Aligudarz County, Lorestan province, Iran.

== Demographics ==
=== Population ===
At the time of the 2006 National Census, the village's population was 79 in 12 households, when it was in Borborud-e Gharbi Rural District of the Central District. The following census in 2011 counted 45 people in 13 households. The 2016 census measured the population of the village as 28 people in 10 households, by which time the rural district had been separated from the district in the formation of Borborud-e Gharbi District. Deh Jani was transferred to Cheshmeh Par Rural District created in the new district.
