= Aliabad Darreh Moshk =

Village in Lorestan province, Iran

Aliabad Darreh Moshk Persian: علي آباد دره مشک
- Village
- Location within Iran
- Country: Iran
- Province: Lorestan
- County: Aligudarz
- District: Borborud-e Gharbi
- Rural District: Borborud-e Gharbi

Population (2016)
  - Total: 27
- Time zone: UTC+3:30 (IRST)

Aliabad Darreh Moshk (Persian: علي آباد دره مشک) (Note: Also romanized as ʿ‘Alīābād Darreh Moshk; also known as ‘Alīābād) is a village in Borborud-e Gharbi Rural District of Borborud-e Gharbi District in Aligudarz County, Lorestan province, Iran.

== Demographics ==
=== Population ===
At the time of the 2006 National Census, the village's population was 29 in nine households, when it was in the Central District. The following census in 2011 counted 23 people in six households. The 2016 census measured the population of the village as 27 people in eight households, by which time the rural district had been separated from the district in the formation of Borborud-e Gharbi District.
