= Zazam =

Village in Lorestan province, Iran

Zazam Persian: ززم
- Village
- Location within Iran
- Coordinates: 33°19′29″N 49°44′12″E
- Country: Iran
- Province: Lorestan
- County: Aligudarz
- District: Borborud-e Gharbi
- Rural District: Borborud-e Gharbi

Population (2016)
  - Total: 1,386
- Time zone: UTC+3:30 (IRST)

Zazam (Persian: ززم) (Note: Also romanized as Zazom) is a village in, and the capital of, Borborud-e Gharbi Rural District in Borborud-e Gharbi District of Aligudarz County, Lorestan province, Iran. The previous capital of the rural district was the village of Shahpurabad, now a city.

== Demographics ==
=== Population ===
At the time of the 2006 National Census, the village's population was 1,405 in 266 households, when it was in the Central District. The following census in 2011 counted 1,447 people in 326 households. The 2016 census measured the population of the village as 1,386 people in 349 households, by which time the rural district had been separated from the district in the formation of Borborud-e Gharbi District.
