= Khunsorkh =

Khunsorkh or Khoon Sorkh or Khun-e Sorkh or Khun Sorkh or Khun Surkh (Persian: خونسرخ) may refer to:

- Khunsorkh, Hormozgan
- Khun Sorkh, Kerman
- Khun Sorkh, Jiroft, Kerman Province
- Khunsorkh, Lorestan
