= Chaqataram =

Chaqataram چقاطرم
- Village
- Location within Iran
- Coordinates: 33°24′39″N 49°33′51″E
- Country: Iran
- Province: Lorestan
- County: Aligudarz
- Bakhsh: Central
- Rural District: Pachehlak-e Sharqi

Population (2006)
  - Total: 131
- Time zone: UTC+3:30 (IRST)
  - Summer (DST): UTC+4:30 (IRDT)

Chaqataram (Persian: چقاطرم, also Romanized as Chaqāţaram, Chagā Ţarm, Chaghāţūm, and Chogāţarm; also known as Chaghāţar) is a village in Pachehlak-e Sharqi Rural District, in the Central District of Aligudarz County, Lorestan Province, Iran. At the 2006 census, its population was 131, in 26 families.
