= Gallehvand =

Village in Lorestan province, Iran

Gallehvand Persian: گله وند
- Village
- Location within Iran
- Coordinates: 33°09′43″N 49°42′15″E
- Country: Iran
- Province: Lorestan
- County: Aligudarz
- District: Borborud-e Gharbi
- Rural District: Borborud-e Gharbi

Population (2016)
  - Total: 221
- Time zone: UTC+3:30 (IRST)

Gallehvand (Persian: گله وند) (Note: Also known as Galehband and Galleh Band) is a village in Borborud-e Gharbi Rural District of Borborud-e Gharbi District in Aligudarz County, Lorestan province, Iran.

== Demographics ==
=== Population ===
At the time of the 2006 National Census, the village's population was 300 in 47 households, when it was in the Central District. The following census in 2011 counted 223 people in 55 households. The 2016 census measured the population of the village as 221 people in 54 households, by which time the rural district had been separated from the district in the formation of Borborud-e Gharbi District.
