= Moshkak =

Village in Lorestan province, Iran

Moshkak Persian: مشكك
- Village
- Location within Iran
- Coordinates: 33°17′48″N 49°40′45″E
- Country: Iran
- Province: Lorestan
- County: Aligudarz
- District: Borborud-e Gharbi
- Rural District: Borborud-e Gharbi

Population (2016)
  - Total: 67
- Time zone: UTC+3:30 (IRST)

Moshkak (Persian: مشكك) (Note: Also known as Moshgak) is a village in Borborud-e Gharbi Rural District of Borborud-e Gharbi District in Aligudarz County, Lorestan province, Iran.

== Demographics ==
=== Population ===
At the time of the 2006 National Census, the village's population was 117 in 19 households, when it was in the Central District. The following census in 2011 counted 96 people in 20 households. The 2016 census measured the population of the village as 67 people in 21 households, by which time the rural district had been separated from the district in the formation of Borborud-e Gharbi District.
