= Golbahar-e Olya =

Village in Lorestan province, Iran

Golbahar-e Olya Persian: گل بهارعليا
- Village
- Location within Iran
- Coordinates: 33°10′40″N 49°40′37″E
- Country: Iran
- Province: Lorestan
- County: Aligudarz
- District: Borborud-e Gharbi
- Rural District: Cheshmeh Par

Population (2016)
  - Total: 43
- Time zone: UTC+3:30 (IRST)

Golbahar-e Olya (Persian: گل بهارعليا) (Note: Also romanized as Golbahār-e ‘Olyā) is a village in Cheshmeh Par Rural District of Borborud-e Gharbi District in Aligudarz County, Lorestan province, Iran.

== Demographics ==
=== Population ===
At the time of the 2006 National Census, the village's population was 74 in 12 households, when it was in Borborud-e Gharbi Rural District of the Central District. The following census in 2011 counted 44 people in 13 households. The 2016 census measured the population of the village as 43 people in 15 households, by which time the rural district had been separated from the district in the formation of Borborud-e Gharbi District. Golbahar-e Olya was transferred to Cheshmeh Par Rural District created in the new district.
