= Khomeh =

Khomeh (Persian: خمه) may refer to:

- Khomeh-ye Olya, a village in Lorestan, Iran
- Khomeh-ye Sofla, a village in Lorestan, Iran
- Khomeh Rural District, an administrative subdivision of Lorestan, Iran
