= Tiran, Lorestan =

Village in Lorestan province, Iran

Tiran Persian: تيران
- Village
- Location within Iran
- Coordinates: 33°11′04″N 49°47′01″E
- Country: Iran
- Province: Lorestan
- County: Aligudarz
- District: Borborud-e Gharbi
- Rural District: Borborud-e Gharbi

Population (2016)
  - Total: 241
- Time zone: UTC+3:30 (IRST)

Tiran (Persian: تيران) (Note: Also romanized as Tīrān; also known as Tīrūn) is a village in Borborud-e Gharbi Rural District of Borborud-e Gharbi District in Aligudarz County, Lorestan province, Iran.

== Demographics ==
=== Population ===
At the time of the 2006 National Census, the village's population was 361 in 64 households, when it was in the Central District. The following census in 2011 counted 215 people in 55 households. The 2016 census measured the population of the village as 241 people in 65 households, by which time the rural district had been separated from the district in the formation of Borborud-e Gharbi District.
