= Ab Barik-e Olya, Aligudarz =

Village in Lorestan province, Iran

Ab Barik-e Olya Persian: ابباريك عليا
- Village
- Location within Iran
- Coordinates: 33°14′08″N 49°50′26″E
- Country: Iran
- Province: Lorestan
- County: Aligudarz
- District: Borborud-e Sharqi
- Rural District: Borborud-e Sharqi

Population (2016)
  - Total: 453
- Time zone: UTC+3:30 (IRST)

Ab Barik-e Olya (Persian: ابباريك عليا) (Note: Also romanized as Āb Bārīk 'Olyā and Āb Bārīk-e 'Olyā; also known as Āb Bārīk Bālā and Āb Bārīk-e Bālā) is a village in Borborud-e Sharqi Rural District of Borborud-e Sharqi District in Aligudarz County, Lorestan province, Iran.

== Demographics ==
=== Population ===
At the time of the 2006 National Census, the village's population was 320 in 57 households, when it was in the Central District. The following census in 2011 counted 346 people in 62 households. The 2016 census measured the population of the village as 453 people in 89 households, by which time the rural district had been separated from the district in the formation of Borborud-e Sharqi District.
