= Golbahar-e Sheykh Miri =

Village in Lorestan province, Iran

Golbahar-e Sheykh Miri Persian: گل بهارشيخ ميري
- Village
- Location within Iran
- Coordinates: 33°11′39″N 49°40′21″E
- Country: Iran
- Province: Lorestan
- County: Aligudarz
- District: Borborud-e Gharbi
- Rural District: Cheshmeh Par

Population (2016)
  - Total: 48
- Time zone: UTC+3:30 (IRST)

Golbahar-e Sheykh Miri (Persian: گل بهارشيخ ميري) (Note: Also romanized as Golbahār-e Sheykh Mīrī; also known as Eslāmābād-e Sheykh Mīrī) is a village in Cheshmeh Par Rural District of Borborud-e Gharbi District in Aligudarz County, Lorestan province, Iran.

== Demographics ==
=== Population ===
At the time of the 2006 National Census, the village's population was 85 in 17 households, when it was in Borborud-e Gharbi Rural District of the Central District. The following census in 2011 counted 94 people in 26 households. The 2016 census measured the population of the village as 48 people in 17 households, by which time the rural district had been separated from the district in the formation of Borborud-e Gharbi District. Golbahar-e Sheykh Miri was transferred to Cheshmeh Par Rural District created in the new district.
