= Daricheh =

Village in Lorestan province, Iran

Daricheh Persian: داريچه
- Village
- Location within Iran
- Coordinates: 33°18′51″N 49°46′10″E
- Country: Iran
- Province: Lorestan
- County: Aligudarz
- District: Borborud-e Gharbi
- Rural District: Borborud-e Gharbi

Population (2016)
  - Total: 116
- Time zone: UTC+3:30 (IRST)

Daricheh (Persian: داريچه) (Note: Also romanized as Dārīcheh) is a village in Borborud-e Gharbi Rural District of Borborud-e Gharbi District in Aligudarz County, Lorestan province, Iran.

== Demographics ==
=== Population ===
At the time of the 2006 National Census, the village's population was 153 in 30 households, when it was in the Central District. The following census in 2011 counted 129 people in 25 households. The 2016 census measured the population of the village as 116 people in 30 households, by which time the rural district had been separated from the district in the formation of Borborud-e Gharbi District.
