= Roknabad, Lorestan =

Village in Lorestan province, Iran

Roknabad Persian: ركن اباد
- Village
- Location within Iran
- Coordinates: 33°19′20″N 49°56′16″E
- Country: Iran
- Province: Lorestan
- County: Aligudarz
- District: Borborud-e Sharqi
- Rural District: Borborud-e Sharqi

Population (2016)
  - Total: 67
- Time zone: UTC+3:30 (IRST)

Roknabad (Persian: ركن اباد) (Note: Also romanized as Roknābād; also known as Rukānābād) is a village in Borborud-e Sharqi Rural District of Borborud-e Sharqi District in Aligudarz County, Lorestan province, Iran.

== Demographics ==
=== Population ===
At the time of the 2006 National Census, the village's population was 159 in 41 households, when it was in the Central District. The following census in 2011 counted 133 people in 39 households. The 2016 census measured the population of the village as 67 people in 23 households, by which time the rural district had been separated from the district in the formation of Borborud-e Sharqi District.
