= Baqerabad, Lorestan =

Village in Lorestan province, Iran

Baqerabad Persian: باقرآباد
- Village
- Location within Iran
- Coordinates: 33°20′23″N 49°50′40″E
- Country: Iran
- Province: Lorestan
- County: Aligudarz
- District: Borborud-e Sharqi
- Rural District: Borborud-e Sharqi

Population (2016)
  - Total: 88
- Time zone: UTC+3:30 (IRST)

Baqerabad (Persian: باقرآباد) (Note: Also romanized as Bāqerābād) is a village in Borborud-e Sharqi Rural District of Borborud-e Sharqi District in Aligudarz County, Lorestan province, Iran.

== Demographics ==
=== Population ===
At the time of the 2006 National Census, the village's population was 127 in 24 households, when it was in the Central District. The following census in 2011 counted 94 people in 23 households. The 2016 census measured the population of the village as 88 people in 24 households, by which time the rural district had been separated from the district in the formation of Borborud-e Sharqi District.
