= Kicheh =

Village in Lorestan province, Iran

Kicheh Persian: كيچه
- Village
- Location within Iran
- Coordinates: 33°08′10″N 49°43′53″E
- Country: Iran
- Province: Lorestan
- County: Aligudarz
- District: Borborud-e Gharbi
- Rural District: Borborud-e Gharbi

Population (2016)
  - Total: 29
- Time zone: UTC+3:30 (IRST)

Kicheh (Persian: كيچه) (Note: Also romanized as Kīcheh; also known as Kehcheh) is a village in Borborud-e Gharbi Rural District of Borborud-e Gharbi District in Aligudarz County, Lorestan province, Iran.

== Demographics ==
=== Population ===
At the time of the 2006 National Census, the village's population was 66 in 10 households, when it was in the Central District. The following census in 2011 counted 52 people in 10 households. The 2016 census measured the population of the village as 29 people in eight households, by which time the rural district had been separated from the district in the formation of Borborud-e Gharbi District.
