= Ab Barik-e Sofla, Aligudarz =

Village in Lorestan province, Iran

Ab Barik-e Sofla Persian: ابباريك سفلي
- Village
- Location within Iran
- Coordinates: 33°14′09″N 49°49′16″E
- Country: Iran
- Province: Lorestan
- County: Aligudarz
- District: Borborud-e Sharqi
- Rural District: Borborud-e Sharqi

Population (2016)
  - Total: 286
- Time zone: UTC+3:30 (IRST)

Ab Barik-e Sofla (Persian: ابباريك سفلي) (Note: Also romanized as Āb Bārīk Soflá and Āb Bārīk-e Soflá; also known as Āb Bārīk Pā’īn and Āb Bārīk-e Pā’īn) is a village in Borborud-e Sharqi Rural District of Borborud-e Sharqi District in Aligudarz County, Lorestan province, Iran.

== Demographics ==
=== Population ===
At the time of the 2006 National Census, the village's population was 360 in 69 households, when it was in the Central District. The following census in 2011 counted 369 people in 75 households. The 2016 census measured the population of the village as 286 people in 70 households, by which time the rural district had been separated from the district in the formation of Borborud-e Sharqi District.
