= Khomestan, Lorestan =

Village in Lorestan province, Iran

Khomestan Persian: خمستان
- Village
- Location within Iran
- Coordinates: 33°15′36″N 49°35′52″E
- Country: Iran
- Province: Lorestan
- County: Aligudarz
- District: Borborud-e Gharbi
- Rural District: Cheshmeh Par

Population (2016)
  - Total: 157
- Time zone: UTC+3:30 (IRST)

Khomestan (Persian: خمستان) (Note: Also romanized as Khomestān) is a village in Cheshmeh Par Rural District of Borborud-e Gharbi District in Aligudarz County, Lorestan province, Iran.

== Demographics ==
=== Population ===
At the time of the 2006 National Census, the village's population was 196 in 33 households, when it was in Borborud-e Gharbi Rural District of the Central District. The following census in 2011 counted 160 people in 35 households. The 2016 census measured the population of the village as 157 people in 42 households, by which time the rural district had been separated from the district in the formation of Borborud-e Gharbi District. Khomestan was transferred to Cheshmeh Par Rural District created in the new district.
