= Deh Mirza Qoli =

Village in Lorestan province, Iran

Deh Mirza Qoli Persian: ده ميرزا قلي
- Village
- Country: Iran
- Province: Lorestan
- County: Aligudarz
- District: Borborud-e Gharbi
- Rural District: Borborud-e Gharbi

Population (2016)
  - Total: 23
- Time zone: UTC+3:30 (IRST)

Deh Mirza Qoli (Persian: ده ميرزا قلي) (Note: Also romanized as Deh Mīrzā Qolī) is a village in Borborud-e Gharbi Rural District of Borborud-e Gharbi District in Aligudarz County, Lorestan province, Iran.

== Demographics ==
=== Population ===
At the time of the 2006 National Census, the village's population was 33 in six households, when it was in the Central District. The following census in 2011 counted 32 people in eight households. The 2016 census measured the population of the village as 23 people in seven households, by which time the rural district had been separated from the district in the formation of Borborud-e Gharbi District.
