= Shahriar, Lorestan =

Village in Lorestan province, Iran

Shahriar Persian: شهريار
- Village
- Location within Iran
- Coordinates: 33°16′29″N 49°45′09″E
- Country: Iran
- Province: Lorestan
- County: Aligudarz
- District: Borborud-e Gharbi
- Rural District: Borborud-e Gharbi

Population (2016)
  - Total: 81
- Time zone: UTC+3:30 (IRST)

Shahriar (Persian: شهريار) (Note: Also romanized as Shahrīār, Shahriyar, and Shahryār) is a village in Borborud-e Gharbi Rural District of Borborud-e Gharbi District in Aligudarz County, Lorestan province, Iran.

== Demographics ==
=== Population ===
At the time of the 2006 National Census, the village's population was 136 in 31 households, when it was in the Central District. The following census in 2011 counted 80 people in 20 households. The 2016 census measured the population of the village as 81 people in 18 households, by which time the rural district had been separated from the district in the formation of Borborud-e Gharbi District.
