= Dahleh Sufian =

Village in Lorestan province, Iran

Dahleh Sufian Persian: دهله صوفيان
- Village
- Location within Iran
- Coordinates: 33°09′55″N 49°41′35″E
- Country: Iran
- Province: Lorestan
- County: Aligudarz
- District: Borborud-e Gharbi
- Rural District: Borborud-e Gharbi

Population (2016)
  - Total: 55
- Time zone: UTC+3:30 (IRST)

Dahleh Sufian (Persian: دهله صوفيان) (Note: Also romanized as Dahleh Şūfīān and Dahleh-ye Sūfeyān) is a village in Borborud-e Gharbi Rural District of Borborud-e Gharbi District in Aligudarz County, Lorestan province, Iran.

== Demographics ==
=== Population ===
At the time of the 2006 National Census, the village's population was 77 in 15 households, when it was in the Central District. The following census in 2011 counted 78 people in 18 households. The 2016 census measured the population of the village as 55 people in 15 households, by which time the rural district had been separated from the district in the formation of Borborud-e Gharbi District.
