= Bahramabad, Lorestan =

Village in Lorestan province, Iran

Bahramabad Persian: بهرام اباد
- Village
- Location within Iran
- Coordinates: 33°14′43″N 49°47′37″E
- Country: Iran
- Province: Lorestan
- County: Aligudarz
- District: Borborud-e Sharqi
- Rural District: Borborud-e Sharqi

Population (2016)
  - Total: 156
- Time zone: UTC+3:30 (IRST)

Bahramabad (Persian: بهرام اباد) (Note: Also romanized as Bahrāmābād) is a village in Borborud-e Sharqi Rural District of Borborud-e Sharqi District in Aligudarz County, Lorestan province, Iran.

== Demographics ==
=== Population ===
At the time of the 2006 National Census, the village's population was 125 in 17 households, when it was in the Central District. The following census in 2011 counted 125 people in 20 households. The 2016 census measured the population of the village as 156 people in 26 households, by which time the rural district had been separated from the district in the formation of Borborud-e Sharqi District.
