= Hajjiabad Beshaq =

Village in Lorestan province, Iran

Hajjiabad Beshaq Persian: حاجي ابادبسحاق
- Village
- Location within Iran
- Coordinates: 33°12′32″N 49°41′32″E
- Country: Iran
- Province: Lorestan
- County: Aligudarz
- District: Borborud-e Gharbi
- Rural District: Borborud-e Gharbi

Population (2016)
  - Total: 56
- Time zone: UTC+3:30 (IRST)

Hajjiabad Beshaq (Persian: حاجي ابادبسحاق) (Note: Also romanized as Ḩājjīābād Besḩāq; also known as Ḩājīābād and Ḩājjīābād) is a village in Borborud-e Gharbi Rural District of Borborud-e Gharbi District in Aligudarz County, Lorestan province, Iran.

== Demographics ==
=== Population ===
At the time of the 2006 National Census, the village's population was 60 in 13 households, when it was in the Central District. The following census in 2011 counted 54 people in 16 households. The 2016 census measured the population of the village as 56 people in 15 households, by which time the rural district had been separated from the district in the formation of Borborud-e Gharbi District.
