= Qaleh-ye Khalileh =

Village in Lorestan province, Iran

Qaleh-ye Khalileh Persian: قلعه خليله
- Village
- Location within Iran
- Coordinates: 33°14′59″N 49°53′05″E
- Country: Iran
- Province: Lorestan
- County: Aligudarz
- District: Borborud-e Sharqi
- Rural District: Borborud-e Sharqi

Population (2016)
  - Total: 132
- Time zone: UTC+3:30 (IRST)

Qaleh-ye Khalileh (Persian: قلعه خليله) (Note: Also romanized as Qal‘eh-ye Khalīleh; also known as Khalīl and Khalīleh) is a village in Borborud-e Sharqi Rural District of Borborud-e Sharqi District in Aligudarz County, Lorestan province, Iran.

== Demographics ==
=== Population ===
At the time of the 2006 National Census, the village's population was 124 in 28 households, when it was in the Central District. The following census in 2011 counted 109 people in 26 households. The 2016 census measured the population of the village as 132 people in 33 households, by which time the rural district had been separated from the district in the formation of Borborud-e Sharqi District.
