= Golbahar-e Yusefabad =

Village in Lorestan province, Iran

Golbahar-e Yusefabad Persian: گل بهاريوسف اباد
- Village
- Location within Iran
- Coordinates: 33°10′53″N 49°40′28″E
- Country: Iran
- Province: Lorestan
- County: Aligudarz
- District: Borborud-e Gharbi
- Rural District: Cheshmeh Par

Population (2016)
  - Total: 170
- Time zone: UTC+3:30 (IRST)

Golbahar-e Yusefabad (Persian: گل بهاريوسف اباد) (Note: Also romanized as Golbahār-e Yūsefābād) is a village in Cheshmeh Par Rural District of Borborud-e Gharbi District in Aligudarz County, Lorestan province, Iran.

== Demographics ==
=== Population ===
At the time of the 2006 National Census, the village's population was 187 in 43 households, when it was in Borborud-e Gharbi Rural District of the Central District. The following census in 2011 counted 181 people in 49 households. The 2016 census measured the population of the village as 170 people in 54 households, by which time the rural district had been separated from the district in the formation of Borborud-e Gharbi District. Golbahar-e Yusefabad was transferred to Cheshmeh Par Rural District created in the new district.
