= Anuj-e Pain =

Village in Lorestan province, Iran

Anuj-e Pain Persian: انوج پايين
- Village
- Location within Iran
- Country: Iran
- Province: Lorestan
- County: Aligudarz
- District: Borborud-e Gharbi
- Rural District: Borborud-e Gharbi

Population (2016)
  - Total: 53
- Time zone: UTC+3:30 (IRST)

Anuj-e Pain (Persian: انوج پايين) (Note: Also romanized as Anūj-e Pā’īn; formerly known as Anuj-e Sofla (انوج سفلي), also romanized as Anūj-e Soflá) is a village in Borborud-e Gharbi Rural District of Borborud-e Gharbi District in Aligudarz County, Lorestan province, Iran.

== Demographics ==
=== Population ===
At the time of the 2006 National Census, the village's population, as Anuj-e Sofla, was 54 in 10 households, when it was in the Central District. The following census in 2011 counted 51 people in 13 households, by which time the village was listed as Anuj-e Pain. The 2016 census measured the population of the village as 23 people in seven households, when the rural district had been separated from the district in the formation of Borborud-e Gharbi District.
