= Gandomineh =

Village in Lorestan province, Iran

Gandomineh Persian: گندمينه
- Village
- Location within Iran
- Coordinates: 33°21′14″N 49°53′43″E
- Country: Iran
- Province: Lorestan
- County: Aligudarz
- District: Borborud-e Sharqi
- Rural District: Borborud-e Sharqi

Population (2016)
  - Total: 922
- Time zone: UTC+3:30 (IRST)

Gandomineh (Persian: گندمينه) (Note: Also romanized as Gandomīneh and Gandmīneh) is a village in Borborud-e Sharqi Rural District of Borborud-e Sharqi District in Aligudarz County, Lorestan province, Iran.

== Demographics ==
=== Population ===
At the time of the 2006 National Census, the village's population was 1,407 in 367 households, when it was in the Central District. The following census in 2011 counted 1,060 people in 361 households. The 2016 census measured the population of the village as 922 people in 324 households, by which time the rural district had been separated from the district in the formation of Borborud-e Sharqi District.
