= Golbahar-e Atabaki =

Village in Lorestan province, Iran

Golbahar-e Atabaki Persian: گل بهاراتابكي
- Village
- Location within Iran
- Coordinates: 33°11′16″N 49°40′22″E
- Country: Iran
- Province: Lorestan
- County: Aligudarz
- District: Borborud-e Gharbi
- Rural District: Cheshmeh Par

Population (2016)
  - Total: 100
- Time zone: UTC+3:30 (IRST)

Golbahar-e Atabaki (Persian: گل بهاراتابكي) (Note: Also romanized as Gol Bahār Atābakī, Golbahār-e Atābakī; also known as Golbahār-e Atābak) is a village in Cheshmeh Par Rural District of Borborud-e Gharbi District in Aligudarz County, Lorestan province, Iran.

== Demographics ==
=== Population ===
At the time of the 2006 National Census, the village's population was 142 in 25 households, when it was in Borborud-e Gharbi Rural District of the Central District. The following census in 2011 counted 142 people in 29 households. The 2016 census measured the population of the village as 100 people in 29 households, by which time the rural district had been separated from the district in the formation of Borborud-e Gharbi District. Golbahar-e Atabaki was transferred to Cheshmeh Par Rural District created in the new district.
