= Deh-e Salman =

Deh-e Salman or Deh Salman (Persian: ده سلمان) may refer to:

- Deh-e Salman, Lorestan
- Deh-e Salman, Markazi
