= Abdolreza, Iran =

Abdolreza or Abd ol Reza (Persian: عبدالرضا) may refer to:

- Abdolreza, Andika, Khuzestan Province
- Abdolreza, Lorestan
