= Moqanak =

Moqanak or Miqanak or Mowkanak or Mukanak or Muqanak or Maghaunak (Persian: مقانك) may refer to:

- Moqanak, Qazvin
- Moqanak, Tehran

== See also ==
- Moghanak (disambiguation)
