= Qaleh-ye Abd ol Reza =

Village in Lorestan province, Iran

Qaleh-ye Abd ol Reza Persian: قلعه عبدالرضا
- Village
- Location within Iran
- Coordinates: 33°17′00″N 49°49′16″E
- Country: Iran
- Province: Lorestan
- County: Aligudarz
- District: Borborud-e Sharqi
- Rural District: Borborud-e Sharqi

Population (2016)
  - Total: 71
- Time zone: UTC+3:30 (IRST)

Qaleh-ye Abd ol Reza (Persian: قلعه عبدالرضا) (Note: Also romanized as Qal‘eh-ye ‘Abd ol Reẕā; also known as Ghal’eh Abdolreza, Qal‘eh ‘Abd or Rezā, Qal‘eh ‘Abdur Riza, Qal‘eh-ye ‘Abd or Reẕā, Qal‘eh-ye ‘Abd or Rezā, Qal’eh-ye Abd Rezā, and Qal‘eh-ye ‘Abdo Reẕā) is a village in Borborud-e Sharqi Rural District of Borborud-e Sharqi District in Aligudarz County, Lorestan province, Iran.

== Demographics ==
=== Population ===
At the time of the 2006 National Census, the village's population was 90 in 18 households, when it was in the Central District. The following census in 2011 counted 80 people in 20 households. The 2016 census measured the population of the village as 71 people in 17 households, by which time the rural district had been separated from the district in the formation of Borborud-e Sharqi District.
