= Kashkak, Lorestan =

Village in Lorestan province, Iran

Kashkak Persian: كشكك
- Village
- Location within Iran
- Coordinates: 33°23′07″N 49°36′26″E
- Country: Iran
- Province: Lorestan
- County: Aligudarz
- District: Central
- Rural District: Pachehlak-e Sharqi

Population (2016)
  - Total: 464
- Time zone: UTC+3:30 (IRST)

Kashkak (Persian: كشكك) (Note: Also known as Qeshlāq and Qishlāq) is a village in Pachehlak-e Sharqi Rural District of the Central District in Aligudarz County, Lorestan province, Iran.

== Demographics ==
=== Population ===
At the time of the 2006 National Census, the village's population was 523 in 103 households. The following census in 2011 counted 437 people in 112 households. The 2016 census measured the population of the village as 464 people in 130 households.
