= Barm, Iran =

Barm or Borm (Persian: برم) in Iran may refer to:

- Barm-e Jamal, Fars Province
- Barm-e Shur, Fars Province
- Barm-e Siah, Fars Province
- Barm-e Siah Rudtalkh, Kohgiluyeh and Boyer-Ahmad Province
- Borm, Lorestan
- Barm, Semnan
