= Asmahur-e Bala =

Village in Lorestan province, Iran

Asmahur-e Bala Persian: اسماهوربالا
- Village
- Location within Iran
- Coordinates: 33°21′56″N 49°47′54″E
- Country: Iran
- Province: Lorestan
- County: Aligudarz
- District: Borborud-e Sharqi
- Rural District: Borborud-e Sharqi

Population (2016)
  - Total: 292
- Time zone: UTC+3:30 (IRST)

Asmahur-e Bala (Persian: اسماهوربالا) (Note: Also romanized as Asmāhūr-e Bālā and Esmāhūr Bālā; formerly known as Asmahur-e Olya (اسماهورعليا), also romanized as Asmāhūr-e ‘Olyā, Esmahoor Olya, and Esmāhūr-e ‘Olyā) is a village in Borborud-e Sharqi Rural District of Borborud-e Sharqi District in Aligudarz County, Lorestan province, Iran.

== Demographics ==
=== Population ===
At the time of the 2006 National Census, the village's population, as Asmahur-e Olya, was 305 in 68 households, when it was in the Central District. The following census in 2011 counted 262 people in 73 households, by which time the village was listed as Asmahur-e Bala. The 2016 census measured the population of the village as 292 people in 86 households, when the rural district had been separated from the district in the formation of Borborud-e Sharqi District.
