= Kureh Chi =

Village in Lorestan province, Iran

Kureh Chi Persian: كوره چي
- Village
- Location within Iran
- Coordinates: 33°29′24″N 49°37′39″E
- Country: Iran
- Province: Lorestan
- County: Aligudarz
- District: Central
- Rural District: Khomeh

Population (2016)
  - Total: 223
- Time zone: UTC+3:30 (IRST)

Kureh Chi (Persian: كوره چي) (Note: Also romanized as Kūreh Chī; also known as Gurachhin, Gūrāchīn, Gūrchī, Gūrchīn, Gūreh Chī, and Gūrehchīn) is a village in Khomeh Rural District of the Central District in Aligudarz County, Lorestan province, Iran.

== Demographics ==
=== Population ===
At the time of the 2006 National Census, the village's population was 338 in 52 households. The following census in 2011 counted 260 people in 68 households. The 2016 census measured the population of the village as 223 people in 76 households.
