= Qaleh Bardi, Lorestan =

Qaleh Bardi قلعه بردي
- Village
- Location within Iran
- Coordinates: 33°21′13″N 49°37′39″E
- Country: Iran
- Province: Lorestan
- County: Aligudarz
- Bakhsh: Central
- Rural District: Pachehlak-e Sharqi

Population (2006)
  - Total: 210
- Time zone: UTC+3:30 (IRST)
  - Summer (DST): UTC+4:30 (IRDT)

Qaleh Bardi (Persian: قلعه بردي, also Romanized as Qal‘eh Bardī and Ghal‘eh Bardi; also known as Qalāvardīn and Qalāvardīr) is a village in Pachehlak-e Sharqi Rural District, in the Central District of Aligudarz County, Lorestan Province, Iran. At the 2006 census, its population was 210, in 39 families.
