= Kivarz-e Pain =

Village in Lorestan province, Iran

Kivarz-e Pain Persian: کيورز پايين
- Village
- Location within Iran
- Coordinates: 33°09′08″N 49°42′49″E
- Country: Iran
- Province: Lorestan
- County: Aligudarz
- District: Borborud-e Gharbi
- Rural District: Borborud-e Gharbi

Population (2016)
  - Total: 421
- Time zone: UTC+3:30 (IRST)

Kivarz-e Pain (Persian: کيورز پايين) (Note: Also romanized as Kīvarz-e Pā’īn; formerly known as Kivarz-e Sofla (كيورزسفلي), also romanized as Kīvarz-e Sofla) is a village in Borborud-e Gharbi Rural District of Borborud-e Gharbi District in Aligudarz County, Lorestan province, Iran.

== Demographics ==
=== Population ===
At the time of the 2006 National Census, the village's population, as Kivarz-e Sofla, was 762 in 124 households, when it was in the Central District. The following census in 2011 counted 484 people in 103 households, by which time the village was listed as Kivarz-e Pain. The 2016 census measured the population of the village as 421 people in 102 households, when the rural district had been separated from the district in the formation of Borborud-e Gharbi District.
