= Asgaran, Lorestan =

Village in Lorestan province, Iran

Asgaran Persian: عسگران
- Village
- Location within Iran
- Coordinates: 33°18′53″N 49°50′03″E
- Country: Iran
- Province: Lorestan
- County: Aligudarz
- District: Borborud-e Sharqi
- Rural District: Borborud-e Sharqi

Population (2016)
  - Total: 29
- Time zone: UTC+3:30 (IRST)

Asgaran (Persian: عسگران) (Note: Also romanized as ‘Asgarān; also known as ‘Asgārān and ‘Askarān) is a village in Borborud-e Sharqi Rural District of Borborud-e Sharqi District in Aligudarz County, Lorestan province, Iran.

== Demographics ==
=== Population ===
At the time of the 2006 National Census, the village's population was 31 in eight households, when it was in the Central District. The 2016 census measured the population of the village as 29 people in five households, by which time the rural district had been separated from the district in the formation of Borborud-e Sharqi District.
