= Deh-e Sefid Kan Sorkh =

Village in Lorestan province, Iran

Deh-e Sefid Kan Sorkh Persian: ده سفید کانسرخ
- Village
- Location within Iran
- Coordinates: 33°15′52″N 49°33′50″E
- Country: Iran
- Province: Lorestan
- County: Aligudarz
- District: Central
- Rural District: Pachehlak-e Sharqi

Population (2016)
  - Total: 409
- Time zone: UTC+3:30 (IRST)

Deh-e Sefid Kan Sorkh (Persian: ده سفید کانسرخ) (Note: Also romanized as Deh-e Sefīd Kān Sorkh; also known as Deh Safīd and Deh-e Sefīd) is a village in Pachehlak-e Sharqi Rural District of the Central District in Aligudarz County, Lorestan province, Iran.

== Demographics ==
=== Population ===
At the time of the 2006 National Census, the village's population was 391 in 76 households. The following census in 2011 counted 351 people in 71 households. The 2016 census measured the population of the village as 409 people in 109 households.
