= Keznar =

Village in Lorestan province, Iran

Keznar Persian: كزنار
- Village
- Location within Iran
- Coordinates: 33°23′08″N 49°44′38″E
- Country: Iran
- Province: Lorestan
- County: Aligudarz
- District: Central
- Rural District: Khomeh

Population (2016)
  - Total: 381
- Time zone: UTC+3:30 (IRST)

Keznar (Persian: كزنار) (Note: Also romanized as Kaznār and Keznār; also known as Kaznā and Keznā) is a village in Khomeh Rural District of the Central District in Aligudarz County, Lorestan province, Iran.

== Demographics ==
=== Population ===
At the time of the 2006 National Census, the village's population was 371 in 80 households. The following census in 2011 counted 413 people in 112 households. The 2016 census measured the population of the village as 381 people in 110 households.
