= Cheshmeh Par Rural District =

Rural district in Lorestan province, Iran

Cheshmeh Par Rural District Persian: دهستان چشمه پر
- Rural District
- Location within Iran
- Coordinates: 33°13′N 49°36′E
- Country: Iran
- Province: Lorestan
- County: Aligudarz
- District: Borborud-e Gharbi
- Capital: Cheshmeh Par

Population (2016)
  - Total: 3,306
- Time zone: UTC+3:30 (IRST)

Cheshmeh Par Rural District (Persian: دهستان چشمه پر) is in Borborud-e Gharbi District of Aligudarz County, Lorestan province, Iran. Its capital is the village of Cheshmeh Par.

== History ==
After the 2011 National Census, Borborud-e Gharbi Rural District was separated from the Central District in the establishment of Borborud-e Gharbi District, and Cheshmeh Par Rural District was created in the new district.

== Demographics ==
=== Population ===
The 2016 census measured the population of the rural district as 3,306 in 897 households. The most populous of its 22 villages was Cheshmeh Par, with 517 people.

=== Other villages in the rural district ===
- Ab Barik
- Cheqa Gorg
- Cherbas
- Deh Jani
- Dehnow Aligar
- Dom Kamar
- Golbahar-e Atabaki
- Golbahar-e Olya
- Golbahar-e Sheykh Miri
- Golbahar-e Sofla
- Golbahar-e Yusefabad
- Jahan Khvosh
- Kazemabad
- Khanabad
- Kheyrabad
- Khomestan
- Pir Dezgah
