= Mushleh =

Village in Lorestan province, Iran

Mushleh Persian: موشله
- Village
- Location within Iran
- Coordinates: 33°28′49″N 49°40′48″E
- Country: Iran
- Province: Lorestan
- County: Aligudarz
- District: Central
- Rural District: Khomeh

Population (2016)
  - Total: 237
- Time zone: UTC+3:30 (IRST)

Mushleh (Persian: موشله) (Note: Also romanized as Mooshleh, Mūsheleh, and ''Mūshleh; also known as Mīshella and Mīshleh) is a village in Khomeh Rural District of the Central District in Aligudarz County, Lorestan province, Iran.

== Demographics ==
=== Population ===
At the time of the 2006 National Census, the village's population was 258 in 59 households. The following census in 2011 counted 251 people in 67 households. The 2016 census measured the population of the village as 237 people in 72 households.
