= Azna Mehalmak =

Village in Lorestan province, Iran

Azna Mehalmak Persian: ازنامهلمك
- Village
- Location within Iran
- Coordinates: 33°11′49″N 49°49′35″E
- Country: Iran
- Province: Lorestan
- County: Aligudarz
- District: Borborud-e Sharqi
- Rural District: Borborud-e Sharqi

Population (2016)
  - Total: 605
- Time zone: UTC+3:30 (IRST)

Azna Mehalmak (Persian: ازنامهلمك) (Note: Also romanized as Āznā Mehalmaḵ; also known as Azdā, Aznā, Eznā, Eznā Khvājeh, and Eznā Shahāb) is a village in Borborud-e Sharqi Rural District of Borborud-e Sharqi District in Aligudarz County, Lorestan province, Iran.

== Demographics ==
=== Population ===
At the time of the 2006 National Census, the village's population was 517 in 97 households, when it was in the Central District. The following census in 2011 counted 606 people in 109 households. The 2016 census measured the population of the village as 605 people in 118 households, by which time the rural district had been separated from the district in the formation of Borborud-e Sharqi District.
