= Kivarz-e Bala =

Village in Lorestan province, Iran

Kivarz-e Bala Persian: کيورز بالا
- Village
- Location within Iran
- Coordinates: 33°08′37″N 49°43′04″E
- Country: Iran
- Province: Lorestan
- County: Aligudarz
- District: Borborud-e Gharbi
- Rural District: Borborud-e Gharbi

Population (2016)
  - Total: 60
- Time zone: UTC+3:30 (IRST)

Kivarz-e Bala (Persian: کيورز بالا) (Note: Also romanized as Kīvarz-e Bālā; formerly known as Kivarz-e Olya (كيورزعليا), also romanized as Kīvarz ‘Olyā and Kīvarz-e ‘Olyā) is a village in Borborud-e Gharbi Rural District of Borborud-e Gharbi District in Aligudarz County, Lorestan province, Iran.

== Demographics ==
=== Population ===
At the time of the 2006 National Census, the village's population, as Kivarz-e Olya, was 134 in 23 households, when it was in the Central District. The following census in 2011 counted 38 people in seven households, by which time the village was listed as Kivarz-e Bala. The 2016 census measured the population of the village as 60 people in 17 households, when the rural district had been separated from the district in the formation of Borborud-e Gharbi District.
