= Khvorheh, Lorestan =

Village in Lorestan province, Iran

Khvorheh Persian: خورهه
- Village
- Location within Iran
- Coordinates: 33°25′44″N 49°41′29″E
- Country: Iran
- Province: Lorestan
- County: Aligudarz
- District: Central
- Rural District: Khomeh

Population (2016)
  - Total: 215
- Time zone: UTC+3:30 (IRST)

Khvorheh (Persian: خورهه) (Note: Also romanized as Khowrheh and Khūrheh; also known as Khorbeh, Khurreh, and Khvoreh) is a village in Khomeh Rural District of the Central District in Aligudarz County, Lorestan province, Iran.

== Demographics ==
=== Population ===
At the time of the 2006 National Census, the village's population was 249 in 54 households. The following census in 2011 counted 250 people in 65 households. The 2016 census measured the population of the village as 215 people in 65 households.
