= Sanj, Lorestan =

Village in Lorestan province, Iran

Sanj Persian: سنج
- Village
- Location within Iran
- Coordinates: 33°23′17″N 49°38′10″E
- Country: Iran
- Province: Lorestan
- County: Aligudarz
- District: Central
- Rural District: Pachehlak-e Sharqi

Population (2016)
  - Total: 629
- Time zone: UTC+3:30 (IRST)

Sanj (Persian: سنج) (Note: Also romanized as Senj; also known as Sīnj) is a village in Pachehlak-e Sharqi Rural District of the Central District in Aligudarz County, Lorestan province, Iran.

== Demographics ==
=== Population ===
At the time of the 2006 National Census, the village's population was 381 in 74 households. The following census in 2011 counted 524 people in 140 households. The 2016 census measured the population of the village as 629 people in 159 households.
