= Ivand =

Ivand may refer to:

- a village in Giulvăz municipality, Romania
- Ivand, Iran, a village in East Azerbaijan Province, Iran
- Ivand, Lorestan, a village in Lorestan Province, Iran
- Eyvand (disambiguation)
