= Asmahur-e Pain =

Village in Lorestan province, Iran

Asmahur-e Pain Persian: اسماهورپايين
- Village
- Location within Iran
- Coordinates: 33°21′08″N 49°46′34″E
- Country: Iran
- Province: Lorestan
- County: Aligudarz
- District: Borborud-e Sharqi
- Rural District: Borborud-e Sharqi

Population (2016)
  - Total: 54
- Time zone: UTC+3:30 (IRST)

Asmahur-e Pain (Persian: اسماهورپايين) (Note: Also romanized as Asmāhūr-e Pā’īn and Esmāhūr-e Pā’īn; formerly known as Asmahur-e Sofla (اسماهورسفلي), also romanized as Asmāhūr-e Soflá) is a village in Borborud-e Sharqi Rural District of Borborud-e Sharqi District in Aligudarz County, Lorestan province, Iran.

== Demographics ==
=== Population ===
At the time of the 2006 National Census, the village's population, as Asmahur-e Sofla, was 836 in 177 households, when it was in the Central District. The following census in 2011 counted 768 people in 208 households, by which time the village was listed as Asmahur-e Pain. The 2016 census measured the population of the village as 898 people in 264 households, when the rural district had been separated from the district in the formation of Borborud-e Sharqi District.
