= Kivarz =

Kivarz may refer to:

- Kivarz-e Olya, a village in Iran
- Kivarz-e Sofla, a village in Iran
