= Jowz =

Village in Lorestan province, Iran

Jowz Persian: جوز
- Village
- Location within Iran
- Coordinates: 33°21′58″N 49°50′00″E
- Country: Iran
- Province: Lorestan
- County: Aligudarz
- District: Borborud-e Sharqi
- Rural District: Borborud-e Sharqi

Population (2016)
  - Total: 284
- Time zone: UTC+3:30 (IRST)

Jowz (Persian: جوز) (Note: Also romanized as Juz) is a village in Borborud-e Sharqi Rural District of Borborud-e Sharqi District in Aligudarz County, Lorestan province, Iran.

== Demographics ==
=== Population ===
At the time of the 2006 National Census, the village's population was 355 in 76 households, when it was in the Central District. The following census in 2011 counted 279 people in 81 households. The 2016 census measured the population of the village as 284 people in 91 households, by which time the rural district had been separated from the district in the formation of Borborud-e Sharqi District.
