= Hajjiabad Darvish =

Hajjiabad Darvish حاجي اباددرويش
- Village
- Location within Iran
- Coordinates: 33°23′57″N 49°47′39″E
- Country: Iran
- Province: Lorestan
- County: Aligudarz
- Bakhsh: Central
- Rural District: Khomeh

Population (2006)
  - Total: 40
- Time zone: UTC+3:30 (IRST)
  - Summer (DST): UTC+4:30 (IRDT)

Hajjiabad Darvish (Persian: حاجي اباددرويش, also Romanized as Ḩājjīābād Darvīsh; also known as Ḩājjīābād, Ḩājīābād, and Haji Abad Japlogh) is a village in Khomeh Rural District, in the Central District of Aligudarz County, Lorestan Province, Iran. At the 2006 census, its population was 40, in 10 families.
