= Kondor, Lorestan =

Village in Lorestan province, Iran

Kondor Persian: كندر
- Village
- Location within Iran
- Coordinates: 33°31′38″N 49°41′43″E
- Country: Iran
- Province: Lorestan
- County: Aligudarz
- District: Central
- Rural District: Khomeh

Population (2016)
  - Total: 247
- Time zone: UTC+3:30 (IRST)

Kondor (Persian: كندر) (Note: Also known as Kundar) is a village in Khomeh Rural District of the Central District in Aligudarz County, Lorestan province, Iran.

== Demographics ==
=== Population ===
At the time of the 2006 National Census, the village's population was 438 in 83 households. The following census in 2011 counted 352 people in 100 households. The 2016 census measured the population of the village as 247 people in 80 households.
