= Asmahur =

Asmahur may refer to:

- Asmahur-e Olya
- Asmahur-e Sofla
