= Qaleh Bardi =

Qaleh Bardi (Persian: قلعه بردي) may refer to:

- Qaleh Bardi, Khuzestan, Iran
- Qaleh Bardi, Lorestan, Iran
