= Khomestan =

Khomestan or Khamestan (Persian: خمستان) may refer to:

- Khomestan, Lorestan, Iran
- Khamestan, Markazi, Iran
