= Deh-e Salman, Lorestan =

Village in Lorestan province, Iran

Deh-e Salman Persian: ده سلمان
- Village
- Location within Iran
- Coordinates: 33°11′08″N 49°42′08″E
- Country: Iran
- Province: Lorestan
- County: Aligudarz
- District: Borborud-e Gharbi
- Rural District: Borborud-e Gharbi

Population (2016)
  - Total: 59
- Time zone: UTC+3:30 (IRST)

Deh-e Salman (Persian: ده سلمان) (Note: Also romanized as Deh-e Salmān; also known as Salmān) is a village in Borborud-e Gharbi Rural District of Borborud-e Gharbi District in Aligudarz County, Lorestan province, Iran.

== Demographics ==
=== Population ===
At the time of the 2006 National Census, the village's population was 66 in 11 households, when it was in the Central District. The following census in 2011 counted 62 people in 12 households. The 2016 census measured the population of the village as 59 people in 17 households, by which time the rural district had been separated from the district in the formation of Borborud-e Gharbi District.
