= Sur, Iran =

Village in Lorestan province, Iran

Sur Persian: سور
- Village
- Location within Iran
- Coordinates: 33°23′57″N 49°35′59″E
- Country: Iran
- Province: Lorestan
- County: Aligudarz
- District: Central
- Rural District: Pachehlak-e Sharqi

Population (2016)
  - Total: 814
- Time zone: UTC+3:30 (IRST)

Sur (Persian: سور) (Note: Also romanized as Savar, Soor, and Sūr) is a village in, and the capital of, Pachehlak-e Sharqi Rural District in the Central District of Aligudarz County, Lorestan province, Iran.

== Demographics ==
=== Population ===
At the time of the 2006 National Census, the village's population was 717 in 145 households. The following census in 2011 counted 839 people in 224 households. The 2016 census measured the population of the village as 814 people in 204 households.
