= Deh-e Nasir =

Village in Lorestan province, Iran

Deh-e Nasir Persian: ده نصير
- Village
- Location within Iran
- Coordinates: 33°24′34″N 49°37′43″E
- Country: Iran
- Province: Lorestan
- County: Aligudarz
- District: Central
- Rural District: Pachehlak-e Sharqi

Population (2016)
  - Total: 835
- Time zone: UTC+3:30 (IRST)

Deh-e Nasir (Persian: ده نصير) (Note: Also romanized as Deh Nāsir and Deh-e Nāşīr; also known as Deh-e Naşer) is a village in Pachehlak-e Sharqi Rural District of the Central District in Aligudarz County, Lorestan province, Iran.

== Demographics ==
=== Population ===
At the time of the 2006 National Census, the village's population was 701 in 150 households. The following census in 2011 counted 795 people in 197 households. The 2016 census measured the population of the village as 835 people in 222 households, the most populous in its rural district.
