= Moghanak-e Bala =

Village in Lorestan province, Iran

Moghanak-e Bala Persian: مغانک بالا
- Village
- Location within Iran
- Coordinates: 33°16′06″N 49°48′43″E
- Country: Iran
- Province: Lorestan
- County: Aligudarz
- District: Borborud-e Sharqi
- Rural District: Borborud-e Sharqi

Population (2016)
  - Total: 59
- Time zone: UTC+3:30 (IRST)

Moghanak-e Bala (Persian: مغانک بالا) (Note: Also romanized as Moghānak-e Bālā; formerly known as Moghanak-e Olya (مغانك عليا), also romanized as Moghānak ‘Olyā and Moghānak-e ‘Olyā; also known as Moghānak) is a village in Borborud-e Sharqi Rural District of Borborud-e Sharqi District in Aligudarz County, Lorestan province, Iran.

== Demographics ==
=== Population ===
At the time of the 2006 National Census, the village's population, as Moghanak-e Olya, was 114 in 24 households, when it was in the Central District. The following census in 2011 counted 93 people in 25 households, by which time the village was listed as Moghanak-e Bala. The 2016 census measured the population of the village as 59 people in 19 households, when the rural district had been separated from the district in the formation of Borborud-e Sharqi District.
