= Gol-e Zard, Aligudarz =

Village in Lorestan province, Iran

Gol-e Zard Persian: گل زرد
- Village
- Location within Iran
- Coordinates: 33°26′39″N 49°44′03″E
- Country: Iran
- Province: Lorestan
- County: Aligudarz
- District: Central
- Rural District: Khomeh

Population (2016)
  - Total: 251
- Time zone: UTC+3:30 (IRST)

Gol-e Zard (Persian: گل زرد) (Note: Also romanized as Gol Zard; also known as Golī Zard) is a village in Khomeh Rural District of the Central District in Aligudarz County, Lorestan province, Iran.

== Demographics ==
=== Population ===
At the time of the 2006 National Census, the village's population was 281 in 53 households. The following census in 2011 counted 275 people in 57 households. The 2016 census measured the population of the village as 251 people in 58 households.
