= Asgaran =

Asgaran may refer to:

- Askeran (town), Nagorno-Karabakh, Azerbaijan
- Asgaran, Iran, a city in Isfahan Province, Iran
- Asgaran, Kurdistan, a village in Kurdistan Province, Iran
- Asgaran, Lorestan, a village in Lorestan Province, Iran
