= Moghanak-e Pain =

Village in Lorestan province, Iran

Moghanak-e Pain Persian: مغانک پايين
- Village
- Location within Iran
- Coordinates: 33°16′54″N 49°47′11″E
- Country: Iran
- Province: Lorestan
- County: Aligudarz
- District: Borborud-e Sharqi
- Rural District: Borborud-e Sharqi

Population (2016)
  - Total: 450
- Time zone: UTC+3:30 (IRST)

Moghanak-e Pain (Persian: مغانک پايين) (Note: Also romanized as Moghānak-e Pā‘īn; formerly known as Moghanak-e Sofla (مغانك سفلي), also romanized as Moghānak Soflá and Moghānak-e Soflá) is a village in Borborud-e Sharqi Rural District of Borborud-e Sharqi District in Aligudarz County, Lorestan province, Iran.

== Demographics ==
=== Population ===
At the time of the 2006 National Census, the village's population, as Moghanak-e Sofla, was 554 in 111 households, when it was in the Central District. The following census in 2011 counted 483 people in 133 households, by which time the village was listed as Moghanak-e Pain. The 2016 census measured the population of the village as 450 people in 116 households, when the rural district had been separated from the district in the formation of Borborud-e Sharqi District.
