= Azna =

Azna may refer to:

- Azna County, a county in Lorestan Province in Iran
- Azna, Lorestan, the capital of Azna County, Iran
- Azna, Dorud, a village in Lorestan Province, Iran
- Azna Rural District, a rural district in Lorestan Province, Iran
- Azna Mehalmak, a village in Lorestan Province, Iran
- Azna (people), animists among the Hausa people
