= Dejani =

Dejani may refer to:

- a village in the municipality of Recea, Brașov, Romania
- Deh Jani, a village in Iran
