= Juz =

Juz or JUZ may refer to:

- juz', one of the thirty parts into which Quran is sometimes divided
- jüz, one of the three main territorial divisions in the Kypchak Plain area that covers much of the contemporary Kazakhstan:
  - Senior jüz
  - Middle jüz
  - Junior jüz
- Juz Entertainment, an artist agency and record label in Kazakhstan
- Jowz (also Romanized as Juz), a village in Iran
- Quzhou Airport, in Zhejiang Province, China (IATA airport code JUZ)
