= Ivandeh =

Village in Lorestan province, Iran

Ivandeh Persian: ايونده
- Village
- Location within Iran
- Coordinates: 33°17′20″N 49°38′58″E
- Country: Iran
- Province: Lorestan
- County: Aligudarz
- District: Borborud-e Gharbi
- Rural District: Borborud-e Gharbi

Population (2016)
  - Total: 40
- Time zone: UTC+3:30 (IRST)

Ivandeh (Persian: ايونده) (Note: Also romanized as Ayūndeh and Īvandeh; also known as Īvand) is a village in Borborud-e Gharbi Rural District of Borborud-e Gharbi District in Aligudarz County, Lorestan province, Iran.

== Demographics ==
=== Population ===
At the time of the 2006 National Census, the village's population was 64 in 13 households, when it was in the Central District. The following census in 2011 counted 57 people in 15 households. The 2016 census measured the population of the village as 40 people in 10 households, by which time the rural district had been separated from the district in the formation of Borborud-e Gharbi District.
