= Shahpurabad, Aligudarz =

City in Lorestan province, Iran

Shahpurabad Persian: شاهپوراباد
- City
- Location within Iran
- Coordinates: 33°14′54″N 49°42′08″E
- Country: Iran
- Province: Lorestan
- County: Aligudarz
- District: Borborud-e Gharbi
- Established as a city: 2018

Population (2016)
  - Total: 1,522
- Time zone: UTC+3:30 (IRST)

Shahpurabad (Persian: شاهپوراباد) (Note: Also romanized as Shahpoor Abad and Shāhpūrābād; also known as Abūz̄arābād) is a city in, and the capital of, Borborud-e Gharbi District in Aligudarz County, Lorestan province, Iran. As a village, it was the capital of Borborud-e Gharbi Rural District until its capital was transferred to the village of Zazam.

== Demographics ==
=== Population ===
At the time of the 2006 National Census, Shahpurabad's population was 1,364 in 276 households, when it was a village in Borborud-e Gharbi Rural District of the Central District. The following census in 2011 counted 1,593 people in 400 households. The 2016 census measured the population as 1,522 people in 404 households, by which time the rural district had been separated from the district in the formation of Borborud-e Gharbi District. The village was the most populous in its rural district and was converted to a city in 2018.
