= Chaman Soltan =

City in Lorestan province, Iran

Chaman Soltan Persian: چمن سلطان
- City
- Location within Iran
- Coordinates: 33°17′14″N 49°53′37″E
- Country: Iran
- Province: Lorestan
- County: Aligudarz
- District: Borborud-e Sharqi
- Established as a city: 2018

Population (2016)
  - Total: 2,091
- Time zone: UTC+3:30 (IRST)

Chaman Soltan (Persian: چمن سلطان) (Note: Also romanized as Chaman Solţān; also known as Cham Solţān, Chaman Sultān, and Chaman-i-Sultān) is a city in, and the capital of, Borborud-e Sharqi District in Aligudarz County, Lorestan province, Iran. As a village, it was the capital of Borborud-e Sharqi Rural District until its capital was transferred to the village of Duzan.

== Demographics ==
=== Population ===
At the time of the 2006 National Census, Chaman Soltan's population was 2,483 in 571 households, when it was a village in Borborud-e Sharqi Rural District of the Central District. The following census in 2011 counted 2,334 people in 628 households. The 2016 census measured the population as 2,091 people in 654 households, by which time the rural district had been separated from the district in the formation of Borborud-e Sharqi District. The village was the most populous in its rural district.

Chaman Soltan was converted to a city in 2018.
