= Eyvand =

Eyvand or Ivand (Persian: ايوند) may refer to:

- Ivand, Lorestan
- Eyvand-e Now, Markazi Province
