= Khomeh-ye Sofla =

Village in Lorestan province, Iran

Khomeh-ye Sofla Persian: خمه سفلي
- Village
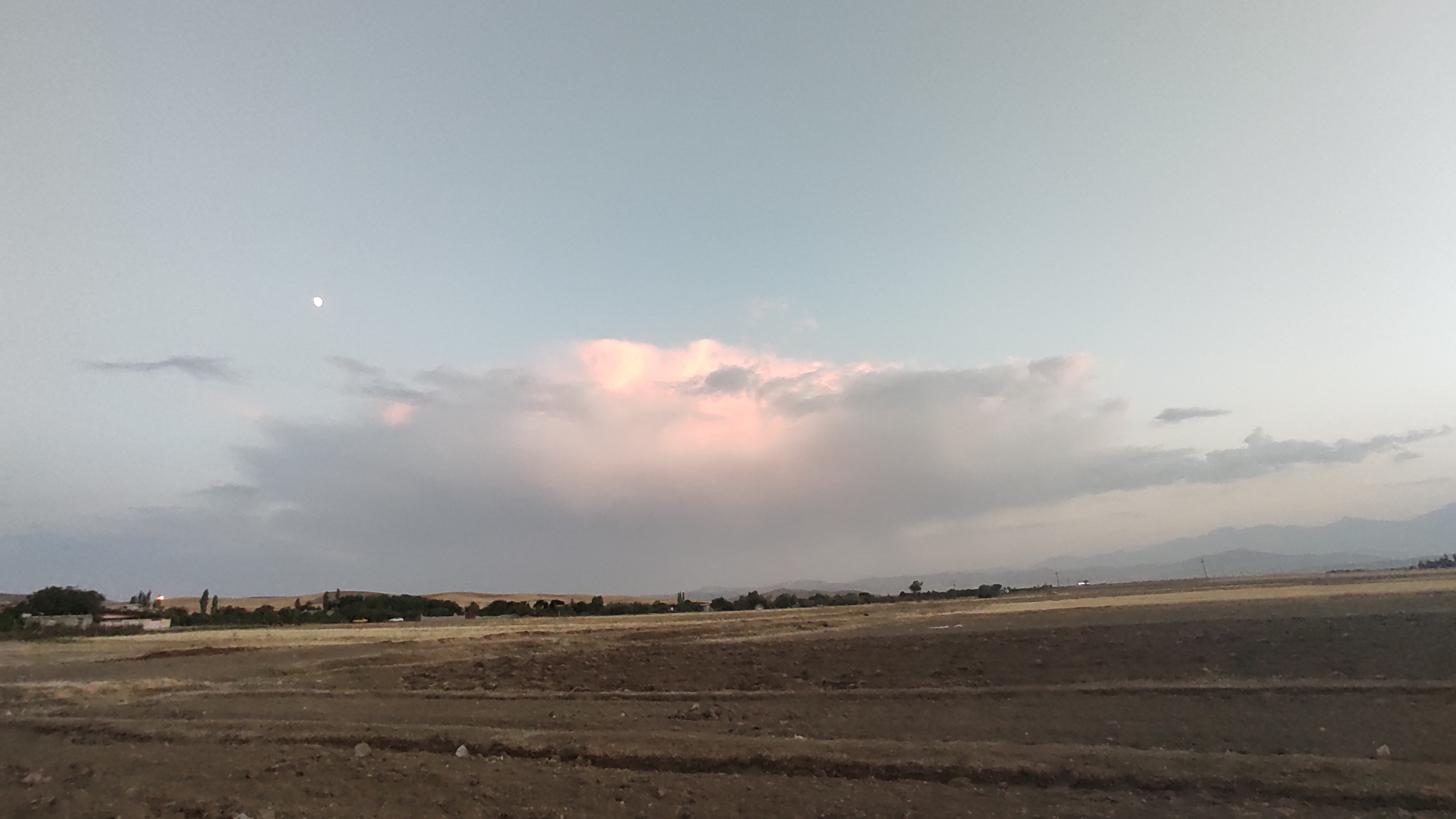
- The village of Khomeh-ye Sofla

- Location within Iran
- Coordinates: 33°28′05″N 49°41′43″E
- Country: Iran
- Province: Lorestan
- County: Aligudarz
- District: Central
- Rural District: Khomeh

Population (2016)
  - Total: 731
- Time zone: UTC+3:30 (IRST)

Khomeh-ye Sofla (Persian: خمه سفلي) (Note: Also romanized as Khomeh Soflá; also known as Khomeh-ye Pā’īn and Khvomeh-ye Pā’īn) is a village in, and the capital of, Khomeh Rural District in the Central District of Aligudarz County, Lorestan province, Iran.

== Demographics ==
=== Population ===
At the time of the 2006 National Census, the village's population, as Khomeh-ye Sofla, was 860 in 188 households. The following census in 2011 counted 849 people in 236 households, by which time the village was listed as Khomeh-ye Pain. The 2016 census measured the population of the village as 731 people in 227 households, the most populous in its rural district.
