= Haji Abad Japlogh =

Haji Abad Japlogh (Persian: حاجي اباد ﺟﺍپﻝﻍ) may refer to:

- Haji Abad Japlogh, Lorestan
- Haji Abad Japlogh, Markazi
