= Bornabad, Lorestan =

Village in Lorestan province, Iran

Bornabad Persian: برن آباد
- Village
- Location within Iran
- Coordinates: 33°25′17″N 49°32′53″E
- Country: Iran
- Province: Lorestan
- County: Aligudarz
- District: Central
- Rural District: Pachehlak-e Sharqi

Population (2016)
  - Total: 559
- Time zone: UTC+3:30 (IRST)

Bornabad (Persian: برن آباد) (Note: Also romanized as Barnābād and Bornābād; also known as Bornābād-e Bālā (برناباد بالا), also romanized as Bornābād Bālā) is a village in Pachehlak-e Sharqi Rural District of the Central District in Aligudarz County, Lorestan province, Iran.

== Demographics ==
=== Population ===
At the time of the 2006 National Census, the village's population was 294 in 53 households. The following census in 2011 counted 314 people in 70 households. The 2016 census measured the population of the village as 559 people in 115 households.
