= Nakam Castle =

Castle in Lorestan Province, Iran

Nakam castle
- قلعه ناکام

General information
- Type: Castle
- Location: Aligudarz County, Iran

Nakam castle (Persian: قلعه ناکام) is a historical castle located in Aligudarz County in Lorestan Province, The longevity of this fortress dates back to the Qajar dynasty.
