= Khomeh-ye Olya =

Village in Lorestan province, Iran

Khomeh-ye Olya Persian: خمه عليا
- Village
- Location within Iran
- Coordinates: 33°28′52″N 49°44′20″E
- Country: Iran
- Province: Lorestan
- County: Aligudarz
- District: Central
- Rural District: Khomeh

Population (2016)
  - Total: 646
- Time zone: UTC+3:30 (IRST)

Khomeh-ye Olya (Persian: خمه عليا) (Note: Also romanized as Khomeh Olya and Khomeh-ye 'Olyā; also known as Khomeh Bālā, Khomeh-ye Bālā, Khowmb-e Bālā, Khumbe Bāla, and Khvomeh-ye Bālā) is a village in Khomeh Rural District of the Central District in Aligudarz County, Lorestan province, Iran.

== Demographics ==
=== Population ===
At the time of the 2006 National Census, the village's population, as Khomeh-ye Olya, was 755 in 149 households. The following census in 2011 counted 623 people in 171 households, by which time the village was listed as Khomeh-ye Bala. The 2016 census measured the population of the village as 646 people in 206 households.
