= Shahrak-e Bornabad =

Village in Lorestan province, Iran

Shahrak-e Bornabad Persian: شهرک برن آباد
- Village
- Location within Iran
- Coordinates: 33°26′13″N 49°33′01″E
- Country: Iran
- Province: Lorestan
- County: Aligudarz
- District: Central
- Rural District: Pachehlak-e Sharqi

Population (2016)
  - Total: 456
- Time zone: UTC+3:30 (IRST)

Shahrak-e Bornabad (Persian: شهرک برن آباد) (Note: Also romanized as Shahrak-e Bornābād) is a village in Pachehlak-e Sharqi Rural District of the Central District in Aligudarz County, Lorestan province, Iran.

== Demographics ==
=== Population ===
At the time of the 2006 National Census, the village's population was 377 in 83 households. The following census in 2011 counted 448 people in 134 households. The 2016 census measured the population of the village as 456 people in 132 households.
