= Kan Sorkh =

Village in Lorestan province, Iran

Kan Sorkh Persian: كانسرخ
- Village
- Location within Iran
- Coordinates: 33°16′32″N 49°33′36″E
- Country: Iran
- Province: Lorestan
- County: Aligudarz
- District: Central
- Rural District: Pachehlak-e Sharqi

Population (2016)
  - Total: 726
- Time zone: UTC+3:30 (IRST)

Kan Sorkh (Persian: كانسرخ) (Note: Also romanized as Kān Sorkh; also known as Khūnsorkh and Khūnsurkh) is a village in Pachehlak-e Sharqi Rural District of the Central District in Aligudarz County, Lorestan province, Iran.

== Demographics ==
=== Population ===
At the time of the 2006 National Census, the village's population was 876 in 157 households. The following census in 2011 counted 860 people in 181 households. The 2016 census measured the population of the village as 726 people in 179 households.
