= Borm, Lorestan =

Village in Lorestan province, Iran

Borm Persian: برم
- Village
- Location within Iran
- Coordinates: 33°14′55″N 49°40′39″E
- Country: Iran
- Province: Lorestan
- County: Aligudarz
- District: Borborud-e Gharbi
- Rural District: Borborud-e Gharbi

Population (2016)
  - Total: 344
- Time zone: UTC+3:30 (IRST)

Borm (Persian: برم) (Note: Also romanized as Barm) is a village in Borborud-e Gharbi Rural District of Borborud-e Gharbi District in Aligudarz County, Lorestan province, Iran.

== Demographics ==
=== Population ===
At the time of the 2006 National Census, the village's population was 345 in 63 households, when it was in the Central District. The following census in 2011 counted 344 people in 78 households. The 2016 census measured the population of the village as 344 people in 81 households, by which time the rural district had been separated from the district in the formation of Borborud-e Gharbi District.
