= Kaykan =

Kaykan may refer to:

- Svetlana Kaykan, Russian speed skater
- Gaygan, a village in Iran
