= Pachehlak =

Pachehlak may refer to:

- Pachehlak-e Gharbi Rural District
- Pachehlak-e Sharqi Rural District
