= Aligudarz =

City in Lorestan province, Iran

Aligudarz Persian: اليگودرز
- City
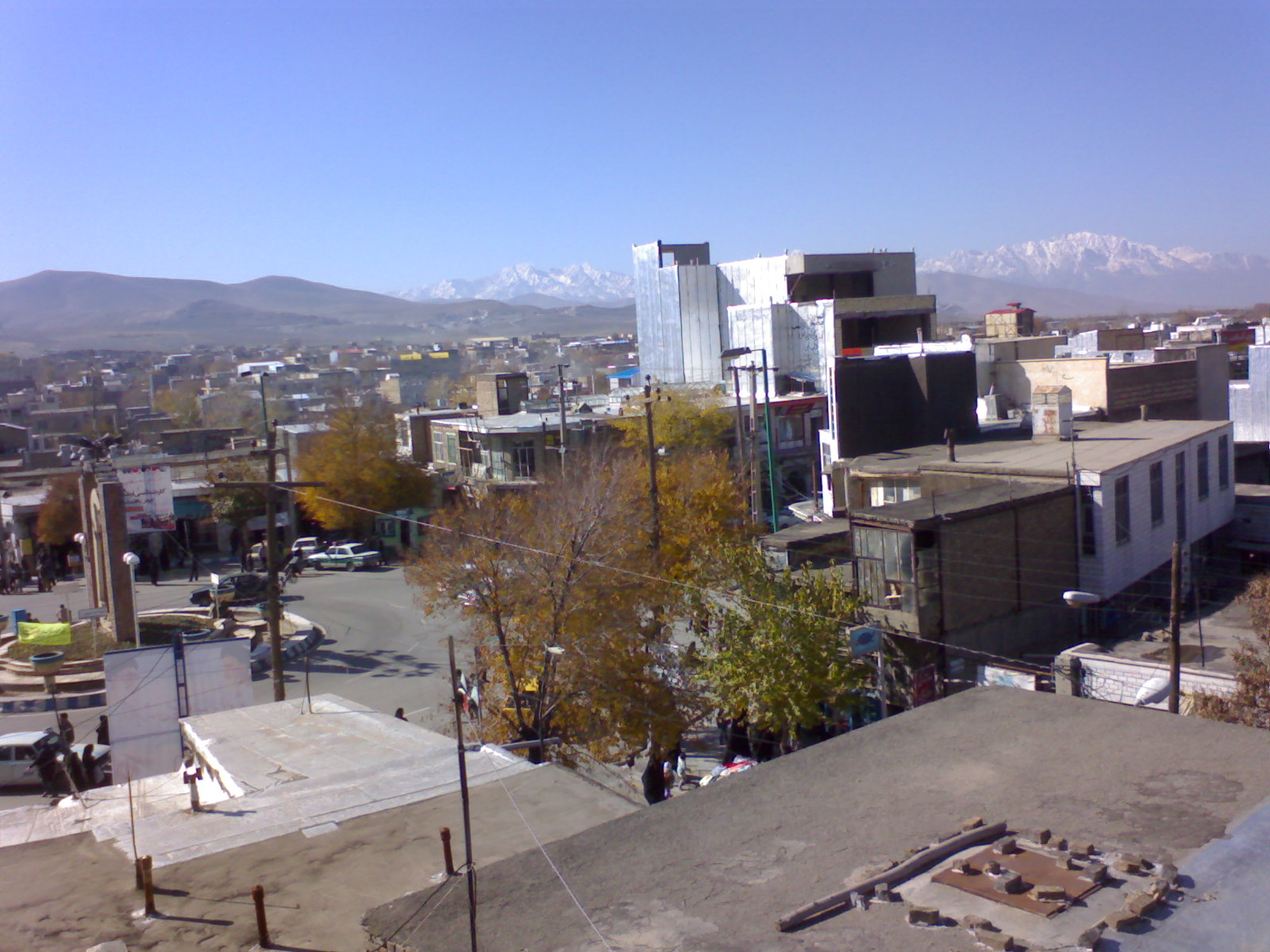
- Central Square of Aligudarz

- Location within Iran
- Coordinates: 33°24′09″N 49°41′25″E
- Country: Iran
- Province: Lorestan
- County: Aligudarz
- District: Central

Population (2016)
  - Total: 89,268
- Time zone: UTC+3:30 (IRST)
- Climate: Csa

Aligudarz (Persian: اليگودرز) (Note: Also known as ‘Ali Gudār) is a city in the Central District of Aligudarz County, Lorestan province, Iran, serving as capital of both the county and the district.

== Demographics ==
=== Population ===
At the time of the 2006 National Census, the city's population was 78,690 in 18,115 households. The following census in 2011 counted 87,967 people in 23,181 households. The 2016 census measured the population of the city as 89,268 people in 25,646 households.

== Geography ==
=== Location ===
Aligudarz is located 420 kilometres (260 mi) from Tehran and is in a region that is a mixture of plains and foothills, thus enjoying a mountainous, mild climate. Oshtorankuh Mountain range and Aligudarz River are here.

=== Climate ===
Aligudarz has a dry-summer continental climate (Dsa), bordering on a mediterranean climate (Csa) in Köppen climate classification.

Climate data for Aligoodarz (1991-2020, extremes 1986-present)
Month	Jan	Feb	Mar	Apr	May	Jun	Jul	Aug	Sep	Oct	Nov	Dec	Year
Record high °C (°F)	16.7 (62.1)	18.6 (65.5)	25.2 (77.4)	28.0 (82.4)	32.0 (89.6)	39.4 (102.9)	41.0 (105.8)	38.0 (100.4)	35.0 (95.0)	30.0 (86.0)	22.6 (72.7)	20.0 (68.0)	41.0 (105.8)
Mean daily maximum °C (°F)	5.0 (41.0)	7.2 (45.0)	12.1 (53.8)	17.3 (63.1)	23.1 (73.6)	30.1 (86.2)	33.7 (92.7)	33.2 (91.8)	28.9 (84.0)	21.7 (71.1)	13.2 (55.8)	8.0 (46.4)	19.5 (67.0)
Daily mean °C (°F)	−0.6 (30.9)	1.6 (34.9)	6.1 (43.0)	11.2 (52.2)	16.4 (61.5)	22.5 (72.5)	26.3 (79.3)	25.7 (78.3)	21.0 (69.8)	14.5 (58.1)	7.1 (44.8)	2.3 (36.1)	12.8 (55.1)
Mean daily minimum °C (°F)	−5.4 (22.3)	−3.3 (26.1)	0.5 (32.9)	5.1 (41.2)	9.0 (48.2)	13.1 (55.6)	17.4 (63.3)	17.0 (62.6)	12.3 (54.1)	7.4 (45.3)	1.8 (35.2)	−2.3 (27.9)	6.1 (42.9)
Record low °C (°F)	−31.0 (−23.8)	−20.0 (−4.0)	−17.4 (0.7)	−7.0 (19.4)	0.8 (33.4)	6.4 (43.5)	10.0 (50.0)	9.0 (48.2)	4.6 (40.3)	−2.0 (28.4)	−11.8 (10.8)	−17.6 (0.3)	−31.0 (−23.8)
Average precipitation mm (inches)	48.3 (1.90)	48.5 (1.91)	71.5 (2.81)	66.9 (2.63)	25.2 (0.99)	1.9 (0.07)	2.0 (0.08)	0.9 (0.04)	1.7 (0.07)	22.5 (0.89)	51.8 (2.04)	55.8 (2.20)	397 (15.63)
Average precipitation days (≥ 1.0 mm)	5.9	6.2	7.2	7.3	3.9	0.5	0.4	0.2	0.3	3	5.1	6.4	46.4
Average rainy days	4	5	9.3	10.8	5.9	0.7	0.9	0.4	0.6	4.7	7.9	6.1	56.3
Average snowy days	7.5	6.8	4.1	0.8	0.0	0.0	0.0	0.0	0.0	0.0	0.9	5.0	25.1
Average relative humidity (%)	62	58	51	47	39	24	21	20	22	35	53	60	41
Average dew point °C (°F)	−7.5 (18.5)	−6.4 (20.5)	−4.6 (23.7)	−1.0 (30.2)	0.9 (33.6)	0.1 (32.2)	1.6 (34.9)	0.6 (33.1)	−2.4 (27.7)	−2.3 (27.9)	−3.0 (26.6)	−5.3 (22.5)	−2.4 (27.6)
Mean monthly sunshine hours	203	204	231	241	305	354	336	337	319	271	208	195	3,204
Source 1: NCEI
Source 2: IRIMO (snow/sleet days 1986-2010 and extremes) , meteomanz

== Main sights ==
In the mountains and hills around Aligudarz, ancient objects have been discovered, including rectangular brick earthenware from the thirteenth century AD.

Important natural and historical sites of Aligudarz include:

- Ab Sefid (literally "White Water") waterfall
- Aligudarz Forests
- Sayleh castle
- Tamandar and Bexnavid caves
- Masisilan Ancient Hill
- Mandish mountain
- Chakan Waterfall
- Shoul Abad landscapes
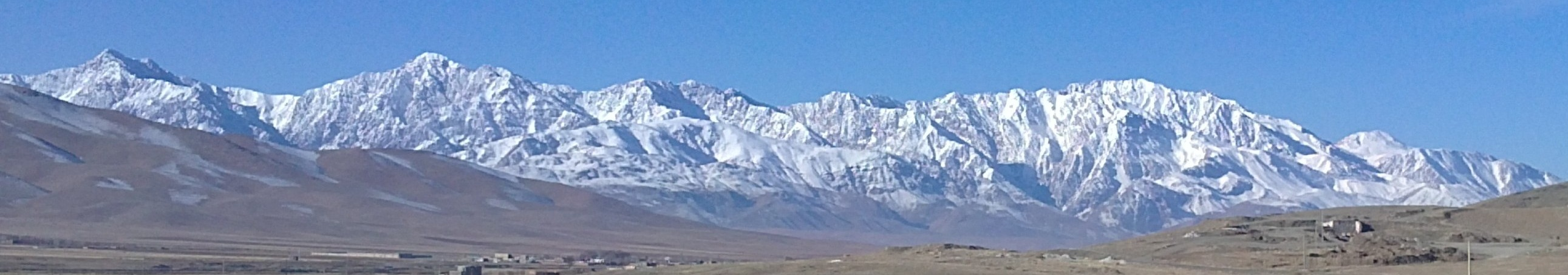
Oshtoran Kooh Mountain

== Notable people ==
- Mehdi Karroubi, politician
- Morteza Mousavi, Shia Cleric
- Hamed Lak, football player
- Omid, singer

== Gallery ==
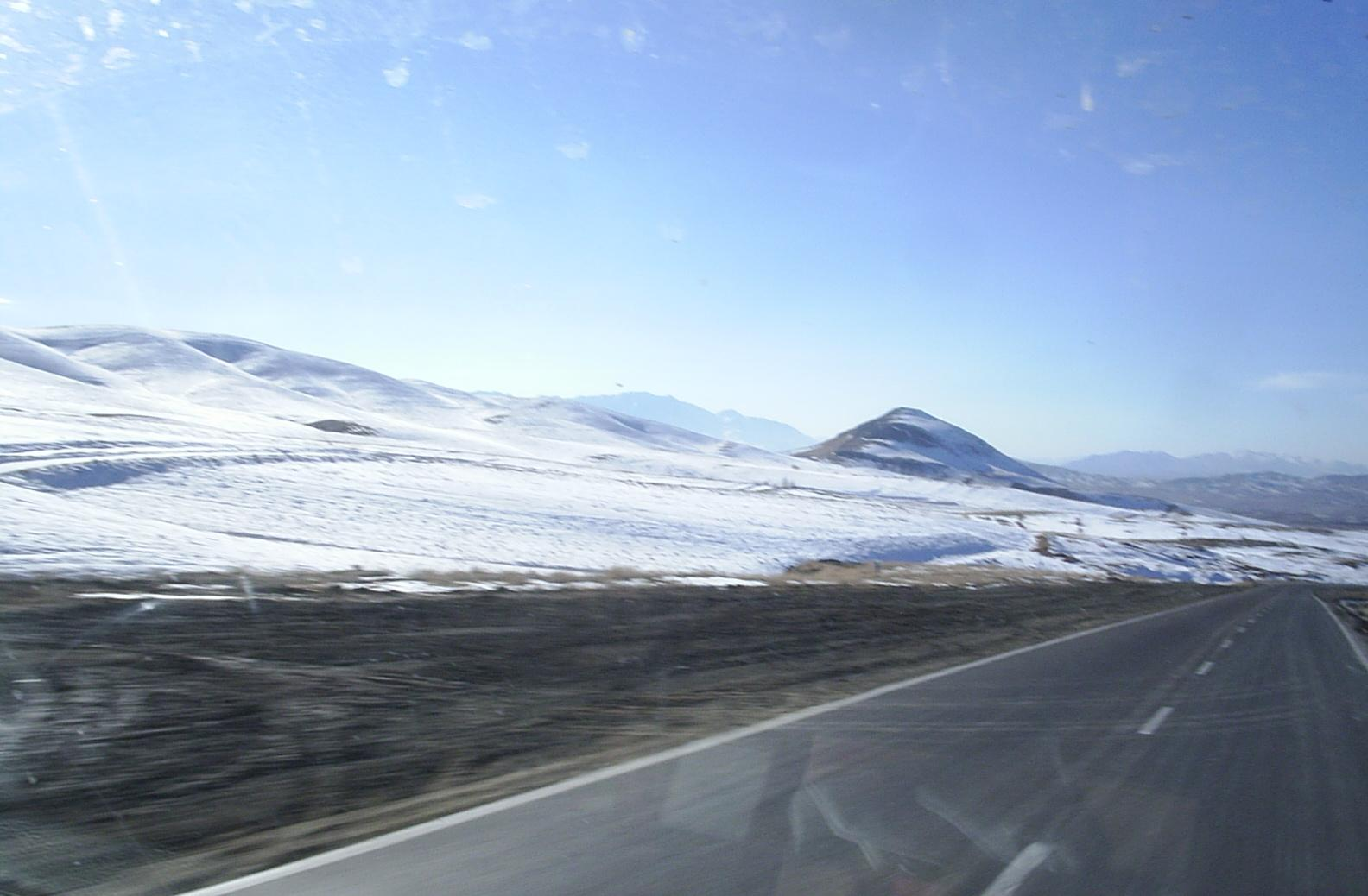
Road in vicinity of Aligoudarz at winter.

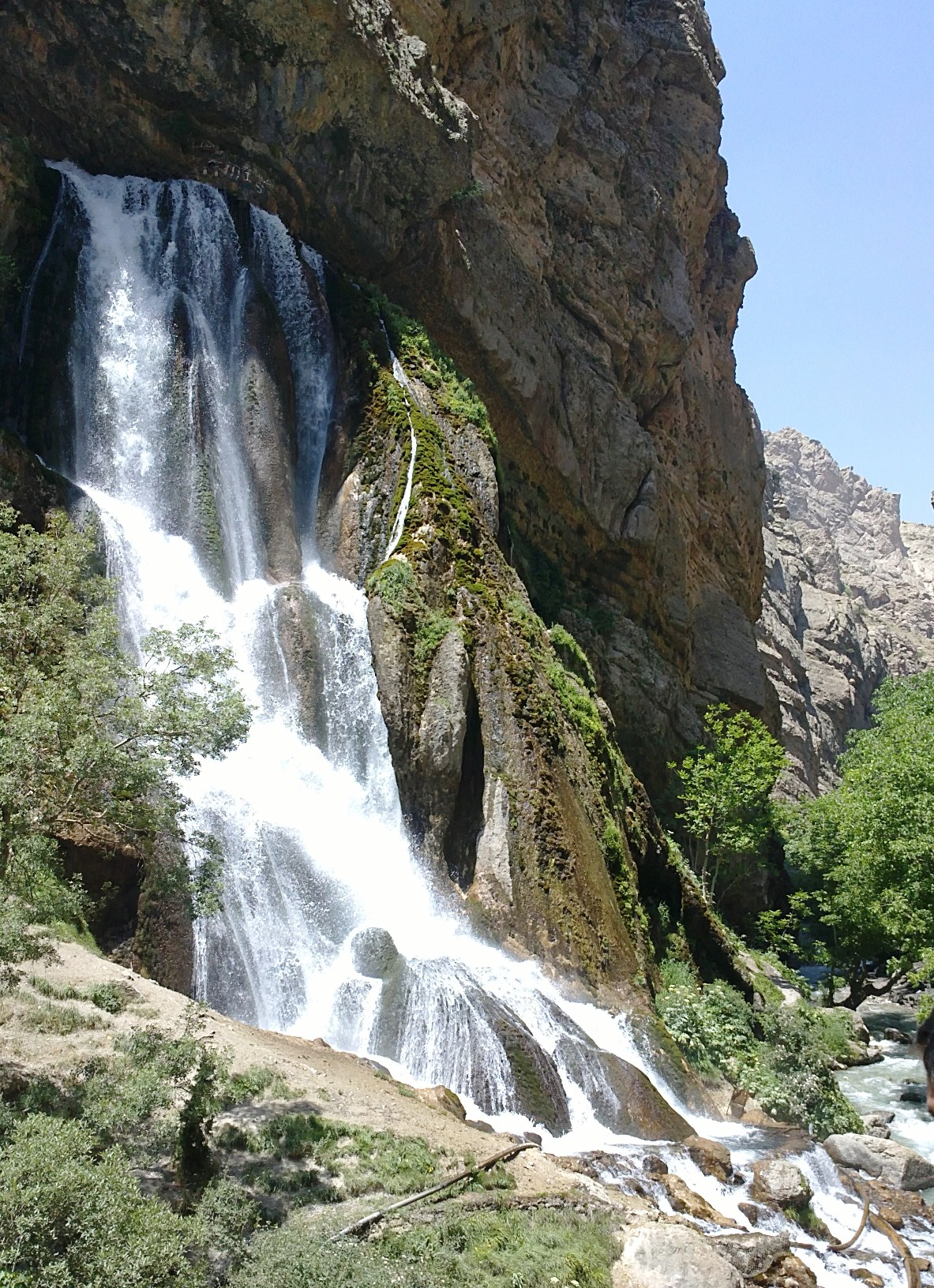
Ab Sefid Waterfall
