= Abdolreza, Andika =

Coordinates: 32°05′01.3″N 49°35′05.7″E

Abdolreza عبدالرضا
- Village
- Interactive map of Abdolreza
- Country: Iran
- Province: Khuzestan
- County: Andika
- Bakhsh: Abezhdan
- Rural District: Kushk

Population (2006)
  - Total: 102
- Time zone: UTC+3:30 (IRST)
  - Summer (DST): UTC+4:30 (IRDT)

Abdolreza (Persian: عبدالرضا, also Romanized as ʿAbdolrez̤ā) is a village in Kushk Rural District, Abezhdan District, Andika County, Khuzestan Province, Iran. At the 2006 census, its population was 102, in 17 families.
