= Borborud-e Sharqi Rural District =

Rural district in Lorestan province, Iran

Borborud-e Sharqi Rural District Persian: دهستان بربرود شرقی
- Rural District
- Location within Iran
- Coordinates: 33°16′N 49°54′E
- Country: Iran
- Province: Lorestan
- County: Aligudarz
- District: Borborud-e Sharqi
- Established: 1987
- Capital: Duzan

Population (2016)
  - Total: 8,467
- Time zone: UTC+3:30 (IRST)

Borborud-e Sharqi Rural District (Persian: دهستان بربرود شرقی) is in Borborud-e Sharqi District of Aligudarz County, Lorestan province, Iran. Its capital is the village of Duzan. The previous capital of the rural district was the village of Chaman Soltan, now a city.

== Demographics ==
=== Population ===
At the time of the 2006 National Census, the rural district's population was 9,539 (as a part of the Central District) in 2,086 households. There were 8,715 inhabitants in 2,311 households at the following census of 2011. The 2016 census measured the population of the rural district as 8,467 in 2,472 households, by which time the rural district had been separated from the district in the formation of Borborud-e Sharqi District. The most populous of its 22 villages was Chaman Soltan (now a city), with 2,091 people.

=== Other villages in the rural district ===
- Ab Barik-e Olya
- Ab Barik-e Sofla
- Asgaran
- Asmahur-e Bala
- Asmahur-e Pain
- Azna Mehalmak
- Bad Bad
- Bahramabad
- Baqerabad
- Gandomineh
- Gaygan
- Jowz
- Moghanak-e Bala
- Moghanak-e Pain
- Qaleh-ye Abd ol Reza
- Qaleh-ye Khalileh
- Roknabad
- Sang-e Sefid
