= Jamal Ahmad =

Jamal Ahmad جمال احمد
- Village
- Location within Iran
- Coordinates: 27°09′23″N 56°04′21″E
- Country: Iran
- Province: Hormozgan
- County: Bandar Abbas
- Bakhsh: Central
- Rural District: Gachin

Population (2006)
  - Total: 956
- Time zone: UTC+3:30 (IRST)
  - Summer (DST): UTC+4:30 (IRDT)

Jamal Ahmad (Persian: جمال احمد, also Romanized as Jamāl Aḩmad and Jammāl Ahmad; also known as Jamāl Aḩmad-e Bālā, Khoon Sorkh, Khūn-e-Sorkh, Khūn Sorkh, Khūn Surkh, and Kūnsoīkh Jamāl Aḩmad-e Bālā) is a village in Gachin Rural District, in the Central District of Bandar Abbas County, Hormozgan Province, Iran. At the 2006 census, its population was 956, in 251 families.
