= Barm-e Shur =

Barm-e Shur برم شور
- Village
- Location within Iran
- Coordinates: 30°05′09″N 50°59′36″E
- Country: Iran
- Province: Fars
- County: Mamasani
- Bakhsh: Mahvarmilani
- Rural District: Mishan

Population (2006)
  - Total: 21
- Time zone: UTC+3:30 (IRST)
  - Summer (DST): UTC+4:30 (IRDT)

Barm-e Shur (Persian: برم شور, also Romanized as Barm-e Shūr) is a village in Mishan Rural District, Mahvarmilani District, Mamasani County, Fars province, Iran. At the 2006 census, its population was 21, in 5 families.
