= Borm-e Shir =

Borm-e Shir برم شير
- Village
- Location within Iran
- Coordinates: 30°55′30″N 50°27′53″E
- Country: Iran
- Province: Kohgiluyeh and Boyer-Ahmad
- County: Kohgiluyeh
- Bakhsh: Central
- Rural District: Rak

Population (2006)
  - Total: 36
- Time zone: UTC+3:30 (IRST)
  - Summer (DST): UTC+4:30 (IRDT)

Borm-e Shir (Persian: برم شير, also Romanized as Borm-e Shīr) is a village in Rak Rural District, in the Central District of Kohgiluyeh County, Kohgiluyeh and Boyer-Ahmad Province, Iran. At the 2006 census, its population was 36, in 7 families.
