= Borm-e Sabz =

Barm-e Sabz بَرمِ سَبز
- Village
- Location within Iran
- Coordinates: 30°52′52″N 50°24′23″E
- Country: Iran
- Province: Kohgiluyeh and Boyer-Ahmad
- County: Kohgiluyeh
- Bakhsh: Central
- Rural District: Tayebi-ye Garmsiri-ye Jonubi

Population (2006)
  - Total: 138
- Time zone: UTC+3:30 (IRST)
  - Summer (DST): UTC+4:30 (IRDT)

Barm-e Sabz (Persian: بَرمِ سَبز; also known as Barmeh Sabz) is a village in Tayebi-ye Garmsiri-ye Jonubi Rural District, in the Central District of Kohgiluyeh County, Kohgiluyeh and Boyer-Ahmad Province, Iran. At the 2006 census, its population was 138, in 35 families.
