= Asgaran, Kurdistan =

Asgaran عسگران
- Village
- Location within Iran
- Coordinates: 35°05′25″N 46°54′34″E
- Country: Iran
- Province: Kurdistan
- County: Sanandaj
- Bakhsh: Central
- Rural District: Naran

Population (2006)
  - Total: 201
- Time zone: UTC+3:30 (IRST)
  - Summer (DST): UTC+4:30 (IRDT)

Asgaran (Persian: عسگران, also Romanized as ‘Asgarān; also known as ‘Askarān) is a village in Naran Rural District, in the Central District of Sanandaj County, Kurdistan Province, Iran. At the 2006 census, its population was 201, in 48 families. The village is populated by Kurds.
