= Barm-e Jamal =

Barm-e Jamal برم جمال
- Village
- Location within Iran
- Coordinates: 29°57′26″N 51°47′10″E
- Country: Iran
- Province: Fars
- County: Mamasani
- Bakhsh: Doshman Ziari
- Rural District: Mashayekh

Population (2006)
  - Total: 86
- Time zone: UTC+3:30 (IRST)
  - Summer (DST): UTC+4:30 (IRDT)

Barm-e Jamal (Persian: برم جمال, also Romanized as Barm-e Jamāl) is a village in Mashayekh Rural District, Doshman Ziari District, Mamasani County, Fars province, Iran. At the 2006 census, its population was 86, in 16 families.
