= Khun Sorkh, Jiroft =

Khun Sorkh خون سرخ
- Village
- Location within Iran
- Coordinates: 28°52′08″N 57°51′32″E
- Country: Iran
- Province: Kerman
- County: Jiroft
- Bakhsh: Jebalbarez
- Rural District: Saghder

Population (2006)
  - Total: 33
- Time zone: UTC+3:30 (IRST)
  - Summer (DST): UTC+4:30 (IRDT)

Khun Sorkh (Persian: خون سرخ, also Romanized as Khūn Sorkh and Khūn-e Sorkh) is a village in Saghder Rural District, Jebalbarez District, Jiroft County, Kerman Province, Iran. At the 2006 census, its population was 33, in 7 families.
