= Eyvand-e Now =

Eyvand-e Now ايوندنو
- Village
- Location within Iran
- Coordinates: 34°13′36″N 49°21′44″E
- Country: Iran
- Province: Markazi
- County: Khondab
- Bakhsh: Qareh Chay
- Rural District: Javersiyan

Population (2006)
  - Total: 143
- Time zone: UTC+3:30 (IRST)
  - Summer (DST): UTC+4:30 (IRDT)

Eyvand-e Now (Persian: ايوندنو; also known as Eyvand-e Soflá) is a village in Javersiyan Rural District, Qareh Chay District, Khondab County, Markazi Province, Iran. At the 2006 census, its population was 143, in 34 families.
