= Deh-e Salman, Markazi =

Deh-e Salman ده سلمان
- Village
- Location within Iran
- Coordinates: 33°40′07″N 49°19′00″E
- Country: Iran
- Province: Markazi
- County: Shazand
- Bakhsh: Sarband
- Rural District: Hendudar

Population (2006)
  - Total: 196
- Time zone: UTC+3:30 (IRST)
  - Summer (DST): UTC+4:30 (IRDT)

Deh-e Salman (Persian: ده سلمان, also Romanized as Deh-e Salmān and Deh Salmān) is a village in Hendudar Rural District, Sarband District, Shazand County, Markazi Province, Iran. At the 2006 census, its population was 196, in 45 families.
