= Moqanak, Tehran =

Moqanak مقانك
- village
- Location within Iran
- Coordinates: 35°33′19″N 52°15′43″E
- Country: Iran
- Province: Tehran
- County: Damavand
- Bakhsh: Central
- Rural District: Abarshiveh
- Elevation: 1,760 m (5,770 ft)

Population (2016)
  - Total: 104
- Time zone: UTC+3:30 (IRST)

Moqanak (Persian: مقانك, also Romanized as Moqānak, Māghaunak, and Moghānak) is a village in Abarshiveh Rural District, in the Central District of Damavand County, Tehran Province, Iran. At the 2016 census, its population was 104, in 37 families. Down from 169 in 2006.
