= Moqanak, Qazvin =

Moqanak مقانك
- Village
- Location within Iran
- Coordinates: 36°36′48″N 49°03′40″E
- Country: Iran
- Province: Qazvin
- County: Qazvin
- Bakhsh: Tarom Sofla
- Rural District: Chuqur

Population (2006)
  - Total: 57
- Time zone: UTC+3:30 (IRST)
  - Summer (DST): UTC+4:30 (IRDT)

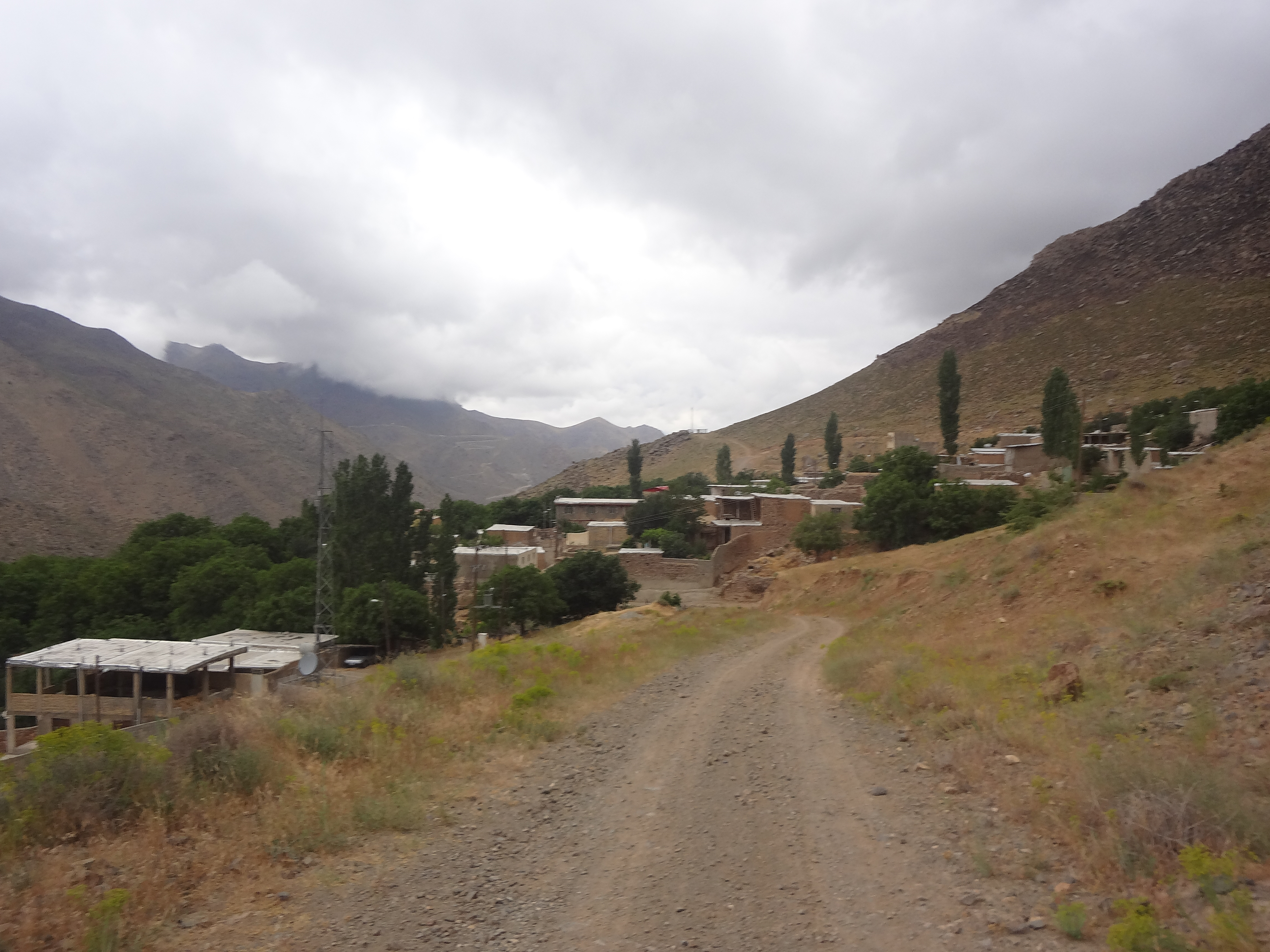
A photo of Moqanak.

Moqanak (Persian: مقانك, also Romanized as Moqānak, Moghānak, Mīqānak, Mowkanak, Mukanak, and Muqanak) is a village in Chuqur Rural District, Tarom Sofla District, Qazvin County, Qazvin Province, Iran. At the 2006 census, its population was 57, in 20 families.
