= Pachehlak-e Sharqi Rural District =

Rural district in Lorestan province, Iran

Pachehlak-e Sharqi Rural District Persian: دهستان پاچه لك شرقي
- Rural District
- Location within Iran
- Coordinates: 33°19′N 49°35′E
- Country: Iran
- Province: Lorestan
- County: Aligudarz
- District: Central
- Established: 1987
- Capital: Sur

Population (2016)
  - Total: 6,626
- Time zone: UTC+3:30 (IRST)

Pachehlak-e Sharqi Rural District (Persian: دهستان پاچه لك شرقي) is in the Central District of Aligudarz County, Lorestan province, Iran. Its capital is the village of Sur.

== Demographics ==
=== Population ===
At the time of the 2006 National Census, the rural district's population was 6,478 in 1,262 households. There were 6,165 inhabitants in 1,530 households at the following census of 2011. The 2016 census measured the population of the rural district as 6,626 in 1,727 households. The most populous of its 25 villages was Deh-e Nasir, with 835 people.

=== Other villages in the rural district ===
- Bornabad
- Deh-e Sefid Kan Sorkh
- Kan Sorkh
- Kashkak
- Sanj
- Shahrak-e Bornabad
