= Khomeh Rural District =

Rural district in Lorestan province, Iran

Khomeh Rural District Persian: دهستان خمه
- Rural District
- Location within Iran
- Coordinates: 33°28′N 49°43′E
- Country: Iran
- Province: Lorestan
- County: Aligudarz
- District: Central
- Established: 1987
- Capital: Khomeh-ye Sofla

Population (2016)
  - Total: 3,759
- Time zone: UTC+3:30 (IRST)

Khomeh Rural District (Persian: دهستان خمه) is in the Central District of Aligudarz County, Lorestan province, Iran. Its capital is the village of Khomeh-ye Sofla.

== Demographics ==
=== Population ===
At the time of the 2006 National Census, the rural district's population was 4,445 in 897 households. There were 4,084 inhabitants in 1,083 households at the following census of 2011. The 2016 census measured the population of the rural district as 3,759 in 1,140 households. The most populous of its 19 villages was Khomeh-ye Sofla, with 731 people.

=== Other villages in the rural district ===
- Gol-e Zard
- Keznar
- Khomeh-ye Olya
- Khvorheh
- Kondor
- Kureh Chi
- Mushleh
