= Borborud-e Gharbi Rural District =

Rural district in Lorestan province, Iran

Borborud-e Gharbi Rural District Persian: دهستان بربرود غربی
- Rural District
- Location within Iran
- Coordinates: 33°15′N 49°43′E
- Country: Iran
- Province: Lorestan
- County: Aligudarz
- District: Borborud-e Gharbi
- Established: 1987
- Capital: Zazam

Population (2016)
  - Total: 6,029
- Time zone: UTC+3:30 (IRST)

Borborud-e Gharbi Rural District (Persian: دهستان بربرود غربی) is in Borborud-e Gharbi District of Aligudarz County, Lorestan province, Iran. Its capital is the village of Zazam. The previous capital of the rural district was the village of Shahpurabad, now a city.

== Demographics ==
=== Population ===
At the time of the 2006 National Census, the rural district's population (as a part of the Central District) was 11,171 in 2,045 households. There were 10,131 inhabitants in 2,345 households at the following census of 2011. The 2016 census measured the population of the rural district as 6,029 in 1,570 households, by which time the rural district had been separated from the district in the formation of Borborud-e Gharbi District. The most populous of its 41 villages was Shahpurabad (now a city), with 1,522 people.

=== Other villages in the rural district ===
- Aliabad Darreh Moshk
- Anuj-e Bala
- Anuj-e Pain
- Borm
- Dahleh
- Dahleh Sufian
- Daricheh
- Deh-e Salman
- Deh Mirza Qoli
- Eslamabad
- Fiqan
- Gallehvand
- Guran
- Hajjiabad Beshaq
- Ivandeh
- Jushan
- Kahriz-e Sorkh
- Kicheh
- Kivarz-e Bala
- Kivarz-e Pain
- Moshkak
- Qasemabad
- Saleh Saghir
- Sang-e Sefid
- Shahriar
- Tiran
