= Borborud-e Sharqi District =

District in Lorestan province, Iran

Borborud-e Sharqi District Persian: بخش بربرود شرقی
- District
- Location within Iran
- Coordinates: 33°14′N 49°51′E
- Country: Iran
- Province: Lorestan
- County: Aligudarz
- Capital: Chaman Soltan

Population (2016)
  - Total: 10,427
- Time zone: UTC+3:30 (IRST)

Borborud-e Sharqi District (Persian: بخش بربرود شرقی) is in Aligudarz County, Lorestan province, Iran. Its capital is the city of Chaman Soltan.

== History ==
After the 2011 National Census, Borborud-e Sharqi and Farsesh Rural Districts were separated from the Central District in the formation of Borborud-e Sharqi District. The village of Chaman Soltan was converted to a city in 2018.

== Demographics ==
=== Population ===
The 2016 census measured the population of the district as 10,427 inhabitants in 3,029 households.

=== Administrative divisions ===
Borborud-e Sharqi District Population
Administrative Divisions	2016
Borborud-e Sharqi RD	8,467
Farsesh RD	1,960
Chaman Soltan (city) (Note: Became a city after the 2016 census)	
Total	10,427
RD = Rural District
