= Borborud-e Gharbi District =

District in Lorestan province, Iran

Borborud-e Gharbi District Persian: بخش بربرود غربی
- District
- Location within Iran
- Coordinates: 33°15′N 49°39′E
- Country: Iran
- Province: Lorestan
- County: Aligudarz
- Capital: Shahpurabad

Population (2016)
  - Total: 9,335
- Time zone: UTC+3:30 (IRST)

Borborud-e Gharbi District (Persian: بخش بربرود غربی) is in Aligudarz County, Lorestan province, Iran. Its capital is the city of Shahpurabad.

== History ==
After the 2011 National Census, Borborud-e Gharbi Rural District was separated from the Central District in the formation of Borborud-e Gharbi District. The village of Shahpurabad was converted to a city in 2018.

== Demographics ==
=== Population ===
The 2016 census measured the population of the district as 9,335 inhabitants in 2,467 households.

=== Administrative divisions ===
Borborud-e Gharbi District Population
Administrative Divisions	2016
Borborud-e Gharbi RD	6,029
Cheshmeh Par RD	3,306
Shahpurabad (city) (Note: Became a city after the 2016 census)	
Total	9,335
RD = Rural District
