= Aligudarz County =

County in Lorestan province, Iran

Aligudarz County Persian: شهرستان الیگودرز
- County
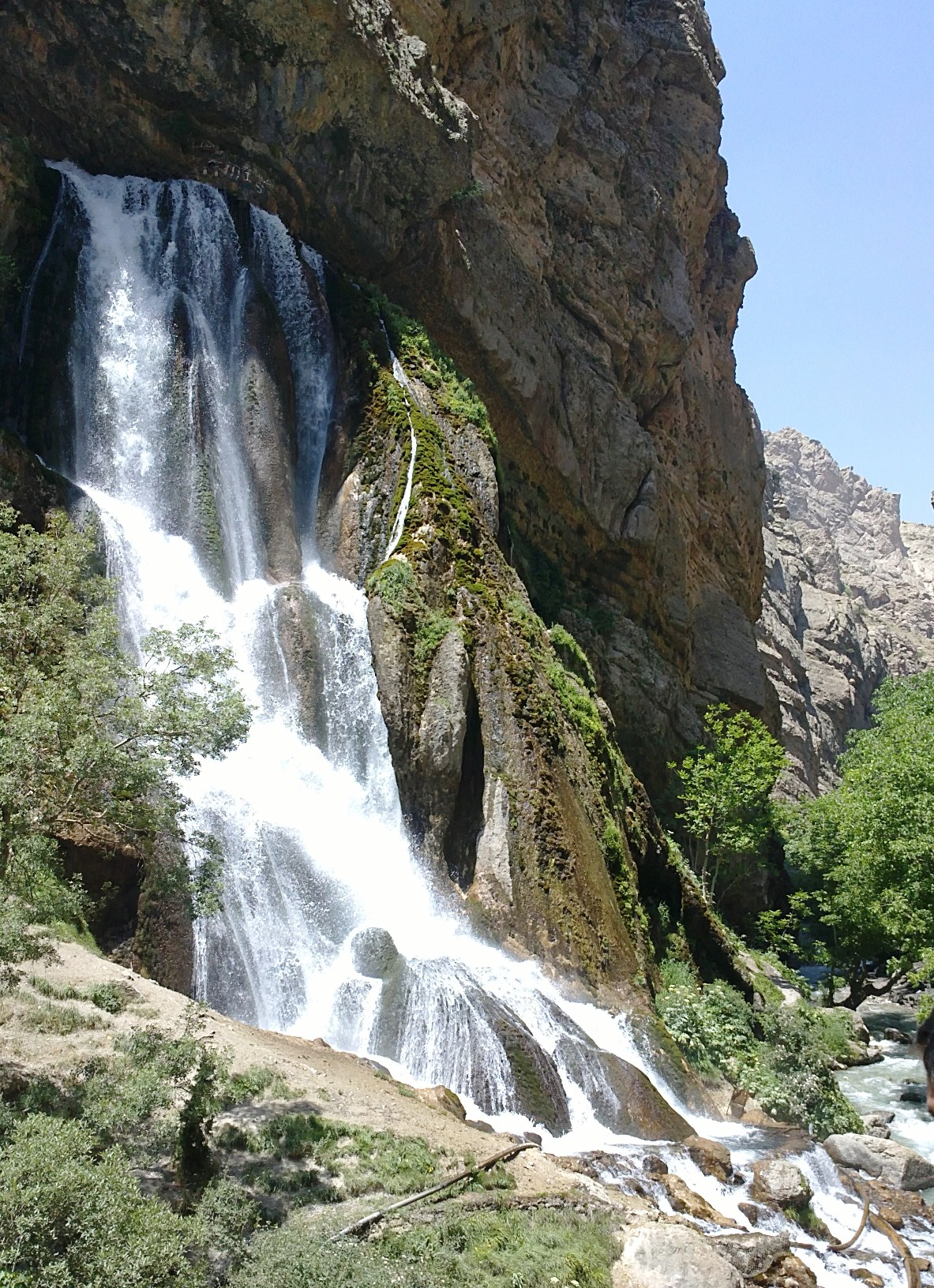
- Ab Sefid Waterfall

- Location of Aligudarz County in Lorestan province (right, green)

- Location of Lorestan province in Iran
- Coordinates: 33°09′N 49°24′E
- Country: Iran
- Province: Lorestan
- Capital: Aligudarz
- Districts: Central, Borborud-e Gharbi, Borborud-e Sharqi, Zalaqi, Zaz and Mahru

Population (2016)
  - Total: 137,534
- Time zone: UTC+3:30 (IRST)

Aligudarz County (Persian: شهرستان الیگودرز) is in Lorestan province, Iran. Its capital is the city of Aligudarz.

== History ==
The village of Shulabad-e Sofla, after merging with several other villages, was converted to a city and renamed Shulabad in 2010.

After the 2011 National Census, Borborud-e Gharbi Rural District was separated from the Central District in the formation of Borborud-e Gharbi District, including the new Cheshmeh Par Rural District. At the same time, Borborud-e Sharqi and Farsesh Rural Districts were also separated from the Central District to form Borborud-e Sharqi District.

The villages of Chaman Soltan and Shahpurabad were converted to cities in 2018, and likewise the village of Titkan in 2021.

== Demographics ==
=== Ethnicity ===
The county is populated by various Lur tribes.

=== Population ===
At the time of the 2006 census, the county's population was 134,802 in 28,668 households. The following census in 2011 counted 140,275 people in 35,020 households. The 2016 census measured the population of the county as 137,534 in 38,503 households.

=== Administrative divisions ===
Aligudarz County's population history and administrative structure over three consecutive censuses are shown in the following table.

Aligudarz County Population
Administrative Divisions	2006	2011	2016
Central District	113,455	119,320	99,653
Borborud-e Gharbi RD	11,171	10,131	
Borborud-e Sharqi RD	9,539	8,715	
Farsesh RD	3,132	2,258	
Khomeh RD	4,445	4,084	3,759
Pachehlak-e Sharqi RD	6,478	6,165	6,626
Aligudarz (city)	78,690	87,967	89,268
Borborud-e Gharbi District			9,335
Borborud-e Gharbi RD			6,029
Cheshmeh Par RD			3,306
Shahpurabad (city) (Note: Became a city after the 2016 census)			
Borborud-e Sharqi District			10,427
Borborud-e Sharqi RD			8,467
Farsesh RD			1,960
Chaman Soltan (city)			
Zalaqi District (Note: Formerly Besharat District)	9,907	9,703	8,346
Pishkuh-e Zalaqi RD	3,388	2,851	2,676
Zalaqi-ye Gharbi RD	3,252	3,013	2,807
Zalaqi-ye Sharqi RD	3,267	3,839	2,863
Titkan (city) (Note: Became a city after the 2016 census)			
Zaz and Mahru District	11,440	11,188	9,584
Mahru RD	2,023	2,057	1,814
Zaz-e Gharbi RD	2,248	1,944	1,335
Zaz-e Sharqi RD (Note: Formerly Zaz Rural District)	7,169	5,634	4,904
Shulabad (city) (Note: Formerly Shulabad-e Sofla)		1,553	1,531
Total	134,802	140,275	137,534
RD = Rural District

== Gallery ==
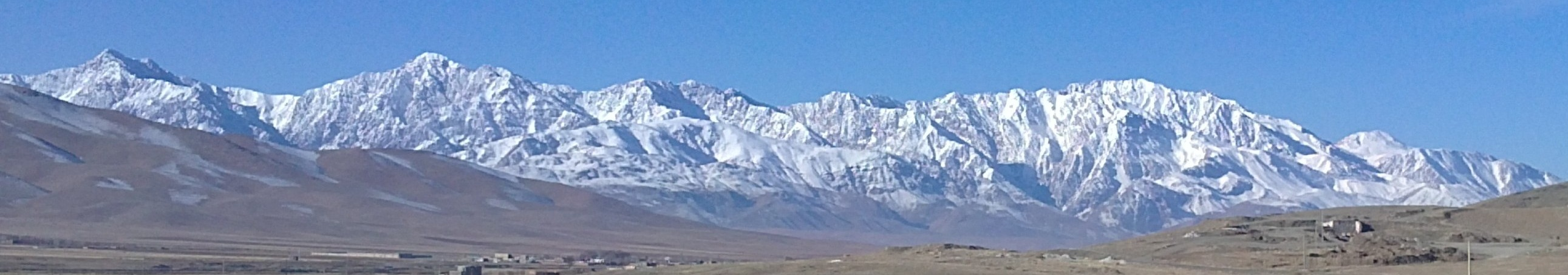
Mount Oshtoran (Kuh-e Oshtoran)

== See also ==
Media related to Aligudarz County at Wikimedia Commons
