= Central District (Aligudarz County) =

District in Lorestan province, Iran

Central District (Aligudarz County) Persian: بخش مرکزی شهرستان الیگودرز
- District
- Location within Iran
- Coordinates: 33°22′N 49°39′E
- Country: Iran
- Province: Lorestan
- County: Aligudarz
- Capital: Aligudarz

Population (2016)
  - Total: 99,653
- Time zone: UTC+3:30 (IRST)

The Central District of Aligudarz County (Persian: بخش مرکزی شهرستان الیگودرز) is in Lorestan province, Iran. Its capital is the city of Aligudarz.

== History ==
After the 2011 National Census, Borborud-e Gharbi Rural District was separated from the district in the formation of Borborud-e Gharbi District. At the same time, Borborud-e Sharqi Rural District and Farsesh Rural District were also separated from the Central District to form Borborud-e Sharqi District.

== Demographics ==
=== Population ===
At the time of the 2006 census, the Central District's population was 113,455 in 25,013 households. The following census in 2011 counted 119,320 people in 31,013 households. The 2016 census measured the population of the district as 99,653 inhabitants in 28,513 households.

=== Administrative divisions ===
Central District (Aligudarz County) Population
Administrative Divisions	2006	2011	2016
Borborud-e Gharbi RD (Note: Transferred to Borborud-e Gharbi District)	11,171	10,131	
Borborud-e Sharqi RD (Note: Transferred to Borborud-e Sharqi District)	9,539	8,715	
Farsesh RD	3,132	2,258	
Khomeh RD	4,445	4,084	3,759
Pachehlak-e Sharqi RD	6,478	6,165	6,626
Aligudarz (city)	78,690	87,967	89,268
Total	113,455	119,320	99,653
RD = Rural District
