= Sar Qaleh =

Sar Qaleh or Sar Ghaleh (Persian: سر قلعه) may refer to:

== Chaharmahal and Bakhtiari Province ==
- Sar Qaleh, Ardal, a village in Ardal County
- Sar Qaleh, Lordegan, a village in Lordegan County
- Sar Qaleh, Manj, a village in Lordegan County

== Kermanshah Province ==
- Sarqaleh Rural District, an administrative subdivision

== Khuzestan Province ==
- Sar Qaleh, Khuzestan, a village in Khuzestan Province
- Sar Qaleh Palmi, a village in Khuzestan Province
- Sar Qaleh-ye Ha, a village in Khuzestan Province
- Sar Qaleh-ye Khalijan, a village in Khuzestan Province
- Sar Qaleh Zivar, a village in Khuzestan Province

== Kurdistan Province ==
- Sar Qaleh, Kurdistan, a village in Divandarreh County

== Lorestan Province ==
- Sar Qaleh, Zaz-e Gharbi, a village in Lorestan Province
- Sar Qaleh, Zaz-e Sharqi, a village in Lorestan Province
- Sar Qaleh Sofla, a village in Lorestan Province
