= Bisheh =

Bisheh (Persian: بيشه) may refer to:

- Bisheh, Hormozgan
- Bisheh, Khuzestan
- Bisheh-e Sorkh, Khuzestan Province
- Bisheh Bozan, Khuzestan Province
- Bisheh Dulang, Khuzestan Province
- Bisheh, Kohgiluyeh and Boyer-Ahmad
- Bisheh, Lorestan
- Bisheh, Khusf, South Khorasan Province
- Bisheh, Nehbandan, South Khorasan Province
- Bisheh, Sarbisheh, South Khorasan Province
- Bisheh, Yazd

== See also ==
- Bisheh Khazan
