= Ab Garmak =

Ab Garmak or Abgarmak (Persian: ابگرمك or اب گرمك), also rendered as Ab Garmag, may refer to:

== Bushehr province ==
- Abgarmak, Bushehr, a village in Jam County

== Isfahan province ==
- Ab Garmak, Isfahan, a village in Semirom County

== Khuzestan province ==
- Abgarmak, Andika, a village in Andika County
- Ab Garmak, Bagh-e Malek, a village in Bagh-e Malek County
- Ab Garmak-e Olya, a village in Shushtar County
- Ab Garmak-e Sofla, Khuzestan, a village in Shushtar County

== Kohgiluyeh and Boyer-Ahmad province ==
- Ab Garmak-e Guznan, a village in Boyer-Ahmad County
- Ab Garmak-e Olya-ye Neqareh Khaneh, a village in Dana County

== Lorestan province ==
- Ab Garmag, Aligudarz, a village in Aligudarz County
- Abgarmak-e Olya, Besharat, a village in Besharat District, Aligudarz County
- Abgarmak-e Olya, Zaz and Mahru, a village in Zaz and Mahru District, Aligudarz County
- Abgarmak-e Sofla, Besharat, a village in Besharat District, Aligudarz County
