= Horrabad =

Horrabad or Horabad (Persian: حراباد) may refer to:

- Horrabad-e Olya, Lorestan Province
- Horrabad-e Sofla, Lorestan Province
- Horrabad, Markazi
- Horrabad, Mazandaran
