= Abgarmak-e Sofla =

Abgarmak-e Sofla (Persian: اب گرمك سفلي) or Abgarmak-e Pain (Persian: آبگرمک پائین), both meaning "Lower Abgarmak", may refer to:

- Ab Garmak-e Pain, Khuzestan, a village in Bagh-e Malek County, Khuzestan Province, Iran
- Ab Garmak-e Sofla, Khuzestan, a village in Shushtar County, Khuzestan Province, Iran
- Abgarmak-e Sofla, Besharat, a village in Besharat District, Aligudarz County, Lorestan Province, Iran
