= Ordowt =

Ordowt (Persian: اردوت) may refer to:

- Ordowt-e Darvish
- Ordowt-e Kal
- Ordowt-e Nazer
