= Darreh Lir =

Darreh Lir (Persian: دره لير) may refer to:

- Darreh Lir, Kohgiluyeh and Boyer-Ahmad
- Darreh Lir, Khuzestan
- Darreh Lir, Lorestan
