= Zalaqi =

Zalaqi may refer to various rural districts in Iran:

- Pishkuh-e Zalaqi Rural District
- Zalaqi-ye Gharbi Rural District
- Zalaqi-ye Sharqi Rural District
