= Abgarmak-e Olya =

Abgarmak-e Olya may refer to:

- Abgarmak-e Olya, Besharat, a village in Besharat District, Aligudarz County, Lorestan Province, Iran
- Abgarmak-e Olya, Zaz and Mahru, a village in Zaz and Mahru District, Aligudarz County, Lorestan Province, Iran
