= Lakurgan =

Lakurgan لاكورگان
- Village
- Location within Iran
- Coordinates: 32°01′16″N 49°55′54″E
- Country: Iran
- Province: Khuzestan
- County: Izeh
- Bakhsh: Susan
- Rural District: Susan-e Sharqi

Population (2006)
  - Total: 37
- Time zone: UTC+3:30 (IRST)
  - Summer (DST): UTC+4:30 (IRDT)

Lakurgan (Persian: لاكورگان, also Romanized as Lākūrgān; also known as Lākūrgān Va Nokhvodkār) is a village in Susan-e Sharqi Rural District, Susan District, Izeh County, Khuzestan Province, Iran. At the 2006 census, its population was 37, in 6 families.
