= Darreh Chah =

Darreh Chah (Persian: دره چاه) may refer to:

- Darreh Chah, Jam, Bushehr Province
- Darreh Chah, Kohgiluyeh and Boyer-Ahmad
- Darreh Chah, Lorestan
