= Deh Darbeh =

Deh Darbeh ده دربه
- Village
- Location within Iran
- Coordinates: 31°57′34″N 50°03′00″E
- Country: Iran
- Province: Khuzestan
- County: Izeh
- Bakhsh: Susan
- Rural District: Susan-e Sharqi

Population (2006)
  - Total: 45
- Time zone: UTC+3:30 (IRST)
  - Summer (DST): UTC+4:30 (IRDT)

Deh Darbeh (Persian: ده دربه) is a village in Susan-e Sharqi Rural District, Susan District, Izeh County, Khuzestan Province, Iran. At the 2006 census, its population was 45, in 9 families.
