= Barreh Deh =

Barreh Deh (Persian: بره ده) may refer to:

- Barreh Deh, East Azerbaijan
- Barreh Deh, Khuzestan
