= Qaryeh-ye Teymur =

Qaryeh-ye Teymur قريه تيمور
- Village
- Location within Iran
- Coordinates: 31°57′47″N 50°01′52″E
- Country: Iran
- Province: Khuzestan
- County: Izeh
- Bakhsh: Susan
- Rural District: Susan-e Sharqi

Population (2006)
  - Total: 209
- Time zone: UTC+3:30 (IRST)
  - Summer (DST): UTC+4:30 (IRDT)

Qaryeh-ye Teymur (Persian: قريه تيمور, also Romanized as Qaryeh-ye Teymūr) is a village in Susan-e Sharqi Rural District, Susan District, Izeh County, Khuzestan Province, Iran. At the 2006 census, its population was 209, in 41 families.
