= Darreh Chi =

Darreh Chi (Persian: دره چي) may refer to:

- Darreh Chi, Kohgiluyeh and Boyer-Ahmad
- Darreh Chi, Lorestan
