= Pez (disambiguation) =

Pez is a brand of candy.

Pez, the Spanish word for fish, may also refer to:

- Pez, an identifier of human gene PTPN14
- Pez-e Olya ("Upper Pez"), a village in Iran
- Pez-e Sofla ("Lower Pez"), a village in Iran
- Pez-e Vosta ("Middle Pez"), a village in Iran
- Barbadillo del Pez, a municipality located in the province of Burgos, Castile y León, Spain
- Château de Pez, a Bordeaux wine estate
- Château Les Ormes-de-Pez, a Bordeaux wine estate
- Penza Airport (IATA: PEZ)
- Pez Card Game
- Pezcore and The Pez Collection, albums by US Ska punk group Less Than Jake

People:

- Pez (musician), Australian hip hop artist
- Andrés de Pez (1657 - 1723), Spanish Naval commander and founder of Pensacola, Florida
- Bernhard Pez ( 1683 - 1735), Austrian Benedictine historian and librarian
- Hieronymus Pez (1685 - 1762), Austrian Benedictine historian and librarian
- Johann Christoph Pez (1664-1716), German composer
- Ramiro Pez, Argentine-Italian rugby union footballer
- PE'Z, Japanese jazz band.
- Pezz, the original name of Canadian pop-punk band Billy Talent.

Other:

- "Hombre pez" or Fish-man of Lierganes, from the mythology of Cantabria, Spain
- El Pez que Fuma, a 1977 Venezuelan film
- "The Pez Dispenser", an episode of the comedy TV series Seinfeld
- .pez, the computer filename extension for Prezi files
- The Protocols of the Elders of Zion, a fabricated antisemitic text
