= Dast Kortan =

Dast Kortan دست كرتان
- Village
- Location within Iran
- Coordinates: 32°01′51″N 49°48′30″E
- Country: Iran
- Province: Khuzestan
- County: Izeh
- Bakhsh: Susan
- Rural District: Susan-e Gharbi

Population (2006)
  - Total: 112
- Time zone: UTC+3:30 (IRST)
  - Summer (DST): UTC+4:30 (IRDT)

Dast Kortan (Persian: دست كرتان, also Romanized as Dast Kortān) is a village in Susan-e Gharbi Rural District, Susan District, Izeh County, Khuzestan Province, Iran. At the 2006 census, its population was 112, in 18 families.
