= Dar Kul =

Dar Kul (Persian: دركول) may refer to:

- Dar Kul, Aligudarz
- Dar Kul, Khorramabad
