= Sar Anbar =

Sar Anbar سرانبار
- Village
- Location within Iran
- Coordinates: 32°01′52″N 49°47′20″E
- Country: Iran
- Province: Khuzestan
- County: Izeh
- Bakhsh: Susan
- Rural District: Susan-e Gharbi

Population (2006)
  - Total: 54
- Time zone: UTC+3:30 (IRST)
  - Summer (DST): UTC+4:30 (IRDT)

Sar Anbar (Persian: سرانبار, also Romanized as Sar Anbār; also known as Sar Anbār-e Kāshgelī) is a village in Susan-e Gharbi Rural District, Susan District, Izeh County, Khuzestan Province, Iran. At the 2006 census, its population was 54, in 7 families.
