= Galleh Gah, Lorestan =

Village in Lorestan province, Iran

Galleh Gah Persian: گله گه
- Village
- Country: Iran
- Province: Lorestan
- County: Aligudarz
- District: Zalaqi
- Rural District: Zalaqi-ye Gharbi

Population (2016)
  - Total: Below reporting threshold
- Time zone: UTC+3:30 (IRST)

Galleh Gah (Persian: گله گه) is a village in Zalaqi-ye Gharbi Rural District of Zalaqi District (Note: Formerly Besharat District) in Aligudarz County, Lorestan province, Iran.

== Demographics ==
=== Population ===
At the time of the 2006 National Census, the village's population was 28 in four households. The following census in 2011 counted 33 people in six households. The 2016 census measured the population of the village as below the reporting threshold.
