= Tut-e Rudab =

Village in Lorestan province, Iran

Tut-e Rudab Persian: توت روداب
- Village
- Country: Iran
- Province: Lorestan
- County: Aligudarz
- District: Zalaqi
- Rural District: Zalaqi-ye Sharqi

Population (2016)
  - Total: 23
- Time zone: UTC+3:30 (IRST)

Tut-e Rudab (Persian: توت روداب) (Note: Also romanized as Tūt-e Rūdāb) is a village in Zalaqi-ye Sharqi Rural District of Zalaqi District (Note: Formerly Besharat District) in Aligudarz County, Lorestan province, Iran.

== Demographics ==
=== Population ===
At the time of the 2006 National Census, the village's population was 28 in five households. The following census in 2011 counted 27 people in five households. The 2016 census measured the population of the village as 23 people in six households.
