= Suzar =

Village in Lorestan province, Iran

Suzar Persian: سوزر
- Village
- Location within Iran
- Coordinates: 32°54′47″N 49°23′00″E
- Country: Iran
- Province: Lorestan
- County: Aligudarz
- District: Zalaqi
- Rural District: Zalaqi-ye Gharbi

Population (2016)
  - Total: 78
- Time zone: UTC+3:30 (IRST)

Suzar (Persian: سوزر) (Note: Also romanized as Sūzar) is a village in Zalaqi-ye Gharbi Rural District of Zalaqi District (Note: Formerly Besharat District) in Aligudarz County, Lorestan province, Iran.

== Demographics ==
=== Population ===
At the time of the 2006 National Census, the village's population was 165 in 29 households. The following census in 2011 counted 171 people in 38 households. The 2016 census measured the population of the village as 78 people in 20 households.
