= Ahmad Hasan =

Village in Lorestan province, Iran

Ahmad Hasan Persian: احمدحسن
- Village
- Location within Iran
- Country: Iran
- Province: Lorestan
- County: Aligudarz
- District: Zalaqi
- Rural District: Zalaqi-ye Gharbi

Population (2016)
  - Total: Below reporting threshold
- Time zone: UTC+3:30 (IRST)

Ahmad Hasan (Persian: احمدحسن) (Note: Also romanized as Aḩmad Ḩasan and Āḥmadḥasan; also known as Kūl-e Aḩmad Ḩasan) is a village in Zalaqi-ye Gharbi Rural District of Zalaqi District (Note: Formerly Besharat District) in Aligudarz County, Lorestan province, Iran.

== Demographics ==
=== Population ===
At the time of the 2006 National Census, the village's population was 26 in four households. The following census in 2011 counted 26 people in five households. The 2016 census measured the population of the village as below the reporting threshold.
