= Darreh Tarik =

Village in Lorestan province, Iran

Darreh Tarik Persian: دره تاریک
- Village
- Location within Iran
- Country: Iran
- Province: Lorestan
- County: Aligudarz
- District: Zalaqi
- Rural District: Zalaqi-ye Sharqi

Population (2016)
  - Total: 21
- Time zone: UTC+3:30 (IRST)

Darreh Tarik (Persian: دره تاربک) (Note: Also romanized as Darreh Tārīk) is a village in Zalaqi-ye Sharqi Rural District of Zalaqi District (Note: Formerly Besharat District) in Aligudarz County, Lorestan province, Iran.

== Demographics ==
=== Population ===
At the time of the 2006 National Census, the village's population was 26 in four households. The following census in 2011 counted 29 people in six households. The 2016 census measured the population of the village as 21 people in seven households.
