= Barreh Deh, Khuzestan =

Barreh Deh بره ده
- Village
- Location within Iran
- Coordinates: 31°53′59″N 50°03′54″E
- Country: Iran
- Province: Khuzestan
- County: Izeh
- Bakhsh: Susan
- Rural District: Susan-e Sharqi

Population (2006)
  - Total: 63
- Time zone: UTC+3:30 (IRST)
  - Summer (DST): UTC+4:30 (IRDT)

Barreh Deh (Persian: بره ده) is a village in Susan-e Sharqi Rural District, Susan District, Izeh County, Khuzestan Province, Iran. At the 2006 census, its population was 63, in 11 families.
