= Pakhimeh Gah =

Village in Lorestan province, Iran

Pakhimeh Gah Persian: پاخيمه گاه
- Village
- Country: Iran
- Province: Lorestan
- County: Aligudarz
- District: Zalaqi
- Rural District: Zalaqi-ye Sharqi

Population (2016)
  - Total: 237
- Time zone: UTC+3:30 (IRST)

Pakhimeh Gah (Persian: پاخيمه گاه) (Note: Also romanized as Pākhīmeh Gāh) is a village in Zalaqi-ye Sharqi Rural District of Zalaqi District (Note: Formerly Besharat District) in Aligudarz County, Lorestan province, Iran.

== Demographics ==
=== Population ===
At the time of the 2006 National Census, the village's population was 230 in 42 households. The following census in 2011 counted 195 people in 38 households. The 2016 census measured the population of the village as 237 people in 56 households.
