= Chelan, Lorestan =

Village in Lorestan province, Iran

Chelan Persian: چلان
- Village
- Location within Iran
- Country: Iran
- Province: Lorestan
- County: Aligudarz
- District: Zalaqi
- Rural District: Zalaqi-ye Gharbi

Population (2016)
  - Total: 67
- Time zone: UTC+3:30 (IRST)

Chelan (Persian: چلان) (Note: Also romanized as Chelān; also known as Chālān) is a village in Zalaqi-ye Gharbi Rural District of Zalaqi District (Note: Formerly Besharat District) in Aligudarz County, Lorestan province, Iran.

== Demographics ==
=== Population ===
At the time of the 2006 National Census, the village's population was 87 in 16 households. The following census in 2011 counted 80 people in 16 households. The 2016 census measured the population of the village as 67 people in 18 households.
