= Sharvand =

Village in Lorestan province, Iran

Sharvand Persian: شاروند
- Village
- Location within Iran
- Country: Iran
- Province: Lorestan
- County: Aligudarz
- District: Zalaqi
- Rural District: Zalaqi-ye Sharqi

Population (2016)
  - Total: 22
- Time zone: UTC+3:30 (IRST)

Sharvand (Persian: شاروند) (Note: Also romanized as Shārvand; also known as Sharband) is a village in Zalaqi-ye Sharqi Rural District of Zalaqi District (Note: Formerly Besharat District) in Aligudarz County, Lorestan province, Iran.

== Demographics ==
=== Population ===
At the time of the 2006 National Census, the village's population was 48 in nine households. The following census in 2011 counted 23 people in five households. The 2016 census measured the population of the village as 22 people in five households.
