= Marreh =

Village in Lorestan province, Iran

Marreh Persian: مره
- Village
- Country: Iran
- Province: Lorestan
- County: Aligudarz
- District: Zalaqi
- Rural District: Zalaqi-ye Sharqi

Population (2016)
  - Total: 67
- Time zone: UTC+3:30 (IRST)

Marreh (Persian: مره) is a village in Zalaqi-ye Sharqi Rural District of Zalaqi District (Note: Formerly Besharat District) in Aligudarz County, Lorestan province, Iran.

== Demographics ==
=== Population ===
At the time of the 2006 National Census, the village's population was 117 in 25 households. The following census in 2011 counted 102 people in 21 households. The 2016 census measured the population of the village as 67 people in 20 households.
