= Ilard =

Village in Lorestan province, Iran

Ilard Persian: ايلرد
- Village
- Location within Iran
- Country: Iran
- Province: Lorestan
- County: Aligudarz
- District: Zalaqi
- Rural District: Zalaqi-ye Gharbi

Population (2016)
  - Total: 108
- Time zone: UTC+3:30 (IRST)

Ilard (Persian: ايلرد) (Note: Also romanized as Īlard) is a village in Zalaqi-ye Gharbi Rural District of Zalaqi District (Note: Formerly Besharat District) in Aligudarz County, Lorestan province, Iran.

== Demographics ==
=== Population ===
At the time of the 2006 National Census, the village's population was 86 in 15 households. The following census in 2011 counted 75 people in 13 households. The 2016 census measured the population of the village as 108 people in 22 households.
