= Ni Badar =

Village in Lorestan province, Iran

Ni Badar Persian: ني بدر
- Village
- Country: Iran
- Province: Lorestan
- County: Aligudarz
- District: Zalaqi
- Rural District: Zalaqi-ye Gharbi

Population (2016)
  - Total: 20
- Time zone: UTC+3:30 (IRST)

Ni Badar (Persian: ني بدر) (Note: Also romanized as Nī Badar) is a village in Zalaqi-ye Gharbi Rural District of Zalaqi District (Note: Formerly Besharat District) in Aligudarz County, Lorestan province, Iran.

== Demographics ==
=== Population ===
At the time of the 2006 National Census, the village's population was 46 in eight households. The following census in 2011 counted 73 people in 13 households. The 2016 census measured the population of the village as 20 people in four households.
