= Kagelestan-e Bar Aftab =

Village in Lorestan province, Iran

Kagelestan-e Bar Aftab Persian: كاگلستان برافتاب
- Village
- Location within Iran
- Coordinates: 33°01′49″N 49°39′26″E
- Country: Iran
- Province: Lorestan
- County: Aligudarz
- District: Zalaqi
- Rural District: Pishkuh-e Zalaqi

Population (2016)
  - Total: 47
- Time zone: UTC+3:30 (IRST)

Kagelestan-e Bar Aftab (Persian: كاگلستان برافتاب) (Note: Also romanized as Kāgelestān-e Bar Āftāb; also known as Kakolstan-e Baraftab) is a village in Pishkuh-e Zalaqi Rural District of Zalaqi District (Note: Formerly Besharat District) in Aligudarz County, Lorestan province, Iran.

== Demographics ==
=== Population ===
At the time of the 2006 National Census, the village's population was 43 in seven households. The following census in 2011 counted 36 people in eight households. The 2016 census measured the population of the village as 47 people in 15 households.
