= Deh Shahi =

Village in Lorestan province, Iran

Deh Shahi Persian: ده شاهي
- Village
- Location within Iran
- Coordinates: 32°53′17″N 49°39′14″E
- Country: Iran
- Province: Lorestan
- County: Aligudarz
- District: Zalaqi
- Rural District: Zalaqi-ye Sharqi

Population (2016)
  - Total: Below reporting threshold
- Time zone: UTC+3:30 (IRST)

Deh Shahi (Persian: ده شاهي) (Note: Also romanized as Deh Shāhī) is a village in Zalaqi-ye Sharqi Rural District of Zalaqi District (Note: Formerly Besharat District) in Aligudarz County, Lorestan province, Iran.

== Demographics ==
=== Population ===
At the time of the 2006 National Census, the village's population was 115 in 23 households. The 2016 census measured the population of the village as below the reporting threshold.
