= Mombin =

Mombin may refer to:

- Mombin, Iran, a village in Khuzestan Province, Iran
- Spondias purpurea — Red mombin or purple mombin, a fruit tree native to tropical America
- Spondias mombin — Yellow mombin, a fruit tree native to Brazil and Costa Rica
