= Bagh-e Latifan =

Village in Lorestan province, Iran

Bagh-e Latifan Persian: باغ لطفيان
- Village
- Location within Iran
- Coordinates: 33°04′49″N 49°36′14″E
- Country: Iran
- Province: Lorestan
- County: Aligudarz
- District: Zalaqi
- Rural District: Pishkuh-e Zalaqi

Population (2016)
  - Total: 257
- Time zone: UTC+3:30 (IRST)

Bagh-e Latifan (Persian: باغ لطفيان) (Note: Also romanized as Bāgh-e Laţīfān and Bāgh-e Loţfīān; also known as Bagh (باغ), also romanized as Bāgh) is a village in Pishkuh-e Zalaqi Rural District of Zalaqi District (Note: Formerly Besharat District) in Aligudarz County, Lorestan province, Iran.

== Demographics ==
=== Population ===
At the time of the 2006 National Census, the village's population was 370 in 65 households. The following census in 2011 counted 331 people in 57 households. The 2016 census measured the population of the village as 257 people in 66 households.
