= Sar Qaleh Palmi =

Sar Qaleh Palmi سرقلعه پلمي
- Village
- Country: Iran
- Province: Khuzestan
- County: Izeh
- Bakhsh: Susan
- Rural District: Susan-e Gharbi

Population (2006)
  - Total: 159
- Time zone: UTC+3:30 (IRST)
  - Summer (DST): UTC+4:30 (IRDT)

Sar Qaleh Palmi (Persian: سرقلعه پلمي, also Romanized as Sar Qal‘eh Palmī) is a village in Susan-e Gharbi Rural District, Susan District, Izeh County, Khuzestan Province, Iran. At the 2006 census, its population was 159 people from 24 families.
