= Galeh Bardar, Lorestan =

Village in Lorestan province, Iran

Galeh Bardar Persian: گله بردر
- Village
- Location within Iran
- Coordinates: 33°04′08″N 49°34′34″E
- Country: Iran
- Province: Lorestan
- County: Aligudarz
- District: Zalaqi
- Rural District: Pishkuh-e Zalaqi

Population (2016)
  - Total: Below reporting threshold
- Time zone: UTC+3:30 (IRST)

Galeh Bardar (Persian: گله بردر) is a village in Pishkuh-e Zalaqi Rural District of Zalaqi District (Note: Formerly Besharat District) in Aligudarz County, Lorestan province, Iran.

== Demographics ==
=== Population ===
At the time of the 2006 National Census, the village's population was 30 in five households. The following censuses in 2011 and 2016 counted a population below the reporting threshold.
