= Dandak =

Dandak may refer to:

- Dandak, a kingdom in Hindu mythology; see Dandaka
- Dandak, alternate name of Davudak, a village in Iran
- Dandak cave, in Kanger Ghati National Park

== See also ==
- Dandakaranya, central Indian forest featured in Hindu literature
- Dandakaranya Project, settlement project in India
- Dandakaranyam, 2016 Indian film
