= Seyyedhasan, Lorestan =

Village in Lorestan province, Iran

Seyyedhasan Persian: سيدحسن
- Village
- Location within Iran
- Coordinates: 32°56′42″N 49°32′28″E
- Country: Iran
- Province: Lorestan
- County: Aligudarz
- District: Zalaqi
- Rural District: Zalaqi-ye Gharbi

Population (2016)
  - Total: 37
- Time zone: UTC+3:30 (IRST)

Seyyedhasan (Persian: سيدحسن) is a village in Zalaqi-ye Gharbi Rural District of Zalaqi District (Note: Formerly Besharat District) in Aligudarz County, Lorestan province, Iran.

== Demographics ==
=== Population ===
At the time of the 2006 National Census, the village's population was 27 in five households. The following census in 2011 counted 25 people in four households. The 2016 census measured the population of the village as 37 people in eight households.
