= Polchi =

Village in Lorestan province, Iran

Polchi Persian: پل چي
- Village
- Location within Iran
- Country: Iran
- Province: Lorestan
- County: Aligudarz
- District: Zalaqi
- Rural District: Zalaqi-ye Gharbi

Population (2016)
  - Total: 21
- Time zone: UTC+3:30 (IRST)

Polchi (Persian: پل چي) (Note: Also romanized as Pol Chī) is a village in Zalaqi-ye Gharbi Rural District of Zalaqi District (Note: Formerly Besharat District) in Aligudarz County, Lorestan province, Iran.

== Demographics ==
=== Population ===
At the time of the 2006 National Census, the village's population was 66 in 11 households. The following census in 2011 counted 44 people in 10 households. The 2016 census measured the population of the village as 21 people in four households.
