= Malek Alus =

Village in Lorestan province, Iran

Malek Alus Persian: ملك الوس
- Village
- Location within Iran
- Coordinates: 33°02′16″N 49°36′21″E
- Country: Iran
- Province: Lorestan
- County: Aligudarz
- District: Zalaqi
- Rural District: Pishkuh-e Zalaqi

Population (2016)
  - Total: Below reporting threshold
- Time zone: UTC+3:30 (IRST)

Malek Alus (Persian: ملك الوس) (Note: Also romanized as Malek Alūs; also known as Alows and Alūs) is a village in Pishkuh-e Zalaqi Rural District of Zalaqi District (Note: Formerly Besharat District) in Aligudarz County, Lorestan province, Iran.

== Demographics ==
=== Population ===
At the time of the 2006 National Census, the village's population was 24 in four households. The following census in 2011 counted 26 people in six households. The 2016 census measured the population of the village as below the reporting threshold.
