= Jirga (disambiguation) =

A jirga is an assembly or council of Pashtun and Afghan leaders that makes decisions by consensus.

Jirga may also refer to:

== Politics ==
- Meshrano Jirga ("Elders' Jirga"), the upper house of the Afghan legislature
- Wolesi Jirga, ("People's Jirga"), the lower house of the Afghan legislature
- Pashtun National Jirga, held to discuss the critical issues faced by the Pashtuns in Pakistan
- All India Pakhtoon Jirga-e-Hind, organisation representing the interests of Pashtuns in India

== Film and television ==
- Jirga (film), 2018 Australian film
- Jirga with Saleem Safi, current affairs talk show on Geo News

== See also ==
- Jirgah, village in Lorestan Province, Iran
