= Charaki, Iran =

Village in Lorestan province, Iran

Charaki Persian: چاركي
- Village
- Location within Iran
- Coordinates: 32°47′54″N 49°35′35″E
- Country: Iran
- Province: Lorestan
- County: Aligudarz
- District: Zalaqi
- Rural District: Zalaqi-ye Sharqi

Population (2016)
  - Total: 46
- Time zone: UTC+3:30 (IRST)

Charaki (Persian: چاركي) (Note: Also romanized as Chāraḵī) is a village in Zalaqi-ye Sharqi Rural District of Zalaqi District (Note: Formerly Besharat District) in Aligudarz County, Lorestan province, Iran.

== Demographics ==
=== Population ===
At the time of the 2006 National Census, the village's population was 59 in 10 households. The following census in 2011 counted 58 people in 12 households. The 2016 census measured the population of the village as 46 people in eight households.
