= Chaleh Pareh =

Village in Lorestan province, Iran

Chaleh Pareh Persian: چاله پره
- Village
- Location within Iran
- Coordinates: 32°53′07″N 49°38′24″E
- Country: Iran
- Province: Lorestan
- County: Aligudarz
- District: Zalaqi
- Rural District: Zalaqi-ye Sharqi

Population (2016)
  - Total: 424
- Time zone: UTC+3:30 (IRST)

Chaleh Pareh (Persian: چاله پره) (Note: Also romanized as Chāleh Pareh; also known as Chal Pareh) is a village in, and the capital of, Zalaqi-ye Sharqi Rural District in Zalaqi District (Note: Formerly Besharat District) of Aligudarz County, Lorestan province, Iran. The previous capital of the rural district was the village of Kish Olya. (Note: Also known as Kish Beznavid)

== Demographics ==
=== Population ===
At the time of the 2006 National Census, the village's population was 306 in 53 households. The following census in 2011 counted 420 people in 88 households. The 2016 census measured the population of the village as 424 people in 94 households, the most populous in its rural district.
