= Cheqa Vaqfi =

Village in Lorestan province, Iran

Cheqa Vaqfi Persian: چقاوقفي
- Village
- Location within Iran
- Coordinates: 33°02′25″N 49°35′39″E
- Country: Iran
- Province: Lorestan
- County: Aligudarz
- District: Zalaqi
- Rural District: Pishkuh-e Zalaqi

Population (2016)
  - Total: 47
- Time zone: UTC+3:30 (IRST)

Cheqa Vaqfi (Persian: چقاوقفي) (Note: Also romanized as Cheqā Vaqfī) is a village in Pishkuh-e Zalaqi Rural District of Zalaqi District (Note: Formerly Besharat District) in Aligudarz County, Lorestan province, Iran.

== Demographics ==
=== Population ===
At the time of the 2006 National Census, the village's population was 58 in 10 households. The following census in 2011 counted 60 people in 14 households. The 2016 census measured the population of the village as 47 people in 12 households.
