= Sokaneh, Lorestan =

Village in Lorestan province, Iran

Sokaneh Persian: سكانه
- Village
- Location within Iran
- Coordinates: 33°05′11″N 49°37′13″E
- Country: Iran
- Province: Lorestan
- County: Aligudarz
- District: Zalaqi
- Rural District: Pishkuh-e Zalaqi

Population (2016)
  - Total: 25
- Time zone: UTC+3:30 (IRST)

Sokaneh (Persian: سكانه) (Note: Also romanized as Sokāneh and Sokkaneh; also known as Seh Kūneh, Sekūneh, Sih Kūneh, and Sokūneh) is a village in Pishkuh-e Zalaqi Rural District of Zalaqi District (Note: Formerly Besharat District) in Aligudarz County, Lorestan province, Iran.

== Demographics ==
=== Population ===
At the time of the 2006 National Census, the village's population was 58 in 10 households. The following census in 2011 counted 45 people in 10 households. The 2016 census measured the population of the village as 25 people in eight households.
