= Rezgah, Lorestan =

Village in Lorestan province, Iran

Rezgah Persian: رزگه
- Village
- Location within Iran
- Coordinates: 32°55′38″N 49°31′36″E
- Country: Iran
- Province: Lorestan
- County: Aligudarz
- District: Zalaqi
- Rural District: Zalaqi-ye Gharbi

Population (2016)
  - Total: Below reporting threshold
- Time zone: UTC+3:30 (IRST)

Rezgah (Persian: رزگه) is a village in Zalaqi-ye Gharbi Rural District of Zalaqi District (Note: Formerly Besharat District) in Aligudarz County, Lorestan province, Iran.

== Demographics ==
=== Population ===
At the time of the 2006 National Census, the village's population was 45 in eight households. The following census in 2011 counted 37 people in seven households. The 2016 census measured the population of the village as below the reporting threshold.
