= Mesgari =

Village in Lorestan province, Iran

Mesgari Persian: مسگری
- Village
- Location within Iran
- Coordinates: 33°07′10″N 49°39′43″E
- Country: Iran
- Province: Lorestan
- County: Aligudarz
- District: Zalaqi
- Rural District: Pishkuh-e Zalaqi

Population (2016)
  - Total: 81
- Time zone: UTC+3:30 (IRST)

Mesgari (Persian: مسگری) (Note: Also romanized as Mesgarī; also known as Hasgarī) is a village in Pishkuh-e Zalaqi Rural District of Zalaqi District (Note: Formerly Besharat District) in Aligudarz County, Lorestan province, Iran.

== Demographics ==
=== Population ===
At the time of the 2006 National Census, the village's population was 97 in 14 households. The following census in 2011 counted 97 people in 21 households. The 2016 census measured the population of the village as 81 people in 19 households.
