= Liruk =

Village in Lorestan province, Iran

Liruk Persian: ليروک
- Village
- Country: Iran
- Province: Lorestan
- County: Aligudarz
- District: Zalaqi
- Rural District: Zalaqi-ye Gharbi

Population (2016)
  - Total: 213
- Time zone: UTC+3:30 (IRST)

Liruk (Persian: ليروک) (Note: Also romanized as Līrūk) is a village in Zalaqi-ye Gharbi Rural District of Zalaqi District (Note: Formerly Besharat District) in Aligudarz County, Lorestan province, Iran.

== Demographics ==
=== Population ===
At the time of the 2006 National Census, the village's population was 213 in 34 households. The following census in 2011 counted 142 people in 25 households. The 2016 census measured the population of the village as 205 people in 48 households.
