= Irman =

Village in Lorestan province, Iran

Irman Persian: ايرمان
- Village
- Country: Iran
- Province: Lorestan
- County: Aligudarz
- District: Zalaqi
- Rural District: Zalaqi-ye Sharqi

Population (2016)
  - Total: 41
- Time zone: UTC+3:30 (IRST)

Irman (Persian: ايرمان) (Note: Also romanized as Āīrmān) is a village in Zalaqi-ye Sharqi Rural District of Zalaqi District (Note: Formerly Besharat District) in Aligudarz County, Lorestan province, Iran.

== Demographics ==
=== Population ===
At the time of the 2006 National Census, the village's population was 49 in nine households. The following census in 2011 counted 35 people in nine households. The 2016 census measured the population of the village as 41 people in 10 households.
