= Larm =

Larm may refer to:

- Lärm, Dutch band
- Larm, Susan, Khuzestan Province, Iran
