= Varak, Lorestan =

Village in Lorestan province, Iran

Varak Persian: وارک
- Village
- Location within Iran
- Country: Iran
- Province: Lorestan
- County: Aligudarz
- District: Zalaqi
- Rural District: Zalaqi-ye Sharqi

Population (2016)
  - Total: 52
- Time zone: UTC+3:30 (IRST)

Varak (Persian: وارک) (Note: Also romanized as Vārak) is a village in Zalaqi-ye Sharqi Rural District of Zalaqi District (Note: Formerly Besharat District) in Aligudarz County, Lorestan province, Iran.

== Demographics ==
=== Population ===
At the time of the 2006 National Census, the village's population was 45 in eight households. The following census in 2011 counted 28 people in seven households. The 2016 census measured the population of the village as 52 people in 14 households.
