= Tang Taf =

Village in Lorestan province, Iran

Tang Taf Persian: تنگ تاف
- Village
- Location within Iran
- Country: Iran
- Province: Lorestan
- County: Aligudarz
- District: Zalaqi
- Rural District: Zalaqi-ye Gharbi

Population (2016)
  - Total: Below reporting threshold
- Time zone: UTC+3:30 (IRST)

Tang Taf (Persian: تنگ تاف) (Note: Also romanized as Tang Tāf; also known as Tang Nāf) is a village in Zalaqi-ye Gharbi Rural District of Zalaqi District (Note: Formerly Besharat District) in Aligudarz County, Lorestan province, Iran.

== Demographics ==
=== Population ===
At the time of the 2006 National Census, the village's population was 68 in 11 households. The following census in 2011 counted 61 people in 15 households. The 2016 census measured the population of the village as below the reporting threshold.
