= Radez =

Village in Lorestan province, Iran

Radez Persian: رادز
- Village
- Location within Iran
- Country: Iran
- Province: Lorestan
- County: Aligudarz
- District: Zalaqi
- Rural District: Zalaqi-ye Gharbi

Population (2016)
  - Total: 31
- Time zone: UTC+3:30 (IRST)

Radez (Persian: رادز) (Note: Also romanized as Rādez) is a village in Zalaqi-ye Gharbi Rural District of Zalaqi District (Note: Formerly Besharat District) in Aligudarz County, Lorestan province, Iran.

== Demographics ==
=== Population ===
At the time of the 2006 National Census, the village's population was 41 in five households. The following census in 2011 counted 36 people in six households. The 2016 census measured the population of the village as 31 people in seven households.
