= Gerdab, Lorestan =

Village in Lorestan province, Iran

Gerdab Persian: گرداب
- Village
- Location within Iran
- Country: Iran
- Province: Lorestan
- County: Aligudarz
- District: Zalaqi
- Rural District: Zalaqi-ye Sharqi

Population (2016)
  - Total: Below reporting threshold
- Time zone: UTC+3:30 (IRST)

Gerdab (Persian: گرداب) (Note: Also romanized as Gerdāb) is a village in Zalaqi-ye Sharqi Rural District of Zalaqi District (Note: Formerly Besharat District) in Aligudarz County, Lorestan province, Iran.

== Demographics ==
=== Population ===
At the time of the 2006 National Census, the village's population was 51 in eight households. The following census in 2011 counted 44 people in nine households. The 2016 census measured the population of the village as below the reporting threshold.
