= Larem =

Larem may refer to:

- Laram, Iran; also spelled as "Larem"
- Andreas Larem (born 1964), German politician
- Renaissance, a French centrist political party formerly known as La République En Marche! and abbreviated to LaREM

== See also ==
- REM (disambiguation)
- LA (disambiguation)
