= Titkan =

City in Lorestan province, Iran

Titkan Persian: تيتكان
- City
- Location within Iran
- Coordinates: 32°53′51″N 49°38′33″E
- Country: Iran
- Province: Lorestan
- County: Aligudarz
- District: Zalaqi
- Established: 2021

Population (2016)
  - Total: 378
- Time zone: UTC+3:30 (IRST)

Titkan (Persian: تيتكان) (Note: Also romanized as Tītakan and Tītkan; also known as Tītak) is a city in, and the capital of, Zalaqi District (Note: Formerly Besharat District) in Aligudarz County, Lorestan province, Iran. The previous capital of the district was the village of Bazanvid (now known as Kish Olya).

== Demographics ==
=== Population ===
At the time of the 2006 National Census, Titkan's population was 255 in 45 households, when it was a village in Zalaqi-ye Sharqi Rural District. The following census in 2011 counted 431 people in 88 households. The 2016 census measured the population as 378 people in 95 households.

The village of Titkan was converted to a city in 2021.

== Namesake ==
The city's name is also associated with Iranian Goods Trade Development (Titkan Corporation), inspired by the name of Titkan. The company specializes in supplying and manufacturing parts for industrial, construction, and mining machinery. Additionally, the corporation holds a commercial license for import and export activities.
