= Dastgerd, Zalaqi =

Village in Lorestan province, Iran

Dastgerd Persian: دستگرد
- Village
- Location within Iran
- Coordinates: 33°09′28″N 49°19′24″E
- Country: Iran
- Province: Lorestan
- County: Aligudarz
- District: Zalaqi
- Rural District: Zalaqi-ye Sharqi

Population (2016)
  - Total: 335
- Time zone: UTC+3:30 (IRST)

Dastgerd (Persian: دستگرد) is a village in Zalaqi-ye Sharqi Rural District of Zalaqi District (Note: Formerly Besharat District) in Aligudarz County, Lorestan province, Iran.

== Demographics ==
=== Population ===
At the time of the 2006 National Census, the village's population was 253 in 46 households. The following census in 2011 counted 210 people in 43 households. The 2016 census measured the population of the village as 335 people in 70 households.
