= Juzir =

Juzir (Persian: جوزير) may refer to:

- Juzir, Hormozgan
- Juzir, Lorestan
