= Jangeh, Khuzestan =

Village in Khuzestan province, Iran

Jangeh Persian: جنگه
- Village
- Location within Iran
- Coordinates: 32°01′45″N 49°57′38″E
- Country: Iran
- Province: Khuzestan
- County: Izeh
- District: Susan
- Rural District: Susan-e Sharqi

Population (2016)
  - Total: 678
- Time zone: UTC+3:30 (IRST)

Jangeh (Persian: جنگه) (Note: Also romanized as Jang Gah) is a village in, and the capital of, Susan-e Sharqi Rural District of Susan District, Izeh County, Khuzestan province, Iran.

== Demographics ==
=== Population ===
At the time of the 2006 National Census, the village's population was 852 in 124 households, when it was in the Central District. The following census in 2011 counted 957 people in 167 households, by which time the rural district had been separated from the district in the formation of Susan District. The 2016 census measured the population of the village as 678 people in 107 households.
