= Chal Tella =

Village in Lorestan province, Iran

Chal Tella Persian: چال طلا
- Village
- Location within Iran
- Coordinates: 32°53′57″N 49°01′08″E
- Country: Iran
- Province: Lorestan
- County: Aligudarz
- District: Zalaqi
- Rural District: Zalaqi-ye Gharbi

Population (2016)
  - Total: 62
- Time zone: UTC+3:30 (IRST)

Chal Tella (Persian: چال طلا) (Note: Also romanized as Chāl Ţellā) is a village in Zalaqi-ye Gharbi Rural District of Zalaqi District (Note: Formerly Besharat District) in Aligudarz County, Lorestan province, Iran.

== Demographics ==
=== Population ===
At the time of the 2006 National Census, the village's population was 48 in eight households. The following census in 2011 counted 40 people in seven households. The 2016 census measured the population of the village as 62 people in 12 households.
