= Mobarakabad, Lorestan =

Village in Lorestan province, Iran

Mobarakabad Persian: مبارک آباد
- Village
- Location within Iran
- Country: Iran
- Province: Lorestan
- County: Aligudarz
- District: Zalaqi
- Rural District: Zalaqi-ye Sharqi

Population (2016)
  - Total: 21
- Time zone: UTC+3:30 (IRST)

Mobarakabad (Persian: مبارک آباد) (Note: Also romanized as Mobārak Ābād) is a village in Zalaqi-ye Sharqi Rural District of Zalaqi District (Note: Formerly Besharat District) in Aligudarz County, Lorestan province, Iran.

== Demographics ==
=== Population ===
At the time of the 2006 National Census, the village's population was 79 in 13 households. The following census in 2011 counted 35 people in nine households. The 2016 census measured the population of the village as 21 people in four households.
