= Parchel =

Village in Lorestan province, Iran

Parchel Persian: پرچل
- Village
- Location within Iran
- Coordinates: 32°55′23″N 49°28′33″E
- Country: Iran
- Province: Lorestan
- County: Aligudarz
- District: Zalaqi
- Rural District: Zalaqi-ye Gharbi

Population (2016)
  - Total: 319
- Time zone: UTC+3:30 (IRST)

Parchel (Persian: پرچل) is a village in, and the capital of, Zalaqi-ye Gharbi Rural District in Zalaqi District (Note: Formerly Besharat District) of Aligudarz County, Lorestan province, Iran.

== Demographics ==
=== Population ===
At the time of the 2006 National Census, the village's population was 554 in 82 households. The following census in 2011 counted 459 people in 92 households. The 2016 census measured the population of the village as 319 people in 73 households, the most populous in its rural district.
