= Sarastaneh =

Village in Lorestan province, Iran

Sarastaneh Persian: سراستانه
- Village
- Location within Iran
- Country: Iran
- Province: Lorestan
- County: Aligudarz
- District: Zalaqi
- Rural District: Zalaqi-ye Gharbi

Population (2016)
  - Total: Below reporting threshold
- Time zone: UTC+3:30 (IRST)

Sarastaneh (Persian: سراستانه) (Note: Also romanized as Sarāstāneh; also known as Sar Astan) is a village in Zalaqi-ye Gharbi Rural District of Zalaqi District (Note: Formerly Besharat District) in Aligudarz County, Lorestan province, Iran.

== Demographics ==
=== Population ===
At the time of the 2006 National Census, the village's population was 42 in six households. The following censuses in 2011 and 2016 counted a population below the reporting threshold.
