= Hasanabad Dermeni =

Village in Lorestan province, Iran

Hasanabad Dermeni Persian: حسن اباددرمني
- Village
- Location within Iran
- Coordinates: 33°03′07″N 49°34′59″E
- Country: Iran
- Province: Lorestan
- County: Aligudarz
- District: Zalaqi
- Rural District: Pishkuh-e Zalaqi

Population (2016)
  - Total: 41
- Time zone: UTC+3:30 (IRST)

Hasanabad Dermeni (Persian: حسن اباددرمني) (Note: Also romanized as Ḩasanābād Dermenī; also known as Ḩasanābād) is a village in Pishkuh-e Zalaqi Rural District of Zalaqi District (Note: Formerly Besharat District) in Aligudarz County, Lorestan province, Iran.

== Demographics ==
=== Population ===
At the time of the 2006 National Census, the village's population was 53 in 10 households. The following census in 2011 counted 47 people in 12 households. The 2016 census measured the population of the village as 41 people in 11 households.
