= Chalgaz =

Village in Lorestan province, Iran

Chalgaz Persian: چالگز
- Village
- Country: Iran
- Province: Lorestan
- County: Aligudarz
- District: Zalaqi
- Rural District: Zalaqi-ye Sharqi

Population (2016)
  - Total: 28
- Time zone: UTC+3:30 (IRST)

Chalgaz (Persian: چالگز) (Note: Also romanized as Chālgaz) is a village in Zalaqi-ye Sharqi Rural District of Zalaqi District (Note: Formerly Besharat District) in Aligudarz County, Lorestan province, Iran.

== Demographics ==
=== Population ===
At the time of the 2006 National Census, the village's population was 23 in five households. The following census in 2011 counted a population below the reporting threshold. The 2016 census measured the population of the village as 28 people in four households.
