= Gilan, Lorestan =

Village in Lorestan province, Iran

Gilan Persian: گيلان
- Village
- Location within Iran
- Coordinates: 33°06′32″N 49°36′19″E
- Country: Iran
- Province: Lorestan
- County: Aligudarz
- District: Zalaqi
- Rural District: Pishkuh-e Zalaqi

Population (2016)
  - Total: 33
- Time zone: UTC+3:30 (IRST)

Gilan (Persian: گيلان) (Note: Also romanized as Gīlān) is a village in Pishkuh-e Zalaqi Rural District of Zalaqi District (Note: Formerly Besharat District) in Aligudarz County, Lorestan province, Iran.

== Demographics ==
=== Population ===
At the time of the 2006 National Census, the village's population was 44 in eight households. The following census in 2011 counted 25 people in eight households. The 2016 census measured the population of the village as 33 people in nine households.
