= Mohammadabad, Aligudarz =

Village in Lorestan province, Iran

Mohammadabad Persian: محمد آباد
- Village
- Location within Iran
- Country: Iran
- Province: Lorestan
- County: Aligudarz
- District: Zalaqi
- Rural District: Zalaqi-ye Sharqi

Population (2016)
  - Total: 25
- Time zone: UTC+3:30 (IRST)

Mohammadabad (Persian: محمد آباد) (Note: Also romanized as Moḥammadābād) is a village in Zalaqi-ye Sharqi Rural District of Zalaqi District (Note: Formerly Besharat District) in Aligudarz County, Lorestan province, Iran.

== Demographics ==
=== Population ===
At the time of the 2006 National Census, the village's population was 57 in 10 households. The following census in 2011 counted 32 people in six households. The 2016 census measured the population of the village as 25 people in four households.
