= Haft Khani, Aligudarz =

Village in Lorestan province, Iran

Haft Khani Persian: هفتخوانی
- Village
- Country: Iran
- Province: Lorestan
- County: Aligudarz
- District: Zalaqi
- Rural District: Zalaqi-ye Sharqi

Population (2016)
  - Total: Below reporting threshold
- Time zone: UTC+3:30 (IRST)

Haft Khani (Persian: هفتخوانی) (Note: Also romanized as Haft Khānī, Haft Khvani, and Haft Khvānī) is a village in Zalaqi-ye Sharqi Rural District of Zalaqi District (Note: Formerly Besharat District) in Aligudarz County, Lorestan province, Iran.

== Demographics ==
=== Population ===
At the time of the 2006 National Census, the village's population was 96 in 18 households. The census in 2016 counted a population below the reporting threshold.
