= Chalshir =

Village in Lorestan province, Iran

Chalshir Persian: چالشير
- Village
- Country: Iran
- Province: Lorestan
- County: Aligudarz
- District: Zalaqi
- Rural District: Zalaqi-ye Gharbi

Population (2016)
  - Total: 85
- Time zone: UTC+3:30 (IRST)

Chalshir (Persian: چالشير) (Note: Also romanized as Chālshīr) is a village in Zalaqi-ye Gharbi Rural District of Zalaqi District (Note: Formerly Besharat District) in Aligudarz County, Lorestan province, Iran.

== Demographics ==
=== Population ===
At the time of the 2006 National Census, the village's population was 115 in 20 households. The following census in 2011 counted 102 people in 22 households. The 2016 census measured the population of the village as 85 people in 18 households.
