= Fila, Iran =

Village in Lorestan province, Iran

Fila Persian: فيلا
- Village
- Location within Iran
- Country: Iran
- Province: Lorestan
- County: Aligudarz
- District: Zalaqi
- Rural District: Zalaqi-ye Gharbi

Population (2016)
  - Total: 47
- Time zone: UTC+3:30 (IRST)

Fila (Persian: فيلا) (Note: Also romanized as Fīlā) is a village in Zalaqi-ye Gharbi Rural District of Zalaqi District (Note: Formerly Besharat District) in Aligudarz County, Lorestan province, Iran.

== Demographics ==
=== Population ===
At the time of the 2006 National Census, the village's population was 30 in four households. The following census in 2011 counted a population below the reporting threshold. The 2016 census measured the population of the village as 47 people in nine households.
