= Galleh Kur =

Village in Lorestan province, Iran

Galleh Kur Persian: گله كور
- Village
- Country: Iran
- Province: Lorestan
- County: Aligudarz
- District: Zalaqi
- Rural District: Zalaqi-ye Gharbi

Population (2016)
  - Total: Below reporting threshold
- Time zone: UTC+3:30 (IRST)

Galleh Kur (Persian: گله كور) (Note: Also romanized as Galleh Kūr) is a village in Zalaqi-ye Gharbi Rural District of Zalaqi District (Note: Formerly Besharat District) in Aligudarz County, Lorestan province, Iran.

== Demographics ==
=== Population ===
At the time of the 2006 National Census, the village's population was 33 in five households. The following census in 2011 counted 23 people in four households. The 2016 census measured the population of the village as below the reporting threshold.
