= Sabir Shah =

18th-century Punjabi Muslim mystic

Muhammad Sabir Shah (died 1748) was an 18th-century Punjabi Muslim fakir (wandering mystic), regarded as the spiritual teacher of Ahmad Shah Abdali, the founder of Durrani Empire.

Sabir Shah, whose real name was Raza Shah according to the Shahnama Ahmadiyya of Nizam al-Din 'Ishrat Sialkoti, was a horseshoe-maker by profession. He was born in Lahore, although following the Afghan writer Ghobar, some have claimed on the basis of misreading of a Persian text that he was from Kabul. According to Hari Ram Gupta, his father was named Husain while Ghobar names his father as Ustad Lahori. He was originally from Lahore, but had later settled in present-day Afghanistan. According to Jonathan L. Lee his name suggests Shi'ite affiliation.

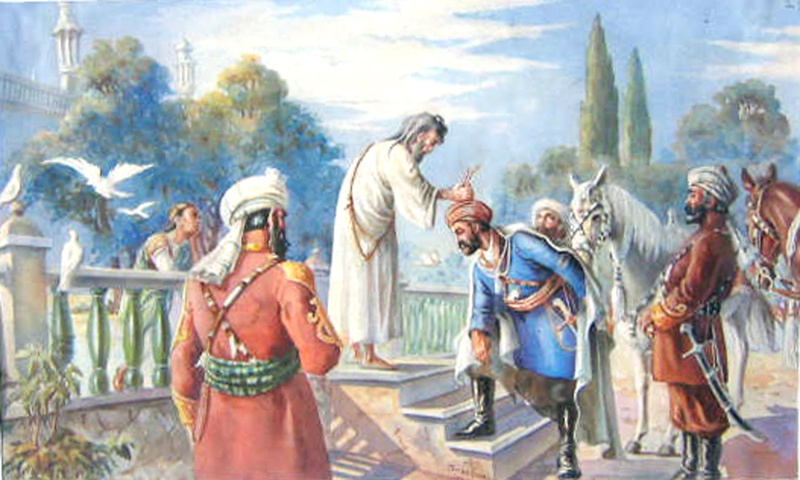
Depiction of coronation of Ahmad Shah Durrani by Sabir Shah in 1747 by putting a shoot of barley in his turban. Painting by Breshna, c. 1942/1943.

At the time of the jirgah which was held at Kandahar to select new shah of Durrani Empire in 1747, Sabir Shah was the caretaker of the shrine of Sheikh Surkh at Naderabad, situated 35 miles from Kandahar. Sabir Shah was reported to have prophesied the rise of Ahmad Shah to kingship at Mashhad before the death of Nader Shah. According to Ganda Singh, all biographical accounts of Ahmad Shah narrate the event of Sabir Shah crowning Ahmad Shah as the new ruler with some variations. Accordingly, Sabir Shah took some barley shoots from a nearby field and placed them into Ahmad Shah's turban, and proclaimed him to be the shah with the title of Durr-i-Duaran (lit. pearl of the age), which Ahmad Shah later amended as Durr-i-Durran (lit. pearl of the pearls), with his tribal name being changed from Abdali to Durrani. Lee comments that this gesture was mockery of grandiose coronation ceremonies of Safavids and Mughals. Symbolism of this event was later added by Afghan government into the national flag in the form of wheat wreath in the 1970s.

Sabir Shah was sent as his messenger to Lahore by Ahmad Shah, or went to Lahore by himself according to other sources, as Ahmad Shah marched with an army towards Punjab in 1748. Afraid by his religious influence, the governor of Lahore Shah Nawaz Khan ordered Sabir Shah to be put to death. His tomb is located besides Badshahi Mosque in Lahore.

== Sources ==
- Gupta, Hari Ram (1976). Later Mughal History of the Panjab (1707–1793). Lahore: Sang-e-Meel Publications.
- Singh, Ganda (1959). Ahmad Shah Durrani: Father of Modern Afghanistan. Asia Publishing House. OCLC 1016251090.
- Lee, Jonathan L. (2019). Afghanistan: A History from 1260 to the Present. London: Reaktion Books. ISBN 978-1-78914-010-1.
