= Kish Galeh Bid =

Village in Lorestan province, Iran

Kish Galeh Bid Persian: كيش گله بيد
- Village
- Location within Iran
- Country: Iran
- Province: Lorestan
- County: Aligudarz
- District: Zalaqi
- Rural District: Zalaqi-ye Sharqi

Population (2016)
  - Total: 137
- Time zone: UTC+3:30 (IRST)

Kish Galeh Bid (Persian: كيش گله بيد) (Note: Also romanized as Kīsh Galeh Bīd) is a village in Zalaqi-ye Sharqi Rural District of Zalaqi District (Note: Formerly Besharat District) in Aligudarz County, Lorestan province, Iran.

== Demographics ==
=== Population ===
At the time of the 2006 National Census, the village's population was 84 in 15 households. The following census in 2011 counted 173 people in 34 households. The 2016 census measured the population of the village as 137 people in 32 households.
