= Sar Qaleh Zivar =

Sar Qaleh Zivar سرقلعه زيوار
- Village
- Location within Iran
- Coordinates: 32°00′30″N 49°51′54″E
- Country: Iran
- Province: Khuzestan
- County: Izeh
- Bakhsh: Susan
- Rural District: Susan-e Gharbi

Population (2006)
  - Total: 228
- Time zone: UTC+3:30 (IRST)
  - Summer (DST): UTC+4:30 (IRDT)

Sar Qaleh Zivar (Persian: سرقلعه زيوار, also Romanized as Sar Qal‘eh Zīvār; also known as Sar Qal‘eh Zīvār-e Bālā) is a village in Susan-e Gharbi Rural District, Susan District, Izeh County, Khuzestan Province, Iran. At the 2006 census, its population was 228, in 35 families.
