= Abbasi, Aligudarz =

Village in Lorestan province, Iran

Abbasi Persian: عباسي
- Village
- Location within Iran
- Coordinates: 32°48′30″N 49°25′43″E
- Country: Iran
- Province: Lorestan
- County: Aligudarz
- District: Zalaqi
- Rural District: Zalaqi-ye Gharbi

Population (2016)
  - Total: 39
- Time zone: UTC+3:30 (IRST)

Abbasi (Persian: عباسي) (Note: Also romanized as ‘Abbāsī; also known as Alān ‘Abbāsī) is a village in Zalaqi-ye Gharbi Rural District of Zalaqi District (Note: Formerly Besharat District) in Aligudarz County, Lorestan province, Iran.

== Demographics ==
=== Population ===
At the time of the 2006 National Census, the village's population was 90 in 14 households. The following census in 2011 counted 54 people in 11 households. The 2016 census measured the population of the village as 39 people in seven households.
