= Chal Qaleh =

Village in Lorestan province, Iran

Chal Qaleh Persian: چال قلعه
- Village
- Location within Iran
- Coordinates: 33°05′17″N 49°38′11″E
- Country: Iran
- Province: Lorestan
- County: Aligudarz
- District: Zalaqi
- Rural District: Pishkuh-e Zalaqi

Population (2016)
  - Total: 40
- Time zone: UTC+3:30 (IRST)

Chal Qaleh (Persian: چال قلعه) (Note: Also romanized as Chāl Qal‘eh) is a village in Pishkuh-e Zalaqi Rural District of Zalaqi District (Note: Formerly Besharat District) in Aligudarz County, Lorestan province, Iran.

== Demographics ==
=== Population ===
At the time of the 2006 National Census, the village's population was 53 in eight households. The following census in 2011 counted 71 people in 12 households. The 2016 census measured the population of the village as 40 people in eight households.
