= Dam Dam =

Village in Lorestan province, Iran

Dam Dam Persian: دم دم
- Village
- Country: Iran
- Province: Lorestan
- County: Aligudarz
- District: Zalaqi
- Rural District: Zalaqi-ye Gharbi

Population (2016)
  - Total: 18
- Time zone: UTC+3:30 (IRST)

Dam Dam (Persian: دم‌دم) is a village in Zalaqi-ye Gharbi Rural District of Zalaqi District (Note: Formerly Besharat District) in Aligudarz County, Lorestan province, Iran.

== Demographics ==
=== Population ===
At the time of the 2006 National Census, the village's population was 36 in eight households. The following census in 2011 counted 39 people in six households. The 2016 census measured the population of the village as 18 people in four households.
