= Kagelestan =

Village in Lorestan province, Iran

Kagelestan Persian: كاگلستان
- Village
- Location within Iran
- Coordinates: 33°01′32″N 49°38′51″E
- Country: Iran
- Province: Lorestan
- County: Aligudarz
- District: Zalaqi
- Rural District: Pishkuh-e Zalaqi

Population (2016)
  - Total: 98
- Time zone: UTC+3:30 (IRST)

Kagelestan (Persian: كاگلستان) (Note: Also romanized as Kāgelestān; also known as Kākelestān, Kākestān, Kākolestān, and Kākolestān-e ‘Olyā) is a village in Pishkuh-e Zalaqi Rural District of Zalaqi District (Note: Formerly Besharat District) in Aligudarz County, Lorestan province, Iran.

== Demographics ==
=== Population ===
At the time of the 2006 National Census, the village's population was 116 in 23 households. The following census in 2011 counted 86 people in 18 households. The 2016 census measured the population of the village as 98 people in 10 households.
