= Ab Kaseh, Lorestan =

Village in Lorestan province, Iran

Ab Kaseh Persian: اب كاسه
- Village
- Location within Iran
- Coordinates: 32°55′07″N 49°28′39″E
- Country: Iran
- Province: Lorestan
- County: Aligudarz
- District: Zalaqi
- Rural District: Zalaqi-ye Gharbi

Population (2016)
  - Total: 115
- Time zone: UTC+3:30 (IRST)

Ab Kaseh (Persian: اب كاسه) (Note: Also romanized as Āb Kāseh) is a village in Zalaqi-ye Gharbi Rural District of Zalaqi District (Note: Formerly Besharat District) in Aligudarz County, Lorestan province, Iran.

== Demographics ==
=== Population ===
At the time of the 2006 National Census, the village's population was 115 in 17 households. The following census in 2011 counted 90 people in 19 households. The 2016 census measured the population of the village as 115 people in 17 households.
