= Deh-e Borzu, Lorestan =

Village in Lorestan province, Iran

Deh-e Borzu Persian: ده برزو
- Village
- Location within Iran
- Coordinates: 33°07′19″N 49°39′38″E
- Country: Iran
- Province: Lorestan
- County: Aligudarz
- District: Zalaqi
- Rural District: Pishkuh-e Zalaqi

Population (2016)
  - Total: 70
- Time zone: UTC+3:30 (IRST)

Deh-e Borzu (Persian: ده برزو) (Note: Also romanized as Deh-e Borzū) is a village in Pishkuh-e Zalaqi Rural District of Zalaqi District (Note: Formerly Besharat District) in Aligudarz County, Lorestan province, Iran.

== Demographics ==
=== Population ===
At the time of the 2006 National Census, the village's population was 76 in 13 households. The following census in 2011 counted 60 people in 12 households. The 2016 census measured the population of the village as 70 people in 19 households.
