= Suyi =

Village in Lorestan province, Iran

Suyi Persian: سوي
- Village
- Country: Iran
- Province: Lorestan
- County: Aligudarz
- District: Zalaqi
- Rural District: Zalaqi-ye Gharbi

Population (2016)
  - Total: 23
- Time zone: UTC+3:30 (IRST)

Suyi (Persian: سوي) (Note: Also romanized as Sūyī) is a village in Zalaqi-ye Gharbi Rural District of Zalaqi District (Note: Formerly Besharat District) in Aligudarz County, Lorestan province, Iran.

== Demographics ==
=== Population ===
At the time of the 2006 National Census, the village's population was 31 in four households. The following census in 2011 counted 59 people in 12 households. The 2016 census measured the population of the village as 23 people in five households.
