= Kherseyun =

Village in Lorestan province, Iran

Kherseyun Persian: خرسيون
- Village
- Location within Iran
- Coordinates: 33°07′14″N 49°39′21″E
- Country: Iran
- Province: Lorestan
- County: Aligudarz
- District: Zalaqi
- Rural District: Pishkuh-e Zalaqi

Population (2016)
  - Total: 103
- Time zone: UTC+3:30 (IRST)

Kherseyun (Persian: خرسيون) (Note: Also romanized as Kherseyūn and Khersīyūn; also known as Ḩerseyūn, Khersian, and Khersīān) is a village in Pishkuh-e Zalaqi Rural District of Zalaqi District (Note: Formerly Besharat District) in Aligudarz County, Lorestan province, Iran.

== Demographics ==
=== Population ===
At the time of the 2006 National Census, the village's population was 133 in 23 households. The following census in 2011 counted 94 people in 21 households. The 2016 census measured the population of the village as 103 people in 27 households.
