= Dareshgeft, Aligudarz =

Village in Lorestan province, Iran

Dareshgeft Persian: دراشگفت
- Village
- Country: Iran
- Province: Lorestan
- County: Aligudarz
- District: Zalaqi
- Rural District: Zalaqi-ye Sharqi

Population (2016)
  - Total: 26
- Time zone: UTC+3:30 (IRST)

Dareshgeft (Persian: دراشگفت) (Note: Also romanized as Darāshgeft) is a village in Zalaqi-ye Sharqi Rural District of Zalaqi District (Note: Formerly Besharat District) in Aligudarz County, Lorestan province, Iran.

== Demographics ==
=== Population ===
At the time of the 2006 National Census, the village's population was 38 in six households. The following census in 2011 counted 57 people in 14 households. The 2016 census measured the population of the village as 26 people in seven households.
