= Deh-e Seyyed =

Village in Lorestan province, Iran

Deh-e Seyyed Persian: ده سيد
- Village
- Location within Iran
- Country: Iran
- Province: Lorestan
- County: Aligudarz
- District: Zalaqi
- Rural District: Pishkuh-e Zalaqi

Population (2016)
  - Total: 28
- Time zone: UTC+3:30 (IRST)

Deh-e Seyyed (Persian: ده سيد) (Note: Also known as Deh-e Seyyed Moḩammad ‘Alī) is a village in Pishkuh-e Zalaqi Rural District of Zalaqi District (Note: Formerly Besharat District) in Aligudarz County, Lorestan province, Iran.

== Demographics ==
=== Population ===
At the time of the 2006 National Census, the village's population was 24 in five households. The following census in 2011 counted 31 people in nine households. The 2016 census measured the population of the village as 28 people in seven households.
