= Rezayi, Lorestan =

Village in Lorestan province, Iran

Rezayi Persian: رضايي
- Village
- Country: Iran
- Province: Lorestan
- County: Aligudarz
- District: Zalaqi
- Rural District: Zalaqi-ye Gharbi

Population (2016)
  - Total: 31
- Time zone: UTC+3:30 (IRST)

Rezayi (Persian: رضايي) (Note: Also romanized as Rez'āyī) is a village in Zalaqi-ye Gharbi Rural District of Zalaqi District (Note: Formerly Besharat District) in Aligudarz County, Lorestan province, Iran.

== Demographics ==
=== Population ===
At the time of the 2006 National Census, the village's population was 40 in seven households. The following census in 2011 counted 76 people in 17 households. The 2016 census measured the population of the village as 31 people in eight households.
