= Alun Abbasi =

Village in Lorestan province, Iran

Alun Abbasi Persian: الون عباسي
- Village
- Location within Iran
- Coordinates: 32°49′26″N 49°27′22″E
- Country: Iran
- Province: Lorestan
- County: Aligudarz
- District: Zalaqi
- Rural District: Zalaqi-ye Gharbi

Population (2016)
  - Total: 101
- Time zone: UTC+3:30 (IRST)

Alun Abbasi (Persian: الون عباسي) (Note: Also romanized as Ālūn ʿAbbāsī; also known as Ālūn and Alūn) is a village in Zalaqi-ye Gharbi Rural District of Zalaqi District (Note: Formerly Besharat District) in Aligudarz County, Lorestan province, Iran.

== Demographics ==
=== Population ===
At the time of the 2006 National Census, the village's population was 109 in 17 households. The following census in 2011 counted 77 people in 15 households. The 2016 census measured the population of the village as 101 people in 27 households.
