= Hendileh =

Village in Lorestan province, Iran

Hendileh Persian: هنديله
- Village
- Location within Iran
- Coordinates: 33°05′53″N 49°39′37″E
- Country: Iran
- Province: Lorestan
- County: Aligudarz
- District: Zalaqi
- Rural District: Pishkuh-e Zalaqi

Population (2016)
  - Total: 17
- Time zone: UTC+3:30 (IRST)

Hendileh (Persian: هنديله) (Note: Also romanized as Hendīleh) is a village in Pishkuh-e Zalaqi Rural District of Zalaqi District (Note: Formerly Besharat District) in Aligudarz County, Lorestan province, Iran.

== Demographics ==
=== Population ===
At the time of the 2006 National Census, the village's population was 24 in five households. The following census in 2011 counted 12 people in four households. The 2016 census measured the population of the village as 17 people in six households.
