= Pandaki =

Village in Lorestan province, Iran

Pandaki Persian: پندكي
- Village
- Country: Iran
- Province: Lorestan
- County: Aligudarz
- District: Zalaqi
- Rural District: Zalaqi-ye Sharqi

Population (2016)
  - Total: 15
- Time zone: UTC+3:30 (IRST)

Pandaki (Persian: پندكي) (Note: Also romanized as Pandaḵī) is a village in Zalaqi-ye Sharqi Rural District of Zalaqi District (Note: Formerly Besharat District) in Aligudarz County, Lorestan province, Iran.

== Demographics ==
=== Population ===
At the time of the 2006 National Census, the village's population was 46 in seven households. The following census in 2011 counted 38 people in seven households. The 2016 census measured the population of the village as 15 people in five households.
