= Emamzadeh Mohammad Hasan =

Village in Lorestan province, Iran

Emamzadeh Mohammad Hasan Persian: امامزاده محمدحسن
- Village
- Location within Iran
- Country: Iran
- Province: Lorestan
- County: Aligudarz
- District: Zalaqi
- Rural District: Zalaqi-ye Gharbi

Population (2016)
  - Total: 141
- Time zone: UTC+3:30 (IRST)

Emamzadeh Mohammad Hasan (Persian: امامزاده محمدحسن) (Note: Also romanized as Emāmzādeh Moḩammad Ḩasan) is a village in Zalaqi-ye Gharbi Rural District of Zalaqi District (Note: Formerly Besharat District) in Aligudarz County, Lorestan province, Iran.

== Demographics ==
=== Population ===
At the time of the 2006 National Census, the village's population was 94 in 17 households. The following census in 2011 counted 127 people in 25 households. The 2016 census measured the population of the village as 141 people in 28 households.
