= Ab Gazag =

Village in Lorestan province, Iran

Ab Gazag Persian: اب گزگ
- Village
- Country: Iran
- Province: Lorestan
- County: Aligudarz
- District: Zalaqi
- Rural District: Zalaqi-ye Gharbi

Population (2016)
  - Total: 54
- Time zone: UTC+3:30 (IRST)

Ab Gazag (Persian: اب گزگ) (Note: Also romanized as Āb Gazag) is a village in Zalaqi-ye Gharbi Rural District of Zalaqi District (Note: Formerly Besharat District) in Aligudarz County, Lorestan province, Iran.

== Demographics ==
=== Population ===
At the time of the 2006 National Census, the village's population was 89 in 15 households. The following census in 2011 counted 68 people in 13 households. The 2016 census measured the population of the village as 54 people in 13 households.
