= Qolian, Lorestan =

Village in Lorestan province, Iran

Qolian Persian: قليان
- Village
- Location within Iran
- Coordinates: 33°04′44″N 49°38′48″E
- Country: Iran
- Province: Lorestan
- County: Aligudarz
- District: Zalaqi
- Rural District: Pishkuh-e Zalaqi

Population (2016)
  - Total: 62
- Time zone: UTC+3:30 (IRST)

Qolian (Persian: قليان) (Note: Also romanized as Qalyān, Qoleyān, and Qolīān) is a village in Pishkuh-e Zalaqi Rural District of Zalaqi District (Note: Formerly Besharat District) in Aligudarz County, Lorestan province, Iran.

== Demographics ==
=== Population ===
At the time of the 2006 National Census, the village's population was 45 in seven households. The following census in 2011 counted 39 people in 11 households. The 2016 census measured the population of the village as 62 people in 20 households.
