= Piezo =

Piezo is derived from the Greek πιέζω, which means to squeeze or press, and may refer to:

- PIEZO1, a mechanosensitive ion protein
- Piezoelectric pickups for guitars and other musical instruments
- Piezoelectric sensor, a device that converts differences in physical force to generate voltage
- Piezoelectric speaker, a type of small loudspeaker
- Piezoelectricity, electrical charge built up in response to mechanical stress
- Piezometer, a device that measures the pressure of groundwater at a certain point
- Piezoresistive effect, a change in the electrical resistance of a material in response to mechanical stress
- Piezorina, a genus of South American bird
- Micro Piezo, a print head technology developed by Epson
- Piezo ignition, an ignition method based on the piezoelectric effect

== See also ==
- Pez (disambiguation)
- Pie (disambiguation)
