= Dehgah, Aligudarz =

Village in Lorestan province, Iran

Dehgah Persian: دهگاه
- Village
- Location within Iran
- Coordinates: 33°03′09″N 49°35′12″E
- Country: Iran
- Province: Lorestan
- County: Aligudarz
- District: Zalaqi
- Rural District: Pishkuh-e Zalaqi

Population (2016)
  - Total: 23
- Time zone: UTC+3:30 (IRST)

Dehgah (Persian: دهگاه) (Note: Also romanized as Dehgāh) is a village in Pishkuh-e Zalaqi Rural District of Zalaqi District (Note: Formerly Besharat District) in Aligudarz County, Lorestan province, Iran.

== Demographics ==
=== Population ===
At the time of the 2006 National Census, the village's population was 40 in eight households. The following census in 2011 counted 12 people in four households. The 2016 census measured the population of the village as 23 people in six households.
