= Shimane (disambiguation) =

Shimane usually refers to Shimane Prefecture, a prefecture of Japan located in the Chūgoku of Honshu. Shimane may also refer to:

- Shimane at-large district, a constituency that represents Shimane Prefecture in the House of Councillors in the Diet of Japan
- Shimane, Shimane, a town located in Yatsuka District, Shimane Prefecture, Japan
- Shimane (Saitama), a district in Nishi ward of Saitama city
- Shimane (Adachi), a district in Adachi special ward in the Tokyo Metropolis

== See also ==
- Shiman, a village in Susan-e Gharbi Rural District, Susan District, Izeh County, Khuzestan Province, Iran
