= Javad-e Seyyedi =

Village in Khuzestan province, Iran

Javad-e Seyyedi Persian: جوادسعیدی
- Village
- Location within Iran
- Coordinates: 31°59′44″N 49°53′27″E
- Country: Iran
- Province: Khuzestan
- County: Izeh
- District: Susan
- Rural District: Susan-e Gharbi

Population (2016)
  - Total: 872
- Time zone: UTC+3:30 (IRST)

Javad-e Seyyedi (Persian: جوادسعیدی) (Note: Also romanized as Javād-e Seyyedī) is a village in Susan-e Gharbi Rural District of Susan District, Izeh County, Khuzestan province, Iran.

== Demographics ==
=== Population ===
At the time of the 2006 National Census, the village's population was 837 in 145 households, when it was in the Central District. The following census in 2011 counted 1,088 people in 217 households, by which time the rural district had been separated from the district in the formation of Susan District. The 2016 census measured the population of the village as 872 people in 194 households. It was the most populous village in its rural district.
