= Khakbetiyeh =

Village in Lorestan province, Iran

Khakbetiyeh Persian: خاكبتيه
- Village
- Location within Iran
- Coordinates: 33°07′52″N 49°39′38″E
- Country: Iran
- Province: Lorestan
- County: Aligudarz
- District: Zalaqi
- Rural District: Pishkuh-e Zalaqi

Population (2016)
  - Total: 404
- Time zone: UTC+3:30 (IRST)

Khakbetiyeh (Persian: خاكبتيه) (Note: Also romanized as Khāk Betyeh and Khākbetīyeh; also known as Khak Beh Tiyeh, Khāk Beh Tīyeh, and Khāk Petyeh) is a village in Pishkuh-e Zalaqi Rural District of Zalaqi District (Note: Formerly Besharat District) in Aligudarz County, Lorestan province, Iran.

== Demographics ==
=== Population ===
At the time of the 2006 National Census, the village's population was 512 in 86 households. The following census in 2011 counted 437 people in 99 households. The 2016 census measured the population of the village as 404 people in 125 households, the most populous in its rural district.
