= Kal Gah, Lorestan =

Village in Lorestan province, Iran

Kal Gah Persian: كل گاه
- Village
- Country: Iran
- Province: Lorestan
- County: Aligudarz
- District: Zalaqi
- Rural District: Zalaqi-ye Gharbi

Population (2016)
  - Total: 19
- Time zone: UTC+3:30 (IRST)

Kal Gah (Persian: كل گاه) (Note: Also romanized as Kal Gāh) is a village in Zalaqi-ye Gharbi Rural District of Zalaqi District (Note: Formerly Besharat District) in Aligudarz County, Lorestan province, Iran.

== Demographics ==
=== Population ===
At the time of the 2006 National Census, the village's population was 40 in seven households. The following census in 2011 counted 32 people in five households. The 2016 census measured the population of the village as 19 people in four households.
