= Abbas Barfi =

Village in Lorestan province, Iran

Abbas Barfi Persian: عباس برفي
- Village
- Location within Iran
- Coordinates: 33°01′30″N 49°36′49″E
- Country: Iran
- Province: Lorestan
- County: Aligudarz
- District: Zalaqi
- Rural District: Pishkuh-e Zalaqi

Population (2016)
  - Total: 128
- Time zone: UTC+3:30 (IRST)

Abbas Barfi (Persian: عباس برفي) (Note: Also romanized as ‘Abbās Barfī; also known as Abbās Bar, ‘Abbās Barfī-ye Soflá, and ‘Abbās Barqī) is a village in Pishkuh-e Zalaqi Rural District of Zalaqi District (Note: Formerly Besharat District) in Aligudarz County, Lorestan province, Iran.

== Demographics ==
=== Population ===
At the time of the 2006 National Census, the village's population was 203 in 38 households. The following census in 2011 counted 148 people in 34 households. The 2016 census measured the population of the village as 128 people in 34 households.
