= Kizan Darreh =

Village in Lorestan province, Iran

Kizan Darreh Persian: كيزان دره
- Village
- Location within Iran
- Coordinates: 33°02′50″N 49°35′31″E
- Country: Iran
- Province: Lorestan
- County: Aligudarz
- District: Zalaqi
- Rural District: Pishkuh-e Zalaqi

Population (2016)
  - Total: 80
- Time zone: UTC+3:30 (IRST)

Kizan Darreh (Persian: كيزان دره) (Note: Also romanized as Kīzān Darreh; also known as Kīzūn Darreh) is a village in, and the capital of, Pishkuh-e Zalaqi Rural District in Zalaqi District (Note: Formerly Besharat District) of Aligudarz County, Lorestan province, Iran.

== Demographics ==
=== Population ===
At the time of the 2006 National Census, the village's population was 148 in 23 households. The following census in 2011 counted 106 people in 26 households. The 2016 census measured the population of the village as 80 people in 21 households.
