= Galeh Muh =

Village in Lorestan province, Iran

Galeh Muh Persian: گله موه
- Village
- Location within Iran
- Coordinates: 32°57′07″N 49°37′33″E
- Country: Iran
- Province: Lorestan
- County: Aligudarz
- District: Zalaqi
- Rural District: Zalaqi-ye Sharqi

Population (2016)
  - Total: Below reporting threshold
- Time zone: UTC+3:30 (IRST)

Galeh Muh (Persian: گله موه) (Note: Also romanized as Galeh Mūh; also known as Galeh Mu, also romanized as Galeh Mū) is a village in Zalaqi-ye Sharqi Rural District of Zalaqi District (Note: Formerly Besharat District) in Aligudarz County, Lorestan province, Iran.

== Demographics ==
=== Population ===
At the time of the 2006 National Census, the village's population was 249 in four households. The following censuses in 2011 and 2016 counted a population below the reporting threshold.
