= Dehnow, Aligudarz =

Village in Lorestan province, Iran

Dehnow Persian: ده نو
- Village
- Location within Iran
- Country: Iran
- Province: Lorestan
- County: Aligudarz
- District: Zalaqi
- Rural District: Zalaqi-ye Sharqi

Population (2016)
  - Total: Below reporting threshold
- Time zone: UTC+3:30 (IRST)

Dehnow (Persian: ده نو) (Note: Also known as Dehnow Barbarood) is a village in Zalaqi-ye Sharqi Rural District of Zalaqi District (Note: Formerly Besharat District) in Aligudarz County, Lorestan province, Iran.

== Demographics ==
=== Population ===
At the time of the 2006 National Census, the village's population was 33 in five households. The following census in 2011 counted 33 people in seven households. The 2016 census measured the population of the village as below the reporting threshold.
