= Sarabad Bar Aftab =

Village in Lorestan province, Iran

Sarabad Bar Aftab Persian: سارآباد برآفتاب
- Village
- Location within Iran
- Country: Iran
- Province: Lorestan
- County: Aligudarz
- District: Zalaqi
- Rural District: Zalaqi-ye Sharqi

Population (2016)
  - Total: 15
- Time zone: UTC+3:30 (IRST)

Sarabad Bar Aftab (Persian: سارآباد برآفتاب) (Note: Also romanized as Sārābād Bar Āftāb; also known as Sarabad) is a village in Zalaqi-ye Sharqi Rural District of Zalaqi District (Note: Formerly Besharat District) in Aligudarz County, Lorestan province, Iran.

== Demographics ==
=== Population ===
At the time of the 2006 National Census, the village's population was 29 in six households. The 2016 census measured the population of the village as 15 people in four households.
