= Ordowt-e Nazer =

Ordowt-e Nazer اردوت نظر
- Village
- Country: Iran
- Province: Khuzestan
- County: Izeh
- Bakhsh: Susan
- Rural District: Susan-e Gharbi

Population (2006)
  - Total: 44
- Time zone: UTC+3:30 (IRST)
  - Summer (DST): UTC+4:30 (IRDT)

Ordowt-e Nazer (Persian: اردوت نظر, also Romanized as Ordowt-e Naẓer) is a village in Susan-e Gharbi Rural District, Susan District, Izeh County, Khuzestan Province, Iran. At the 2006 census, its population was 44, in 5 families.
