= Darreh Mahi Sofla =

Village in Lorestan province, Iran

Darreh Mahi Sofla Persian: دره ماهي سفلي
- Village
- Location within Iran
- Coordinates: 33°01′39″N 49°37′46″E
- Country: Iran
- Province: Lorestan
- County: Aligudarz
- District: Zalaqi
- Rural District: Pishkuh-e Zalaqi

Population (2016)
  - Total: 22
- Time zone: UTC+3:30 (IRST)

Darreh Mahi Sofla (Persian: دره ماهي سفلي) (Note: Also romanized as Darreh Māhī Soflá and Darreh Māhī-ye Soflá; also known as Darreh Māhī-ye Pā’īn and Darreh Māhī-ye Pā‘īn) is a village in Pishkuh-e Zalaqi Rural District of Zalaqi District (Note: Formerly Besharat District) in Aligudarz County, Lorestan province, Iran.

== Demographics ==
=== Population ===
At the time of the 2006 National Census, the village's population, as Darreh Mahi Sofla, was 119 in 22 households. The following census in 2011 counted 52 people in 10 households, by which time the village was listed as Darreh. The 2016 census measured the population of the village as 22 people in five households.
