= Darreh Mahi Olya =

Village in Lorestan province, Iran

Darreh Mahi Olya Persian: دره ماهي عليا
- Village
- Location within Iran
- Coordinates: 33°01′19″N 49°38′17″E
- Country: Iran
- Province: Lorestan
- County: Aligudarz
- District: Zalaqi
- Rural District: Pishkuh-e Zalaqi

Population (2016)
  - Total: 60
- Time zone: UTC+3:30 (IRST)

Darreh Mahi Olya (Persian: دره ماهي عليا) (Note: Also romanized as Darreh Māhī Olyā and Darreh Māhī-ye 'Olyā; also known as Darreh Māhī and Darreh Māhī-ye Bālā) is a village in Pishkuh-e Zalaqi Rural District of Zalaqi District (Note: Formerly Besharat District) in Aligudarz County, Lorestan province, Iran.

== Demographics ==
=== Population ===
At the time of the 2006 National Census, the village's population, as Darreh Mahi Olya, was 57 in 10 households. The following census in 2011 counted 76 people in 15 households, by which time the village was listed as Darreh. The 2016 census measured the population of the village as 60 people in 16 households.
