= Hastak =

Village in Lorestan province, Iran

Hastak Persian: هستك
- Village
- Country: Iran
- Province: Lorestan
- County: Aligudarz
- District: Zalaqi
- Rural District: Zalaqi-ye Sharqi

Population (2016)
  - Total: 85
- Time zone: UTC+3:30 (IRST)

Hastak (Persian: هستك) is a village in Zalaqi-ye Sharqi Rural District of Zalaqi District (Note: Formerly Besharat District) in Aligudarz County, Lorestan province, Iran.

== Demographics ==
=== Population ===
At the time of the 2006 National Census, the village's population was 108 in 20 households. The following census in 2011 counted 88 people in 17 households. The 2016 census measured the population of the village as 85 people in 20 households.
