= Tindar =

Village in Lorestan province, Iran

Tindar Persian: تيندر
- Village
- Country: Iran
- Province: Lorestan
- County: Aligudarz
- District: Zalaqi
- Rural District: Zalaqi-ye Sharqi

Population (2016)
  - Total: 96
- Time zone: UTC+3:30 (IRST)

Tindar (Persian: تيندر) (Note: Also romanized as Tīndar) is a village in Zalaqi-ye Sharqi Rural District of Zalaqi District (Note: Formerly Besharat District) in Aligudarz County, Lorestan province, Iran.

== Demographics ==
=== Population ===
At the time of the 2006 National Census, the village's population was 114 in 20 households. The following census in 2011 counted 90 people in 16 households. The 2016 census measured the population of the village as 96 people in 20 households.
