= Nokhvodkar Dermeni =

Village in Lorestan province, Iran

Nokhvodkar Dermeni Persian: نخودكاردرمني
- Village
- Location within Iran
- Coordinates: 33°02′55″N 49°34′28″E
- Country: Iran
- Province: Lorestan
- County: Aligudarz
- District: Zalaqi
- Rural District: Pishkuh-e Zalaqi

Population (2016)
  - Total: Below reporting threshold
- Time zone: UTC+3:30 (IRST)

Nokhvodkar Dermeni (Persian: نخودكاردرمني) (Note: Also romanized as Nokhvodkār Dermenī; also known as Nokhvodkār) is a village in Pishkuh-e Zalaqi Rural District of Zalaqi District (Note: Formerly Besharat District) in Aligudarz County, Lorestan province, Iran.

== Demographics ==
=== Population ===
At the time of the 2006 National Census, the village's population was 39 in five households. The 2016 census measured the population of the village as below the reporting threshold.
