= Bisheh Khazan =

Village in Lorestan province, Iran

Bisheh Khazan Persian: بيشه خزان
- Village
- Location within Iran
- Coordinates: 33°00′11″N 49°36′39″E
- Country: Iran
- Province: Lorestan
- County: Aligudarz
- District: Zalaqi
- Rural District: Pishkuh-e Zalaqi

Population (2016)
  - Total: 23
- Time zone: UTC+3:30 (IRST)

Bisheh Khazan (Persian: بيشه خزان) (Note: Also romanized as Bīsheh Khazān; also known as Bīsh Khazān) is a village in Pishkuh-e Zalaqi Rural District of Zalaqi District (Note: Formerly Besharat District) in Aligudarz County, Lorestan province, Iran.

== Demographics ==
=== Population ===
At the time of the 2006 National Census, the village's population was 33 in six households. The following census in 2011 counted 37 people in seven households. The 2016 census measured the population of the village as 23 people in four households.
