= Darreh Chah, Jam =

Darreh Chah دره چاه
- Village
- Location within Iran
- Coordinates: 27°52′30″N 52°15′09″E
- Country: Iran
- Province: Bushehr
- County: Jam
- Bakhsh: Central
- Rural District: Kuri

Population (2006)
  - Total: 135
- Time zone: UTC+3:30 (IRST)
  - Summer (DST): UTC+4:30 (IRDT)

Darreh Chah (Persian: دره چاه, also Romanized as Darreh Chāh; also known as Dar Chāh) is a village in Kuri Rural District, in the Central District of Jam County, Bushehr Province, Iran. At the 2006 census, its population was 135, in 30 families.
