= Kish Olya =

Village in Lorestan province, Iran

Kish Olya Persian: کيش عليا
- Village
- Location within Iran
- Coordinates: 32°53′26″N 49°40′13″E
- Country: Iran
- Province: Lorestan
- County: Aligudarz
- District: Zalaqi
- Rural District: Zalaqi-ye Sharqi

Population (2016)
  - Total: Below reporting threshold
- Time zone: UTC+3:30 (IRST)

Kish Olya (Persian: کيش عليا) (Note: Also romanized as Kīsh ʿOlyā; also known as Kish Bazanvid (کيش بزنويد), also romanized as Kīsh Bazanvīd) is a village in, and the former capital of, Zalaqi-ye Sharqi Rural District in Zalaqi District (Note: Formerly Besharat District) of Aligudarz County, Lorestan province, Iran. It is also the former capital of the district. The administrative center for the district has been transferred to the city of Titkan, and the capital of the rural district has been transferred to Chaleh Pareh.

== Demographics ==
=== Population ===
At the time of the 2006 National Census, the village's population was 111 in 19 households. The following census in 2011 counted 946 people in 13 households. The population was below the reporting threshold at the time of the 2016 census.
