= Torshak, Khuzestan =

Village in Khuzestan province, Iran

Torshak Persian: ترشك
- Village
- Location within Iran
- Coordinates: 32°00′06″N 49°49′29″E
- Country: Iran
- Province: Khuzestan
- County: Izeh
- District: Susan
- Rural District: Susan-e Gharbi

Population (2016)
  - Total: 268
- Time zone: UTC+3:30 (IRST)

Torshak (Persian: ترشك) (Note: Also romanized as Tarashok and Tareshok) is a village in Susan-e Gharbi Rural District of Susan District, Izeh County, Khuzestan province, Iran, serving as capital of both the district and the rural district.

== Demographics ==
=== Population ===
At the time of the 2006 National Census, the village's population was 284 in 59 households, when it was in the Central District. The following census in 2011 counted 241 people in 53 households, by which time the rural district had been separated from the district in the formation of Susan District. The 2016 census measured the population of the village as 268 people in 64 households.
