= Darreh Lir, Lorestan =

Village in Lorestan province, Iran

Darreh Lir Persian: دره لير
- Village
- Location within Iran
- Coordinates: 32°53′39″N 49°39′07″E
- Country: Iran
- Province: Lorestan
- County: Aligudarz
- District: Zalaqi
- Rural District: Zalaqi-ye Sharqi

Population (2016)
  - Total: 0
- Time zone: UTC+3:30 (IRST)

Darreh Lir (Persian: دره لير) (Note: Also romanized as Darreh Līr) is a village in Zalaqi-ye Sharqi Rural District of Zalaqi District (Note: Formerly Besharat District) in Aligudarz County, Lorestan province, Iran.

== Demographics ==
=== Population ===
At the time of the 2006 National Census, the village's population was 25 in four households. The 2016 census measured the population of the village as zero.
