= Larm, Susan =

Larm لارم
- Village
- Location within Iran
- Coordinates: 31°58′02″N 50°02′41″E
- Country: Iran
- Province: Khuzestan
- County: Izeh
- Bakhsh: Susan
- Rural District: Susan-e Sharqi

Population (2006)
  - Total: 20
- Time zone: UTC+3:30 (IRST)
  - Summer (DST): UTC+4:30 (IRDT)

Larm (Persian: لارم, also Romanized as Lārm) is a village in Susan-e Sharqi Rural District, Susan District, Izeh County, Khuzestan Province, Iran. At the 2006 census, its population was 20, in 5 families.
