= Mombin, Iran =

Village in Khuzestan province, Iran

Mombin Persian: ممبين
- Village
- Location within Iran
- Coordinates: 32°00′43″N 50°02′08″E
- Country: Iran
- Province: Khuzestan
- County: Izeh
- District: Susan
- Rural District: Susan-e Sharqi

Population (2016)
  - Total: 748
- Time zone: UTC+3:30 (IRST)

Mombin (Persian: ممبين) (Note: Also romanized as Mom Bayn, Mombeyn, and Mombīn; also known as Mon Bayn) is a village in Susan-e Sharqi Rural District of Susan District, Izeh County, Khuzestan province, Iran.

== Demographics ==
=== Population ===
At the time of the 2006 National Census, the village's population was 854 in 141 households, when it was in the Central District. The following census in 2011 counted 786 people in 150 households, by which time the rural district had been separated from the district in the formation of Susan District. The 2016 census measured the population of the village as 748 people in 140 households. It was the most populous village in its rural district.
