= Davudak =

Village in Lorestan province, Iran

Davudak Persian: داودك
- Village
- Location within Iran
- Country: Iran
- Province: Lorestan
- County: Aligudarz
- District: Zalaqi
- Rural District: Zalaqi-ye Gharbi

Population (2016)
  - Total: Below reporting threshold
- Time zone: UTC+3:30 (IRST)

Davudak (Persian: داودك) (Note: Also romanized as Dāvūdak; also known as Dābdak, Dābedak, and Dāndak) is a village in Zalaqi-ye Gharbi Rural District of Zalaqi District (Note: Formerly Besharat District) in Aligudarz County, Lorestan province, Iran.

== Demographics ==
=== Population ===
At the time of the 2006 National Census, the village's population was 37 in 10 households. The following census in 2011 counted 67 people in 11 households. The 2016 census measured the population of the village as below the reporting threshold.
