= Bisheh, Lorestan =

Village in Lorestan province, Iran

Bisheh Persian: بيشه
- Village
- Country: Iran
- Province: Lorestan
- County: Aligudarz
- District: Zalaqi
- Rural District: Zalaqi-ye Sharqi

Population (2016)
  - Total: 36
- Time zone: UTC+3:30 (IRST)

Bisheh (Persian: بيشه) (Note: Also romanized as Bīsheh) is a village in Zalaqi-ye Sharqi Rural District of Zalaqi District (Note: Formerly Besharat District) in Aligudarz County, Lorestan province, Iran.

== Demographics ==
=== Population ===
At the time of the 2006 National Census, the village's population was 31 in six households. The following census in 2011 counted 28 people in eight households. The 2016 census measured the population of the village as 36 people in 10 households.
