= Darreh Chin =

Village in Lorestan province, Iran

Darreh Chin Persian: دره چين
- Village
- Location within Iran
- Coordinates: 32°53′43″N 49°26′48″E
- Country: Iran
- Province: Lorestan
- County: Aligudarz
- District: Zalaqi
- Rural District: Zalaqi-ye Gharbi

Population (2016)
  - Total: 171
- Time zone: UTC+3:30 (IRST)

Darreh Chin (Persian: دره چين) (Note: Also romanized as Darreh Chīn; also known as Darreh Chi) is a village in Zalaqi-ye Gharbi Rural District of Zalaqi District (Note: Formerly Besharat District) in Aligudarz County, Lorestan province, Iran.

== Demographics ==
=== Population ===
At the time of the 2006 National Census, the village's population was 217 in 32 households. The following census in 2011 counted 219 people in 39 households. The 2016 census measured the population of the village as 171 people in 32 households.
