= Pez-e Bala =

Village in Lorestan province, Iran

Pez-e Bala Persian: پز بالا
- Village
- Location within Iran
- Coordinates: 32°46′19″N 49°32′00″E
- Country: Iran
- Province: Lorestan
- County: Aligudarz
- District: Zalaqi
- Rural District: Zalaqi-ye Gharbi

Population (2016)
  - Total: 284
- Time zone: UTC+3:30 (IRST)

Pez-e Bala (Persian: پز بالا) (Note: Also romanized as Pez-e Bālā; formerly known as Pez-e Olya (پزعليا), also romanized as Pez-e ʿOlyā) is a village in Zalaqi-ye Gharbi Rural District of Zalaqi District (Note: Formerly Besharat District) in Aligudarz County, Lorestan province, Iran.

== Demographics ==
=== Population ===
At the time of the 2006 National Census, the village's population, as Pez-e Olya, was 235 in 33 households. The following census in 2011 counted 203 people in 33 households, by which time the village was listed as Pez-e Bala. The 2016 census measured the population of the village as 284 people in 65 households.
