= Shahr-e Khas =

Village in Bushehr province, Iran

Shahr-e Khas Persian: شهرخاص
- Village
- Location within Iran
- Coordinates: 27°57′03″N 52°10′54″E
- Country: Iran
- Province: Bushehr
- County: Jam
- District: Central
- Rural District: Kuri

Population (2016)
  - Total: 895
- Time zone: UTC+3:30 (IRST)

Shahr-e Khas (Persian: شهرخاص) (Note: Also romanized as Shahr Khas and Shahr-e Khāş; also known as Pālāīshgāh-ye Valī ʿAṣr) is a village in Kuri Rural District of the Central District in Jam County, Bushehr province, Iran.

== Demographics ==
=== Population ===
At the time of the 2006 National Census, the village's population was 562 in 123 households. The following census in 2011 counted 644 people in 172 households. The 2016 census measured the population of the village as 895 people in 182 households.
