= Kuri Hayati =

Village in Bushehr province, Iran

Kuri Hayati Persian: كوري حياتي
- Village
- Location within Iran
- Coordinates: 27°54′40″N 52°13′17″E
- Country: Iran
- Province: Bushehr
- County: Jam
- District: Central
- Rural District: Kuri

Population (2016)
  - Total: 1,136
- Time zone: UTC+3:30 (IRST)

Kuri Hayati (Persian: كوري حياتي) (Note: Also romanized as Kūrī Ḩayātī and Kūrīḩayātī) is a village in, and the capital of, Kuri Rural District in the Central District of Jam County, Bushehr province, Iran.

== Demographics ==
=== Population ===
At the time of the 2006 National Census, the village's population was 765 in 164 households. The following census in 2011 counted 860 people in 230 households. The 2016 census measured the population of the village as 1,136 people in 331 households. It was the most populous village in its rural district.
