= Dar Kul, Aligudarz =

Village in Lorestan province, Iran

Dar Kul Persian: دركول
- Village
- Location within Iran
- Coordinates: 33°01′54″N 49°35′46″E
- Country: Iran
- Province: Lorestan
- County: Aligudarz
- District: Zalaqi
- Rural District: Pishkuh-e Zalaqi

Population (2016)
  - Total: 53
- Time zone: UTC+3:30 (IRST)

Dar Kul (Persian: دركول) (Note: Also romanized as Dar Kūl; also known as Darreh Kūl) is a village in Pishkuh-e Zalaqi Rural District of Zalaqi District (Note: Formerly Besharat District) in Aligudarz County, Lorestan province, Iran.

== Demographics ==
=== Population ===
At the time of the 2006 National Census, the village's population was 67 in 14 households. The following census in 2011 counted 68 people in 14 households. The 2016 census measured the population of the village as 53 people in 17 households.
