= Sar Qaleh Sofla =

Village in Lorestan province, Iran

Sar Qaleh Sofla Persian: سرقلعه سفلي
- Village
- Location within Iran
- Country: Iran
- Province: Lorestan
- County: Aligudarz
- District: Zalaqi
- Rural District: Zalaqi-ye Sharqi

Population (2016)
  - Total: 111
- Time zone: UTC+3:30 (IRST)

Sar Qaleh Sofla (Persian: سرقلعه سفلي) (Note: Also romanized as Sar Qal‘eh Soflá) is a village in Zalaqi-ye Sharqi Rural District of Zalaqi District (Note: Formerly Besharat District) in Aligudarz County, Lorestan province, Iran.

== Demographics ==
=== Population ===
At the time of the 2006 National Census, the village's population was 103 in 18 households. The following census in 2011 counted 100 people in 22 households. The 2016 census measured the population of the village as 111 people in 25 households.
