= Horrabad-e Bala =

Village in Lorestan province, Iran

Horrabad-e Bala Persian: حرآبادبالا
- Village
- Location within Iran
- Coordinates: 33°02′23″N 49°37′19″E
- Country: Iran
- Province: Lorestan
- County: Aligudarz
- District: Zalaqi
- Rural District: Pishkuh-e Zalaqi

Population (2016)
  - Total: 220
- Time zone: UTC+3:30 (IRST)

Horrabad-e Bala (Persian: حرآبادبالا) (Note: Also romanized as Ḩorrābād-e Bālā; formerly known as Horrabad-e Olya (حرابادعليا), also romanized as Ḩorrābād-e ‘Olyā) is a village in Pishkuh-e Zalaqi Rural District of Zalaqi District (Note: Formerly Besharat District) in Aligudarz County, Lorestan province, Iran.

== Demographics ==
=== Population ===
At the time of the 2006 National Census, the village's population, as Horrabad-e Olya, was 223 in 36 households. The following census in 2011 counted 196 people in 34 households, by which time the village was listed as Horrabad-e Bala. The 2016 census measured the population of the village as 220 people in 54 households.
