= Juzir, Lorestan =

Village in Lorestan province, Iran

Juzir Persian: جوزير
- Village
- Location within Iran
- Coordinates: 33°04′44″N 49°36′00″E
- Country: Iran
- Province: Lorestan
- County: Aligudarz
- District: Zalaqi
- Rural District: Pishkuh-e Zalaqi

Population (2016)
  - Total: 335
- Time zone: UTC+3:30 (IRST)

Juzir (Persian: جوزير) (Note: Also romanized as Jūzīr) is a village in Pishkuh-e Zalaqi Rural District of Zalaqi District (Note: Formerly Besharat District) in Aligudarz County, Lorestan province, Iran.

== Demographics ==
=== Population ===
At the time of the 2006 National Census, the village's population was 313 in 55 households. The following census in 2011 counted 289 people in 55 households. The 2016 census measured the population of the village as 335 people in 91 households.
