= Horrabad-e Pain =

Village in Lorestan province, Iran

Horrabad-e Pain Persian: حرآبادپايين
- Village
- Location within Iran
- Coordinates: 33°02′07″N 49°37′47″E
- Country: Iran
- Province: Lorestan
- County: Aligudarz
- District: Zalaqi
- Rural District: Pishkuh-e Zalaqi

Population (2016)
  - Total: 148
- Time zone: UTC+3:30 (IRST)

Horrabad-e Pain (Persian: حرآبادپايين) (Note: Also romanized as Ḩorrābād-e Pā’īn; formerly known as Horrabad-e Sofla (حرابادسفلي), also romanized as Ḩorrābād-e Soflá) is a village in Pishkuh-e Zalaqi Rural District of Zalaqi District (Note: Formerly Besharat District) in Aligudarz County, Lorestan province, Iran.

== Demographics ==
=== Population ===
At the time of the 2006 National Census, the village's population, as Horrabad-e Sofla, was 184 in 37 households. The following census in 2011 counted 178 people in 39 households, by which time the village was listed as Horrabad-e Pain. The 2016 census measured the population of the village as 148 people in 37 households.
