= Barikan, Bushehr =

Village in Bushehr province, Iran

Barikan Persian: باريكان
- Village
- Location within Iran
- Coordinates: 27°53′31″N 52°14′42″E
- Country: Iran
- Province: Bushehr
- County: Jam
- District: Central
- Rural District: Kuri

Population (2016)
  - Total: 589
- Time zone: UTC+3:30 (IRST)

Barikan (Persian: باريكان) (Note: Also romanized as Bārīkān) is a village in Kuri Rural District of the Central District in Jam County, Bushehr province, Iran.

== Demographics ==
=== Population ===
At the time of the 2006 National Census, the village's population was 373 in 77 households. The following census in 2011 counted 443 people in 110 households. The 2016 census measured the population of the village as 589 people in 162 households.
