= Pez-e Pain =

Village in Lorestan province, Iran

Pez-e Pain Persian: پزپايين
- Village
- Location within Iran
- Country: Iran
- Province: Lorestan
- County: Aligudarz
- District: Zalaqi
- Rural District: Zalaqi-ye Gharbi

Population (2016)
  - Total: 160
- Time zone: UTC+3:30 (IRST)

Pez-e Pain (Persian: پزپايين) (Note: Also romanized as Pez-e Pā’īn; formerly known as Pez-e Sofla (پزسفلي), also romanized as Pez-e Soflá) is a village in Zalaqi-ye Gharbi Rural District of Zalaqi District (Note: Formerly Besharat District) in Aligudarz County, Lorestan province, Iran.

== Demographics ==
=== Population ===
At the time of the 2006 National Census, the village's population, as Pez-e Sofla, was 135 in 26 households. The following census in 2011 counted 146 people in 25 households, by which time the village was listed as Pez-e Pain. The 2016 census measured the population of the village as 160 people in 43 households.
