= Pez-e Vosta =

Village in Lorestan province, Iran

Pez-e Vosta Persian: پزوسطي
- Village
- Location within Iran
- Coordinates: 32°45′54″N 49°31′31″E
- Country: Iran
- Province: Lorestan
- County: Aligudarz
- District: Zalaqi
- Rural District: Zalaqi-ye Gharbi

Population (2016)
  - Total: 221
- Time zone: UTC+3:30 (IRST)

Pez-e Vosta (Persian: پزوسطي) (Note: Also romanized as Pez-e Vosṭā) is a village in Zalaqi-ye Gharbi Rural District of Zalaqi District (Note: Formerly Besharat District) in Aligudarz County, Lorestan province, Iran.

== Demographics ==
=== Population ===
At the time of the 2006 National Census, the village's population was 99 in 17 households. The following census in 2011 counted 96 people in 20 households. The 2016 census measured the population of the village as 221 people in 44 households.
