= Jirgah =

Village in Lorestan province, Iran

Jirgah Persian: جيرگاه
- Village
- Country: Iran
- Province: Lorestan
- County: Aligudarz
- District: Zalaqi
- Rural District: Zalaqi-ye Sharqi

Population (2016)
  - Total: 75
- Time zone: UTC+3:30 (IRST)

Jirgah (Persian: جيرگاه) (Note: Also romanized as Jīrgāh) is a village in Zalaqi-ye Sharqi Rural District of Zalaqi District (Note: Formerly Besharat District) in Aligudarz County, Lorestan province, Iran.

== Demographics ==
=== Population ===
At the time of the 2006 National Census, the village's population was 28 in four households. The following census in 2011 counted 70 people in 13 households. The 2016 census measured the population of the village as 75 people in 15 households.
