= Sar Qaleh, Ardal =

Sar Qaleh سرقلعه
- Village
- Location within Iran
- Coordinates: 31°42′01″N 50°36′09″E
- Country: Iran
- Province: Chaharmahal and Bakhtiari
- County: Ardal
- Bakhsh: Miankuh
- Rural District: Miankuh

Population (2006)
  - Total: 24
- Time zone: UTC+3:30 (IRST)
  - Summer (DST): UTC+4:30 (IRDT)

Sar Qaleh (Persian: سرقلعه, also romanized as Sar Qal‘eh) is a village in Miankuh Rural District, Miankuh District, Ardal County, Chaharmahal and Bakhtiari Province, Iran. At the 2006 census, its population was 24, in 5 families. The village is populated by Lurs.
