= Mian Bisheh =

Mian Bisheh ميان بيشه
- Village
- Location within Iran
- Coordinates: 31°22′14″N 50°01′40″E
- Country: Iran
- Province: Khuzestan
- County: Bagh-e Malek
- Bakhsh: Seydun
- Rural District: Seydun-e Shomali

Population (2006)
  - Total: 269
- Time zone: UTC+3:30 (IRST)
  - Summer (DST): UTC+4:30 (IRDT)

Mian Bisheh (Persian: ميان بيشه, also Romanized as Mīān Bīsheh; also known as Men Bīsheh) is a village in Seydun-e Shomali Rural District, Seydun District, Bagh-e Malek County, Khuzestan Province, Iran. At the 2006 census, its population was 269, in 45 families.
