= Pishkuh-e Zalaqi Rural District =

Rural district in Lorestan province, Iran

Pishkuh-e Zalaqi Rural District Persian: دهستان پيشكوه ذلقي
- Rural District
- Location within Iran
- Coordinates: 33°02′N 49°35′E
- Country: Iran
- Province: Lorestan
- County: Aligudarz
- District: Zalaqi
- Established: 1987
- Capital: Kizan Darreh

Population (2016)
  - Total: 2,676
- Time zone: UTC+3:30 (IRST)

Pishkuh-e Zalaqi Rural District (Persian: دهستان پيشكوه ذلقي) is in Zalaqi District (Note: Formerly Besharat District) of Aligudarz County, Lorestan province, Iran. Its capital is the village of Kizan Darreh.

== Demographics ==
=== Population ===
At the time of the 2006 National Census, the rural district's population was 3,388 in 597 households. There were 2,851 inhabitants in 609 households at the following census of 2011. The 2016 census measured the population of the rural district as 2,676 in 716 households. The most populous of its 44 villages was Khakbetiyeh, with 404 people.

=== Other villages in the rural district ===
- Abbas Barfi
- Abgarmak-e Olya
- Abgarmak-e Sofla
- Bagh-e Latifan
- Bisheh Khazan
- Chal Qaleh
- Cheqa Vaqfi
- Dar Kul
- Darreh Mahi Olya
- Darreh Mahi Sofla
- Deh-e Borzu
- Deh-e Seyyed
- Dehgah
- Eslamabad
- Galeh Bardar
- Gilan
- Hasanabad Dermeni
- Hendileh
- Horrabad-e Bala
- Horrabad-e Pain
- Juzir
- Kagelestan
- Kagelestan-e Bar Aftab
- Kherseyun
- Malek Alus
- Mesgari
- Nokhvodkar Dermeni
- Qolian
- Sokaneh
