= Ab Garmak-e Olya =

Ab Garmak-e Olya ابگرمك عليا
- Village
- Location within Iran
- Coordinates: 32°03′41″N 48°46′19″E
- Country: Iran
- Province: Khuzestan
- County: Shushtar
- Bakhsh: Central
- Rural District: Sardarabad

Population (2006)
  - Total: 920
- Time zone: UTC+3:30 (IRST)
  - Summer (DST): UTC+4:30 (IRDT)

Ab Garmak-e Olya (Persian: ابگرمك عليا, also romanized as Āb Garmak-e ‘Olyā; also known as Āb Garmak-e Bālā) is a village in Sardarabad Rural District, in the Central District of Shushtar County, Khuzestan Province, Iran. At the 2006 census, its population was 920, in 180 families.
