= Sar Qaleh, Lordegan =

Sar Qaleh سرقلعه
- Village
- Location within Iran
- Coordinates: 31°25′00″N 50°39′56″E
- Country: Iran
- Province: Chaharmahal and Bakhtiari
- County: Lordegan
- Bakhsh: Central
- Rural District: Milas

Population (2006)
  - Total: 561
- Time zone: UTC+3:30 (IRST)
  - Summer (DST): UTC+4:30 (IRDT)

Sar Qaleh (Persian: سرقلعه, also Romanized as Sar Qal‘eh; also known as Sar Qal‘eh-ye Mīlās) is a village in Milas Rural District, in the Central District of Lordegan County, Chaharmahal and Bakhtiari Province, Iran. At the 2006 census, its population was 561, in 110 families.
