= Bisheh Dulang =

Bisheh Dulang بيشه دولنگ
- Village
- Country: Iran
- Province: Khuzestan
- County: Dezful
- Bakhsh: Sardasht
- Rural District: Shahi

Population (2006)
  - Total: 88
- Time zone: UTC+3:30 (IRST)
  - Summer (DST): UTC+4:30 (IRDT)

Bisheh Dulang (Persian: بيشه دولنگ, also Romanized as Bīsheh Dūlang) is a village in Shahi Rural District, Sardasht District, Dezful County, Khuzestan Province, Iran. At the 2006 census, its population was 88, in 13 families.
