= Dar Kul, Khorramabad =

Dar Kul دركول
- Village
- Location within Iran
- Coordinates: 33°02′13″N 48°41′47″E
- Country: Iran
- Province: Lorestan
- County: Khorramabad
- Bakhsh: Papi
- Rural District: Tang-e Haft

Population (2006)
  - Total: 25
- Time zone: UTC+3:30 (IRST)
  - Summer (DST): UTC+4:30 (IRDT)

Dar Kul (Persian: دركول, also Romanized as Dar Kūl; also known as Darreh Kūl Rāt) is a village in Tang-e Haft Rural District, Papi District, Khorramabad County, Lorestan Province, Iran. At the 2006 census, its population was 25, in 4 families.
