= Bishehi =

Bishehi بيشه اي
- Village
- Location within Iran
- Coordinates: 30°59′41″N 50°19′51″E
- Country: Iran
- Province: Kohgiluyeh and Boyer-Ahmad
- County: Landeh
- Bakhsh: Central
- Rural District: Olya Tayeb

Population (2006)
  - Total: 111
- Time zone: UTC+3:30 (IRST)
  - Summer (DST): UTC+4:30 (IRDT)

Bishehi (Persian: بيشه اي, also Romanized as Bīsheh’ī; also known as Bīsheh) is a village in Olya Tayeb Rural District, in the Central District of Landeh County, Kohgiluyeh and Boyer-Ahmad Province, Iran. At the 2006 census, its population was 111, in 20 families.
