= Horrabad, Markazi =

Horrabad حراباد
- Village
- Location within Iran
- Coordinates: 34°20′42″N 49°41′53″E
- Country: Iran
- Province: Markazi
- County: Arak
- Bakhsh: Central
- Rural District: Mashhad-e Miqan

Population (2006)
  - Total: 273
- Time zone: UTC+3:30 (IRST)
  - Summer (DST): UTC+4:30 (IRDT)

Horrabad (Persian: حراباد, also Romanized as Ḩorrābād and Ḩorābād; also known as Hurābād) is a village in Mashhad-e Miqan Rural District, in the Central District of Arak County, Markazi Province, Iran. At the 2006 census, its population was 273, in 91 families.
