= Abgarmak-e Sofla, Zalaqi =

Village in Lorestan province, Iran

Abgarmak-e Sofla Persian: اب گرمك سفلي
- Village
- Location within Iran
- Coordinates: 33°06′07″N 49°41′49″E
- Country: Iran
- Province: Lorestan
- County: Aligudarz
- District: Zalaqi
- Rural District: Pishkuh-e Zalaqi

Population (2016)
  - Total: 15
- Time zone: UTC+3:30 (IRST)

Abgarmak-e Sofla (Persian: اب گرمك سفلي) (Note: Also romanized as Ābgarmak-e Soflā; also known as Āb Garmak, Āb Garmeh-ye Neşār, and Ābgarmak-e Pā’īn (آبگرمک پائین)) is a village in Pishkuh-e Zalaqi Rural District of Zalaqi District (Note: Formerly Besharat District) in Aligudarz County, Lorestan province, Iran.

== Demographics ==
=== Population ===
At the time of the 2006 National Census, the village's population, as Abgarmak-e Sofla, was 35 in six households. The following census in 2011 counted 25 people in six households, by which time the village was listed as Abgarmak. The 2016 census measured the population of the village as 15 people in five households.
