= Sar Qaleh-ye Ha =

Sar Qaleh-ye Ha سرقلعه ها
- Village
- Country: Iran
- Province: Khuzestan
- County: Gotvand
- Bakhsh: Central
- Rural District: Kiyaras

Population (2006)
  - Total: 94
- Time zone: UTC+3:30 (IRST)
  - Summer (DST): UTC+4:30 (IRDT)

Sar Qaleh-ye Ha (Persian: سرقلعه ها, also Romanized as Sar Qal‘eh-ye Hā) is a village in Kiyaras Rural District, in the Central District of Gotvand County, Khuzestan Province, Iran. At the 2006 census, its population was 94, in 16 families.
