= Zalaqi-ye Gharbi Rural District =

Rural district in Lorestan province, Iran

Zalaqi-ye Gharbi Rural District Persian: دهستان ذلقي غربي
- Rural District
- Location within Iran
- Coordinates: 32°53′N 49°20′E
- Country: Iran
- Province: Lorestan
- County: Aligudarz
- District: Zalaqi
- Established: 1987
- Capital: Parchel

Population (2016)
  - Total: 2,807
- Time zone: UTC+3:30 (IRST)

Zalaqi-ye Gharbi Rural District (Persian: دهستان ذلقي غربي) is in Zalaqi District (Note: Formerly Besharat District) of Aligudarz County, Lorestan province, Iran. Its capital is the village of Parchel.

== Demographics ==
=== Population ===
At the time of the 2006 National Census, the rural district's population was 3,252 in 524 households. There were 3,013 inhabitants in 574 households at the following census of 2011. The 2016 census measured the population of the rural district as 2,807 in 624 households. The most populous of its 53 villages was Parchel, with 319 people.

=== Other villages in the rural district ===
- Ab Gazag
- Ab Kaseh
- Abbasi
- Ahmad Hasan
- Alun Abbasi
- Chal Tella
- Chalshir
- Chelan
- Chiti
- Dam Dam
- Darreh Chin
- Davudak
- Emamzadeh Mohammad Hasan
- Fila
- Galleh Gah
- Galleh Kur
- Ilard
- Kal Gah
- Liruk
- Ni Badar
- Pez-e Bala
- Pez-e Pain
- Pez-e Vosta
- Polchi
- Radez
- Rezayi
- Rezgah
- Sarastaneh
- Seyyedhasan
- Suyi
- Suzar
- Tang Taf
