= Abgarmak-e Olya, Zalaqi =

Village in Lorestan province, Iran

Abgarmak-e Olya Persian: اب گرمك عليا
- Village
- Location within Iran
- Coordinates: 33°05′54″N 49°41′52″E
- Country: Iran
- Province: Lorestan
- County: Aligudarz
- District: Zalaqi
- Rural District: Pishkuh-e Zalaqi

Population (2016)
  - Total: 10
- Time zone: UTC+3:30 (IRST)

Abgarmak-e Olya (Persian: اب گرمك عليا) (Note: Also romanized as Ābgarmak-e Olyā; also known as Āb Garmeh-ye Bar Āftāb and Ābgarmak-e Bālā (آبگرمک بالا)) is a village in Pishkuh-e Zalaqi Rural District of Zalaqi District (Note: Formerly Besharat District) in Aligudarz County, Lorestan province, Iran.

== Demographics ==
=== Population ===
At the time of the 2006 National Census, the village's population, as Abgarmak-e Olya, was 26 in six households. The following census in 2011 counted 33 people in nine households, by which time the village was listed as Abgarmak-e Bala. The 2016 census measured the population of the village as 10 people in four households.
