= Sar Qaleh, Kurdistan =

Sar Qaleh سرقلعه
- Village
- Location within Iran
- Coordinates: 35°55′51″N 47°07′14″E
- Country: Iran
- Province: Kurdistan
- County: Divandarreh
- Bakhsh: Central
- Rural District: Howmeh

Population (2006)
  - Total: 510
- Time zone: UTC+3:30 (IRST)
  - Summer (DST): UTC+4:30 (IRDT)

Sar Qaleh (Persian: سرقلعه, also Romanized as Sar Qal‘eh; also known as Sarkhāla) is a village in Howmeh Rural District, in the Central District of Divandarreh County, Kurdistan Province, Iran. At the 2006 census, its population was 510, in 101 families. The village is populated by Kurds.
