= Darreh Lir, Khuzestan =

Darreh Lir دره لير
- Village
- Location within Iran
- Coordinates: 30°36′23″N 50°24′25″E
- Country: Iran
- Province: Khuzestan
- County: Behbahan
- Bakhsh: Central
- Rural District: Howmeh

Population (2006)
  - Total: 84
- Time zone: UTC+3:30 (IRST)
  - Summer (DST): UTC+4:30 (IRDT)

Darreh Lir (Persian: دره لير, also Romanized as Darreh Līr) is a village in Howmeh Rural District, in the Central District of Behbahan County, Khuzestan Province, Iran. At the 2006 census, its population was 84, in 17 families.
