= Sar Qaleh-ye Khalijan =

Coordinates: 31.7749°N 49.8083°E

Sar Qaleh-ye Khalijan سرقلعه هلايجان
- Village
- Interactive map of Sar Qaleh-ye Khalijan
- Country: Iran
- Province: Khuzestan
- County: Izeh
- Bakhsh: Central
- Rural District: Holayjan

Population (2006)
  - Total: 416
- Time zone: UTC+3:30 (IRST)
  - Summer (DST): UTC+4:30 (IRDT)

Sar Qaleh-ye Khalijan (Persian: سرقلعه هلايجان, also Romanized as Sar Qal‘eh-ye Khalījān) is a village in Holayjan Rural District, in the Central District of Izeh County, Khuzestan Province, Iran. At the 2006 census, its population was 416, in 74 families.
