= Darreh Kal =

Darreh Kal دره كل
- Village
- Location within Iran
- Coordinates: 31°01′34″N 50°35′17″E
- Country: Iran
- Province: Kohgiluyeh and Boyer-Ahmad
- County: Kohgiluyeh
- Bakhsh: Central
- Rural District: Doshman Ziari

Population (2006)
  - Total: 241
- Time zone: UTC+3:30 (IRST)
  - Summer (DST): UTC+4:30 (IRDT)

Darreh Kal (Persian: دره كل; also known as Darreh Che, Darreh Chel, and Darreh Chī) is a village in Doshman Ziari Rural District, in the Central District of Kohgiluyeh County, Kohgiluyeh and Boyer-Ahmad Province, Iran. At the 2006 census, its population was 241, in 41 families.
