= Bisheh Bozan =

Bisheh Bozan بيشه بزان
- Village
- Location within Iran
- Coordinates: 32°35′51″N 48°32′55″E
- Country: Iran
- Province: Khuzestan
- County: Dezful
- Bakhsh: Sardasht
- Rural District: Shahi

Population (2006)
  - Total: 348
- Time zone: UTC+3:30 (IRST)
  - Summer (DST): UTC+4:30 (IRDT)

Bisheh Bozan (Persian: بيشه بزان, also Romanized as Bīsheh Bozān) is a village in Shahi Rural District, Sardasht District, Dezful County, Khuzestan Province, Iran. At the 2006 census, its population was 348, in 67 families.
