= Abgarmak, Bushehr =

Village in Bushehr province, Iran

Abgarmak Persian: ابگرمك
- Village
- Location within Iran
- Coordinates: 27°54′05″N 52°13′39″E
- Country: Iran
- Province: Bushehr
- County: Jam
- District: Central
- Rural District: Kuri

Population (2016)
  - Total: 975
- Time zone: UTC+3:30 (IRST)

Abgarmak (Persian: ابگرمك) (Note: Also romanized as Āb Garmak and Ābgarmak) is a village in Kuri Rural District of the Central District in Jam County, Bushehr province, Iran. In 2018, the mayor of Jam, Iran, announced a zero waste program in the village.

== Demographics ==
=== Population ===
At the time of the 2006 National Census, the village's population was 722 in 149 households. The following census in 2011 counted 864 people in 220 households. The 2016 census measured the population of the village as 975 people in 272 households.
