= Kuri Rural District =

Rural district in Bushehr province, Iran

Kuri Rural District Persian: دهستان كورئ
- Rural District
- Location within Iran
- Coordinates: 27°55′N 52°16′E
- Country: Iran
- Province: Bushehr
- County: Jam
- District: Central
- Established: 2003
- Capital: Kuri Hayati

Population (2016)
  - Total: 4,512
- Time zone: UTC+3:30 (IRST)

Kuri Rural District (Persian: دهستان كورئ) is in the Central District of Jam County, Bushehr province, Iran. Its capital is the village of Kuri Hayati.

== Demographics ==
=== Population ===
At the time of the 2006 National Census, the rural district's population was 3,309 in 711 households. There were 3,689 inhabitants in 951 households at the following census of 2011. The 2016 census measured the population of the rural district as 4,512 in 1,203 households. The most populous of its 16 villages was Kuri Hayati, with 1,136 people.

=== Other villages in the rural district ===
- Abgarmak
- Barikan
- Shahr-e Khas
