= Bisheh, Yazd =

Bisheh بيشه
- Village
- Location within Iran
- Coordinates: 31°31′52″N 53°49′40″E
- Country: Iran
- Province: Yazd
- County: Taft
- Bakhsh: Central
- Rural District: Dehshir

Population (2006)
  - Total: 39
- Time zone: UTC+3:30 (IRST)
  - Summer (DST): UTC+4:30 (IRDT)

Bisheh (Persian: بيشه, also Romanized as Bīsheh) is a village in Dehshir Rural District, in the Central District of Taft County, Yazd Province, Iran. At the 2006 census, its population was 39, in 15 families.
