= Sar Qaleh, Manj =

Village in Chaharmahal and Bakhtiari, Iran

Sar Qaleh سرقلعه
- Village
- Location within Iran
- Coordinates: 31°32′39″N 50°41′32″E
- Country: Iran
- Province: Chaharmahal and Bakhtiari
- County: Lordegan
- Bakhsh: Manj
- Rural District: Manj

Population (2006)
  - Total: 41
- Time zone: UTC+3:30 (IRST)
  - Summer (DST): UTC+4:30 (IRDT)

Sar Qaleh (Persian: سرقلعه, also Romanized as Sar Qal‘eh; also known as Sar Qal‘eh-ye Soflá) is a village in Manj Rural District, Manj District, Lordegan County, Chaharmahal and Bakhtiari Province, Iran. At the 2006 census, its population was 41, in 7 families. The village is populated by Lurs.
