= Biseh =

Biseh بيسه
- Village
- Location within Iran
- Coordinates: 27°24′09″N 54°19′24″E
- Country: Iran
- Province: Hormozgan
- County: Bastak
- Bakhsh: Central
- Rural District: Fatuyeh

Population (2006)
  - Total: 204
- Time zone: UTC+3:30 (IRST)
  - Summer (DST): UTC+4:30 (IRDT)

Biseh (Persian: بيسه, also Romanized as Bīseh; also known as Bīsheh, Nasyeh, and Pīseh) is a village in Fatuyeh Rural District, in the Central District of Bastak County, Hormozgan Province, Iran. At the 2006 census, its population was 204, in 40 families.
