= Ab Garmag, Aligudarz =

Ab Garmag اب گرمگ
- Village
- Location within Iran
- Coordinates: 33°02′20″N 49°12′49″E
- Country: Iran
- Province: Lorestan
- County: Aligudarz
- Bakhsh: Zaz and Mahru
- Rural District: Zaz-e Sharqi

Population (2006)
  - Total: 46
- Time zone: UTC+3:30 (IRST)
  - Summer (DST): UTC+4:30 (IRDT)

Ab Garmag (Persian: اب گرمگ, also Romanized as Āb Garmag; also known as Āb Garmak) is a village in Zaz-e Sharqi Rural District, Zaz and Mahru District, Aligudarz County, Lorestan Province, Iran. At the 2006 census, its population was 46, in 8 families.
