= Bisheh-e Sorkh =

Bisheh-e Sorkh بیشه‌سرخ
- Village
- Country: Iran
- Province: Khuzestan
- County: Dezful
- Bakhsh: Sardasht
- Rural District: Sardasht

Population (2006)
  - Total: 46
- Time zone: UTC+3:30 (IRST)
  - Summer (DST): UTC+4:30 (IRDT)

Bisheh-e Sorkh (Persian: بیشه‌سرخ, also Romanized as Bīsheh-e Sorkh) is a village in Sardasht Rural District, Sardasht District, Dezful County, Khuzestan Province, Iran. At the 2006 census, its population was 46, in 8 families.
