= Darreh Cheh =

Darreh Cheh دره چه
- Village
- Location within Iran
- Coordinates: 33°14′04″N 49°03′07″E
- Country: Iran
- Province: Lorestan
- County: Aligudarz
- Bakhsh: Zaz and Mahru
- Rural District: Zaz-e Sharqi

Population (2006)
  - Total: 111
- Time zone: UTC+3:30 (IRST)
  - Summer (DST): UTC+4:30 (IRDT)

Darreh Cheh (Persian: دره چه, also Romanized as Darreh Chāh) is a village in Zaz-e Sharqi Rural District, Zaz and Mahru District, Aligudarz County, Lorestan Province, Iran. At the 2006 census, its population was 111, with 16 families.
