= Abgarmak-e Olya, Zaz and Mahru =

Village in Lorestan, Iran

Abgarmak-e Olya آبگرمک عليا
- Village
- Location within Iran
- Coordinates: 33°01′56″N 48°53′04″E
- Country: Iran
- Province: Lorestan
- County: Aligudarz
- Bakhsh: Zaz and Mahru
- Rural District: Mahru

Population (2006)
  - Total: 22
- Time zone: UTC+3:30 (IRST)
  - Summer (DST): UTC+4:30 (IRDT)

Abgarmak-e Olya (Persian: آبگرمک عليا, also romanized as Ābgarmak-e ‘Olyā) is a village in Mahru Rural District, Zaz va Mahru District, Aligudarz County, Lorestan Province, Iran. At the 2006 census, its population was 22, in 5 families.
