= Ab Garmak, Bagh-e Malek =

Ab Garmak ابگرمك
- Village
- Location within Iran
- Coordinates: 31°17′58″N 49°56′44″E
- Country: Iran
- Province: Khuzestan
- County: Bagh-e Malek
- Bakhsh: Meydavud
- Rural District: Saroleh

Population (2006)
  - Total: 189
- Time zone: UTC+3:30 (IRST)
  - Summer (DST): UTC+4:30 (IRDT)

Ab Garmak (Persian: ابگرمك, also Romanized as Āb Garmak; also known as Ābgarmak-e Pā’īn) is a village in Saroleh Rural District, Meydavud District, Bagh-e Malek County, Khuzestan Province, Iran. In 2006, its population was 189, in 36 families.
