= Ab Garmak-e Sofla, Khuzestan =

Ab Garmak-e Sofla ابگرمك سفلي
- Village
- Location within Iran
- Coordinates: 32°02′24″N 48°47′02″E
- Country: Iran
- Province: Khuzestan
- County: Shushtar
- Bakhsh: Central
- Rural District: Sardarabad

Population (2006)
  - Total: 1,225
- Time zone: UTC+3:30 (IRST)
  - Summer (DST): UTC+4:30 (IRDT)

Ab Garmak-e Sofla (Persian: ابگرمك سفلي, also Romanized as Āb Garmak-e Soflá; also known as Āb Garmak and Āb Garmak-e Pā‘īn) is a village in Sardarabad Rural District, in the Central District of Shushtar County, Khuzestan Province, Iran. At the 2006 census, its population was 1,225, with 237 families.
