= Zalaqi-ye Sharqi Rural District =

Rural district in Lorestan province, Iran

Zalaqi-ye Sharqi Rural District Persian: دهستان ذلقي شرقي
- Rural District
- Location within Iran
- Coordinates: 32°52′N 49°38′E
- Country: Iran
- Province: Lorestan
- County: Aligudarz
- District: Zalaqi
- Established: 1987
- Capital: Chaleh Pareh

Population (2016)
  - Total: 2,863
- Time zone: UTC+3:30 (IRST)

Zalaqi-ye Sharqi Rural District (Persian: دهستان ذلقي شرقي) is in Zalaqi District (Note: Formerly Besharat District) of Aligudarz County, Lorestan province, Iran. Its capital is the village of Chaleh Pareh. The previous capital of the rural district was the village of Kish Olya. (Note: Also known as Kish Beznavid)

== Demographics ==
=== Population ===
At the time of the 2006 National Census, the rural district's population was 3,267 in 552 households. There were 3,839 inhabitants in 600 households at the following census of 2011. The 2016 census measured the population of the rural district as 2,863 in 648 households. The most populous of its 49 villages was Chaleh Pareh, with 424 people.

=== Other villages in the rural district ===
- Bisheh
- Chalgaz
- Charaki
- Dareshgeft
- Darreh Lir
- Darreh Tarik
- Dastgerd
- Deh Shahi
- Dehnow
- Galeh Muh
- Gerdab
- Haft Khani
- Hastak
- Irman
- Jirgah
- Kish Galeh Bid
- Malia
- Marreh
- Mobarakabad
- Mohammadabad
- Mucherella
- Pakhimeh Gah
- Pandaki
- Sar Qaleh Sofla
- Sarabad Bar Aftab
- Sharvand
- Tang-e Kureh-ye Olya
- Tang-e Kureh-ye Sofla
- Tindar
- Tut-e Rudab
- Varak
