= Susan-e Sharqi Rural District =

Rural district in Khuzestan province, Iran

Susan-e Sharqi Rural District Persian: دهستان سوسن شرقی
- Rural District
- Location within Iran
- Coordinates: 32°06′58″N 49°56′06″E
- Country: Iran
- Province: Khuzestan
- County: Izeh
- District: Susan
- Capital: Jangeh

Population (2016)
  - Total: 4,530
- Time zone: UTC+3:30 (IRST)

Susan-e Sharqi Rural District (Persian: دهستان سوسن شرقی) is in Susan District of Izeh County, Khuzestan province, Iran. Its capital is the village of Jangeh.

== Demographics ==
=== Population ===
At the time of the 2006 National Census, the rural district's population (as a part of the Central District) was 5,517 in 965 households. There were 5,075 inhabitants in 961 households at the following census of 2011, by which time the rural district had been separated from the district in the formation of Susan District. The 2016 census measured the population of the rural district as 4,530 in 819 households. The most populous of its 36 villages was Mombin, with 748 people.
