= Susan-e Gharbi Rural District =

Rural district in Khuzestan province, Iran

Susan-e Gharbi Rural District Persian: دهستان سوسن غربی
- Rural District
- Location within Iran
- Coordinates: 32°05′05″N 49°52′01″E
- Country: Iran
- Province: Khuzestan
- County: Izeh
- District: Susan
- Capital: Torshak

Population (2016)
  - Total: 8,423
- Time zone: UTC+3:30 (IRST)

Susan-e Gharbi Rural District (Persian: دهستان سوسن غربی) is in Susan District of Izeh County, Khuzestan province, Iran. Its capital is the village of Torshak.

== Demographics ==
=== Population ===
At the time of the 2006 National Census, the rural district's population (as a part of the Central District) was 11,022 in 1,906 households. There were 10,117 inhabitants in 1,958 households at the following census of 2011, by which time the rural district had been separated from the district in the formation of Susan District. The 2016 census measured the population of the rural district as 8,423 in 1,823 households. The most populous of its 87 villages was Javad-e Seyyedi, with 872 people.
