= Susan District =

District in Khuzestan province, Iran

Susan District Persian: بخش سوسن
- District
- Location within Iran
- Coordinates: 32°06′58″N 49°59′13″E
- Country: Iran
- Province: Khuzestan
- County: Izeh
- Capital: Torshak

Population (2016)
  - Total: 12,953
- Time zone: UTC+3:30 (IRST)

Susan District (Persian: بخش سوسن) is in Izeh County, Khuzestan province, Iran. Its capital is the village of Torshak.

== History ==
After the 2006 National Census, Susan-e Gharbi and Susan-e Sharqi Rural Districts were separated from the Central District in the formation of Susan District.

== Demographics ==
=== Population ===
At the time of the 2011 census, the district's population was 15,192 people in 2,919 households. The 2016 census measured the population of the district as 12,953 inhabitants in 2,642 households.

=== Administrative divisions ===
Susan District Population
Administrative Divisions	2011	2016
Susan-e Gharbi RD	10,117	8,423
Susan-e Sharqi RD	5,075	4,530
Total	15,192	12,953
RD = Rural District
