= Zalaqi District =

District in Lorestan province, Iran

Zalaqi District Persian: بخش ذلقي
- District
- Location within Iran
- Coordinates: 32°56′N 49°23′E
- Country: Iran
- Province: Lorestan
- County: Aligudarz
- Established: 1996
- Capital: Titkan

Population (2016)
  - Total: 8,346
- Time zone: UTC+3:30 (IRST)

Zalaqi District (Persian: بخش ذلقي) (Note: Formerly Besharat District (بخش بشارت)) is in Aligudarz County, Lorestan province, Iran. Its capital is the city of Titkan. The previous capital of the district was the village of Kish Olya. (Note: Also known as Kish Beznavid)

== History ==
The village of Titkan was converted to a city in 2021.

== Demographics ==
=== Population ===
At the time of the 2006 National Census, the district's population was 9,907 in 1,673 households. The following census in 2011 counted 9,703 people in 1,783 households. The 2016 census measured the population of the district as 8,346 inhabitants in 1,988 households.

=== Administrative divisions ===
Zalaqi District Population
Administrative Divisions	2006	2011	2016
Pishkuh-e Zalaqi RD	3,388	2,851	2,676
Zalaqi-ye Gharbi RD	3,252	3,013	2,807
Zalaqi-ye Sharqi RD	3,267	3,839	2,863
Titkan (city) (Note: Became a city after the 2016 census)			
Total	9,907	9,703	8,346
RD = Rural District
